= UFL Division 2 =

United Football League Division 2
- Founded: 2009
- Folded: 2015
- Country: Philippines
- Confederation: AFC
- Level on pyramid: 2
- Promotion to: UFL Division 1
- Domestic cup: UFL Cup
- League cup(s): UFL FA League Cup; UFL FA Charity Cup
- Last champions: Laos (1st title) (2015)
- Most championships: Global; Manila Nomads; Pachanga Diliman; Sigla; Ceres; Laos (1 title each)

The United Football League Division 2, often referred to as UFL Division 2 or UFL 2, was the second-tier association football league in the Philippines. During its existence, it is the second-highest division of football in the Philippines after UFL Division 1. Each year, the winner of the league gets an automatic promotion to the latter. The second placer, on the other hand, goes against the ninth placer of the first division in a two-legged playoff.

UFL Division 2 was introduced for the 2010 season. For the 2015 season, Ceres and Manila Jeepney were promoted to compete in the country's top-flight division. Due to its inability to comply with the league's foreigner cap rule, Manila Nomads volunteered to step down from UFL Division 1 before the start of the 2014 season. Thus, Manila Jeepney was also automatically promoted to the first division.

The league was scrapped after the 2015 season with the 2016 season to push through with only a single division.

== History ==
=== Inception of second-tier league ===
After the end of 2011 season, seven new clubs entered the United Football League as part of the formation of UFL Division 2. Among the clubs that participated in the inaugural run of the second division, which commenced on 14 January 2012, include Agila, Cebu Queen City United, Diliman, Forza, Laos, Pachanga, and Team Socceroo participated in the second division. Manila Nomads won the first-ever UFL Division 2 title, and the club was promoted to UFL Division 1 the following season. Two other clubs from the second division were also promoted to the first division, namely: Pasargad and Stallion.

Pachanga was crowned UFL Division 2 champion for the 2012 season. The club finished at the top of the second division, which secured the team's promotion to UFL Division 1. Freddy Gonzalez, the a striker for Pachanga, was awarded the golden boot of UFL Division 2 for the 2012 season. Thus, Pachanga replaced the relegated Navy in the first division.

=== Expansion year and restructuring ===
At the start of the 2012 season, UFL Division 2 got expanded to 12 football clubs. Most of the matches for the second division were held at the Turf@BGC, a venue with an artificial football pitch located at Fort Bonifacio, Taguig City. The league kicked off its first match between Dolphins United and Cebu Queen City United on February 9, 2013, at the Emperador Stadium. However, Cebu Queen City United did not show up in the game time.

On 1 March 2013, the UFL management has officially ruled out Cebu Queen City United from participating after the club apparently withdrawn when the club's request for home games in Cebu was turned down by the league.

A new promotion-relegation system was adopted by the league at the start of the 2013 season. The club that finishes second in UFL Division 2 also has a chance of being promoted via a two-legged aggregate-goal playoff against the ninth-place team in the first division, similar to the system used in the Bundesliga.

=== Introduction of foreigner cap rule ===
For the 2014 season, relegated Philippine Air Force was replaced by Team Socceroo, the champions of the 2013 UFL Division 2. Further, Manila Nomads voluntarily stepped down from the first division to play in UFL Division 2 due to the club's inability to comply with UFL Division 1's foreigner cap rule before this season commenced. The UFL executive committee decided to implement a version of the foreign player rule. Under such rule, a club may only field in a maximum of five foreign players on the pitch at any given time. However, two of the six remaining players on the pitch may still be foreigners provided that they are permanent residents of the Philippines for at least five years. In addition, Ceres also made their league debut during this season.

== Summary ==
The top club in UFL Division 2 each season receive an automatic promotion to the first division. Starting the 2013 season, the second placer also gets a chance of being promoted via a two-legged playoff against the ninth-place club in UFL Division 1.

| Season | Champion | Runners-up | Third place |
|---|---|---|---|
| 2010 | Global | Manila Nomads | Mama Africa |
| 2011 | Manila Nomads | Stallion | Pasargad |
| 2012 | Pachanga | Diliman | Cebu Queen City United |
| 2013 | Team Socceroo | Union Internacional Manila † | Forza |
| 2014 | Ceres-La Salle | Manila Jeepney | Philippine Air Force |
| 2015 | Laos | JP Voltes‡ | Forza |

* Bold designates promoted clubs
† Lost the promotion and relegation playoff
‡ Won the promotion and relegation playoff and got promoted

== Clubs ==
- Agila (2012–15)
- Cebu Queen City United (2012)
- Ceres (2014)
- Cimarron (2010, 2012–14)
- Dolphins United (2011–14)
- Forza (2012–15)
- Global (2010)
- Kabuscorp De Laguna (2015)
- JP Voltes (2010–15)
- Laos (2012–15)
- Mama Africa (2010)
- Manila Jeepney (2014)
- Manila Lions (2010–12)
- Manila Nomads (2010–11, 2014)
- Mendiola (2015)
- Pachanga Diliman (2012)
- Pasargad (2011, 2015)
- Philippine Air Force (2014)
- Philippine Navy (2013–14)
- Team Socceroo (2012–13)
- Stallion (2011)
- Sunken Garden United (2010–12)
- Union Internacional Manila (2011–14)
- United South (2010)

== Honors ==
=== Golden boot winners ===
| Season | Player | Club | Goals |
|---|---|---|---|
| 2011 | (United Kingdom) Steven Borrill | Manila Nomads | 15 |
| 2012 | (Philippines) Freddy Gonzalez | Pachanga | 34 |
| 2013 | (South Korea) Jeong Woo Lee | Team Socceroo | 14 |
| 2014 | (South Korea) Jin Ho Kim | Ceres | 32 |
| 2015 | (Japan) Chichiro Noda | JP Voltes | 12 |

=== Golden ball award ===
| Year | Player | Position | Club |
|---|---|---|---|
| 2011 | (United Kingdom) Steven Borrill | Midfielder | Manila Nomads |
| 2012 | (Philippines) Freddy Gonzalez | Forward | Pachanga FC |
| 2013 | (South Korea) Jeong Woo Lee | Forward | Team Socceroo |
| 2014 | None given for UFL Division 2 | | |
| 2015 | None given for UFL Division 2 | | |

=== Golden glove trophy ===
| Year | Player | Club |
|---|---|---|
| 2011 | (United States) Jeff Blake | Manila Nomads |
| 2012 | (Philippines) Kenneth Dolloso | Pachanga |
| 2013 | (South Korea) Seung Seok Seo | Team Socceroo |
| 2014 | (Philippines) Louie Michael Casas | Ceres |
| 2015 | None given for UFL Division 2 | |

== See also ==
- UFL Division 1
- PFF National Men's Club Championship
- Filipino Premier League
