= Jovin Bedic =

Filipino footballer

Personal information
- Full name: Jovin Hervas Bedic
- Date of birth: June 8, 1990 (age 36)
- Place of birth: Barotac Nuevo, Iloilo, Philippines
- Height: 1.72 m (5 ft 8 in)
- Positions: Forward; winger

College career
Years	Team	Apps	(Gls)
- West Negros University

Senior career*
Years	Team	Apps	(Gls)
2011–2013	Pachanga		
2013	Stallion		
2013–2026	Kaya–Iloilo	191	(46)

International career^{‡}
2022	Philippines U23	4	(3)
2014–2022	Philippines	11	(4)
- * Club domestic league appearances and goals as of August 16, 2026 ‡ National team caps and goals as of 02:30; September 10, 2022 (UTC)

Jovin Hervas Bedic (born June 8, 1990) is a Filipino former professional footballer who played as a forward or a winger.

== Early life ==
Bedic was born in Barotac Nuevo, Iloilo—a town nicknamed the "Football Capital of the Philippines". His father was a football instructor, while his older brother also played the sport. He began playing football in second grade.

Bedic attended West Negros University in Bacolod to study information technology and was part of the school's varsity team. However, he later dropped out.

== Club career ==
=== Pachanga ===
Bedic was invited by coach Nonoy Fegidero to join Pachanga for the 2011 United Football League (UFL) Cup. He scored a goal in each of the three group matches as Pachanga topped their group with two wins and a draw. Their campaign ended after losing to Global in the quarter-finals.

Pachanga were then admitted to the United Football League Division 2 for the 2012 season. On June 16, Bedic scored a brace in the first half of their 4–0 victory over Agila, winning the league title with one match to spare.

=== Stallion ===
Bedic played for Stallion for around two months.

=== Kaya ===
Bedic joined Kaya in 2013. During the 2018 Copa Paulino Alcantara final, Kaya and Davao Aguilas were at a scoreless draw by the end of regulation time. At the 119th minute, Bedic scored the match-winning goal to give Kaya the victory, winning the inaugural tournament.

In Kaya's first match of the 2019 AFC Cup group stage, Bedic scored the first goal in a 1–1 draw against Lao Toyota on February 27. He then scored the second goal in a 5–0 win over defending ASEAN Zonal champions Home United on March 13. His 91st-minute penalty was Kaya's only goal in a 2–1 loss to PSM Makassar on April 17. However, Kaya failed to advance from the group stage.

During Kaya's debut campaign in the AFC Champions League, Bedic scored in their 2–1 group stage loss to defending champions Ulsan Hyundai on July 5, 2021. Later that year, he won the 2021 Copa Paulino Alcantara Golden Ball by leading Kaya to their second title. He scored three goals in the tournament.

Bedic retired after the 2025–26 PFL season.

== International career ==
=== Philippines ===
Bedic made his senior debut for the Philippines coming on as substitute in a friendly goalless draw against Malaysia, played at the Cebu City Sports Center on April 27, 2014. He made his second appearance for the national team in a friendly match against Kyrgyzstan on September 6, 2016.

Bedic was named in the 21-man squad for the 2018 Bangabandhu Cup. In the Philippines' first group match of the tournament against Laos on October 3, Bedic was fouled in the penalty area; he then took the penalty kick and scored his first international goal in a 3–1 victory. The Philippines went on to top Group B undefeated, but lost to Tajikistan in the semi-finals.

Bedic was included in the Philippines' 23-man squad for the 2018 AFF Championship. In the Philippines' third group match against defending champions Thailand, he came on as a 78th-minute substitute for Stephan Palla. Within three minutes, he scored the equalizing goal to ensure a 1–1 draw. However, in the semi-finals, Philippines were defeated by eventual champions Vietnam on 4–2 aggregate.

Bedic was named in the Philippines' squad for the 2019 AFC Asian Cup—the first time the national team has qualified for the international tournament. He was not able to play in the tournament as the Philippines were eliminated after losing all their group stage games.

=== Philippines U23 ===
Bedic was named as one of the over-aged players for the Philippines under-23 team at the 31st Southeast Asian Games, which was held in Vietnam. Bedic scored his first goal for Philippines U23 in a 4–0 win against Timor-Leste

=== International goals ===
Scores and results list the Philippines' goal tally first.

#	Date	Venue	Opponent	Score	Result	Competition
1.	October 3, 2018	Sylhet District Stadium, Sylhet	Laos	1–0	3–1	2018 Bangabandhu Cup
2.	November 21, 2018	Panaad Stadium, Bacolod	Thailand	1–1	1–1	2018 AFF Championship
3.	July 16, 2022	Kapten I Wayan Dipta Stadium, Bali	Timor-Leste	3–0	4–1	Friendly
4.	July 16, 2022	Kapten I Wayan Dipta Stadium, Bali	Timor-Leste	4–1	4–1	Friendly

== Career statistics ==
=== Club ===
As of 17 March 2023

Club	Season	League			Cup		Continental		Total	
Club	Season	Division	Apps	Goals	Apps	Goals	Apps	Goals	Apps	Goals
Kaya–Iloilo	2017	PFL	23	4	–		–		23	4
Kaya–Iloilo	2018	PFL	19	9	5	1	–		24	10
Kaya–Iloilo	2019	PFL	13	4	3	0	5	3	21	7
Kaya–Iloilo	2020	PFL	5	1	–		3	1	8	2
Kaya–Iloilo	2021	PFL	–		4	3	7	1	11	4
Kaya–Iloilo	2022–23	PFL	16	3	6	0	4	0	26	3
Career total			85	21	18	4	19	5	113	30

== Honors ==
=== Club ===
Pachanga Diliman

- United Football League Division 2: 2012

Kaya–Iloilo

- Philippines Football League: 2022–23, 2024
- Copa Paulino Alcantara: 2018, 2021; runner-up: 2019
- United Football League Cup third place: 2016

=== Individual ===
- Copa Paulino Alcantara Golden Ball: 2021
- Southeast Asian Games Top scorer: 2021
