= 2011 United Football League =

United Football League (Philippines)
- Season: 2011
- Champions: Division 1: Philippine Air Force (2nd Title); Division 2: Manila Nomads (1st Title)
- Promoted: Manila Nomads; Stallion; Pasargad
- Matches played: 31
- Goals scored: 121 (3.9 per match)
- Top goalscorer: Division 1: (Sudan) Izzo Elhabbib (10 goals)
- Highest scoring: Manila Nomads 8–2 Sunken Garden United (6 February 2011)
- Longest winning run: 10 games Stallion
- Longest unbeaten run: 10 games Stallion
- Longest winless run: 5 games Manila Lions
- Longest losing run: 5 games Manila Lions

The 2011 United Football League (known as the LBC United Football League for sponsorship reasons) began with seven teams in Division 1 and eight teams in Division 2. This was the second season of the United Football League since its establishment as a semi-professional tournament in 2009.

The season started on 23 January 2011 with two matches at the University of Makati Stadium. Philippine Air Force F.C. are the current defending Champions.

The Philippine Air Force won their second title in the first division. The Manila Nomads won their first title in the second division and together with Stallion FC and Pasargad, they were promoted to the 2012 United Football League Division 1 after their good stint in the 2011 UFL Cup.

== League tables ==
=== Division 1 ===
Pos	Team	Pld	W	D	L	GF	GA	GD	Pts
1	Philippine Air Force (C)	12	8	3	1	30	7	+23	27
2	Global	12	6	6	0	28	6	+22	24
3	Philippine Army	12	5	5	2	16	17	−1	20
4	Kaya	12	5	2	5	13	17	−4	17
5	Loyola	12	4	3	5	16	24	−8	15
6	Green Archers United	12	2	3	7	12	21	−9	9
7	Philippine Navy (Note: Philippine Navy was not relegated as the league extended to 10 clubs for 2012 season)	12	0	2	10	8	32	−24	2

Updated to match(es) played on 30 June 2011. Source: rsssf.com
Rules for classification: 1) Points; 2) Goal Difference; 3) Goals Scored
(C) Champions

=== Division 2 ===
Pos	Team	Pld	W	D	L	GF	GA	GD	Pts	Qualification or relegation
1	Manila Nomads (C, P)	14	12	1	1	61	12	+49	37	Promotion to the 2012 UFL Division 1
2	Stallion (P)	14	11	0	3	42	11	+31	33	Promotion to the 2012 UFL Division 1
3	Pasargad (Note: Pasargad's one of the loss was due to forfeiture after not appearing during the match.) (P)	14	10	0	4	45	21	+24	30	Promotion to the 2012 UFL Division 1
4	Dolphins United	14	6	3	5	23	19	+4	21	
5	Union Internacional Manila	14	6	0	8	18	46	−28	18	
6	Manila Lions	14	3	1	10	12	35	−23	10	
7	Sunken Garden United	14	2	2	10	22	56	−34	8	
8	Manila All-Japan	14	2	1	11	19	42	−23	7	

Updated to match(es) played on 30 June 2011. Source: rsssf.com
Rules for classification: 1) Points; 2) Goal Difference; 3) Goals Scored
(C) Champions; (P) Promoted

== Venues ==
Stadium	Location
University of Makati Stadium	Makati
Alabang Country Club Football Field	Muntinlupa
Nomads Sporting Club	Parañaque
ASCOM Football Field	Taguig

== Personnel and Kits ==
Team	Head coach	Captain	Kit Manufacturer	Sponsor
Kaya Futbol Club	(Philippines) Rudy del Rosario	(Philippines) Aly Borromeo	Rudy Project	CignaL
Philippine Army	(Philippines) Ricky Cain	-	-	Fritz & Macziol IBM
Green Archers United	(Philippines) Jose Ramon Garcia	(Philippines) Patrick Bacobo	Comadore Sports and Leisure	Orient Freight
Philippine Navy	(Philippines) Parcon	-	-	None
Global FC	(Philippines) Dan Palami	-	-	Smartmatic
Loyola Agila	(Philippines) Rafael Evangelista	(Philippines) Pat Ozaeta		ATR-KimEng
Union F.C. Manila	(Philippines) Charlie Cojuangco	-	-	-
Philippine Air Force	(Philippines) Oscar Rabena	(Philippines) Yanti Barsales	-	Rider
Dolphins United	(Philippines) Apolonio Tito Clemente	-	-	-
Japan K-Line	(Japan) Ryo Kono	-	-	K-Line
Manila Lions	(Philippines) Frederick Dy	(Philippines) Patrick Chua	Comadore Sports and Leisure	None
Manila Nomads	-	-	-	-
Pasargad FC	(Iran) Fardin Faghihi	-	-	-
Stallion FC	(Philippines) Eduardo P. Robles	(Philippines) Ruben Doctora	Comadore Sports and Leisure	Gilligan's Grill and Bar
Sunken Garden United	(Philippines) Roland Tulay	-	-	-
Union Internacional Manila	-	-	-	-
