= List of football clubs in the Philippines =

List of association football clubs in the Philippines sorted by league and division:

== Current system ==
=== Philippines Football League (2017–present) ===
The Philippines Football League is the national league in the country.

Club	Home locality	Home venue	First season	Status	Citation
Azkals Development Club	Carmona, Cavite	PFF National Training Center	2020	Active	
Aguilas–UMak	Makati	University of Makati Stadium	2017	Active	
Don Bosco Garelli	Makati	—	2024	Inactive (since 2025–26)	
Dynamic Herb Cebu	Talisay, Cebu	Dynamic Herb Sports Complex	2022–23	Active	
Global	—	—	2017	Club License Suspended (since 2020)	
Green Archers United	Lipa, Batangas	Aboitiz Pitch	2019	Defunct (since 2020)	
Ilocos United	Vigan	Quirino Stadium (In Bantay, Ilocos Sur)	2017	Inactive (since 2018)	
JPV Marikina	Marikina	Marikina Sports Complex	2017	Inactive (since 2019)	
Kaya–Iloilo	Iloilo City	Iloilo Sports Complex	2017	Active	
Loyola (formerly known as Meralco Manila in 2017)	Manila	—	2017	Inactive (since 2024–25)	
Maharlika	Taguig	McKinley Hill Stadium	2020	Active	
Manila Digger	Taguig	—	2024	Active	
Manila Montet	Manila	Rizal Memorial Stadium	2024	Inactive (since 2024)	
Mendiola 1991	Imus, Cavite	City of Imus Grandstand and Track Oval	2019	Active	
One Taguig	Taguig	—	2024	Inactive (since 2025–26)	
PFF Youth National Team	Carmona, Cavite	PFF National Training Center	2024–25	Inactive (since 2024–25)	
Philippine Air Force	Pasay	—	2019	Inactive (since 2024)	
Philippine Army	Taguig	—	2024	Active	
Stallion Laguna	Biñan, Laguna	Biñan Football Stadium	2017	Active	
Tuloy	Muntinlupa	—	2024	Active	
United City (formerly known as Ceres–Negros from 2017–2020)	Capas, Tarlac	New Clark City Athletics Stadium	2017	Inactive (since 2024)	

=== Copa Paulino Alcantara ===
Aside from the PFL teams, the following are teams which took part in the Copa Paulino Alcantara.

- Club De Fútbol Manila
- Pilipinas Dragons

== Defunct leagues ==
=== United Football League (2010–16) ===
==== Division I (2010–16) ====
- Ceres (2015–16)
- Global (2011–16)
- Green Archers United (2010–16)
- Kaya (2010–16)
- Loyola Meralco Sparks (2010–16)
- Manila Jeepney (2015)
- Manila Nomads (2012–13, 2016)
- Mendiola (2010)
- Pachanga Diliman (2013–15)
- Philippine Air Force (2010–13)
- Philippine Army (2010–15)
- Philippine Navy (2010–12)
- Stallion (2012–16)
- Team Socceroo (2014–15)
- Union Internacional Manila (2010)

2016 season only

There was only a single division in the 2016 UFL season. The following are clubs which competed that have no prior participation at Division I in previous seasons.

- Agila
- Forza
- JP Voltes
- Laos

==== Division II (2010–15) ====
- Agila (2012–15)
- Cebu Queen City United (2012)
- Ceres (2014)
- Cimarron (2010, 2012–14)
- Dolphins United (2011–14)
- Forza (2012–15)
- Global (2010)
- Kabuscorp De Laguna (2015)
- JP Voltes (2010–15)
- Laos (2012–15)
- Mama Africa (2010)
- Manila Jeepney (2014)
- Manila Lions (2010–12)
- Manila Nomads (2010–11, 2014)
- Mendiola (2015)
- Pachanga Diliman (2012)
- Pasargad (2011, 2015)
- Philippine Air Force (2014)
- Philippine Navy (2013–14)
- Team Socceroo (2012–13)
- Stallion (2011)
- Sunken Garden United (2010–12)
- Union Internacional Manila (2011–14)
- United South (2010)

== Others ==
These are teams that did not compete in the national league, they only made an appearance on the PFF National Club Championship, UFL Cup, or other defunct national leagues.

UFL Cup

- General Trias International
- Garuda PH

PFF National Men's Club Championship

- ERCO BRO Nationals
- Flame United
- General Trias International
- M'lang

Other

- Bohemian Sporting Club
- Carrigans FC (Weekend Futbol League)
- Cheng Hua
- M. Lhuillier Jewelers

== See also ==
- List of women's football clubs in the Philippines
