= 2013 United Football League =

United Football League Division 1
- Season: 2013
- Champions: Stallion FC
- Relegated: Philippine Air Force
- Matches: 90
- Goals: 338 (3.76 per match)
- Top goalscorer: (Spain) Rufo Sánchez (18 Goals)
- Highest scoring: Loyola Meralco Sparks 10–1 Philippine Army
- Longest winning run: 8 games Stallion FC
- Longest unbeaten run: 8 games Global; Stallion FC
- Longest winless run: 9 games Philippine Air Force
- Longest losing run: 9 games Philippine Air Force

United Football League Division 2
- Season: 2013
- Champions: Team Socceroo
- Promoted: Team Socceroo
- Matches: 72
- Goals: 267 (3.71 per match)
- Top goalscorer: (South Korea) Jeong Woo Lee (14 goals)
- Highest scoring: Forza 4-5 Team Socceroo; Team Socceroo 8–1 Laos
- Longest winning run: 16 games Team Socceroo
- Longest unbeaten run: 16 games Team Socceroo
- Longest winless run: 11 games Manila All-Japan
- Longest losing run: 4 games Dolphins United

The 2013 United Football League was the fourth season of the UFL since its establishment as a semi-professional league in 2009.

Global FC are the defending champions, having won the previous Division 1 of the 2012 United Football League season. The season features 9 teams from the 2012 United Football League Division 1 and one new team promoted from the 2012 United Football League Division 2. Pachanga Diliman replaced the relegated Navy. The 2013 Division 1 league play kicked off on February 5, 2013 while the Division 2 scheduled to kick off its first match between Dolphins United and Cebu Queen City United on February 9, 2013 at the Emperador Stadium but Cebu Queen City United did not show up in the game time.

Stallion FC clinched the United Football League Division 1 championship after Kaya came away with a 3-2 victory against Global at the Emperador Stadium in Mckinley Hill in Taguig June 13, 2013.

== Teams ==
Ten teams in Division 1 and Division 2 contest for this years' league title. Pachanga Diliman from 2012 UFL Division 2 to replace relegated Navy. Two 2012 UFL Division 2 sides Manila Lions and Sunken Garden United did not participate in this year's league contest after they finished 11th and 12th spot respectively in 2012 league season.

On March 1, 2013, the UFL management has officially ruled out Cebu Queen City United from participating after the club apparently withdrawn when the club’s request for home games was turned down by the league.

== Clubs by division ==
Division 1
Club	Head coach	Captain	Kit manufacturer	Shirt sponsor
Global	(Scotland) Brian Reid	(Japan) Yu Hoshide	LGR Athletic	Kia
Green Archers United	(Philippines) Rodolfo Alicante	(Philippines) Chieffy Caligdong	LGR Athletic	Globe Telecom
Kaya	(Australia) David Perkovic	(Philippines) Anton del Rosario	LGR Athletic	LBC Express, Inc.
Loyola Meralco Sparks	(Philippines) Vincent Santos	(Philippines) James Younghusband	LGR Athletic	Meralco
Manila Nomads	(Scotland) John Jofre	(Netherlands) Randy Musters	AtletA	
Pachanga Diliman	(Philippines) Noel Marcaida	(Cameroon) Yves Ashime	Mizuno	Victory Liner
PSG	(Iran) Esmaeil Sedigh	(Iran) Jaham Taher	LGR Athletic	Cord Epoxy
Philippine Air Force	(Philippines) Leo Alfred Jaena	(Philippines) Ian Araneta		Philippine Air Force
Philippine Army	(Philippines) Patricio Bumidang, Jr.	(Philippines) Roel Gener	LGR Athletic	
Stallion FC	(Philippines) Ernie Nierras	(Philippines) Reuben Doctora Jr.	Nike	Sta. Lucia Land Inc.

Division 2
Club	Head coach	Team captain	Kit manufacturer	Shirt sponsor
Agila	(Philippines) John Paul Mérida	(Philippines) Mark Alvin Valeroso	Adidas	
Cebu Queen City United	(Philippines) Mario Ceniza	(Philippines) Jan Michael Flores		
Cimarron	(Philippines) Stephen Permanes	(Ghana) Bismark Frimpong	Adidas	Antonov Vodka
Dolphins United	(Philippines) Greg Calawod	(Philippines) Romnick Echin		OLM
Forza FC	(Malaysia) Azlan Nazir	(Philippines) Allan Auman	LGR Athletic or? Orient Freight	
Laos FC	(Philippines) Rolando Pinero	(Philippines) Rolly Lear		
Manila All-Japan	(Japan) Shinichiro Maeno	(Japan) Yuki Tanaka		Cebu General Services, Inc.
Philippine Navy	(Philippines) Narciso Rosima	(Philippines) Loreto Kalalang	LGR Athletic	RedJuice
Team Socceroo	(Philippines) Nolan Manito	(Philippines) Michael Reyes	LGR Athletic	Vcargo Worldwide
Union Internacional Manila	(Germany) Jorge Muller	(Spain) Ivan Meilan	Rudy Project	

== Managerial changes ==
Division 1
Team	Outgoing head coach	Manner of departure	Incoming head coach
Global	(Philippines) Dan Palami	End of caretaker position	(Scotland) Brian Reid
Loyola	(South Korea) Kim Chul-Soo	Mutual consent	(Philippines) Vincent Santos
Kaya	(Philippines) Michael Angelo Alvarez	Resigned	(Uruguay) Maor Rozen
Kaya	(Uruguay) Maor Rozen	Resigned	(Australia) David Perkovic
Manila Nomads	(England) Michael Denison	Resigned	(Scotland) John Jofre
Pachanga Diliman	(Philippines) Norman Fegidero	Resigned	(Philippines) Salvador Alberto Salvacion
Pachanga Diliman	(Philippines) Salvador Alberto Salvacion	Resigned	(Philippines) Noel Marcaida
Philippine Air Force	(Philippines) Edzel Bracamonte	Resigned	(Philippines) Leo Alfred Jaena

Division 2
Team	Outgoing head coach	Manner of departure	Incoming head coach
Agila	(Philippines) Carlo Jose Rodriguez	Resigned	(Philippines) John Paul Mérida
Cimarron	(Philippines) Salvador Alberto Salvacion	Transferred (to Pachanga Diliman)	(Philippines) Noel Marcaida
Cimarron	(Philippines) Noel Marcaida	Transferred (to Pachanga Diliman)	(Philippines) Stephen Permanes
Laos	(Philippines) Ronald Patulin	Resigned	(Philippines) Rolando Pinero
Manila All-Japan	(Japan) Ryo Kono	Mutual consent	(Japan) Shinichiro Maeno
Navy	(Philippines) Marlon Maro	Resigned	(Philippines) Narciso Rosima
Team Socceroo	(Philippines) Alfredo Estacion	Resigned	(Philippines) Nolan Manito
Union Internacional Manila	(Philippines) Rafael Rodriguez	Mutual consent	(Germany) Jorge Muller

== Venues ==
Division 1
Stadium	Location
Rizal Memorial Stadium	Manila
Emperador Stadium	Taguig

Division 2
Stadium	Location
Emperador Stadium	Taguig

== League table and results ==
=== Division 1 ===
Pos	Team	Pld	W	D	L	GF	GA	GD	Pts	Qualification or relegation
1	Stallion (C)	18	15	1	2	60	22	+38	46	
2	Global	18	14	1	3	47	12	+35	43	
3	Loyola	18	11	5	2	50	18	+32	38	
4	Kaya	18	8	7	3	35	21	+14	31	
5	Pachanga Diliman	18	9	1	8	28	28	0	28	
6	Green Archers United	18	7	3	8	36	36	0	24	
7	Pasargad	18	6	3	9	38	38	0	21	
8	Manila Nomads	18	3	4	11	16	43	−27	13	
9	Philippine Army (O)	18	2	1	15	20	62	−42	7	Qualification to the 2013 Relegation playoffs
10	Philippine Air Force (R)	18	2	0	16	9	59	−50	6	Relegation to the 2014 UFL Division 2

Updated to match(es) played on 20 June 2013. Source: rsssf.com, soccerway.com
Rules for classification: 1) Points; 2) Goal Difference; 3) Goals Scored
(C) Champions; (O) Play-off winners; (R) Relegated

Home \ Away	GLO	GAU	KAY	LMS	NOM	PAC	PSG	PAF	PA	STA
Global		5–1	2–3	0–2	2–1	4–0	2–0	2–0	3–0	1–0
Green Archers United	0–4		1–2	1–1	2–1	0–2	3–0	4–2	5–1	1–3
Kaya	3–2	3–3		3–1	1–1	1–1	1–1	4–0	3–0	1–2
Loyola	1–1	2–0	1–1		5–0	4–1	3–0	2–0	10–1	1–1
Manila Nomads	0–4	1–4	0–0	2–2		1–0	0–0	1–0	0–3	3–6
Pachanga Diliman	0–3	1–2	1–0	0–1	3–0		2–1	5–1	3–2	0–2
PSG	0–2	2–1	2–2	2–4	7–2	2–3		5–0	4–0	0–4
Philippine Air Force	0–2	1–4	0–1	0–4	2–0	0–3	0–6		0–3	2–7
Philippine Army	0–6	1–1	0–4	1–4	1–3	1–2	4–5	0–1		1–6
Stallion	1–2	4–3	3–2	4–2	1–0	3–1	5–1	6–0	2–1	

Updated to match(es) played on June 20, 2013, 23:00. Source: United Football League (Philippines) soccerway
Legend: Blue = home team win; Yellow = draw; Red = away team win.

=== Division 2 ===
Pos	Team	Pld	W	D	L	GF	GA	GD	Pts	Qualification or relegation
1	Team Socceroo (C, P)	16	16	0	0	60	14	+46	48	Promotion to the 2014 UFL Division 1
2	Union Internacional Manila	16	9	4	3	32	23	+9	31	Qualification to the 2013 Promotion playoffs
3	Forza	16	8	3	5	38	26	+12	27	
4	Agila	16	9	0	7	30	34	−4	27	
5	Laos	16	6	3	7	29	38	−9	21	
6	Philippine Navy	16	4	4	8	17	27	−10	16	
7	Cimarron	16	4	2	10	27	36	−9	14	
8	Manila All-Japan	16	2	5	9	16	34	−18	11	
9	Dolphins United	16	3	1	12	21	38	−17	10	
10	Cebu Queen City United (E)	0	0	0	0	0	0	0	0	Disqualified (Note: Cebu Queen City United was officially ruled out by UFL management after the club withdrawn from the league as the club's request for home games in Cebu was turned down by the UFL.)

Updated to match(es) played on 20 June 2013. Source: rsssf.com
Rules for classification: 1) Points; 2) Goal Difference; 3) Goals Scored
(C) Champions; (E) Eliminated; (P) Promoted
Notes:

Home \ Away	AGI	CQC (Note: All fixtures involving Cebu Queen City United have been nullified after the UFL management officially ruled out the club from participating.)	CIM	DOL	FOR	LAO	AJP	PN	SOC	UIM
Agila			1–0	3–2	1–6	3–2	3–1	0–1	1–4	2–3
Cebu Queen City United (Note: All fixtures involving Cebu Queen City United have been nullified after the UFL management officially ruled out the club from participating.)										
Cimarron	1–3			4–2	1–4	4–1	3–2	1–1	0–1	2–3
Dolphins United	1–2		2–2		0–5	1–2	1–2	4–0	0–2	1–2
Forza	3–1		3–2	1–3		1–2	2–2	3–2	4–5	1–1
Laos	2–3		2–1	2–1	3–1		2–2	3–1	1–3	1–2
Manila All-Japan	1–4		1–2	0–1	0–2	1–1		0–0	0–4	1–3
Philippine Navy	0–1		1–0	4–1	0–0	2–0	1–2		0–1	0–3
Team Socceroo	5–2		5–1	4–1	2–1	8–1	5–0	6–2		2–0
Union Internacional Manila	2–0		4–3	3–0	0–1	4–4	0–0	2–2	0–3	

Updated to match(es) played on June 20, 2013, 21:00. Source: United Football League (Philippines)
Legend: Blue = home team win; Yellow = draw; Red = away team win.

== Promotion-relegation playoffs ==
Philippine Army, the 9th-placed team of Division 1 will face the 2nd-placed 2013 UFL Division 2 side Union Internacional Manila in a two-legged playoff. The winner on aggregate score after both matches will earn a spot in the 2014 UFL Division 1.

Team 1	Agg.	Team 2	1st leg	2nd leg
Philippine Army	8–4	Union Internacional Manila	5–3	3–1

1st Leg

July 7, 2013
20:00 PST

Philippine Army	5–3	Union Internacional Manila
Margarse 40'; Brillantes 49', 67'; Vestal 56'; Lobaton 76'		Meilan 3'; Stanley 19'; Owusu 90' (pen.)

Emperador Stadium, Taguig

2nd Leg

July 14, 2013
17:00 PST

Union Internacional Manila	1–3	Philippine Army
Stanley 63'		Gener 35'; Vestal 65', 83'

Emperador Stadium, Taguig

Philippine Army won 8–4 on aggregate and retained its United Football League Division 1 spot for the 2014 season.

== Top goalscorers ==
Correct as of 23:00, June 20, 2013
Source: UFL Phil

Division 1
Rank	Player	Club	Goals
1	(Spain) Rufo Sánchez	Stallion FC	18
2	(Philippines) Phil Younghusband	Loyola	17
3	(Philippines) Mark Hartmann	Loyola	13
3	(Sudan) Izzeldin El Habbib	Global FC	13
5	(Nigeria) Emmanuel Mbata	PSG	12
6	(Philippines) Chieffy Caligdong	Green Archers United	9
7	(South Korea) Lee Joo-Young	Stallion FC	8
8	(Philippines) Ian Araneta	Philippine Air Force	7
9	(Philippines) Nathan Alquiros	Stallion FC	6
9	(Philippines) Anton del Rosario	Kaya	6
9	(Philippines) Jeffrey Christiaens	Global FC	6
9	(Philippines) Jesus Joaquin Melliza	Green Archers United	6
9	(Philippines) Christian Pasilan	Green Archers United	6
9	(Philippines) Meliton Pelayo	Philippine Army	6
9	(Nigeria) Kalilou Toure	PSG	6

Division 2
Rank	Player	Club	Goals
1	(South Korea) Jeong Woo Lee	Team Socceroo	14
2	(Philippines) Jerome Cuyos	Dolphins United	12
3	(Ivory Coast) Dibi Pascal	Forza	11
4	(South Korea) Shin Seok Jeon	Team Socceroo	10
5	(Ghana) Ebenezer Owusu	Union Internacional Manila	8
6	(Spain) Ivan Meilan	Union Internacional Manila	7
6	(Ghana) Bismark Frimpong	Cimarron	7
6	Olayemi Bakare	Agila	7
9	(Italy) Philip Zemen	Agila	6
9	(Philippines) Richard Leyble	Navy	6
9	(South Korea) Hyeon Seung Lee	Team Socceroo	6

== Own goals ==
Division 1
Rank	Player	For	Club	Own Goal
1	(France) Bafio Magassa	Global	Manila Nomads	2
1	(France) Bafio Magassa	Stallion FC	Manila Nomads	2
2	(Philippines) Edward Rances	Global	Pachanga Diliman	1
3	(Philippines) Carli de Murga	Kaya	Global	1

Division 2
Rank	Player	For	Club	Own Goal
1	(Japan) Yuki Itoyama	Cimarron	Manila All-Japan	1
2	(Philippines) Henderson Campo	Cimarron	Forza	1

== Hat-tricks ==
Division 1
Player	For	Against	Result	Date
(Spain) Rufo Sánchez	Stallion FC	Philippine Air Force	7–2^{‡}	7 March 2013
(Philippines) Robert Cañedo	Pachanga Diliman	Philippine Air Force	5–1	21 March 2013
(Philippines) Phil Younghusband	Loyola Meralco Sparks	Philippine Army	10–1^{‡}	16 April 2013
(Philippines) Mark Hartmann	Loyola Meralco Sparks	Philippine Army	10–1^{‡}	16 April 2013
(Spain) Rufo Sánchez	Stallion FC	Philippine Army	6–1^{‡}	30 April 2013
(Senegal) Oussenynou Diop	Pachanga Diliman	PSG	3–2	4 May 2013

Division 2
Player	For	Against	Result	Date
(Philippines) Jerome Cuyos	Dolphins United	Philippine Navy	4–0	3 March 2013
(South Korea) Jeong Woo Lee	Team Socceroo	Agila	4–1	14 April 2013
(South Korea) Shin Seok Jeon	Team Socceroo	Navy	6–2	5 May 2013
(South Korea) Hyeon Seung Lee	Team Socceroo	Forza	5–4	26 May 2013
Olayemi Bakare	Agila	Manila All-Japan	4–1	1 June 2013

- ^{‡} Player scored more than three goals

== Scoring ==
=== Division 1 ===
- First goal of the season: Relan Bretaña for Philippine Army against Loyola (February 5, 2013)
- Fastest goal of the season: 1 Minute – Mark Hartmann for Loyola against Philippine Air Force (February 21, 2013) and Agbayomi Olowoyeye for Green Archers United against Philippine Army (May 18, 2013)
- First own goal of the season: 50 Minutes – Bafio Magassa of Manila Nomads for Global (February 14, 2013)
- Widest winning margin: 9 goals
  - Loyola Meralco Sparks 10–1 Philippine Army (April 16, 2013)
- Highest scoring game: 11 goals
  - Loyola Meralco Sparks 10–1 Philippine Army (April 16, 2013)
- Most goals scored in a match by a single team: 10 goals
  - Loyola Meralco Sparks 10–1 Philippine Army (April 16, 2013)
- Most goals scored in a match by a losing team: 4 goals
  - Philippine Army 4–5 PSG (June 17, 2013)

=== Division 2 ===
- First goal of the season: Own goal by Manila All-Japan player Yuki Itoyama scored for Cimarron (February 10, 2013)
- Fastest goal of the season: 1 Minute – Mohammad Ghasemi for Laos against Dolphins United (May 26, 2013)
- First own goal of the season: 6 Minutes – Yuki Itoyama of Manila All-Japan for Cimarron (February 10, 2013)
- Widest winning margin: 7 goals
  - Team Socceroo 8–1 Laos (June 20, 2013)
- Highest scoring game: 9 goals
  - Forza 4–5 Team Socceroo (May 26, 2013)
  - Team Socceroo 8–1 Laos (June 20, 2013)
- Most goals scored in a match by a single team: 8 goals
  - Team Socceroo 8–1 Laos (June 20, 2013)
- Most goals scored in a match by a losing team: 4 goals
  - Forza 4–5 Team Socceroo (May 26, 2013)

== Season Awards ==
=== Team Awards ===
The following teams are awarded by the United Football League in the ceremony.

Division 1
Club	Award
Stallion FC	Champions
Global	1st-Runner Up
Loyola Meralco Sparks	Fair Play Award

Division 2
Club	Award
Team Socceroo	Champions
Manila All-Japan	Fair Play Award

=== Individual awards ===
The following players are awarded by the United Football League Committee in the ceremony.

Division 1
Player	Club	Award
(Spain) Rufo Sánchez	Stallion FC	Golden Ball
(Spain) Rufo Sánchez	Stallion FC	Golden Boot(18 goals)
(Ivory Coast) Roland Sadia	Global	Best Goalkeeper

Division 2
Player	Club	Award
(South Korea) Jeong Woo Lee	Team Socceroo	Golden Ball
(South Korea) Jeong Woo Lee	Team Socceroo	Golden Boot(14 goals)
(South Korea) Seung Seok Seo	Team Socceroo	Best Goalkeeper
