= Carli de Murga =

Filipino footballer (born 1988)

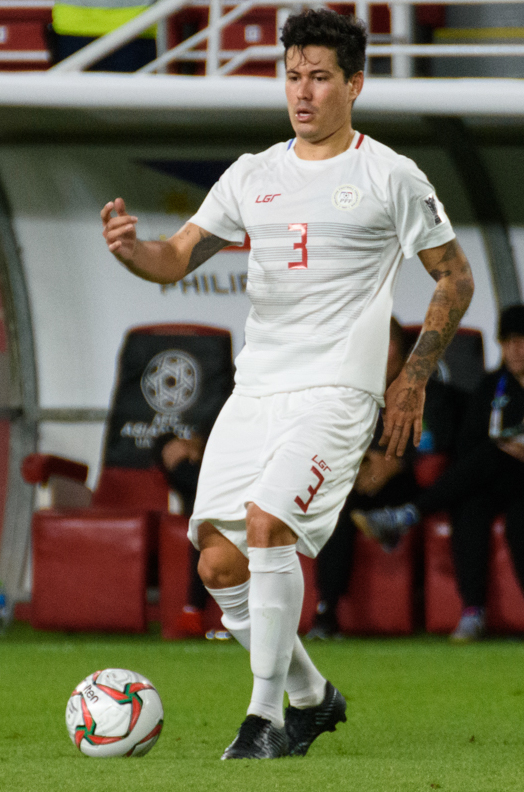
- De Murga playing for Philippines at the 2019 AFC Asian Cup

Personal information
- Full name: Carlos Alberto Olaivar Martinez de Murga
- Birth name: Carlos Alberto Martínez de Murga Olaivar
- Date of birth: 30 November 1988 (age 37)
- Place of birth: El Puerto de Santa María, Spain
- Height: 1.80 m (5 ft 11 in)
- Position: Centre-back

Youth career
- Cádiz

Senior career*
Years	Team	Apps	(Gls)
2006–2009	Cádiz B	36	(1)
2009–2010	Atl. Sanluqueño	7	(1)
2010–2011	Portuense	32	(2)
2012–2014	Global	32	(10)
2014–2019	Ceres–Negros	115	(9)
2020	Chonburi	11	(1)
2021	Terengganu	17	(1)
2022	Johor Darul Ta'zim	9	(1)
2023	Kelantan	6	(0)
2023–2024	Barito Putera	22	(0)
2024	One Taguig	0	(0)

International career^{‡}
2011	Philippines U23	4	(0)
2011–2023	Philippines	58	(4)
- * Club domestic league appearances and goals as of 29 April 2024 ‡ National team caps and goals as of 23 November 2023

Carlos Alberto Olaivar Martinez de Murga (born 30 November 1988), known as Carli de Murga, is a former professional footballer who played as a centre-back. Born in Spain, he represented the Philippines at international level.

== Club career ==
=== With Spanish clubs ===
Born in El Puerto de Santa María, Cádiz, Martínez de Murga was a youth graduate at hometown club Cádiz CF. He played with Cádiz B in the Tercera División during the 2008–09 season. He then moved to Atlético Sanluqueño during the 2009–10 season. He then signed for Racing Club Portuense for the 2010–11 season. In his stint for RC Portuense, he scored a goal in the 2–1 loss against P.D. Rociera.

=== Global F.C. ===
In January 2012, he signed up for Filipino side Global FC for the 2011–12 United Football League (UFL) season. He made his debut in the 2–1 win against Philippine Army. He scored his first goal in the 5–1 win against Manila Nomads. On 31 March 2012, he scored a hat trick against the Kaya that result in a 5–1 victory.

=== Ceres F.C. ===
De Murga was signed in by Ceres F.C. under a 3-year contract in February 2014. By the time of the signing de Murga was a free agent having previously played for Global. The footballer came from an anterior cruciate ligament on his right knee preventing him from playing football for five months. He debuted for Ceres at the 2014 United Football League Division 2 match against Manila Jeepney F.C. De Murga was used a substitute coming in for Angelo Marasigan in the 69th minute. Ceres won with the scoreline of 2–1.

De Murga helped Ceres win the 2014 UFL FA League Cup by defeating Global F.C. in the final played on 6 November 2014 with a scoreline of 2–1. However, Ceres was forced to make a substitution after de Murga sustained an injury on his left knee after colliding with a Global defender. The injury was later determined to be an ACL tear forcing de Murga out once again from competitive football for about a year and two months.

A surgery to treat his injury was unsuccessful and at one point during his recovery, de Murga's doctor hinted him that he should retire from football. De Murga refused to heed the advice and a second surgery proved to be successful.

In early 2016, de Murga was fielded in a friendly in Singapore. On 7 February 2016, he was later played against Loyola Meralco Sparks F.C. in Ceres' first 2016 UFL Cup match and scored a brace, marking his return in the UFL. Loyola scored the only other goal in the match that ended in a 2–1 win for Ceres.

He remained with Ceres, when it joined the Philippines Football League in 2017.

== International career ==
Martínez de Murga discovered the Philippines team through a friend who was a Spanish league teammate of Philippines international Ángel Guirado. Through the social networking website Facebook, he was able to contact Guirado, together with his relatives, and was able to secure his requirements for him to suit up for the national team. De Murga's mother Jacqueline Olaivar is from Quezon City, Philippines. She migrated to Spain in the 1980s and met her husband Antonio while they both worked in a supermarket there.

In September 2011, he joined the national team training pool and was named in the final 20-man squad for the 2011 Long Teng Cup and the provisional Philippines under-23 squad for the 2011 Southeast Asian Games. In the Long Teng Cup, he made his full international debut in the 3–3 draw against Hong Kong.

He made his first appearance for the under-23 national team in the 3–1 loss against Vietnam in the opening match of the 2011 Southeast Asian Games.

On 16 March 2012 in a semi-final match against Turkmenistan for the 2012 AFC Challenge Cup, he became a goalkeeper for the remainder of the second half injury time after Neil Etheridge was sent off from the field having received a straight red card.

On 12 June 2012, he scored his first international goal for the Philippines in a 3–0 win against Guam. He scored once again against Macau on 27 September 2012 in a 5–0 victory in the 2012 Philippine Peace Cup.

=== International goals ===
Scores and results list the Philippines' goal tally first.

No	Date	Venue	Opponent	Score	Result	Competition
2012
1.	12 June 2012	Panaad Park and Stadium, Bacolod, Philippines	Guam	2–0	3–0	Friendly
2.	27 September 2012	Rizal Memorial Stadium, Manila, Philippines	Macau	3–0	5–0	2012 Philippine Peace Cup
2013
3.	24 March 2013	Rizal Memorial Stadium, Manila, Philippines	Cambodia	8–0	8–0	2014 AFC Challenge Cup qualification
2018
4.	17 November 2018	Kuala Lumpur Stadium, Kuala Lumpur, Malaysia	Timor-Leste	3–0	3–2	2018 AFF Championship

== Acting career ==
Murga started his acting career by starring in the music video for "Sometimes It Happens", a song entry for the second Philippine Popular Music Festival written by Adrienne Buenaventura & Niño Regalado and interpreted by Ace Libre of Never the Strangers.

== Honours ==
Johor Darul Ta'zim

- Piala Sumbangsih: 2022
