= 2011 UFL Cup =

2011 United Football Cup
Tournament details
- Country: Philippines
- Teams: 28

Final positions
- Champions: Philippine Air Force (2nd title)
- Runners-up: Loyola Meralco Sparks

Tournament statistics
- Matches played: 58
- Goals scored: 293 (5.05 per match)
- Top goal scorer(s): (Philippines) Phil Younghusband (25 goals)

Awards
- Best player: (Philippines) Mark Hartmann

The 2011 United Football Cup was the third edition of the United Football Cup that ran from mid-October to mid-December 2011. This edition consisted of 28 teams which were separated into seven groups with the top two teams of the group advancing to the round of 16. The two best third placed teams claimed the remaining two slots in the round of 16.

In the previous year the clubs were initially separated into four equal groups, with a single round-robin played in each to divide the groups into top-two and bottom-two clusters. The top two of every group qualified for the knock-out stage while the bottom-two clubs of each set battled for the Plate. The eight teams who made it to the knock-out stages were given the right of playing in the league first division while teams who played for the Plate proceeded to the league second division.

Philippine Air Force successfully grabbed their second title.

== Group stage ==
Key to colours in group tables
Group winners and runners-up advance to the knock-out stage
Third-placed teams that will be ranked from highest to lowest, two highest will advance to the knock-out stage

All times are Philippine Standard Time (PST) – UTC+8.

=== Group A ===
Team	Pld	W	D	L	GF	GA	GD	Pts
Manila Nomads	3	3	0	0	13	0	+13	9
Manila Lions	3	2	0	1	6	3	+3	6
Union Internacional Manila	3	0	1	2	1	7	−6	1
Baguio	3	0	1	2	2	12	−10	1

October 29, 2011 (Note: Originally scheduled at 13:00 on October 9 at the Alabang Country Club Field A.)	Manila Lions	2 – 1	Baguio	University of Makati Stadium, Makati
19:00	M. Tan 6'; Hui 69'	Report	Corpuz 73'

October 20, 2011 (Note: Originally scheduled at 16:00 on October 9 but was postponed due to the unplayable pitch from heavy rain.)	Manila Nomads	2 – 0	Union Internacional Manila	Nomads Sports Club, Parañaque
20:00	Loic 69', 78'	Report

October 30, 2011 (Note: Originally scheduled at 13:00 on October 16 at the Alabang Country Club Field B.)	Union Internacional Manila	1 – 1	Baguio	University of Makati Stadium, Makati
17:00	Pascual 53'	Report	Abadalla 75'

October 16, 2011	Manila Lions	0 – 2	Manila Nomads	Nomads Sports Club, Parañaque
16:00		Report	Connolly 38'; McCready 52'

October 23, 2011	Baguio	0 – 9	Manila Nomads	Nomads Sports Club, Parañaque
16:00		Report	Connolly 6', 16', 32'; Borrill 11', 18', 58', 69', 88'; Hacker 49'

October 23, 2011	Union Internacional Manila	0 – 4	Manila Lions	Alabang Country Club Field B, Muntinlupa
13:00		Report	M. Tan 1', 86'; Hui 72'; Zhang Zhe 82'

=== Group B ===
Team	Pld	W	D	L	GF	GA	GD	Pts
Loyola Meralco Sparks	3	3	0	0	27	2	+25	9
Team Socceroo	3	2	0	1	4	15	−11	6
Agila	3	1	0	2	7	8	−1	3
Internacionale FC	3	0	0	3	1	13	−12	0

October 25, 2011 (Note: Originally scheduled at 15:00 on October 9 at the Alabang Country Club Field A.)	Team Socceroo	1 – 0	Internacionale FC	University of Makati Stadium, Makati
19:00	Strangheti 44'	Report

October 27, 2011 (Note: Originally scheduled at 15:00 on October 9 but was postponed due to the unplayable pitch from heavy rain.)	Loyola Meralco Sparks	5 – 1	Agila	University of Makati Stadium, Makati
20:00	P. Younghusband 34', 66', 78'; Cortina 40'; Versario 70'	Report	Potenciano 60'

October 15, 2011	Team Socceroo	1 – 15	Loyola Meralco Sparks	Rizal Memorial Stadium, Manila
14:00	M. Reyes 55'	Report	M.A. Hartmann 6', 25', 27', 63', 90'; M.J. Hartmann 9'; P. Younghusband 23', 29', 31', 39', 44', 80', 83'; Morallo 42'; Cortina 72'

October 16, 2011	Agila	5 – 1	Internacionale FC	Alabang Sports Club Field A, Muntinlupa
11:00	Mabanag 39'; M. Madrona 46'; Ingles 51'; A.N. Tahil 87', 88'	Report	McMahon 42'

October 23, 2011	Agila	1 – 2	Team Socceroo	Alabang Country Club Field B, Muntinlupa
15:00	M. Madrona 41'	Report	D. Matsunaga 39'; Evangelista 66'

October 23, 2011	Internacionale FC	0 – 7	Loyola Meralco Sparks	University of Makati Stadium, Makati
17:00		Report	P. Younghusband 15', 18', 31', 50'; M.A. Hartmann 59', 61'; Borja 86'

=== Group C ===
Team	Pld	W	D	L	GF	GA	GD	Pts
Pachanga	3	2	1	0	8	2	+6	7
Stallion FC	3	2	0	1	11	4	+7	6
Global	3	1	1	1	7	5	+2	4
Cebu Queen City United	3	0	0	3	0	15	−15	0

October 8, 2011	Global	2 – 3	Stallion FC	Rizal Memorial Stadium, Manila
16:00	Sery 66'; I. Elhabbib 84'	Report	Gustilo 10'; Simpron 44'; R. Doctora 54'

October 29, 2011 (Note: Originally scheduled at 13:00 on October 9 but was postponed due to the unplayable pitch from heavy rain.)	Cebu Queen City United	0 – 4	Pachanga	University of Makati Stadium, Manila
14:00		Report	Lagrimas 13'; Palomo 42'; Kigbu 43'; Bedic 63'

October 16, 2011	Cebu Queen City United	0 – 3	Global	Alabang Country Club Field A, Muntinlupa
15:00		Report	I. Elhabbib 39', 46', 51'

October 16, 2011	Stallion FC	0 – 2	Pachanga	University of Makati Stadium, Makati
15:00		Report	Bedic 28'; Ojamire 44'

October 22, 2011	Stallion FC	8 – 0	Cebu Queen City United	Rizal Memorial Stadium, Manila
14:00	Lee Joo-Young 10'; Pi Young-Jae 17'; R. Doctora 27', 78', 80'; Kim Jae-Woo 55', 66', 68'	Report

October 23, 2011	Pachanga	2 – 2	Global	University of Makati Stadium, Makati
15:00	Bedic 50'; Leonora 70'	Report	I. Elhabbib 71'; Borromeo 89'

=== Group D ===
Team	Pld	W	D	L	GF	GA	GD	Pts
Kaya	3	3	0	0	14	3	+11	9
Diliman	3	2	0	1	18	4	+14	6
ABC Stars	3	0	1	2	2	14	−12	1
Schwarz	3	0	1	2	2	15	−13	1

October 20, 2011 (Note: Originally scheduled on October 8 but was postponed due to the unplayable pitch from heavy rain.)	Kaya	5 – 0	Schwarz	University of Makati Stadium, Makati
19:00	Burkey 9' (pen.), 12', 22', 66'; Dagroh 24'	Report

October 9, 2011	Diliman	7 – 0	ABC Stars	Alabang Country Club Field A, Muntinlupa
11:00	Valmayor 14', 76', 84'; Santos 32'; Gonzales 56', 65'; Zerrudo 60'	Report

October 15, 2011	Diliman	2 – 3	Kaya	Rizal Memorial Stadium, Manila
16:00	Valmayor 3'; Zerrudo 39'	Report	Burkey 21', 50' (pen.), 75'

October 16, 2011	Schwarz	1 – 1	ABC Stars	Alabang Country Club Field B, Muntinlupa
15:00	Gatasi 83'	Report	Judal 54'

October 23, 2011	ABC Stars	1 – 6	Kaya	Alabang Country Club Field B, Muntinlupa
11:00	Bravo 44'	Report	Romero 37'; Semblat 45', 83'; Dagroh 50', 67'; Lorenzo 85'

October 23, 2011	Schwarz	1 – 9	Diliman	Alabang Country Club Field A, Muntinlupa
15:00	Cayabyab 60'	Report	Zerrudo 4', 24', 35', 83'; Santos 20', 28', 60'; Valmayor 48'; Nyborg 80'

=== Group E ===
Team	Pld	W	D	L	GF	GA	GD	Pts
Philippine Air Force	3	3	0	0	23	3	+20	9
Philippine Navy	3	2	0	1	12	6	+6	6
Laos FC	3	1	0	2	6	5	+1	3
Manila All-Japan	3	0	0	3	0	27	−27	0

October 25, 2011 (Note: Originally scheduled at 15:00 on October 9 at the Nomads Sports Club but was postponed due to the unplayable pitch from heavy rain.)	Laos FC	0 – 1	Philippine Navy	Nomads Sports Club, Parañaque
20:00		Report	Piñero 19'

October 27, 2011 (Note: Originally scheduled at 18:00 on October 9 but was postponed due to the unplayable pitch from heavy rain.)	Philippine Air Force	13 – 0	Manila All-Japan	Nomads Sports Club, Parañaque
20:00	Palmes 3', 12', 14'; Araneta 6', 15', 28', 34', 37'; Bela-Ong 18'; Caligdong 25', 38'; Dueñas 58'; Rabena 75'	Report

October 16, 2011	Laos FC	1 – 4	Philippine Air Force	University of Makati Stadium, Makati
17:00	Dalman 23'	Report	Araneta 18', 42', 90+1'; Barsales 38'

October 16, 2011	Manila All-Japan	0 – 9	Philippine Navy	Nomads Sports Club, Parañaque
18:00		Report	Fernandez 3', 11'; Piñero 33', 79'; Marcaida 39'; Caminos 57'; Viliran 70', 90+1'; Dimzon 90'

October 22, 2011	Philippine Navy	2 – 6	Philippine Air Force	Rizal Memorial Stadium, Manila
16:00	Torres 89'; Caminos 90+1'	Report	Araneta 36', 71'; Caligdong 44', 73'; Barsales 65'; Subere 83'

October 23, 2011	Manila All-Japan	0 – 5	Laos FC	Nomads Sports Club, Parañaque
18:00		Report	Dalman 9'; Jukes 27', 50'; Ali 37'; Marvin Angeles 80'

=== Group F ===
Team	Pld	W	D	L	GF	GA	GD	Pts
Green Archers United	3	2	1	0	12	1	+11	7
Pasargad	3	1	1	1	4	5	−1	4
Forza	3	1	0	2	6	11	−5	3
Dolphins United	3	1	0	2	4	9	−5	3

October 18, 2011 (Note: Originally scheduled at 19:00 on October 9 at the ASCOM Soccer Field in Taguig but was postponed due to the unplayable pitch from heavy rain.)	Forza	2 – 4	Dolphins United	University of Makati Stadium, Makati
19:00	Pajibo 71', 79'	report	Obero 10', 55', 90'; Echin 62'

October 29, 2011 (Note: Originally scheduled at 17:00 on October 9 at the University of Makati Stadium but was postponed due to the unplayable pitch from heavy rain.)	Green Archers United	1 – 1	Pasargad	Rizal Memorial Stadium, Manila
16:00	Pacquiao 61'	report	Khorasani 90+3'

October 16, 2011	Pasargad	1 – 0	Dolphins United	Alabang Country Club Field A, Muntinlupa
13:00	Emaka 52'	Report

October 16, 2011	Forza	0 – 5	Green Archers United	Nomads Sports Club, Parañaque
20:00		Report	Olowoyeye 7'; Villa 35', 51'; Villareal 66'; Pasinabo 80'

October 23, 2011	Dolphins United	0 – 6	Green Archers United	Alabang Country Club Field A, Muntinlupa
11:00		Report	Pasilan 10', 24', 30'; Villareal 54'; Bocobo 60'; Navarro 70'

October 23, 2011	Forza	4 – 2	Pasargad	Nomads Sports Club, Parañaque
20:00	Pajibo 49'; Celdran 57', 67'; Roa 82'	Report	Seifi 11'; Uche 75'

=== Group G ===
Team	Pld	W	D	L	GF	GA	GD	Pts
Philippine Army	3	3	0	0	24	0	+24	9
Manhur FC	3	1	1	1	4	7	−3	4
Sunken Garden United	3	1	1	1	5	11	−6	4
Garuda PH	3	0	0	3	2	16	−14	0

October 26, 2011 (Note: Originally scheduled at 13:00 on October 9 at the ASCOM Soccer Field in Taguig but was postponed due to the unplayable pitch from heavy rain.)	Garuda PH	1 – 2	Manhur FC	University of Makati Stadium, Makati
19:00	Arman 63'	Report	Emperado 67'; Liao 72' (pen.)

October 21, 2011 (Note: Originally scheduled at 20:00 on October 9 at the Nomads Sports Club but was postponed due to the unplayable pitch from heavy rain.)	Philippine Army	9 – 0	Sunken Garden United	University of Makati Stadium, Makati
19:00	Margarse 7'; Cain 28'; Gener 34'; Vistal 37'; Brillantes 49'; Baron 69'; Bretaña 72'; Becite 84', 89'	Report

October 30, 2011 (Note: Originally scheduled at 11:00 on October 16 at the Alabang Country Club Field A.)	Sunken Garden United	2 – 2	Manhur FC	University of Makati Stadium, Makati
19:00	Jover 38'; Banta 64'	Report	Emperado 10'; Mendez 29'

October 16, 2011	Garuda PH	0 – 11	Philippine Army	University of Makati Stadium, Makati
13:00		Report	Brillantes 1', 23'; Vestal 4', 39'; Margarse 11'; Becite 19', 45'; Gener 50'; Caballero 70'; Dela Cruz 86'; Cain 89'

October 23, 2011	Manhur FC	0 – 4	Philippine Army	University of Makati Stadium, Makati
13:00		Report	Gener 14'; Brillantes 23'; Bedua 46'; Becite 70'

October 23, 2011	Sunken Garden United	3 – 1	Garuda PH	Alabang Country Club A, Muntinlupa
13:00	Del Rosario 36'; Cainglet 46'; Fortuno 85'	Report	Banundi 40'

=== Ranking of group third placed teams ===
The two best third place teams among all groups qualify for the knockout stage. They are determined by the parameters in this order:

1. Highest number of points
2. Goal difference
3. Highest number of goals scored (goals for)

Grp	Team	Pld	W	D	L	GF	GA	GD	Pts
C	Global	3	1	1	1	7	5	+2	4
G	Sunken Garden United	3	1	1	1	5	11	−6	4
E	Laos FC	3	1	0	2	6	5	+1	3
B	Agila	3	1	0	2	7	8	−1	3
F	Forza	3	1	0	2	6	11	−5	3
A	Union Internacional Manila	3	0	1	2	1	7	−6	1
D	ABC Stars	3	0	1	2	2	14	−12	1

== Knockout stage ==
Round of 16
November 26 – Makati
Loyola Meralco Sparks	14
Sunken Garden United	0
November 19 – Makati
Stallion	2
Diliman	1
November 5 – Manila
Manila Nomads	1
Pasargad	0
November 20 – Makati
Team Socceroo	0
Kaya	2
November 20 – Makati
Green Archers United	3
Manila Lions	0
November 5 – Manila
Manhur FC	3
Philippine Air Force	15
November 22 – Makati
Pachanga	0 (4)
Philippine Navy	0 (2)
November 19 – Makati
Global	3
Philippine Army	0

Quarter-finals
November 30 – Makati
Loyola Meralco Sparks	2
Stallion	1
November 26 - Makati
Manila Nomads	0
Kaya	3
November 27 – Parañaque
Green Archers United	1
Philippine Air Force	3
November 26 – Makati
Pachanga	0
Global	1

Semi-finals
December 5 – Manila
Loyola Meralco Sparks	5
Kaya	4
December 5 – Manila
Philippine Air Force	2
Global	0

Final
December 10 – Manila
Loyola Meralco Sparks	0
Philippine Air Force	2
Third place
December 10 – Manila
Kaya	1
Global	2

=== Round of 16 ===
November 5, 2011	Manhur FC	3 – 15	Philippine Air Force	Rizal Memorial Stadium, Manila
14:00	Cuaresma 47'; Emperado 72'; Vangrunderbeek 85'	Report	Palmes 5'; Caligdong 12', 30', 64'; Araneta 13', 21', 24', 28', 48', 56', 82'; Soriano 22', 74'; Bermejo 42'; Bela-Ong 66'

November 5, 2011	Manila Nomads	1 – 0	Pasargad	Rizal Memorial Stadium, Manila
16:00	Musters 71'	Report

Matches were rescheduled since some players playing for the clubs were on national duty as members of the U23 National Team competing in the 2011 Southeast Asian Games in Indonesia. Games originally scheduled on November 6 at the Nomads Sports Club were postponed due to pitch conditions. Games scheduled on that day were Team Socceroo vs Kaya and Green Archers United vs Manila Lions.

On November 10, the UFL Executive Committee released the official schedule of the remaining matches on their official Facebook account. However, on November 16 the Rizal Memorial Stadium officials advised the UFL not to use the pitch in preparation for the Philippines–LA Galaxy match on December 3.

November 19, 2011	Stallion	2 – 1	Diliman	University of Makati Stadium, Makati
14:00	Lee Joo-Young 11'; Braga 45'	Report	Eusebio 10'

November 19, 2011	Global	3 – 0	Philippine Army	University of Makati Stadium, Makati
16:00	I. Elhabbib 20'; Soriano 53', 69'	Report

November 20, 2011	Team Socceroo	0 – 2	Kaya	University of Makati Stadium, Makati
18:00		Report	Omura 50'; Burkey 72'

November 20, 2011	Green Archers United	3 – 0	Manila Lions	University of Makati Stadium, Makati
20:00	Pasinabo 30'; Pacquiao 43'; Romero-Salas 45'	Report

November 22, 2011	Pachanga	0 – 0 (a.e.t.) (4 – 2 p)	Philippine Navy	University of Makati Stadium, Makati
19:00		Report
	Penalties
	Soriano (penalty scored); Bedic (penalty scored); Serios (penalty missed); Diop (penalty scored); Fegidero (penalty scored)		Flores (penalty scored); Marcaida (penalty scored); Sendino (penalty missed); Caminos (penalty missed)

On November 22, the UFL Executive Committee has announced via their official Facebook page that the match between Loyola Meralco Sparks and Sunken Garden United FC at Nomads Sports Club is postponed due to pitch condition.

November 26, 2011	Loyola Meralco Sparks	14 – 0	Sunken Garden United	Nomads Sports Club, Parañaque
20:00	M.A. Hartmann 19', 49', 70', 81'; Morallo 24'; P. Younghusband 31', 42', 56', 64', 78', 87'; J. Younghusband 74'; Cortina 88'; Elnar 89'	Report

=== Quarter-finals ===
November 26, 2011	Pachanga	0 – 1	Global	University of Makati Stadium, Makati
14:00		Report	Gueridonn 27'

November 26, 2011	Kaya	3 – 0	Manila Nomads	University of Makati Stadium, Makati
16:00	Boley 28', 85'; Burkey 72'	Report

November 27, 2011	Philippine Air Force	3 – 1	Green Archers United	University of Makati Stadium, Makati
16:00	Barsales 35'; Tonog 64'; Araneta 69'	Report	Villareal 90+1' (pen.)

November 30, 2011	Loyola Meralco Sparks	2 – 1	Stallion	University of Makati Stadium, Makati
20:00	P. Younghusband 22', 32'	Report	Lee Han-Gi 78'

=== Semi-finals ===
December 5, 2011	Loyola Meralco Sparks	5 – 4	Kaya	Rizal Memorial Stadium, Manila
18:00	P. Younghusband 57', 69' (pen.), 85'; M.A. Hartmann 73'; J. Younghusband 78'	Report	Boley 10'; Dagroh 32', 35'; Burkey 90+5'	Attendance: 3,000

December 5, 2011	Philippine Air Force	2 – 0	Global	Rizal Memorial Stadium, Manila
20:00	Barsales 87'; Soriano 90+5'	Report		Attendance: 3,000

=== Third Place ===
December 10, 2011	Kaya	1 – 2	Global	Rizal Memorial Stadium, Manila
14:00	A. del Rosario 54'	Report	Gueridonn 11'; I. Elhabbib 75'	Attendance: 6,000

=== Finals ===
December 10, 2011	Loyola Meralco Sparks	0 – 2	Philippine Air Force	Rizal Memorial Stadium, Manila
16:00		Report	Araneta 40'; Barsales 89'	Attendance: 6,000

== Top scorers ==
Rank	Player	Club	Goals
1	(Philippines) Phil Younghusband	Loyola Meralco Sparks	25
2	(Philippines) Ian Araneta	Philippine Air Force	19
3	(Philippines) Mark Hartmann	Loyola Meralco Sparks	12
4	(Philippines) Nate Burkey	Kaya	10
5	(Philippines) Emelio Caligdong	Philippine Air Force	7

== Awards ==
- Agility Award: (Philippines) Yanti Barsales (Philippine Air Force)
- Golden Gloves: (Philippines) Edmundo Mercado Jr. (Philippine Air Force)
- Golden Boot: (Philippines) Phil Younghusband (Loyola Meralco Sparks)
- Golden Ball: (Philippines) Yanti Barsales (Philippine Air Force)
