= 2014 United Football League =

Football league season in Philippines

The 2014 United Football League was the fifth season of the UFL since its establishment as a semi-professional league in 2009. The UFL League kicked off on Saturday, January 11 with 9 teams in Division I and 12 teams in Division II.

Stallion was the defending champion, having won the Division 1 of the 2013 United Football League season.

Global outclassed Pachanga Diliman 7-2 on 12 June 2014 to win the 2014 United Football League title with three games to spare.

== Teams ==
The relegated Philippine Air Force from 2013 UFL Division 1 was replaced by Team Socceroo as the champion of 2013 UFL Division 2. The Manila Nomads voluntarily stepped down from Division I and played in Division II for this season citing its inability to comply with Division I's Foreigner Cap rule, which dictates that there should be a minimum of six Filipino players on the pitch at all times. Manila Jeepney and Ceres made their debuts i the league's Division II. In this season, the Division I played a triple round-robin system, increasing games from 18 to 24.

== Division 1 ==
United Football League Division 1
- Season: 2014
- Champions: Global
- Relegated: Pasargad
- Matches: 108
- Goals: 427 (3.95 per match)
- Top goalscorer: (Philippines) Mark Hartmann (27 Goals)
- Highest scoring: Philippine Army 1–9 Global; Kaya 9-1 Philippine Army; Global 9-1 Philippine Army
- Longest winning run: 8 games Global
- Longest unbeaten run: 14 games Global
- Longest winless run: 16 games Pasargad
- Longest losing run: 9 games Philippine Army

=== Clubs ===
Club	Head coach	Captain	Kit manufacturer	Shirt sponsor
Global	(Scotland) Leigh Manson	(Philippines) Patrick Deyto	AtletA	Kia
Green Archers United	(Philippines) Rodolfo Alicante	(Philippines) Christian Pasilan	LGR Athletic	Globe Telecom
Kaya	(Australia) David Perkovic	(Philippines) Alexander Borromeo	LGR Athletic	LBC Express
Loyola Meralco Sparks	(Philippines) Vincent Santos	(Philippines) Tomas Trigo	LGR Athletic	Meralco
Pachanga Diliman	(Philippines) Noel Marcaida	(Italy) Davide Cortina	Umbro	PLDT Home Fibr and Petron
Pasargad	(Philippines) Mike Agbayani	(Philippines) Jay Torres	LGR Athletic	
Philippine Army GTI	(Philippines) Ricky Cain	(Philippines) Roel Gener		Artificial Turf Sejung
Stallion FC	(Philippines) Ernie Nierras	(Philippines) Reuben Doctora Jr.	Mizuno	Gilligan's
Team Socceroo	(Philippines) Franklin Cacacho	(South Korea) Lee Jeong Woo	LGR Athletic	Vcargo Worldwide

=== Managerial changes ===
Team	Outgoing head coach	Manner of departure	Incoming head coach
Global	(Scotland) Brian Reid	Resigned	(Scotland) Leigh Manson
Pasargad	(Iran) Esmaeil Sedigh (Ghana) Ayi Aryee Nii	Mutual Consent; Resigned	(Ghana) Ayi Aryee Nii (Philippines) Mike Agbayani
Team Socceroo	(Philippines) Nolan Manito	Mutual Consent	(Philippines) Franklin Cacacho
Philippine Army GTI	(Philippines) Patricio Bumidang	Mutual Consent	(Philippines) Ricky Cain

=== Venues ===
Stadium	Location
Emperador Stadium	Taguig

=== League table ===
Pos	Team	Pld	W	D	L	GF	GA	GD	Pts	Qualification or relegation
1	Global (C)	24	20	2	2	112	20	+92	62	Qualification to the 2015 AFC Cup Group stage
2	Loyola	24	15	4	5	65	29	+36	49	
3	Kaya	24	14	4	6	64	28	+36	46	
4	Stallion	24	10	8	6	42	37	+5	38	
5	Green Archers United	24	10	7	7	38	38	0	37	
6	Pachanga Diliman	24	8	6	10	36	39	−3	30	
7	Philippine Army	24	5	2	17	25	77	−52	17	
8	Team Socceroo	24	4	4	16	31	85	−54	16	
9	Pasargad (R)	24	2	3	19	14	74	−60	9	Relegation to the 2015 UFL Division 2

Updated to match(es) played on 26 June 2014. Source: rsssf.com, soccerway.com
Rules for classification: 1) Points; 2) Goal Difference; 3) Goals Scored
(C) Champions; (R) Relegated

=== Results ===
==== Matchday 1-16 ====
Home \ Away	GLO	GAU	KAY	LOY	PAC	PSG	PA	STA	SOC
Global		0–0	0–1	3–2	4–1	7–0	9–1	5–1	9–0
Green Archers United	0–4		0–3	2–1	0–1	3–1	4–2	2–2	7–1
Kaya	1–2	3–0		0–0	1–1	3–1	9–1	0–0	4–2
Loyola	4–0	3–0	1–3		2–1	5–0	3–1	1–1	3–3
Pachanga Diliman	0–3	0–0	1–2	1–4		1–2	0–2	1–0	2–2
Pasargad	1–3	1–1	0–9	0–4	0–1		1–2	0–5	0–1
Philippine Army	1–9	2–2	0–2	1–5	0–0	2–0		0–2	2–1
Stallion	3–3	4–1	1–0	1–3	1–1	2–0	3–0		3–4
Team Socceroo	0–9	1–2	1–7	0–3	0–2	1–1	0–4	1–1	

Updated to match(es) played on April 15, 2014, 23:00. Source: United Football League (Philippines) soccerway
Legend: Blue = home team win; Yellow = draw; Red = away team win.

==== Matchday 17-24 ====
Home \ Away	GLO	GAU	KAY	LOY	PAC	PSG	PA	STA	SOC
Global		3–0			7–2			9–0	7–0
Green Archers United			2–0		1–1			1–4	1–0
Kaya	0–3			2–3		3–0	5–1		
Loyola	1–2	1–1			3–2				3–1
Pachanga Diliman			1–2			4–1	3–1	3–1	
Pasargad	1–4	1–2		0–5					2–6
Philippine Army	0–7	0–3		1–4		0–1			
Stallion			0–0	3–1		0–0	2–1		
Team Socceroo			4–5		0–6		2–0	0–2	

Updated to match(es) played on June 26, 2014, 23:00. Source: United Football League (Philippines) soccerway
Legend: Blue = home team win; Yellow = draw; Red = away team win.

=== Top goalscorers ===
Correct as of 23:00, June 24, 2014
Source: UFL Phil

Rank	Player	Club	Goals
1	(Philippines) Mark Hartmann	Global	27
2	(Iran) Milad Behgandom	Global	19
2	(Sudan) Izzeldin El Habbib	Global	19
4	(Philippines) Phil Younghusband	Loyola	16
5	(Senegal) Robert Lopez Mendy	Green Archers United	15
6	(Philippines) OJ Porteria	Kaya	14
7	(South Korea) Jeong Woo Lee	Team Socceroo	13
8	(Philippines) Nate Burkey	Pachanga Diliman	12
8	(Philippines) Freddy Gonzalez	Loyola	12
10	(South Korea) Joo Young Lee	Loyola	8

=== Own goals ===
Rank	Player	For	Club	Own Goal
1	(Philippines) Andrew Liauw	Stallion	Kaya	1
2	(Philippines) Ronnie Aguisanda	Stallion	Green Archers United	1
3	Stanley Ankrah	Global	Team Socceroo	1

=== Hat-tricks ===
Player	For	Against	Result	Date
(Nigeria) Emmanuel Mbata	Kaya	Team Socceroo	7–1	23 January 2014
(Philippines) Jeffrey Christiaens	Global	Philippine Army	9–1	1 February 2014
(Philippines) Christian Pasilan	Green Archers United	Team Socceroo	7–1	4 February 2014
(Philippines) Mark Hartmann	Global	Team Socceroo	9–0 ^{‡}	11 February 2014
(Philippines) OJ Porteria	Kaya	Philippine Army	9–1	13 February 2014
(United States) Diego Barrera	Team Socceroo	Stallion	4-3	13 March 2014
(Philippines) Mark Hartmann	Global	Team Socceroo	9-0^{‡}	20 March 2014
(Iran) Milad Behgandom	Global	Pasargad	7-0	29 March 2014
(Philippines) Freddy Gonzalez	Loyola	Philippine Army	4-1	5 April 2014
(South Korea) Jeong Woo Lee	Team Socceroo	Pasargad	6-2	11 May 2014
(Sudan) Izzeldin El Habbib	Global	Team Socceroo	7-0	14 June 2014
(Sudan) Izzeldin El Habbib	Global	Stallion	9-0	26 June 2014

- ^{‡} Player scored more than three goals

== Division 2 ==
United Football League Division 2
- Season: 2014
- Champions: Ceres
- Promoted: Ceres; Manila Jeepney
- Matches: 132
- Goals: 583 (4.42 per match)
- Top goalscorer: (South Korea) Jin Ho Kim (32 Goals)
- Highest scoring: Philippine Navy 3–10 Ceres
- Longest winning run: 7 games Manila Jeepney; Ceres
- Longest unbeaten run: 19 games Ceres
- Longest winless run: 21 games Cimarron
- Longest losing run: 11 games Cimarron

=== Clubs ===
Club	Head coach	Team captain	Kit manufacturer	Shirt sponsor
Agila	(Philippines) Ramon Vicente Roxas	(Nigeria) Olayemi Bakare	LGR Athletic	
Ceres	(Philippines) Ali Go	(Philippines) Jason Cordova	Adidas	Ceres Liner
Cimarron	(Philippines) Stephen Permanes	(Cameroon) Eric Yosse	Umbro	KMC MAG Group
Dolphins United	(Philippines) Ravelo Saluria	(Philippines) Jeremiah James Clemente	Botak	Cherifer and SiKLO Pilipinas
Forza	(Philippines) Jun Mark Saraga	(Philippines) Allan Auman	LGR Athletic	Orient Freight
Laos	(Iran) Mehdi Soltani	(Philippines) Rolly Lear	LGR Athletic	
Manila All-Japan	(Japan) Shinichiro Maeno	(Japan) Yuki Tanaka	LGR Athletic	JK Mart
Manila Jeepney	(Philippines) Kale Alvarez	(Philippines) Alvin Valeroso	LGR Athletic	Cord Epoxy
Manila Nomads	(Scotland) Alasdair Thomson	(Netherlands) Randy Musters	AtletA	
Philippine Air Force	(Philippines) Edzel Bracamonte	(Philippines) Ian Araneta	LGR Athletic	Philippine Air Force
Philippine Navy	(Philippines) Narciso Rosima	(Philippines) Jose Alfie Caminos	LGR Atlethic .	
Union Internacional Manila	(Philippines) Dan Padernal	(Spain) Ivan Meilan	Rudy Project	

=== Managerial changes ===
Team	Outgoing head coach	Manner of departure	Incoming head coach
Dolphins United	(Philippines) Greg Calawod	Mutual Consent	(Philippines) Ravelo Saluria
Forza	(Malaysia) Azlan Nasir	Mutual Consent	(Philippines) Jun Mark Saraga
Laos	(Philippines) Rolando Pinero	Mutual Consent	(Iran) Mehdi Soltani
Manila Nomads	(Scotland) John Jofre	Resigned	(United States) Alasdair Thomson
Union Internacional Manila	(Germany) Jorge Muller	Mutual Consent	(Philippines) Dan Padernal
Agila	(Philippines) John Paul Mérida	Mutual Consent	(Philippines) Ramon Vicente Roxas

=== Venues ===
Stadium	Location
Emperador Stadium	Taguig
Nomads Field	Parañaque

=== League table ===
Pos	Team	Pld	W	D	L	GF	GA	GD	Pts	Qualification or relegation
1	Ceres (Note: Ceres qualified to the 2015 AFC Cup Play-off round by winning the 2014 UFL FA League Cup.) (C, P)	22	18	3	1	93	18	+75	57	Qualification to the 2015 AFC Cup Playoff round Promotion to the 2015 UFL Division 1
2	Manila Jeepney (P)	22	16	1	5	70	27	+43	49	Qualification to the 2015 UFL Division 1
3	Philippine Air Force	22	14	2	6	53	22	+31	44	
4	Laos	22	12	3	7	42	27	+15	39	
5	Manila All-Japan	22	12	2	8	53	37	+16	38	
6	Forza	22	11	0	11	57	41	+16	33	
7	Manila Nomads (Note: Manila Nomads voluntarily stepped down from Division 1 and will play in Division 2 for this season citing its inability to comply with Division 1's Foreigner Cap rule, which dictates that there should be a minimum of six Filipino players on the pitch at all times.)	22	9	4	9	48	42	+6	31	
8	Union Internacional Manila	22	9	1	12	48	52	−4	28	
9	Agila	22	8	2	12	40	46	−6	26	
10	Philippine Navy	22	6	4	12	38	71	−33	22	
11	Dolphins United	22	4	1	17	23	98	−75	13	
12	Cimarron	22	1	1	20	18	102	−84	4	

Updated to match(es) played on 26 June 2014. Source: rsssf.com
Rules for classification: 1) Points; 2) Goal Difference; 3) Goals Scored
(C) Champions; (P) Promoted

=== Results ===
Home \ Away	AGI	CER	CIM	DOL	FOR	LAO	AJP	MJP	NOM	PAF	PN	UIM
Agila		1–3	2–0	5–1	1–2	1–4	3–2	0–1	2–0	0–1	2–3	3–5
Ceres	5–0		5–1	9–2	4–1	0–1	5–0	2–1	6–0	1–1	4–0	4–2
Cimarron	0–3	0–4		1–3	1–8	1–3	1–5	0–6	3–6	0–7	3–3	3–2
Dolphins United	1–4	1–9	4–2		2–1	0–2	0–3	1–7	0–5	2–4	1–1	0–6
Forza	1–2	2–6	10–0	3–0		1–2	1–2	1–2	5–2	1–4	0–1	3–2
Laos	1–0	0–0	6–0	4–1	0–3		1–1	0–1	0–1	1–2	5–5	2–0
Manila All-Japan	1–4	0–2	8–0	3–0	2–1	3–1		0–4	3–2	2–1	2–3	3–0
Manila Jeepney	3–1	0–5	3–0	10–1	0–3	1–2	3–1		3–2	2–0	3–2	2–3
Manila Nomads	4–4	0–0	6–0	5–0	1–2	2–0	2–2	0–3		1–3	2–1	0–1
Philippine Air Force	3–0	1–2	1–0	5–0	5–2	0–2	2–1	1–1	1–2		4–0	1–0
Philippine Navy	2–0	3–10	4–1	2–3	0–3	0–2	1–6	1–8	2–2	0–6		3–0
Union Internacional Manila	2–2	1–6	3–1	7–0	2–3	4–3	0–3	1–6	1–3	2–0	4–1	

Updated to match(es) played on June 26, 2014, 23:00. Source: United Football League (Philippines)
Legend: Blue = home team win; Yellow = draw; Red = away team win.

=== Top goalscorers ===
Correct as of 23:00, June 24, 2014
Source: UFL Phil

Rank	Player	Club	Goals
1	(South Korea) Jin Ho Kim	Ceres	32
2	(Philippines) Ian Araneta	Philippine Air Force	21
3	(Liberia) Jangobah Johnson	Forza	18
3	(Nigeria) Olayemi Bakare	Agila	18
5	(Ivory Coast) N'gnan Koffi Desmos Kouassi	Manila Jeepney	15
6	Abou Toure	Laos	12
6	(Japan) Chichiro Noda	Manila All-Japan	12
6	Jamal Lord	Manila Nomads/Union Internacional Manila	12
9	(Japan) Eiji Sugikasi	Manila All-Japan	11
9	(Japan) Genki Nakamura	Manila All-Japan	11
9	(Ivory Coast) Mohamed Diallo	Philippine Navy	11

=== Own goals ===
Rank	Player	For	Club	Own Goal
1	(Philippines) Bern Calumpang	Manila Jeepney	Philippine Navy	1
2	(Japan) Tatsuya Nakamura	Forza	Manila All-Japan	1
3	(Philippines) Romnick Echin	Ceres	Dolphins United	1
4	(Nigeria) Dimeji Tunde	Manila Nomads	Agila	1
5	(Ivory Coast) Dibi Pascal	Agila	Forza	1

=== Hat-tricks ===
Player	For	Against	Result	Date
(Ivory Coast) Koffi Desmos Arthur Kouassi N Gnan	Manila Jeepney	Philippine Navy	7–1 ^{‡}	18 January 2014
(France) Loic Toullec	Manila Nomads	Dolphins United	5–0 ^{‡}	19 January 2014
(South Korea) Jin Ho Kim	Ceres	Dolphins United	9–2	8 February 2014
(Japan) Eiji Sugikasi	Manila All-Japan	Cimarron	8–0 ^{‡}	8 February 2014
(Iran) Shayan Jafari	Union Internacional Manila	Laos	4–3	16 February 2014
(South Korea) Jin Ho Kim	Ceres	Union Internacional Manila	4–2	27 February 2014
(Liberia) Jangobah Johnson	Forza	Cimarron	10–0	2 March 2014
(Philippines) Arvin Gaspe	Forza	Cimarron	10–0	2 March 2014
(Philippines) Patrick Reichelt	Ceres	Forza	6–2	9 March 2014
(Ivory Coast) Koffi Desmos Arthur Kouassi N Gnan	Manila Jeepney	Union Internacional Manila	6–1	27 April 2014
(Nigeria) Olayemi Bakare	Agila	Manila Nomads	4–4	27 April 2014
Abou Toure	Laos	Philippine Navy	5–5 ^{‡}	4 May 2014
(South Korea) Jin Ho Kim	Ceres	Dolphins United	9–1	14 May 2014
(Ivory Coast) Oladipo Okunaiya	Ceres	Dolphins United	9–1	14 May 2014
(South Korea) Jin Ho Kim	Ceres	Agila	5–0	17 May 2014
(Philippines) Ian Macaspac	Forza	Cimarron	8–1	25 May 2014
(Liberia) Jangobah Johnson	Forza	Cimarron	8–1^{‡}	25 May 2014
(United States) Sean Stewart Illif	Manila Jeepney	Dolphins United	10-1	1 June 2014
(Philippines) Mahmoud Ali	Union Internacional Manila	Agila	5-3	8 June 2014
(South Korea) Jin Ho Kim	Ceres	Forza	4–1	14 June 2014

- ^{‡} Player scored more than three goals

== Season awards ==
=== Team awards ===
The following teams are awarded by the United Football League in the ceremony.

Division 1
Club	Award
Global	Champions
Loyola	1st-Runner Up
Global	Fair Play Award

Division 2
Club	Award
Ceres	Champions
Manila All-Japan	Fair Play Award

=== Individual awards ===
The following players are awarded by the United Football League Committee in the ceremony.

Division 1
Player	Club	Award
(Philippines) Jason de Jong	Global	Golden Ball
(Philippines) Mark Hartmann	Global	Golden Boot (27 goals)
(Ivory Coast) Roland Sadia	Global	Best Goalkeeper

Division 2
Player	Club	Award
(South Korea) Jin Ho Kim	Ceres	Golden Boot (32 goals)
(Philippines) Louie Michael Casas	Ceres	Best Goalkeeper
