= Manila 10s =

- Sport: Rugby Tens
- Founded: 1989; 37 years ago
- No. of teams: 36
- Country: Philippines
- Venues: Parañaque, Manila
- Website: http://www.manila10s.com

The Manila 10s is an annual men's rugby union tournament featuring a variant of rugby union popular in Southeast Asia called Rugby tens organized annually by Nomad Sports Club in Parañaque, Manila. The tournament is held one week before Hong Kong Sevens every year, allowing clubs from around the world to participate in the tournament prior to watching Hong Kong Sevens. Manila 10s features 4 divisions of varying skill levels (Cup, Plate, Bowl, and Shield) as well as a veteran's division for teams featuring only players over-35.

While the tournament is technically an amateur tournament the cup division often features ex-professional or internationally capped players such as former Welsh Captain Colin Charvis, former Australian Captain Jeremy Paul, world cup winner Joel Stransky and former British Lion John Bentley, featuring as 'guest' players for the tournament. The oldest player in the Manila 10's was 66 year old Don Anderson, playing for the Extinct Volcanoes in the 2019 tournament. The tournament draws most of the major amateur clubs in Asia such as the Shanghai Hairy Crabs, Seoul Survivors, Tokyo Gaijin, Taipei Baboons, and Hong Kong Football Club as well as teams from further abroad such as British Royal Gurkha Rifles Battalion's 'The Flying Kukris' rugby football club, who have been regular participants in the tournament since its creation.

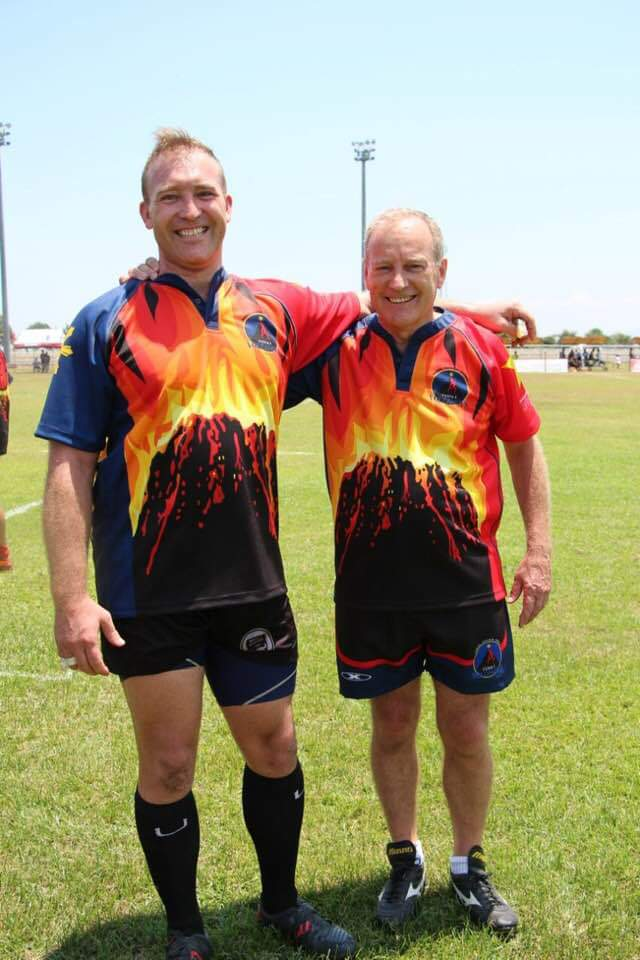
Don Anderson, oldest player to play in the Manila 10s

The 2011 cup division was won by JML Welsh Warriors, an inaugural entry into the competition, who featured former Welsh Captain and British Lions player Colin Charvis as their guest player.

== History ==
The Manila 10s was the first-ever rugby tournament held in the Philippines, and remains the premier rugby tournament in the country. The tournament started in 1989 as a way for the local, and then only, rugby club in the country, Manila Nomads to play rugby at a competitive level without having to tour regularly. The first tournament featured five teams playing in a one-day tournament but the popularity of the tournament quickly grew the competition to 16 teams playing across two days. By 2006 the tournament had reached its current numbers of 32 teams across five divisions, playing 76 games over two days.
