= Freddy Gonzalez (Filipino footballer) =

Filipino footballer (born 1978)

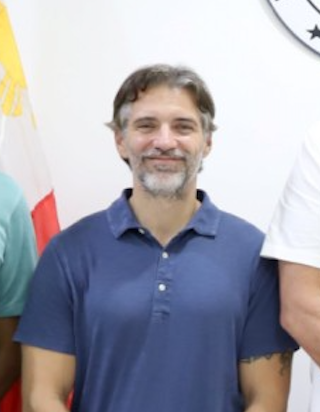
- Gonzalez in 2024

Personal information
- Full name: Alfredo Fernando Razón González
- Date of birth: January 10, 1978 (age 48)
- Place of birth: Parañaque, Philippines
- Position: Forward

Youth career
- 1998–1999: Portland Pilots

Senior career*
Years	Team	Apps	(Gls)
2000–2003	Kaya	45	(16)
2003	Ngân Hàng Đông Á	15	(2)
2004–2012	Pachanga Diliman	127	(51)
2013–2015	Loyola Meralco Sparks	42	(5)

International career
1997–2002	Philippines		(4)

Managerial career
- 2024–2025: Philippines (general manager (Note: General manager role. The role of the head coach is a separate position.))
- * Club domestic league appearances and goals as of 22:30, February 28, 2015 (UTC)

Alfredo Fernando Razón "Freddy" González (born January 10, 1978) is a Filipino former football player and administrator. He was the senior national teams director of the Philippine Football Federation and team manager of the Philippines national team from 2024 to 2025.

== Early years ==
Gonzalez's mother, Terry Razón, enrolled him to Tomas Lozano's Makati Football School (MFS) at age six. He later became the high school football star of Colegio de San Agustin. Gonzalez earned himself a soccer scholarship to the University of Portland, then considered one of the most professionally run (football wise) and well coached university teams in the United States. He stayed there for two years (1998/99) and honed his offensive skills playing for the Portland Pilots, the school soccer team.

== Club career ==
Learning the game from Spanish expatriate, Tomas Lozano, Gonzalez tried out with French club Calais RUFC coached by Ladislas Lozano, Tomas' brother, in 2000. Gonzalez trained in France for two weeks but was sidelined due to a torn hamstring. By the time he was recovered from injury, Lozano had already accepted a coaching job in Morocco.

Due to impressing team manager Nguyen Tien Huy of the V-League club Ngân hàng Đông Á (East Asian Commercial Bank FC) for his performances for the Philippines in the 2002 Tiger Cup in Jakarta, Gonzalez signed a one-year contract with the club in January 2003.

He also played for Komodo AS of Indonesia in 2004, being the only active Filipino professional player at that time. He was a part-time player in Europe and also played for Kaya in the Philippines. After his contract with the Vietnam professional club expired, Gonzalez retired from playing football, concentrating more into his interest in surfing and other business ventures such as bringing in the Brazilian flip flops brand Havaianas into the Philippines.

=== Return to football ===
Gonzalez played for Pachanga for the United Football League Division 2 in 2011.

In January 2012, for the first time in almost half a decade of retirement, he played for Pachanga. He scored in his debut in the 4-0 win against Agila in the opening match.

In the mid of June 2012, he led the team to the championship in Division 2 having 123 goals in the league. He won the Division 2's Golden Ball and Golden Boot Awards together with teammate Kenneth Dolloso, which won the Best Goalkeeper Award.

==== Loyola ====
On January 7, 2013, Gonzales transferred to Loyola before the start of 2013 PFF–Smart National Championship knockout stage and UFL 4th season.

== International career ==
Gonzalez made his debut for the Philippine national team in the 1997 South East Asian Games. He then played in the then "ASEAN Tiger Cup," (now Suzuki Cup), in Vietnam in 1998. He has, since then, represented the country in South East Asian Games (particularly the 1999 SEA Games in Brunei), in the Tiger Cup, and in any other invitational and qualifying tournaments.

=== International goals ===
Scores and results list the Philippines' goal tally first.

#	Date	Venue	Opponent	Score	Result	Competition
1.	August 29, 1998	Thong Nhat Stadium, Ho Chi Minh City	Thailand	1–1	1–3	1998 Tiger Cup
2.	August 31, 1998	Thong Nhat Stadium, Ho Chi Minh City	Myanmar	1–1	2–5	1998 Tiger Cup
3.	August 31, 1998	Thong Nhat Stadium, Ho Chi Minh City	Myanmar	2–1	2–5	1998 Tiger Cup
4.	December 17, 2002	Gelora Bung Karno Stadium, Jakarta	Myanmar	1–6	1–6	2002 Tiger Cup

== Sports executive career ==
=== Football ===
Philippines national teams

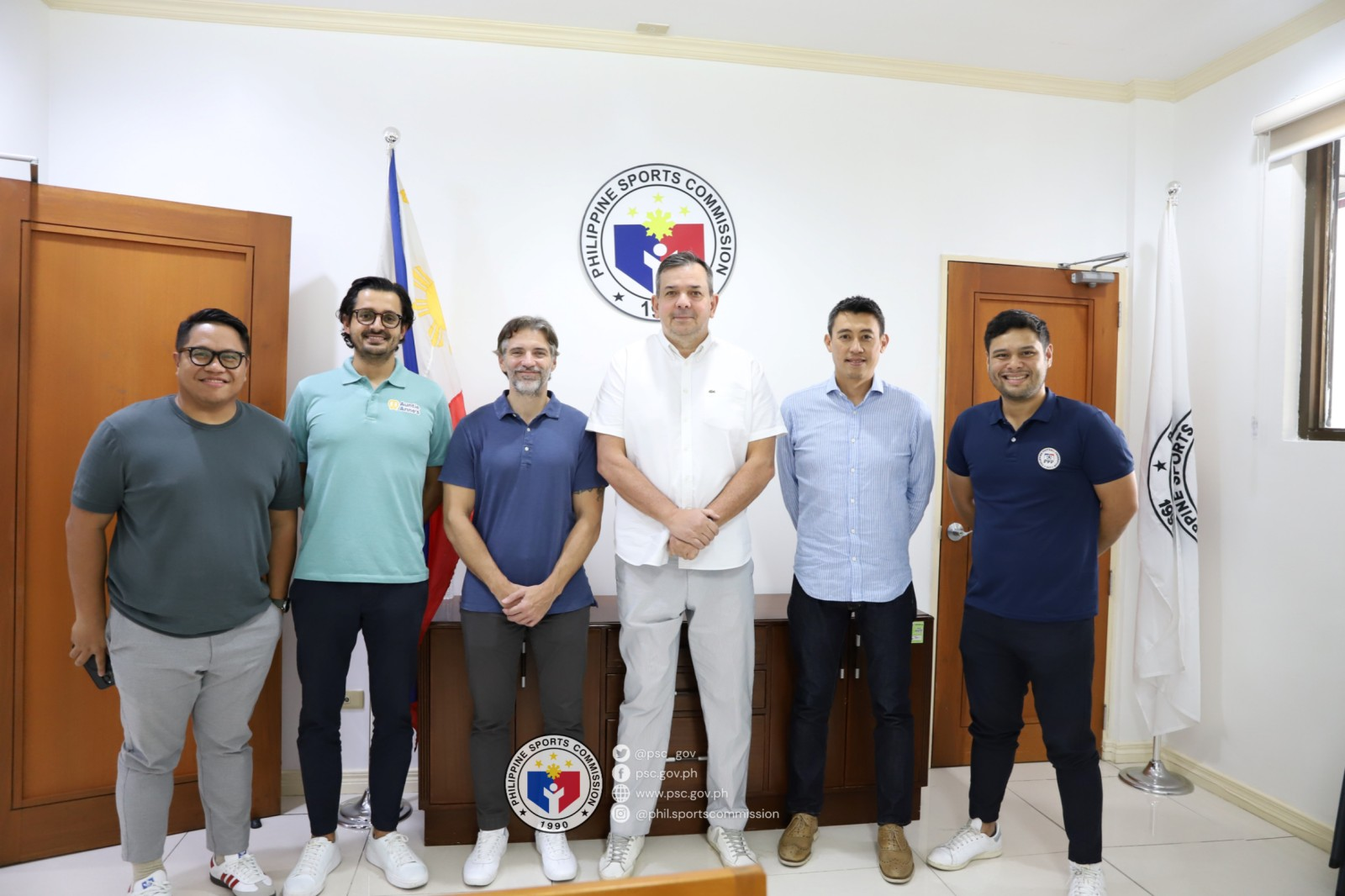
Gonzalez (third from the left) with Philippine Sports Commission chairperson Dickie Bachmann (adjacent) along with other PFF officials, January 2024

On January 11, 2024, it was announced that Gonzalez was appointed as the new national teams director of the Philippine Football Federation and team manager of the Philippines national teams, succeeding long-time national team manager Dan Palami. His tenure saw the national team return to the semifinals in the 2024 ASEAN Championship. He resigned in June 2025.

Finn Harps takeover

In 2026, Gonzalez proposed to acquire Finn Harps F.C., a supporter-owned club competing in the League of Ireland First Division. He pledged an initial investment of approximately €4 million towards improvements to Finn Park, the playing squad, staffing and training facilities, with plans to make the club fully professional.

On 3 November 2026, members of the Finn Harps Co-operative Society approved his proposed acquisition by 322 votes to two, with one abstention, following an initial vote in October. The transaction is expected to be completed in December 2026, subject to final arrangements.

== Personal life ==
Gonzalez graduated with an engineering degree. He is married to Regina Anne Marie Arcenas-Gonzalez, the managing director of Terry S.A., Inc. (the official distributor of Havaianas, David & Goliath, Pininho, and Dupe in the Philippines). With his varied interests, he opened "Aloha Board Sports," a shop that catered to skaters and surfers. He also owned a skate shop at Bonifacio Global City in Taguig called 5-O.

== Honors ==
=== Club ===
Pachanga

- UFL Division 2: 2012

Loyola

- UFL Cup: 2013
- PFF National Men's Club Championship: 2014–15

=== Individual ===
- UFL Division 2 Golden Ball: 2012
- UFL Division 2 Golden Boot: 2012
