= 2012 United Football League =

United Football League
- Season: 2012
- Champions: Division 1: Global (1st Title); Division 2: Pachanga (1st Title)
- Promoted: Pachanga (to Division 1)
- Relegated: Navy (to Division 2)
- AFC President's Cup: Global
- Matches: 222
- Goals: 962 (4.33 per match)
- Top goalscorer: Division 1: (Philippines) Phil Younghusband (23 goals); Division 2: (Philippines) Freddy Gonzales (34 goals)
- Highest scoring: Division 1: Loyola 14-0 Navy; Division 2: Pachanga 13–0 Sunken Garden United; Pachanga 13-0 Manila Lions
- Longest winning run: Division 1: 9 games Global FC
- Longest unbeaten run: Division 1: 5 Games; Stallion FC; Loyola
- Longest winless run: Division 1: 8 games Navy
- Longest losing run: Division 1: 6 games Navy

The 2012 United Football League was the third season of the UFL since its establishment as a semi-professional league in 2009. Global FC won their first Division 1 league title on goal difference against runners-up Kaya, after a 1–1 draw with third-placers Loyola Meralco Sparks on 26 June 2012. Pachanga won the Division 2 league title after being unbeaten in all its matches.

== Teams ==
Seven new clubs entered the league after the successful third season of UFL Cup. Manila Nomads, Stallion and Pasargad was promoted to 2012 UFL Division 1 after they reached the knockout stage of 2011 UFL Cup. The season opened on January 14, 2012, and ended on June 30, 2012.

== Clubs by division ==
=== Division 1 ===
Club	Head coach	Captain	Kit manufacturer	Shirt sponsor
Global	(Philippines) Edwin Cabalida	(Japan) Yu Hoshide	LGR Athletic	
Green Archers United	(Philippines) Rodolfo Alicante	(Philippines) Patrick Bacobo	LGR Athletic	Globe Telecom
Kaya	(Philippines) Michael Angelo "Kale" Alvarez	(Philippines) Aly Borromeo	Mizuno	LBC Express, Inc.
Loyola	(South Korea) Kim Chul-soo	(Philippines) James Younghusband	Mizuno	Meralco
Manila Nomads	(England) Michael Denison	(Netherlands) Randy Musters	Fila	Auction Manila
Pasargad	(Iran) Esmaeil Sedigh (Philippines) Joel Villarino	(Iran) Mansour Madadi	Planet Sports	
Philippine Air Force	(Philippines) Edzel Bracamonte	(Philippines) Yanti Barsales	Mizuno	Phoenix
Philippine Army	(Philippines) Patricio Bumidang Jr.	(Philippines) Roel Gener	Puma	Fritz & Macziol IBM
Philippine Navy	(Philippines) Marlon Maro	(Philippines) Loreto Kalalang	LGR Athletic	RedJuice
Stallion	(Philippines) Ernie Nierras (South Korea) Eun Hyung Pee	(Philippines) Ruben Doctora Jr.	Nike	Gilligan's Grill and Bar

=== Division 2 ===
Club	Head coach	Team captain	Kit manufacturer	Shirt sponsor
Agila	(Philippines) Carlo Jose Rodriguez	(Philippines) Mark Alvin Valeroso	Adidas	
Cebu Queen City United	(Philippines) Mario Ceniza	(Philippines) Jan Michael Flores	Adidas	Cebu Landmasters
Diliman	(Philippines) Salvador Alberto Salvacion	(Philippines) Jose Andoni Santos	Adidas	Antonov Vodka
Dolphins United	(Philippines) Greg Calawod	(Philippines) Romnick Echin		
Forza FC	(Malaysia) Azlan Nazir			
Laos FC	(Philippines) Ronald Patulin			
Manila All-Japan	(Japan) Ryo Kono			MGK
Manila Lions	(Philippines) Joel Alcala		Adidas	Meltique Beef
Pachanga	(Philippines) Norman Fegidero	(Philippines) Yves Ashime		
Sunken Garden United	(Philippines) Ryan Saranillo		Adidas	
Team Socceroo	(Philippines) Alfredo Estacion	(Philippines) Mike Reyes	Adidas	Regent Properties
Union FC	(Philippines) Rafael Rodriguez	Adidas	Rudy Project	

== Venues ==
=== Division 1 ===
Stadium	Location
Rizal Memorial Stadium	Manila
University of Makati Stadium	Makati
Nomads Sporting Club	Parañaque

=== Division 2 ===
Stadium	Location
Turf@BGC, Bonifacio Global City	Taguig
Alabang Country Club (ACC)	Muntinlupa

== League tables ==
=== Division 1 ===
Pos	Team	Pld	W	D	L	GF	GA	GD	Pts	Qualification or relegation
1	Global (C)	18	13	3	2	49	17	+32	42	Qualification to the 2013 AFC President's Cup
2	Kaya	18	13	3	2	30	17	+13	42	
3	Loyola	18	11	4	3	64	27	+37	37	
4	Stallion	18	8	5	5	37	20	+17	29	
5	Philippine Air Force	18	7	4	7	31	35	−4	25	
6	Pasargad	18	7	3	8	30	31	−1	24	
7	Manila Nomads	18	4	7	7	25	36	−11	19	
8	Green Archers United	18	3	5	10	30	34	−4	14	
9	Philippine Army	18	3	4	11	23	48	−25	13	
10	Philippine Navy (R)	18	1	2	15	15	69	−54	5	Relegation to the 2013 UFL Division 2

Updated to match(es) played on 30 June 2012. Source: rsssf.com, soccerway.com
Rules for classification: 1) Points; 2) Goal Difference; 3) Goals Scored
(C) Champions; (R) Relegated

=== Division 2 ===
Pos	Team	Pld	W	D	L	GF	GA	GD	Pts	Qualification or relegation
1	Pachanga (C, P)	22	21	1	0	123	8	+115	64	Promotion to the 2013 UFL Division 1
2	Diliman	22	18	2	2	82	25	+57	56	
3	Cebu Queen City United	22	14	5	3	83	29	+54	47	
4	Agila	22	12	1	9	48	49	−1	37	
5	Union Internacional Manila	22	8	5	9	46	60	−14	29	
6	Forza	22	9	2	11	50	71	−21	29	
7	Team Socceroo	22	8	4	10	51	61	−10	28	
8	Laos	22	8	3	11	36	45	−9	27	
9	Dolphins United	22	4	9	9	28	35	−7	21	
10	Manila All-Japan	22	5	4	13	30	60	−30	19	
11	Manila Lions (E)	22	3	2	17	17	77	−60	11	Snubbed from the 2013 UFL Division 2 (Note: Manila Lions and Sunken Garden United will be removed to give way for other teams a chance to compete for 2013 season, although they may still compete for the 2012 UFL Cup.)
12	Sunken Garden United (Note: Sunken Garden United's one of the loss was due to forfeiture due to insufficiency of players for the match.) (E)	22	3	0	19	35	109	−74	9	Snubbed from the 2013 UFL Division 2

Updated to match(es) played on 24 June 2012. Source: rsssf.com
Rules for classification: 1) Points; 2) Goal Difference; 3) Goals Scored
(C) Champions; (E) Eliminated; (P) Promoted

== Results ==
=== Division 1 ===
Home \ Away	GLO	GAU	KAY	LMS	NOM	PSG	PAF	PA	PN	STA
Global		1–0	1–1	1–1	1–1	4–0	5–3	1–2	3–2	1–0
Green Archers United	0–1		0–2	2–3	1–2	1–1	0–1	3–1	5–0	1–4
Kaya	1–5	2–1		2–2	2–1	3–0	3–1	1–0	1–0	1–1
Loyola	4–3	3–2	2–0		5–0	3–4	3–3	4–0	14–0	3–0
Manila Nomads	1–5	1–1	1–3	2–2		0–1	0–3	1–1	1–0	2–2
PSG	0–2	1–1	1–2	0–1	2–3		3–2	6–3	1–2	1–0
Philippine Air Force	0–4	1–1	0–1	2–1	3–2	2–0		2–2	2–1	1–4
Philippine Army	0–3	2–7	0–2	1–2	1–4	2–3	2–2		3–2	0–0
Philippine Navy	0–5	2–2	1–2	1–10	1–1	0–6	1–2	2–3		0–6
Stallion	1–3	5–2	0–1	4–1	2–2	0–0	2–1	3–0	2–0	

Updated to match(es) played on 20:20, 30 June 2012. Source: United Football League (Philippines)
Legend: Blue = home team win; Yellow = draw; Red = away team win.

=== Division 2 ===
Home \ Away	AGI	CQC	CIM	DOL	FOR	LAO	AJP	LIO	PAC	SGU	SOC	UIM
Agila		0–0	4–9	0–1	4–3	2–1	2–1	3–0	0–4	8–2	5–0	1–6
Cebu Queen City United	1–2		4–1	0–0	8–2	6–1	5–2	4–4	0–4	3–2	6–1	4–1
Cimarron	4–1	1–1		2–1	5–0	3–1	10–0	5–0	2–2	5–1	3–2	3–1
Dolphins United	2–0	1–5	0–2		2–4	0–2	0–0	1–1	2–3	0–1	3–3	2–2
Forza	4–1	1–6	0–2	4–3		0–2	1–1	3–0	0–3	5–4	6–1	1–3
Laos	1–3	0–2	1–6	1–1	3–3		0–1	2–1	1–4	3–1	0–1	2–1
Manila All-Japan	1–3	1–1	0–1	2–2	9–6	2–0		2–0	0–7	1–5	1–2	2–3
Manila Lions	0–1	0–7	0–6	0–2	1–2	1–5	1–0		0–2	1–3	1–7	3–1
Pachanga Diliman	4–0	1–0	2–1	1–0	8–1	4–0	7–0	13–0		13–0	8–0	8–0
Sunken Garden United	3–5	0–12	1–2	1–4	1–2	2–4	0–3 (Note: Manila All-Japan declared as winner by default after Sunken Garden United lack players to play. According to the UFL official Facebook page, only seven players arrived.)	1–3	0–13		1–5	3–7
Team Socceroo	1–3	3–4	2–4	1–1	0–1	0–0	3–1	5–1	0–8	6–2		2–2
Union Internacional Manila	1–0	4–4	1–5	0–0	4–1	1–6	1–0	2–2	1–4	4–1	0–6	

Updated to match(es) played on 23:20 24 June 2012. Source: United Football League (Philippines)
Legend: Blue = home team win; Yellow = draw; Red = away team win.

== Top goalscorers ==
=== Division 1 ===
Rank	Player	Club	Goals
1	(Philippines) Phil Younghusband	Loyola	23
2	(Sudan) Izzeldin Elhabbib	Global	13
3	(Philippines) Mark Hartmann	Loyola	12
3	(Philippines) Tating Pasilan	Green Archers United	12
5	(Philippines) James Younghusband	Loyola	11
5	(Philippines) Ian Araneta	Philippine Air Force	11

=== Division 2 ===
Rank	Player	Club	Goals
1	(Philippines) Freddy Gonzales	Pachanga	34
2	(Ghana) Isaac Agyie	Forza	21
3	(Philippines) Dan Villarico	Cebu Queen City United	20
4	(Philippines) Ariel Zerrudo	Diliman	19
5	(Philippines) Romnick Jover	Sunken Garden United	18

Correct as of 20:30, 30 June 2012
Source: UFL Phil

== Season Awards ==
=== Team Awards ===
The following teams are awarded by the United Football League in the ceremony.

==== Division 1 ====
Club	Award
Global FC	Champions
Kaya FC	1st-Runner Up
Global FC	Fair Play Award

==== Division 2 ====
Club	Award
Pachanga FC	Champions
Manila All-Japan FC	Fair Play Award

=== Individual awards ===
The following players are awarded by the United Football League Committee in the ceremony.

==== Division 1 ====
Player	Club	Award
Carli de Murga	Global FC	Golden Ball
Phil Younghusband	Loyola Meralco Sparks FC	Golden Boot(23 goals)
Yu Hoshide	Global FC	Agility Award
Saba Garmaroudi	Kaya	Best Goalkeeper

==== Division 2 ====
Player	Club	Award
Freddy Gonzales	Pachanga FC	Golden Ball
Freddy Gonzales	Pachanga FC	Golden Boot
Kenneth Dolloso	Pachanga FC	Best Goalkeeper
