= Manila Nomads Sports Club =

Filipino multi-sport club

Manila Nomads
- Full name: Manila Nomads Sports Club 1914
- Nickname: The Nomads
- Short name: Manila Nomads; Nomads Sports Club; Nomads SC; Nomads
- Founded: 1914; 112 years ago
- Home ground: Paco Park, Manila (1914–1949); Pasay Road-EDSA, Makati (1950–1968); Merville, Parañaque (1969–2017); San Lazaro Leisure Park, Carmona (2017–2019); Carmona, Makati (present)
- Colours: White, Green, Black, Grey
- Chairman: Jena Fetalino

Uniforms
Home	Away

Manila Nomads Sports Club, also known as Nomads Sports Club, Nomads SC or simply Manila Nomads and Nomads, is a Filipino multi-sport club now based in Carmona, Makati, Philippines. For much of the club's history, its beginnings and roots were situated within the city of Manila at the Paco Park from 1914 to 1949 and around Metro Manila, with its former grounds in the metropolis located, once more, in Makati from 1950 to 1968 and at the Merville area in Parañaque from 1969 to 2017.

The Manila Nomads Sports Club is the oldest active multi-sport club in the Philippines starting its involvements in sports continuously since 1914 and is parent to a number of different departments including football, rugby sevens, cricket, tennis, squash, and lawn bowls. The sports club is mostly known for its activities in football and rugby.

Its men's football team, fielded for the first time in the same year of the club's foundation in 1914, is now the oldest and last selection of the teams that participated in the first National Championships, since it started in 1911. Nomads is also the third ever club to win the Philippines National Football Championship, as well in 1914. The team, however, last played in the now-defunct United Football League, the highest level of Philippine club football in which, in 2011, the Nomads football team won its second division after being the runner-up in 2010. Nomads SC also took part in the United Football League domestic cup and in the PFF National Men's Club Championship. The Nomads saw their last involvement in the league and cup in 2016, which were also their last edition, before seeing the launch of the new top-tier league. Despite that, the club is yet to participate in the Philippines Football League. The women's football team is also one of the section the club pays great attention to, as its team was active way before the PFF Women's League was organized. In 2010 their team, named Nomads StretchMarks, participated in a few tournaments which they were able to win some and also took part in the Weekend Women's Football League. The Nomads then organized a team that is now competing in the current top tier league and in the PFF Women's Cup. The sports club also feature youth teams, also thanks to the Philippines women's national football team and its win in the 2022 AFF Women's Championship, the results obtained in the Asian Cup and the first ever participation in the World Cup sparked more interest and engagement in the sport.

Rugby, like football is a staple for Nomads SC, as it is one of the main promoters of the sport. The club, thanks to its efforts, was one of the factors for the birth of the Philippine Rugby Football Union in 1998. The club host one of the oldest and most popular rugby 10s tournaments in Asia, the Manila 10s International Rugby Festival which, before the club was forced out, took place in their home in Merville, Parañaque. The tournament now is taking place in sports venues around Metro Manila. Nomads has its own team in rugby, for both men's and women's, called Manila Nomads Rugby Club and compete in both rugby 7s and rugby 15s. The club also boasts a number of representatives in the Philippine Volcanoes national team, the Philippine Residents XV, and the National Development Team (for Philippine Heritage players). The club's overall objective is to get more and more local players involved in the sport as it also has a development program called Nomads Youth Rugby Program .

Nomads' connection with the sport of cricket is also evident, as the first games date back during the years of the club's foundation. Like rugby, the club is also one of its major promoters and developers in the Philippines and when the Philippine Cricket Association was established in June 1999, it had its official base at the Nomads headquarters in Merville before the club moved out. Its team, the Nomads Cricket Team became a three-time National Cricket Champion in 2013.

== History ==
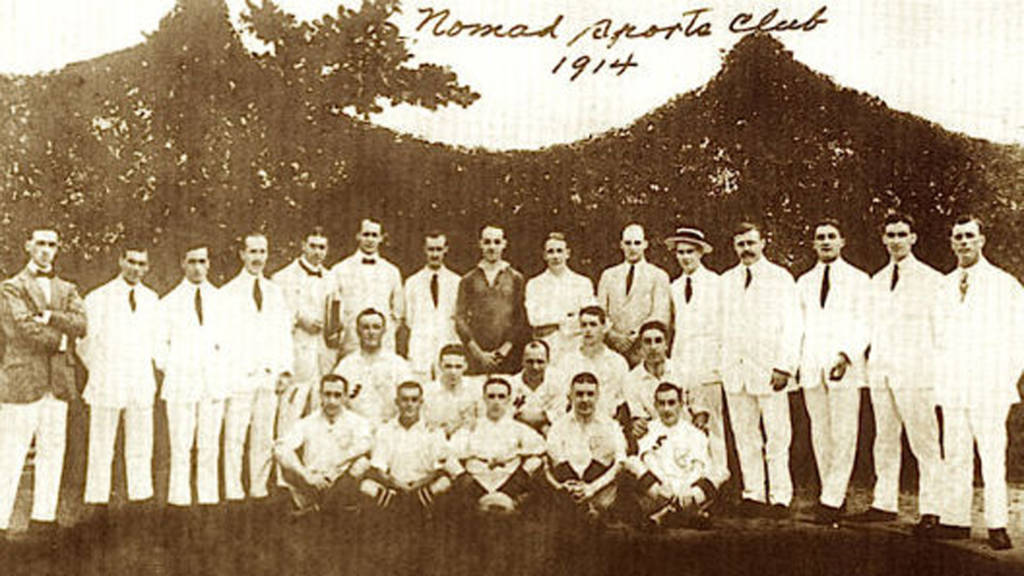
Group photo of the Nomad Sports Club members in the early 20th century

Manila Nomads Sports Club was founded in 1914 by members of the Manila Club which primarily was a club for Britons and the oldest existing club in the country. James Walker Cairns, who was born in Scotland in 1870 was the first president of the sports club and served the position from 1914 to 1934. The FIFA Book of Record, lists the football team of Manila Nomads as one of the first Philippine Football Champion, winning the local league in 1914, the same year of its foundation and pioneered football in the country. The initial site of the club was built near the Manila Club on the corner of Marquins de Comillas and Padre Faura next to the Paco Cemetery. World War II interrupted the activities of the club.

The facilities of the Manila Club were destroyed during the Liberation of Manila. After the war the Nomads used the grounds for their activities and were involved with the rebuilding of the Manila Club, which is now occupied by the Philippine Charity Sweepstakes Office. It was proposed for the Manila Club and Manila Nomads to be merged but did not push through with the plan after members decided on the matter during a general meeting of the Manila Club.

On 14 January 1949, the Nomads Sports Club was registered as a non-profit corporation in accordance to the Philippine law. In 1949/50, a new ground and clubhouse of the Nomads was constructed in Makati, near the corner of current Pasay Road and EDSA. In the 1960s, the club looked for another location after an offer to sell the property to the club was declined by the Board of Directors of the Nomads.

The sports club moved to Merville in 1969 on a land leased to them by Emilio Nery. The facility was improved upon with the addition of two tennis courts in 1977, a junior Olympic size swimming pool and changing room was added in 1981 as a result of a joint venture with the British School, the first and only lawn bowls green in the Philippines was added in 1988.

After the death of Emilio Nery, his heirs expressed interest to sell the land with Manila Nomads reportedly had the first right to purchase the property. The club has raised funds to purchase the Merville grounds but the land was sold to Multisphere Trading of businessman Kishore Hemlani who legally challenged Nomad's claim on the land and won forcing the club to move out of Merville.

In 2016, the forced closure of the Nomad's grounds was announced. The last event held in the venue was a rugby match at the 2016 SPI 15s league grand final between the Nomads and the Alabang Eagles Rugby Club where the latter won over the former, 24–16. By early 2017, the club has moved to the San Lazaro Leisure Park in Carmona, Cavite home to another historical institution, Manila Jockey Club. The two historical clubs partnered together and organized the annual Manila 10's International Rugby Tournament, which was supposed to be held in Parañaque before the Nomads were forced out. The club then returned to Makati, in Carmona where it established its sporting and recreation facility at the circuit site.

== Football ==
=== Men's football team ===
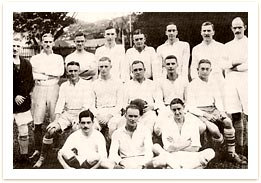
A team photo of some of the very first Nomads

The men's football team of Manila Nomads is the oldest section of the sports club, having participated in the first editions of the Philippines National Championships in the first decades of the 20th century and pioneered the sport alongside Manila Jockey Club (1900s), Manila Sporting Club (1906), Sandow Athletic Club (1906), Bohemian Sporting Club (1910) and Aurora Athletic Club (1910s).

==== Philippines National Championship ====
The first appearances of the Nomads SC football team date in 1914, as soon as the club was founded. It saw the debut of its football team in the Philippines National Championship also in the same year and was composed mostly by Britons and foreigners. Nomads made of that, not only for the club's foundation but because, it was already able to establish itself as a significant team in the country dethroningBohemian SC and became the third ever club to be crowned as "Filipino football champions" in Philippine history, after All Manila (1911) and Boheman (1912). The Nomads, however, were not able to repeat their feats in those early years but were able to bring and be joined in the team, Filipino legend, Virgilio Lobregat in the late 1920s.

==== United Football League ====
Manila Nomads was one of the founding members of the United Football League and played in both divisions since the league started as a semi-professional football league in 2009. The Nomads alongside the other founders inaugurated the season in the UFL Cup to determine which club would participate in which divisions.

Nomads started its new chapter in football in the second division of the UFL. The team finished second in the UFL Division 2 in 2010, behind Global, while in the 2010 UFL Cup Nomads was able to advance from the group stage but were stopped by Philippine Army FC. After coming up short in the previous season, the Nomads won the title in the 2011 season, finishing the season with 37 points in 14 games and were promoted to the UFL Division 1 along with Stallion FC and Pasargad FC. in the cup the Nomads topped their group and advanced to the quarter-finals before being stopped by Kaya FC.

In the 2012 season, Nomads returned to what was considered the top flight football competition in the Philippines after years of absence. The club, coached by Michael Denison ended the season in the 7th position of the table with 19 points in 18 games. The 2012 UFL Cup saw the Nomads placed in Group C alongside Loyola and Pachanga Diliman with each of them reaching 9 points in 4 games. Despite that, Nomads finished third by goal difference and didn't qualify to the knockout stage but instead, due to the format of the cup, qualified directly in the last 16 for the 2012–13 PFF National Men's Club Championship. The debut in that tournament saw the club losing to finalist Global with a score of 1–2. In the 2013 season, the club finished 8th in the table and survived relegation. The Nomads did not take part in neither of the cups, especially the 2013 UFL Cup in which they had to pull out for the new foreigners rule.

Nomads SC took part in the inaugural 2013 UFL Pre-season Cup, reaching the semifinals before losing to the eventual champions Loyola and, overall, obtaining promising results. However, before the start of the 2014 season, Manila Nomads chose to self-relegate to the second division, due to the 5-foreign player cap rule, being a team that consists mainly of expats. That season the club finished 7th and once again did not take part in any of the cups. The following year, they decided not to participate of the league tournament of the 2015 season to build a roster that would comply with the newly imposed regulation but participated in the 2015 UFL Cup. Nomads advanced to the last 16 following Global's disqualification and then lost against Kaya.

The UFL decided that for the next season there would be only one league. Nomads returned to the 2016 season and participated at the 2016 UFL Cup in which it was mandated that there would be no guest teams at the tournament and all participants had to enter the league competition. The club along with Agila and Pasargad withdrew in the second round of the league.

==== Home venue ====
Manila Nomads men's played its home games at the Nomads Field in Parañaque, which has a capacity of 3,000 spectators.

==== Records ====
Season	Division	Tms.	Pos.	PFF NMCC	UFL Cup	FA LC	FA Cup	UFL PSC
2009	Played the UFL Cup				Group Stage			
2010	2	8	2nd		Quarter-finals			
2011	2	8	1st	—	Quarter-finals			
2012	1	10	7th	Round of 16	Group Stage			
2013	1	10	8th	—	—			4th
2014	2	12	7th	—		—	—	
2015	Did Not Participate				Round of 16			
2016	1	12	8th		Group Stage			

Key

- Tms. = Number of teams
- Pos. = Position in league
- TBD = To be determined
- DNQ = Did not qualify

Note: Performances of the club indicated here was after the UFL created (as a semi-pro league) in 2009.

=== Honors ===
Type	Competition	Titles	Seasons
Domestic	Philippines National Championship	1	1914
Domestic	UFL Division 2	1^{S}	2011

- Record
- ^{S} Shared record

==== Other ====
- UFL Division 2
  - Runner-up: 2010

== Cricket ==
Cricket has been played in the Nomads since the club's inception. The Manila Nomads hosts the only grassed cricket-playing arena in Manila. The Philippines Cricket Association has its official base within the sports club's grounds.

== Other sports ==
Badminton, Tennis, Squash and Lawn Bowls are other sports accommodated by Manila Nomads.
