= Green Archers United F.C. =

Filipino association football club

Green Archers United
- Full name: Green Archers United Futbol Club
- Nicknames: The Archers; Green Archers
- Short name: GAU
- Founded: 1998; 28 years ago, as Alabang Grins F.C.
- Dissolved: 2020
- Ground: Aboitiz Pitch
- Capacity: 1,500
- League: United Football League and Philippines Football League
| Home colours | Away colours | Third colours |

Green Archers United Futbol Club, formerly known as Alabang Grins Futbol Club, was a Filipino professional association football club based in Lipa, Batangas, Philippines. The team last played in the 2019 season of the Philippines Football League, the top-level league in the Philippines. They have also participated in the United Football League.

It was founded in 1998 by football players from the De La Salle University, which are known as the "Green Archers" in the UAAP.

== History ==
=== 2012 UFL season ===
Green Archers United is one of the founding members of the United Football League and playing in Division 1 since the league started as semi-professional in 2009. In 2012 UFL season, they finished 8th in the table.

Green Archers United finished 4th in the 2012 UFL Cup. They were beaten by eventual champions Stallion (1–3) in the semi-finals and 3rd placed Loyola (1–4) in the 3rd place play-off.

=== 2013 PFF National Men's Club Championship ===
The Green Archers United qualified in the 2013 PFF National Men's Club Championship Round of 16 after they ranked in the Top 10 of 2012 UFL Cup. They finished 4th in 2013 PFF National Men's Club Championship after they were beaten by Kaya in the 3rd place play-offs.

=== Weekend Futbol League Elite ===
Green Archers United was among the teams that applied to participate in the inaugural season of the Philippines Football League (PFL) in 2017 but later decided to withdraw its application. The club decision was due to uncertainties in raising funds to pay for the leagues ₱4.5 million franchise fee and expressed readiness in joining if club finds the league's rules as consistent enough. Instead of playing in the PFL inaugural season, the club decided to play in the Weekend Futbol League Elite finishing as runners-up to Kaya FC-Makati's reserves in the 2017 season.

=== Philippines Football League ===
Green Archers United formally expressed interest to join the Philippine Premier League (PPL), the intended successor league of the Philippines Football League (PFL) in December 2018 Their only match in the short-lived PPL which only had one match day was a 0–3 loss to Kaya–Iloilo on April 27, 2019. The PPL folded when the Philippine Football Federation withdrew its sanction of the league's operators and decided to revive the PFL within the same year.

The club was among the seven teams to participate in the 2019 season of the revived PFL league. They decided to enter the league after withdrawing its plans to do the same for the inaugural season of the PFL in 2017. This is due to more lenient financial policies imposed in the 2019 season, which allowed freedom for clubs to sign in more sponsors than in previous iterations of the PFL. Green Archers United considered designating the Aboitiz Pitch in Lipa, Batangas, the PFF National Training Centre in Carmona, Cavite, and the Rizal Memorial Stadium as its home venue starting the 2019 PFL season. The Green Archers decided to set the Lipa facility as their home venue, with their 4–0 win over Philippine Air Force on August 4, 2019, as their first official home match.

Green Archers United decided not participate in 2020 season citing unsatisfactory media coverage of the PFL during the 2019 season. Amidst the COVID-19 pandemic, the team has disbanded.

== Kit manufacturers and shirt sponsors ==
| Period | Kit manufacturer | Shirt partner |
|---|---|---|
| 2009–10 | Unknown | Orient Freight International |
| 2010–11 | Comadore Sports and Leisure | Orient Freight International |
| 2011–15 | LGR | Globe Telecom^{1} Orient Freight, Mobil 1^{2} |
| 2015–16 | Mizuno | Globe Telecom^{1} Orient Freight International, Mobil 1^{2} |
| 2016–2017 | LGR | Globe Telecom^{1} Orient Freight International^{2} |
| 2019 | Cutz Apparel | Globe Telecom^{1} Orient Freight International^{2} |

- ^{1}Major shirt sponsor (names located at the front of the shirt).
- ^{2}Secondary sponsor (names mostly located at the back of the shirt).

== Records ==
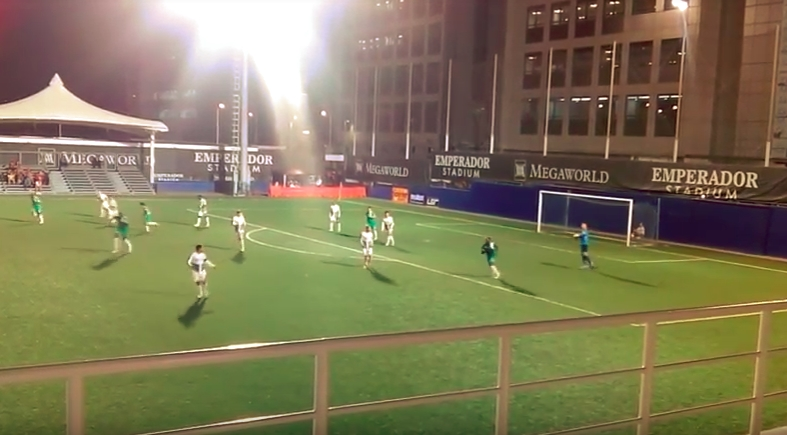
2014 United Football League match against Pasargad at the Emperador Stadium.

| Season | Division | Tms. | Pos. | National Cup | League Cup | Other Cups | International |
|---|---|---|---|---|---|---|---|
| 2009–10 | 1 | 8 | 7th | | Quarter-finals | | |
| 2010–11 | 1 | 7 | 6th | | Group stage | | |
| 2011–12 | 1 | 10 | 8th | DNQ | Quarter-finals | | |
| 2012–13 | 1 | 10 | 6th | Fourth | Fourth | Third | DNQ |
| 2013–14 | 1 | 9 | 5th | — | Third | Quarter-finals | — |
| 2014–15 | 1 | 10 | 6th | DNQ | Quarter-finals | Group stage | DNQ |
| 2016 | 1 | 12 | 7th | | Quarter-finals | | DNQ |
| 2019 | 1 | 7 | 4th | Group stage | | | — |

Key

- Tms. = Number of teams
- Pos. = Position in league
- TBD = To be determined
- DNQ = Did not qualify

Note: Performances of the club indicated here was after the UFL created (as a semi-pro league) in 2009.

== Head coaches ==
| Name | Nat | Period | Honors |
|---|---|---|---|
| Rodolfo Alicante | (Philippines) | 2011–2018 | UFL Cup Third 2013 |
| Joel Villarino | (Philippines) | 2019 | |

== Assistant coaches ==
| Name | Nat | Period |
|---|---|---|
| Luis Villabuena | (Philippines) | 2015-2018 |
| Riccardo Dattoli | (Italy) | 2019 |

== Honors ==
=== Domestic ===
==== League ====
- WFL Elite Futbol League
  - Champions (1): 2018
  - Runners-up (1): 2017

==== Cup ====
- UFL Cup
  - Third place (1): 2013
- UFL Pre-season Cup
  - Third place (1): 2013
