= Taipei Baboons =

Rugby team in Taipei, Taiwan

- Full name: Taipei Baboons R.F.C
- Founded: 1990; 36 years ago
- Location: Taipei, Taiwan

Official website
- www.facebook.com/groups/taipeibaboons/

The Taipei Baboons are a rugby union team based in Taipei, Taiwan.

== See also ==
- Rugby union in Taiwan
