= JPV Marikina F.C. =

JPV Marikina
- Crest (2017–2018)
- Full name: Japan Philippines Voltes Marikina Football Club
- Nickname: The Voltes
- Short name: JPV
- Founded: 2012
- Dissolved: 2018 (Note: As JPV Marikina. Manila All-Japan F.C. still exists as an amateur club.)
- Ground: Marikina Sports Complex
- Capacity: 15,000
- League: Philippines Football League
- 2018: 5th of 6
Home colours	Away colours

Japan Philippines Voltes Marikina Football Club, commonly known as JP Voltes Football Club, was an association football club in Metro Manila, Philippines. It competed in the Philippines Football League (PFL), the highest level of Philippine club football from 2017 to 2018 with the city of Marikina designated as its home.

The club is known as Manila All-Japan Football Club during its time in the United Football League until 2015. It was known as JP Voltes from 2015 to 2017 in the UFL.

The team consisted of Japanese and Filipino players. It is one of the founding members of the United Football League in 2009, where the team played in UFL Division 2 and later in the only division of the league following the merger of UFL Division 1 and 2 in 2016.

In the 2015 United Football League Division 2 season, the team achieved promotion to the United Football League First Division by winning the 2015 promotion/relegation play-off, allowing them to play in the Philippines' top flight for the first time in its history.

The name of JP Voltes FC was derived from the mecha anime series, Voltes 5 which was popular in the Philippines. Its name was also inspired by the word "Vortex." The club got registered as a corporation.

After its departure from the PFL in 2018, a Manila All-Japan team is still extant and competes in the Weekend Futbol League.

== History ==
JP Voltes' history can be traced as early as 1993, when a football team composed of Japanese players participated the 3rd Manila Mini Soccer World Cup, a seven-a-side tournament. From 1994 to 1997 The team participated in the next four editions of the tournament. The standard 11-a-side format was introduced in the 1997 tournament. In 1998, the Japanese football team along with a French team and the Manila Nomads Sports Club decided to participate at the E-League (Expat League) and on the next year the Japanese team registered with the E-League as the Manila All Japan FC.

=== United Football League ===
In 2000, the E-League became under the Philippine Football Federation and was renamed the United Football League (U-League). In 2009 the United Football League (UFL) was launched as a semiprofessional league. Manila All Japan joined inaugural season of the league. The club started from the league's second division. At the inaugural season there is no foreign player cap and the club fielded a Japanese-majority squad.

In 2013, the club began to accept more Filipino players since a foreign player cap was imposed by the UFL. As part of Manila All Japan's club to earn a place in UFL Division 1, in 2014 the club was split into two – MAJ FC and Manila All Japan FC, with the latter focusing on expatriate players. Manila All Japan FC, participated in the Weekend Football League while MAJ FC remained in the UFL. MAJ FC was renamed as JP Voltes in late 2015 and managed to secure a promotion after finishing second place and winning a playoff match. The UFL merges its two divisions and JP Voltes participated in the now single-division football league. They finished fourth.

=== Philippines Football League ===
JP Voltes was confirmed in December 2016 to be among the participating clubs in the inaugural season of the Philippines Football League. In March 2017, JP Voltes was renamed as JPV Marikina F.C. and also confirmed that the club will represent Marikina in the PFL inaugural season. Aside from Marikina, the club previously considered Baguio, Biñan and Iloilo City as a possible home venue.

During the whole 2017 season, the club played its "home" matches at the Biñan Football Stadium in Laguna, and Rizal Memorial Stadium in Manila, since the pitch of their designated home ground, the Marikina Sports Complex was undergoing repair to meet league standards. The finished fifth in the inaugural season missing the Final Series.

In the 2018 season, they started playing their home games at the Marikina Sports Complex. Their first home match at their designated home grounds was the 2–1 win over Global Cebu on 3 March 2018. Following the conclusion of the season, the club reportedly is dealing with an "uncertain future."

=== Weekend Futbol League ===
Currently, JP Voltes renamed back to Manila All-Japan and plays in the Weekend Futbol League for its 2019–2020 season.

== Youth ==
JPV-Malaya Football Club serves as the youth development arm of JPV Marikina. Malaya FC which was founded in March 2013 participates at the Youth Football League. As of November 2018, the youth club has around 180 active players of ages ranging from 6 to 16.

== Crest ==
The official club crest, the club then known as "Manila All-Japan" (2009–2015).

Club crest after the change from "Manila All-Japan" to "JP Voltes", 2015–2017.

== Records ==
Season	Division	Teams	League Position	PFL Cup	UFL Cup	League Cup
2009	—	—	—	—	Group stage	—
2010	2	8	7th	—	Group stage	—
2011	2	8	8th	—	Group stage	—
2012	2	12	10th	—	Play-off Stage	—
2013	2	10	8th	—	Quarter-final	—
2014	2	12	5th	—	—	Quarter-final
2015	2 (P)	7	2nd	—	Quarter-final	—
2016	1	12	4th	—	6th (Plate Runner-up)	—
2017	1	8	6th (Regular Season)	—	—	—
2017	1	8	DNQ (Final Series)	—	—	—
2018	1	6	5th	Group stage	—	—
2019-Present	—			—	—	—
