= Pasargad F.C. =

Pasargad
- Full name: Pasargad Football Club
- Nickname: PSG
- Founded: 1996; 30 years ago
Home colours	Away colours

The Pasargad Football Club is a Filipino football and futsal club. The team played in the former United Football League which was the highest level of club football in the Philippines.

== History ==
=== Foundation and early years ===
Pasargad F.C. started in 1996 when a group of football enthusiasts decided to form a team. Initially, the team consisted mostly of Iranians, a few Africans and some Filipinos that joined to play the game. The team eventually consisted of players from the national team and different collegiate teams with its core base of Iranian players.

Pasargad was named after the capital of former Persian emperor Cyrus the Great (that has been named a UNESCO World Heritage Site).

The club was originally part of inaugural Filipino Premier League in 2008. They finished fourth in the league table, however the league was discontinued after the first season.

On 16 October 2010, they joined 2010 UFL Cup where they finished third in group A and were eventually eliminated. They lost to Loyola in the plate finals (a ranking match for a spot in the UFL Division 1).

=== 2013–present ===
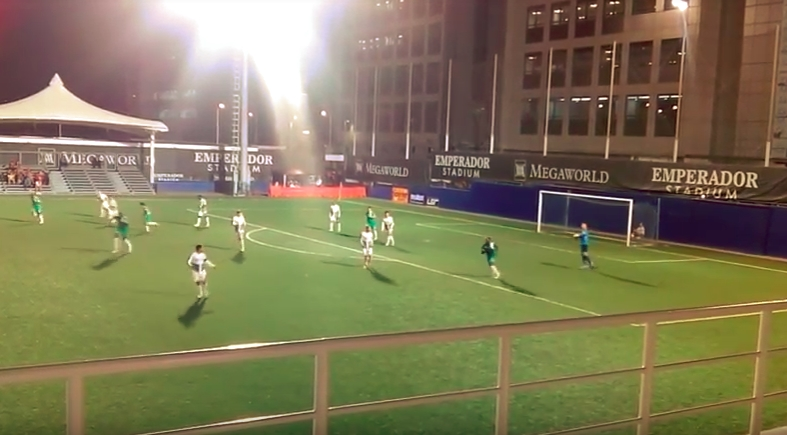
2014 United Football League match against Green Archers United at the Emperador Stadium.

The club made a good run in the 2013 PFF National Men's Club Championship and reached the finals. They lost to Ceres in a 1–0 scoreline.

In April 2013, Pasargad FC competed in the qualification round of 2013 AFC Futsal Club Championship as the Philippine Football Federation representative in the tournament.

In January 2014, Ayi Aryee Nii assumed as Pasargad's head coach, which was previously the job of club president Esmaeil Sedigh.

In March 2014, Ayi Aryee Nii was replaced by Mike Agbayani.

In 2016, Agbayani was replaced by former Kaya F.C. assistant coach Joel Villarino.

== Notable players ==
The following were notable players that played for Pasargad and have played for a national team.

- Misagh Bahadoran (Philippines)
- Yannick Tuason (Philippines)
- Ariel Zerrudo (Philippines)
- Arash Ostovari (Iran U17 and U20)

== Records ==
Season	Division	Tms.	Pos.	PFF NMCC	UFL Cup	AFC PC
Not part of the league yet					Group stage	—
2011	2	8	3rd (Prom)	—	Round of 16	—
2012	1	10	6th	—	Group stage	—
2013	1	10	7th	Runner-up	TBD	DNQ

Key

- Tms. = Number of teams
- Pos. = Position in league
- Prom = Promoted
- TBD = To be determined
- DNQ = Did not qualify

Note: Performances of the club indicated here was after the UFL created (as a semi-pro league) in 2009.

=== International club futsal ===
Season	Competition	Round		Club	Score
2013	AFC Futsal Club Championship qualification	ASEAN/East (Zone 2)	(China)	Shenzhen Nanling	2–10
2013	AFC Futsal Club Championship qualification	ASEAN/East (Zone 2)	(Thailand)	Chonburi Blue Wave	2–10
2013	AFC Futsal Club Championship qualification	ASEAN/East (Zone 2)	(Chinese Taipei)	Tainan City	0–4

== Honors ==
=== Football ===
- PFF National Men's Club Championship

- Runners-up (1): 2013

- Filipino Premier League

- Third Place (1): 2008

=== Futsal ===
- Philippine Futsal League

- Champions (2): 2011, 2012
