= Pachanga Diliman F.C. =

Pachanga Diliman
- Full name: Pachanga Diliman Football Club
- Nicknames: Red Phoenix; The Baby Boys
- Founded: 1998; 28 years ago, as Pachanga Football Club
- Dissolved: 2015; 11 years ago
- Chairman: John Gutierrez
- Head coach: See below
- League: UFL Division 1
- 2015: UFL Division 1, 8th
Home colors	Away colors

Pachanga Diliman Football Club was a Filipino association football club based in Diliman, Quezon City that played in the United Football League, the highest level of Philippine club football. It was founded in 1998 as Pachanga Football Club by then owner Alfredo Razon Gonzalez. In 2012, Pachanga was sold to the owners of Diliman Football Club, who then merged the two clubs.

== History ==
Founded in 1998, Pachanga is known for its participation in the 2011 PFF National Men's Club Championship where the club reached the semi-finals round of the competition. In the 2011 season, the club joined the 2011 UFL Cup where the club reached the quarter-finals before a disheartening 1-nil loss to Global F.C. They then entered the United Football League Division 2 as an expansion club.

The club successfully earned the promotion to the 2013 UFL Division 1 after they won against Agila F.C. 4–0.

=== Merger with Diliman F.C. ===
After the successful 2012 season which the Red Phoenix finished with no loss and one draw in 22 games, the club was sold by their owner to group associated with the Diliman FC. Alfredo Gonzalez cited reasons that it is a family decision to sell the club and since he was too busy with his work. The league announced that the club under new ownership will be named Pachanga Diliman Football Club.

=== 2013 UFL Season and Cup ===
In their first season in the United Football League Division 1 after gaining promotion the Red Phoenix finished in fifth place behind Kaya FC and ahead of Green Archers United with a total of 28 points. In the 2013 UFL Cup Pachanga Diliman FC managed to reach the finals of the competition, beating former champions Stallions FC, Air Force and Forza FC on their way, in order to set up a final match against the Loyola Meralco Sparks.

=== Withdrawal from the United Football League and dissolvement ===
After the 2015 season of the first division of the United Football League concluded. The club wordlessly announced their withdrawal from the upcoming 2016 United Football League season. The club later dissolved after their withdrawal.

== Coaches ==
- (Spain) Juan Cutillas
- (Philippines) Norman Fegidero (2011–2012)
- (Philippines) Salvador Salvacion (2012–2013)
- (Philippines) Noel Marcaida (2013–2014)
- (Japan) Yuki Matsuda (2014–2015)

== Records ==
Season	Division	Tms.	Pos.	PFF NMCC	UFL Cup	AFC PC
Not part of the league yet				Semi-finals	Quarter-finals	—
2012	2	12	1st (Prom)	—	Quarter-finals	—
2013	1	10	5th	Quarter-finals	2nd	DNQ
2014	1	9	6th	—	—	DNQ
2015	1	10	8th	—	Quarter-Final	—

Key

- Tms. = Number of teams
- Pos. = Position in league
- Prom = Promoted
- TBD = To be determined
- DNQ = Did not qualify

Note: Performances of the club indicated here was after the UFL created (as a semi-pro league) in 2009.

== Honors ==
=== Domestic competitions ===
- United Football League Division 2
  - Winners: 2012
