= Sunken Garden United F.C. =

Sunken Garden United
- Full name: Sunken Garden United Football Club
- Founded: 1997; 29 years ago
- Coach: Ryan Saranillo
- League: UFL Division 2
Home colours	Away colours	Third colours

Sunken Garden United Football Club is a football based club in the Philippines. It was founded in 1997 based on the home field of the club, which is called Sunken Garden located inside the University of the Philippines main campus in Diliman, Quezon City. It played in the United Football League's Division 2.

The club participates in a public and private partnership to create the World Cup Pilipinas, which is a month-long annual football tournament beginning in late May.

The club is registered with the Philippine Securities and Exchange Commission as an athletic organization.
