= Cimarron F.C. =

Soccer club in the Philippines

Cimarron
- Full name: Cimarron Football Club
- Founded: 2005; 21 years ago
- Ground: University of the Philippines Football Field
- League: UFL Division 2

The Cimarron Football Club, formerly known as Diliman Football Club, was a professional football club based in Diliman, Quezon City, Philippines.

== History ==
It was established in 2005 by the alumni of the University of the Philippines, Diliman, and is mainly composed of the former players of the UP Diliman Men's Varsity Football Team.

In recent years, Diliman FC has joined several tournaments including the 2nd season of the United Football League (UFL) where it place 2nd overall. The UFL is the country's most prestigious football competition. Other tournaments joined were the Republic Cup (Champion) in 2008 and the Laurel Cup (2nd place) in 2010.

Restructuring of the team and the establishment of a formal management group sparked the renewal of operations this year and the team's reentry into the UFL. This development sets up the club to achieve its long-term goal, which is to professionalize the organization.

=== 2012 season ===
After a successful 2012 UFL season in which they finished 2nd to Pachanga F.C., almost nearly promoted to Division 1, the club announced that they have merged with Pachanga F.C. following the latter's selling to the group led by Makati Football School and Diliman F.C.

== Honors ==
=== Domestic competitions ===
- United Football League Division 2

- Runners-up (1): 2012
