= United Football League Cup =

- Founded: 2009
- Abolished: 2016
- Teams: 12 (2016)
- Last champions: Global (2nd title)
- Most championships: Philippine Air Force; Global (2 titles)
- Broadcaster(s): AksyonTV; Hyper
- Website: UFL Cup
- 2016 UFL Cup

The United Football League Cup, commonly known as UFL Cup, was a Filipino association football competition. It was played on a multistage format that culminated in a knockout stage (single elimination). Clubs eligible to compete for the cup were those who played in the United Football League. Likewise, it was open to all clubs in the Philippines that passed the requirements given by the Football Alliance Group, which organized the competition. The UFL Cup run from mid-October to mid-December and was moved from May to August starting with the 2015 edition, to make it in line with the calendar of its Southeast Asian neighbors. It provided a chance for all clubs to play each other regardless of their league divisions.

The last holders of the UFL Cup were Global, who defeated Ceres 3–1 in the 2016 final for their second title.

== History ==
The UFL Cup was first held in October 2009 where it was known as UFL–LBC Cup, after the name of LBC Express Inc. as its title sponsor and is sanctioned by the National Capital Region Football Association (NCRFA) and the Philippine Football Federation (PFF). The purpose was to determine the distribution of clubs over the Divisions 1 and 2 of United Football League in its inaugural season. Clubs were divided into four groups of four, the top 2 finisher of each group after single round-robin elimination qualified for quarterfinals (for division one) and the bottom 2 battles for Plate Competition (for division two). Philippine Air Force was the inaugural cup champions by defeating Philippine Army 2–1.

The 2011 UFL Cup season marks the first live television coverage of a match after AKTV (owned and operated by TV5) inked the historical 5-year multi-million peso deal with the UFL.

== Cup Winners And Runners-Up ==
Club	Champions	Years won	Runners-up	Years lost
Philippine Air Force	2	2009, 2011	1	2010
Global	2	2010, 2016	1	2012
Loyola	1	2013	1	2011
Stallion	1	2012	0	
Kaya	1	2015	0	
Ceres	0		2	2015, 2016
Philippine Army	0		1	2009
Pachanga Diliman	0		1	2013

== Top goal scorers by edition ==
Year	Scorer	Club	Goals
2009	(Philippines) Yanti Barsales	Philippine Air Force	8
2010	(Sudan) Izzeldin Elhabbib	Global	8
2011	(Philippines) Phil Younghusband	Loyola	25
2012	(Philippines) Phil Younghusband	Loyola	10
2013	(Philippines) Phil Younghusband	Loyola	21
2015	(Saint Kitts and Nevis) Tishan Hanley	Kaya	15
2016	(Senegal) Robert Lopez Mendy	Kaya	11

== Venues ==
Primary venues used in the 2012 UFL Cup:

Manila	Taguig	Makati
Rizal Memorial Football Stadium	ASCom Football Field	University of Makati Stadium
Capacity: 12,873	Capacity: 1,000	Capacity: 4,000
Santa Rosa, Laguna	Marikina	Parañaque
NUVALI FieldS #1 & #2, Nuvali	Marikina Sports Complex	Nomads Field
Capacity: N/A	Capacity: 30,000	Capacity: 3,000
