= List of Filipino football champions =

The historical absence of a continuously operating national league and a multi-division football system has made it difficult to truly determine and recognize the highest level tournament in the Philippines. The Philippine Football Federation, the governing body of football in the Philippines, has held men's national championship tournaments in various forms since 1911. The winners of these tournaments are therefore considered the de facto football champions of the Philippines. The latest of these national competitions is the Philippines Football League, which began its inaugural season in 2017.

Given the complex history of football in the Philippines, this article takes into account all notable "national" football competitions organized by the Philippine Football Federation. Also included is the National Capital Region-based United Football League and the PFF Women's League.

== Philippine Football Federation competitions ==
=== National championship (1911–present) ===
Various tournaments and leagues have been directly organized by the Philippine Football Federation, such as the Philippine Football League, the Manila Premier Football League (MPFL), the P-League, the National Men's Open Championship, the National Men's Club Championship and currently the Philippines Football League. The majority of these leagues were often short-lived, and thus do not have a champions list readily available. The champions of these tournaments are lumped together in the following tables as "national champions".

National champions
Season	Champions	From
1911	All Manila	Manila
1912	Bohemian Sporting Club	Manila
1913	Bohemian Sporting Club	Manila
1914	Manila Nomads	Parañaque
1915	Bohemian Sporting Club	Manila
1916	Bohemian Sporting Club	Manila
1917	Bohemian Sporting Club	Manila
1918	Bohemian Sporting Club	Manila
1919	No tournament	
1920	Bohemian Sporting Club	Manila
1921	Bohemian Sporting Club	Manila
1922	Bohemian Sporting Club	Manila
1923	Ferencvárosi TC	Hungary
1924	Cantabria F.C.	Spain
1925	International	Manila
1926	Ateneo F.C.	Manila
1927	Bohemian Sporting Club	Manila
1928	San Beda Athletic Club	Manila
1929	Peña Iberica	Spain
1930	San Beda Athletic Club	Manila
1931	San Beda Athletic Club	Manila
1932	San Beda Athletic Club	Manila
1933	San Beda Athletic Club	Manila
1934	University of Santo Tomas	Manila
1935	Malaya Command	Singapore
No tournament from 1936 to 1966; Only the Manila Football League until 1967
1967	Manila Lions	Manila
1968	Meralco Reddy Kilowatts	Quezon City
1969	No tournament	
1970–71	Dragons	Manila
1972	Meralco Reddy Kilowatts	Quezon City
No tournament from 1973 to 1977
1978–79	San Miguel Corporation	Mandaluyong
1979	Barotac Nuevo F.C.	Iloilo
1980	San Miguel Corporation	Mandaluyong
1980–81	CDCP	Manila
1981–82	Philippine Navy	Manila
1982–83	Philippine Air Force	Manila
1983–84	San Miguel Corporation	Mandaluyong
1985	Philippine Air Force	Manila
1986	No tournament	
1987	Dumaguete F.C.	Dumaguete
1988	M. Lhuillier Jewelers F.C.	Cebu City
1989	Philippine Air Force	Manila
1990	Bacolod F.C.	Bacolod
1991	Philippine Navy	Manila
1992	Philippine Army	Manila
1993	Davao City F.C.	Davao City
1994	Pasay	Pasay
1995	Makati	Makati
1996	No tournament	
1997	Philippine Air Force	Manila
1998	National Capital Region-South (Note: National Capital Region was also known as National Capital Region-B and National Capital Region-South.)	NCR
1999	National Capital Region-B (Note: National Capital Region-B was a combination of Navy and Air Force.)	NCR
2000	National Capital Region-South	NCR
2001	Philippine Army	Manila
2002	Negros Occidental F.A.	Negros Occidental
2003	Kaya (Note: Kaya–Iloilo was known as Kaya until 2017 and Kaya–Makati until 2018.)	Makati
2004	National Capital Region	NCR
2005	National Capital Region	NCR
2006	Negros Occidental F.A.	Negros Occidental
2007	National Capital Region	NCR
2008	Tournament not finished	
No tournament from 2009 to 2010
2011	Teknika (Note: Global was competing under the name Teknika for sponsorship reasons in 2011.)	Tacloban
2012–13	Ceres (Note: United City were known as Ceres until 2017 and Ceres–Negros until 2020.)	Bacolod
2013–14	Ceres	Bacolod
2014–15	Loyola Meralco Sparks (Note: Loyola F.C. was known as Loyola Meralco Sparks until 2017 and Meralco Manila until 2018.)	Quezon City
2016	No tournament	
2017	Ceres–Negros	Bacolod
2018	Ceres–Negros	Bacolod
2019	Ceres–Negros	Bacolod
2020	United City	Capas
2021	Not held due to COVID-19 pandemic in the Philippines	
2022–23	Kaya–Iloilo	Iloilo City
2024	Kaya–Iloilo	Iloilo City
2024–25	Kaya–Iloilo	Iloilo City
2025–26	Manila Digger	Taguig

=== Philippine Football League (1995) ===
First attempt of the Philippine Football League.

Season	Champions	Score/s	Runners-up
1995	Makati	No playoffs	Lipa-Pasay

=== Manila Premier Football League (1997) ===
Season	Champions	Score/s	Runners-up
1997	Philippine Air Force		Philippine Army

=== P-League (1998–2000) ===
Second attempt of the Philippine Football League. Renamed as the P-League in 1998.

Season	Champions	Score/s	Runners-up
1998	National Capital Region-South	3–1	Negros Occidental F.A.
1999	National Capital Region-B (Navy and Air Force combination)		Davao
2000	National Capital Region-South	3–1	Negros Occidental F.A.

=== National Men's Open Championship (2005–2007) ===
Season	Champions	Score/s	Runners-up
2005	National Capital Region F.A.	0–0; Penalties: 4–3	Negros Occidental F.A.
2006	Negros Occidental F.A.	2–1	National Capital Region F.A.
2007	National Capital Region F.A.	2–1	Negros Occidental F.A.

=== Filipino Premier League (2008) ===
The Filipino Premier League was planned to be held in three regional tournaments; one for Luzon, Visayas, and Mindanao, and culminate with the Filipino Premier League National Championships to be held in late 2009. However, the Visayas and Mindanao regional tournaments that was planned for the first half of 2009 was canceled, as well as the subsequent national championship. Thus, the Luzon tournament winner, Philippine Army, is not considered a "national champion".

Season	Champions	Score/s	Runners-up
2008	Philippine Army	2–0	Giligan's F.C.

=== National Men's Club Championship (2011–2015) ===
Season	Champions	Score/s	Runners-up
2011	Teknika F.C.	3–0; 0–2; Aggregate: 3–2	Smart–San Beda F.C.
2012–13	Ceres F.C.	1–0	PSG F.C.
2013–14	Ceres F.C.	2–1; 1–0; Aggregate: 3–1	Global F.C.
2014–15	Loyola Meralco Sparks F.C.	2–0	Global F.C.

=== Philippines Football League (2017–present) ===
Season	Champions	Score/s	Runners-up
2017	Ceres–Negros	4–1	Global Cebu
2018	Ceres–Negros	No playoffs	Kaya–Iloilo
2019	Ceres–Negros	No playoffs	Kaya–Iloilo
2020	United City	No playoffs	Kaya–Iloilo
2021	Not held due to COVID-19 pandemic in the Philippines		
2022–23	Kaya–Iloilo	No playoffs	Dynamic Herb Cebu
2024	Kaya–Iloilo	No playoffs	Dynamic Herb Cebu
2024–25	Kaya–Iloilo	No playoffs	Manila Digger
2025–26	Manila Digger	No playoffs	One Taguig

=== Performance by club ===
Only Philippine clubs are listed in the table.

Club	Winners	Winning seasons
Bohemian Sporting Club	10	1912, 1913, 1915, 1916, 1917, 1918, 1920, 1921, 1922, 1927
National Capital Region F.A.	6	1998, 1999, 2000, 2004, 2005, 2007
United City	6	2012–13, 2013–14, 2017, 2018, 2019, 2020
San Beda Athletic Club	5	1928, 1930, 1931, 1932, 1933
Philippine Air Force	4	1982–83, 1985, 1989, 1997
Kaya–Iloilo	4	2003, 2022–23, 2024, 2024–25
San Miguel Corporation	3	1978–79, 1980, 1983–84
Meralco Reddy Kilowatts	2	1968, 1972
Philippine Navy	2	1981–82, 1991
Philippine Army	2	1992, 2001
Negros Occidental F.A.	2	2002, 2006
All Manila	1	1911
Manila Nomads	1	1914
International	1	1925
Ateneo F.C.	1	1926
University of Santo Tomas	1	1934
Manila Lions	1	1967
Dragons	1	1970–71
Barotac Nuevo F.C.	1	1979
CDCP	1	1980–81
Dumaguete F.C.	1	1987
M. Lhuillier Jewelers F.C.	1	1988
Bacolod F.C.	1	1990
Davao City F.C.	1	1993
Pasay	1	1994
Makati	1	1995
Global F.C.	1	2011
Loyola F.C.	1	2014–15
Manila Digger	1	2025–26

== Women's competitions ==
=== Philippine Ladies' Football National League (1981) ===
Season	Champions	Score/s	Runners-up
1981	University of the Philippines	No playoffs	Philippine Air Force

=== PFF National Women's Open Football Championship ===
Season	Champions	Score/s	Runners-up	Ref.
2004	Davao F.A.	No information (won by penalties)	National Capital Region F.A.	
2005	Davao F.A.	5–0	Cebu F.A.	
2006	National Capital Region F.A.	3–1	Negros Oriental F.A.	

=== PFF Women's League (2016–present) ===
Season	Champions	Score/s	Runners-up
2016–17	De La Salle University	No playoffs	University of Santo Tomas
2018	De La Salle University	No playoffs	University of Santo Tomas
2019–20	De La Salle University	No playoffs	Far Eastern University
2020	Not held due to COVID-19 pandemic in the Philippines		
2021	Not held due to COVID-19 pandemic in the Philippines		
2023	Kaya–Iloilo	1–0	Manila Digger
2025	Kaya–Iloilo	No playoffs	Stallion Laguna

== Other competitions ==
=== Manila Football League (1930–1967) ===
The Philippine Football Federation did not hold a national tournament from 1936 to 1966. Only the Manila Football League was organized. This league began in 1930 and was restricted to clubs from the Manila metropolitan area. The winners of the Manila Football League are not considered "national champions". Its final competition was in 1967.

Manila Football League
Season	Champions	From
1930	De la Salle College	Manila
No tournament from 1931 to 1935
1936	De la Salle College	Manila
1937	De la Salle College	Manila
1938	De la Salle Football Club	Manila
1939	YCO Athletic Club	Manila
1940	YCO Athletic Club	Manila
1941	YCO Athletic Club	Manila
No tournament from 1942 to 1946
1947	Turba Salvaje	Manila
1948	Turba Salvaje	Manila
1949	Turba Salvaje	Manila
1950	No tournament	
1951	San Miguel Brewery	Manila
1952	Turba Salvaje	Manila
1953	IL-FGU (Insurance Life Fidelity Guaranty Underwriters)	Manila
1954	YCO Athletic Club	Manila
1955	Manila Lions	Manila
1956	Manila Lions	Manila
1957	Manila Lions	Manila
1958	Manila Lions	Manila
1959	Manila Lions	Manila
1960	Manila Lions	Manila
1961	Manila Lions	Manila
Not known from 1962 to 1965
1966	Philippine Navy	Manila
1967	Electron	Manila

=== United Football League (2009–2016) ===
The United Football League Division 1 was based in the National Capital Region of the Philippines and established as a "premier league" in 2009. The league was a round-robin format and also had a second division. The winners listed below do not include the winners of the UFL Cup, a knockout-tournament which allowed teams to participate regardless of their division. In a season, the cup competition was held first from mid-October to mid-December, followed by the league competition from January to June of the following year. The winners of the United Football League are not considered "national champions".

Year	Champions	Runners-up	Third place	Leading goalscorer	Goals
2010	Philippine Air Force	Kaya	Union	(Sudan) Izzo Elhabbib (Kaya)	14
2011	Philippine Air Force	Global	Philippine Army	(Sudan) Izzo Elhabbib (Global)	7
2012	Global	Kaya	Loyola	(Philippines) Phil Younghusband (Loyola)	23
2013	Stallion	Global	Loyola	(Spain) Rufo Sánchez (Stallion)	18
2014	Global	Loyola	Kaya	(Philippines) Mark Hartmann (Global)	27
2015	Ceres	Global	Loyola	(Spain) Adrián Gallardo (Ceres)	18
2016	Global	Ceres	Loyola	(Spain) Adrián Gallardo (Ceres)	30

=== Philippines Football League Finals Series (2017, 2024–25) ===
The Finals Series has been a separate competition from the PFL regular season and features the top 4 teams in the league table. It is held after the conclusion of the season.

Season	Champions	Score/s	Runners-up
2017	Same as league champions (Finals Series part of league proper)		
2018–2024	Not held		
2024–25	Dynamic Herb Cebu	1–0	Manila Digger

=== PFF U16 National Boys' Championship (2026–present) ===
Season	Champions	Score/s	Runners-up	Ref.
2026	National Capital Region F.A.	4–1	Iloilo-Guimaras R.F.A	
