= 2012–13 PFF National Men's Club Championship =

2013 PFF National Men's Club Championship
Tournament details
- Country: Philippines
- Dates: 17 October 2012 – 2 February 2013
- Teams: 16 (Finals)

Final positions
- Champions: Ceres
- Runners-up: PSG

Tournament statistics
- Matches played: 16
- Goals scored: 50 (3.13 per match)
- Top goal scorer: Chieffy Caligdong

Awards
- Best player: Byeong Yun-joon

The 2012–13 PFF National Men's Club Championship (also known as 2012–13 PFF–Smart National Club Championship) was the 2nd season of the PFF National Men's Club Championship, a Filipino association football competition organized by the Philippine Football Federation.

Global Teknika were the defending champions.

On February 2, 2013, Ceres defeated PSG with a 1–0 scoreline to win the title.

== Competition format ==
Similar to the previous tournament, the Smart National Club championships this year had cluster and regional eliminations outside of Manila and the quarterfinal matches were hosted in the provinces. There were two clusters for Luzon, one for Visayas, four for Mindanao and one for the National Capital Region. After the cluster eliminations, there was a Luzon, Visayas and Mindanao eliminations, where the top two teams advanced to the quarterfinal round along with the top 10 teams that were participating in the UFL Cup. There was another drawing of lots for the quarterfinal round and if a provincial team faced a UFL club, that game will be hosted by the provincial football associations. The Provincial Football Association (PFA) teams who made the quarterfinal round was given a transfer window to allow teams to add or drop eight players for their 25-man squad. This was done to help boost the provincial teams.

Teams played in a single round-robin format with the top teams advancing to the regional eliminations. Top two teams from each group advanced to the Round of 16, the start of the knockout stage, wherein they were joined by the top 10 UFL teams. In the Round of 16, qualified teams were divided into two groups. The top 8 UFL teams comprised the first group and the remaining two UFL teams joined the six regional qualifiers from Luzon, Visayas and Mindanao in the second group. Only two matches were played in Manila as the rest were played in the provinces. If a provincial team drew a UFL team, the match will be played in their turf. The top eight teams from the Round of 16 advanced to the quarterfinals, top four to the semifinals and top two to the finals.

Top two teams in Mindanao joined top two teams of Luzon, top two teams from Visayas and top ten United Football League teams for the round of 16 which started on 12 January 2012. The tournament will also serve as a qualifying process of teams which have plans to join the country’s premier football league – the United Football League (UFL).

== Qualifying round ==
Member Associations (MA) of the Philippine Football Federation organized their own tournaments as part of Provincial Qualifying Rounds to determine their representatives to the group stages.

=== National Capital Region Cluster ===
Top ten teams of the 2012 UFL Cup from National Capital Region F.A. moved to the knockout stages.

- General Trias International FC ^{1}
- Global
- Green Archers United
- Kaya
- Loyola
- Manila Nomads
- Pachanga Diliman
- PSG
- Philippine Army
- Stallion ^{2}

^{1} Competing as a guest club in the UFL; General Trias International FC is a member of Cavite Football Association.
^{2} Competing as a Division 1 club in the UFL; Stallion is a member of Iloilo Football Association.

=== Luzon Cluster ===
North, Central and South Luzon cluster eliminations were held in La Trinidad, Benguet on October 17, 2012.

- Baguio United FC represents Baguio City Football Association
- Football Association of Tarlac
- Flame United FC represents Cavite Football Association
- LB United FC represents Laguna Football Association
- San Beda FC represents Football Association of Rizal
- Adriatico FC represents Oriental Mindoro Football Association

Southeast Luzon cluster eliminations were held in Naga City

- Camarines Norte Football Association
- Legaspi City-Albay Federated Football Association
- Federated Football Association of Masbate
- ABC Stars FC represents Naga City-Camarines Sur Football Association
- Quezon Football Association
- University of Batangas FC represents Football Association of Batangas

=== Visayas Cluster ===
Visayas region with its lone cluster held its regional elimination in San Carlos City.

- Cebu Queen City United, winner of the 14th Aboitiz Cup Men’s Open, represents Cebu Football Association.
- Ceres represents Negros Occidental Football Association.
- Iloilo Football Association
- Baybay FC, winner of the KULAS Cup last August 4–5, 2012, represents Leyte Football Association
- Negros Oriental Football Association

Iloilo Football Association and Negros Oriental Football Association withdrew participation later on.

Ceres and Cebu Queen City United qualified for the knockout stages.

=== Mindanao Cluster ===
Mindanao hosted the most number of cluster elimination rounds, taking place in Malaybalay on 17 October 2012 while South Cotabato and Dipolog commenced thereafter. Davao City commenced their qualification matches earlier, on October 3, 2012. 16 football associations in the Mindanao region took part.

North Mindanao cluster was held in Malaybalay City.

- Malaybalay United FC represents Bukidnon Football Association
- Cuartel FC represents Butuan-Agusan del Norte Football Association
- Montecarlo FC represents Cagayan de Oro-Misamis Oriental Football Association
- Advocates FC represents Iligan-Lanao del Norte Football Association
- Surigao City FC represents Surigao del Norte Football Association

Central Mindanao cluster was held in South Cotabato.

- Maguindanao-Cotabato City Football Association
- M'lang FC represents North Cotabato Football Association
- Real Marbel FC represents Football Association of South Cotabato
- Sultan Kudarat Football Association

South Mindanao cluster was held in Davao City.

- Hooligans FC represents Davao Football Association
- PNP FC represents Davao del Norte Football Association.

West Mindanao cluster was held in Dipolog.

- Misamis Occidental-Ozamiz City Football Association
- Alberei FC represents Zamboanga Football Association
- Romgarjal FC represents Zamboanga del Norte-Dipolog Football Association
- Zamboanga del Sur-Pagadian Football Association

== Regional Championships ==
Games were played in single round-robin format where winners and runners-up advanced to the next round.

Key to colours in group tables
Group winners and runners-up advance to the knock out stage

All times are Philippine Standard Time (PST) – UTC+8.

=== All-Luzon Championship ===
Luzon will stage their regional eliminations in Laguna. Winners and runners-up from both Luzon clusters will advance to the All-Luzon Championship and will compete in single-round robin format.

- Flame United FC of Cavite Football Association, winner of North, Central and South Luzon cluster eliminations
- Baguio United FC of Baguio Football Association, runner-up of North, Central and South Luzon cluster eliminations
- Federated Football Association of Masbate
- ABC Stars FC of Naga City-Camarines Sur Football Association

Team	Pld	W	D	L	GF	GA	GD	Pts
Flame United FC	3	3	0	0	19	4	+15	9
Baguio United FC	3	2	0	1	10	6	+4	6
FFA of Masbate	2	0	0	2	4	9	−5	0
ABC Stars FC	2	0	0	2	3	17	−14	0

16 November 2012

Baguio United FC	5 – 2	ABC Stars FC

University of the Philippines Los Baños
16 November 2012

Flame United FC	5 – 2	FFA of Masbate

University of the Philippines Los Baños
17 November 2012

Flame United FC	2 – 1	Baguio United FC

University of the Philippines Los Baños
17 November 2012^{3}

ABC Stars FC	v	FFA of Masbate

University of the Philippines Los Baños
18 November 2012

Flame United FC	12 – 1	ABC Stars FC

University of the Philippines Los Baños
18 November 2012

Baguio United FC	4 – 2	FFA of Masbate

University of the Philippines Los Baños

^{3} No data.

=== All-Mindanao Championship ===
Mindanao will stage their regional eliminations in Davao City. Winners from the four Mindanao clusters will advance to the All-Mindanao Championship and will compete in single-round robin format.

- Advocates FC of Iligan-Lanao del Norte Football Association, winner of North Mindanao cluster eliminations
- Hooligans FC of Davao Football Association, winner of South Mindanao cluster eliminations.
- M’Lang FC, winner of Central Mindanao qualifiers
- Ramgarjal FC of Zamboanga del Norte-Dipolog Football Association, winner of Western Mindanao qualifiers

Advocates FC back out at the last minute, leaving three clubs in the regional eliminations.

Team	Pld	W	D	L	GF	GA	GD	Pts
Romgarjal FC	3	2	1	0	8	2	+6	7
M’Lang FC	3	2	0	1	7	5	+2	6
Hooligans FC	3	1	1	1	5	4	+1	4
Advocates FC	3	0	0	3	0	9	−9	0

23 November 2012
13:00

Advocates FC	0 – 3	Romgarjal FC

Tionko Field, Qiumpo Boulevard, Davao City
23 November 2012
15:00

M'Lang FC	3 – 1	Hooligans FC

Tionko Field, Qiumpo Boulevard, Davao City
24 November 2012
13:00

Romgarjal FC	4 – 1	M'Lang FC

Tionko Field, Qiumpo Boulevard, Davao City
24 November 2012
13:00

Hooligans FC	3 – 0	Advocates FC

Tionko Field, Qiumpo Boulevard, Davao City
25 November 2012
13:00

Romgarjal FC	1 – 1	Hooligans FC

Tionko Field, Quimpo Boulevard, Davao City
25 November 2012
15:00

Advocates FC	0 – 3	M'Lang FC

Tionko Field, Quimpo Boulevard, Davao City

== Knockout stage ==
The draw for the qualified teams from regional qualifiers was made at the Philippine Football Federation headquarters on 7 December 2012. Knock-out stages was held starting January 19, 2013.

Round of 16
January 13 - Bacolod
Ceres	1
Stallion	0
January 13 - Manila
Global	2
Manila Nomads	1
January 9 - Koronadal
M'lang FC	0
Kaya	5
January 12 - Manila
Flame United FC	0
Loyola	8
January 12 - Cebu City
Cebu Queen City United	1
Pachanga Diliman	3
January 12 - Dapitan
Romgarjal FC	1
Green Archers United	6
January 13 - Manila
PSG	2
Philippine Army	1
January 12 - La Trinidad
Baguio United FC	1
General Trias International	3

Quarter-finals
January 19 - Manila
Ceres	1
Global	0
January 19 - Manila
Kaya	1
Loyola	0
January 20 - Manila
Pachanga Diliman	0
Green Archers United (a.e.t.)	1
January 20 - Manila
PSG (a.e.t.)	1
General Trias International	0

Semi-finals
January 26 - Manila
Ceres	3
Kaya	1
January 26 - Manila
Green Archers United	2 (1)
PSG (p)	2 (2)

Final
February 2 - Manila
Ceres	1
PSG	0
Third place
February 2 - Manila
Kaya	2
Green Archers United	0

=== Round of 16 ===
All times are Philippine Standard Time (PST) – UTC+8.

January 13, 2013	Ceres	1 – 0	Stallion	Bacolod
15:00	Jung-mook 45'	Details		Stadium: Panaad Stadium

January 13, 2013	Global	2 – 1	Manila Nomads	Manila
18:30	de Murga 71'; Fogg 82' (o.g.)	Details	Magassa 90+1' (pen.)	Stadium: Rizal Memorial Stadium

January 9, 2013	M'lang FC	0 – 5	Kaya	Koronadal City
14:00		Details	Burkey 2', 30' (pen.); C. Greatwich 34'; Ðakić 84'; Bantayan 85' (o.g.)	Stadium: South Cotabato Sports Complex

January 12, 2013	Flame United FC	0 – 8	Loyola	Manila
16:00		Details	M. A. Hartmann 18', 25'; J. Younghusband 38'; M. J. Hartmann 49', 72', 86'; P. Younghusband 67', 76'	Stadium: Rizal Memorial Stadium

January 12, 2013	Cebu Queen City United	1 – 3	Pachanga Diliman	Cebu City
15:00	Olaniyi 45+1'	Details	Bedic 38'; Cunliffe 67'; Clariño 88'	Stadium: Aboitiz Sports Field

January 12, 2013	Romgarjal FC	1 – 6	Green Archers United	Dapitan
15:00	Daga-ang 20'	Details	Simpron 1'; Villareal 4'; Pasilan 36', 55'; Caligdong 40', 90'	Stadium: Jose Rizal Memorial State University

January 13, 2013	PSG	2 – 1	Philippine Army	Manila
16:00	Taher 9'; Mbata 21'	Details	Becite 67'	Stadium: Rizal Memorial Stadium

January 12, 2013	Baguio United FC	1 – 3	General Trias International	La Trinidad
15:00	Lingwayon 43'	Details	Park Yi-young 33'; Cha Won-jae 54'; Lee Seong-woo 87'	Stadium: Benguet State University Football Field

=== Quarter-finals ===
January 19, 2013	Ceres	1 – 0	Global	Manila
16:00	Long 12'	Details		Stadium: Rizal Memorial Stadium

January 19, 2013	Kaya	1 – 0	Loyola Meralco Sparks	Manila
18:30	Porteria 58'	Details		Stadium: Rizal Memorial Stadium

January 20, 2013	Green Archers United	1 – 0 (a.e.t.)	Pachanga Diliman	Manila
16:00	Caligdong 114'	Details		Stadium: Rizal Memorial Stadium

January 20, 2013	PSG	1 – 0 (a.e.t.)	General Trias International	Manila
18:30	Verheye 108'	Details		Stadium: Rizal Memorial Stadium

=== Semi-finals ===
January 26, 2013	Ceres	3 – 1	Kaya	Manila
16:00	Panhay 24'; Byeong 41'; Choi 80' (pen.)		C. Greatwich 50'	Stadium: Rizal Memorial Stadium

January 26, 2013	Green Archers United	2 – 2 (a.e.t.) (1 – 2 p)	PSG	Manila
18:30	Caligdong 18'; Simpron 19'		Ujam 20'; Amirkhizan 24'	Stadium: Rizal Memorial Stadium
	Penalties
	Caligdong (penalty scored); Pasilan (penalty missed); Cagayanan (penalty missed); Escoltero (penalty missed); Ayi (penalty missed)		(penalty scored) Hamed; (penalty scored) Sumudivilla; (penalty missed) Fernandez; (penalty missed) Consthan Harris

=== Third place ===
February 2, 2013	Kaya	2 – 0	Green Archers United	Manila
16:00	Kigbu 14'; Ugarte 45+2'			Stadium: Rizal Memorial Stadium

=== Finals ===
February 2, 2013	Ceres	1 – 0	PSG	Manila
18:30	Byeong 56'			Stadium: Rizal Memorial Stadium

== Top goalscorers ==
Top Goal Scorers starting Round of 16.

Rank	Player	Club	Goals
1	(Philippines) Chieffy Caligdong	Green Archers United	4
2	(Philippines) Matthew Hartmann	Loyola	3
3	(Philippines) Nate Burkey	Kaya	2
3	(Philippines) Chris Greatwich	Kaya	2
3	(Philippines) Mark Hartmann	Loyola	2
3	(Philippines) Tating Pasilan	Green Archers United	2
3	(Philippines) Jovanie Simpron	Green Archers United	2
3	(South Korea) Byeong Yun Joon	Ceres	2
3	(Philippines) Phil Younghusband	Loyola	2

Correct as of 21:00, February 2, 2013

=== Awards ===
The following were the competition’s top individual awardees.

- Fair Play Award: Green Archers United
- Golden Boot: (Philippines) Chieffy Caligdong
- Most Valuable Player: (South Korea) Byeong Yun Joon
- Best Defender: (South Korea) Kyeon Hyeong Park
- Best Midfielder: (Philippines) Joshua Beloya
- Golden Gloves: (South Korea) Jae Hun Hyeon
