= 2011 PFF National Men's Club Championship =

Tournament details
- Country: Philippines
- Date: 1 April – 22 August
- Teams: 36

Final positions
- Champions: Global Teknika
- Runners-up: San Beda FC

The 2011 PFF National Men's Club Championship (known as the PFF–Smart Men's Club Championship for sponsorship reasons) is the 1st season of a Filipino association football competition organized by the Philippine Football Federation and sponsored by mobile phone and Internet service provider Smart Communications. It revives a national tournament discontinued since 2006. The last nationwide competition was a National Men's Open Tournament held in Bacolod under the presidency of Juan Miguel Romualdez. Plans were conceived for a similar national competition under Romualdez's successor Jose Mari Martinez but did not push through for a variety of reasons.

Global Teknika emerged the champions on August 22, 2011 after winning against San Beda F.C. on a 3-2 aggregate.

== Competition format ==
Member Associations (MA) of the Philippine Football Federation organize their own tournaments as part of Provincial Qualifying Rounds in March 2011 to determine their representatives to the group stages. The Cluster Qualifying Rounds was held in a single-round robin competition from April 1–16, 2011. Each MA is only allowed one club as a representative. Clubs from the Visayas region (Cebu, Iloilo, Leyte, Negros Occidental, Negros Oriental) and the National Capital Region competed in the Regional Qualifying Rounds while waiting for the winners of the Luzon and Mindanao clusters. Top four teams from the Luzon Cluster Qualifying Round and the top team from each of the Mindanao group clusters will advance to All-Luzon and All-Mindanao Championship. The top two clubs from NCR, Luzon, Visayas, and Mindanao will advance to the finals which was played in Cagayan de Oro and Bacolod from August 9–13, 2011. The four teams that emerged from the group stage Quarterfinals were Teknika and Pachanga of National Capital Region F.A., San Beda of Football Association of Rizal, and Stallion of Iloilo Football Association. Crossover Semifinals were held on August 16–17, 2011 while the home-and-away finals was held on August 21 and 22, 2011. The Semifinals and the Finals were held at Rizal Memorial Stadium.

== Qualifying round ==
Regional qualifying rounds were conducted in single round robin tournament. The single-round robin competition took place from April 1–16 when football associations contested in the Cluster Qualifying Rounds where one club represented each Member Association. Clubs were allowed up to five foreign players but only four can play on the field at any given time.

=== National Capital Region Cluster ===
First and second best teams for National Capital Region Cluster earn a bye for the quarterfinals group stage. Teknika^{1} and Pachanga qualified for the quarterfinals group stage. At least 10 clubs from Metro Manila took part in the qualifiers.

- ^{1}Global FC competed under this name due to sponsorship reasons.
- Pachanga

=== Luzon Cluster ===
North, Central and South Luzon Cluster

- San Beda FC of Football Association of Rizal
- Baguio United FC, champions of 1st Mayor Mauricio G. Domogan Football Cup, represented Baguio City Football Association.
- Laguna Football Association
- Quezon Football Association
- Football Association of Tarlac

Southeast Luzon Cluster

- ABC Stars FC represented Naga City-Camarines Sur Football Association
- Football Association of Masbate
- Camarines Norte Football Association
- Legaspi City-Albay Federated Football Association
- Oriental Mindoro Football Association

=== Visayas Cluster ===
First and second best teams for Visayas Cluster earn a bye for the quarterfinals group stage.

- Stallion FC of Iloilo Football Association
- Laos FC of Leyte Football Association
- Cebu Football Association
- Negros Occidental Football Association
- DCCCO FC, winner of 1st Silliman Cup, represented Negros Oriental FA.

=== Mindanao Cluster ===
Mindanao was split into four sub-clusters: North, South, Central and West Mindanao Cluster.

North Mindanao Cluster

- Ba-o Breakers FC represented Iligan – Lanao del Norte Football Association
- Montecarlo FC
- Diego Silang FC
- Bukidnon Football Association
- Surigao del Norte Football Association

South Mindanao Cluster

- Medvil FC
- PNP FC
- Compostela Valley Football Association
- Agusan del Sur Football Association
- Columbia FC, winner of Ebocci-Davao Premier League, represented Davao Football Association.

Central Mindanao Cluster

- Real Marbel FC represented Football Association of South Cotabato
- Maguindanao-Cotabato City Football Association
- North Cotabato Football Association
- Sultan Kudarat Football Association

West Mindanao Cluster

- Bric-A-Brac FC represented Zamboanga del Sur - Pagadian Football Association
- Alia FC
- Stonefield FC
- DMC FC

== Regional Championship ==
=== All-Luzon Championship ===
Team	Pld	W	D	L	GF	GA	GD	Pts
San Beda FC	3	3	0	0	34	1	+33	9
Baguio United FC	3	2	0	1	4	6	−2	6
Masbate FC	3	1	0	2	4	14	−10	3
ABC Stars FC	3	0	0	3	1	22	−21	0

11 May 2011
13:00

ABC Stars FC	0 – 16	San Beda FC

University of the Philippines Los Baños
11 May 2011
15:00

Baguio United FC	1 – 0	Masbate FC

University of the Philippines Los Baños

12 May 2011
13:00

Masbate FC	1 – 12	San Beda FC

University of the Philippines Los Baños
12 May 2011
15:00

Baguio United FC	3 – 0	ABC Stars FC

University of the Philippines Los Baños

13 May 2011
13:00

San Beda FC	6 – 0	Baguio United FC

University of the Philippines Los Baños
13 May 2011
15:00

Masbate FC	3 – 1	ABC Stars FC

University of the Philippines Los Baños

=== All-Mindanao Championship ===
Team	Pld	W	D	L	GF	GA	GD	Pts
Ba-o Breakers FC	3	2	1	0	7	4	+3	7
Columbia FC	3	2	0	1	15	5	+10	6
Real Marbel FC	3	1	1	1	4	7	−3	4
Bric-A-Brac FC	3	0	0	3	1	11	−10	0

4 May 2011
13:30

Ba-o Breakers FC	5 – 3	Columbia FC

Tionko Football Grounds, Davao City
4 May 2011
15:30

Real Marbel FC	3 – 1	Bric-A-Brac FC

Tionko Football Grounds, Davao City

5 May 2011
13:30

Columbia FC	5 – 0	Real Marbel FC

Tionko Football Grounds, Davao City
5 May 2011
15:30

Ba-o Breakers FC	1 – 0	Bric-A-Brac FC

Tionko Football Grounds, Davao City

6 May 2011
13:30

Ba-o Breakers FC	1 – 1	Real Marbel FC

Tionko Football Grounds, Davao City
6 May 2011
15:30

Columbia FC	7 – 0	Bric-A-Brac FC

Tionko Football Grounds, Davao City

== Quarterfinals ==
Group A was held in Pelaez Sports Complex, Cagayan de Oro hosted by Cagayan de Oro-Misamis Oriental Football Association (CMOFA). Group A participants were Bao Breakers FC of Iligan, Laos FC of Leyte, San Beda FC of Rizal, and Teknika FC. Group B was held in Barotac Nuevo, Iloilo. Group B participants were Stallion FC, Columbia FC of Davao, Pachanga FC of NCR and Baguio United. The group stage matches were held from August 9–13, 2011.

=== Group A ===
Team	Pld	W	D	L	GF	GA	GD	Pts
San Beda FC	3	2	1	0	9	2	+7	7
Teknika	3	1	2	0	13	4	+9	5
Laos FC	3	1	1	1	11	3	+8	4
Ba-o Breakers FC	3	0	0	3	0	24	−24	0

9 August 2011
13:30

San Beda FC	6 – 0	Ba-o Breakers FC

Pelaez Sports Complex, Cagayan de Oro
9 August 2011
15:30

Laos FC	2 – 2	Teknika

Pelaez Sports Complex, Cagayan de Oro

11 August 2011
13:30

Ba-o Breakers FC	0 – 9	Teknika

Pelaez Sports Complex, Cagayan de Oro
11 August 2011
15:30

San Beda FC	1 – 0	Laos FC

Pelaez Sports Complex, Cagayan de Oro

13 August 2011
13:30

Ba-o Breakers FC	0 – 9	Laos FC

Pelaez Sports Complex, Cagayan de Oro
13 August 2011
15:30

San Beda FC	2 – 2	Teknika

Pelaez Sports Complex, Cagayan de Oro

=== Group B ===
Team	Pld	W	D	L	GF	GA	GD	Pts
Pachanga	3	2	0	1	11	2	+9	6
Stallion	3	2	0	1	13	5	+8	6
Columbia FC	3	2	0	1	4	3	+1	6
Baguio United FC	3	0	0	3	4	22	−18	0

9 August 2011
13:30

Baguio United FC	0 – 3	Columbia FC

Barotac Nuevo Football Field, Iloilo
9 August 2011
15:30

Stallion	0 – 2	Pachanga

Barotac Nuevo Football Field, Iloilo

11 August 2011
13:30

Pachanga	0 – 1	Columbia FC

CPU Football Field, Iloilo
11 August 2011
15:30

Baguio United FC	3 – 10	Stallion

CPU Football Field, Iloilo

13 August 2011
15:00

Columbia FC	0 – 3	Stallion

Barotac Nuevo Football Field, Iloilo
13 August 2011
15:00

Baguio United FC	1 – 9	Pachanga

CPU Football Field, Iloilo

== Knockout stage ==
Semi-finals
Teknika	2
Pachanga	0
Stallion	1
San Beda FC	2

Finals
Teknika	3	0	3
San Beda FC	0	2	2

=== Semifinals ===
15 August 2011
18:00

Stallion	1 – 2	San Beda FC
R. Doctora 62'		Melendres 16'; Fabroada 36'

Rizal Memorial Stadium, Manila
17 August 2011
18:00

Teknika	2 – 0	Pachanga
Bahadoran 13'; I. Elhabbib 86'

Rizal Memorial Stadium, Manila

=== Finals ===
20 August 2011
18:00

Teknika	3 – 0	San Beda FC
I. Elhabbib 27', 76', 86'

Rizal Memorial Stadium, Manila
22 August 2011
18:00

Teknika	0 – 2	San Beda FC
		P. Younghusband 13'; J. Younghusband 71'

Rizal Memorial Stadium, Manila

Teknika wins 3–2 on aggregate
