= 2013–14 PFF National Men's Club Championship =

2013 PFF National Men's Club Championship
Tournament details
- Country: Philippines
- Dates: 2 October – 21 December 2013
- Teams: 9 (Finals)

Final positions
- Champions: Ceres
- Runners-up: Global

Tournament statistics
- Matches played: 22
- Goals scored: 149 (6.77 per match)

The 2013 PFF National Men's Club Championship (also known as 2013 PFF–Smart National Club Championship) was the 3rd season of the PFF National Men's Club Championship, a Filipino association football competition organized by the Philippine Football Federation.

Ceres were the defending champions after beating PSG 1–0 on February 2, 2013. This is the first time the Negros Occidental-based club won the championship.

On 21 December 2013, Ceres retained the title after beating Global, 3–1 on aggregate in a two-leg finals. The cup winners, Ceres is guaranteed a place in the 2015 AFC Cup Play-off.

== Competition format ==
This competition increased its participating teams from 33 in the previous year to 46 teams, breaking Luzon, Visayas and Mindanao clusters into regional sub-clusters. The tournament format was single round-robin in group stage with top teams advancing to the next round. In this edition of the tournament, each team was allowed up to five foreign players in their rosters with up to three playing at a given time.

== Regional qualifiers ==
The regional cluster eliminations for the tournament started last October 2, 2013 with ten teams advancing to the second round of eliminations. From there, the top two teams contested the title in two legs to be played in a home-and-away format.

=== Luzon Cluster ===
North-central Luzon cluster was held from October 2 to 6, 2013 at Tarlac Sports Complex.

- BSU FC represented Baguio-Benguet Football Association.
- Representative (or selection) from Tarlac Football Association
- Representative from Pangasinan Football Association (or selection) was originally included, but later withdrew participation.
- Representative from Isabela Football Association (or selection) was originally included, but later withdrew participation.
- Representative from Ilocos Football Association (or selection) was originally included, but later withdrew participation.

South-central Luzon cluster was held from October 4 to 6, 2013 at General Trias Football Field, Cavite City/De La Salle University, Dasmariñas, Cavite.

- Flame United FC represented Cavite Football Association.
- San Beda-Mendiola FC represented Rizal Football Association
- Representative (or selection) from National Capital Region Football Association. Later on, NCR FA withdrew participation.
- Representative (or selection) from Olangapo-Zambales Football Association. Later on, Olongapo-Zambales FA withdrew participation.

South west Luzon cluster was held from October 16 to 20, 2013 at Sta. Cruz Sports Complex, Laguna.

- Air 21 FC represented Laguna Football Association
- Adriatico FC represented Oriental Mindoro Football Association
- Philippine Air Force-Phoenix FC represented Batangas Football Association. Batangas Football Association was later disqualified.
- Palawan FC represented Palawan Football Association
- Representative (or selection) from Quezon Football Association

South Luzon cluster was held from October 23 to 25, 2013 at Naga city.

- CBSUA FC represented Naga City-Camarines Sur Football Association.
- Representative (or selection) from Legaspi City-Albay Football Association
- Representative (or selection) from Sorsogon Football Association
- Representative (or selection) from Football Association of Masbate. Masbate later on withdrew from the tournament.
- Representative (or selection) from Camarines Norte Football Association

=== Visayas Cluster ===
Group stage for Visayas clusters was held in Bacolod and Cebu from November 8 to 17, 2013. Visayas cluster was grouped into two: West Visayas Cluster was held from October 2 to 6, 2013 at Panaad Sports Complex, Bacolod.

- Camella-Barotac Nuevo FC represented Iloilo Football Association
- Ceres-La Salle FC represented Negros Occidental Football Association
- FC Azukals represented Negros Oriental Football Association among the regional qualifiers which were held in October 2013. The Azukals came on top of nine other clubs in the 4th Silliman Football Club tournament held in Dumaguete. FC Azukals defeated Foundation University FC, 5–3 in the finals held on June 12, 2013, at Filomeno Cimafranca Ballfield, Silliman University.
- Representative (or selection) from Capiz Football Association. Later, Capiz FA withdrew participation.

East-central Visayas cluster was held from October 2 to 6, 2013 at Leyte Development Sports Center, Tacloban City.

- Hijos FC represented Northern Samar Football Association.
- Queen City United-Football Club represented Cebu Football Association.
- Global FC represented Leyte Football Association. Leyte Football Association was later disqualified. The PFF has later allowed Global FC to participate under Leyte FA. On October 26, 2013, Global FC routed against Hijos FC 23–0 at the Leyte Sports Development Center in Tacloban City during the regional qualifiers.
- Representative (or selection) from Bohol Football Association. Later on, Bohol FA withdrew participation.
- Representative (or selection) from Calbayog Football Association. Later on, Calbayog FA withdrew participation.

=== Mindanao Cluster ===
North Mindanao cluster was held from October 2 to 6, 2013 at Hon. Gregorio Pelaez Sports Center, Cagayan de Oro City.

- Montecarlo FC represented Cagayan de Oro-Misamis Oriental Football Association.
- Manolo Fortich FC represented Bukidnon Football Association.
- Oliveros FC represented from Iligan-Lanao del Norte Football Association. Iligan-Lanao del Norte FA later withdrew participation.
- Slakza FC represented Surigao del Norte Football Association.
- Representative (or selection) from Butuan-Agusan del Norte Football Association. Butuan-Agusan del Norte FA later withdrew participation.

Central Mindanao cluster was held from October 28 to 30, 2013 at Jose Rizal Memorial State University Sports Complex, Dapitan City.

- Alia FC represented Zamboanga City Football Association.
- Dipolog United FC represented Zamboanga del Norte-Dipolog Football Association.
- Royals FC represented Zamboanga del Sur-Pagadian Football Association.
- Representative (or selection) from Misamis Oriental-Ozamiz Football Association

South Mindanao cluster was held at the Davao del Norte Sports and Tourism Complex (DNSTC) in Tagum City from October 2 to 7, 2013 at Davao del Norte Sports and Cultural Center.

- Columbia FC represented Davao Football Association.
- Prosperidad FC represented Agusan del Sur Football Association.
- MACO FC represented Compostela Valley Football Association.
- UM Tagum FC represented Davao del Norte Football Association.
- Mati FC represented Mati-Davao Oriental Football Association.

West Mindanao cluster was held from October 18 to 20, 2013 at South Cotabato Sports Komplex, Koronadal.

- M'lang FC represented North Cotabato Football Association.
- Real Marbel FC represented Football Association of South Cotabato.
- Representative (or selection) from Maguindanao Cotabato City Football Association
- Representative (or selection) from Sultan Kudarat Football Association

== Group stage ==
Ten clubs from previous cluster eliminations advanced to the next round. Group Stage matches was held from December 9 to 13, 2013. with two groups of 5. Top two clubs advanced to semifinals.

=== Luzon Cluster ===
- BSU FC of Baguio-Benguet Football Association qualified for north-central Luzon cluster. BSU FC qualified by beating Tarlac FA, 5–0, on 2 October 2013.
- Flame United-Cherifer FC of Cavite Football Association qualified for south-central Luzon cluster. Flame United qualified by beating Mendiola FC, 2–1, on 5 October 2013.
- Palawan FC of Palawan Football Association qualified for south west Luzon cluster. Palawan FC qualified by drawing Laguna FA, 2-2, on 16 October 2013; routing Quezon FA, 10–0, on 17 October 2013; defeating Oriental Mindoro FA, 5–1, on 18 October 2013.
- CBSUA FC of Naga City-Camarines Sur Football Association qualified for south Luzon cluster. CBSUA FC qualified by beating Legazpi Albay, 1–0, FA on 23 October 2013; 6-0 drubbing of Sorsogon FA on 24 October 2013; and defeating Camarines Norte FA, 2–1, on 25 October 2013.

=== Visayas Cluster ===
- Global FC of Leyte Football Association qualified after defeating Cebu Queen City United FC.
- Ceres-La Salle FC of Negros Occidental Football Association qualified after defeating regional archrival Camella-Barotac Nuevo FC, 1–0, at the North Football Field in Talisay City on 6 October 2013.

=== Mindanao Cluster ===
- Manolo Fortich-Del Monte FC of Bukidnon Football Association qualified for north Mindanao cluster. Del Monte FC qualified by defeating Slakza FC, 5–2, on 3 October 2013; defeating Montecarlo FC, 3–1, on 5 October 2013.
- Columbia FC of Davao Football Association qualified for south Mindanao cluster. Columbia FC qualified by drawing Mati FC, 1-1, on 2 October 2013; defeating Maco FC, 6–1, on 3 October 2013; defeating UM Tagum FC, 3–0, on 4 October 2013; and routing Prosperidad FC, 7–1, on 6 October 2013.
- Alia FC of Zamboanga City Football Association qualified for central Mindanao cluster.
- M'lang FC of North Cotabato Football Association qualified for west Mindanao cluster. M'lang FC qualified by beating Sultan Kudarat FA, 8–2, on 18 October 2013 and beating neighbors South Cotabato, 2–1, on 20 October 2013. M'lang FC has withdrawn due to a regional meet that it has earlier pledged to participate.

Groupings were drawn on 7 December 2013.

Key to colours in group tables
Group winners and runners-up advance to the crossover Semi-Finals

All times are Philippine Standard Time (PST) – UTC+8.

=== Group A ===
Team	Pld	W	D	L	GF	GA	GD	Pts
Global	4	4	0	0	40	1	+39	12
BSU	4	2	0	2	11	13	−2	6
Palawan	4	2	0	2	12	16	−4	6
Columbia	4	2	0	2	7	14	−7	6
Alia	4	0	0	4	4	30	−26	0

9 December 2013	Global	8 – 1	BSU	Bago Sports Complex
13:00	Bahadoran 10', 20', 22'; M.A. Hartmann 16', 25', 51', 70'; M.J. Angeles 53'		Menzi 62'

9 December 2013	Alia	2 – 7	Palawan	Bago Sports Complex
15:00

10 December 2013	Palawan	0 – 11	Global	Bago Sports Complex
13:00

10 December 2013	BSU	4 – 0	Columbia	Bago Sports Complex
15:00	K. Levy 42'; Aoas Jr. 47', 49'; Menzi 69'

11 December 2013	Columbia	2 – 1	Palawan	Bago Sports Complex
13:00

11 December 2013	Global	13 – 0	Alia	Bago Sports Complex
15:00	Christiaens 5'; I. Elhabib 8', 26', 30', 33', 36', 52'; M. A. Hartmann 9', 18'; A. Guirado 15', 55' de Jong 35'; Bahadoran 50'

12 December 2013	Alia	1 – 5	Columbia	Bago Sports Complex
13:00	Alawaddin 83'		Acedo 8'; Giganto Jr. 44', 88'; Benitez 65'; Tamay 85'

12 December 2013	Palawan	4 – 1	BSU	Bago Sports Complex
13:00	A. Torres 37', 72'; Mendoza Jr. 51'; Bungay VI 75'		K. Levy 80'

13 December 2013	BSU	5 – 1	Alia	Bago Sports Complex
13:00	Aoas Jr. 15', 37', 79'; K. Levy 18', 64'		J. Tulawe 26'

13 December 2013	Columbia	0 – 8	Global	Bago Sports Complex
15:00			M. A. Hartmann 12'; R. Sanchez 18', 57'; A. Guirado 23', 27'; Christiaens 66'; M. J. Angeles 71', 88'

=== Group B ===
Team	Pld	W	D	L	GF	GA	GD	Pts
Ceres	3	3	0	0	26	0	+26	9
Flame United	3	2	0	1	9	4	+5	9
Del Monte	3	1	0	2	7	12	−5	3
CBSUA	3	0	0	3	3	29	−26	0
M'lang	0	0	0	0	0	0	0	0

9 December 2013	Flame United	7 – 0	CBSUA	University of St. La Salle, Bacolod
13:00	S.J. Shin 3'; Woo Song 18', 36'; Dexisne 21'; Orcine 25'; Obero 53' de Leon 81'

9 December 2013	Ceres	7 – 0	Del Monte	University of St. La Salle, Bacolod
15:00	G.H. Park 10'; J. Soriano 13'; Panhay 37', 42'; A. Marasigan 47'; J. Baguioro 62'; Beloya 73'

10 December 2013	Ceres	3 – 0	Flame United	University of St. La Salle, Bacolod
13:00	Beloya 4'; Pino 13' (o.g.); Panhay 28'

10 December 2013	CBSUA	3 – 6	Del Monte	University of St. La Salle, Bacolod
15:00	Oliver 12', 55'; Marco 44'		Dalaota 31', 46', 71'; Bordeos 37', 80'; Barola 75'

11 December 2013	Ceres	16 – 0	CBSUA	University of St. La Salle, Bacolod
13:00	Treyes 8', 75'; J. Soriano 11', 63', 72', 78', 84', 89'; Tacusalme 15'; Ariola 22'; Panhay 33'; Bedia Jr. 50'; Poderoso Jr. 54', 59'; J. Cordova 61', 80'

11 December 2013	Flame United	2 – 1	Del Monte	University of St. La Salle, Bacolod
15:00	Woo Song 61'; S. S. Jeon 71'		Sibulboro 14'

== Knockout stage ==
Top two squads advanced to the crossover semifinals where the No. 1 team of Group A clashes with the No. 2 squad of Group B and the No. 1 team of Group B tackles the No. 2 side of Group A in a pair of two home-and-away matches. The semis winners will move on the finals where they will battle it out for the coveted title, the nice top prize and the distinction as the best club team in the land. The venue is held at Panaad Sports Complex and North Football Field, Bacolod, Negros Occidental.

Semi-finals
Global	4	5	9
Flame United	0	0	0
Ceres	5	11	16
BSU	1	0	1

Finals
Global	1	0	1
Ceres	2	1	3

=== Semi-finals ===
Date is scheduled to December 15–18, 2013 on a home-and-away format. All times are Philippine Standard Time (PST) – UTC+8.

15 December 2013	Global	4 – 0	Flame United	Panaad Stadium, Bacolod
	R.Sanchez 31'; A.Guirado 58'; M.A.Hartmann 67', 70'

15 December 2013	Ceres	5 – 1	BSU	Panaad Stadium, Bacolod
	J.Baguioro 7', 25'; Oladipo 49', 85'; Panhay 51'		R.Basilio 15'

17 December 2013	Flame United	0 – 5	Global	Panaad Stadium, Bacolod
			I.Ehabbib 28'; Starosta 41'; A.Guirado 57'; R.Sanchez 71', 73'

17 December 2013	BSU	0 – 11	Ceres	Panaad Stadium, Bacolod

=== Finals ===
Date is scheduled to December 19–21, 2013 on a home-and-away format. All times are Philippine Standard Time (PST) – UTC+8.

19 December 2013	Ceres	2 – 1	Global	Bacolod
15:00	Panhay 45'; Beloya 62'		A. Guirado 54'	Stadium: Panaad Stadium

21 December 2013	Global	0 – 1	Ceres	Bacolod
15:00			J.Baguioro 83'	Stadium: Panaad Stadium
