= 2013 PFF National Men's U-23 Championship =

Tournament details
- Country: Philippines
- Dates: May 17–30, 2013
- Teams: 9

Final positions
- Champions: Negros Occidental
- Runners-up: Davao

Tournament statistics
- Matches played: 20
- Goals scored: 48 (2.4 per match)
- Top goal scorer(s): Joshua Beloya; Rudane Tamon; Juven Benitez (4 goals)

The 2013 PFF National Men's U-23 Championship (known as the PFF-Suzuki U-23 Championship for sponsorship reasons) is the second edition of a football tournament in the Philippines organized by the Philippine Football Federation (PFF) and Japanese automaker Suzuki. It is the national competition of Men's Under-23 players representing the member associations of Philippine Football Federation.

== Host ==
On March 19, it was reported that the Final Qualifying Round will be held at Perdices Stadium in Dumaguete.

After a month-long delay, the regional qualifying and semi-final rounds of the 2013 PFF Suzuki Under 23 Championship resumed on May 17 until May 28 in Dumaguete. The one-game finals showdown played on May 30 at 2:30 pm in the same venue.

== Schedule ==
- May 17 to 26, 2013 - Final Qualifying Round - Dumaguete
- May 28, 2013 - Semi-finals - Dumaguete
- May 30, 2013 - Finals - Dumaguete

== Groups ==
=== Group A ===
- Matches to be played at Perdices Memorial Coliseum in Dumaguete, on 17–26 May 2013 (all times UTC+8).

Team	Pld	W	D	L	GF	GA	GD	Pts
North Cotabato	4	3	0	1	8	4	+4	9
Iloilo	4	3	0	1	3	2	+1	9
Cebu	4	2	1	1	3	2	+1	7
Baguio-Benguet	4	0	2	2	4	6	−2	2
Iligan-Lanao Del Norte	4	0	1	3	2	6	−4	1

=== Group B ===
- Matches to be played at Perdices Memorial Coliseum in Dumaguete, on 17–26 May 2013 (all times UTC+8).

Team	Pld	W	D	L	GF	GA	GD	Pts
Negros Occidental	3	3	0	0	14	0	+14	9
Davao	3	2	0	1	4	5	−1	6
Zamboanga-Dipolog	3	1	0	2	2	10	−8	3
Masbate	3	0	0	3	1	6	−5	0

=== Knockout stage ===
Semi-Finals
A1	North Cotabato	0
B2	Davao	1
B1	NOFA	2
A2	Iloilo	0

Finals
Davao	0
NOFA	1

==== Semi-finals ====
28 May 2013
08:30 UTC+8

North Cotabato	0 – 1	Davao
		Abalunan 90+5'

Perdices Memorial Coliseum, Dumaguete
28 May 2013
14:30 UTC+8

NOFA	2 – 0	Iloilo
Ariola 50'; Beloya 70'

Perdices Memorial Coliseum, Dumaguete

==== Third-place Playoff ====
30 May 2013
08:30 UTC+8

North Cotabato	3 – 0	Iloilo

Perdices Memorial Coliseum, Dumaguete

==== Finals ====
30 May 2013
14:30 UTC+8

Davao	0 – 1	NOFA
		Valmayor 81'

Perdices Memorial Coliseum, Dumaguete

=== Awards ===
The following were the competition’s top individual awardees.

- Golden Boot Awards: Joshua Beloya (NOFA), Rudane Tamon (North Cotabato) and Juven Benitez (North Cotabato)
- Most Valuable Player: Joshua Beloya (NOFA)
- Best Defender: Anthony Tongson (NOFA)
- Best Goalkeeper: Dominador Tato (Davao)
- Best Midfielder: Joshua Beloya (NOFA)
- Fair Play Award: Davao
