= Norman Fegidero =

Filipino association football manager and former player (born 1970)

Personal information
- Full name: Norman Salo Fegidero Jr.
- Date of birth: January 28, 1970 (age 56)
- Place of birth: Bacolod, Philippines
- Position: Midfielder

College career
Years	Team	Apps	(Gls)
- West Negros University

Senior career*
Years	Team	Apps	(Gls)
–	Philippine Air Force		

International career
1989–2001	Philippines	29	(6)

Managerial career
- 2008: Philippines
- 2011–2012: Pachanga
- –: La Salle
- 2022: Philippines U23
- 2022: ADT
- 2024–2025: Philippines U23
- 2024: Philippines (interim)
- 2024–2025: Philippines (assistant)
- * Club domestic league appearances and goals

Norman Salo Fegidero Jr. (born January 28, 1970) is a Filipino football manager and former player. He represented the Philippines national team from 1989 to 2001 and later became their coach in 2008.

== College career ==
Fegidero played for the football team of West Negros University.

== Club career ==
At the club level, Fegidero played for Philippine Air Force. He played for the team which won the 1997 Manila Premier Football League.

Fegidero was part of the National Capital Region (NCR) B team that won the 1999 P-League. The team won 8–4 over Davao with Fegidero among the goal scorers. The NCR-B team had Philippine Air Force and Navy players.

== International career ==
For twelve years, from 1989 until 2001, Norman Fegidero played for the Philippines national team. The highlight of his career is when he was instrumental to the 1–0 upset against Malaysia at the 1991 Southeast Asian Games. He secured the winning goal in the 84th minute.

== Coaching career ==
=== Philippines ===
Fegidero was the head coach of the Philippines national team in 2008. He led the team in the 2008 AFC Challenge Cup qualifiers hosted in Iloilo. The Philippines won games against Bhutan and Brunei but failed to qualify for the competition proper after drawing Tajikistan in their final game.

=== Pachanga ===
From 2011 until 2012 Fegidero coached Pachanga. Under his watch, the United Football League Division 2 club would be undefeated in the 2012 season and earn promotion to the first division for the 2013 season.

=== University of St. La Salle ===
In December 2016, it was reported that Fegidero was serving as head coach of the under-21 team of La Salle.

=== Philippines U23 and ADT ===
In 2022, Fegidero was appointed head coach of the Philippines national U23 team which will compete at the 2021 Southeast Asian Games and the Azkals Development Team.

=== Philippines (interim) ===
Fegidero was brought in as an interim coach after Tom Saintfiet resigned shortly prior to the 2024 Merdeka Tournament.

== Career statistics ==
Scores and results list the Philippines' goal tally first.

Date	Venue	Opponent	Score	Result	Competition
November 26, 1991	Rizal Memorial Stadium, Manila, Philippines	Vietnam	?–?	2–2	1991 Southeast Asian Games
November 28, 1991	Rizal Memorial Stadium, Manila, Philippines	Malaysia	1–0	1–0	1991 Southeast Asian Games
October 9, 1997	Gelora Bung Karno Stadium, Jakarta, Indonesia	Laos	1–?	1–4	1997 Southeast Asian Games
March 26, 1998	Jurong Stadium, Singapore	Cambodia	1–1	1–1	1998 AFF Championship qualification
August 3, 1999	Berakas Sports Complex, Bandar Seri Begawan	Laos	1–0	2–3	1999 Southeast Asian Games
January 29, 2000	Thống Nhất Stadium, Ho Chi Minh City	Guam	1–0	2–0	2000 AFC Asian Cup qualification
