= P-League (Philippines) =

- Organizer(s): Philippine Football Federation; Silverstar Sports
- Founded: 1998
- Abolished: 2000
- Region: Philippines
- Teams: ~280 (inc. eliminations)
- Most championships: National Capital Region (2 titles; as NCR-South and NCR-B)
- Broadcaster: People's Television Network

The Philippine Football League, also known as the P-League, was a national championships of the Philippines in 1998 and 1999. It was organized by the Philippine Football Federation in cooperation with Silverstar Sports.

== History ==
The Philippine Football Federation and sponsor Silverstar Sports Communications launched the Philippine Football League (P-League) on February 23, 1998. They had a 10-year contract to stage of P-League.

Local eliminations has been played as early as January 1998, although the P-League was officially kicked off its first ever regional qualifiers, the Mindanao Cup on March 2 to 8. The inaugural champions are NCR which was represented by the Philippine Air Force.

The 1999 P-League eliminations saw 280 teams nationwide participate. The final tournament was held in Dumaguete, Negros Oriental. National Capital Region-B composed of Philippine Air Force and Philippine Navy players won the second P-League title. They defeated Davao with the shoreline of 8–4.

The P-League on its third year in 2000 was cancelled due to security issues in a venue.

== Format ==
A mix of provincial teams, university teams and clubs take part in regional tournaments covering Metro Manila, the rest of Luzon, Visayas, and Mindanao. The qualifying teams play in a final tournament which were organized in the rural areas due to a lack of demand in Metro Manila.

== Winners ==
Season	National finals host	Final			Playoff			Ref.
Season	National finals host	Champions	Score	Runners-up	Third place	Score	Fourth place	Ref.
1998	Bacolod	NCR–South (Note: Represented by Philippine Air Force)	3–1	Negros Occidental	NCR–North (Note: Represented by the Ateneo Blue Eagles under the name "Team ERAP")	No information	Negros Oriental	
1999	Dumaguete	NCR–B (Note: Represented by a combine of the Philippine Air Force and Philippine Navy)	8–4	Davao	Negros Occidental	4–2	Negros Oriental	

== Teams ==
=== Regional qualifiers ===
NCR	Luzon	Visayas	Mindanao
Ateneo Blue Eagles (1998); Letran Knights (1998); Nomads (1998); Philippine Air Force (1998, 1999); UST Glowing Goldies (1998)	Bacolod (1999); Cebu (1999); Dumaguete (1998, 1999); Iloilo (1999)	Baguio (1999); Laguna (1999); Legaspi (1999); Palawan (1999)	Cagayan de Oro (1998, 1999); Davao (1998, 1999); Iligan (1998, 1999); Pagadian (1999); South Cotabato (1999); Zamboanga (1998, 1999)

=== National finals ===
- Cotabato
- Iligan
- Laguna
- National Capital Region (Note: Has been represented by two teams in each national finals)
- Negros Occidental
- Negros Oriental
