= Manila Premier Football League =

- First season: 1997
- Folded: 1997
- Country: Philippines
- Number of clubs: 8
- Level on pyramid: 1
- Relegation to: None
- Last champions: Philippine Air Force (1 title) (1997)
- Broadcaster(s): IBC

The Manila Premier Football League (MPFL) was a semi-professional football league in the Philippines. The only edition of then de-facto top-level league in the country was held in 1997.

The tournament was organized by the National Capital Region F.A. and the Main Events Creative Leisure Services and was sanctioned by the Philippine Football Federation.

== History ==
The conduct of semi-professional football was largely stopped after 1995 due to organizational and financial constraints. Tournaments were previously held under a home-and-away format by the Philippine Football Federation (PFF).

From 1995, there was a lack of PFF-sanctioned tournaments. The PFF under the administration of president Lope Pascual started attempting to establish a semi-professional league. However they experienced difficulty in holding games in the rural areas for the PFF's league. Pascual eventually left the PFF. By early 1996, the process of setting up a semi-professional league continued under president Ricardo Tan. In October 1997, Tan was removed from the presidency with Rene Adad taking over resetting the progress on the league establishment.

The Manila Premier Football League was then launched in 1997. In preparation for the 1997 season. The Rizal Memorial Stadium in Manila was renovated in cooperation with the Philippine Sports Commission, the National Capital Region F.A., and Main Events Creative Leisure Services. Chris Monfort was the commissioner of the MPFL.

The league kicked off on July 19, 2000. Pop bands Put3ska and Rizal Underground performed at the opening ceremony. Philippine Air Force won the title for the only edition of the MPFL held.

== Teams ==
| Club | Mascot | Head coach |
|---|---|---|
| Alabang United | Stallions | Albert Lim |
| España United | Tiger | Noel Casilao |
| Loyola | Falcon | |
| Mendiola United | Lion | |
| Philippine Army | Carabao | |
| Philippine Air Force | Eagle | |
| Philippine Navy | Dolphin | Feliciano Angue |
| Taft | Black Panther | Orlando Plagata |

== Venues ==
There are two venues used for the league. The Rizal Memorial Stadium in Manila and the PSC–NAS Field in Pasig.

== 1997 season ==
=== Draft ===
A draft was held for the 1997 MPFL on June 7, 1997 at the Shangri-La Plaza in Mandaluyong, Metro Manila. Ver Velasco was selected as top pick by Orlando Plagata-coached Taft FC. The three Armed Forces of the Philippines clubs did not participate.

First round

| Pick | Player | Pos. | Team | College/University |
|---|---|---|---|---|
| 1 | Ver Velasco | GK | Taft | University of the Philippines |
| 2 | John Carmona | MF | España United | De La Salle University |
| 3 | Rene Grapilon | | Loyola | Ateneo de Manila University |
| 4 | Lloyd Lim | | Alabang United | University of the East |
| 5 | Francis Abijay | | Loyola | De La Salle University |
| 6 | Randy Belaong | | Mendiola United | University of the Philippines |

=== Format ===
The elimination round featuring the eight participating teams was held. The top four teams advanced to the semifinals. The semifinals was held on October 26 while the final was scheduled on November 15.

=== Results ===
==== Elimination round ====
| Team | Pld | W | D | L | Qualification |
|---|---|---|---|---|---|
| Philippine Army | 8 | 4 | 2 | 1 | Semifinals |
| Philippine Air Force | 8 | 4 | 2 | 1 | Semifinals |
| Philippine Navy | 8 | 4 | 2 | 1 | Semifinals |
| España United | No information | | | | Semifinals |
| Alabang United; Loyola; Mendiola United; Taft | No information | | | | |

==== Semifinals ====
October 26, 1997

| Philippine Army | 2–0 | España United |
|---|---|---|
| Morata 60', 75' | Report |

Rizal Memorial Stadium, Manila
October 26, 1997

| Philippine Air Force | 3–1 | Philippine Navy |
|---|---|---|
| Tioco 14'; Piao 24' | Report | ? |

Rizal Memorial Stadium, Manila

==== Final ====
November 15, 1997

| Philippine Army | v | Philippine Air Force |

Rizal Memorial Stadium, Manila
Philippine Air Force won the title
