= Philippine Army F.C. =

Philippine Army
- Full name: Philippine Army Football Club
- Nickname: The Troopers
- Short name: PAFC
- Founded: 1960; 66 years ago
- Ground: Various
- Owner: Philippine Army
- President: Maj. CJ Paolo P. Pérez
- Head coach: Nestorio Margarse Jr.
- League: Philippines Football League
- 2025–26: Philippines Football League, 11th of 11
Home colours	Away colours	Third colours

Philippine Army Football Club is a football section of the Philippine Army. It was founded in 1960 through the effort of the Special Services Unit that promotes sports and physical fitness within the army. The club plays in the Philippines Football League, the top-flight league of football in the Philippines.

== History ==
In 2003, the club participated in the inaugural edition of the ASEAN Club Championship held in Jakarta, Indonesia, where they did not advance past the group stage against Indian club Kingfisher East Bengal and Thai club BEC Tero Sasana.

Philippine Army FC's starting 11 during their ASEAN Club Championship campaign in 2003

Philippine Army participated in the sole season of the Filipino Premier League in 2008, winning over Giligans in the league final match.

=== United Football League ===
Philippine Army played in the now-defunct United Football League, which was the de facto top-tier league in the Philippines. Initially the club was among the top teams in the league, finishing third in the 2011 season. They finished 9th in the following two seasons in. The club avoided relegation by winning against Union Internacional Manila in the playoff.

Football crest as Philippine Army GTI (2014 UFL).

For the 2014 UFL season, Philippine Army had a temporary merger with General Trias International and the military squad was bolstered by Korean players. The move was done due to difficulties in scheduling the training of its players, enlisted soldiers often called into duty. The team played as Philippine Army GTI for that season.

At the latter part of the 2015 season, Philippine Army was disqualified from the United Football League including any related competitions.

=== Philippines Football League ===
Philippine Army announced return for the 2023 Copa Paulino Alcantara. In 2024, They make their debut in the top-flight league, the Philippines Football League after confirming its participation in February 2024. Philippine Army played their first ever top-flight league match on 6 April 2024 in a 3–2 lost against Manila Diggers.

== Players criteria ==
As a football club under the Armed Forces of the Philippines like the Philippine Navy and the Philippine Air Force. Philippine Army can only sign players who are also enlisted in the Philippine Army. Though for the 2014 season the squad included non-Army enlistees with the temporary merger of the club with General Trias International.

The club had players who has played for the Philippines national team such as Roel Gener, Nestorio Margarse, and Eduard Sacapaño.

== Former players ==
- (Philippines) Lurix Araneta
- (Philippines) Rey Saluria
- (Philippines) Jesus Baron
- (Philippines) Judy Saluria
- (Philippines) Jeoffrey Lobaton
- (Philippines) Wilson Dela Cruz
- (Philippines) Billy Estrella
- (Philippines) Roel Gener
- (Philippines) Luisito Brillantes
- (Philippines) Eduard Sacapaño

== Honors ==
=== Domestic competitions ===
- Philippines National Championship

- Winners (2): 1992, 2001

- Filipino Premier League Luzon Tournament

- Winners (1): 2008

- UFL Cup

- Runners-up (1): 2009

- Manila Premier Football League

- Runners-up (1): 1997

== Records ==
Season	Division	Tms.	Pos.	National Cup	NCRFA Tournaments	Monfort Cup	PFF NMCC	UFL Cup	AFC PC	ACC
1960s	Not known			—	—	—	—	—	—	—
1970/71	2	18	1st	—	—	—	—	—	—	—
1972–1979	Not known			—	—	—	—	—	—	—
1980	1	9	8th	—	—	—	—	—	—	—
1981/83	Not known			—	—	—	—	—	—	—
1984	Not known			—	1st	—	—	—	—	—
1985/91	Not known			—	—	—	—	—	—	—
1992	No national league			1st	—	—	—	—	—	—
1993–1994	No national league			—	—	—	—	—	—	—
1995	1	10	Not known	—	—	2nd	—	—	—	—
1996	No national league			—	—	2nd	—	—	—	—
1997	1	7	Not known	3rd	—	—	—	—	—	—
1998	No national league			—	—	1st	—	—	—	—
1999	1	15	3rd	—	—	—	—	—	—	—
2000	No national league			—	1st	—	—	—	—	—
2001	No national league			1st	—	—	—	—	—	—
2002	No national league			—	—	—	—	—	—	—
2003	No national league			—	—	—	—	—	—	Group stage
2004	No national league			—	—	1st	—	—	—	—
2005	No national league			3rd	—	—	—	—	—	—
2006–2007	No national league			—	—	—	—	—	—	—
2008	1	8	1st	—	—	—	—	—	—	—
2009	No national league			—	—	—	—	2nd	—	—
2010	1	8	5th	—	—	—	—	Semi-finals	—	—
2011	1	7	3rd	—	—	—	—	Round of 16	—	—
2012	1	10	9th	—	—	—	—	Quarter-finals	—	—
2013	1	10	9th	—	—	—	Round of 16	Group stage	DNQ	—
2014	1	9	7th	—	—	—	—	—	DNQ	—
2015	1	10	10th (DQ)	—	—	—	—	—	—	—
2016–2017	Did not participate			—	—	—	—	—	—	—
2018	Did not participate			—	4th	—	—	—	—	—
2019	Did not participate			—	—	—	—	—	—	—
2020	Did not participate			—	—	—	—	—	—	—
2021-2022	Did not participate			—	—	—	—	—	—	—
2023	Did not participate			Group Stage	—	—	—	—	—	—
2024	1	15	14th	—	—	—	—	—	—	—
2024-2025	Did not participate			—	—	—	—	—	—	—
2025–26	1	25	11th	—	—	—	—	—	—	—

Key

- Tms. = Number of teams
- Pos. = Position in league
- TBD = To be determined
- DNQ = Did not qualify

Note: Performances of the club indicated here was after the UFL Division 1 is created in 2009.

== Continental record ==
Season	Competition	Round	Club	Score	Agg. / Pos.
2003	ASEAN Club Championship	Group stage	(India) Kingfisher East Bengal	0–6	Group D (3rd)
2003	ASEAN Club Championship	Group stage	(Thailand) BEC Tero Sasana	0–3	Group D (3rd)

== See also ==
- Philippine Air Force
- Philippine Navy
