= Football in the Philippines =

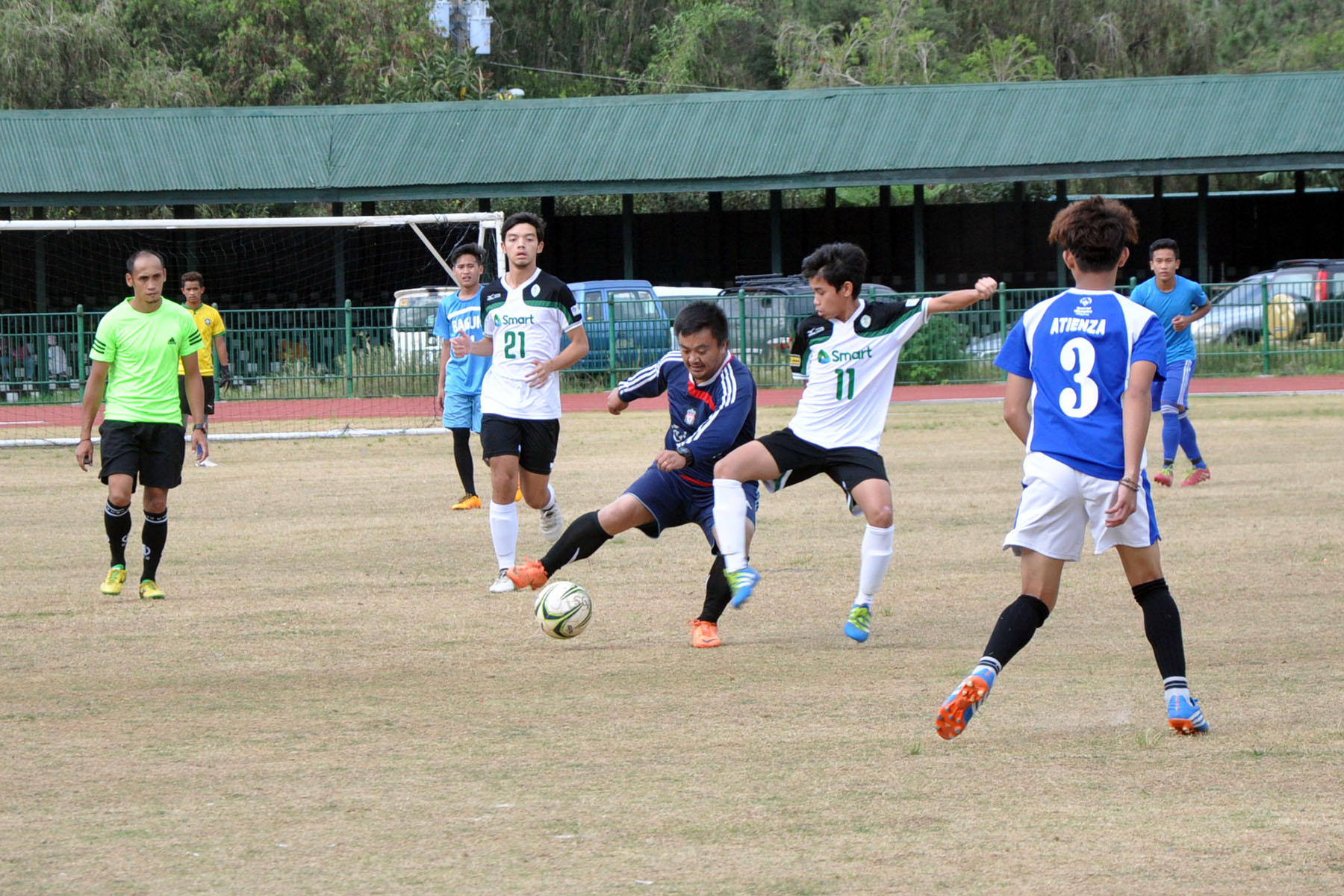
- Filipino youths playing football at the Baguio Athletic Bowl.
- Country: Philippines
- Governing body: Philippine Football Federation
- National team: Men's national team Women's national team

National competitions
- Copa Paulino Alcántara

Club competitions
- Philippines Football League; PFF Women's League; Philippine Futsal League; PFF Women's Cup; 7's Football League; PFF U19 Boys National Championship

International competitions
- Club: AFC Champions League Two; AFC Challenge League; AFC Women's Champions League; National team: FIFA World Cup; FIFA Women's World Cup; FIFA Beach Soccer World Cup; AFC Asian Cup; AFC Women's Asian Cup; AFC Beach Soccer Asian Cup; AFF Championship; AFF Women's Championship; AFF Beach Soccer Championship

Football in the Philippines is administered by the Philippine Football Federation (PFF), the governing body of football in the country. Around 40 million people in the Philippines, or 35 percent of the population, are football fans.

Football in the Philippines is a sport played at professional and amateur levels across the country. Football has a long and rich history in the islands, dating back to the 1890s, when the British introduced the sport to the Spanish and European settlers living on the islands. The Philippine Football Federation was established in 1907 and it would soon feature several Hispanic Filipino sportsmen that included FC Barcelona, Real Madrid, Real Sociedad, Atlético Madrid and Real Zaragoza legends such as Manuel Amechazurra, Paulino Alcántara, Juan Torena, Eduardo Teus, Marcelino Gálatas and Gregorio Querejeta, who would eventually become the first Filipinos and Asian footballers to play for a professional European club in Spain. Amechazurra was the first to achieve great heights at Spanish football, playing for FC Barcelona and he was followed by Alcántara later on, after also achieving success with the same football club. Alcántara went on to become the youngest Filipino footballer to play in Spain, where he made his professional debut as a striker at the age of 15 for Barcelona, which made him the club's youngest and second highest goal scorer behind Argentinian footballer, Lionel Messi. Since then, the first football teams began to form, including the Manila Sporting Club in 1906, the Sandow Athletic Club in 1909, and the Bohemian Sporting Club in 1910.

To promote and revive the sport, some European and American international football clubs and organizations have helped the Philippines progress through its development, they have included FC Barcelona and Real Madrid from Spain, the United Kingdom, Germany, Sweden, Australia, France, the United States, Argentina and Serbia. FIFA also assisted the country by building and upgrading facilities including the creation of the Philippine Football Federation (PFF) headquarters in 2009. As well, the establishment of the United Football League (UFL) and the National Men's Club Championship to provide more local competitions.

The Philippines national football team is the representative of men's international football for the Philippines. They won the Far Eastern Games once (in 1913) and became a two-time Philippine Peace Cup champion (in 2012 and 2013).

The Philippines women's national football team, known as the Filipinas, achieved a historic milestone by qualifying for the 2023 FIFA Women's World Cup, becoming the first Philippine team, male or female, to reach a senior FIFA World Cup. The Filipinas recorded their first World Cup victory by defeating host nation New Zealand in the group stage. The achievement contributed to increased recognition and support for football in the Philippines.

There are many stadiums that can be found in the Philippines, like the Rizal Memorial Stadium in Manila, which is the national stadium of the country. It is also the home stadium of the Philippine football team. Meanwhile, the Panaad Stadium in Bacolod is the secondary venue for the Philippines.

== History ==
=== 1890s-1940s ===
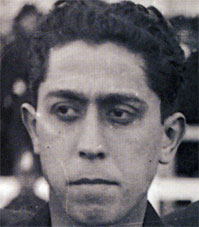
Football legend and FC Barcelona superstar, Paulino Alcántara

In 1895, (Note: Three years before the Americans fought the Spaniards in Manila Bay.) football was introduced in the Philippines by British sportsmen visiting the islands. In addition, some Filipinos sent to college in Hong Kong and China returned home and taught their friends a little bit about the game of football. Within a year, there were two or three football clubs established in Manila. While in Spain, Filipino sportsmen had played a significant role in the early development and success of Spanish football.

In 1898, after a number of wars have broken out on the islands, all football organizations were briefly postponed. The United States had invaded Cuba and then the Philippines during that period. After the ship sank resulting in significant casualties, the Americans declared war against Spain which led to the Spanish–American War. This ended the Spanish governance in the Philippines and Cuba, and was replaced by the United States.

When the war broke out, all football teams disbanded and abandoned the city, either to save themselves and their families from the conflict. After the war, and the restoration of peace in the regions of Luzon, six football teams were formed, among them the Manila Sporting Club, the Paris Club, and the Manila Jockey Club. In 1906, the Sandow football team was established (further developed as Sandow Athletic Club in 1909).

On 15 October 1907, the first official football match was held in Manila, with the celebration of the opening of the Philippine Assembly. The trophy, a silver cup donated by 27th President of the United States William Howard Taft, was won by the Sandow Athletic Club. Soon, more clubs were formed. In 1910, the Bohemian Sporting Club was organized and began to train football players. In 1920, the Circulo Social Deportivo was established and produced a football team. To further propagate the love of the sport and to regulate soccer championship contests, all football teams within the city banded themselves together and organized the Philippine Amateur Football Association in 1907 (now the Philippine Football Federation), and held its first championship in 1921 with Bohemian Sporting Club as champions.

In 1906, Manuel Amechazurra became the first Filipino and Asian player to play for a European football club. He was signed at FC Barcelona as a defender, and soon made an impact helping Barcelona win the Spanish championship title in 1908. Four years later, Paulino Alcántara became the second Filipino footballer to play for a European club. Alcántara made his debut for Barcelona at the age of 15 against Català Sporting Club, where he scored his first hat-trick. (Note: The term "hat-trick" is used when a player scored three goals in a game.) Alcántara remains the youngest player to play or score for the club. He scored 395 goals in 399 matches, making him the second club's highest goalscorer (counting goals scored in both official games and friendlies) with Lionel Messi ranking first in the record. In 1917, he was selected by the Philippines to represent the country at the Far Eastern Championship Games in Tokyo, helping them defeat Japan 15–2, which remains the largest win in Philippine international football history. Alcántara only played once for the Philippines that finished second in the tournament. (Note: The second match was abandoned after China converted a penalty kick that marked the score 4–0 which later the Philippines goalkeeper punched the Chinese scorer and fighting ensued, lead in to the withdrawal of the Philippines.) He also made some appearances in other national teams, including Catalonia and Spain. In 1916, while continuing his studies in medicine, he played football for a local team, the Bohemian Sporting Club, whom he helped win two Philippine Championships in 1917 and 1918.

In the 1930s, Gregorio Querejeta became the first Filipino to play in the La Liga in Spain, where he appeared in over 122 matches for Real Zaragoza, Atlético Madrid and Gimnàstic de Tarragona.

The popularity of "The Beautiful Game" (Note: The Beautiful Game is a nickname for association football. The origin or individual who coined the phrase is unknown but football commentator Stuart Hall is the only individual to have claimed to have coined "The Beautiful Game".) did not decrease in participation when the Americans founded basketball in the Philippines in 1910 as part of the physical education curriculum in Philippine schools. Two surveys were conducted in parts of Metro Manila in 2012—the first found that basketball is the most-watched sport at 74.4%, and football is fourth at 17.9%. (Note: First, basketball at 74.4%. Second, boxing at 62%. Third, volleyball at 22.9%. Fourth, association football at 17.9%. Fifth, swimming at 17.2%.) In the second survey, basketball was found to be the most-played sport during leisure time at 9.6%, while association football did not make the list. (Note: First, basketball at 9.6%. Second, badminton at 3.2%. Third, swimming and aerobics at 1.8%. Fifth, volleyball at 1.6%. Association football did not mention in the list.)

=== 1950s-1970s ===
Football saw some rise in the fifties where the country saw enthusiasm for the sport built through the football teams of top educational institutions such as the Ateneo, Letran, La Salle, San Beda, San Carlos, UST, Silliman, and the University of Visayas.

The Philippine Football Association partnered with San Miguel Brewery to seek foreign assistance in developing football in the country. In the early sixties, British coaches Alan Rogers and Brian Birch were brought in and funded by San Miguel to train referees, coaches and players in the country. Due to lack of facilities, the two coaches organized a five-a-side football competition which was played in a field with the same size of a basketball court. The two were later relieved and Danny McClellan and Graham Adams were tasked train national and youth players.

San Miguel through the Philippine Football Association, brought in Spanish medical students who were knowledgeable in football in 1961. Association president, Felipe Monserrat, tasked the Spaniards to garner interest in football in the country and to train local players. The composition of the Spanish quarter were: Francisco Escarte, Enrique dela Mata, Claudio Sanchez, and Juan Cutillas, with the former two leaving after a year. The group was then followed by, Peter Leaver from the United Kingdom who focused on developing school football and assisted schools such as Ateneo and La Salle. Philippine football also received promotional support from the Elizalde Company.

In 1971 Juan Cutillas, selected four Spanish players and one Chinese in an effort to boost the Philippine national team. The national team joined the tournaments such as the Pestabola Merdeka, Pesta Sukan, Jakarta Anniversary Tournament, and the President Park Tournament. The Philippines managed to cause upsets results against Thailand, Singapore, and South Korea. When the Spanish players, Tomas Lozano, Mannuel Cuenca, Juan Guitierrez, and Julio Roxas left the football team due to financial reasons, football in the country saw another decline and basketball gained foothold in the country.

=== 2000s and the Revival ===
==== Support from international countries and clubs ====
There have been four projects accepted by the Fédération Internationale de Football Association (FIFA), (Note: In English, International Federation of Association Football.) to build and upgrade football facilities in the Philippines. In the first project, approved in August 2000, FIFA built six technical centers on Iloilo, Laguna, Negros Occidental, Cagayan de Oro, Zamboanga, and Agusan del Sur, with a total budget of ₱ 458,046 (≈€ 7,500 or ≈$ 10,000). The next project, in December 2006, constructed the headquarters of the PFF in Pasig. Its third project was to upgrade the pitch in the Rizal Memorial Stadium to an artificial turf from August to September 2012, but it was discontinued because Philippine Football Federation President Mariano Araneta said that conducting the 2012 Philippine Peace Cup in Manila would lessen the expenses of the PFF in the event. FIFA's final project was to build a technical center in Bukidnon, which includes a natural grass pitch, dormitories, changing rooms, lecture rooms and offices.

A number of foreign countries and clubs have offered to help promote and popularise the sport within the country. In 2010, the German Football Association (DFB) recommended the services of former Rwanda U-17 coach Michael Weiß as coach of the "Azkals", a nickname for the national team, after Dan Palami's three-day visit in Frankfurt. The DFB gave the Philippine Football Federation a grant of € 500,000 (≈₱ 31 million or ≈$ 11,000). However, after three years as a head coach, Weiß was no longer part of the Azkals after the PFF's year-end evaluation.

On 18 October 2011, officials from the Real Madrid Foundation visited the Philippines to sign an agreement with local non-governmental organizations (NGO) to open a social and sports academy for youths in Mindanao to 70 poor children with under age 14. On 15 May 2012, English club Chelsea was joined by international development manager Ian Woodroffe, and Adrian New, managing director for Asia, arrived in the country to formally launch a football school at the SM Mall of Asia. It is the third football school created by Chelsea in Asia, after two others in Hong Kong and Kuala Lumpur. The school is operated by Phil Younghusband and James Younghusband, brothers and former members of Chelsea's Reserves and Youth Team. After a year, Smart Communications sponsored the soccer school through its partnership with the Younghusband Football Academy (TYFA) to visit schools throughout the Philippines in conjunction with Smart's program. Soon after its establishment, they built an artificial grass football field named as Gatorade-Chelsea Blue Pitch in Ayala Alabang. The opening ceremonies was joined with Ayala Corporation president, Fernando Zobel de Ayala, Makati mayor Jun Binay and Makati representative Monique Lagdameo last 15 January 2014. The venue has a dimension of 64.5 by 100 metres (212 by 328 ft) and it is set to be the new facility for the school.

Another Spanish club, Barcelona, conducted a camp in Muntinlupa named "Barcelona Escola Camp 2013". It began on 17 April and ended on 21 April 2013. Two coaches from Barcelona Escola, Joseph Moratalla and Jordi Blanco, came to the Philippines. The camp was organized by Team Socceroo. A second camp was scheduled on 18 to 22 December 2013, held in Emperador Stadium, Taguig. Coaches from the camp shared their training, philosophy, methodology, and values with the children.

After the destruction of Typhoon Haiyan in the country, FIFA gave the PFF $ 1 million to rebuild and rehabilitate damaged football facilities. Leyte Football Association President Dan Palami and other football officials are planning to construct a training center in Tacloban from the grant FIFA gave.

On 3 December 2011, the Philippines faced U.S. club LA Galaxy as a part of their Asia-Pacific Tour in the Rizal Memorial Stadium, which Galaxy won 6–1.

Manchester United with its sponsor, a shampoo brand Clear made a "multi-year partnership" as they will hold training camps facilitated by coaches in the sport. The Manchester United Soccer School will teach 32 amateur footballers in an "intense and rigorous" program. Tryouts were held in March 2014.

==== Development of international and local competitions ====
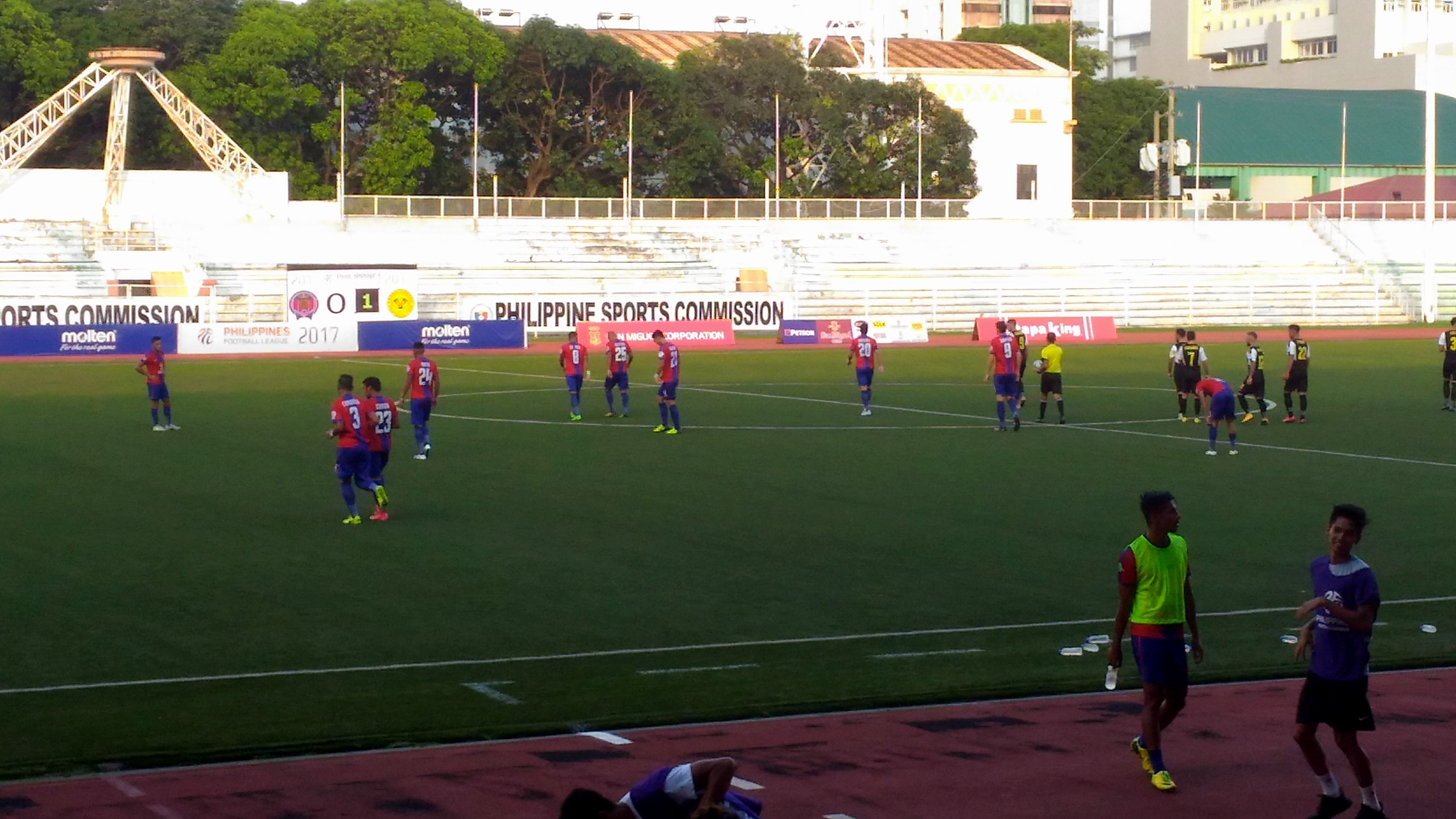
2017 PFL match

In 2008, the Filipino Premier League (FPL) was established as the top-flight competition in the Philippines. It featured eight clubs from the National Capital Region. The PFF also planned a Visayas and Mindanao FPL tournament in 2009, which never materialized. The first and only champion of the league, which was cancelled at the season's conclusion, was the Philippine Army.

Shortly after the dissolution of the Filipino Premier League, the Football Alliance sought to renew the interest of Filipinos in football. The Alliance entered into discussions with the United Football Clubs Association for the possibility of establishing another top-flight football competition in the Philippines. Instead of creating a whole system and competition, the United Football Clubs Association agreed to partner with the Football Alliance in operating the United Football League (UFL), a semi-professional league. After the league's second season, AKTV became its official TV broadcaster with the signing of a ₱ 150 million (~$3.3 million or ~€2.5 million), five-year deal, which ensures the airing of two live matches every week. The deal was further improved with a new TV arrangement in which four live matches would be aired every week on primetime television on AksyonTV.

On 21 April 2017, the Philippines Football League (PFL) was launched as the first professional football league and the highest level of men's club football in the country. The league is sanctioned by the Philippine Football Federation, and replaced the United Football League which was previously the de facto top-tier league. Unlike the UFL, teams joining the PFL will be representing cities and provinces, as well as, have their own certified home stadiums and youth teams. Six of the eight teams joining the inaugural season came from the UFL, namely Ceres–Negros, Global Cebu, JPV Marikina, Kaya FC–Makati, Loyola Meralco Sparks, and Stallion Laguna. Two new teams Davao Aguilas, and Ilocos United were formed to join the new league.

The Philippine Football Federation has not been able to organize a national tournament since 2007, when they staged the PFF Centennial Men's Open Championship due to "variety of reasons". In January 2011, Smart Communications approached the PFF with an offer to finance a new local football cup competition, the PFF National Men's Club Championship. The proposed partnership was set to last 10 years, with Smart releasing ₱ 80 million in funds with the aim of providing more playing opportunities for football players, and the eventual creation of a national cup. In March 2011, the first season of the cup began.

Since 2012, the Chinese Taipei Football Association (CTFA) requested if the PFF can host the third staging of the Long Teng Cup in the Philippines. It was then accepted, the Philippines which has been a regular participant since its inception in 2010, renamed the tournament the Paulino Alcántara Cup, then renamed it once again to the Paulino Alcántara Peace Cup. The tournament was eventually renamed the Philippine Peace Cup because the Philippine Sports Commission, which operates the Rizal Memorial Stadium where the tournament was held, has a rule against events named after an individual. The tournament takes place in September to celebrate Peace Month in the Philippines.

==== National team performance ====
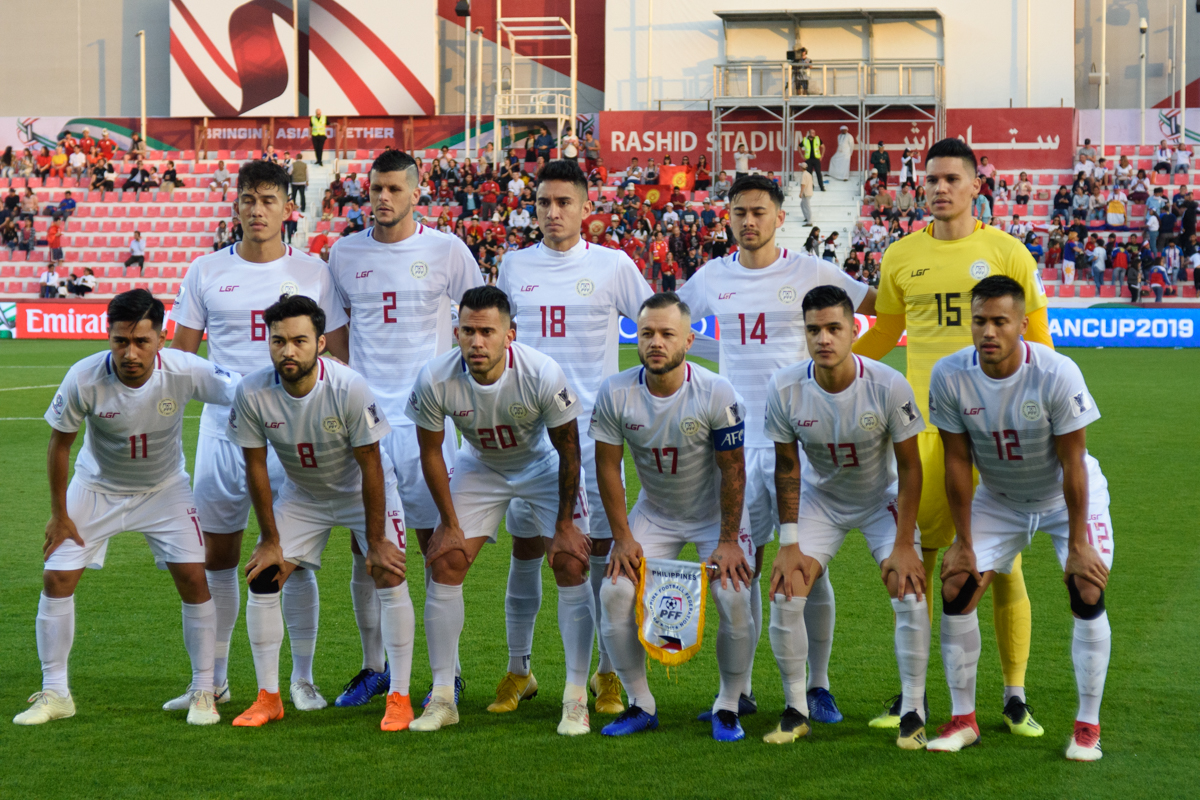
The national men's team at the 2019 Asian Cup.

The inaugural season of the Far Eastern Games (FEG) in 1913 was the first championship held in Manila. The tournament provided the first matches in international football for all three nations, including the Republic of China and Japan. (Note: Japan made their debut in international football when they were invited at the 1917 Far Eastern Games.) In the same season, the Philippines (Note: The Philippines was represented by champions Bohemian Sporting Club with players consisting of Britons, Spanish and Americans which was against the official rules of the tournament. Nevertheless, they were awarded the champions of this year's edition.) clinched their first championship title in international soccer when they defeated China 2–1. They also competed in 1915 in Shanghai, where the Chinese grabbed their first FEG title against the Filipinos. (Note: China was represented by South China AA.) The Philippine team has competed in every Far Eastern Games, but has not yet won another tournament since 1913. In 1938, the FEG was cancelled due to the outbreak of the Second Sino-Japanese War.

The Philippine team competed in the Asian Games numerous times, making their debut in 1954 when the Philippines hosted the tournament. The Filipinos were in Group A with South Vietnam and Chinese Taipei. All games was held in Rizal Memorial Stadium. Their matches were both losses, resulting in early elimination. They returned in 1958 in Tokyo, this time competing in Group C. The Azkals recorded their first win at the games over Japan, but eventually lost to Hong Kong. In 1962, the Asian Games were held in Jakarta. Chinese Taipei and Israel were excluded in the tournament when the Indonesian government refused to issue visas for the Israeli and Taiwanese delegations. Meanwhile, Burma withdrew from competition. The Philippine team finished last in the standings, behind South Vietnam, Indonesia, and Malaya. The team finished last again in 1974 after losing every game. Beginning in 2002, an age division of under-23 was approved for men, which is the same as in football competitions in the Olympic Games. The Philippines U-23 has never yet made an appearance at the Asian Games since 2002.

The Philippine team has participated in minor tournaments such as the Merdeka Tournament in 1962, 1971 and 1972, where each was finished in the group stages.

The Philippines have qualified for the AFC Asian Cup for the first time in 2019. They have also played at the AFC Challenge Cup, which formerly served as a qualifier for the Asian Cup prior to 2019. (Note: After the inception of the AFC Challenge Cup, new changes in AFC Competition rules were made. Countries categorized as "emerging nations" which include the Philippines, do not enter Asian Cup qualification starting with the 2011 edition. Therefore, failure to qualify and failure to win the Challenge Cup automatically results in failure to qualify for the Asian Cup.) They have made three appearances; in 2006, 2012, and 2014. The 2006 AFC Challenge Cup was the opening season of the competition, held in Bangladesh. The Philippines advanced automatically because there was no qualification stages. After competing in Group A, they concluded the standings with a loss over Chinese Taipei and two draws with India and Afghanistan. However, in the second season, they did not advance because of their performance at the qualification phase, finishing short at second place only by goal difference. Their first match was a victory over Brunei, followed by a goalless draw from Tajikistan and a 3–0 win against Bhutan. The conclusion was the same in the 2010 qualification stage, where they ended their campaign by finishing third.

The Philippine national team's campaign at the 2010 AFF Championship under head coach Simon McMenemy was seen as a success and played an important role in football in the country. The national team along with Laos had to qualify for the tournament. The Philippines advanced from the group stage for the first time in the history of the tournament. They did not concede a single defeat and their win against defending champions Vietnam in the group stage in particular was considered as one of the biggest upsets in the history of the tournament. The match, which would later be referred by local Filipino fans as the "Miracle of Hanoi", is also considered as the match that started a football renaissance in the country where basketball is the more popular sport. In the knockout stage, they had to play both their designated home and away games against Indonesia in Jakarta due to the unavailability of a stadium that passes AFF standards. The Philippines lost both games to end their campaign.

The following year, the Michael Weiß became the Philippines head coach. The Philippines has not made an appearance in the World Cup. However, the national team managed to qualify for the 2012 edition of the AFC Challenge Cup, the first time since qualifiers were introduced and also recorded their first ever victory in the FIFA World Cup qualification, beating Sri Lanka 4–0 in the second leg of the first preliminary round. Kuwait finished the Philippines' World Cup qualification campaign after winning over them twice in the second round.

The Filipinos grabbed their best finish in the cup when they were ranked third in the 2012 edition, with a loss from Turkmenistan in the semi-finals, and a victory against Palestine in the third place playoff.

In the national team's 2013 season, they capped off the year by finishing 127th in the FIFA World Rankings as their new all-time high.

The Philippines won two minor competitions, both in the Philippine Peace Cup. Since winning the 2012 Peace Cup, for the first time in 99 years, the national team earned their first international title after winning all of their games. Also in 2013, they retained the title after a win over Pakistan.

In late 2016 the Philippines jointly hosted the group stage of the 2016 AFF Championship with Myanmar though they fail to progress from the group stage like they did in the past three editions.

Though the national team failed to qualify for the 2018 FIFA World Cup in Russia, they secured qualification for 2019 AFC Asian Cup after defeating Tajikistan, 2–1 at home in their final qualifier match.

==== Women's national team success ====
The Philippines women's national football team made history by qualifying for the 2023 FIFA Women's World Cup held in Australia and New Zealand. This was the first time the Philippines competed in a senior FIFA World Cup. The Filipinas earned its first World Cup victory by defeating co-host New Zealand 1–0. The team's performance was praised internationally and helped reignite interest in football in the Philippines. The campaign is regarded as a significant moment in Philippine sports history.

== League system ==
=== Men's league ===
Level	League/Division
I	Philippines Football League; 10 clubs

The premier men's football league in the country is the Philippines Football League, which replaced the previous United Football League in late 2016. It officially launched on April 21, 2017, at the Shangri-La at the Fort in Taguig.

==== Competition format ====
The PFL followed a traditional home-and-away double round-robin format from the 2018 to 2019 seasons, although some clubs did not have their home stadiums at the time.

The 2020 season had all matches held in at a single venue due to the COVID-19 pandemic in the Philippines.

In the inaugural season of 2017, the league had two phases, the regular season, which adopted a home-and-away, double round-robin format, and the "Finals Series", a play-off round where the top four teams of the regular season played each other to determine the champions of the league. The Finals Series was not held for the succeeding seasons.

The league only had one division since its existence, but there are plans to introduce a second division as the league expands, with a system of promotion and relegation within the PFL to be put in place. There was a proposal to convert the former UFL to a second division tournament or a reserve league to the PFL.

The Copa Paulino Alcantara is the cup tournament of the PFL since the 2018 season.

==== Qualification for Asian competitions ====
The Champions of the PFL automatically qualify to compete in the group stages of the AFC Champions League. Meanwhile, the winners of the Copa Paulino Alcantara automatically qualify to compete in the group stages of the AFC Cup, though they also qualify for the preliminary round of the AFC Champions League play-offs.

History of Asian qualification

- AFC Champions League
  - 2017–2020: The league's champions qualify for the preliminary round of the play-offs, and they have to renounce to their slot in the AFC Cup in case of advancement to the group stage.
  - 2021–2023: The league's champions qualify directly for the group stage of the tournament; the winners of the Copa Paulino Alcantara (or the league's second placers, only for the 2020 season) qualify for the preliminary round of the play-offs, and they have to renounce slot in the AFC Cup in case of advancement to the group stage.
- AFC Cup
  - 2017: The league's second placers qualify directly for the group stage of the tournament, with third placers eligible to replace them whether they were unable to play in the competition; if the league's champions failed to advance to the group stage of AFC Champions League, they would still benefit from a free slot in the tournament.
  - 2018–2020: The winners of the Copa Paulino Alcantara qualify directly for the group stage of the tournament; if the league's champions failed to advance to the group stage of AFC Champions League, they would still benefit from a free slot in the tournament.
  - 2021–2023: The winners of the Copa Paulino Alcantara (or the league's second placers, only for the 2020 season) qualify directly for the group stage of the tournament.
- AFC Champions League Two
  - 2024–: The winners of the Copa Paulino Alcantara qualify for the AFC CL2 since the 2024–25 AFC Champions League Two qualifying play-offs, with the league winners being given direct qualification for the 2024–25 AFC Champions League Two group stage

=== Women's league ===
Level	League/Division
I	PFF Women's League; 6 clubs

Likewise, the premier women's football league in the country is the PFF Women's League, which was launched on November 5, 2016, by the Philippine Football Federation, to follow up with the PFF Women's Cup that was launched in 2014. The competition became the first to follow a league format following the folding of the Pinay Futbol League in 2013 and became the first women's domestic league in the country. The league sanctioned by PFF as an amateur league as part of FIFA's Women's Development Project for the Philippines.

== National teams ==
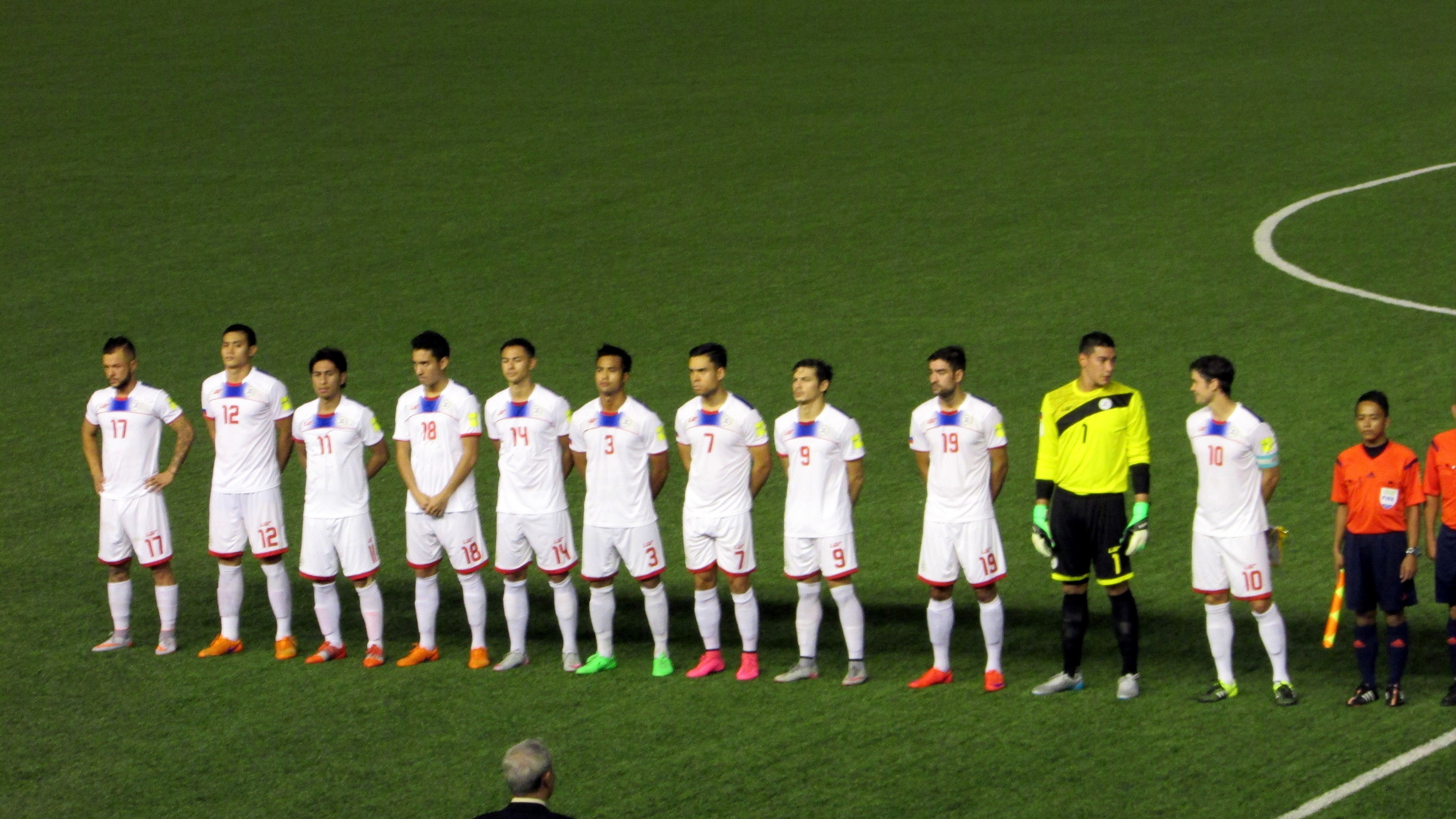
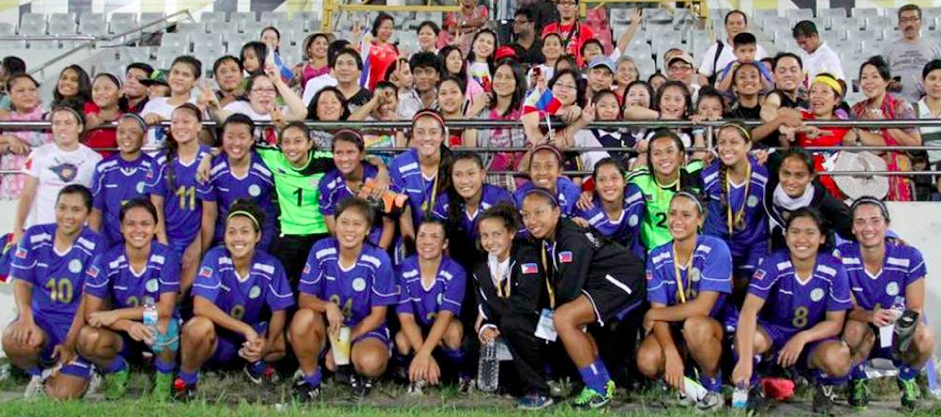
Players from the men's (left) and women's (right) national football teams.

=== Men's teams ===
The Philippine national men's football team represents the Philippines in men's international football. The national team is referred to as the "Azkals" ― a word that is similar to Filipino term Askal meaning street dog. In addition, there are other youth national teams that represent the country in other competitions such as the Philippines national under-23 football team, also known as the Philippine Olympic team, the Philippines national under-19 football team, and the Philippines national under-17 football team. The Philippines national futsal team represents men's international futsal, and the Philippines national beach soccer team in men's international beach soccer.

=== Women's teams ===
The women's team, also known as the "Filipinas (formerly Malditas)", represents the country in women's international football. The Filipinas captured a third-place (bronze) finish in the 1985 Southeast Asian Games and have competed in the AFC Women's Asian Cup. The women's team have also qualified for the FIFA Women's World Cup (first in 2023), while the men's and the youth teams have yet to qualify for their equivalent world cup tournaments. Philippines women's national futsal team represents the country in women's futsal.

== Stadiums ==
The Rizal Memorial Stadium in Manila is the national stadium of the Philippines, as well as the home venue of the national team. It has served as the main stadium of the 1954 Asian Games and a former venue for the United Football League. Established in 1934, the stadium has a capacity of 12,873. Another stadium, Panaad Stadium in Bacolod, is an alternative home stadium for the Philippines with 20,000 seats.

The Emperador Stadium in Taguig, the main stadium of the UFL, has an all-weather football pitch made of artificial turf, developed by real estate developer Megaworld Corporation and constructed by All Asia Structures, Inc. The University of Makati Stadium, another former UFL venue, is the first football stadium built by a local university, and has a capacity of 4,000. Iloilo Sports Complex is the host of home matches from Iloilo F.A. It hosted an international competition in the group stages of the 2013 AFC President's Cup.

In 2014, the Philippine Sports Stadium was opened in Bulacan, which is also the largest stadium in term of capacity in the Philippines.

Image	Stadium	Capacity	Location		Home Team
Image	Stadium	Capacity	City	Island Group	Home Team
	Philippine Sports Stadium	25,000	Ciudad de Victoria	Luzon	
	Governor Mariano Perdices Memorial Coliseum	25,000	Dumaguete	Visayas	
	New Clark City Athletics Stadium	20,000	New Clark City	Luzon	2019 Southeast Asian Games; United City
	Pelaéz Sports Complex	20,000	Cagayan de Oro	Mindanao	

== Attendances ==
The average attendance per top-flight football league season and the club with the highest average attendance:

Season	League average	Best club	Best club average
2022–23	161	Kaya	231

Source: League page on Wikipedia

== See also ==
- Sports in the Philippines
- List of football stadiums in the Philippines
- Women's football in the Philippines
