= Davao del Norte F.A. =

Davao del Norte Football Association
- Type: Football association
- Region served: Davao del Norte
- President: Renato Cosmod
- Parent organization: Philippine Football Federation

The Davao del Norte Football Association is a provincial football association under the Philippine Football Federation (PFF) which serves the Davao del Norte area. As of 2015, it is led by president Renato Cosmod who is also simultaneously serving as Vice President of the PFF. The Davao del Norte F.A. sends a team to represent the region in the yearly PFF National Men's Club Championship.
