= Zamboanga F.A. =

Zamboanga Football Association
- Type: Football association
- Headquarters: Zamboanga City
- President: Carlo M. Rodriguez
- Parent organization: Philippine Football Federation

The Zamboanga Football Association is a Filipino football association based in Zamboanga City. It works under the Philippine Football Federation as provincial football association for the Zamboanga province. The Zamboanga FA sends a team to represent the region in the yearly PFF National Men's Club Championship.

== Men's Club Championship teams ==
List of teams sent by the F.A. to the Club Championships.

- 2010-2011 - Alia FC, did not make it out of the cluster stage.
- 2012-2013 - Alberei FC
- 2013-2014 - Alia FC, made it to the national stage but then finished bottom of the table.
- 2014-2015 - Zamboanga Hermosa FC, made it to the intermediate Group Stage.
