= M. Lhuillier Jewelers F.C. =

Football club

M. Lhuillier Jewelers
- Full name: M. Lhuillier Jewelers Football Club
- Founded: 1987
- Dissolved: Yes (unknown date)
- Chair: Michel Lhuillier (1988)
- Head coach: Graeme Mackinnon (1988)
Home colours

M. Lhuillier Jewelers Football Club was a football club based in Cebu City. The team was known for winning the 1988 PFF National Championship. The Jewelers were the first and only Cebu-based team to win a national football championship.

== History ==
The M. Lhuillier Jewelers was formed in 1987 after Cebuano businessman Michel Lhuillier gathered a group of local-based players reinforced by Australian Graeme Mackinnon, Dipolog-resident Albert Regencia, and Jordanian Mike Ahmad. Locals were given academic scholarships by the club's team sponsor.

=== 1988 PFF National Championship ===
The Jewelers participated at the 1988 PFF National Championship then known as the Andres Soriano Memorial Cup as the youngest team in the tournament with an average player age of 22 with most players still in college. Rene Maambong and Edwin Arganza were the youngest at age 17 and playing head coach Graeme Mackinnon was the oldest then at 42 years old. The club played against five other teams.

The team was guided by Australian playing coach, Graeme Mackinnon. The Jewelers played four games in the elimination round and managed to place among the top two teams to advance to the finals. The tournament was only contested by five teams due to a typhoon.

The team had a scoreless draw with Dumaguete in their first match then won over Negros Occidental-Bacolod 1–0 in their second game courtesy of Mario Ceniza's lone goal. The team also won over Philippine Navy with the same scoreline where Randy Estremos scored a goal for the Jewelers and goalkeeper Gemini Sitoy saved a penalty. The team scored a much-needed draw with Iloilo, 0–0 to face against Victorias Milling Company of Bacolod, Negros Occidental in the finals.

The finals against Victorias Milling which was held on November 11, 1988, at the Santa Barbara pitch in Iloilo ended in a penalty shoot out after a nil-nil draw to determine the champions of the tournament. There was a lack of lighting and the shootout was delayed due to the crowd entering the field. After the police restored order to the Jewelers won the penalty shootout.

Jeweler goalkeeper, Gemini Sitoy was awarded Most Valuable Player of the tournament who ended as the only goalkeeper in the tournament that did not conceded a single goal in the tournament.

The 1988 squad later was inducted into the Cebu Sports Hall of Fame as a Special Honoree.

=== Post 1988 ===
The Jewelers again reached the finals of the National Championship at least two times. They lost to Dumaguete F.C. in the 1990 edition and to the Philippine Navy in 1991. The scoreline of the latter final was 0–1.

== Honors ==
- Philippines National Championship
  - Winners: 1988
  - Runners-up: 1990, 1991
