= Chieffy Caligdong =

Filipino footballer & coach (born 1982)

Emelio Caligdong
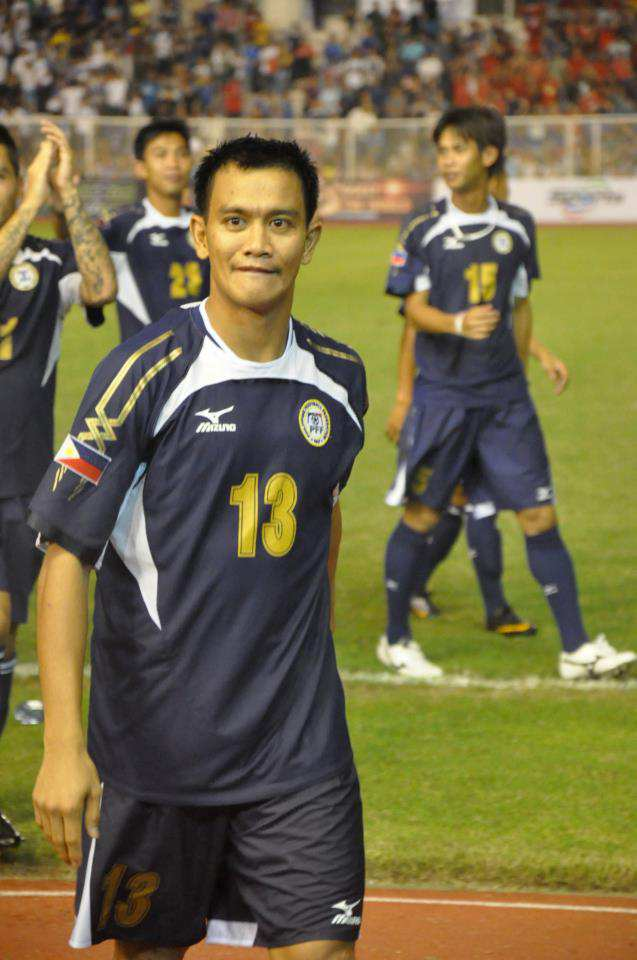

Personal information
- Full name: Emelio Asada Caligdong
- Date of birth: September 28, 1982 (age 44)
- Place of birth: Pototan, Philippines
- Height: 1.65 m (5 ft 5 in)
- Position: Left winger

Team information
- Current team: North Mississauga SC U-13 (assistant coach)

Senior career*
Years	Team	Apps	(Gls)
2002–2004	Union Manila		
2004–2012	Philippine Air Force		
2013–2014	Green Archers United	31+	(17)

International career
2005	Philippines U-23	6	(8)
2004–2013	Philippines	71	(16)

Managerial career
- 2014–2018: Green Archers United U-13 (coach)
- 2015: Philippines U-16 (assistant coach)
- 2016: Philippines U-14
- 2018: Perpetual Altas
Medal record
Men's football
Representing Philippines
AFC Challenge Cup
Bronze medal – third place	2012 Nepal
- * Club domestic league appearances and goals

Emelio "Chieffy" Asada Caligdong (born September 28, 1982) is a Filipino football head coach and former player. He is currently the head coach of the Ontario Development League Boys under-15 team, and also an assistant coach for North Mississauga SC's under-13 team.

Caligdong played as a left winger for the Philippines national team, of which he is a former captain. At the club level, he played for Philippine Air Force and Green Archers United of the United Football League. At that time, he was also an enlisted member of the Philippine Air Force.

After retiring, he coached Green Archers United, the Philippines' youth teams, and the Perpetual Altas.

== Early life ==
Emelio Asada Caligdong was born on 28 September 1982 in Pototan, Iloilo. He first played football when he was five years old and was encouraged to play by his brother Roberto, a member of the University of Santo Tomas football team and the national team. Caligdong was more known by his nickname "Chieffy" due to his grandfather being the police chief of his hometown of Barotac Nuevo. As early as his elementary school years, he represented Western Visayas in the Palarong Pambansa.

== Club career ==
Caligdong is a long time player of Philippine Air Force F.C. and was an enlisted member of the air force. He played for the club in the United Football League until 2012. He moved to another UFL club, Green Archers United, in January 2013.

Caligdong had a chance to play for another club when in January 2015, Cebu-based UC-ERCO Bro Nationals attempted to acquire service of several UFL players including himself through a loan for their stint at the 2014–15 PFF National Men's Club Championship finals. However, the UFL blocked the loan move and insisted that players from the UFL could not play for other clubs, even in competitions hosted by the Philippine Football Federation. The UFL also insisted that if Caligdong and other loaned players by ERCO suited for the club they could not return to their mother club. This was after other UFL teams complained about the loaning of players from Green Archers United.

== International career ==
Caligdong made his debut in the 2004 Tiger Cup , playing all four matches and scoring three goals. Two of those goals came in the 89th and 92nd minute in the 2–1 win over Timor-Leste, making it the first ever victory of the Philippines in the ASEAN Football Championship.

He has also played for the Philippines U-23 at the 2005 Southeast Asian Games and in the pre-SEA Games tournament where he scored against Myanmar and Timor-Leste.

In the first match of the Philippines of the qualifying playoff round of the 2012 AFC Challenge Cup qualification against Mongolia, Caligdong scored a goal in the 43rd minute.

On September 30, 2011, Caligdong scored two goals in a draw against Hong Kong and two more goals on October 4 against Macau in the 2011 Long Teng Cup. Caligdong, who shrugged off injuries to score both goals against Macau, emerged the top scorer for the tournament, earning the Golden Boot trophy.

On September 29, 2012, Caligdong scored a goal in the 34th minute in the last match of the 2012 Philippine Peace Cup versus Chinese Taipei, which ended in a 3–1 score line. The Philippines got the championship title with a 3 win, no draw and no loss record.

On November 27, 2012, Caligdong came in as a substitute in the 2nd half and scored an important goal for the Philippines in a 1–0 victory against Vietnam in the 2012 AFF Suzuki Cup. The Philippines eventually finished second in the group stage and qualified for the semi-finals with a 2 win, 1 loss record.

In November 2014, Caligdong announced his retirement from international football, citing issues on maintaining fitness and plans to focus more on his club.

=== International goals ===
Scores and results list the Philippines' goal tally first.

#	Date	Venue	Opponent	Score	Result	Competition
2004
1.	14 December	Bukit Jalil National Stadium, Kuala Lumpur	Timor-Leste	1–1	2–1	2004 Tiger Cup
2.	14 December	Bukit Jalil National Stadium, Kuala Lumpur	Timor-Leste	2–1	2–1	2004 Tiger Cup
3.	16 December	KLFA Stadium, Kuala Lumpur	Thailand	1–0	1–3	2004 Tiger Cup
2006
4.	14 November	Panaad Stadium, Bacolod	Timor-Leste	7–0	7–0	2007 AFF Championship qualifier
5.	20 November	Panaad Stadium, Bacolod	Brunei	3–0	4–1	2007 AFF Championship qualifier
2008
6.	13 May	Iloilo Sports Complex, Iloilo City	Brunei	1–0	1–0	2008 AFC Challenge Cup qualifier
2010
7.	12 October	Kaohsiung National Stadium, Kaohsiung	Macau	1–0	5–0	2010 Long Teng Cup
2011
8.	9 February	Panaad Stadium, Bacolod	Mongolia	1–0	2–0	2012 AFC Challenge Cup qualifier
9.	3 July	Rizal Memorial Stadium, Manila	Sri Lanka	1–0	4–0	2014 FIFA World Cup qualifier
10.	30 September	Kaohsiung National Stadium, Kaohsiung	Hong Kong	2–2	3–3	2011 Long Teng Cup
11.	30 September	Kaohsiung National Stadium, Kaohsiung	Hong Kong	3–2	3–3	2011 Long Teng Cup
12.	4 October	Kaohsiung National Stadium, Kaohsiung	Macau	1–0	2–0	2011 Long Teng Cup
13.	4 October	Kaohsiung National Stadium, Kaohsiung	Macau	2–0	2–0	2011 Long Teng Cup
2012
14.	7 September	Jurong West Stadium, Jurong West	Singapore	1–0	2–0	Friendly
15.	29 September	Rizal Memorial Stadium, Manila	Chinese Taipei	2–0	3–1	2012 Philippine Peace Cup
16.	27 November	Rajamangala Stadium, Bangkok	Vietnam	1–0	1–0	2012 AFF Suzuki Cup

== Coaching career ==
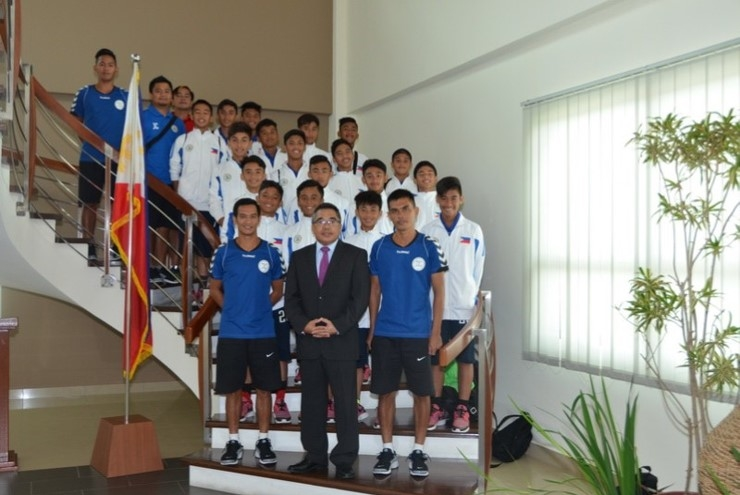
Caligdong (in blue; front left) with the Philippine U14 team

Caligdong obtained a "C" Coaching License sometime in 2014 and coached the Green Archers United youth team. He also aspired to become an assistant coach for the national football teams.

By March 2016, Caligdong became the head coach of the national under-14 team and a playing assistant coach for Green Archers United senior team. In May 2018, Caligdong became the head coach of the University of Perpetual Help football team, which plays in the National Collegiate Athletic Association (NCAA) of the Philippines succeeding Aaron Nebreja. Sometime in 2018, Caligdong and his family emigrated to Canada.

Caligdong acquired an AFC B license, UEFA B license, and a Canada B license by June 2020. By that time, Caligdong was already coaching local teams in Ontario, Canada: as head coach of the Ontario Development League Boys Under-15 team and as an assistant coach of North Mississauga SC's Under-13 team.

== Personal life ==
Emelio Caligdong is married to Renrose with whom he has three children. His family had been planning on emigrating to Texas as early as 2008 but such plans has been delayed due to Caligdong's football career. In 2018, they moved to Ontario, Canada instead of pursuing earlier plans to move to the United States. Caligdong's wife also has two sisters residing in Canada.

== Honours ==
=== Club ===
Philippine Air Force

- UFL Division 1: 2010, 2011
- UFL Cup: 2009, 2011
- UFL Cup: 2009, 2011

=== National team ===
- Long Teng Cup: Third 2010
- Long Teng Cup: Runners-up 2011
- AFC Challenge Cup: Third 2012
- Philippine Peace Cup: 2012, 2013

=== Individual ===
- Long Teng Cup Golden Boot: 1

2011

- PFF National Men's Club Championship Golden Boot: 1

2013

- Philippine Sportswriters Association Mr. Football Title: 1

2011

- The Outstanding Young Men (TOYM) Award for Sports: 1

2012

- ASEAN All-Stars: 2014
