= Ateneo F.C. =

Ateneo
- Full name: Ateneo Football Club
- Founded: 2004
- Ground: Ateneo de Manila University Field
- League: Filipino Premier League
- 2008: FPL, 5th
Home colors	Away colors

The Ateneo Football Club was an association football club based in Quezon City in the Philippines. It was associated with the Ateneo de Manila University and the Ateneo Football Center.

The club was founded on March 1, 2004.
