= Arirang F.C. =

Arirang
- Full name: Arirang Football Club
- Founded: 2004
- Ground: Panaad Stadium
- Head coach: Kim Chul-So (2008)
- League: Filipino Premier League
- 2008: FPL, 6th

Arirang Football Club was an association football club based in the Philippines. Coached by Kim Chul-So and made out of entirely of Korean expatriates, they played in the Filipino Premier League, which is now defunct. The club played at Panaad Stadium.
