= Joshua Beloya =

American-Filipino association footballer

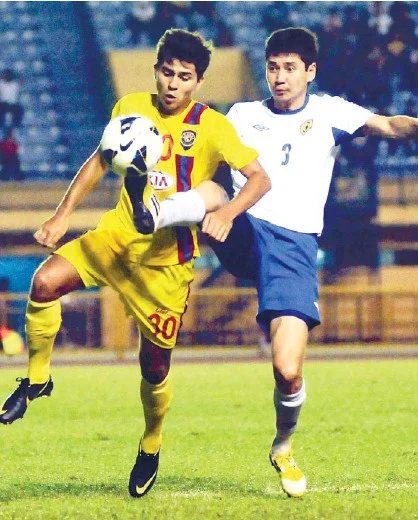
- Beloya with Global

Personal information
- Full name: Joshua Beloya McNally
- Date of birth: February 20, 1995 (age 31)
- Place of birth: Bacolod, Philippines
- Height: 5 ft 10 in (1.78 m)
- Position: Striker

Youth career
- FC Zürich

Senior career*
Years	Team	Apps	(Gls)
2011	Ceres	46	(25)
2012	Kaya	12	(6)
2012–2013	Ceres	23	(16)
2013	Global	5	(2)
2014–2015	Ceres	24	(11)
2015–2016	Kaya	10	(5)
2016	Stallion Laguna	14	(8)
2018	Global	4	(2)

International career^{‡}
2012	Philippines U-21	8	(5)
2011	Philippines U-23	4	(3)
- * Club domestic league appearances and goals as of May 2, 2013 ‡ National team caps and goals as of November 15, 2012

Joshua Beloya McNally (born February 20, 1995) commonly known as Joshua Beloya, is an American-Filipino football player.

== Club career ==
Beloya played for the youth team of FC Zürich in his early days. When he relocated to Bacolod, he joined Ceres FC and became part of the Bacolod selection which became the champions of the 2011 PFF National Men's U-23 Championship. He was then named the tournament's best striker after scoring 15 goals.

In early January 2012, he signed up for Kaya in the United Football League. He made his debut in the 1–0 win against Philippine Air Force in the opening match.

On April 1, 2013, it was announced that Global F.C. signed Beloya in an effort to beef up its lineup for the Asian Football Confederation President's Cup in May, 2013. He made his Global debut on April 2, 2013, in the 1–1 draw against the Loyola Meralco Sparks F.C. coming in as a substitute in the 85th minute for Ange Guisso.

== International career ==
Beloya came to the attention of the Philippines national football team assistant coach in May 2011 when he scored 12 goals in five matches for his club Ceres FC. By September 2011, he joined the national team training pool and was named in the provisional Philippines under-23 squad for the 2011 Southeast Asian Games. During the tournament, he was noted as the player who scored the two late goals in the team's only winning match against Laos which ended 3–2. Beloya is also a member of the Philippine Dolphins, the Philippines national beach soccer team.

== Personal life ==
Beloya was born in Olongapo to an American father and a Filipina mother. His father, Joe Lawrence McNally, was an American serviceman who died while Joshua was in his early childhood. His mother then remarried a Swiss citizen and moved to Switzerland, where he grew up until he and his mother relocated to Bacolod, the mother's hometown, in his mid-teens.

== Honors ==
Ceres

- PFF National Men's Club Championship: 2012–13, 2013–14
