= Ameztoy =

Filipino association football player

Personal information
- Full name: Gregorio Ameztoy Querejeta
- Date of birth: 15 May 1916
- Place of birth: La Carlota, Philippines
- Date of death: 24 October 1972 (aged 56)
- Place of death: Spain
- Position: Midfielder

Senior career*
Years	Team	Apps	(Gls)
1933–1943	Zaragoza	89	(13)
1943–1946	Atlético Madrid	33	(3)
1947–1948	Gimnàstic de Tarragona	3	(0)
- * Club domestic league appearances and goals

Gregorio Ameztoy Querejeta (15 May 1916 - 24 October 1972) was a Filipino professional footballer who played as a midfielder for Gimnàstic de Tarragona in Spain.

== Early life ==
Ameztoy was born in 1916 in La Carlota, Philippines, to Basque Spanish parents from Zestoa, Spain.

Ameztoy attended the Colegio Nuestra Señora del Buen Consejo en Lecároz.

== Career ==
Ameztoy debuted for Spanish side Zaragoza at the age of seventeen. He became the first Filipino footballer to play in the Spanish La Liga. Altogether, he made over 90 appearances in the Spanish La Liga.

== Style of play ==
Ameztoy mainly operated as a midfielder and was known for his in-game intelligence, ability to use his right foot, and technical ability.

== Personal life ==
Ameztoy had two sisters and two brothers.
