= Pelaéz Sports Complex =

Sports complex in Cagayan de Oro, Philippines

- Don Dulvy Pelaéz Stadium aerial view
- Interactive map of Pelaéz Sports Complex
- Full name: Don Gregorio Pelaéz Sports Complex
- Former names: Don Mariano Marcos Sports Complex
- Location: Don A. Velez St. Cagayan de Oro, Philippines
- Coordinates: 8.2853°N 124.3848°E
- Capacity: 20,000
- Surface: grass

Construction
- Opened: August 5, 1970; 56 years ago

Don Gregorio Pelaéz Sports Complex is a group of sports facilities in Cagayan de Oro.

== History ==
The Pelaéz Sports Complex was opened on August 5, 1970. It served as the venue of the first Palarong Pambansa in Mindanao and outside Metro Manila in 1965.

== Facilities ==
It has a seating capacity of 20,000.

== Sports Event ==
- 1975, 1977, 1978, 1988 Palarong Pambansa
- 2002 Mindanao Friendship games
- Milo Little Olympics - Mindanao (Since 1997)
- 2008 Philippine Olympic Festival & National Championships
- 2010 National Milo Little Olympics
- 2011 PFF–Smart Club Championships (elimination round)
- 2014 Mindanao Unity Games (INC)

== See also ==
- Cagayan de Oro
