= Manila Sporting Club =

All Manila
- Full name: Manila Sporting Club
- Founded: early 1900s
Home colours	Away colours

Manila Sporting Club, also known as All Manila, was a Filipino football club based in Manila, Philippines. Founded in the earliest years of the 1900s, it was one of the first clubs to be established in the country and alongside Manila Jockey Club (1900s), Sandow Athletic Club (1906), Bohemian Sporting Club (1910), Manila Nomads Sports Club (1914) and Aurora Athletic Club (1910s) was one of the pioneers of football in the Philippines. When football in the Philippines started rise in popularity, more and more clubs emerged and a National Football Championship, the very first one, was organized in 1911. All Manila was the winner of that year and became the first ever Filipino club football champions.

== Honors ==
- Philippines National Championship
  - Winners: 1911
