= Federated F.A. of Masbate =

Federated Football Association of Masbate
- Formation: 1991
- Type: Football association
- Region served: Masbate
- President: Diobe B. Arellano
- Parent organization: Philippine Football Federation

The Federated Football Association of Masbate is a Filipino football association based in Masbate. It works under the Philippine Football Federation as provincial football association for the region.
