= Zamboanga del Sur – Pagadian F.A. =

Zamboanga del Sur – Pagadian Football Association
- Formation: 1999
- Type: Football association
- Headquarters: Zamboanga City
- Location: Pagadian
- Region served: Zamboanga del Sur
- Secretary General: Diole Dinglasa
- President: Bayani Jose Abad
- Parent organization: Philippine Football Federation

The Zamboanga del Sur - Pagadian Football Association is a Philippine provincial football association based in Pagadian in Zamboanga del Sur. Founded in 1999 it works under the Philippine Football Federation as a provincial football association for the Zamboanga del Sur province area. As of 2015 it is under the leadership of President Bayani Jose Abad and Secretary General Diole Dinglasa.
