= Filipino Premier League =

- Founded: 2008
- Folded: 2008
- Country: Philippines
- Confederation: AFC
- Divisions: 1
- Number of clubs: 8
- Level on pyramid: 1
- Last champions: Philippine Army (2008)
- Most championships: Philippine Army

The Filipino Premier League was the top-level football league of the Philippines, operating under the country's football governing body, the Philippine Football Federation. The league was announced on August 2, 2008, and started on September 21, 2008. It was replaced by the United Football League in 2009.

The league was not fully professional.

The only 2008–2009 season was supposed to have three regional tournaments, one each in Luzon, Visayas, and Mindanao which was supposed to be followed by the Filipino Premier League National Championships to be held in late 2009. The Visayas and Mindanao regional tournaments supposed to be held in the first half of 2009 did not pushed through, as well as the subsequent national championship.

== 2008 Filipino Premier League ==
=== Clubs ===
Poster featuring the logos of the football clubs in the Philippines.

- Arirang
- Ateneo
- Diliman
- Giligan's
- Mendiola United
- Pasagrad
- Philippine Army
- Union

=== Group stage ===
The season began on September 21, 2008, and ended on December 14, 2008.

Team	Pld	W	D	L	GF	GA	GD	Pts
Giligan's	6	4	2	0	19	10	+9	14
Philippine Army	6	4	2	0	14	6	+8	14
Mendiola United	5	3	1	1	29	7	+22	10
Pasargad	6	3	0	3	13	9	+4	9
Ateneo	7	3	0	4	12	16	−4	9
Arirang	5	2	0	3	10	21	−11	6
Diliman	6	1	0	5	4	19	−15	3
Union	5	0	1	4	5	18	−13	1

=== Final round ===
==== Semifinals ====
December 6, 2008

Philippine Army	3–1 (a.e.t.)	Pasargad
Gener 52'; Bretana 114'; Margarse 118'	Report	Leyble 49'

December 6, 2008

Mendiola United	1–2 (a.e.t.)	Giligan's
Orcullo 14'	Report	Palmes 57'; Tonog 69'

==== Third place ====
December 14, 2008

Mendiola United	0–2	Pasargad
	Report

==== Final ====
December 14, 2008

Philippine Army	2–0	Giligan's
Becite 30'; Romano 76'	Report
