= Giligan's F.C. =

Giligan's
- Full name: Giligan's Football Club
- Owner: Filberto Alquiros
- League: Filipino Premier League
- 2008: 2nd

The Giligan's Football Club was an association football club based in the Philippines.

== Honors ==
- Filipino Premier League

- Runners-up (1): 2008

== See also ==
- Giligan's Sisig Kings (PSL volleyball team)
