= Iloilo F.A. =

Iloilo Football Association
- Abbreviation: IFA
- Type: Football association
- Headquarters: Iloilo City
- Region served: Iloilo
- President: Roceller Sumbillo
- Parent organization: Philippine Football Federation

The Iloilo Football Association is a Filipino football association based in Iloilo City. It works under the Philippine Football Federation as provincial football association for the Iloilo province area. The Iloilo FA sends a team to represent the region in the yearly PFF National Men's Club Championship. Most of competitions formed by the association are played Iloilo Sports Complex, which has a capacity of about 10,000.

Most successful teams and players come from Barotac Nuevo, 27 km north of the city. The town counts Chieffy Caligdong as one of its product. Sta. Barbara and La Paz likewise have developed skilled players who have played at the national level.

Stallion FC, a club that plays in the United Football League is affiliated with the IFA.

Philippine Air Force FC, an association football club that plays in the UFL has players coming from Iloilo and play for the IFA when called up.

Iloilo hosted the PFF Smart Club Championship-Group B on August 9–13 of 2011 which was facilitated by IFA wherein the games were played at the Barotac Nuevo Football Field and Central Philippine University.

Mariano Araneta Jr, the current Philippine Football Federation is the former president of IFA.
