= Quezon – Batangas R.F.A. =

Quezon - Batangas Regional Football Association
- Formation: 1999
- Type: Football association
- Region served: Quezon and Batangas
- Secretary General: Ma. Lalaine A. Sarmiento
- President: Mario F. Nañola
- Parent organization: Philippine Football Federation

The Quezon - Batangas Football Association is a Filipino football association based in Lucban in Quezon province. It works under the Philippine Football Federation as a provincial football association for Quezon and Batangas province.
