= Central Visayas F.A. =

Central Visayas Football Association
- Formation: December 18, 1961 (as Cebu FA); 2016 (as Central Visayas FA)
- Founder: Rosendo Hernaez
- Type: Football association
- Headquarters: Cebu City
- Region served: Bohol and Cebu
- President: Rodney Orale
- Parent organization: Philippine Football Federation

The Central Visayas Football Association is a Filipino football association. It works under the Philippine Football Federation as a regional football association for the provinces of Bohol and Cebu. It was formed in 2016 when Cebu FA absorbed Bohol FA to form the regional football association.

== History ==
=== As Cebu Football Association ===
Logo as the Cebu Football Association.

Not after the 1940s, football was introduced in Cebu by foreigners who were mostly clergy, expatriates, and officers and crewmembers from visiting ships. No major league was organized but competitions during weekends or as part of school celebrations were organized. Matches were also organized when foreign ships dock, where the visiting team often composes of officers and crewmembers of the ship.

Before the formation of the Cebu Football Association, former congressman and businessman William Chiongbian was instrumental to the development of football in Cebu. Chongbian, who played football during college formed the William Lines Football Team. The football team initially played matches within Cebu against local collegiate teams, seminarians, and visiting teams and later played outside Cebu such as in Dumaguete, Bacolod and Iloilo which are considered as football strongholds in the country. Chongbian also encouraged the formation of other football teams such as the Casino Español, Hap Hing Hardware and United Hardware.

The William Lines team eventually went to Manila to take part in competitions in the capital. However, due to issues in his shipping business forces Chongbian to disband the team.

Rosendo Hernaez, a football player and engineer organized the Cebu Football Association on December 18, 1961. Hernaez was elected as the association's first president. The composition of the first Board of Directors were Gregorio Sodusta, Vice-president, Valentino Darunday, SVD, Treasurer, and Joaquin M. de Ubago SR, Secretary.

=== Establishment of the Central Visayas RFA ===
In January 2016, it was reported that the Cebu FA will be dissolved in line with the new regulations on football associations by the Philippine Football Federation and is to be absorbed into a regional football association. By mid-2016, Cebu FA was renamed as the Central Visayas Regional Football Association and absorbed PFF probationary member Bohol F.A. Despite the regional association's name, Siquijor which is part of the Central Visayas administrative region is outside the organization's scope and formed a separate regional association with Negros Oriental.

== Partnerships ==
The CVFA is partnered with the Aboitiz Group of Companies and helps the company organize the Aboitiz Cup. The federation is also partnered with the Cebu Schools Athletic Foundation Inc. (CESAFI) collegiate league.

== See also ==
- List of football clubs in the Philippines
