= Philippine Navy F.C. =

Philippine Navy
- Badge as of 2012 when the club was in the UFL
- Full name: Fleet–Marine Team Navy Football Club
- League: UFL Division 2
- 2014: UFL, 10th

Philippine Navy Football Club was a football club based in the Philippines under the administration of the Philippine Navy.

== History ==
Navy FC was champion of the Manila Football League in 1966, the de facto top flight football league in the country from 1930 to 1967.

In the 1991 championship, the Navymen was under coach Felix Servita Sr. who was also the coach of the San Beda Football Team that captured the NCAA crown in the same year.

The club reached the quarter-finals of the 2010 UFL Cup where it was defeated by eventual Cup runner-up Philippine Air Force F.C. The club participated in Weekend Football League Elite 2018 and a regular participant in the annual AFP-PNP-PCG Olympics. The Philippine Navy FC were crowned PFF National Football Champions in 1981–82, 1991, 1999 as NCR-B (Navy & Air Force selection) and 2005 (competed as National Capital Region).

The Navy football team during three decades (the 1980s, 1990s, 2000s and the early 2010s) won most of the major football tournaments in the country. During the absence of a professional football league, the armed forces teams were a platform for many talented local footballers to extend their careers, as they were feeders for the national team.

The Navy team official colors were blue and white.

== Honors ==
- Philippines National Championship
  - Winners (4): 1981–82, 1991, 1999^, 2005#
- Manila Football League
  - Winners (1): 1966

^ Competed as NCR-B (Navy and Air Force combination)
# Competed as NCR
