= Negros Occidental F.A. =

Negros Occidental Regional Football Association
- Abbreviation: NORFA
- Type: Football association
- Region served: Negros Occidental
- Secretary General: Augustine Rey Rivas
- President: Jose Miguel Volmayor
- Parent organization: Philippine Football Federation

The Negros Occidental Regional Football Association is a Filipino football association based in Bacolod. It works under the Philippine Football Federation as provincial football association for the Negros Occidental.

== Structure ==
=== Affiliated clubs ===
- Bago City FC
- Cadiz City FC
- Ceres FC
- Dancalan FC
- Don Bosco FC
- Escalante FC
- Himamaylan City FC
- Kabankalan FC
- La Carlota FC
- Ma-ao FC
- Minuluan FC
- Pontevedra FC
- Sagay City FC
- San Carlos FC
- Victorias City FC

=== Officials ===
Position	Name
President	Jose Miguel Valmayor
Vice president	Rene Dofitas
General secretary	Augustine Rey Rivas
Board of directors	Junie Lizares (Minuluan FC)
Board of directors	Raymando Baldava (Don Bosco FC)
Board of directors	Mariano Antonio Cui III (San Carlos FC)
Board of directors	Jose Ma. Sanson (Bago City FC)
Board of directors	Augustine Rey Rivas (Kabankalan FC)
Board of directors	Gerald Pornan (Ma-ao FC)
Honorary board member	Carlos “Charlie” Cojuangco

== Competitions ==
- NOFA 12 and under Invitational Cup
- Dynamic Football League
- NORFA Champions League
