= PFF National Men's Club Championship =

Defunct football competition in the Philippines

- Organising body: Philippine Football Federation
- Founded: 2011
- Folded: 2015
- Country: Philippines
- Confederation: AFC (Asia)
- Number of clubs: 8 (last edition)
- International cup(s): AFC President's Cup (2014); AFC Cup (2015 - 2016)
- Last champions: Loyola
- Most championships: Ceres (2)

The Philippine Football Federation National Men's Club Championship was an annual football competition organized by the Philippine Football Federation and contested by Filipino clubs. It lasted for four seasons from 2011 to 2014–15 and was replaced by the Copa Paulino Alcantara. It was sponsored by Smart Communications and therefore known as the PFF–Smart National Men's Club Championship.

== History ==
The Philippine Football Federation (PFF) had not been able to organize a national tournament since 2007, when they staged the PFF Centennial Men's Open Championship. However, the semi-final finish of the Philippine national team in the 2010 AFF Championship increased the sport's popularity in the country. In January 2011, Smart Communications approached the PFF with an offer to finance a new domestic football competition. The proposed partnership was set to last 10 years, with Smart releasing ₱80 million in funds with the aim of providing more playing opportunities for skilled football players, and the eventual creation of a national league.

Newly installed Philippine Football Federation president Mariano V. Araneta subsequently approved the proposal. In March 2011, the new tournament commenced under the name PFF–Smart Men's Club Championship.

== Seasons ==
- 2011
- 2012–13
- 2013–14
- 2014–15

== Cup winners and runners-up ==
=== List of finals ===
Key
†	Match was won during extra time
*	Match was won on a penalty shoot-out
&	Match was won on aggregate over two legs

List of PFF National Men's Club Championship finals
Season	Winners	Score	Runners-up	Venue
2011	Global	3–2^{&}^{[A]}	San Beda	Rizal Memorial Stadium, Manila
2012–13	Ceres	1–0	PSG	Rizal Memorial Stadium, Manila
2013–14	Ceres	3–1^{&}^{[B]}	Global	Panaad Stadium, Bacolod
2014–15	Loyola	2–0	Global	Rizal Memorial Stadium, Manila

=== Results by club ===
Performances in the PFF National Men's Club Championship by club
Club	Titles	Runners-up	Seasons won	Seasons runner-up
Ceres	2	0	2012–13, 2013–14	—
Global	1	2	2011	2013–14, 2014–15
Loyola	1	0	2014–15	—
PSG	0	1	—	2012–13
San Beda	0	1	—	2011

== Notes ==
A. Global won the first leg 3–0, and San Beda won the second meeting 2–0.

B. Ceres won the first leg 2–1 and the second leg 1–0.
