= National Capital Region F.A. =

National Capital Region Football Association
- Abbreviation: NCRFA
- Formation: 1982
- Type: Football association
- Region served: Metro Manila
- President: Mico Gutierrez
- Parent organization: Philippine Football Federation

The National Capital Region Football Association, also known as the NCR Football Association or NCRFA, is a Filipino football association based in Metro Manila. It works under the Philippine Football Federation as regional football association for Metro Manila.

The NCRFA was involved in the organization of the now-defunct United Football League.

The association has fielded a football team and have won national titles.
