= Davao-South R.F.A. =

Davao-South Regional Football Association (DRFA)
- Abbreviation: DRFA
- Type: Football association
- Headquarters: Tionko Football Grounds, Barangay 76-A, Quimpo Boulevard, Davao City
- Region served: Davao City, Davao del Sur and Davao Oriental
- Members: 24 Legitimate Clubs (2018)
- President: Mr. Ernesto Ortonio
- Parent organization: Philippine Football Federation
- Website: davaofa.com/
- Formerly called: Davao Football Association (DFA)

The Davao-South Regional Football Association or DRFA is a Filipino football association based in Davao City. It works under the Philippine Football Federation (PFF) as a football association for Davao City. This scope was expanded by a mandate by the Philippine Football Federation allowing the Association's jurisdiction over clubs in Davao del Sur, Davao Occidental and Davao Oriental.

== Member clubs ==
As of January 2015, there are 24 legitimate clubs registered with the Davao-South Regional FA, 23 of which are based in Davao City. The other club team that is registered with the Association outside of Davao is from Davao del Sur. All registered clubs under the Association are sanctioned by the Philippine Football Federation.

1. A.L. Navarro NHS FC

2. Black Knights FC

3. Bansalan FC

4. Crocs FC

5. D'Davao Survivors FC

6. Davao Hyenas FC

7. Davao Grassroots Champions League (DGCL) FC

8. DRFA Coaches Association

9. DRFA Referee's Association

10. First Companions FC

11. Green Strikers FC

12. Hexamindz FC

13. KTMSCES FC

14. Lady Knights FC

15. Oi Rogers FC

16. PCT-Medvil FC

17. PTA Boys FC

18. Rovers FC Davao

19. RMC FC

20. Sakya FC

21. SOS FC

22. Southshield FC

23. UM FC

24. UP Mindanao FC

- Registered and legitimate members as of December 2018

== Current Elected Officers 2024-2028 ==
- President : Mr. Ernesto Ortonio
- Vice President : Mr. Rex Rodriguez

Board of Trustees

- Mr. Alex Adolfo
- Prof. Ramon Beleno III
- Mr. Danny Boy Fernandez
- Mr. Carlos Labadora
- Ms. Joyce Rendon
- Ms. Rachelle Delos Reyes
- Mr. Murphy Jake Somosot
- Engr. Gerry Zanoria

== Former set of officers ==
Taken from the DRFA's website 15 April 2019

- Engr. Henry B. Sabate - President
- Engr. Gerry G. Zanoria - Vice President
- David Dwight B. Peñano - General Secretary
- Rachelle Delos Reyes - Female Representative

Board of Trustees

- Ramonito Carreon
- Joe Castillo
- Janice Celestial
- Danny Boy Fernandez
- Carlos Labadora
- Carlos Martin
- Erwin Protacio

== Competitions ==
The DRFA also runs several competitions:

- Allianz National Youth Futsal Invitational
- Araw ng Dabaw FootFest
- PIA CUP
