= 2014–15 Loyola Meralco Sparks F.C. season =

Loyola Meralco Sparks
2014–15 season
- Chairman: Manuel V. Pangilinan
- Head Coach: Simon McMenemy
- UFL Division 1: Third
- PFF Club Championship: Winners
- 2014 UFL FA Cup: Fourth
- 2014 UFL FA League Cup: Third
Home colours	Away colours	Third colours

The 2014–15 season is Loyola's 6th season in the Philippines premier league, the UFL Division 1.

== Squad ==
As of 6 February 2015

Note: Flags indicate national team as defined under FIFA eligibility rules; some limited exceptions apply. Players may hold more than one non-FIFA nationality.

No.	Pos.	Nation	Player
2	DF	ENG	Adam Mitter
3	MF	PHI	Matthew Hartmann
4	DF	PHI	Anton del Rosario
5	MF	PHI	Eddie Mallari
6	MF	PHI	Vito Tanton
7	MF	PHI	James Younghusband (captain)
8	MF	PHI	Simon Greatwich
9	FW	PHI	Freddy Gonzalez
10	FW	PHI	Phil Younghusband (vice-captain)
11	DF	PHI	Roxy Dorlas
12	FW	AUS	Tahj Minniecon
13	DF	PHI	Josh Grommen
16	MF	ENG	Max Wright

No.	Pos.	Nation	Player
17	MF	PHI	Charlie Beaton
18	MF	USA	Anthony Putrus-Schnell
20	FW	PHI	Graham Caygill
21	MF	PHI	Jorrel Aristorenas
23	FW	ENG	Jamal Fenelon
25	GK	PHI	Ricardo Padilla Jr
26	GK	PHI	Tomas Trigo
33	DF	ESP	Joaquín Cañas
47	MF	KOR	Lee Joo-young
55	DF	CMR	Yves Ashime

=== Overview ===
Competition	Started round	Current position / round	Final position / round	First match	Last match
PFF Club Championship	Group Stage	—	Winners	January 22, 2015	January 31, 2015
UFL Division 1	—	—	Third		
UFL FA Charity Cup	Semi-finals	—	Fourth	July 19, 2014	July 26, 2014
UFL FA League Cup	Group stage	—	Third	September 23, 2014	November 6, 2014
