= 2013–14 Loyola Meralco Sparks F.C. season =

Loyola Meralco Sparks
2013–14 season
- Chairman: Manuel V. Pangilinan
- Head Coach: Joseph Vicent Santos
Home colours	Away colours	Third colours

The 2013–14 season is Loyola's 5th season in the Philippines premier league, the UFL Division 1. They won the 2013 UFL Cup by defeating Pachanga Diliman, 3–2.

== Current squad ==
As of 18 January 2014

Note: Flags indicate national team as defined under FIFA eligibility rules; some limited exceptions apply. Players may hold more than one non-FIFA nationality.

No.	Pos.	Nation	Player
1	GK	(Philippines) PHI	Ref Cuaresma
2	DF	(Ghana) GHA	Samuel Bonney
3	MF	(Philippines) PHI	Matthew Hartmann
4	MF	(South Korea) KOR	Lee Won Hyung
5	DF	(Cameroon) CMR	Rodrigue Nembot
7	MF	(Philippines) PHI	James Younghusband (captain)
8	MF	(South Korea) KOR	Park Bo Bae
9	FW	(Philippines) PHI	Freddy Gonzalez
10	FW	(Philippines) PHI	Phil Younghusband
11	DF	(Philippines) PHI	Roxy Dorlas
12	MF	(Philippines) PHI	Jake Morallo
14	MF	(Philippines) PHI	Simon Greatwich
15	FW	(Philippines) PHI	Alexandro Elnar
16	FW	(Philippines) PHI	Armand del Rosario
22	GK	(Ghana) GHA	Baba Sampana

No.	Pos.	Nation	Player
23	MF	(Philippines) PHI	Robert Cañedo
27	DF	(Philippines) PHI	Peter Fadrigalan
33	DF	(Spain) ESP	Joaquín Cañas
35	FW	(Philippines) PHI	Chy Villasenor
37	MF	(Philippines) PHI	Paolo Bugas
38	MF	(Philippines) PHI	Arnel Amita
47	FW	(South Korea) KOR	Lee Joo-Young
55	DF	(Cameroon) CMR	Yves Ashime

== Competitions ==
=== Pre-season and Friendlies ===
September 7, 2013 Pre-season	Loyola	9 – 2	Philippine Army	Taguig
16:00 PST	Joo Young 3'; P. Younghusband 18', 26', 32' (pen.); M. J. Hartmann 32', 67'; J. Younghusband 35'; Morallo 57'; Gould 69'	Details; Report	Gener 42'; Becite 50'	Stadium: Emperador Stadium

September 11, 2013 Pre-season	Dolphins United	0 – 7	Loyola	Taguig
19:00 PST		Details	Gould 5'; P. Younghusband 50', 63', 85'; Joo-young 69', 83'; Bugas 87'	Stadium: Emperador Stadium

September 17, 2013 Pre-season	Loyola	2 – 0	Pachanga	Taguig
16:00 PST	J. Younghusband 84', 90+2' (pen.)	Details		Stadium: Emperador Stadium

September 23, 2013 Pre-season	Global	0 – 3 Awarded (Note: UFL Disciplinary Committee awarded Loyola a 3–0 win as a result of Global fielding the ineligible player Rufo Sánchez. The match originally ended 3–1 in favor to Global.)	Loyola	Taguig
20:00 PST		Details		Stadium: Emperador Stadium

September 27, 2013 Pre-season	Global	2 – 1	Loyola	Taguig
20:00 PST	D. De Jong 38'; Mbata 82'	Details	Ashime 20'	Stadium: Emperador Stadium

October 6, 2013 Pre-season	Loyola	2 – 0	Manila Nomads	Taguig
17:00 PST	P. Younghusband 15'; Bonney 21'	Details		Stadium: Emperador Stadium

October 10, 2013 Pre-season	Global	0 – 3 Awarded (Note: The UFL awarded Loyola a 3–0 win by default after Global failed to show up for the championship game Thursday night at the Emperador Stadium in McKinley Hill.)	Loyola	Taguig
18:00 PST				Stadium: Emperador Stadium

September 21, 2013 2013 Menpora Cup	Arema Indonesia	1 – 0	(Philippines) Loyola	Malang, East Java
18:30 WIB	Gonzáles 21'	Details; Report		Stadium: Kanjuruhan Stadium

September 23, 2013 2013 Menpora Cup	Persepam Madura United (Indonesia)	1 – 3	(Philippines) Loyola	Malang, East Java
15:30 WIB	Rumba 19'	Details; Report	Joo-young 18'; J. Younghusband 44'; Aryanto 55' (o.g.)	Stadium: Kanjuruhan Stadium

September 25, 2013 2013 Menpora Cup	Mitra Kukar (Indonesia)	5 – 1	(Philippines) Loyola	Malang, East Java
15:30 WIB	Frangipane 1', 28', 80'; Suyono 24'; Zamrun 52'	Details; Report	Joo-young 46'	Stadium: Kanjuruhan Stadium

=== UFL Cup ===
October 19, 2013 Group Stage	Loyola	16 – 0	Dolphins United	Taguig
18:00 PST	J. Younghusband 10', 29', 70'; Gould 35', 43', 47'; Bonney 41'; Cañedo 52'; Joo-young 45+1'; Morallo 56', 67', 73'; Elnar 74'; Dorlas 77'; Amita 80', 83'	Report		Stadium: Emperador Stadium

October 27, 2013 Group Stage	Loyola	9 – 0	Philippine Navy	Taguig
16:00 PST	Gould 23'; P. Younghusband 48', 49', 59', 67', 72', 76'; Cañedo 64'; Morallo 88'	Report		Stadium: Emperador Stadium

October 30, 2013 Group Stage	Blue Guards	0 – 33	Loyola	Taguig
19:00 PST		Report	Samuel Bonney 1'; P. Younghusband 2', 11', 19', 28', 62', 69', 80', 90'; M. J. Hartmann 8', 17', 18', 46', 55'; J. Younghusband 13', 22', 26', 56', 78'; Cañedo 15'; Joo-young 16', 33', 41'; Gould 48', 57', 66', 68', 79', 82', 87'; Morallo 54', 64'; S. Greatwich 85'	Stadium: Emperador Stadium

November 7, 2013 Group Stage	Green Archers United	0 – 3	Loyola	Taguig
21:00 PST		Report	M. J. Hartmann 50'; Gould 83'; Amita 89'	Stadium: Emperador Stadium

November 19, 2013 Round of 16	Cimarron	0 – 10	Loyola	Taguig
20:30 PST		Report	J. Younghusband 4', 77'; Gould 16', 40'; Joo-young 20'; P. Younghusband 23', 66', 92'; M. J. Hartmann 74' de Luis 10(o.g.)'	Stadium: Emperador Stadium

November 26, 2013 Quarter-finals	Global	0 – 2	Loyola	Taguig
20:30 PST		Report	P. Younghusband 58'; M. J. Hartmann 76'	Stadium: Emperador Stadium

December 3, 2013 Semi-finals	Green Archers United	0 – 2	Loyola	Taguig
17:15 PST		Report	P. Younghusband 14', 58'	Stadium: Emperador Stadium

December 5, 2013 Finals	Loyola	3 – 2	Pachanga Diliman	Taguig
20:30 PST	J. Younghusband 19'; Gould 45'; P. Younghusband 52'	Report	Zerrudo Jr. 16', 53'	Stadium: Emperador Stadium

=== Overview ===
Competition	Started round	Current position / round	Final position / round	First match	Last match
PFF Club Championship	Did not participate				
UFL Division 1	—	—			
UFL Cup	Group stage	—	Champions	October 19, 2013	December 5, 2013
