= 2015–16 Loyola Meralco Sparks F.C. season =

Loyola Meralco Sparks
2015–16 season
- Chairman: Manuel V. Pangilinan
- Head Coach: Simon McMenemy
Home colours	Away colours

The 2015–16 season is Loyola's 7th season in the Philippines premier league, the UFL Division 1.

== Current squad ==
As of 13 January 2016

Note: Flags indicate national team as defined under FIFA eligibility rules; some limited exceptions apply. Players may hold more than one non-FIFA nationality.

No.	Pos.	Nation	Player
2	DF	(England) ENG	Adam Mitter
4	DF	(Philippines) PHI	Anton del Rosario
5	DF	(Philippines) PHI	Eddie Mallari
6	MF	(Philippines) PHI	Jason de Jong
7	MF	(Philippines) PHI	James Younghusband (captain)
8	MF	(Philippines) PHI	Simon Greatwich
9	FW	(Philippines) PHI	Gerardo Valmayor III
10	FW	(Philippines) PHI	Phil Younghusband (vice-captain)
11	MF	(Philippines) PHI	Jorrel Aristorenas
12	MF	(Australia) AUS	Tahj Minniecon
14	MF	(Japan) JPN	Akira Miyayama
15	GK	(Brazil) BRA	Guilherme Hasegawa

No.	Pos.	Nation	Player
16	MF	(Philippines) PHI	Anto Gonzales
17	MF	(Philippines) PHI	Arnel Amita
19	MF	(Philippines) PHI	Curt Dizon
23	FW	(Spain) ESP	Alvaro Castiella
25	GK	(Philippines) PHI	Nathanael Villanueva
26	GK	(Philippines) PHI	Tomas Trigo
27	MF	(Philippines) PHI	Jake Morallo
28	GK	(Philippines) PHI	Ricardo Padilla Jr.
33	DF	(Spain) ESP	Joaquín Cañas
34	MF	(Philippines) PHI	Ian Clariño
37	MF	(Philippines) PHI	Daniel Gadia
51	DF	(Philippines) PHI	Kouichi Belgira

=== Overview ===
Competition	Started round	Current position / round	Final position / round	First match	Last match
2016 UFL Cup	Group stage	3rd in Group B	5th	February 6, 2016	April 16, 2015
UFL Division 1	—	—	—	April 25, 2016	September 2016
