= 2012–13 Loyola Meralco Sparks F.C. season =

Loyola Meralco Sparks
2012–13 season
- Chairman: Manuel V. Pangilinan
- Head Coach: Joseph Vicent Santos
- UFL Division 1: 3rd
- PFF Club Championship: Quarter-Finals (lost to Kaya)
- UFL Cup: 3rd
- Top goalscorer: League: Phil Younghusband (17); All: Phil Younghusband (31)
Home colours	Away colours	Third colours

The 2012–13 season is Loyola's 4th season in the Philippines premier league, the UFL Division 1. The club do well last 2012 UFL Cup where they get the third place after defeating Green Archers United, 4–1. They reach the quarterfinals of 2012–13 PFF National Men's Club Championship after they lost to Kaya.

At the start of 2013 UFL season, Vincent Santos took over the coaching duties from Korean Kim Chul-so.

The club finished the 2013 season of the UFL Division 1 third behind Global FC and the champions, Stallion Sta. Lucia. They only reach the quarterfinal round of 2013 Singapore Cup when they bowed out to Tanjong Pagar United in a 5–4 aggregate.

== Current squad ==
As of 10 April 2013

Note: Flags indicate national team as defined under FIFA eligibility rules; some limited exceptions apply. Players may hold more than one non-FIFA nationality.

No.	Pos.	Nation	Player
1	GK	PHI	Ref Cuaresma
3	MF	PHI	Matthew Hartmann
4	DF	PHI	Patrick Ozaeta
5	MF	CMR	Rodrigue Nembot
6	MF	PHI	Matthew Uy
7	MF	PHI	James Younghusband (captain)
8	MF	PHI	Jayson Cutamora
9	DF	PHI	Chad Gould
10	FW	PHI	Phil Younghusband
11	DF	PHI	Roxy Dorlas
12	MF	PHI	Jake Morallo
13	DF	PHI	Armand del Rosario
14	MF	PHI	Simon Greatwich

No.	Pos.	Nation	Player
15	FW	PHI	Alexandro Elnar
16	FW	KOR	Jang Joo-Wong
17	MF	KOR	Park Min-Ho
18	MF	ITA	Davide Cortina
20	MF	KOR	Jeong Byeong-Yeol
22	DF	KOR	Jang Jo-Won
23	FW	PHI	Mark Hartmann
27	DF	PHI	Peter Fadrigalan
31	GK	PHI	Michael Menzi
32	GK	PHI	Mark Sorongon
37	MF	PHI	Angelo Verheye
41	FW	PHI	Freddy Gonzalez

== Competitions ==
=== Friendlies ===
February 23, 2013 Friendly	Loyola (Philippines)	0 – 0	Northern Mariana Islands	Quezon City
16:00 PST		Details		Stadium: FEU-Diliman Football Field

March 28, 2013 Friendly	Loyola (Philippines)	1 – 4	Turkmenistan	Taguig
20:00 PST	Jeong 12'	Details	Şamyradow 37'; Annasahedov 73'; Çoňkaýew 78'; Abylov 80'	Stadium: Emperador Stadium

=== Overview ===
Competition	Started round	Current position / round	Final position / round	First match	Last match
PFF Club Championship	Round of 16	—	Quarter-Finals	January 12, 2013	January 19, 2013
UFL Division 1	—	—	3rd	February 5, 2013	June 11, 2013
UFL Cup	Group Stage	—	3rd	October 11, 2012	December 17, 2012
Singapore Cup	Preliminary round	—	Quarterfinal Round	May 26, 2013	July 28, 2013

=== UFL Division 1 ===
==== League table ====
Pos	Team	Pld	W	D	L	GF	GA	GD	Pts
2	Global	18	14	1	3	47	12	+35	43
3	Loyola	18	11	5	2	50	18	+32	38
4	Kaya	18	8	7	3	35	21	+14	31

Updated to match(es) played on 20 June 2013. Source: rsssf.com, soccerway.com
Rules for classification: 1) Points; 2) Goal Difference; 3) Goals Scored

=== Matches ===
February 5, 2013 1	Philippine Army	1 – 4	Loyola	Manila
17:15 PST	Bretaña 18'	Details	Gonzalez 31'; M. J. Hartmann 40'; Jeong 58'; Gould 69'	Stadium: Rizal Memorial Stadium

February 12, 2013 2	Pachanga Diliman	0 – 1	Loyola	Taguig
17:15 PST		Details	Gonzalez 22'	Stadium: Emperador Stadium

February 21, 2013 3	Philippine Air Force	0 – 4	Loyola	Taguig
19:30 PST		Details	M. A. Hartmann 1', 90'; P. Younghusband 52'; Gonzalez 77'	Stadium: Emperador Stadium

February 28, 2013 4	Loyola	3 – 0	PSG	Taguig
19:30 PST	M. A. Hartmann 17'; Jang Jo-won 46'; P. Younghusband 55'	Details		Stadium: Emperador Stadium

March 5, 2013 5	Loyola	1 – 1	Kaya	Taguig
19:30 PST	P. Younghusband 62'	Details	Iliff 88'	Stadium: Emperador Stadium

March 12, 2013 6	Loyola	5 – 0	Manila Nomads	Taguig
19:30 PST	M. A. Hartmann 37', 64'; Gould 41'; S. Greatwich 69'; P. Younghusband 89'	Details		Stadium: Emperador Stadium

March 19, 2013 7	Loyola	2 – 0	Green Archers United	Taguig
17:15 PST	Jeong 28'; M. A. Hartmann 81'	Details		Stadium: Emperador Stadium

April 2, 2013 8	Loyola	1 – 1	Global	Taguig
19:30 PST	P. Younghusband 76' (pen.)	Details; Report	Reichelt 10'	Stadium: Emperador Stadium

April 9, 2013 9	Stallion Sta. Lucia	4 – 2	Loyola	Taguig
19:30 PST	Sanchez 37', 56'; Lee Joo-young 51'; Alquiros 90+7'	Details	P. Younghusband 30'; M. A. Hartmann 38'	Stadium: Emperador Stadium

April 16, 2013 10	Loyola	10 – 1	Philippine Army	Taguig
17:15 PST	M. A. Hartmann 3', 76', 78', 90+2'; P. Younghusband 41' (pen.), 61', 72', 88'; Jang Joo-wong 53'; M. J. Hartmann 73'	Details	Luisito Brillantes 21'	Stadium: Emperador Stadium

April 23, 2013 11	Loyola	4 – 1	Pachanga Diliman	Taguig
17:15 PST	Jeong 14'; P. Younghusband 51' (pen.), 54'; M. A. Hartmann 64'	Details	Clariño 79'	Stadium: Emperador Stadium

April 30, 2013 12	Loyola	2 – 0	Philippine Air Force	Taguig
19:30 PST	J. Younghusband 17'; P. Younghusband 79' (pen.)	Details		Stadium: Emperador Stadium

May 9, 2013 13	PSG	2 – 4	Loyola	Taguig
19:30 PST	Mbata 21'; Yaogo 90+2'	Details; Report	Jeong 13'; P. Younghusband 47', 80'; M. J. Hartmann 60'	Stadium: Emperador Stadium

May 14, 2013 14	Kaya	3 – 1	Loyola	Taguig
19:30 PST	C. Greatwich 20', 57' del Rosario 45'	Details	J. Younghusband 34'	Stadium: Emperador Stadium

May 21, 2013 15	Manila Nomads	2 – 2	Loyola	Taguig
19:30 PST	Mabanag 28'; Magassa 48'	Details	Jeong 43'; M. A. Hartmann 46'	Stadium: Emperador Stadium

May 30, 2013 16	Green Archers United	1 – 1	Loyola	Taguig
19:30 PST	Caligdong 3' (pen.)	Details	P. Younghusband 52' (pen.)	Stadium: Emperador Stadium

June 6, 2013 17	Global	0 – 2	Loyola	Taguig
19:30 PST		Details; Report	M. A. Hartmann 11'; P. Younghusband 72'	Stadium: Emperador Stadium

June 11, 2013 18	Loyola	1 – 1	Stallion Sta. Lucia	Taguig
19:30 PST	J. Younghusband 45+2'	Details	Lee Joo-Young 17'	Stadium: Emperador Stadium

=== UFL Cup ===
October 11, 2012 Stage 2-Group C	Laos	1 – 2	Loyola	Makati
19:00 PST	Villanueva 84'	Report	Gould 14'; J. Younghusband 45+1'	Stadium: University of Makati Stadium

October 20, 2012 Stage 2-Group C	Pachanga Diliman	2 – 1	Loyola	Makati
20:00 PST	Appiah 59'; Zerrudo 70'	Report	Jeong 43'	Stadium: University of Makati Stadium

October 23, 2012 Stage 2-Group C	Loyola	8 – 1	Manila Nomads	Manila
19:30 PST	P. Younghusband 17', 29', 70'; Jeong 40'; J. Younghusband 49'; Gonzales 58'; Morallo 75', 80'	Report	Cardoso 8'	Stadium: Rizal Memorial Stadium

November 5, 2012 Stage 2-Group C	Mendiola FC 1991	0 – 12	Loyola	Makati
19:30 PST			P. Younghusband 8', 22', 34', 76', 86'; Jeong 12', 53'; Jang Jo-won 32'; M. A. Hartmann 40'; Gould 57'; Fadrigalan 71'; Wong 82'	Stadium: University of Makati Stadium

November 8, 2012 Quarter-finals	Loyola	5 – 0	Philippine Army	Makati
17:00 PST	M. A. Hartmann 6', 76', 80'; Jeong 32'; P. Younghusband 69'	Report		Stadium: University of Makati Stadium

November 13, 2012 Semi-finals	Global	2 – 1	Loyola	Manila
17:00 PST	Obiang 6'; I. Elhabbib 83'	Report	J. Younghusband 86'	Stadium: Rizal Memorial Stadium

December 17, 2012 Third-place playoff	Loyola	4 – 1	Green Archers United	Manila
17:00 PST	M. A. Hartmann 14', 29'; Jeong 23'; P. Younghusband 62'	Report	Ayi 10'	Stadium: Rizal Memorial Stadium

=== PFF National Men's Club Championship ===
January 12, 2013 Round of 16	Flame United FC	0 – 8	Loyola	Manila
16:00 PST		Details	M. A. Hartmann 18', 25'; J. Younghusband 38'; M. J. Hartmann 49', 72', 86'; P. Younghusband 67', 76'	Stadium: Rizal Memorial Stadium

January 19, 2013 Quarter-Finals	Kaya	1 – 0	Loyola	Manila
18:30 PST	Porteria 58'	Details		Stadium: Rizal Memorial Stadium

=== Singapore Cup ===
May 26, 2013 Preliminary round	Loyola (Philippines)	3 – 0	(Malaysia) Harimau Muda B	Singapore
19:30 SST	P. Younghusband 18' (pen.), 80'; Jang Joo-wong 40'	Details		Stadium: Jalan Besar Stadium; Referee: Abdul Malik

July 25, 2013 Quarterfinal Round First leg	Tanjong Pagar United (Singapore)	2 – 1	(Philippines) Loyola	Singapore
20:00 SST	Zerka 6'; Benahmed 18'	Details	J. Younghusband 26'	Stadium: Queenstown Stadium; Referee: Jansen Foo

July 28, 2013 Quarterfinal Round Second leg	Loyola (Philippines)	3 – 3 (4–5 agg.)	(Singapore) Tanjong Pagar United	Singapore
20:00 SST	Park 37'; Jang Jo-won 40'; Gould 90+4'	Details	Benahmed 45'; Nor 56'; Ramdani 75'	Stadium: Jalan Besar Stadium; Referee: Sukhbir Singh
