= UFL FA League Cup =

- Organizer(s): Football Alliance
- Founded: 2014
- Abolished: 2014
- Region: Philippines
- Teams: 14
- Most championships: Ceres (1 title)
- Broadcaster: AksyonTV

The United Football League FA League Cup, commonly known as UFL FA League Cup, was a Filipino association football competition. It was played on a multistage format that culminates in a knockout stage (single elimination). Clubs that were eligible to compete for the cup were those who then played in the United Football League's two divisions. The only edition of this tournament was part of the 2014–15 United Football League season, preceding the league proper and the ULF Cup, the pre-existing and separate cup tournament.

== 2014 edition ==
2014 UFL FA League Cup
Tournament details
- Country: Philippines
- Dates: September 20 - November 6, 2014
- Teams: 14

Final positions
- Champions: Ceres
- Runners-up: Global

Tournament statistics
- Matches played: 50
- Goals scored: 232 (4.64 per match)
- Top goal scorer(s): (England) Louis Max Clark (Philippines) Mark Hartmann (10 goals)

Awards
- Best player: (South Korea) Jin Ho Kim

The 2014 United Football League FA League Cup was the first and only edition of the tournament. The competition started on September 20 and ended on November 6, 2014.

=== Competition format ===
The 14 clubs were separated into two groups of seven, where the top four advanced to the quarterfinals. Separate draws took place before the quarterfinals and semi-finals to determine which clubs will face off.

=== Group stage ===
Key to colours in group tables
Top four placed teams advance to the knock out stage

All times are Philippine Standard Time (PST) – UTC+8.

==== Group A ====
Team	Pld	W	D	L	GF	GA	GD	Pts
Ceres	6	6	0	0	18	4	+14	18
Loyola	6	5	0	1	17	9	+8	15
Stallion	6	3	1	2	15	15	0	10
Pachanga Diliman	6	3	0	3	15	16	−1	9
Green Archers United	6	1	2	3	10	16	−6	5
Manila Jeepney	6	1	1	4	13	15	−2	4
Philippine Army	6	0	0	6	7	19	−12	0

September 20, 2014	Stallion	1–0	Philippine Army	Rizal Memorial Stadium
14:15	Arboleda 20'	Report

September 20, 2014	Manila Jeepney	2–2	Green Archers United	Rizal Memorial Stadium
17:15	Kouassi 5'; Taher 90+1'	Report	Mendy 53'; Melliza 68'

September 20, 2014	Pachanga Diliman	0–4	Ceres	Rizal Memorial Stadium
20:15		Report	Okunaiya 38'; Gallardo 39', 66'; Reichelt 90+2'

September 23, 2014	Stallion	2–4	Ceres	Rizal Memorial Stadium
17:15	Mintah 12'; Carrascosa 62'	Report	Gallardo 14'; Reichelt 50', 57'; Guirado 70'

23 September 2014	Philippine Army	1 – 3	Loyola	Emperador Stadium
17:15 UTC+8	Jeon Shin Seok 77'		J. Younghusband 11', 51'; Hartmann 63'

23 September 2014	Manila Jeepney	3 – 4	Pachanga Diliman	Rizal Memorial Stadium
20:15 UTC+8	Ngnan Koffi Kouassi 6', 53'; Jahanbakhsh Taher 56'	Report	Behrous Khoshgavar 5'; Jinggoy Valmayor 22', 70'; Yi Young Park 35'

28 September 2014	Loyola	3 – 0	Green Archers United	Rizal Memorial Stadium
14:15 UTC+8	J. Younghusband 24', 39'; Caygill 86'	Report

30 September 2014	Green Archers United	1 – 4	Pachanga Diliman	Emperador Stadium
20:15 UTC+8	Robert Lopez Mendy 45'	Report	Hamed Hajimahdi 34'; Shayan Dastjerdi 54'; Gerardo Valmayor 71'; Andoni Santos 90+3'

2 October 2014	Philippine Army	4 – 5	Manila Jeepney	Rizal Memorial Stadium
17:15 UTC+8	Nestorio Margarse Jr. 18'; Shin Seok Jeon 56', 65'; Dae Han Kang 80'	Report	Alvaro Alonso 3', 42'; Eric Ben Giganto 27', 60'; Ngnan Koffi Kouassi 71'

2 October 2014	Ceres	1 – 0	Loyola	Rizal Memorial Stadium
20:15 UTC+8	Jin Ho Kim 22'	Report

14 October 2014	Green Archers United	3 – 3	Stallion	Rizal Memorial Stadium
17:15 UTC+8	Reynald Villareal 68'; Pasilan 70'; Robert Lopez Mendy 86'	Report	Rota 34'; Belinga Blanchard 44'; Angel Carrascosa 75'

14 October 2014	Loyola	3 – 2	Pachanga Diliman	Rizal Memorial Stadium
20:15 UTC+8	J. Younghusband 65'; P. Younghusband 90+1'; Caygill 90+2'	Report	Gerardo Valmayor 46', 49'

14 October 2014	Ceres	3 – 2	Manila Jeepney	Emperador Stadium
17:15 UTC+8	Jin Ho Kim 43'; Adrian Gallardo 49'; Sabio 57'	Report	Angelo Jurao 57'; Arnel Amita 68'

18 October 2014	Green Archers United	4 – 1	Philippine Army	Emperador Stadium
14:15 UTC+8	Robert Lopez Mendy 45+1'; Jovanie Simpron 46'; Jesse Martindale 60'; Caligdong 70'		Shin Seok Jeon 72'

18 October 2014	Pachanga Diliman	2 – 4	Stallion	Emperador Stadium
17:15 UTC+8	Yi Young Park 31', 33'		Mario Javier Clarino 3'; Rota 5'; Angel Carrascosa 47', 85'

18 October 2014	Manila Jeepney	1 – 2	Loyola	Emperador Stadium
20:15 UTC+8	Alvaro Alonso 76'		Max Wright 2'; P. Younghusband 49'

20 October 2014	Stallion	1 – 0	Manila Jeepney	Emperador Stadium
20:15 UTC+8	Nana Thomert 89'	Report

21 October 2014	Ceres	3 – 0	Green Archers United	Rizal Memorial Stadium
20:15 UTC+8	Jin Ho Kim 19'; Adrian Gallardo 39', 45'	Report

21 October 2014	Pachanga Diliman	3 – 1	Philippine Army	Emperador Stadium
20:15 UTC+8	Jeong Woo Lee 33'; Gerardo Valmayor 71'; Raffy Cabug 87'	Report	Shin Seok Jeon 9'

23 October 2014	Philippine Army	0 – 3	Ceres	Rizal Memorial Stadium
14:15 UTC+8		Report	Kyum Son Cho 22', 50', 54'

23 October 2014	Loyola	6 – 4	Stallion	Rizal Memorial Stadium
17:15 UTC+8	Freddy Gonzalez 45'; Charlie Beaton 65'; Max Wright 68'; P. Younghusband 76', 90+2'; Caygill 89'	Report	Jordan Mintah 32'; Nguene Landry 63'; Mario Javier Clarino 70', 79'

==== Group B ====
Team	Pld	W	D	L	GF	GA	GD	Pts
Kaya	6	5	1	0	28	4	+24	16
Global	6	5	0	1	31	2	+29	15
Laos	6	3	1	2	11	5	+6	10
Manila All-Japan	6	2	2	2	25	21	+4	7
Team Socceroo	6	2	1	3	6	11	−5	7
Forza	6	1	1	3	5	15	−10	4
Dolphins United	6	0	0	6	4	52	−48	0

21 September 2014	Kaya	9 – 1	Dolphins United	Rizal Memorial Stadium
14:15 UTC+8	Louis Max Clark 9', 37', 43', 49'; C. Greatwich 21'; Porteria 23'; Daniels 52'; Christian Egba 85'; Janrick Soriano 88'	Report	Jaybone Herva 63'

21 September 2014	Team Socceroo	0 – 3	Laos	Rizal Memorial Stadium
17:15 UTC+8		Report	Patrick Franksson 35'; Finn Gumela 75'; Jamal Lord 90'

21 September 2014	Manila All-Japan	1 – 1	Forza	Rizal Memorial Stadium
20:15 UTC+8	Chichiro Noda 23'	Report	Jangobah Johnson 87'

23 September 2014	Dolphins United	0 – 12	Global	Emperador Stadium
20:15 UTC+8		Report	Milad Behgandom 1'; Izzeldin El Habbib 8', 17', 23', 41'; Hartmann 46', 62', 64'; Edgar Briones 47', 74', 85'; Yu Hoshide 81'

25 September 2014	Kaya	5 – 0	Forza	Rizal Memorial Stadium
17:15 UTC+8	Louis Max Clark 35', 49', 65'; Jovin Bedic 78'; Christian Egba 89'	Report

25 September 2014	Team Socceroo	1 – 1	Manila All-Japan	Rizal Memorial Stadium
20:15 UTC+8	Rogie Maglinas 90+2'	Report	Jenno Aquino 33'

27 September 2014	Global	1 – 0	Laos	Rizal Memorial Stadium
14:15 UTC+8	Hikaru Minegishi 82'

27 September 2014	Dolphins United	1 – 4	Forza	Rizal Memorial Stadium
17:15 UTC+8	Rey Miravite 48'		Javier Ramos 17'; Arvin Gaspe 45', 60'; Jangobah Johnson 62'

27 September 2014	Kaya	4 – 0	Team Socceroo	Rizal Memorial Stadium
20:15 UTC+8	Louis Max Clark 7', 13', 42'; C. Greatwich 17'

30 September 2014	Dolphins United	1 – 2	Team Socceroo	Rizal Memorial Stadium
17:15 UTC+8	John Paul Dela Paz 40'	Report	Paolo Casambre 35'; Masood Shadideh 57'

30 September 2014	Forza	0 – 3	Global	Rizal Memorial Stadium
20:15 UTC+8		Report	Hartmann 27'; Edgar Briones 66'; Rodríguez 85'

5 October 2014	Laos	0 – 2	Manila All-Japan	Emperador Stadium
20:15 UTC+8			Yugo Kobayashi 60', 66'

14 October 2014	Forza	0 – 3	Team Socceroo	Emperador Stadium
20:15 UTC+8		Report	Jerome Cuyos 14'; Masood Shadideh 32'; Beleu Cleopas 53'

16 October 2014	Laos	1 – 1	Kaya	Rizal Memorial Stadium
17:15 UTC+8	Mark Valeroso 13'		Porteria 90'

16 October 2014	Global	12 – 0	Manila All-Japan	Rizal Memorial Stadium
20:15 UTC+8	Dizon 9'; Bahadoran 18', 54'; Hartmann 25', 28', 34', 46'; Dennis Villanueva 50'; Sato 59'; Edgar Briones 68', 77'; Paolo Bugas 83'	Report

19 October 2014	Laos	5 – 1	Dolphins United	Rizal Memorial Stadium
14:15 UTC+8	John Regis 7'; Alex Obiang 8'; Ange Guisso 18'; Ryan Buenaflor 70'; Patrick Franksson 79'	Report	Yves Fono Simo 43'

19 October 2014	Manila All-Japan	1 – 7	Kaya	Rizal Memorial Stadium
17:15 UTC+8	Darryl Regala 81'	Report	Greatwich 3', 25'; Emmanuel Mbata 18', 55'; Porteria 58'; Rocky Plaza 66'; Janrick Soriano 90+1'

19 October 2014	Team Socceroo	0 – 2	Global	Rizal Memorial Stadium
20:15 UTC+8	Report	Report	Otomo 87', 90+1'

21 October 2014	Manila All-Japan	20 – 0	Dolphins United	Emperador Stadium
17:15 UTC+8	Chihiro Noda 10', 11', 21', 23', 30', 39', 55'; Fidel Kue 28'; Kobayashi 29', 43', 45', 46', 49', 58'; Ed Merill Walohan 35', 56'; Ryohei Kamon 36', 38', 41'; Renando Mantua Jr. 53'	Report

21 October 2014	Forza	0 – 2	Laos	Rizal Memorial Stadium
17:15 UTC+8		Report	Alex Obiang 9'; Aaron Altiche 55'

23 October 2014	Global	1 – 2	Kaya	Rizal Memorial Stadium
20:15 UTC+8	Milad Behgandom 65'	Report	Younousse Yaogo 14'; Barrera 17'

=== Knockout stage ===
==== Quarter-finals ====
In the quarter-finals stage, matchups were made via random draw. They will play against one another in a single leg knockout basis. The draw for the quarter-finals round was held on October 23, 2014. After the quarterfinals, another random draw will determine semifinal pairings.

Team 1	Score	Team 2
Ceres	3 - 1	Stallion
Global	3 - 0	Laos
Pachanga Diliman	2 - 1 a.e.t.	Manila All-Japan
Kaya	1 - 2	Loyola

26 October 2014	Ceres	3 – 1	Stallion	Rizal Memorial Stadium
17:15 UTC+8	Adrian Gallardo 34'; Carli de Murga 38'; Kyum Son Cho 87'		Belinga Blanchard 52'

26 October 2014	Global	3 – 0	Laos	Rizal Memorial Stadium
20:15 UTC+8	Hartmann 9'; Hikaru Minegishi 72'; Milad Behgandom 90'

27 October 2014	Pachanga Diliman	2 – 1 (a.e.t.)	Manila All-Japan	Rizal Memorial Stadium
17:15 UTC+8	Khozshgavar Behrouz 45'; Jeong Woo Lee 100'		Kobayashi 87'

27 October 2014	Kaya	1 – 2	Loyola	Rizal Memorial Stadium
20:15 UTC+8	Barrera 33'		P. Younghusband 24', 50'

==== Semi-finals ====
Team 1	Score	Team 2
Loyola	1 - 2	Global
Ceres	3 - 1	Pachanga Diliman

4 November 2014	Loyola	1 – 2	Global	Rizal Memorial Stadium
17:15 UTC+8	P. Younghusband 90+4'	Report	Edgar Briones 85'; Izo El Habbib 90+3'

4 November 2014	Ceres	3 – 1	Pachanga Diliman	Rizal Memorial Stadium
20:15 UTC+8	Sabio 23'; Adrian Gallardo 86'; Ott 86'	Report	Yi Young Park 7'

==== Third-place playoff ====
Team 1	Score	Team 2
Loyola	3 - 1	Pachanga Diliman

6 November 2014	Loyola	3 – 1	Pachanga Diliman	Rizal Memorial Stadium
16:45 UTC+8	Jamal Fenelon 18'; Charlie Beaton 21'; Reuben Silitonga 43'	Report	Hajimahdi Hamed 33'

==== Final ====
Team 1	Score	Team 2
Global	1 - 2	Ceres

6 November 2014	Global	1 – 2	Ceres	Rizal Memorial Stadium
20:15 UTC+8	Hartmann 69'	Report	Jin Ho Kim 1'; Adrian Gallardo 21'

=== Top goalscorers ===
Rank	Player	Club	Goals
1	(England) Louis Max Clark	Kaya	10
1	(Philippines) Mark Hartmann	Global	10
3	(Japan) Yugo Kobayashi	Manila All-Japan	9
3	(Spain) Adrian Gallardo	Ceres	9
5	(Japan) Chichiro Noda	Manila All-Japan	8
6	(Philippines) Phil Younghusband	Loyola	7
6	(Philippines) Edgar Briones	Global	7
8	(Philippines) Jinggoy Valmayor	Pachanga Diliman	6
9	(Philippines) James Younghusband	Loyola	5
9	(South Korea) Shin Seok Jeon	Philippine Army	5

Correct as of 11:30, November 6, 2014

=== Awards ===
The following were the competition's top individual awardees.

- Golden Gloves: (Philippines) Patrick Deyto (Global)
- Golden Boot: (England) Louis Max Clark (Kaya)
- Golden Ball: (South Korea) Jin Ho Kim (Ceres)
