= 2013 UFL Pre-season Cup =

Tournament details
- Country: Philippines
- Dates: 7 September to 10 October 2013
- Teams: 15

Final positions
- Champions: Loyola
- Runner-up: Global

Tournament statistics
- Matches played: 38
- Goals scored: 168 (4.42 per match)
- Top goal scorer(s): Rufo Sanchez; Shayan Jafari Dastjeri (8)

The 2013 UFL Pre-Season Cup is the inaugural Filipino association football friendly tournament. It is composed of 14 United Football League teams from, 7 Division I and 7 Division II clubs, with the aim of getting the teams some competitive games going into the UFL Cup. It also features the U-23 Azkals as their preparation for the upcoming 2013 Southeast Asian Games. Loyola declared as the cup winner by default against Global.

== Format ==
The tournament begins with three groups of five teams playing round-robin. The two teams per group with the best record then move on. Those six qualifying teams will then be split into two groups of three for the second group stage, which will also see round-robin play. From there, the top two teams of each group will be drawn into the semifinals, with pairings to be arranged at a later date.

== First round ==
All times are in Philippine Standard Time (PST) – UTC+8.

=== Group A ===
Team	Pld	W	D	L	GF	GA	GD	Pts
Global	4	4	0	0	27	3	+24	12
Green Archers United	4	3	0	1	14	5	+9	9
Union Internacional Manila	4	2	0	2	15	11	+4	6
Laos	4	1	0	3	5	23	−18	3
Manila All-Japan	4	0	0	4	2	24	−22	0

8 September 2013	Green Archers United	2 – 1	Union Internacional Manila	Emperador Stadium
18:00 UTC+8	Mohammed 45' (o.g.); Caligdong 90+1'	Source	Shayan 9'

8 September 2013	Global	8 – 0	Laos	Emperador Stadium
20:00 UTC+8	Bahadoran 30' de Murga 34'; Guirado 36', 38'; Starosta 40'; Hoshide 42'; El Habbib 65'; Altiche 89'	Source

10 September 2013	Manila All-Japan	1 – 3	Laos	Emperador Stadium
19:00 UTC+8	Tanaka 26'	Source	Buenaflor 1'; Lear 36'; Sandoval 50'

10 September 2013	Green Archers United	1 – 2	Global	Emperador Stadium
21:00 UTC+8	Caligdong 87'	Source	Hartmann 56'; Guirado 82'

14 September 2013	Manila All-Japan	0 – 3	Green Archers United	Emperador Stadium
21:00 UTC+8		Source	Caligdong 23'; Villareal 45'; Bacobo 80'

14 September 2013	Union Internacional Manila	1 – 6	Global	Emperador Stadium
21:00 UTC+8	Behgandom 83'	Source	Rufo 1', 6', 29'; I. El Habbib 60', 86'; Altiche 70'

18 September 2013	Union Internacional Manila	7 – 0	Manila All-Japan	Emperador Stadium
19:00 UTC+8	Behgandom 22', 41'; Shayan 24', 30', 46', 55'; Mahdavi 57'	Source

18 September 2013	Laos	2 – 8	Green Archers United	Emperador Stadium
21:00 UTC+8	Ghasemi 55' 67'	Source	Melliza 6'; Caligdong 20', 37'; Garcia 21'; Olowoyeye 43' Bertotto 77', 86'; Bacobo 51'

21 September 2013	Global	11 – 1	Manila All-Japan	Emperador Stadium
19:00 UTC+8	Rufo 24', 29', 48', 64', 68'; El Habbib 33', 66', 75'; Guirado 83'; Aguinaldo 83'; Altiche 89'		Sugisaki 31'

21 September 2013	Laos	3 – 6	Union Internacional Manila	Emperador Stadium
21:00 UTC+8	Franksson 20'; Ghasemi 24', 28'		Shayan 7', 16', 90+2'; Hassan 27'; Behgadom 35'; Bertotto 39' (pen.)

=== Group B ===
Team	Pld	W	D	L	GF	GA	GD	Pts
Loyola Meralco Sparks	3	3	0	0	18	2	+16	9
Manila Nomads	3	2	1	0	8	2	+6	7
Pachanga Diliman	4	1	2	1	10	5	+5	5
Philippine Army	3	0	1	2	3	13	−10	1
Dolphins United	3	0	0	3	0	17	−17	0

7 September 2013	Pachanga Diliman	2 – 2	Manila Nomads	Emperador Stadium
14:00 UTC+8	Burkey 38'; Diop 47'	Source	Weidmar 58'; Peralta 88'

7 September 2013	Loyola	9 – 2	Philippine Army	Emperador Stadium
16:00 UTC+8	Joo Young 3'; P. Younghusband 18', 26', 32' (pen.); Hartmann 32', 67'; J. Younghusband 35'; Morallo 57'; Gould 69'	Source	Gener 42'; Becite 50'

11 September 2013	Dolphins United	0 – 7	Loyola	Emperador Stadium
19:00 UTC+8		Source	Gould 5'; P. Younghusband 50', 63', 85'; Joo Young 69', 83'; Bugas 87'

11 September 2013	Pachanga Diliman	1 – 1	Philippine Army	Emperador Stadium
21:00 UTC+8	Valmayor 64'	Source	Bretaña 46'

14 September 2013	Manila Nomads	3 – 0 Awarded (Note: The UFL declared Manila Nomads as the winner by default as stated in the UFL official Twitter account.)	Philippine Army	Emperador Stadium
20:00 UTC+8

14 September 2013	Dolphins United	0 – 7	Pachanga Diliman	Emperador Stadium
20:00 UTC+8		Source	Santos 9', 62'; Burkey 14' 38'; Cutamora 20'; Valmayor 70', 71'

17 September 2013	Manila Nomads	3 – 0	Dolphins United	Emperador Stadium
18:00 UTC+8	Magassa 45', 73'; Borrill 58'	Source

17 September 2013	Loyola	2 – 0	Pachanga Diliman	Emperador Stadium
16:00 UTC+8	J. Younghusband 84', 90+2' (pen.)	Source

The remaining matches for Group B was postponed due to weather condition and safety concerns as cited by the UFL official Facebook and Twitter account. However, the said matches was not played without further details and the cup proceed to the second round.

=== Group C ===
Team	Pld	W	D	L	GF	GA	GD	Pts
Kaya	4	3	1	0	8	3	+5	10
Stallion	4	2	0	2	8	6	+2	6
Philippines U-23	4	2	0	2	5	7	−2	6
Forza	4	1	1	2	3	4	−1	4
Philippine Navy	4	1	0	3	6	10	−4	3

7 September 2013	Forza	0 – 2	Philippines U-23	Emperador Stadium
18:00 UTC+8		Sources	Hartmann 56' (pen.); Fornea 64'

7 September 2013	Stallion	4 – 0	Philippine Navy	Emperador Stadium
20:00 UTC+8	Doctora 6'; Clariño 36'; Barrera 62'; Ignacio 69'	Source

12 September 2013	Kaya	3 – 1	Stallion	Emperador Stadium
19:00 UTC+8	D. de Jong 34'; C. Greatwich 44'; Daniels 85'	Source	Alquiros 90+1'

12 September 2013	Forza	3 – 1	Philippine Navy	Emperador Stadium
21:00 UTC+8	Burda 12'; Pascual 48'; Adebando 57'	Source	Ruben 17' (o.g.)

15 September 2013	Philippine Navy	3 – 0 Awarded (Note: Referee declared the match in favored of Philippine Navy as a result of Philippines U-23 unable to field their starting eleven upon kick-off cited by UFL official Twitter account.)	Philippines U-23	Emperador Stadium
18:00 UTC+8

15 September 2013	Kaya	0 – 0	Forza	Emperador Stadium
21:00 UTC+8		Sources

19 September 2013	Stallion	1 – 0	Forza	Emperador Stadium
19:00 UTC+8	Park Bo Bae 10'	Sources

19 September 2013	Philippines U-23	0 – 2	Kaya	Emperador Stadium
21:00 UTC+8		Sources	Baganski 84'; Ugarte 89'

21 September 2013	Philippine Navy	2 – 3	Kaya	Emperador Stadium
15:00 UTC+8	Viliran 6'; Leyble 81'	Sources	Omura 53'; Ugarte 56'; Arceo 86'

21 September 2013	Stallion	2 – 3	Philippines U-23	Emperador Stadium
17:00 UTC+8	Hohn 47'; Clariño 79'	Sources	Christiaens 46'; Fornea 61'; Torres 69' (o.g.)

== Second round ==
=== Group D ===
Team	Pld	W	D	L	GF	GA	GD	Pts
Green Archers United	2	1	0	1	5	3	+2	3
Manila Nomads	2	1	0	1	5	5	0	3
Stallion	2	1	0	1	4	6	−2	3

23 September 2013	Manila Nomads	5 – 1	Stallion	Emperador Stadium
18:00 UTC+8	Magassa 25', 55'; Clottey 73'; Hwedi 83'; Diouff 88'	Source	Alquiros 82'

25 September 2013	Stallion	3 – 1	Green Archers United	Emperador Stadium
19:00 UTC+8	Barrera 43', 80'; Park Bo Bae 87'	Source	Pasilan 7'

27 September 2013	Green Archers United	4 – 0	Manila Nomads	Emperador Stadium
19:00 UTC+8	Caligdong 6'; Pasilan 16'; Melliza 75'; Garcia 90+2'	Source

=== Group E ===
Team	Pld	W	D	L	GF	GA	GD	Pts
Loyola	2	1	0	1	4	2	+2	3
Global	2	1	0	1	4	3	+1	3
Kaya	2	1	0	1	2	5	−3	3

23 September 2013	Global	0 – 3 Awarded (Note: UFL Disciplinary Committee awarded Loyola a 3–0 win as a result of Global fielding the ineligible player Rufo Sánchez. The match originally ended 3–1 in favor to Global.)	Loyola	Emperador Stadium
20:00 UTC+8		Source

25 September 2013	Global	4 – 0	Kaya	Emperador Stadium
21:00 UTC+8	Christiaens 36'; Bahadoran 62'; I. Elhabib 69'; A. Guirado 88'	Source

27 September 2013	Kaya	2 – 1	Loyola	Emperador Stadium
21:00 UTC+8	D. De Jong 38'; Mbata 82'	Source	Ashime 20'

== Knockout stage ==
Semi-finals
October 6 – Taguig City
Loyola	2
Manila Nomads	0
October 6 - Taguig City
Green Archers United	1
Global	2

Final
October 10 - Taguig City
Loyola (Awarded) (Note: The UFL awarded Loyola a 3–0 win by default after Global failed to show up for the championship game Thursday night at the Emperador Stadium in McKinley Hill.)	3
Global	0
Third place
October 8 - Taguig City
Manila Nomads	0
Green Archers United	1

=== Semi-finals ===
6 October 2013	Loyola	2 – 0	Manila Nomads	Emperador Stadium
17:00 UTC+8	P. Younghusband 15'; Bonney 21'	Source

6 October 2013	Green Archers United	1 – 2	Global	Emperador Stadium
19:00 UTC+8	Martindale 65'	Source	Bahadoran 60'; Yao 90+1'

=== Third place playoff ===
8 October 2013	Manila Nomads	0 – 1	Green Archers United	Emperador Stadium
19:00 UTC+8			Villareal 30'

=== Finals ===
10 October 2013	Global	0 – 3 Awarded	Loyola	Emperador Stadium
18:00 UTC+8

== Top goalscorers ==
The top scorers of the tournament are as follows:

Rank	Name	Team	Goals
1	(Spain) Rufo Sanchez	Global	8
1	(Iran) Shayan Jafari Dastjeri	Union Internacional Manila	8
2	(Philippines) Phil Younghusband	Loyola	7
2	(Sudan) Izzeldin El Habbib	Global	7
3	(Philippines) Chieffy Caligdong	Green Archers United	6
4	(Philippines) Angel Guirado	Global	5
5	(Iran) Milad Behgandom	Union Internacional Manila	4
5	(Libya) Mohammad Ghasemi	Laos	4
