= 2011–12 Loyola Meralco Sparks F.C. season =

Loyola Meralco Sparks
2011/12 season
- Chairman: Manuel V. Pangilinan
- Head Coach: Kim Chul-soo
- UFL Division 1: 3rd
- UFL Cup: 2nd
- Singapore Cup: 4th (lost to Gombak United)
- Top goalscorer: League: Phil Younghusband (23); All: Phil Younghusband (49)
Home colours	Away colours	Third colours

The 2011/12 season was Loyola's 3rd season in the Philippines premier league, the UFL. The club competed in the Division 1 of the United Football League where they finished 3rd. The club also competed in the 2011 UFL Cup and finished second place behind Philippine Air Force.

The club was also invited to play in 2012 Singapore Cup and finished fourth place after they suffered a defeat against Gombak United on the third-place playoff match.

== Squad ==
Note: Flags indicate national team as defined under FIFA eligibility rules; some limited exceptions apply. Players may hold more than one non-FIFA nationality.

No.	Pos.	Nation	Player
1	GK	PHI	Ref Cuaresma
3	MF	PHI	Matthew Hartmann
4	DF	PHI	Patrick Ozaeta (Vice-captain)
5	DF	PHI	Dexter Versario
6	MF	PHI	Anto Gonzales (on loan from Diliman)
7	MF	PHI	James Younghusband (Captain)
8	MF	PHI	Jayson Cutamora
10	FW	PHI	Phil Younghusband
11	DF	PHI	Roxy Dorlas
12	MF	PHI	Jake Morallo
13	MF	KOR	Jang Jo-Won
14	MF	KOR	Kim Hyo-Il
15	FW	PHI	Alexandro Elnar

No.	Pos.	Nation	Player
17	MF	KOR	Park Min-Ho
18	MF	ITA	Davide Cortina
19	GK	PHI	Rolando Cabaniero
20	MF	KOR	Jeong Byeong-Yeol
22	DF	PHI	Eliezer Fabraoda
23	FW	PHI	Mark Hartmann
25	MF	PHI	Gabriel Borja
26	FW	LBR	Alex Camara
27	FW	PHI	Alvin Valeroso
28	GK	ECU	Gabriel Vorbeck
33	DF	PHI	Amani Manuel Aguinaldo
-	GK	PHI	Michael Menzi
-	MF	KOR	Kim Jung-Kyum

=== Out on loan ===
Note: Flags indicate national team as defined under FIFA eligibility rules; some limited exceptions apply. Players may hold more than one non-FIFA nationality.

No.	Pos.	Nation	Player
21	DF	PHI	Darren Hartmann (at Manila Nomads)

== Competitions ==
=== Overview ===
Competition	Started round	Current position / round	Final position / round	First match	Last match
UFL Division 1	—	—	3rd	January 14, 2012	June 26, 2012
UFL Cup	Group stage	—	2nd	October 15, 2011	December 10, 2011
Singapore Cup	Preliminary round	—	4th	May 18, 2012	October 28, 2012

=== UFL Division 1 ===
==== League table ====
Pos	Team	Pld	W	D	L	GF	GA	GD	Pts
2	Kaya	18	13	3	2	30	17	+13	42
3	Loyola	18	11	4	3	64	27	+37	37
4	Stallion	18	8	5	5	37	20	+17	29

Updated to match(es) played on 30 June 2012. Source: rsssf.com, soccerway.com
Rules for classification: 1) Points; 2) Goal Difference; 3) Goals Scored

=== Matches ===
January 14, 2012 1	Green Archers United	2 – 3	Loyola	Manila
18:00 PST	Fraire (yellow card) 45'; Pasinabo 67'; Johnson (yellow card) 76'; Villareal 77'	Report	P. Younghusband 35', 45'; Jeong 54'; Yoshioka (red card) 63'	Stadium: Rizal Memorial Stadium

January 22, 2012 2	Philippine Army	1 – 2	Loyola	Parañaque
16:30 PST	Cain (yellow card) 17'; Bretaña (yellow card) 29'; Pelayo 30'; Gener (yellow card) 40'	Report	M.A. Hartmann 18'; M.J. Hartmann (yellow card) 34'; Cortina (yellow card) 78'; J. Younghusband 79' (yellow card) 89'	Stadium: Nomads Sports Club

January 28, 2012 3	Stallion	4 – 1	Loyola	Manila
16:00 PST	Albor 14' (yellow card) 79'; Doctora 17'; Hugo (yellow card) 56'; Yoon 70'; Pi (yellow card) 78'; Lee 86'	Report	P. Younghusband 10' (red card) 79'; Versario (yellow card) 27'; Fabraoda (yellow card) 69'; Jeong (yellow card) 74'; J. Younghusband (yellow card) 79'	Stadium: Rizal Memorial Stadium

February 1, 2012 4	Loyola	4 – 3	Global	Manila
19:00 PST	Jeong 17'; J. Younghusband 42', 50'; M.A. Hartmann 44'; Gonzales (yellow card) 62'; Cutamora (yellow card) 82'	Report	Bahadoran 20'; Guirado 76' (yellow card) 70'; I. Elhabbib 78'	Stadium: Rizal Memorial Stadium

February 4, 2012 5	Loyola	2 – 0	Kaya	Manila
16:00 PST	J. Younghusband 12'; P. Younghusband 37'	Report	Semblat (yellow card) 82'	Stadium: Rizal Memorial Stadium

February 19, 2012 6	Loyola	14 – 0	Philippine Navy	Makati
18:00 PST	J. Younghusband 15', 23', 65'; P. Younghusband 19', 36', 39', 55', 71'; M.A. Hartmann 21', 47', 73'; Gonzales (yellow card) 41'; Yoshioka (yellow card) 59'; Cortina (yellow card) 63'; Morallo 80', 89'; Camara 84'	Report	Piñero (yellow card) 9'; Caminos (red card) 23'; Viliran (yellow card) 30'; Kalalang (red card) 58'	Stadium: University of Makati Stadium

March 25, 2012 7	Loyola	5 – 0	Manila Nomads	Makati
18:00 PST	Cortina 5'; Jeong (yellow card) 12'; Johnson 25' (o.g.); P. Younghusband 38'; Musters 53' (o.g.); Ozaeta (yellow card) 85'; M.A. Hartmann 90+1'	Report	Denison (yellow card) 40'	Stadium: University of Makati Stadium

March 31, 2012 8	Loyola	3 – 3	Philippine Air Force	Makati
16:00 PST	P. Younghusband 13', 82'; M.A. Hartmann 27' (yellow card) 60'; Ikegwuruka (yellow card) 39'; Cuaresma (yellow card) 46'; Cortina (yellow card) 66'; J. Younghusband (red card) 90+3'	Report	Araneta 23', 90+4' (yellow card) 28'; Ballo-Allo (yellow card) 26'; Bulaquiña (yellow card) 52'; Jaugan (yellow card) 82'; Bermejo 90+3'	Stadium: University of Makati Stadium

April 14, 2012 9	Pasargad	0 – 1	Loyola	Makati
14:00 PST	Pascual (yellow card) 33'; Ujam (yellow card) 47'; Vangrunderbeek (yellow card) 47'; Mahdavi (yellow card) 88'; Emaka (yellow card) 78' (red card) 82'	Report	Cutamora (yellow card) 27'; M.A. Hartmann (yellow card) 84' (goal) 90+4'; Cuaresma (yellow card) 89'	Stadium: University of Makati Stadium

April 21, 2012 10	Loyola	3 – 2	Green Archers United	Makati
16:00 PST	Jeong 23'; M.A. Hartmann 47'; P. Younghusband 82'	Report	Montelibano (yellow card) 33'; Pasilan 49', 65'; Olowoyeye (yellow card) 50'	Stadium: University of Makati Stadium

April 25, 2012 11	Loyola	3 – 4	Pasargad	Makati
19:00 PST	Cuaresma (yellow card) 6'; M.A. Hartmann (yellow card) 7'; Jeong 16', 74'; J. Younghusband 58'; Cortina (yellow card) 77'	Report	Ohadi 14'; Jafaridastjerdi 19', 45', 84'; Torres (yellow card) 47'; Golkhah (yellow card) 59'	Stadium: University of Makati Stadium

April 29, 2012 12	Loyola	4 – 0	Philippine Army	Makati
18:00 PST	P. Younghusband 41', 74', 77'; Cortina 60'	Report	Gempisaw (yellow card) 35'; Gener (yellow card) 76'; Becite (yellow card) 49' (yellow-red card) 90+1'	Stadium: University of Makati Stadium

May 5, 2012 13	Loyola	3 – 0	Stallion	Makati
16:00 PST	J. Younghusband 10', 78'; Cortina (yellow card) 25'; P. Younghusband 29'; Ikegwuruka (yellow card) 41'; Dorlas (yellow card) 64'; M.A. Hartmann (yellow card) 83'	Report	Albor (yellow card) 28'; Hugo (yellow card) 35'; Braga (yellow card) 65'; Simpron (yellow card) 90+1'; Munoz (yellow card) 28' (yellow-red card) 59'; Nam (yellow card) 73' (yellow-red card) 74'	Stadium: University of Makati Stadium

May 12, 2012 14	Kaya	2 – 2	Loyola	Makati
16:00 PST	Burkey 21'; Moy 61'	Report	Ikegwuruka (yellow card) 32'; P. Younghusband 47'; Morallo (yellow card) 49'; Cutamora (yellow card) 74'; Camara (yellow card) 84'; J. Younghusband 90+3'	Stadium: University of Makati Stadium

June 16, 2012 15	Philippine Navy	1 – 10	Loyola	Manila
16:00 PST	Leyble (yellow card) 15'; Cariño (yellow card) 25'; Cabural (yellow card) 44'; Burda (yellow card) 46'; Perez 86'	Report	P. Younghusband 27', 32', 41', 54', 62'; M.A. Hartmann 37', 79'; Cortina (yellow card) 46'; Park 68'; Camara 69'; Kim 84'; Cabaniero (yellow card) 85'	Stadium: Rizal Memorial Stadium

June 20, 2012 16	Philippine Air Force	2 – 1	Loyola	Manila
19:00 PST	Barsales 35'; Bayona (yellow card) 44'; Araneta (yellow card) 90+2'; Palmes 90+3'	Report	J. Younghusband (yellow card) 44'; Kim 48'	Stadium: Rizal Memorial Stadium

June 22, 2012 17	Manila Nomads	2 – 2	Loyola	Manila
20:00 PST	Denison 54'; Mensah (yellow card) 64'; Klok (yellow card) 86'; Borrill 90'	Report	M.A. Hartmann 48'; Jeong 70'	Stadium: Rizal Memorial Stadium

June 26, 2012 18	Loyola	1 – 1	Global	Manila
20:00 PST	Jeong 76'	Report	Kama (yellow card) 45'; Guirado (yellow card) 59'; I. Elhabbib 65'; B. Elhabbib (red card) 90+3'	Stadium: Rizal Memorial Stadium

=== UFL Cup ===
October 27, 2011 (Note: Originally scheduled at 15:00 on October 9 but was postponed due to the unplayable pitch from heavy rain.) Group stage	Loyola	5 – 1	Agila	Makati
20:00 PST	P. Younghusband 34', 66', 78'; Cortina 40'; Versario 70'	Report	Potenciano 60'	Stadium: University of Makati Stadium

October 15, 2011 Group stage	Team Socceroo	1 – 15	Loyola	Manila
14:00 PST	M. Reyes 55'	Report	M.A. Hartmann 6', 25', 27', 63', 90'; M.J. Hartmann 9'; P. Younghusband 23', 29', 31', 39', 44', 80', 83'; Morallo 42'; Cortina 72'	Stadium: Rizal Memorial Stadium

October 23, 2011 Group stage	Internacionale FC	0 – 7	Loyola	Makati
17:00 PST		Report	P. Younghusband 15', 18', 31', 50'; M.A. Hartmann 59', 61'; Borja 86'	Stadium: University of Makati Stadium

November 26, 2011 Round of 16	Loyola	14 – 0	Sunken Garden United	Parañaque
20:00 PST	M.A. Hartmann 19', 49', 70', 81'; Morallo 24'; P. Younghusband 31', 42', 56', 64', 78', 87'; J. Younghusband 74'; Cortina 88'; Elnar 89'	Report		Stadium: Nomads Sports Club

November 30, 2011 Quarter-finals	Loyola	2 – 1	Stallion	Makati
20:00 PST	P. Younghusband 22', 32'	Report	Han-Gi 78'	Stadium: University of Makati Stadium

December 5, 2011 Semi-finals	Loyola	5 – 4	Kaya	Manila
18:00 PST	P. Younghusband 57', 69' (pen.), 85'; M.A. Hartmann 73'; J. Younghusband 78'	Report	Boley 10'; Dagroh 32', 35'; Burkey 90+5'	Stadium: Rizal Memorial Stadium; Attendance: 3,000

December 10, 2011 Finals	Loyola	0 – 2	Philippine Air Force	Manila
16:00 PST		Report	Araneta 40'; Barsales 89'	Stadium: Rizal Memorial Stadium; Attendance: 6,000

=== Singapore Cup ===
May 18, 2012 Preliminary round	Loyola (Philippines)	2 – 1 (a.e.t.)	(Singapore) Geylang United	Singapore
19:45 SST	M.A. Hartmann 62'; Park Min-ho 95'	Report	King 43'	Stadium: Jalan Besar Stadium; Attendance: 1,044; Referee: Leow Thiam Hoe

July 5, 2012 1st Leg	Loyola (Philippines)	3 – 1	(Myanmar) Kanbawza	Singapore
19:45 SST	P. Younghusband 15'; M.A. Hartmann 66'; J. Younghusband 90+1'	Report	S.M. Oo 75'	Stadium: Jalan Besar Stadium; Attendance: 2,784; Referee: Leow Thiam Hoe

July 9, 2012 2nd Leg	Kanbawza (Myanmar)	2 – 2 (3 – 5 agg.)	(Philippines) Loyola	Singapore
19:45 SST	Hanson 61'; Khaing 90+1'	Report	J. Younghusband 24'; Morallo 38'	Stadium: Jalan Besar Stadium; Attendance: 3,933; Referee: Me n MA

October 4, 2012 1st Leg	Tampines Rovers (Singapore)	2 – 0	(Philippines) Loyola	Singapore
19:45 SST	Đurić 29'; Croissant (yellow card) 38' (yellow-red card) 90+4'; Latiff 50'; Taha (yellow card) 70'	Report	Woo-Chul (yellow card) 25' (yellow-red card) 58'; Jang Jo-won (yellow card) 41'; Jeong (yellow card) 59'	Stadium: Clementi Stadium; Attendance: 2,784; Referee: Sukhbir Singh

October 7, 2012 2nd Leg	Loyola (Philippines)	0 – 3 (0 – 5 agg.)	(Singapore) Tampines Rovers	Singapore
19:45 SST	Gould (yellow card) 69'; Fadrigalan (yellow card) 90+1'	Report	Gligorov (yellow card) 20'; Mustafić (yellow card) 69'; Hadee (yellow card) 69'; Đurić 78', 84'; Fahmie (yellow card) 90'; Sahib 90+5'	Stadium: Jalan Besar Stadium; Referee: Yazeen Buhari

October 28, 2012 Third-place Playoff	Gombak United (Singapore)	4 – 0	(Philippines) Loyola	Singapore
17:15 SST	Hussain 7'; Manzur 11'; Hasan 35'; Durand 43'; Aikhena (yellow card) 64'	Report	Cuaresma (yellow card) 33'; Jang Jo-won (yellow card) 39'	Stadium: Jalan Besar Stadium; Referee: Leow Thiam Hoe
