= 2017 FC Meralco Manila season =

Meralco Manila
2017 season
- Chairman: Manuel V. Pangilinan
- Head coach: Jose Ariston Caslib
- Stadium: Rizal Memorial Stadium
- PFL: 1st (Regular Season); 3rd (Final Series)
Home colours	Away colours	Third colours
- All statistics correct as of 15 December 2017.

The 2017 season is Meralco Manila's first season in the Philippines Football League, the top flight of Philippines football.

== Preseason and friendlies ==
Win Draw Loss

=== Stallion Invitational Cup ===
March 15, 2017 GS Group B	Loyola Meralco Sparks (Philippines)	4–2	(United States) Belmont-Deft Touch	Biñan
	Tacagni 30'; Kouame; Minniecon; P. Younghusband	Report	Nathan DaRosa; Tonaldo Appia	Stadium: Biñan Football Stadium

March 18, 2017 GS Group B	Kaya Makati (Philippines)	1–5	(Philippines) Loyola Meralco Sparks	Biñan
	?	Report	Connor Tacagni 40'; Samuel Kouame 57'; Ashley Flores 61'; Kone Yaya 76', 90+1'	Stadium: Biñan Football Stadium

March 22, 2017 Semifinal	Loyola Meralco Sparks (Philippines)	unknown	(Philippines) Global Cebu	Biñan
	?	Report	Connor Tacagni 40'; Samuel Kouame 57'; Ashley Flores 61'; Kone Yaya 76', 90+1'	Stadium: Biñan Football Stadium

March 24, 2017 Final	Stallion Laguna (Philippines)	2–0 (a.e.t.)	(Philippines) Loyola Meralco Sparks	Biñan
	Rio Tamiya 105'; Thomert Nana 120'	Report		Stadium: Biñan Football Stadium

== Competitions ==
=== Philippines Football League ===
Pos	Team	Pld	W	D	L	GF	GA	GD	Pts	Qualification or relegation
1	Meralco Manila	28	17	7	4	43	33	+10	58	Qualification for finals series
2	Ceres–Negros (C)	28	17	6	5	76	27	+49	57	Qualification for finals series
3	Kaya FC–Makati	28	14	5	9	52	35	+17	47	Qualification for finals series
4	Global Cebu	28	13	8	7	47	37	+10	47	Qualification for finals series
5	Stallion Laguna	28	9	8	11	39	49	−10	35	
6	JPV Marikina	28	9	6	13	42	48	−6	33	
7	Davao Aguilas	28	4	10	14	35	56	−21	22	
8	Ilocos United	28	1	6	21	24	73	−49	9	

Source: Philippines Football League
Rules for classification: 1) Points; 2) Goal Difference; 3) Goals Scored
(C) Champions

==== Regular season ====
6 May 2017 1	Stallion Laguna	1–5	Meralco Manila	Biñan
16:00 UTC+8				Stadium: Biñan Football Stadium

13 May 2017 2	Meralco Manila	2–1	Ilocos United	Manila
16:00 UTC+8				Stadium: Rizal Memorial Stadium

20 May 2017 3	JPV Marikina	0–1	Meralco Manila	Biñan^{a}
16:00 UTC+8				Stadium: Biñan Football Stadium

3 June 2017 4	Meralco Manila	2–0	Davao Aguilas	Manila
19:00 UTC+8				Stadium: Rizal Memorial Stadium

17 June 2017 5	Kaya FC–Makati	0–2	Meralco Manila	Makati
16:00 UTC+8				Stadium: University of Makati Stadium

21 June 2017 6	Davao Aguilas	2–2	Meralco Manila	Tagum
16:00 UTC+8				Stadium: Davao del Norte Sports Complex

24 June 2017 7	Meralco Manila	1–1	Stallion Laguna	Manila
16:00 UTC+8				Stadium: Rizal Memorial Stadium

1 July 2017 8	Ilocos United	0–1	Meralco Manila	Bantay^{b}
16:00 UTC+8				Stadium: Quirino Stadium

8 July 2017 9	Meralco Manila	1–0	JPV Marikina	Manila
19:00 UTC+8				Stadium: Rizal Memorial Stadium

15 July 2017 10	Meralco Manila	0–7	Ceres–Negros	Manila
16:00 UTC+8				Stadium: Rizal Memorial Stadium

22 July 2017 11	Meralco Manila	2–2	Global Cebu	Manila
16:00 UTC+8				Stadium: Rizal Memorial Stadium

29 July 2017 12	Davao Aguilas	2–3	Meralco Manila	Tagum
16:00 UTC+8				Stadium: Davao del Norte Sports Complex

2 August 2017 13	Meralco Manila	1–2	Global Cebu	Manila
16:00 UTC+8				Stadium: Rizal Memorial Stadium

5 August 2017 14	Meralco Manila	2–1	Kaya FC–Makati	Manila
19:00 UTC+8				Stadium: Rizal Memorial Stadium

12 August 2017 15	Stallion Laguna	2–3	Meralco Manila	Biñan
16:00 UTC+8				Stadium: Biñan Football Stadium

16 August 2017 16	Ceres–Negros	1–2	Meralco Manila	Bacolod
16:00 UTC+8				Stadium: Panaad Stadium

20 August 2017 17	Meralco Manila	1–0	Ilocos United	Manila
19:00 UTC+8				Stadium: Rizal Memorial Stadium

23 August 2017 18	JPV Marikina	1–1	Meralco Manila	Manila^{a}
16:00 UTC+8				Stadium: Rizal Memorial Stadium

16 September 2017 19	Global Cebu	0–0	Meralco Manila	Manila^{c}
16:00 UTC+8				Stadium: Rizal Memorial Stadium

23 September 2017 20	Meralco Manila	2–0	Davao Aguilas	Manila
19:00 UTC+8				Stadium: Rizal Memorial Stadium

30 September 2017 21	Kaya FC–Makati	2–1	Meralco Manila	Makati
16:00 UTC+8				Stadium: University of Makati Stadium

14 October 2017 22	Meralco Manila	0–0	Stallion Laguna	Manila
16:00 UTC+8				Stadium: Rizal Memorial Stadium

20 October 2017 23	Ilocos United	0–3	Meralco Manila	Bantay^{b}
19:00 UTC+8				Stadium: Quirino Stadium

28 October 2017 24	Meralco Manila	1–0	Kaya FC–Makati	Manila
16:00 UTC+8				Stadium: Rizal Memorial Stadium

31 October 2017 25	Meralco Manila	1–0	JPV Marikina	Manila
16:00 UTC+8				Stadium: Rizal Memorial Stadium

5 November 2017 26	Ceres–Negros	6–0	Meralco Manila	Bacolod
19:00 UTC+8	Marañón 22', 67' de Murga 28'; Rodriguez 30', 36', 54'			Stadium: Panaad Stadium

19 November 2017 27	Global Cebu	1–2	Meralco Manila	Manila^{c}
16:00 UTC+8				Stadium: Rizal Memorial Stadium

24 November 2017 28	Meralco Manila	0–0	Ceres–Negros	Manila
19:00 UTC+8				Stadium: Rizal Memorial Stadium

Note:

- a Because of the ongoing works in the Marikina Sports Complex, the team will play its first few league games at the Biñan Football Stadium and Rizal Memorial Stadium and will have to groundshare with Stallion Laguna and Meralco Manila, respectively.
- b The home stadium of the club is located in Bantay, Ilocos Sur, a nearby town of Vigan. For administrative and marketing purposes, the home city of Ilocos United is designated as "Vigan"
- c Because of the ongoing works in the University of San Carlos Stadium, the team will play its first few league games at the Rizal Memorial Stadium in Manila and will have to groundshare with Meralco Manila.

==== Final Series ====
3 December 2017 Semi Final Leg 1	Global Cebu	2–1	Meralco Manila	Manila^{1}
19:00 UTC+8	Wesley 90'; Minegishi 90+2'		Minniecon 61' (pen.)	Stadium: Rizal Memorial Stadium

^1 The game is considered as a Home Game for Global Cebu. Game will be played in RMS due to unavailability of Global's home stadium, the Cebu City Sports Complex.

9 December 2017 Semi Final Leg 2	Meralco Manila	1–1 (2–3 agg.)	Global Cebu	Manila
19:00 UTC+8	Dizon 2'		Sanchez 86'	Stadium: Rizal Memorial Stadium

16 December 2017 Battle for Third	Meralco Manila	3–1	Kaya FC–Makati	Manila
16:00 UTC+8	Cañas 4'; Dizon 16', 24'		Bedic 58'	Stadium: Rizal Memorial Stadium

== League squad ==
As of 3 September 2017

Squad No.	Name	Nationality	Position(s)	Date of birth (Age)	Previous club
Goalkeepers
1	Florencio Badelic Jr.	(Philippines)	GK	22 May 1994 (age 31)	(Philippines) Global Cebu
2	Nathanael Villanueva	(Philippines)	GK	25 October 1995 (age 29)	(Philippines) Pachanga Diliman
30	Ricardo Padilla Jr.	(Philippines)	GK	30 September 1987 (age 38)	
Defenders
3	Joaquín Cañas	(Spain)	CB	28 August 1987 (age 38)	(Philippines) Stallion Laguna
4	Alvin Sarmiento	(Philippines) (England)	RB	6 May 1993 (age 32)	(Philippines) Green Archers United
5	Edward Mallari	(Philippines) (United States)	LB	27 July 1983 (age 42)	(Philippines) Kaya
14	Lee Jeong-min	(South Korea)	CB	17 July 1990 (age 35)	(South Korea) Seongnam
15	Nathaneil Dorimon	(Philippines)	RB	3 January 1992 (age 33)	(Philippines) Mendiola
18	Julian Clarino	(Philippines)	CB	15 August 1995 (age 30)	(Philippines) Global Cebu
23	Tyler Matas	(Philippines) (United States)	LB	3 August 1994 (age 31)	(United States) Burlingame Dragons
25	Milan Nikolić	(Serbia)	CB	10 February 1988 (age 37)	(Philippines) Global Cebu
Midfielders
6	Andrés Gonzales	(Philippines)	CDM	1 May 1981 (age 44)	(Philippines) Pachanga Diliman
8	Simon Greatwich	(Philippines) (England)	CM	30 September 1988 (age 37)	(United States) Hartwick Hawks
12	Tahj Minniecon	(Australia) (Samoa)	RM	13 February 1989 (age 36)	(Australia) Rockdale City Suns
16	Daniel Gadia	(Philippines)	CM	5 July 1993 (age 32)	(Philippines) Pachanga Diliman
17	Christian Cruz-Herrera	(Philippines) (United States)	CM	2 April 1996 (age 29)	(United States) Ventura County Fusion
19	Curt Dizon	(Philippines) (England)	LM	4 February 1994 (age 31)	(Philippines) Global Cebu
21	Edienzel Velizano	(Philippines)	CAM	8 April 1994 (age 31)	(Philippines) De La Salle–College of Saint Benilde
24	Jean De los Reyes	(Philippines)	LM	19 April 1991 (age 34)	(Philippines) Pasargad
27	Jake Morallo	(Philippines)	LM	12 July 1988 (age 37)	(Philippines) Manila Jeepney
31	Franco De la Torre	(Philippines)	CM	20 November 1996 (age 28)	(Philippines) Davao Aguilas
Forwards
9	Gerardo Valmayor	(Philippines)	ST	8 June 1992 (age 33)	(Philippines) Pachanga Diliman
11	Jim Ashley Flores	(Philippines)	RW	12 September 1992 (age 33)	(Philippines) Stallion Laguna
13	Connor Tacagni	(Philippines) (England)	ST	27 September 1995 (age 30)	(Philippines) San Beda College
22	David Fornea	(Philippines)	ST	13 October 1991 (age 34)	(Philippines) Pachanga Diliman
