= Phil Greatwich =

Footballer (born 1987)

Personal information
- Full name: Philip Carlo Barbon Greatwich
- Date of birth: 21 January 1987 (age 39)
- Place of birth: Brighton, England
- Height: 5 ft 11 in (1.80 m)
- Position: Full-back

Team information
- Current team: Towson Tigers

Youth career
- –2003: Brighton & Hove Albion
- 200x–2005: Burgess Hill Town

College career
Years	Team	Apps	(Gls)
2007–2010	Towson Tigers	63	(0)

Senior career*
Years	Team	Apps	(Gls)
2005–2007	Burgess Hill Town		
2014–2015	Baltimore Bohemians	10	(0)

International career^{‡}
2006–2008	Philippines	9	(0)
- * Club domestic league appearances and goals as of 20:57, 28 January 2017 (UTC) ‡ National team caps and goals as of 20:57, 28 January 2017 (UTC)

Philip Carlo Barbon Greatwich (born 21 January 1987) is a former footballer who played as a full-back. Born in England, he played for the Philippines national team internationally.

== Club career ==
Greatwich was born in Brighton, and began his football career as a schoolboy with Brighton & Hove Albion. Released as a 16-year-old, he made his debut in first-team football for Burgess Hill Town of the Isthmian League Division One South, and won the club's Young Player of the Year award for the 2005–06 season.

In 2007, he went to the United States to begin a course in Sports Management at Towson University, Maryland, where he played for the Towson Tigers soccer team.

== International career ==
Greatwich qualified for the Philippines national team because his mother Carolina is Filipina. He received his first call-up to the Philippines national team in October 2006, and played in all three of the Philippines' group matches in the 2007 ASEAN Football Championship finals.

== Personal life ==
Greatwich's older brother Chris and younger brother Simon are also Philippines international footballers.
