= Yugo Kobayashi (footballer) =

Japanese footballer (born 1991)

Personal information
- Date of birth: October 20, 1991 (age 35)
- Place of birth: Japan
- Position: Striker

Senior career*
Years	Team	Apps	(Gls)
2011–13	Thespakusatsu		
2013–15	JP Voltes	11	(4)
2015–17	Songkhla United	29	(10)
2017–2018	Aizawl	11	(4)
2018	Sheik Jamal Dhanmondi	0	(0)
- * Club domestic league appearances and goals as of 27 November 2018

Yugo Kobayashi (born October 20, 1991) is a Japanese footballer plays as a striker.

== Career ==
=== Thespakutatsu ===
Yugo started his club career in 2011 with J2 League club Thespakusatsu. He played for Thespakusatsu three season before moving to Philippines.

=== Manila All–Japan (JP Voltes) ===
In 2014 Yugo signed for UFL Division–2 club Manila All–Japan (from 2015 onwards known as JP Voltes). Yugo scored 9 goals for Manila All–Japan in 2014 UFL FA League Cup and was joint second highest goal scorer of the tournament. Six of the nine goals came in a match against Dolphins United. Yugo scored 6 goals for Voltes in 2015 UFL Cup including 4 goal in a match against UST Growling Tigers to take his team to the knock–outs.

=== Songkhla United ===
In 2015 Yugo signed for Thai Division 1 League club Songkhla United. He had a good first season with the club scored 8 goals.

=== Aizawl ===
In August 2017, Yugo was signed by Aizawl F.C. for 2017–18 I-League season. He made his debut for Aizawl in the match against Mohun Bagan.

== Career statistics ==
As of 3 December 2017

Club	Season	League			FA Cup		League Cup		AFC		Total	
Club	Season	Division	Apps	Goals	Apps	Goals	Apps	Goals	Apps	Goals	Apps	Goals
Thespakusatsu	2011	2					–	–	–	–		
Thespakusatsu	2012	2					–	–	–	–		
Thespakusatsu	2013	2					–	–	–	–		
Manila All–Japan (JP Voltes)	2014	2					7	9	–	–	7	9
Manila All–Japan (JP Voltes)	2015	2	11	4	4	7			–	–	15	9
Songkhla United	2015	2	16	8					–	–	16	8
Songkhla United	2016	2	13	2	2	1	2	1	–	–	17	4
Aizawl	2017–18	1	1	0	–	–	–	–			1	0
Career total			41	14	6	8	9	10	0	0	56	32
