= Ultras Filipinas =

Organized sports fan group based in the Philippines

- Abbreviation: UF
- Founded: 2012
- Type: Supporters' group
- Team: Philippine national teams (primarily men's football)

Ultras Filipinas is an organized sports fan group based in the Philippines. The ultras are known for their support for the Philippines national football team and the Philippines women's national football team.

== History ==
The Ultras Filipinas was formed in 2011 in Panaad. The group was a result of a decision of fans of Philippine Air Force F.C. and Ultras Kaya of Kaya F.C. to form a support group for the national teams of the Philippines, not necessarily just for the football team. Actually, the first outing of Ultras Filipinas was not for the national football team but for the national rugby union team.

The group became known for their support of the Philippines national football team. The group decided to support the Philippines national basketball team at the 2017 SEABA Championship where the aim was to bring the "Ultras mentality" which they describe as an aggressive kind of support to the Philippine basketball fan culture.

== Chants and recruitment ==
Most of their chants were inspired from football chants used in Europe and South America but some are originally conceptualized by the group. As an effort to make their chants have a more pronounced Filipino characteristic, the Ultras Filipinas often infuses Original Pilipino Music into the tunes and lyrics of their chants.

Ultras Filipinas recruits members usually online through social media.
