= Simon McMenemy =

Scottish association football manager

- McMenemy in 2015

Personal information
- Full name: Simon Alexander McMenemy
- Date of birth: 6 December 1977 (age 48)
- Place of birth: Aberdeen, Scotland

Senior career*
Years	Team	Apps	(Gls)
- Worthing
- Haywards Heath
- Burgess Hill
- Kajaanin Haka
- University of South Alabama

Managerial career
- 2009–2010: Worthing (assistant)
- 2010: Philippines
- 2011: Đồng Tâm Long An
- 2011–2012: Mitra Kukar
- 2013: Pelita Bandung Raya
- 2014: New Radiant
- 2014–2016: Loyola Meralco Sparks
- 2017–2018: Bhayangkara
- 2019: Indonesia
- 2023: Visakha
- 2024–: Persela Lamongan (technical director)
- * Club domestic league appearances and goals

Simon Alexander McMenemy (born 6 December 1977) is a Scottish football manager and the current technical director of Liga 2 club Persela Lamongan. Previously, he had spells as manager of Bhayangkara, Maldivian side New Radiant, Indonesia Super League club Pelita Bandung Raya, Mitra Kukar in Indonesia, Đồng Tâm Long An in Vietnam, Loyola Meralco Sparks in Philippines, the Philippines national team and the Indonesia national team.

He rejoined Bhayangkara in 2021 as technical director.

His first job in football was for Brighton & Hove Albion as a development officer. McMenemy then worked for sportswear giant Nike. He was the assistant coach of English non-League football side Worthing before moving on to management. Previously, he applied for the Clyde vacancy in his native Scotland in 2014 but lost out to Barry Ferguson.

== Coaching career ==
=== Haywards Heath Town ===
McMenemy started his career in coaching as manager of Sussex County League club Haywards Heath Town.

=== Philippines ===
Through Chris Greatwich, one of his former players at club Lewes, McMenemy heard about the vacant coaching job in the Philippines. Five weeks after applying, he received an offer from the Philippine Football Federation, the governing body of football in the country, to coach the Philippines national team.

After an undefeated group campaign, one win and two draws, the Philippines qualified second in the group to face the Indonesia national team in the semi-finals. The team was eventually defeated 2–0 on aggregate with Indonesia's Cristian Gonzáles scoring a goal in each leg of the semi-final. Both the home and away legs were held in Indonesia as the Philippines didn't have a stadium that met the international standard set by AFF.

The win of the Philippines over the Vietnam national football team during the group phase of the 2010 AFF Suzuki Cup was ranked as one of the "Top 10 soccer stories of 2010" by columnist Georgina Turner of American sports magazine Sports Illustrated.

McMenemy left the Philippines in January 2011 and was replaced by German manager Michael Weiß.

=== Loyola Meralco Sparks ===
On 26 August 2014, McMenemy was named head coach of the Loyola Meralco Sparks of the United Football League, replacing Vince Santos, who led the team to the 2013 Cup title but was unable to win the more prestigious UFL league titles in the past two years.

On 31 January 2015, McMenemy won his first silverware as a professional coach and as a Sparks manager. In December 2016, Loyola announced that McMenemy had left the club.

=== Bhayangkara ===
Indonesian club Bhayangkara appointed McMenemy to lead the club as its head coach on 23 December 2016. Bhayangkara won the Indonesian Liga 1 on that moment.

=== Indonesia ===
On 20 December 2018, McMenemy was appointed by the Football Association of Indonesia as the head coach of the national team, replacing Bima Sakti. PSSI decided to sack McMenemy on 6 November 2019 over the national team's deteriorating performance during 2022 World Cup qualification, shortly after Indonesia was awarded hosting rights for the 2021 FIFA U-20 World Cup.

== Managerial statistics ==
As of match played 3 December 2023

Managerial record by team and tenure
Team	Nat	From	To	Record				
Team	Nat	From	To	G	W	D	L	Win %
Philippines	(Philippines)	28 August 2010	31 December 2010	10	3	5	2	30.00
Mitra Kukar	(Indonesia)	1 October 2011	23 March 2012	16	8	3	5	50.00
Pelita Jaya	(Indonesia)	7 November 2012	10 March 2013	10	2	3	5	20.00
New Radiant	(Maldives)	13 March 2014	10 May 2014	4	0	0	4	0.00
Loyola	(Philippines)	26 August 2014	31 December 2016	31	21	3	7	67.74
Bhayangkara	(Indonesia)	1 January 2017	31 December 2018	68	37	10	21	54.41
Indonesia	(Indonesia)	1 January 2019	14 November 2019	7	2	0	5	28.57
Visakha	(Cambodia)	31 December 2022	5 December 2023	13	7	2	4	53.85
Career Total				154	78	23	53	50.65

== Honours ==
Loyola Meralco Sparks

- United Football League Division 1: runners-up 2014
- PFF National Men's Club Championship: 2014–15

Bhayangkara

- Liga 1: 2017

Individual

- Liga 1 Best Coach: 2017
