= Tomas Trigo =

Filipino footballer

Personal information
- Full name: Tomas Angel Gonzalez Trigo
- Birth name: Tomás Ángel Trigo González
- Date of birth: June 8, 1989 (age 37)
- Place of birth: Pamplona, Spain
- Height: 1.88 m (6 ft 2 in)
- Position: Goalkeeper

Senior career*
Years	Team	Apps	(Gls)
2008–2014	Universidad de Navarra		
2014	Team Socceroo	15	(0)
2014–2016	Loyola Meralco Sparks	?	(0)

International career
2014	Philippines	1	(0)

Managerial career
- 2017–2019: Mulier FCN (goalkeeping)
- 2019–2020: Peña Sport (goalkeeping)
- 2020–: Osasuna Femenino (goalkeeping)
- * Club domestic league appearances and goals

Tomas Angel Gonzalez Trigo (born June 8, 1989), also known as Tommy Trigo, is a former footballer who played as a goalkeeper. Born in Spain, he has been a member of the Philippines national team.

== Club career ==
=== Loyola ===
Trigo made his debut with the club in a 4–0 win against Laos FC. Towards the end of July 2016, Trigo left Loyola Meralco Sparks and subsequently quit the sport to move back to Spain and pursue a career in teaching.

== International career ==
Trigo has a Filipino maternal grandfather making him eligible to play for the Philippines at the international level. Trigo made his first international debut on November 14, 2014, when he entered as a substitute in a friendly against Cambodia three minutes before second-half injury time, replacing Patrick Deyto. It was his only appearance for the Philippines national team.

== Coaching career ==
=== Mulier FCN ===
A year after retiring as a professional footballer, Trigo was appointed as goalkeeper coach of Mulier FCN's senior team.

=== Peña Sport ===
In 2019, Trigo was appointed as goalkeeper coach of Tercera División club Peña Sport.

=== Osasuna Feminino ===
A year later, Trigo was appointed as goalkeeper coach of CA Osasuna Femenino.

== Honours ==
=== Club ===
Loyola

- PFF National Men's Club Championship: 2014–15

=== Individual awards ===
- 2014–15 PFF National Men's Club Championship Golden Glove
