= Curt Dizon =

Filipino footballer

Personal information
- Full name: Curt-Jordan Perez Dizon
- Date of birth: 4 February 1994 (age 32)
- Place of birth: London, England
- Height: 5 ft 11 in (1.80 m)
- Positions: Winger; forward

Team information
- Current team: One Taguig
- Number: 19

Youth career
- Crystal Palace

Senior career*
| Years | Team | Apps | (Gls) |
| 2013 | Gimnástica Segoviana | 1 | (0) |
| 2014–2015 | Global | | |
| 2015–2017 | Meralco Manila (Note: Goals and appearances counted starting 2017 season of PFL.) | 28 | (7) |
| 2018 | Global Cebu | 6 | (0) |
| 2018–2019 | Ceres–Negros | 7 | (5) |
| 2019 | Chonburi | 2 | (0) |
| 2020 | Azkals Development Team | 0 | (0) |
| 2020–2021 | Ratchaburi Mitr Phol | 0 | (0) |
| 2021–2023 | United City | 9 | (2) |
| 2023 | Penang | 1 | (0) |
| 2023–2024 | Kaya F.C.–Iloilo | 0 | (0) |
| 2024 | United City | 3 | (1) |
| 2024–2025 | Loyola | 16 | (0) |
| 2025– | One Taguig | 11 | (1) |

International career^{‡}
| 2015–2018 | Philippines U23 | 4 | (0) |
| 2014– | Philippines | 19 | (1) |
- * Club domestic league appearances and goals as of 10:31, 11 March 2026 ‡ National team caps and goals as of 02:30; 10 September 2022

Curt-Jordan Perez Dizon (born 4 February 1994) is a professional footballer who plays as a winger or a forward for Philippines Football League club One Taguig. Born in England, he plays for the Philippines national team.

== Early life ==
Curt Dizon is the son of two Filipino parents, Cris Dizon and Joy Perez. He was born and raised in London.

== Club career ==
Before heading to the Philippines, his football career started off in a local team where he was spotted by Brunswick, which soon became his next club. After a long run at Brunswick, Dizon was scouted and signed for Crystal Palace F.C. and played for the Under-16s team.

Dizon then played for Gimnástica Segoviana CF in Spain when he was 19. After being called up to the national team in early 2014, Dizon signed for Global F.C. of the United Football League. The following year, Global and Loyola Meralco Sparks F.C. came to an agreement to transfer Dizon in exchange of Loyola's midfielder Matthew Hartmann. Loyola changed its name to F.C. Meralco Manila when it joined the Philippines Football League in 2017.

On 6 May 2017, Dizon became the first-ever scorer of the newly inaugurated Philippines Football League (PFL), converting Alvin Sarmiento's pass in the 9th minute against Stallion Laguna. He was left without a club after Meralco Manila was disbanded in January 2018.

In January 2018, Dizon's former club, Global, now known as Global Cebu F.C., signed him after Meralco Manila's disbandment. The signing was announced through the club's official social media pages.

He was released by Global and signed by Ceres–Negros F.C. in July 2018. The team went on to win the Philippines Football League that year.

In July 2019, Dizon joined Chonburi in the Thai League 1.

In February 2020, Philippines national team manager Dan Palami announced that Dizon would join the Azkals Development Team (ADT), a new team that was set to participate in the 2020 season of the Philippines Football League. However, when the season began in October, he was not in the squad.

In December 2020, Dizon and OJ Porteria were signed by Ratchaburi Mitr Phol in the Thai League 1.

On 22 December 2022, Dizon was announced that he will signed for Penang. On 10 May 2023, Dizon was announced he has reached an agreement with the club to terminate his current contract and leave Penang.

== International career ==
Dizon scored in his debut with the Philippines on 11 April 2014 in a 3–0 home win against Nepal.

On 20 March 2015, it was announced that Dizon was called up to the Philippines U-23 team for the 2016 AFC U-23 Championship qualification phase in Thailand.

=== International goals ===
Scores and results list the Philippines' goal tally first.

| # | Date | Venue | Opponent | Score | Result | Competition |
2014
| 1. | 11 April 2014 | Grand Hamad Stadium, Doha | Nepal | 1–0 | 3–0 | Friendly |

== Honours ==
Global

- United Football League Division I (1): 2014
