= Loyola F.C. =

Filipino football club

Loyola FC
- Full name: Loyola Football Club Victorias
- Nickname: The Greywolves
- Short name: LFC
- Founded: 2006; 20 years ago as Loyola Agila
- Head coach: Vacant
- League: Philippines Football League
- 2024–25: Philippines Football League, 8th of 10
Home colours	Away colours

Loyola Football Club Victorias (also known as LFC Victorias) is a Philippine professional football club. They last played in the Philippines Football League (PFL), the highest tier of football in the Philippines. The club has won one UFL Cup and one PFF National Men's Club Championship.

Founded as Loyola Agila Football Club in 2006, the club changed its name to Loyola Meralco Sparks in 2011 after it was acquired by Meralco and the MVP Sports Foundation, both owned by multimillionaire Manny V. Pangilinan. The club was a founding member of the United Football League (UFL)—the de facto top-level league of Philippine football back then. They played in the UFL throughout its existence from 2010 to 2016. In 2017, the club changed its name to Meralco Manila, upon joining the Philippines Football League (PFL), the official top flight of Philippine football. Rizal Memorial Stadium then became the club's home ground. In the 2017 PFL, the club finished at the top of the league table but ended up in third place after the playoffs. In January 2018, the club ceased its participation in the PFL due to the lack of investors. The club was then renamed Loyola Football Club, though only their youth teams and academy remained operational. The club announced its return for 2023 Copa Paulino Alcantara.

== History ==
=== Loyola Agila (2006–2011) ===
The club was founded in 2006 as Loyola Agila Football Club by former student footballers of Ateneo de Manila University. The team is named after St. Ignatius of Loyola, the university's patron saint, while Agila is Tagalog for "eagle" (the university's sports teams are called the Ateneo Blue Eagles).

=== 2008 season ===
Since its foundation, Loyola Agila has been actively participating in local semi-professional club tournaments; the most notable is the Lotto Titans Football Cup.

=== 2009 season ===
The tournament was later changed to the Republic Cup, expanding the tournament to seven clubs from the previous five. In their opening matches, Loyola Agila defeated Titans FC 2–0, while their match against Superfriends FC ended in a 0–0 draw. Loyola Agila ended the tournament with a 3–2–2 record, finishing 4th overall.

=== 2010 season ===
Loyola was one of the teams that joined the first season of the UFL which they finished in fourth place. The team was then sponsored by ATR Kim-Eng by the 2011 season, which they finished 5th place under their team captain Patrick Ozaeta.

Loyola finished as runners-up in the 2010 Rexona-Republic Cup after losing 4–1 to Caliraya FC in the final.

=== Loyola Meralco Sparks (2011–2016) ===
Straight from the 2011 National Club Championships, the brothers Phil and James Younghusband led the new signed players of the Sparks in early September 2011, along with brothers Darren, Matthew and Mark Hartmann. The team was eventually taken over by Meralco and the MVP Sports Foundation which is owned by Manuel V. Pangilinan.

The Loyola Sparks had a successful campaign in the 2011 UFL Cup, but eventually lost to the Philippine Air Force 2–0 in the finals.

=== 2012 season ===
The Sparks started their 2012 United Football League campaign on a high note, topping all clubs at the end of the first round of competition. However, the club ended its league run in third place after a 1-all draw against eventual league champions Global FC.

After securing first place in the first round, the club was invited to play in the 2012 Singapore Cup. In the preliminary round on 18 May 2012, they played Geylang United, where they won 2–1 in added extra time, advancing them to the two-legged quarter-finals. They faced Burmese club Kanbawza in early July wherein they defeated them 5–3 on aggregate after a 3–1 win and a 2–2 draw in both legs. They faced Tampines Rovers in a two-legged semi-finals and lost 5–0 on aggregate. They lost the third-place match 4–0 to Gombak United.

The club also participated in the 2012 UFL Cup between September 15 to December 17, 2012. The club topped Group C, with Pachanga coming in a close second, to advance to the semi-finals of the cup. However, the team was eventually defeated by Global ending their run.

=== 2013 season ===
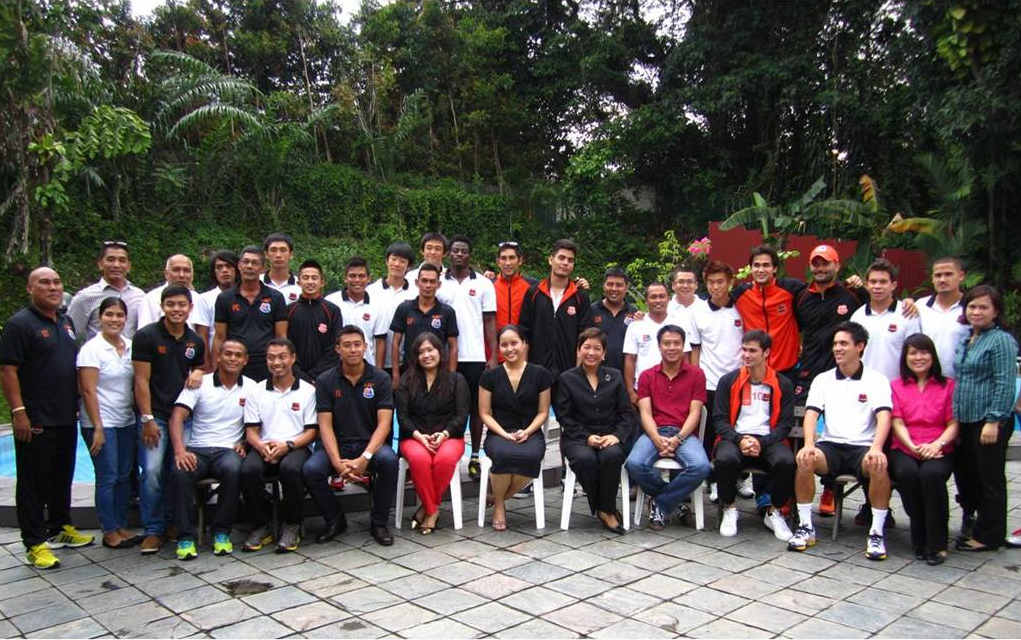
Members of the Loyola Meralco Sparks squad that competed at the 2013 Singapore Cup.

In the 2013 season, the club qualified for the 2013 PFF National Men's Club Championship alongside other UFL clubs. The club played against Flame United FC in the knock-out stage. However, they were eliminated by fellow Division 1 UFL side Kaya in the quarterfinals. They've played with Harimau Muda B in the 2013 Singapore Cup opening match which ended in favor of the club. However, they only reach the quarterfinal round when they bowed out to Tanjong Pagar United in a 5–4 aggregate.

After the elimination at the Singapore Cup, the team marked their fifth appearance at the 2013 UFL Cup. They started their campaign at the group stages by beating Dolphins United in double digits. They also faced Navy with a huge 9–0 victory.

On 30 October 2013, Loyola set a record with the most goals scored in the United Football League, they faced Blue Guards at the Emperador Stadium. Meralco defeated them by a margin of 33 points. It is regarded as the most lopsided win in the history of the United Football League (UFL) since it began a semi-professional league in 2009. Because of that Phil Younghusband currently leads the top scorer of the cup at 18 goals and the team advances to the knockout stages of the tournament.

=== 2014 season ===
During the 2014 season, Loyola hired former Philippines national team head coach Simon McMenemy as the club's new head coach, replacing Vincent Santos. The sparks ended their 2014 season as runners-up in the 2014 United Football League, finishing 13 points behind eventual champions Global and 3 points ahead Kaya.

=== 2015 season ===
In February 2015, Loyola won their first national title after beating Global 2–0 in the 2014–15 PFF National Men's Club Championship final.

The sparks ended their 2015 season as third placers in the 2015 United Football League, finishing 8 points behind eventual champions Ceres, lost to Global in goal difference and 4 points ahead Kaya.

=== 2016 season ===
The sparks ended their 2016 season once again as third placers in the 2016 United Football League, finishing 6 points behind eventual champions Global, lost to Ceres in goal difference.

=== Meralco Manila (2017–2018) ===
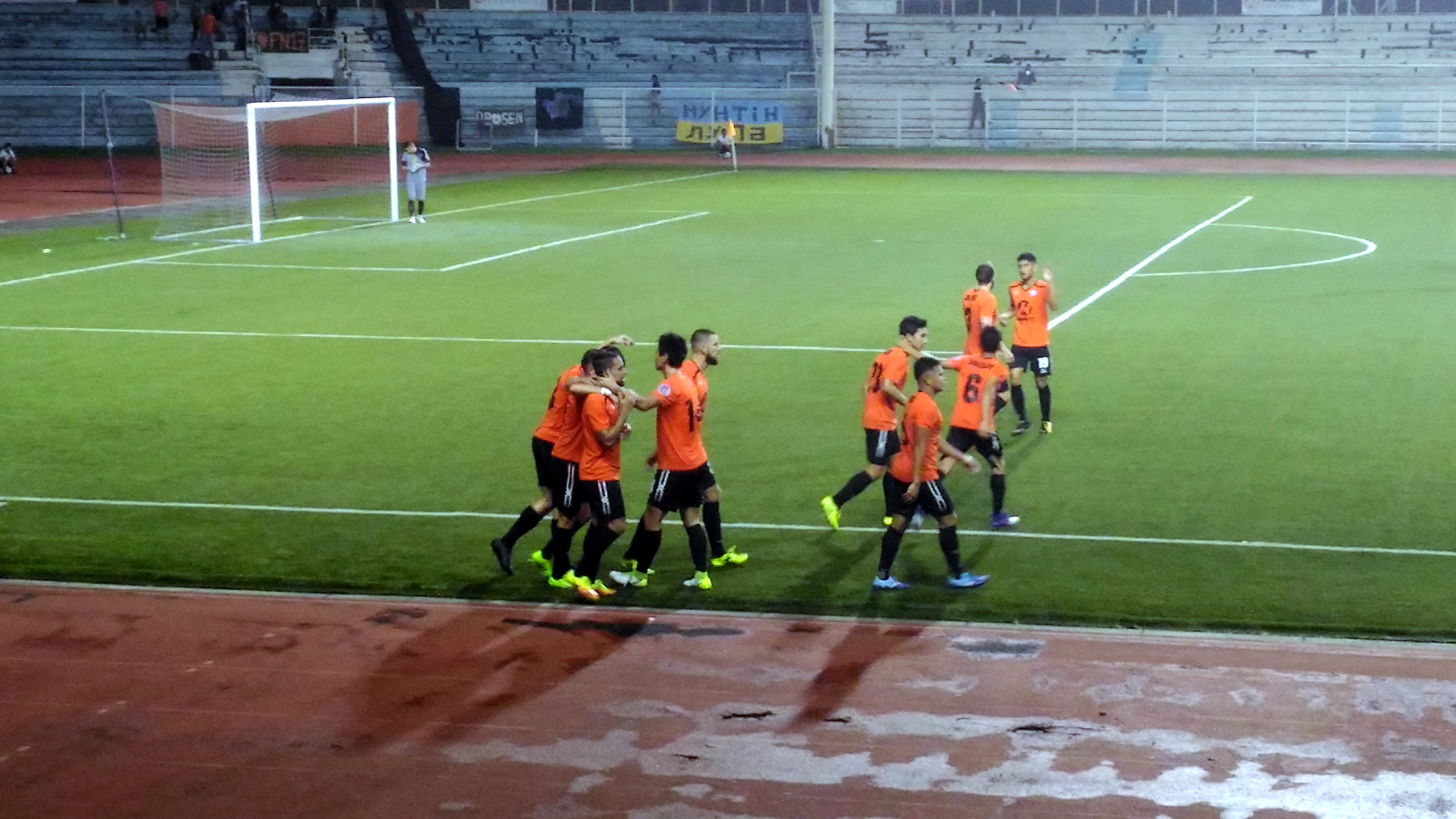
Meralco Manila players celebrating after scoring against Davao Aguilas. September 23, 2017.

After the announcement of the formation of the Philippines Football League, which was set to replace the United Football League as the country's top-tier football league, Loyola, along with 7 other UFL clubs, expressed their desire to enter the newly founded league. On the PFL's launching on April 21, 2017, it was confirmed that the team changed their name to Meralco Manila and assigned Manila as their home city. The team designated the Rizal Memorial Stadium as their home venue.

On January 8, 2018, the club announced that they have ceased their participation in the league. The management stated that they attempted to find investors to keep the club's league participation possible but were unable to do so.

=== Loyola (2018–2024) ===
In mid-January 2018, the club now called "Loyola Football Club" announced that their youth academy would continue operations. Their youth teams will continue their participation in the Youth Football League and they have entered a youth squad at the 7s Football League.

In February 2021, it was reported that the club is applying for a return to the Philippines Football League.

In 2022, Loyola sent their youth teams to participate in the La Liga Youth Tournament in Penang, Malaysia.

=== 2023 season ===
In June 2023, Loyola announced through social media that they will be participating in the 2023 Copa Paulino Alcantara. They were drawn in Group A together with former rivals Kaya–Iloilo and Philippine Air Force. Also with the group were Club De Fútbol Manila, Don Bosco Garelli and UAAP Season 85 champions Far Eastern University.

On 16 July 2023, Loyola lost their opening match against CF Manila, the score was 2–0. Six days later, Loyola faced FEU. Loyola were down two goals in the first half, but came back in the second half to settle for a draw. The match ended 2–2. Loyola then faced former UFL rivals Philippine Air Force and lost 3–0. Loyola ended their three-game winless run after defeating Don Bosco Garelli United 6–1. Loyola then lost to Kaya-Iloilo 7–0, ending their Copa Paulino Alcantara campaign with one win, one draw, and three losses.

=== Return to Philippines Football League ===
In early December 2023, after a five-season absence, Loyola announced their return to Philippines Football League through social media. During their comeback season, Loyola finished in 8th place, tallying five wins, a draw, and eight losses.

In September 2024, the club was initially recognized by the local government of Palawan to represent the province in the Philippines Football League for the 2024–25 season as Loyola Palawan. The PFL however continued to refer to the club as just Loyola FC, the partnership was later canceled.

=== Loyola Victorias ===
In February 2025, Loyola formalized its partnership with the local government of Victorias, Negros Occidental.

== Crest and colors ==
The club's crest is a variation of the Ateneo de Manila University seal, from which the club traces its roots. However, the seal's origin is the Shield of Oñaz-Loyola, a symbol of St. Ignatius family's Oñaz lineage.

The crest's colors are gold, maroon, and blue – representing nobility, strength, and loyalty respectively. The left side of the crest consists of seven maroon bars going diagonally from the upper left to the lower right on a gold field. The right side of the crest features a pair of rampant gray wolves flanking each side of a cooking pot. The "Loyola" name was a contraction of the words Lobo y Olla which literally meant "wolf and pot" in Spanish. The wolves are a symbol of nobility, and represents the players and fans of the club.

In 2017, the gray wolves was replaced by a sea-lion which is a representation of Manila.

Loyola crest history
As Loyola Agila (2006–2011)

As Loyola Meralco Sparks (2011–2017)

As Meralco Manila (2017–2018)

As Loyola (2018–)

== Kit manufacturers and shirt sponsors ==
Period	Kit manufacturer	Shirt partner
2010–2011	(Germany) Adidas	ATR-Kim Eng Securities
2011–2013	(Japan) Mizuno	Meralco^{1} Maybank, ATR-Kim Eng, Cebu Pacific, Jollibee^{2}
2013–2015	(Philippines) LGR Sportswear	Meralco^{1} Maybank, ATR-Kim Eng, Cebu Pacific, Jollibee^{2}
2015–2017	(United States) Under Armour	Meralco^{1} Maybank, ATR-Kim Eng, Cebu Pacific, Jollibee^{2}
2017	(Japan) Mizuno	Meralco^{1} Jollibee, Delimondo^{2}
2018–2024	(Philippines) RAD Apparel (Note: RAD Chameleon Apparel started providing kits for Loyola since 2018. Loyola had several kit sponsors in the past but won't be included in this article since they were not playing in a top-flight competition from 2018 to 2023.)	Unioil^{1} Popeyes, VV&Co^{2}
2024–	(Philippines) Chronos Athletics	Elan Vita^{1}

- ^{1}Major sponsor
- ^{2}Secondary sponsor

=== Kit evolution ===
Home kits

2013–14	2014–15	2017	2023	2024

Away kits

2013–14	2014–15	2017	2023	2024

Third kits

2013–14	2014–15	2017

== Support and rivalries ==
=== Early years ===
Loyola being a national team player-laden club, was known for having a fanbase mainly composed of fangirls who were avid supporters of the Philippine Azkals. During the 2011–2012 season, the SparkSquad, also known as the Sparklers, was the official supporters group of Loyola. Years later, a new supporter group was formed and named as Sparks Army Wolves.

=== Ultras ===
The club's first ultras group was established during the inaugural season of the Philippines Football League by Ultras Filipinas members, who were ardent Loyola supporters. The group was originally named as Ultras Loyola but was later changed to Frente Naranja (Spanish for Orange Front) with orange serving as the club's primary color after being taken over by Meralco and the MVP Sports Foundation. In 2018, after the cessation of the club's first team, Frente Naranja changed their name to Frente 17. The group continued supporting the youth teams of the club in their matches in Youth Football League and their de facto senior team in the 7's Football League second division.

=== Rivalries ===
Loyola had club rivalries with a number of teams in the United Football League/Philippines Football League.

=== Rivalry with Kaya ===
Since 2011, Loyola held a rivalry with National Capital Region neighbors Kaya, with Loyola being based in Quezon City and Kaya being based in Makati. The rivalry began in the 2011 UFL Cup semi-finals clash between the two teams, in which Kaya went up to lead the game by 3–0 only to lose by 4–5 after an enthralling comeback from the Sparks. Since then, the UFL has had some of its highest attendance numbers whenever there are match-ups between the two teams, making the rivalry the most famous derby in Philippine club football.

This rivalry continued into the first season of the newly founded Philippine Football League. However, after the first season of the PFL concluded, Meralco (Loyola) then decided to pull out of the league and Kaya moving to Iloilo City, effectively ending the rivalry between the two clubs.

=== Rivalry with Philippine Air Force ===
The rivalry with Philippine Air Force started when Air Force defeated the national team player-laden Loyola 2–0 during the 2011 UFL Cup final, Edmundo Mercado Jr., adjudged the best goalkeeper of the tournament, defiantly and somewhat controversially proclaimed his side as "true Filipinos".

The rivalry continued for years until Air Force rapidly declined and withdrew its participation in the UFL in 2015, this rivalry has mostly died out.

== Players ==
As of 28 February 2025

Note: Flags indicate national team as defined under FIFA eligibility rules; some limited exceptions apply. Players may hold more than one non-FIFA nationality.

No.	Pos.	Nation	Player
1	GK	JPN	Natsu Okamoto
3	DF	GUM	Leon Morimoto
4	DF	PHI	Marc Tobias
5	DF	MNG	Filip Chinzorig
6	MF	NED	Djumaney Burnet
7	FW	JPN	Kazuha Sudo
8	MF	POR	Anderson Pinto
10	FW	JPN	Koki Narita
11	MF	PHI	Paolo Gonzales
13	DF	PHI	John Clyde Vitualla
14	FW	PHI	Rico Andes
15	FW	PHI	Francis Tacardon

No.	Pos.	Nation	Player
17	FW	PHI	Ivan Ouano
18	DF	PHI	Eugene Arriola
19	FW	PHI	Curt Dizon (captain)
22	GK	PHI	Jessie Semblante
24	MF	PHI	Jemar Andrade
27	DF	PHI	Aaron Vasquez
34	DF	PHI	Dyango Echter
71	MF	PHI	Christian Peñalosa
77	MF	PHI	Tarshish Garciano
88	GK	PHI	Shane Salino
99	DF	PHI	Pete Forrosuelo

== Head coaches ==
Name	Period
(Philippines) Carlo Rodriguez	2010–2011
(South Korea) Kim Chul-soo	2011–2013
(Philippines) Vincent Santos	2013–2014
(Scotland) Simon McMenemy	2014–2016
(Philippines) Jose Ariston Caslib	2016–2018
(Philippines) Roxy Dorlas	2023–2024
(South Korea) Kim Chul-soo	2024
(Portugal) Paulo Jorge Silva	2025

== Honors ==
=== Domestic ===
- United Football League Division 1
  - Runners-up: 2014
- PFF National Men's Club Championship
  - Winners: 2014–15
- UFL Cup
  - Winners: 2013
  - Runners-up: 2011

=== Minor tournaments ===
- Rexona-Republic Cup
  - Runners-up: 2010
- Stallions FC Invitational Cup
  - Runners-up: 2017

== Records ==
=== Domestic tournament records ===
Season	Division	Teams	UFL/PFL	PFF NMCC/CPA	UFL Cup	FA Cup	League Cup
2009	—			—	Quarter-final	—	—
2010	1	8	4th	—	9th (Plate Champion)	—	—
2011	1	7	5th	—	2nd	—	—
2012	1	10	3rd	—	3rd	—	—
2013	1	10	3rd	Quarter-final	1st	—	—
2014	1	10	2nd	—	—	4th	3rd
2015	1	10	3rd	1st	3rd	—	—
2016	1	12	3rd	—	5th (Plate Champion)	—	—
2017	1	8	1st (Regular Season)	—	—	—	—
2017	1	8	3rd (Final Series)	—	—	—	—
2018	Did not participate			Did not participate	—	—	—
2019	Did not participate			Did not participate	—	—	—
2020	Did not participate			—	—	—	—
2021	Did not participate			Did not participate	—	—	—
2022–23	Did not participate			Did not participate	—	—	—
2023–24	1	15	8th	Group stage	—	—	—
2024–25	1	10	8th	—	—	—	—

=== International invitational tournament records ===
Season	Singapore Cup	Menpora Cup
2012	Fourth	—
2013	Quarter-final	Group stage
2014	Quarter-final	—

=== Results ===
Season	Competition	Round	Club	Home	Away	Aggregate
2012	Singapore Cup	Preliminary Round	(Singapore) Geylang United	2–1		
2012	Singapore Cup	Quarter-final	(Myanmar) Kanbawza	3–1	2–2	5–3
2012	Singapore Cup	Semi-final	(Singapore) Tampines Rovers	0–3	2–0	0–5
2012	Singapore Cup	Third-place playoff	(Singapore) Gombak United	0–3		Fourth
2013	Singapore Cup	Preliminary round	(Malaysia) Harimau Muda B	3–0		
2013	Singapore Cup	Quarter-final	(Singapore) Tanjong Pagar United	3–3	2–1	4–5
2013	Menpora Cup	Group B	(Indonesia) Persepam Madura United	1–3		4th
2013	Menpora Cup	Group B	(Indonesia) Arema	1–0		4th
2013	Menpora Cup	Group B	(Indonesia) Mitra Kukar	5–1		4th
2014	Singapore Cup	Preliminary round	(Laos) SHB Vientiane	7–1		
2014	Singapore Cup	Quarter-final	(Singapore) Home United	1–2	2–0	1–4
