= McKinley Hill Stadium =

Football stadium in Taguig, Philippines

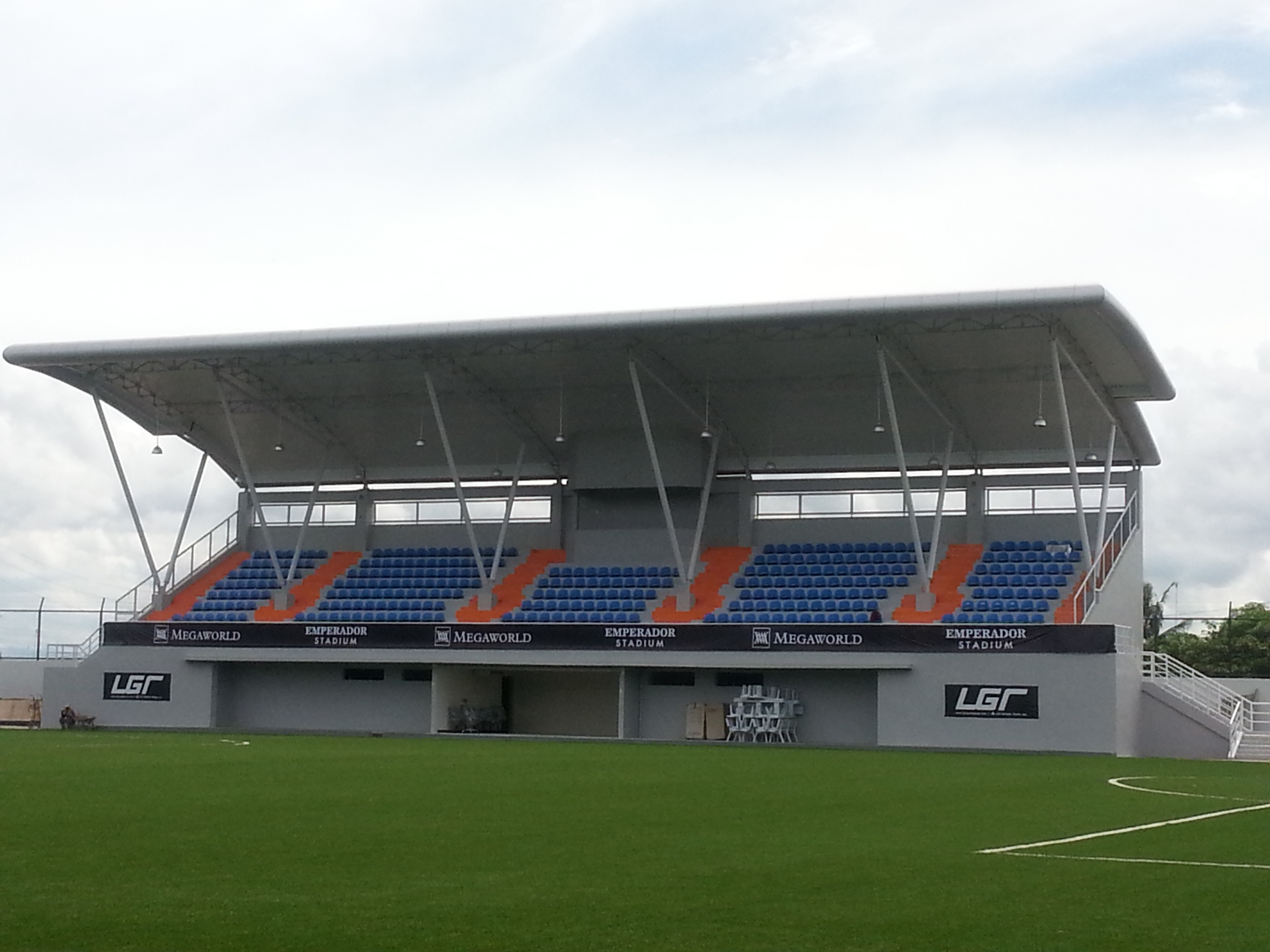
- The grandstand
- Interactive map of McKinley Hill Stadium
- Former names: Emperador Stadium (2013–2015)
- Location: McKinley Hill, Bonifacio Capital District, Pinagsama, Taguig, Philippines
- Coordinates: 14°31′52″N 121°03′13″E
- Owner: Megaworld Corporation
- Capacity: 2,000
- Surface: Artificial Turf
- Field size: 97 m × 60 m (318 ft × 197 ft)

Construction
- Opened: February 7, 2013

Tenants
- UAAP Football Championship (2016); Loyola Meralco Sparks (2016); Maharlika Taguig F.C. (2023–)

McKinley Hill Stadium is a 2,000-seater football stadium at McKinley Hill in Taguig, Metro Manila, Philippines.

== History ==
McKinley Hill Stadium was erected by real estate developer Megaworld Corporation and constructed by All Asia Structures, Inc. The contract to develop the stadium intended for business process outsourcing (BPO) company teams and high school and collegiate teams, was signed in January 2012.

The stadium was inaugurated on February 7, 2013 with the hosting of the United Football League (UFL) Division One match between Manila Nomads and Philippine Air Force.

The stadium would be known as the Emperador Stadium, after its sponsor Emperador Distillers Incorporated, a liquor making company and a sister company of Megaworld until around mid-2015.

== Facilities ==
McKinley Hill Stadium sits on a 15,000 m^{2} (160,000 sq ft) land in McKinley Hill, Barangay Pinagsama, Taguig. The stadium has an artificial pitch and a seating capacity of 2,000. The pitch measures 97 m × 60 m (318 ft × 197 ft), short of the FIFA recommended standard of 105 m × 68 m (344 ft × 223 ft).

== Tenants ==
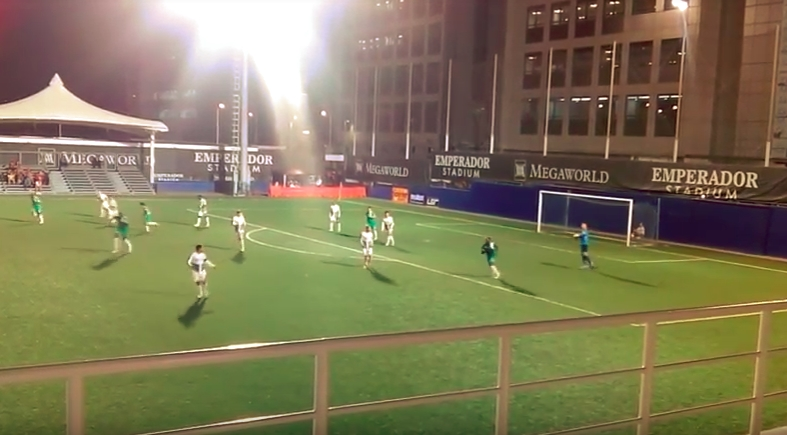
Green Archers United vs Pasargad UFL match, 2013

The McKinley Hill Stadium has been a venue of the now defunct United Football League (UFL). The UFL signed a deal with Megaworld in April 2012, prior to the completion of the stadium, which gave the league priority on the field usage of the venue for the next four years.

The Philippine Rugby Football Union signed a memorandum of agreement in 2015 with Megaworld stating that the venue will be used as the official training ground of the national rugby teams.

The venue has also hosted matches of the 7's Football League.
