= Simon Greatwich =

Filipino international footballer (born 1988)

Personal information
- Full name: Simon Clive Barbon Greatwich
- Date of birth: 30 September 1988 (age 38)
- Place of birth: Brighton, England
- Position: Centre midfielder

Team information
- Current team: Maharlika

Youth career
- 1998–xxxx: Brighton & Hove Albion

Senior career*
Years	Team	Apps	(Gls)
2006–2007	Burgess Hill Town		
2007–2009	Ringmer		
2009–2011	Hartwick Hawks	34	(2)
2012–2017	Meralco Manila	67	(7)
2020–	Maharlika Manila	0	(0)

International career^{‡}
2008–2014	Philippines	18	(1)
- * Club domestic league appearances and goals as of 09:23, 4 September 2020 (UTC) ‡ National team caps and goals as of 07:46, 25 November 2014 (UTC)

Simon Clive Barbon Greatwich (born 30 September 1988) is a footballer who plays for Maharlika Manila as a central midfielder. Born in England, he represented the Philippines internationally.

== Early and personal life ==
Born in Brighton on 30 September 1988, Greatwich is the younger brother of fellow players Christopher Greatwich and Phil Greatwich, and was born to an English father and a Filipina mother who is originally from Davao.

== Club career ==
After playing youth football with Brighton & Hove Albion, Greatwich spent his early senior career in English non-league football with Burgess Hill Town and Ringmer, before moving to the United States in 2009 to play college soccer with the Hartwick Hawks.

In early January 2012, Greatwich signed with Filipino side Loyola Meralco Sparks in time for the 2011-12 United Football League season.

He make his debut for the Sparks on 18 May 2012 against Geylang United FC for the 2012 Singapore Cup. His club was renamed as F.C. Meralco Manila when it joined the inaugural season of the Philippines Football League in 2017 which is the last time the club played in a league before its dissolution in January 2018. In 2020, during the COVID-19 pandemic, it was announced that he would play as a central midfielder for newly formed club Maharlika.

== International career ==
Greatwich made his international debut for the Philippines on 17 October 2008 in the 2008 AFF Suzuki Cup qualification tournament.

=== International goals ===
Scores and results list the Philippines' goal tally first.

#	Date	Venue	Opponent	Score	Result	Competition	Reference
1.	31 October 2014	Grand Hamad Stadium, Doha	Nepal	1–0	3–0	Friendly	

== Honours ==
=== Club ===
Loyola

- UFL Cup: 2013; Third 2012
