= Roxy Dorlas =

Filipino football manager and former player

Personal information
- Full name: Bongbong Roxy Vestidas Dorlas
- Date of birth: 2 September 1987 (age 39)
- Place of birth: The Hague, Netherlands
- Height: 1.75 m (5 ft 9 in)
- Position: Leftback

Team information
- Current team: Loyola F.C. (assistant)

Youth career
- 2007–2008: San Beda College

Senior career*
Years	Team	Apps	(Gls)
2008–2010	Mendiola		
2010–2015	Loyola Meralco Sparks		
2016	Global		

International career
2008–2010	Philippines	10	(0)
2010	Philippines (futsal)		

Managerial career
- 2017: Meralco Manila (assistant)
- 2017: Philippines U16
- 2018: Philippines U19 (assistant)
- 2019: Philippines U16
- 2020: Maharlika
- 2023–: Loyola
- * Club domestic league appearances and goals

Bongbong Roxy Vestidas Dorlas (born 2 September 1987) is a Filipino football coach and former player. He was the first coach of Philippines Football League (PFL) club Maharlika Manila.

== Personal life ==
Dorlas born and grew up in The Hague, Netherlands. Every two years he and his parents would go to the Philippines, the home country of his mother, for a vacation. At age 17, Dorlas and his family moved to the Philippines.

== Playing career ==
=== Collegiate ===
Dorlas was invited by the high school coach of the girls' football varsity team of San Beda College to join the school's men's varsity team after he was seen kicking a ball. Dorlas' sister was a player of the school's football team. Dorlas joined a training session with the men's varsity team and decided to study at San Beda and suit for the school's team.

He led San Beda in winning the football title at NCAA Season 86 in 2011.

=== Club ===
Dorlas played for Mendiola FC 1991. He joined the Loyola Meralco Sparks in 2011 and with the club won the 2013 UFL Cup and 2014–15 PFF National Men's Club Championship. He left Loyola in 2015 to join Global F.C.

=== International ===
Dorlas was part of the Philippines national football team from 2008 to 2010.

He was part of the Philippines squad that participated at the 2010 AFF Futsal Championship.

== Coaching career ==
=== Loyola ===
In 2015, Dorlas was coaching the under-15 team of Loyola. In January 2017, after a brief playing stint with Global FC, Dorlas returns to Loyola as part of head coach Aris Caslib's staff which marked the end of his playing career.

=== Philippines U16 ===
He became head coach of the Philippine boy's under-16 team and will mentor the team in the 2018 AFC U-16 Championship qualification in September 2017.

=== Philippines U19 ===
In 2018, Dorlas was appointed as assistant coach of the Philippines U19.

=== Philippines U16 ===
In 2019, Dorlas once again coached the Philippines under-16 team in the 2019 AFF U-16 Youth Championship.

=== Maharlika ===
On 24 August 2020 he was appointed as the first ever head coach of newly organized Maharlika Football Club.
