= Chris Greatwich =

English-born Filipino footballer (born 1983)

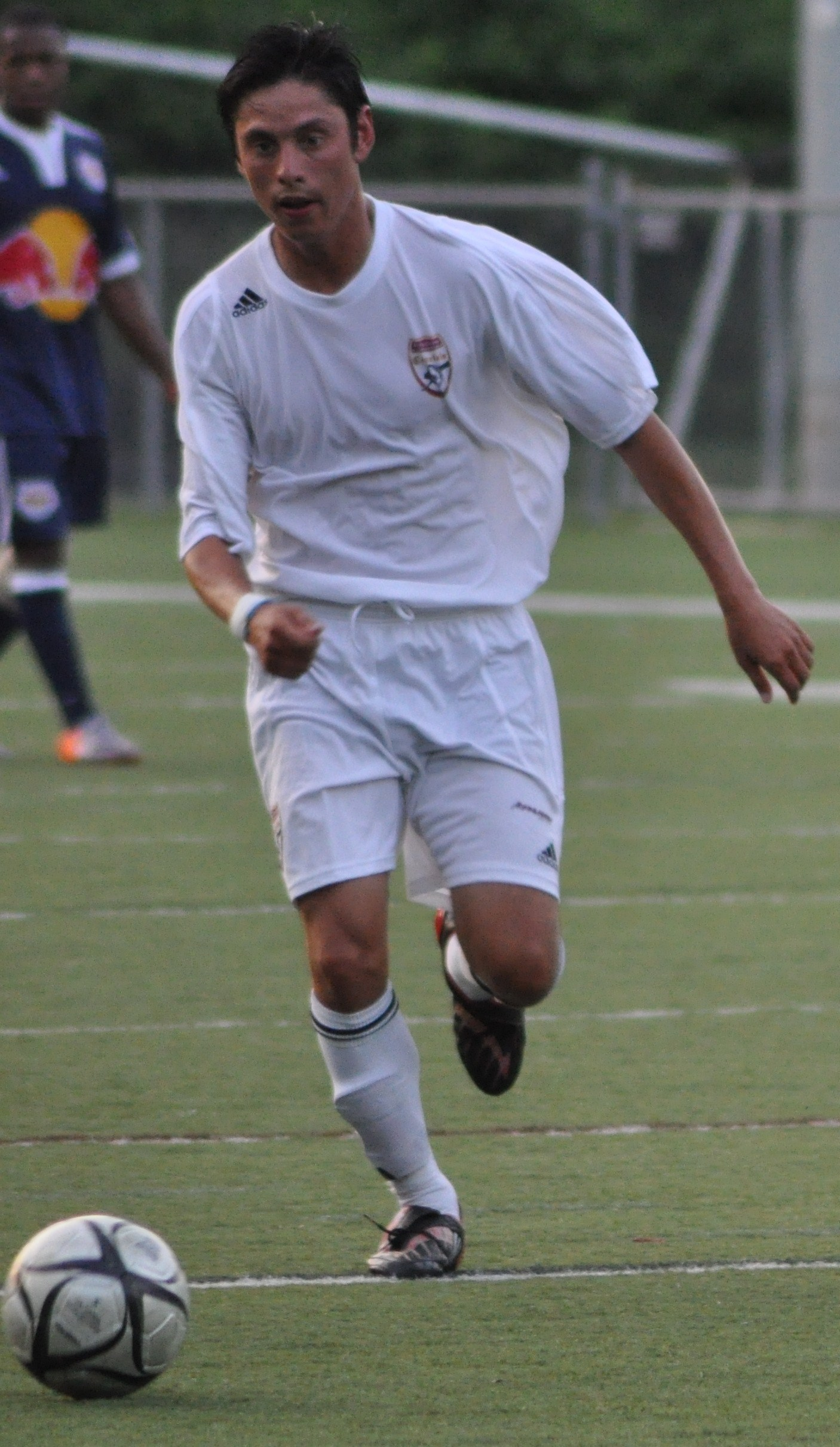
- Greatwich playing for the Colonials

Personal information
- Full name: Christopher Robert Barbon Greatwich
- Date of birth: 30 September 1983 (age 43)
- Place of birth: Westminster, England
- Height: 1.78 m (5 ft 10 in)
- Position: Midfielder

Youth career
- –2003: Brighton and Hove Albion

College career
Years	Team	Apps	(Gls)
2003–2004	Drury Panthers	50	(9)
2005–2006	Hartwick Hawks	40	(4)

Senior career*
Years	Team	Apps	(Gls)
2006–2007	Lewes	3	(1)
2007–2008	Bognor Regis Town	20	(0)
2010–2012	Morris County Colonials		
2013–2015	Kaya	32	(8)

International career
2004–2014	Philippines	48	(7)

Managerial career
- 2015: Kaya
- 2018–2020: Philippines (assistant)
Medal record
Men's football
Representing Philippines
AFC Challenge Cup
Silver medal – second place	2014 Maldives
- * Club domestic league appearances and goals

Christopher Robert Barbon Greatwich (born 30 September 1983) is a former professional footballer who played as a midfielder. Born in England, he played for the Philippines national team.

He was the assistant head coach of the Philippines from 2018 to 2020. He has previously played for Morris County Colonials and Kaya FC.

== Club career ==
Greatwich began his career at Brighton and Hove Albion when he was recommended to the club by his PE Teacher aged 12. He progressed through the youth ranks and was part of their successful FA Youth Cup side in 2002, which lost to eventual winners Aston Villa.

Following his release from the club in 2003, Greatwich pursued a soccer scholarship in the United States, playing for Drury University and Hartwick College. Upon graduation, Greatwich returned to UK and following an unsuccessful trial with Kilmarnock in the Scottish Premier League, he joined non-league clubs Lewes FC & Bognor Regis Town.

In January 2013, Greatwich joined Kaya F.C. in the Philippines United Football League. Alongside being a player, Greatwich was brought in to oversee the club's Academy system.

In November 2015, Greatwich was appointed as full-time head coach of the club. after Greatwich led the team to the UFL Cup as interim player-manager.

== International career ==
Greatwich began his international career with the Philippines in 2004, making his debut against Myanmar in the Tiger Cup. He was unable to play in 2005 in the SEA Games due to his Hartwick Hawks making the NCAA Tournament in the United States, but played the following year in Bacolod when they hosted the qualifiers for the Asean Championships. It was here that Greatwich scored his first international goal against Laos in the side's 1–2 defeat. He then scored in the 7–0 win over East Timor and played in wins against Cambodia and Brunei to see them qualify for the finals in Thailand. There they lost to Malaysia and Thailand before drawing with Myanmar in their final game.

In 2008 in Iloilo, Greatwich played in the AFC Challenge Cup games against Brunei, Tajikistan, and Bhutan. The team would eventually be eliminated on goal difference despite not conceding a goal or losing a match. Later that year, Greatwich played in the 2008 AFF Suzuki Cup qualifiers in Cambodia where the side again would be eliminated from the tournament this time on the basis of goals scored. Despite wins against East Timor (1–0) and Cambodia (3–2, with Greatwich scoring the second) the draw against Brunei (1–1) and loss to Laos (1–2) saw Laos and Cambodia qualify for the finals.

The 2009 AFC Challenge Cup qualifiers saw Greatwich play in all three games against Bhutan (1–0), host nation Maldives (2–3) and Turkmenistan (0–5) which saw them finish third in the group, behind Maldives and winners Turkmenistan, the latter advancing to the finals.

Greatwich was then a last-minute addition to the 2010 AFF Suzuki Cup in Vietnam despite not featuring in the qualifiers in Laos. In their first group game against Singapore, Greatwich scored an injury time equaliser to produce one of the biggest shocks in AFF Suzuki Cup history. Greatwich and the team went one better in the following game against defending champions Vietnam, when Greatwich scored a goal and an assist on Phil Younghusband's goal to win 2–0. Following a 0–0 draw in the final group game against Myanmar, the Philippines were matched up against Indonesia in the semi-finals. Both games were played in Jakarta following the ASEAN Football Federation's decision that the Philippines had no suitable venue to host the semi-finals, and lost both games 1–0. Greatwich suffered the misfortune of being sent-off in the final moments of the second leg.

In 2013, Greatwich scored the game-winning goal versus Pakistan to win the Peace Cup.

The AFC Challenge Cup, 2014 saw the Azkals progress out of the group stage, where they faced hosts Maldives in the semi-finals. Greatwich again would come up with the crucial goal, scoring the winning goal in extra-time in a 3–2 victory. The Azkals subsequently lost the final 1–0 to Palestine, scuppering their hopes of qualifying for the Asian Cup.

In March 2015 Greatwich announced that he was taking a break from the national team, specifically to spend more time with his family and his newborn son.

== International goals ==
No.	Date	Venue	Opponent	Score	Result	Competition
1.	12 November 2006	Panaad Stadium, Bacolod, Philippines	Laos	1–2	1–2	2007 AFF Championship qualification
2.	14 November 2006	Panaad Stadium, Bacolod, Philippines	Timor-Leste	3–0	7–0	2007 AFF Championship qualification
3.	23 October 2008	National Olympic Stadium, Phnom Penh, Cambodia	Cambodia	2–1	3–2	2008 AFF Championship qualification
4.	2 December 2010	Mỹ Đình National Stadium, Hanoi, Vietnam	Singapore	1–1	1–1	2010 AFF Championship
5.	5 December 2010	Mỹ Đình National Stadium, Hanoi, Vietnam	Vietnam	1–0	2–0	2010 AFF Championship
6.	15 October 2013	Panaad Stadium, Bacolod, Philippines	Pakistan	2–1	3–1	2013 Philippine Peace Cup
7.	27 May 2014	National Football Stadium, Malé, Maldives	Maldives	3–2	3–2 (a.e.t.)	2014 AFC Challenge Cup

== Managerial career ==
=== Kaya FC ===
On 2 November 2015 Kaya announced that they have assigned Chris Greatwich as the club's full-time head coach. Greatwich had previously served as the club's head coach in an interim capacity in numerous occasions such as in the 2015 UFL Cup knockout stage.

Following his appointment, Kaya qualified for the AFC Cup in 2016, progressing out of the group having only conceded 2 goals in 6 group games (fewest in the competition). At the time, it was the first time a Philippine club had qualified for the knock-out stages of the AFC Cup. Also led the team to a UFL Cup semi-final in 2016.

In the newly formed Philippine Football League (PFL) in 2017, Greatwich led the team to a third-place regular season finish, the club's highest league position in 5 years, and narrowly lost in the play-off semi-finals to eventual PFL Champions Ceres.

In 2018, the club won its second trophy in three years when Kaya won their domestic cup competition, the Paulino Alcantara trophy. In addition to this trophy, Greatwich steered the club to runner-up in the PFL League.

In 2016 Greatwich was named number 12 in FourFourTwo's "Top 15 Managers" in the ASEAN/ Australian region.

=== Philippine National Team ===
In March 2018, Head Coach Thomas Dooley appointed Greatwich as his Assistant Coach. The team had impending qualification games for the Asian Cup, which they ultimately qualified for via victory versus Tajikistan.

Following Dooley's departure, Greatwich remained as Assistant Coach under former England manager Sven-Göran Eriksson for the Suzuki Cup, where they led the team to the semi-finals, losing to eventual champion Vietnam. In January 2019, Eriksson and Greatwich worked together in the Philippines' first ever major tournament, the Asian Cup.

== Personal life ==
Greatwich's brothers Phil and Simon also play for the Philippine national football team.

== Honours ==
=== International ===
Philippines

- AFC Challenge Cup runner-up: 2014
