= Matthew Hartmann =

Filipino footballer (born 1989)

Personal information
- Full name: Matthew James Calibjo Hartmann
- Date of birth: 19 August 1989 (age 37)
- Place of birth: Southampton, England
- Height: 1.78 m (5 ft 10 in)
- Position: Midfielder

Youth career
- 2004–2006: Portsmouth

Senior career*
Years	Team	Apps	(Gls)
2006–2007	Portsmouth	0	(0)
2007	→ Weymouth (loan)	13	(1)
2008	Nottingham Forest	3	(0)
2009–2010	Bognor Regis Town	36	(5)
2011–2014	Loyola Meralco Sparks	65	(16)
2015–2017	Global	39	(10)
2017–2018	Davao Aguilas	43	(2)
2019–20??	Gosport Borough		

International career^{‡}
2007	Philippines U-21	2	(0)
2011	Philippines U-23	2	(0)
2006–2011	Philippines	6	(1)
- * Club domestic league appearances and goals as of 23:00, June 11, 2013 (UTC) ‡ National team caps and goals as of 11:00, September 3, 2014 (UTC)

Matthew James Calibjo Hartmann (born 19 August 1989), also known as Matt Hartmann, is a former professional footballer who played as a central midfielder. Born in England, he represented the Philippines at international level.

== Career ==
=== Club career ===
Hartmann went through the ranks at Portsmouth until he was released at the end of the 2006–07 season. In his final year with Portsmouth, he went out on loan to Weymouth eventually making a total of four appearances for the club.

In July 2007, Nottingham Forest signed Hartmann on a free transfer joining as a third year academy member. By July 2008 he was released and signed for Bognor Regis Town on a free transfer and made five appearances for the club.

In early September 2011, Hartmann signed for Filipino side Loyola Agila, thus joining his two brothers who already play for the club.

On 24 April 2015, Global announced that Hartmann has signed with them and will join his brother Mark Hartmann who was already with the club.

On 1 March 2019, Hartmann signed for English non-League football club Gosport Borough.

=== International career ===
Hartmann received his first senior call-up in November 2006 for the 2007 ASEAN Football Championship qualification tournament in Bacolod. He made his debut in the opening match as the Philippines lost 2–1. It would be his only appearance in the tournament. Early the following year, he got a call-up to play for the Philippine U-21's in the Hassanal Bolkiah Trophy. He made two appearances, against Myanmar and Brunei.

In September 2011, he was back in the national team setup and was named in the final 20-man squad for the 2011 Long Teng Cup and the provisional Philippines under-23 squad for the 2011 Southeast Games. In the Long Teng Cup, he made his first senior appearance since his debut in November 2006, playing the full 90 minutes in the 3–3 draw against Hong Kong in the opening match.

He was selected as a captain of the national under-23 team in time for the 2011 Southeast Asian Games.

== Personal life ==
He is the younger brother of Darren Hartmann, who has played for the Philippine U-21's during the 2005 Hassanal Bolkiah Trophy and the older brother of Mark Hartmann, who is also a Philippines under-23 and senior international footballer.

== Honours ==
- PFF National Men's Club Championship: - 2014- 2015 Best midfielder.
- PFF National Men's Club Championship: - 2014- 2015 Most valuable player
- United Football League: - 2016 Best midfielder
