= James Younghusband =

Filipino footballer (born 1986)

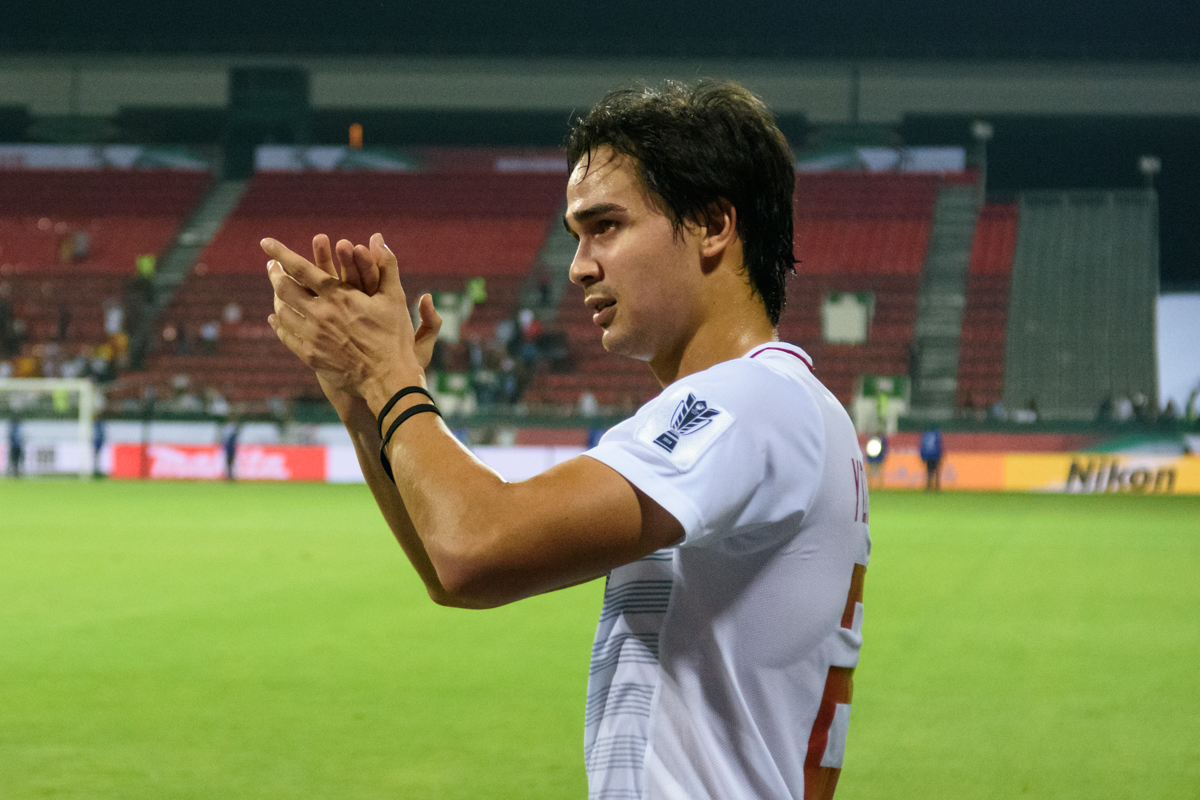
- Younghusband with the Philippines at the 2019 AFC Asian Cup

Personal information
- Full name: James Joseph Younghusband (Note: James Younghusband was born in England. Thus, he does not possess his mother's maiden name.)
- Date of birth: 4 September 1986 (age 40)
- Place of birth: Ashford, Surrey, England
- Positions: Right midfielder; striker

Youth career
- 1997–2003: Chelsea

Senior career*
Years	Team	Apps	(Gls)
2005	AFC Wimbledon	2	(0)
2006–2007	Staines Town	16	(2)
2008–2009	Woking	20	(5)
2010	Farnborough	18	(3)
2011	San Beda FC	21	(7)
2012–2017	Meralco Sparks / Manila	43	(25)
2017–2018	Davao Aguilas	53	(20)
2019–2020	Ceres–Negros	7	(2)
Total		180	(64)

International career
2005	Philippines U23	3	(1)
2006–2019	Philippines	98	(12)
Medal record
Men's football
Representing Philippines
AFC Challenge Cup
Silver medal – second place	2014 Maldives
Bronze medal – third place	2012 Nepal
- * Club domestic league appearances and goals

James Joseph Younghusband (born 4 September 1986) is a former professional footballer who played mostly as a right midfielder and sometimes as a forward.

Born in Surrey, England to an English father and Filipino mother, Younghusband played for the youth team of Chelsea. He spent his early senior career in the lower levels of English football with AFC Wimbledon, Staines Town, Woking, and Farnborough. He moved to the Philippines in 2011 where he played for San Beda, Loyola Meralco Sparks (later Meralco Manila), Davao Aguilas, and Ceres–Negros.

Younghusband played for the Philippines national team from 2005 to 2020, representing them in the Southeast Asian Games, AFF Championship, and AFC Asian Cup. He scored 12 goals for the senior national team.

Younghusband's younger brother, Phil, was also a footballer. The brothers have been teammates for both club and country.

== Club career ==
=== San Beda ===
On 15 April 2011, it was reported that Younghusband and his younger brother Phil announced that they will join San Beda for the 2011 National Club Championships under former national coach Aris Caslib. In the final, San Beda lost 3–0 to Teknika in the first leg. In the second leg, Younghusband scored from a free kick to make the score 2–0 to San Beda. San Beda, however, were not able to find a third a goal and Teknika won 3–2 on aggregate.

=== Meralco Manila ===
After the conclusion of the 2011 National Club Championship, he and his younger brother would be joining Loyola Agila on three-year deals.

In a round of 16 match in the 2011–12 United Football Cup match, Younghusband scored his first goal for Loyola in a 14–0 win over Sunken Garden United. He scored his second goal in the semi-finals in a 5–4 victory over Kaya after being 3–0 down at half-time. Loyola lost the final 2–0 to Philippine Air Force.

Younghusband scored his first league goal for Loyola in a 2–1 victory over Philippine Army. He then scored a brace in a 4–3 win against Global before adding another against Kaya. He then scored a hat-trick in a 14–0 thrashing of Philippine Navy. Leading 3–1, Younghusband received his first red card in the United Football League after a row with Air Force player Herbert Bayona after which Younghusband shoved Bayona. The sending off inspired Air Force to score twice in one minute to draw the match 3–3.

When Loyola Meralco joined the Philippines Football League (PFL) in 2017, it renamed itself as Meral Manila and Younghusband remained with the club.

=== Davao Aguilas ===
James Younghusband along with his brother was officially signed in by Davao Aguilas of the PFL in August 2017. The Younghusbands played for the club for two seasons until its dissolution by the end of the 2018 season.

=== Ceres Negros ===
After months of being without a club, James Younghusband was signed in by Ceres Negros of the PFL in August 2019.

Younghusband announced his retirement on 25 June 2020. He initially planned to play for Ceres for at least the whole 2020 season but decided to retire earlier due to the league being postponed due to the COVID-19 pandemic.

== International career ==
Early in 2005, the Philippine Football Federation was alerted by an anonymous video gamer regarding the eligibility of James and Phil Younghusband's to play for the Philippine national team, allegedly by finding out about their lineage via the Football Manager series. He and Phil, his younger brother, were eventually called up to the Southeast Asian nation's football squad, amidst much fanfare. Younghusband participated in the 2005 Southeast Asian Games, which was held in the Philippines. He also ensured the advancement of the Philippine team to the group stage of the 2012 AFC Challenge Cup qualification by scoring in the fourth minute of the away match against Mongolia in the qualifying play-off.

Younghusband was a mainstay of the Philippine national team in the 2010s, with his last stint being the 2019 AFC Asian Cup.

=== International goals ===
Scores and results list the Philippines' goal tally first

Goal	Date	Venue	Opponent	Score	Result	Competition
2007
1.	7 January	Choa Chu Kang Stadium, Choa Chu Kang	Singapore	1–1	1–4	Friendly
2010
2.	12 October	Kaohsiung National Stadium, Kaohsiung	Macau	3–0	5–0	2010 Long Teng Cup
3.	24 October	New Laos National Stadium, Vientiane	Laos	2–2	2–2	2010 AFF Suzuki Cup qualification
2011
4.	15 March	MFF Football Centre, Ulaanbaatar	Mongolia	1–0	1–2	2012 AFC Challenge Cup qualification
5.	21 March	Youth Training Centre, Yangon	Myanmar	1–0	1–1	2012 AFC Challenge Cup qualification
6.	11 October	Rizal Memorial Stadium, Manila	Nepal	2–0	4–0	Friendly
2012
7.	5 June	Rizal Memorial Stadium, Manila	Indonesia	1–1	2–2	Friendly
2013
8.	4 June	Mong Kok Stadium, Hong Kong	Hong Kong	1–0	1–0	Friendly
9.	11 October	Panaad Stadium, Bacolod	Chinese Taipei	1–1	1–2	2013 Philippine Peace Cup
2014
10.	3 September	Rizal Memorial Stadium, Manila	Chinese Taipei	2–0	5–1	2014 Philippine Peace Cup
2017
11.	5 September	Panaad Stadium, Bacolod	Yemen	2–2	2–2	2019 AFC Asian Cup qualification
2018
12.	6 December	Mỹ Đình National Stadium, Hanoi	Vietnam	1–2	1–2	2018 AFF Championship

== Personal life ==
Younghusband was born in Ashford, Surrey, England to a British father and a Filipina mother (both deceased). He is the brother of Philippine team forward Phil Younghusband.

After his retirement from football, Younghusband plans to return to England with his sister Keri.
