= 2018 JPV Marikina F.C. season =

JPV Marikina
2018 season
- Head coach: Dan Padernal
- Stadium: Marikina Sports Complex
- PFL: 5th
- Copa Paulino Alcantara: Group Stage (TBA)
- Top goalscorer: League: Keigu Moriyasu (2); All: Keigu Moriyasu (2)
Home colours	Away colours
- All statistics correct as of 9 August 2018.

The 2018 season is JPV Marikina's 2nd season in the top flight of Philippines football.

== Pre-season and friendlies ==
Win Draw Loss

=== Friendlies ===
1 February 2018	Global Cebu	0–1	JPV Marikina	Taguig
		Report	Poderoso	Stadium: McKinley Hill Stadium

2 February 2018	Stallion Laguna	2–3	JPV Marikina	Makati
	2x'	Report	Kozawa; Suzuki	Stadium: Gatorade-Chelsea Bluepitch

7 February 2018	Davao Aguilas	3–3	JPV Marikina	Manila
15:00 (UTC+8)	Sawyer 75', 77'; Gasic 57' (o.g.)	Report	Flores 46'; Franksson 73'; Altiche 79'	Stadium: Rizal Memorial Stadium

14 February 2018	Stallion Laguna	2–1	JPV Marikina	Biñan
9:00 (UTC+8)		Report		Stadium: Biñan Football Stadium

== Competitions ==
=== Overview ===
Competition	First match	Last match	Starting round	Final position	Record							
Competition	First match	Last match	Starting round	Final position	Pld	W	D	L	GF	GA	GD	Win %
Philippines Football League	3 March 2018	22 August 2018	Matchday 1	5th	25	7	3	15	46	57	−11	28.00
Copa Paulino Alcantara	15 September 2018	TBC	Group stage	TBC	0	0	0	0	0	0	+0	—
Total					25	7	3	15	46	57	−11	28.00

Last updated: 22 August 2018
Source: Competitions

=== Philippines Football League ===
Pos	Team	Pld	W	D	L	GF	GA	GD	Pts	Qualification or relegation
1	Ceres–Negros (C)	25	19	3	3	66	25	+41	60	Qualification for the AFC Champions League Preliminary Round 1 or AFC Cup Group Stage
2	Kaya–Iloilo	25	15	4	6	58	32	+26	49	
3	Davao Aguilas	25	11	6	8	52	39	+13	39	
4	Stallion Laguna	25	12	3	10	49	45	+4	36 (Note: Three points were deducted from Stallion Laguna due to the club's failure to comply with Liga Futbol Inc. Disciplinary Committee’s Decision No. 010318DC03.)	
5	JPV Marikina	25	7	2	16	46	63	−17	20 (Note: Three points were deducted from JPV Marikina due to the club's failure to comply with Liga Futbol Inc. Disciplinary Committee’s Decision No. 010318DC02.)	
6	Global Cebu	25	1	2	22	18	85	−67	5	

Source: Philippines Football League
Rules for classification: 1) Points; 2) Goal Difference; 3) Goals Scored
(C) Champions

==== Results summary ====
Overall								Home						Away					
Pld	W	D	L	GF	GA	GD	Pts	W	D	L	GF	GA	GD	W	D	L	GF	GA	GD
25	7	3	15	46	57	−11	21^{^{a}}	2	2	9	13	33	−20	5	1	6	33	24	+9

Last updated: 19 August 2018.
Source: Philippines Football League

Note:

- a Three points was deducted for JPV Marikina from the league standing due to the club's failure to comply with Liga Futbol Inc. Disciplinary Committee's Decision No. 010318DC02.

==== Results by round ====
Round	1	2	3	4	5	6	7	8	9	10	11	12	13	14	15	16	17	18	19	20	21	22	23	24	25
Ground	H	A	A	H	A	H	H	A	H	A	H	H	H	A	A	A	H	A	H	A	A	H	H	A	H
Result	W	W	L	L	L	L	L	L	L	W	D	L	L	L	W	L	D	L	L	W	W	L	W	D	L
Position	1	2	2	3	4	5	5	5	5	5	5	5	5	5	5	5	5	5	5	5	5	5	5	5	5

Updated to match(es) played on 19 August 2018. Source: Philippines Football League
A = Away; H = Home; W = Win; D = Draw; L = Loss

==== Matches ====
3 March 2018 1	JPV Marikina	2–1	Global Cebu	Marikina
19:00 UTC+8	Moriyasu 13'; Kozawa 75'	Report	Del Rosario 89'	Stadium: Marikina Sports Complex; Attendance: 423

11 March 2018 2	Stallion Laguna	1–2	JPV Marikina	Biñan
16:00 UTC+8	Tuason 44'	Report	Ko Kyung-joon 8' (o.g.); Altiche 90+3'	Stadium: Biñan Football Stadium

7 April 2018 3	Kaya–Iloilo	1–0	JPV Marikina	Makati^{a}
19:00 UTC+8	Giganto E. 13'	Report		Stadium: University of Makati Stadium

14 April 2018 4	JPV Marikina	0–3	Ceres–Negros	Manila^{b}
19:00 UTC+8		Report	Uesato 14', 30'; Marañón 64'	Stadium: Rizal Memorial Stadium

21 April 2018 5	Davao Aguilas	3–2	JPV Marikina	Manila^{c}
19:00 UTC+8	P. Younghusband 13', 55'; Kim 18'		Celiz 28'; Moriyasu 45+1'	Stadium: Rizal Memorial Stadium

28 April 2018 6	JPV Marikina	1–4	Ceres–Negros	Manila^{b}^{d}
16:00 UTC+8	T Suzuki 38'		Marañón 8'; Christiaens 20'; Reichelt 78', 83'	Stadium: Rizal Memorial Stadium; Attendance: 0^{d}

5 May 2018 7	JPV Marikina	1–4	Kaya–Iloilo	Biñan^{b}
16:00 UTC+8				Stadium: Biñan Football Stadium

13 May 2018 8	Davao Aguilas	4–2	JPV Marikina	Manila^{c}
16:00 UTC+8				Stadium: Rizal Memorial Stadium

19 May 2018 9	JPV Marikina	1–4	Stallion Laguna	Biñan^{b}
16:00 UTC+8				Stadium: Biñan Football Stadium

27 May 2018 10	Global Cebu	1–3	JPV Marikina	Biñan^{e}
19:00 UTC+8				Stadium: Biñan Football Stadium

2 June 2018 11	JPV Marikina	1–1	Ceres–Negros	Biñan^{b}
16:00 UTC+8				Stadium: Biñan Football Stadium

6 June 2018 12	JPV Marikina	1–4	Stallion Laguna	Biñan^{b}
16:00 UTC+8				Stadium: Biñan Football Stadium

9 June 2018 13	JPV Marikina	0–3	Davao Aguilas	Biñan^{b}
16:00 UTC+8				Stadium: Biñan Football Stadium

20 June 2018 14	Ceres–Negros	4–1	JPV Marikina	Bacolod
19:00 UTC+8				Stadium: Panaad Park and Stadium

23 June 2018 15	Ceres–Negros	0–2	JPV Marikina	Bacolod
19:00 UTC+8				Stadium: Panaad Park and Stadium

27 June 2018 16	Kaya–Iloilo	4–2	JPV Marikina	Iloilo City
15:00 UTC+8				Stadium: Iloilo Sports Complex

7 July 2018 17	JPV Marikina	3–3	Davao Aguilas	Carmona^{b}
16:00 UTC+8				Stadium: PFF National Training Center

14 July 2018 18	Stallion Laguna	3–2	JPV Marikina	Biñan
15:00 UTC+8				Stadium: Biñan Football Stadium

25 July 2018 19	JPV Marikina	0–3	Davao Aguilas	Carmona^{b}
15:00 UTC+8			Kim Sung-min 12'; P. Younghusband 53'; Salenga 65'	Stadium: PFF National Training Center

29 July 2018 20	Global Cebu	1–5	JPV Marikina	Carmona^{e}
15:00 UTC+8	M. Angeles 79'		Moriyasu 27'; Baguioro 32'; Celiz 65', 78'; A. Angeles 90'	Stadium: PFF National Training Centre

1 August 2018 21	Global Cebu	1–11	JPV Marikina	Carmona^{e}
15:00 UTC+8	Bricenio 54'		Moriyasu 20', 64', 83'; Angeles 21', 45'; Baguioro 22', 57', 78'; Sandoval 30'; Celiz 37'; Altiche 74'	Stadium: PFF National Training Centre

5 August 2018 22	JPV Marikina	0–3	Kaya–Iloilo	Carmona^{b}
15:00 UTC+8				Stadium: PFF National Training Centre

9 August 2018 23	JPV Marikina	3–0^{f} Awarded	Global Cebu	Marikina
16:00 UTC+8				Stadium: Marikina Sports Complex

15 August 2018 24	Stallion Laguna	1–1	JPV Marikina	Biñan
15:00 UTC+8				Stadium: Biñan Football Stadium

22 August 2018 25	JPV Marikina	1–3	Kaya–Iloilo	Carmona^{b}
15:00 UTC+8	Celix 7'		Mendy 32', 77'; Tacagni 81' (pen.)	Stadium: PFF Training Centre

Notes:

a Due to the unavailability of Iloilo Sports Complex, the match will be played in Kaya's previous "home" venue University of Makati Stadium.
b Due to the unavailability of Marikina Sports Complex, the match will be played in neutral venue Rizal Memorial Stadium or Biñan Football Stadium or PFF National Training Center.
c Due to the unavailability of Davao del Norte Sports Complex, the match will be played in Rizal Memorial Stadium.
d JPV Marikina FC was not able to mobilize adequate security personnel for the match. As a result, it was played without spectators.
e Due to the unavailability of Cebu City Sports Complex, the match will be played in neutral venue Biñan Football Stadium or PFF National Training Centre.
f Originally schedule on 11 July but the match was abandoned by Global Cebu. JPV Marikina won 3–0 by default.

=== Copa Paulino Alcantara ===
Pos	Team	Pld	W	D	L	GF	GA	GD	Pts	Qualification	KAY	JPV	GLO
1	Kaya–Iloilo	4	3	1	0	9	3	+6	10	Semi-finals	—	1–0	4–0
2	JPV Marikina	4	2	0	2	6	6	0	6	Semi-finals	0–1	—	4–3
3	Global Cebu	4	0	1	3	7	13	−6	1		3–3	1–2	—

Source: LFI

==== Group stage ====
15 September 2018 1	JPV Marikina	4–3	Global Cebu	Carmona^{a}
15:00 UTC+8	Moriyasu 28'; Uzoka 57'; Angeles 69'; Shimono 73'		Nikolić 38'; Roberts 65'; Lee Jeong-min 85'	Stadium: PFF National Training Centre

19 September 2018 2	Kaya–Iloilo	1–0	JPV Marikina	Manila^{b}
16:00 UTC+8	Osei 24'			Stadium: Rizal Memorial Stadium

26 September 2018 3	Global Cebu	1–2	JPV Marikina	Manila^{c}
19:00 UTC+8	Jarvis 77'		Uzoka 39'; Moriyasu 62'	Stadium: Rizal Memorial Stadium

17 October 2018 4	JPV Marikina	0–1	Kaya–Iloilo	Carmona^{a}
15:00 UTC+8			Lopez Mendy 5'	Stadium: PFF National Training Centre

Note:

a Due to the unavailability of Marikina Sports Complex, the match will be played in neutral venue PFF National Training Centre.
b Due to the unavailability of Iloilo Sports Complex, the match will be played in neutral venue Rizal Memorial Stadium.
c Due to the unavailability of Cebu City Sports Complex, the match will be played in neutral venue PFF National Training Centre.

==== Knockout stage ====
21 October 2017 Semi-Final	Davao Aguilas	6–1	JPV Marikina	Manila
17:00 UTC+8	Kim Sung-min 34', 52', 60', 74'; J. Younghusband 40' de Jong 50'		Altiche 73'	Stadium: Rizal Memorial Stadium

== Squad ==
=== League squad ===
As of 24 July 2017

Note: Flags indicate national team as defined under FIFA eligibility rules; some limited exceptions apply. Players may hold more than one non-FIFA nationality.

No.	Pos.	Nation	Player
1	GK	(Philippines) PHI	Felipe Tripulca Jr.
2	GK	(Philippines) PHI	Elijah Aban
3	DF	(Japan) JPN	Masaki Yanagawa
4	DF	(Philippines) PHI	Camelo Tacusalme (vice-captain)
5	MF	(Philippines) PHI	Jayson Cutamora
6	MF	(Philippines) PHI	Sean Patrick Kane
7	FW	(Japan) JPN	Takumi Uesato
8	MF	(Philippines) PHI	Ali Mahmoud
9	MF	(Philippines) PHI	Robert Cañedo (vice-captain)
10	FW	(Philippines) PHI	Satoshi Otomo
11	MF	(Japan) JPN	Takashi Odawara (Captain)
14	MF	(Philippines) PHI	Alen Angeles

No.	Pos.	Nation	Player
15	DF	(Philippines) PHI	Alexandro Elnar (vice-captain)
16	MF	(Japan) JPN	Atsushi Shimono
17	MF	(Philippines) PHI	Aaron Altiche
18	DF	(Philippines) PHI	David Basa
19	DF	(Philippines) PHI	Lemuel Unabia
20	FW	(Philippines) PHI	William Espinosa
21	FW	(Philippines) PHI	J Baguioro
22	DF	(Philippines) PHI	Kouichi Belgira
23	MF	(Philippines) PHI	John Celiz
24	DF	(Philippines) PHI	Jhoguev Ybañez
25	GK	(Philippines) PHI	Nelson Gasic
27	DF	(Philippines) PHI	Peter Fadrigalan
29	DF	(Philippines) PHI	Daishi Takano

== Transfers ==
=== Pre-season ===
==== In ====
Position	Player	Transferred from
FW	(Japan) Ryuki Kozawa	(Thailand) Lampang
	(Japan) Keigo Moriyasu	
DF	(Japan) Tsubasa Suzuki	(Japan) Nara Club
MF	(Philippines) (England) Charlie Beaton	(Philippines) Ilocos United
DF	(Philippines) Franco de la Torre	(Philippines) Meralco Manila
FW	(Philippines) Jim Flores	(Philippines) Meralco Manila
FW	(Philippines) (Sweden) Patrik Franksson	(Philippines) Kaya-Makati
	(Philippines) Lendon Marcojos	
MF	(Philippines) Jake Morallo	(Philippines) Meralco Manila
	(Philippines) Jay-R Sandoval	
DF	(Philippines) (England) Alvin Sarmiento	(Philippines) Meralco Manila
MF	(Philippines) (Nigeria) Kennedy Uzoka	(Philippines) Ilocos United
	(Philippines) Christian Villegas	(Philippines) Meralco Manila

==== Out ====
Position	Player	Transferred To
MF	(Philippines) Sean Patrick Kane	(Philippines) Ceres-Negros
FW	(Japan) Takumi Uesato	(Philippines) Ceres-Negros
MF	(Philippines) Camelo Tacusalme	(Philippines) Kaya-Makati

=== Mid-season ===
==== Out ====
Position	Player	Transferred To
GK	(Philippines) Felipe Tripuca Jr.	TBA
DF	(Philippines) Alvin Sarmiento	TBA
MF	(Philippines) (England) Charlie Beaton	TBA
MF	(Philippines) Jim Ashley Flores	TBA
MF	(Philippines) Jaime Poderoso Jr.	TBA
MF	(Philippines) Christian Villegas	TBA
FW	(Philippines) William Espinosa	TBA
