= 2018 Kaya F.C.–Iloilo season =

Kaya F.C.–Iloilo
2018 season
- Head coach: Noel Marcaida
- Stadium: Iloilo Sports Complex
- PFL: 2nd
- Copa Paulino Alcantara: Winners
- Top goalscorer: League: Robert Lopez Mendy (18); All: Robert Lopez Mendy (27)
Home colours	Away colours
- All statistics correct as of 27 March 2019.

The 2018 season was Kaya F.C.–Iloilo's 2nd season in the Philippines Football League (PFL), the top flight of Philippine football. In addition to the PFL, the club also competed in the Copa Paulino Alcantara.

On 6 February 2018, the club formerly known as Kaya F.C.–Makati moved from Makati to Iloilo City. They changed their name accordingly to Kaya F.C.–Iloilo. They finished second in the PFL and won the inaugural Copa Paulino Alcantara, earning qualification to the 2019 AFC Cup.

== Pre-season and friendlies ==
Win Draw Loss

=== Friendlies ===
25 January 2018	Kaya–Makati (Philippines)	2–1	(Malaysia) Sabah FA	Biñan
	Lopez-Mendy 7'; Tanton 75'	Report	Musa 45'	Stadium: Biñan Football Stadium

24 March 2018	Kaya–Iloilo (Philippines)	3–2	Fiji	Biñan
15:00	Osei 2'; Bedic 33'; Tacagni 82'	Report	Remueru 48'; Radrigai 90+2'	Stadium: Biñan Football Stadium

- Prior to February 6, 2018. The club was known as Kaya FC–Makati.

== Competitions ==
=== Overview ===
Competition	First match	Last match	Starting round	Final position	Record							
Competition	First match	Last match	Starting round	Final position	Pld	W	D	L	GF	GA	GD	Win %
Philippines Football League	4 April 2018	25 August 2018	Matchday 1	2nd	25	15	4	6	58	32	+26	60.00
Copa Paulino Alcantara	1 September 2018	27 October 2018	Group stage	Champions	6	5	1	0	13	5	+8	83.33
Total					31	20	5	6	71	37	+34	64.52

Last updated: 27 March 2019
Source: Competitions

=== Philippines Football League ===
Pos	Team	Pld	W	D	L	GF	GA	GD	Pts	Qualification or relegation
1	Ceres–Negros (C)	25	19	3	3	66	25	+41	60	Qualification for the AFC Champions League Preliminary Round 1 or AFC Cup Group Stage
2	Kaya–Iloilo	25	15	4	6	58	32	+26	49	
3	Davao Aguilas	25	11	6	8	52	39	+13	39	
4	Stallion Laguna	25	12	3	10	49	45	+4	36 (Note: Three points were deducted from Stallion Laguna due to the club's failure to comply with Liga Futbol Inc. Disciplinary Committee’s Decision No. 010318DC03.)	
5	JPV Marikina	25	7	2	16	46	63	−17	20 (Note: Three points were deducted from JPV Marikina due to the club's failure to comply with Liga Futbol Inc. Disciplinary Committee’s Decision No. 010318DC02.)	
6	Global Cebu	25	1	2	22	18	85	−67	5	

Source: Philippines Football League
Rules for classification: 1) Points; 2) Goal Difference; 3) Goals Scored
(C) Champions

==== Results summary ====
Overall								Home						Away					
Pld	W	D	L	GF	GA	GD	Pts	W	D	L	GF	GA	GD	W	D	L	GF	GA	GD
25	15	4	6	58	32	+26	49	9	2	1	34	11	+23	6	2	5	24	21	+3

Last updated: 25 August 2018.
Source: Philippines Football League

==== Results by round ====
Round	1	2	3	4	5	6	7	8	9	10	11	12	13	14	15	16	17	18	19	20	21	22	23	24	25
Ground	A	A	H	A	H	A	A	H	A	H	H	H	A	A	H	H	H	H	H	A	H	H	A	A	A
Result	D	L	W	L	W	W	W	W	L	W	W	D	L	W	W	W	D	L	L	W	W	W	D	W	W
Position	3	5	4	4	3	3	2	2	2	2	2	2	2	2	2	2	2	2	2	2	2	2	2	2	2

Updated to match(es) played on 25 August 2018. Source: Philippines Football League
A = Away; H = Home; W = Win; D = Draw; L = Loss

==== Matches ====
4 March 2018 1	Davao Aguilas	2–2	Kaya–Iloilo	Tagum
16:00 UTC+8	J. Younghusband 51', 58'	Report	Osei 18'; Tacagni 49'	Stadium: Davao del Norte Sports Complex

4 April 2018 2	Ceres–Negros	2–1	Kaya–Iloilo	Bacolod
19:00 UTC+8	Ma. Ott 75'; Mi. Ott 85'	Report	Mintah 64'	Stadium: Panaad Park and Stadium

7 April 2018 3	Kaya–Iloilo	1–0	JPV Marikina	Makati^{a}
19:00 UTC+8	Giganto E. 13'	Report		Stadium: University of Makati Stadium

14 April 2018 4	Stallion Laguna	3–1	Kaya–Iloilo	Biñan
16:00 UTC+8	Polli 52' (pen.); Melliza 70'; Arboleda 90+4'		Tanton 15'	Stadium: Biñan Football Stadium

22 April 2018 5	Kaya–Iloilo	4–1	Stallion Laguna	Makati^{a}
16:00 UTC+8	Bedic 4'; Mintah 18', 42'; Soriano 30'		Polli 50'	Stadium: University of Makati Stadium

5 May 2018 6	JPV Marikina	1–4	Kaya–Iloilo	Biñan^{b}
16:00 UTC+8				Stadium: Biñan Football Stadium

12 May 2018 7	Ceres–Negros	0–2	Kaya–Iloilo	Bacolod
19:00 UTC+8				Stadium: Panaad Park and Stadium

20 May 2018 8	Kaya–Iloilo	4–2	Davao Aguilas	Iloilo City
16:00 UTC+8				Stadium: Iloilo Sports Complex

23 May 2018 9	Global Cebu	3–1	Kaya–Iloilo	Biñan^{c}
16:00 UTC+8				Stadium: Biñan Football Stadium

1 June 2018 10	Kaya–Iloilo	3–0^{d} Awarded	Global Cebu	Iloilo City
				Stadium: Iloilo Sports Complex

2 June 2018 11	Kaya–Iloilo	2–1	Davao Aguilas	Iloilo City
16:00 UTC+8				Stadium: Iloilo Sports Complex

9 June 2018 12	Kaya–Iloilo	1–1	Ceres–Negros	Iloilo City
16:00 UTC+8				Stadium: Iloilo Sports Complex

20 June 2018 13	Davao Aguilas	3–1	Kaya–Iloilo	Manila^{e}
16:00 UTC+8				Stadium: Rizal Memorial Stadium

23 June 2018 14	Davao Aguilas	3–4	Kaya–Iloilo	Manila^{e}
16:00 UTC+8				Stadium: Rizal Memorial Stadium

27 June 2018 15	Kaya–Iloilo	4–2	JPV Marikina	Iloilo City
15:00 UTC+8				Stadium: Iloilo Sports Complex

4 July 2018 16	Kaya–Iloilo	4–2	Stallion Laguna	Iloilo City
15:00 UTC+8				Stadium: Iloilo Sports Complex

7 July 2018 17	Kaya–Iloilo	1–1	Ceres–Negros	Iloilo City
15:00 UTC+8				Stadium: Iloilo Sports Complex

11 July 2018 18	Kaya–Iloilo	0–1	Ceres–Negros	Iloilo City
19:00 UTC+8				Stadium: Iloilo Sports Complex

21 July 2018 19	Stallion Laguna	2–0	Kaya–Iloilo	Biñan
15:00 UTC+8				Stadium: Biñan Football Stadium

5 August 2018 20	JPV Marikina	0–3	Kaya–Iloilo	Carmona^{b}
15:00 UTC+8			Tanton 4'; Osei 8'; Mendy 45' (pen.)	Stadium: PFF National Training Centre

8 August 2018 21	Kaya–Iloilo	4–0	Global Cebu	Carmona^{a}
15:00 UTC+8	Mendy 55', 65'; Ugarte 83'; Bedic 90+1'			Stadium: PFF National Training Centre

11 August 2018 22	Kaya–Iloilo	6–0	Global Cebu	Iloilo City
15:00 UTC+8				Stadium: Iloilo Sports Complex

19 August 2018 23	Stallion Laguna	1–1	Kaya–Iloilo	Biñan
15:00 UTC+8				Stadium: Biñan Football Stadium

22 August 2018 24	JPV Marikina	1–3	Kaya–Iloilo	Carmona^{b}
15:00 UTC+8	Celix 7'		Mendy 32', 77'; Tacagni 81' (pen.)	Stadium: PFF National Training Centre

25 August 2018 25	Global Cebu	0–1	Kaya–Iloilo	Manila^{c}
16:00 UTC+8			Bedic 86'	Stadium: Rizal Memorial Stadium

Notes:

a Due to the unavailability of Iloilo Sports Complex, the match was played in their previous "home" venue, the University of Makati Stadium.
b Due to the unavailability of Marikina Sports Complex, the match was played in a neutral venue, the Biñan Football Stadium.
c Due to the unavailability of Cebu City Sports Complex, the match was played in a neutral venue, the Biñan Football Stadium.
d Originally scheduled on 2 May, the match was postponed to 1 June. Global Cebu eventually forfeited the match. Kaya-Iloilo won 3–0 by default.
e Due to the unavailability of Davao del Norte Sports Complex the match was played in a neutral venue, the Rizal Memorial Stadium.

=== Copa Paulino Alcantara ===
Pos	Team	Pld	W	D	L	GF	GA	GD	Pts	Qualification	KAY	JPV	GLO
1	Kaya–Iloilo	4	3	1	0	9	3	+6	10	Semi-finals	—	1–0	4–0
2	JPV Marikina	4	2	0	2	6	6	0	6	Semi-finals	0–1	—	4–3
3	Global Cebu	4	0	1	3	7	13	−6	1		3–3	1–2	—

Source: LFI

==== Group stage ====
1 September 2018 1	Kaya–Iloilo	4–0	Global Cebu	Manila^{a}
16:00 UTC+8	Lopez Mendy 23', 55', 62'; Tanton 49'			Stadium: Rizal Memorial Stadium

19 September 2018 2	Kaya–Iloilo	1–0	JPV Marikina	Manila^{a}
16:00 UTC+8	Osei 24'			Stadium: Rizal Memorial Stadium

23 September 2018 3	Global Cebu	3–3	Kaya–Iloilo	Manila^{b}
19:00 UTC+8	Beloya 3'; Beaton 56'; Jarvis 63'		Tanton 24'; Lopez Mendy 58', 73'	Stadium: Rizal Memorial Stadium

17 October 2018 4	JPV Marikina	0–1	Kaya–Iloilo	Carmona^{c}
15:00 UTC+8			Lopez Mendy 5'	Stadium: PFF National Training Centre

Notes:

a Due to the unavailability of Iloilo Sports Complex, the match was played in neutral venue Rizal Memorial Stadium.
b Due to the unavailability of Cebu City Sports Complex, the match was played in neutral venue Rizal Memorial Stadium.
c Due to the unavailability of Marikina Sports Complex, the match was played in neutral venue PFF National Training Centre.

==== Knockout stage ====
21 October 2017 Semi-Final	Kaya–Iloilo	3–2	Stallion Laguna	Iloilo City
14:30 UTC+8	Lopez Mendy 3', 15', 47'		Arboleda 20'; Polli 43'	Stadium: Iloilo Sports Complex

==== Final ====
27 October 2018 Championship	Davao Aguilas	0–1 (a.e.t.)	Kaya–Iloilo	Manila
19:00 UTC+8			Bedic 119'	Stadium: Rizal Memorial Stadium

== Squad ==
As of 13 August 2018

Note: Flags indicate national team as defined under FIFA eligibility rules; some limited exceptions apply. Players may hold more than one non-FIFA nationality.

No.	Pos.	Nation	Player
1	GK	PHI	Ref Cuaresma
3	DF	PHI	Julian Matthews
4	MF	JPN	Masanari Omura (Vice-captain)
6	MF	PHI	Adam Reed
7	MF	PHI	Jovin Bedic
8	MF	PHI	Anton Ugarte
9	MF	PHI	Kenshiro Daniels
10	MF	PHI	Miguel Tanton
11	DF	PHI	Alexander Borromeo (Captain)
12	DF	PHI	Jayson Panhay
13	FW	PHI	Janrick Soriano
15	MF	PHI	Arnie Pasinabo

No.	Pos.	Nation	Player
16	DF	GHA	Alfred Osei
17	FW	SEN	Robert Lopez Mendy
19	MF	PHI	Eric Giganto
20	FW	PHI	Patrik Franksson
21	DF	PHI	Jalsor Soriano
22	GK	PHI	Zach Banzon
23	MF	PHI	Charlie Beaton
24	MF	PHI	Marwin Angeles
25	DF	PHI	Chy Villasenor
28	FW	GHA	Jordan Mintah
30	GK	PHI	Ronilo Bayan

=== Pre-season transfer ===
==== In ====
Position	Player	Transferred from
DF	(Philippines) Camelo Tacusalme	(Philippines) JPV Marikina
DF	(Philippines) Audie Menzi	(Philippines) Kaya Makati B
DF/MF	(Philippines) Michael Menzi	(Philippines) Kaya Makati B
MF	(Philippines) Arnel Amita	(Philippines) Meralco Manila
FW	(Philippines) (England) Connor Tacagni	(Philippines) Meralco Manila
GK	(Philippines) Nathanael Villanueva	(Philippines) Meralco Manila

==== Out ====
Position	Player	Transferred to
MF	(Philippines) (England) Adam Reed	(Philippines) Davao Aguilas
MF	(Philippines) (Italy) Marvin Angeles	
DF	(Philippines) (Australia) Julian Matthews	
DF	(Philippines) (Sweden) Patrik Franksson	
DF	(Ghana) Alfred Osei	
