= 2017 Kaya FC–Makati season =

Kaya F.C. Makati
2017 season
- Head coach: Chris Greatwich
- Stadium: University of Makati Stadium
- PFL: 3rd (Regular Season); 4th (Final Series)
- Top goalscorer: League: All: Jordan Mintah (17)
Home colours	Away colours
- All statistics correct as of 15 December 2017.

The 2017 season is Kaya FC—Makati's 1st season in the top flight of Philippines football.

== Competitions ==
=== Philippines Football League ===
Pos	Team	Pld	W	D	L	GF	GA	GD	Pts	Qualification or relegation
1	Meralco Manila	28	17	7	4	43	33	+10	58	Qualification for finals series
2	Ceres–Negros (C)	28	17	6	5	76	27	+49	57	Qualification for finals series
3	Kaya FC–Makati	28	14	5	9	52	35	+17	47	Qualification for finals series
4	Global Cebu	28	13	8	7	47	37	+10	47	Qualification for finals series
5	Stallion Laguna	28	9	8	11	39	49	−10	35	
6	JPV Marikina	28	9	6	13	42	48	−6	33	
7	Davao Aguilas	28	4	10	14	35	56	−21	22	
8	Ilocos United	28	1	6	21	24	73	−49	9	

Source: Philippines Football League
Rules for classification: 1) Points; 2) Goal Difference; 3) Goals Scored
(C) Champions

==== Regular season ====
6 May 2017 1	Kaya FC–Makati	1–1	Ceres–Negros	Makati
16:00 UTC+8	Ramsay 44'	Report	Angeles 90'	Stadium: University of Makati Stadium

20 May 2017 2	Kaya FC–Makati	2–0	Davao Aguilas	Makati
19:00 UTC+8				Stadium: University of Makati Stadium

24 May 2017 3	Global Cebu	3–1	Kaya FC–Makati	Cebu City
19:00 UTC+8				Stadium: Cebu City Sports Complex

31 May 2017 4	Ilocos United	2–4	Kaya FC–Makati	Bantay^{b}
19:00 UTC+8				Stadium: Quirino Stadium

4 June 2017 5	Kaya FC–Makati	1–0	Stallion Laguna	Makati
16:00 UTC+8				Stadium: University of Makati Stadium

17 June 2017 6	Kaya FC–Makati	0–2	Meralco Manila	Makati
16:00 UTC+8				Stadium: University of Makati Stadium

17 June 2017 7	Ceres–Negros	3–1	Kaya FC–Makati	Bacolod
16:00 UTC+8				Stadium: Panaad Stadium

2 July 2017 8	Kaya FC–Makati	2–2	Global Cebu	Makati
16:00 UTC+8				Stadium: University of Makati Stadium

5 July 2017 9	Stallion Laguna	1–3	Kaya FC–Makati	Biñan
16:00 UTC+8				Stadium: Biñan Football Stadium

9 July 2017 10	Davao Aguilas	1–5	Kaya FC–Makati	Tagum
16:00 UTC+8				Stadium: Davao del Norte Sports Complex

16 July 2017 11	Kaya FC–Makati	2–0	JPV Marikina	Makati
16:00 UTC+8				Stadium: University of Makati Stadium

19 July 2017 12	Kaya FC–Makati	5–2	Ilocos United	Makati
19:00 UTC+8				Stadium: University of Makati Stadium

23 July 2017 13	Kaya FC–Makati	2–1	Ilocos United	Makati
19:00 UTC+8				Stadium: University of Makati Stadium

30 July 2017 14	Stallion Laguna	1–1	Kaya FC–Makati	Biñan
19:00 UTC+8				Stadium: Biñan Football Stadium

5 August 2017 15	Meralco Manila	2–1	Kaya FC–Makati	Manila
19:00 UTC+8				Stadium: Rizal Memorial Stadium

12 August 2017 16	Kaya FC–Makati	2–3	Ceres–Negros	Makati
16:00 UTC+8				Stadium: University of Makati Stadium

16 August 2017 17	Kaya FC–Makati	2–2	JPV Marikina	Makati
16:00 UTC+8				Stadium: University of Makati Stadium

19 August 2017 18	Global Cebu	0–0	Kaya FC–Makati	Manila^{a}
19:00 UTC+8				Stadium: Rizal Memorial Stadium

6 September 2017 19	JPV Marikina	0–3	Kaya FC–Makati	Biñan^{c}
16:00 UTC+8				Stadium: Biñan Football Stadium

Match deemed a forfeiture due to home stadium unavailability. Originally scheduled on 27 May 2017. Kaya awarded a 0-3 win.

10 September 2017 20	JPV Marikina	1–0	Kaya FC–Makati	Manila^{c}
16:00 UTC+8				Stadium: Rizal Memorial Stadium

17 September 2017 21	Ilocos United	0–1	Kaya FC–Makati	Bantay^{b}
16:00 UTC+8				Stadium: Quirino Stadium

23 September 2017 22	Kaya FC–Makati	4–0	Stallion Laguna	Makati
16:00 UTC+8				Stadium: University of Makati Stadium

30 September 2017 23	Kaya FC–Makati	2–1	Meralco Manila	Makati
16:00 UTC+8				Stadium: University of Makati Stadium

14 October 2017 24	Ceres–Negros	3–2	Kaya FC–Makati	Bacolod
19:00 UTC+8	Marañón 10'; Rodriguez 15', 90+4'		Mintah 3'; Osei 56'	Stadium: Panaad Stadium

21 October 2017 25	Kaya FC–Makati	2–0	Global Cebu	Makati
16:00 UTC+8	Mintah 7'; Giganto 74'			Stadium: University of Makati Stadium

25 October 2017 26	Davao Aguilas	0–2	Kaya FC–Makati	Tagum
16:00 UTC+8			Mintah 45'; Tanton 62'	Stadium: Davao del Norte Sports Complex

28 October 2017 27	Meralco Manila	1–0	Kaya FC–Makati	Manila
19:00 UTC+8				Stadium: Rizal Memorial Stadium

18 November 2017 28	Kaya FC–Makati	1–3	Davao Aguilas	Makati
19:00 UTC+8				Stadium: University of Makati Stadium

Note:

- a Because of the ongoing works in the University of San Carlos Stadium, the team will play its first few league games at the Rizal Memorial Stadium in Manila and will have to groundshare with Meralco Manila.
- b The home stadium of the club is located in Bantay, Ilocos Sur, a nearby town of Vigan. For administrative and marketing purposes, the home city of Ilocos United is designated as "Vigan"
- c Because of the ongoing works in the Marikina Sports Complex, the team will play its first few league games at the Biñan Football Stadium and Rizal Memorial Stadium and will have to groundshare with Stallion Laguna and Meralco Manila, respectively.

==== Final Series ====
3 December 2017 Semi Final Leg 1	Kaya FC–Makati	0–1	Ceres–Negros	Makati
16:00 UTC+8			Schröck 90+4'	Stadium: University of Makati Stadium

9 December 2017 Semi Final Leg 2	Ceres–Negros	2–1 (3–1 agg.)	Kaya FC–Makati	Bacolod
19:00 UTC+8	Marañón 30'; Ramsay 73'		Ugarte 43'	Stadium: Panaad Stadium

Ceres–Negros won 3–1 on aggregate.

16 December 2017 Battle for Third	Meralco Manila	3–1	Kaya FC–Makati	Manila
16:00 UTC+8	Cañas 4'; Dizon 16', 24'		Bedic 58'	Stadium: Rizal Memorial Stadium

== Squad ==
As of 16 February 2017

Note: Flags indicate national team as defined under FIFA eligibility rules; some limited exceptions apply. Players may hold more than one non-FIFA nationality.

No.	Pos.	Nation	Player
1	GK	(Philippines) PHI	Ref Cuaresma
3	DF	(Philippines) PHI	Julian Matthews
4	MF	(Japan) JPN	Masanari Omura (Vice-captain)
6	MF	(Philippines) PHI	Adam Reed
7	MF	(Philippines) PHI	Jovin Bedic
8	MF	(Philippines) PHI	Anton Ugarte
9	MF	(Philippines) PHI	Kenshiro Daniels
10	MF	(Philippines) PHI	Miguel Tanton
11	DF	(Philippines) PHI	Alexander Borromeo (Captain)
12	DF	(Philippines) PHI	Jayson Panhay
13	FW	(Philippines) PHI	Janrick Soriano
15	MF	(Philippines) PHI	Marvin Angeles

No.	Pos.	Nation	Player
16	DF	(Ghana) GHA	Alfred Osei
17	FW	(Senegal) SEN	Robert Lopez Mendy
19	MF	(Philippines) PHI	Eric Giganto
20	FW	(Philippines) PHI	Patrik Franksson
21	DF	(Philippines) PHI	Jalsor Soriano
22	GK	(Philippines) PHI	Zach Banzon
23	MF	(Philippines) PHI	Charlie Beaton
24	MF	(Philippines) PHI	Marwin Angeles
25	DF	(Philippines) PHI	Chy Villasenor
28	FW	(Ghana) GHA	Jordan Mintah
30	GK	(Philippines) PHI	Ronilo Bayan
