= 2012 UFL Cup =

2012 United Football Cup
Tournament details
- Country: Philippines
- Dates: September 15 - December 17, 2012
- Teams: 28

Final positions
- Champions: Stallion (1st title)
- Runners-up: Global

Tournament statistics
- Matches played: 61
- Goals scored: 223 (3.66 per match)
- Top goal scorer(s): (Philippines) Phil Younghusband (10 goals)

Awards
- Best player: (Philippines) Ruben Doctora Jr.

The 2012 United Football League Cup was the fourth edition of the United Football League Cup that ran from September 15 to December 17, 2012. This edition consisted of 28 teams which separated into four groups of five.

Starting this edition, there were 2 stages in the competition. The first stage competed between UFL Division 2 teams and guest teams, while the second stage included UFL Division 1 teams. The top 10 teams of the Cup moved to the knockout stage of the 2013 PFF National Men's Club Championship.

Philippine Air Force were the defending champions.

On December 17, 2012, Stallion defeated Global with a 2–1 scoreline to win their first ever UFL Cup.

== Stage 1 ==
This edition saw entry of nine clubs: Mondoñedo Internacionale FC, International FC Philippines, General Trias International FC, Sta. Lucia Mustangs FC, Primero Atletico Cavite FC, Blue Guards FC, Bright Star FC, Mendiola FC 1991 and FC Masbate. These clubs must beat UFL 2nd Division clubs twice to advance to Stage 2. Once a Division Two team beats a guest club the latter will be out of the competition.

All times are Philippine Standard Time (PST) – UTC+8.

September 22, 2012	Forza	0 – 2	Mondoñedo Internacionale FC	NUVALI Field #1, Nuvali, Santa Rosa, Laguna
14:00			Yapi 5'; Mirghani 33'

September 25, 2012	Forza	2 – 1	Mondoñedo Internacionale FC	University of Makati Stadium, Makati
21:00

September 22, 2012	Team Socceroo	2 – 0	International FC (Philippines)	NUVALI Field #2, Nuvali, Santa Rosa, Laguna
14:00	Duruachazie 21'; Angus 83'

September 22, 2012	Manila All-Japan	0 – 5	General Trias International FC	ASCom Football Field, Taguig
16:00

September 26, 2012	Manila All-Japan	0 – 5	General Trias International FC	University of Makati Stadium, Makati
19:00

September 22, 2012 (Note: Match Stopped. Scheduled for Monday, Sep 24 at 7 pm at UMak. Further, in the event that Sta. Lucia beats Union, the 2nd match will be played thereafter with 15 mins break in between the 2 matches.)	Union Internacional Manila	0 – 0 (a.e.t.) (3 – 4 p)	Sta. Lucia Mustangs FC	NUVALI Field #1, Nuvali, Santa Rosa, Laguna
16:00
	Penalties
	Penalty scored Penalty missed		Penalty scored Penalty missed

September 24, 2012	Union Internacional Manila	2 – 3 (a.e.t.)	Sta. Lucia Mustangs FC	University of Makati Stadium, Makati
17:00

September 22, 2012 (Note: Match Stopped. Scheduled for Tuesday, Sep 25 at 7 pm at UMak. Further, in the event that Primero Cavite Atletico FC beats Laos FC, the 2nd match will be played thereafter with 15 mins break in between the 2 matches. .)	Laos FC	3 – 3 (a.e.t.) (3 – 4 p)	Primero Atletico Cavite FC	NUVALI Field #2, Nuvali, Santa Rosa, Laguna
16:00	Lear 39'; Ghasemi 59'; Villegas 90+9'		Obrero 1', 90+16'; Cainglet 18'
	Penalties
	Penalty scored Penalty missed		Penalty scored Penalty missed

September 25, 2012	Laos FC	5 – 0	Primero Atletico Cavite FC	University of Makati Stadium, Makati
19:00

September 23, 2012	Dolphins United	3 – 0	Blue Guards FC	ASCom Football Field, Taguig
14:00	Cuyos 20'; Saluria 81', 90'

September 23, 2012	Agila	0 – 1	Bright Star FC	ASCom Football Field, Taguig
18:00			Dorbor 87'

September 26, 2012	Agila	3 – 2	Bright Star FC	University of Makati Stadium, Makati
21:00

September 23, 2012	Mendiola FC 1991	4 – 0	FC Masbate	ASCom Football Field, Taguig
10:00	Piedmonte 35', 46'; Cabug 81', 88'

Teams advancing from Stage One will join UFL’s Division One teams in the group-stage draw. The draw was held on September 28, 2012.

== Stage 2 ==
Clubs qualified from Stage 1

- Team Socceroo
- Dolphins United
- Mendiola FC 1991
- Sta. Lucia Mustangs FC
- Laos FC
- Forza FC
- General Trias International FC
- Agila

UFL Division 1 Clubs qualified for Stage 2

- Global
- Kaya
- Loyola
- Stallion
- Air Force
- Pasargad
- Nomads
- Green Archers United
- Army
- Pachanga

UFL Division 2 Clubs qualified for Stage 2

- Navy
- Diliman

Key to colours in group tables
Group winners and runners-up advance to the knock out stage and will move to 2013 PFF National Men's Club Championship
Third-placed teams that will be ranked from highest to lowest, two highest will move to 2013 PFF National Men's Club Championship

All times are Philippine Standard Time (PST) – UTC+8.

=== Group A ===
Team	Pld	W	D	L	GF	GA	GD	Pts
Global	4	3	1	0	18	1	+17	10
General Trias International FC	4	2	2	0	8	1	+7	8
Pasargad	4	2	1	1	13	4	+9	7
Team Socceroo	4	1	0	3	1	21	−20	3
Philippine Navy	4	0	0	4	0	13	−13	0

October 2, 2012	Global	3 – 1	Pasargad	Rizal Memorial Stadium, Manila
17:00	I. Elhabbib 15' de Murga 39'; Bahadoran 54'		Shedideh 65'

October 4, 2012	Philippine Navy	0 – 5	General Trias International FC	University of Makati Stadium, Makati
19:00		Report	Lee K.H. 7'; Nam G.Y. 24'; Song M.S. 59', 74'; Do H.C. 78'

October 7, 2012	Global	0 – 0	General Trias International FC	NUVALI Field #3, Santa Rosa, Laguna
14:00		Report

October 11, 2012	General Trias International FC	2 – 0	Team Socceroo	University of Makati Stadium, Makati
21:00	Song M.S. 50'; Lee J.M. 64'	Report

October 13, 2012	Philippine Navy	0 – 3	Pasargad	University of Makati Stadium, Makati
20:00		Report	Jamali 37'; Shedideh 68'; Mbata Ameachi 92'

October 14, 2012	Team Socceroo	0 – 11	Global	Nomads Sports Club, Parañaque
18:00		Report	I. Elhabbib 11', 27', 38', 51'; Obiang 18', 35', 88'; Rodriguez 25'; Barbaso 76'; Nnabuife 83', 90'

October 20, 2012	Pasargad	8 – 0	Team Socceroo	University of Makati Stadium, Makati
16:00	Nefasati 19'; Jamali 20', 23'; Hajimhedi 89'; Shedideh 40', 69', 77', 90'	Report

October 20, 2012	Philippine Navy	0 – 4	Global	University of Makati Stadium, Makati
18:00		Report	I. Elhabbib 46'; Obiang 46' (pen.) 50'; Capolei 57'

October 30, 2012	General Trias International FC	1 – 1	Pasargad	University of Makati Stadium, Makati
17:15	Song J.H. 8'	Report	Shedideh 48'

November 4, 2012	Team Socceroo	1 – 0	Philippine Navy	ASCom Football Field, Taguig
15:30

=== Group B ===
Team	Pld	W	D	L	GF	GA	GD	Pts
Green Archers United	4	3	1	0	15	3	+12	10
Kaya	4	3	1	0	11	1	+10	10
Forza	4	1	1	2	3	6	−3	4
Diliman	4	0	2	2	0	4	−4	2
Dolphins United	4	0	1	3	2	17	−15	1

October 2, 2012	Kaya	1 – 1	Green Archers United	Rizal Memorial Stadium, Manila
19:00	Burkey 5'	Report	Pasilan 88'

October 4, 2012	Diliman	0 – 0	Forza	University of Makati Stadium, Makati
21:00		Report

October 7, 2012	Kaya	2 – 0	Forza	NUVALI Field #1, Santa Rosa, Laguna
16:00	Burkey 6', 37'	Report

October 9, 2012	Kaya	1 – 0	Diliman	Rizal Memorial Stadium, Manila
17:15	Romero 40'	Report

October 9, 2012	Green Archers United	7 – 2	Dolphins United	Rizal Memorial Stadium, Manila
19:15	Pasinabo 14'; Pasilan 25'; Aguisanda 46'; Melliza 64', 90'; Villa 74'; Ayi 83'	Report	Echin 73'; Salenga 77'

October 13, 2012	Dolphins United	0 – 0	Diliman	University of Makati Stadium, Makati
16:00		Report

October 18, 2012	Forza	3 – 0	Dolphins United	University of Makati Stadium, Makati
19:00	Pascal 15'; Agyei 63', 67'	Report

October 18, 2012	Green Archers United	3 – 0	Diliman	University of Makati Stadium, Makati
21:00	Melizza 14' (pen.); Pasilan 40', 47'	Report

October 21, 2012	Dolphins United	0 – 7	Kaya	Nomads Sports Club, Parañaque
20:30		Report	Ugarte 37', 72'; Romero 55', 79'; Porteria 61'; Burkey 67', 68'

October 24, 2012	Forza	0 – 4	Green Archers United	University of Makati Stadium, Makati
19:00		Report	Aguinsada 14'; Cagayanan 43'; Pasilan 63'; Villareal 67'

=== Group C ===
Team	Pld	W	D	L	GF	GA	GD	Pts
Loyola	4	3	0	1	23	4	+19	9
Pachanga Diliman	4	3	0	1	8	4	+4	9
Manila Nomads	4	3	0	1	10	10	0	9
Laos	4	0	1	3	4	7	−3	1
Mendiola FC 1991	4	0	1	3	3	23	−20	1

October 7, 2012	Mendiola FC 1991	0 – 3	Pachanga Diliman	NUVALI Field #2, Santa Rosa, Laguna
14:00		Report	Zerrudo 37', 90'; Cunliffe 71' (pen.)

October 7, 2012	Laos	0 – 1	Nomads	NUVALI Field #3, Santa Rosa, Laguna
16:00		Report	Connolly 72'

October 11, 2012	Laos	1 – 2	Loyola	University of Makati Stadium, Makati
19:00	Villanueva 84'	Report	Gould 14'; J. Younghusband 45+1'

October 16, 2012	Nomads	1 – 0	Pachanga Diliman	Marikina Sports Complex, Marikina
19:30	Ashime 30' (o.g.)	Report

October 20, 2012	Pachanga Diliman	2 – 1	Loyola	University of Makati Stadium, Makati
20:00	Appiah 59'; Zerrudo 70'	Report	Jeong 43'

October 21, 2012	Laos	1 – 1	Mendiola FC 1991	University of Makati Stadium, Makati
18:00	Daniels 69'	Report	Piedmonte 47' (pen.)

October 23, 2012	Loyola	8 – 1	Nomads	Rizal Memorial Stadium, Manila
19:30	P. Younghusband 17', 29', 70'; Jeong 40'; J. Younghusband 49'; Gonzales 58'; Morallo 75', 80'	Report	Cardoso 8'

October 28, 2012	Nomads	7 – 2	Mendiola FC 1991	University of Makati Stadium, Makati
16:00	de Rama 29'; Connolly 71'; Borrill 76', 84'; Arroyo 77', 91'; Enrile 82'	Report	Orcullo 23'; Alhassan 59'

November 5, 2012	Mendiola FC 1991	0 – 12	Loyola	University of Makati Stadium, Makati
19:00			P. Younghusband 8', 22', 34', 76', 86'; Jeong 12', 53'; Jo Won Jang 32'; M. A. Hartmann 40'; Gould 57'; Fadrigalan 71'; Wong 82'

November 5, 2012	Pachanga Diliman	3 – 2	Laos	University of Makati Stadium, Makati
21:00

=== Group D ===
Team	Pld	W	D	L	GF	GA	GD	Pts
Stallion	4	3	0	1	19	3	+16	9
Philippine Army	4	2	2	0	6	2	+4	8
Philippine Air Force	4	1	2	1	4	6	−2	5
Sta. Lucia Mustangs FC	4	1	2	1	4	7	−3	5
Agila	4	0	0	4	0	15	−15	0

October 7, 2012	Philippine Army	2 – 0	Stallion	NUVALI Field #1, Santa Rosa, Laguna
14:00	Becite 37'; Brillantes 44'	Report

October 7, 2012	Philippine Air Force	2 – 0	Agila	NUVALI Field #2, Santa Rosa, Laguna
16:00	Barsales 14'; Bela-Ong 84'	Report

October 13, 2012	Agila	0 – 2	Philippine Army	University of Makati Stadium, Makati
18:00		Report	Cain 80'; Becite 92'

October 16, 2012	Stallion	6 – 0	Sta. Lucia Mustangs FC	Marikina Sports Complex, Marikina
17:15	Rufino 9', 23', 25', 35', 67'; Pi Yong Jae 86'	Report

October 21, 2012	Sta. Lucia Mustangs FC	3 – 0	Agila	Nomads Sports Club, Parañaque
18:30	Lee Dong Bin 20', 31'; J. Clariño 72'	Report

October 23, 2012	Philippine Air Force	1 – 1	Philippine Army	Rizal Memorial Stadium, Manila
17:15	Araneta 46'	Report	Bedua 15'

October 28, 2012	Philippine Army	1 – 1	Sta. Lucia Mustangs FC	University of Makati Stadium, Makati
18:00	Gempisaw 64'	Report	Kim Da Bin 24'

October 28, 2012	Agila	0 – 8	Stallion	University of Makati Stadium, Makati
20:00		Report	R. Doctora 7', 9'; Lee Jo-Young 26', 27'; M.J. Clariño 37' de Jong 53', 81'; Nam Yeul-Woo 85'

October 30, 2012	Stallion	5 – 1	Philippine Air Force	University of Makati Stadium, Makati
19:30	Rufino 8', 43'; Cañas 56'; Lee Jo-Young 58'; M.J. Clariño 72'	Report	Araneta 84'

November 4, 2012	Sta. Lucia Mustangs FC	0 – 0	Philippine Air Force	Nomads Sports Club, Parañaque
20:30		Report

=== Ranking of group third placed teams ===
The two best third place teams among all groups qualify for 2013 PFF National Men's Club Championship. They are determined by the parameters in this order:

1. Highest number of points
2. Goal difference
3. Highest number of goals scored (goals for)

Grp	Team	Pld	W	D	L	GF	GA	GD	Pts
C	Manila Nomads	4	3	0	1	10	10	0	9
A	Pasargad	4	2	1	1	12	2	+10	7
D	Philippine Air Force	4	1	2	1	4	6	−2	5
B	Forza	4	1	1	2	3	6	−3	4

== Knockout stage ==
Quarter-finals
November 6 - Makati
Global (a.e.t.)	2
Kaya	1
November 8 - Makati
Loyola	5
Philippine Army	0
November 8 - Parañaque
Green Archers United (p)	1 (4)
Pachanga Diliman	1 (3)
November 8 - Makati
Stallion (p)	0 (5)
General Trias International	0 (4)

Semi-finals
November 13 - Manila
Global	2
Loyola	1
November 13 - Manila
Green Archers United	1
Stallion (a.e.t.)	3

Final
December 17- Manila
Global	1
Stallion	2
Third place
December 17- Manila
Loyola	4
Green Archers United	1

=== Quarter-finals ===
November 6, 2012	Global	2 – 1 (a.e.t.)	Kaya	University of Makati Stadium, Makati
19:00	Omphroy 33'; Bahadoran 92'	Report	Mallari 45+1'

November 8, 2012	Loyola	5 – 0	Philippine Army	University of Makati Stadium, Makati
17:00	M. A. Hartmann 6', 76', 80'; Jeong 32'; P. Younghusband 69'	Report

November 8, 2012	Stallion	0 – 0 (a.e.t.) (5 – 4 p)	General Trias International FC	University of Makati Stadium, Makati
19:00		Report
	Penalties
	Y. Lee (penalty scored); Clarino (penalty scored); H. Kim (penalty scored); P. Yong (penalty scored); Rufino (penalty missed); N. Y. Woo (penalty scored)		K. Lee (penalty scored); N. Geun (penalty scored); G. Shin (penalty scored); J. Kim (penalty scored); H. Do (penalty missed) ??? (penalty missed)

November 8, 2012	Green Archers United	1 – 1 (a.e.t.) (4 – 3 p)	Pachanga Diliman	Nomads Sports Club, Parañaque
20:30	Melliza 6'	Report	Zerudo 22'
	Penalties
	Villareal (penalty scored); Bocobo (penalty scored); Mensah (penalty missed); Pasilan (penalty scored); Ayi (penalty scored)		Gonzalez (penalty missed); Cunliffe (penalty missed); Bedic (penalty scored); Diop (penalty scored); Canedo (penalty scored)

=== Semi-finals ===
November 13, 2012	Global	2 – 1	Loyola	Rizal Memorial Stadium, Manila
17:00	Obiang 6'; I. Elhabbib 83'	Report	J. Younghusband 86'

November 13, 2012	Stallion	3 – 1 (a.e.t.)	Green Archers United	Rizal Memorial Stadium, Manila
19:00	Doctora 71', 100'; W. Lee 99'	Report	Pasilan 55'

The Third-place playoff and Finals matches were originally scheduled on November 19 at the Rizal Memorial Stadium, but were postponed on a later date, since some players playing for the clubs are on national duty as members of the Philippine national team competing in the 2012 AFF Suzuki Cup. The actual date depended on how the national team fared in the international tournament. As the national team only reached the semi-finals, the matches were scheduled on December 17.

=== Third-place playoff ===
December 17, 2012	Loyola	4 – 1	Green Archers United	Rizal Memorial Stadium, Manila
17:00	M. A. Hartmann 14', 29'; Jeong 23'; P. Younghusband 62'	Report	Ayi 10'

=== Final ===
December 17, 2012	Global	1 – 2	Stallion	Rizal Memorial Stadium, Manila
19:00	I. Elhabbib 25'	Report	Doctora 24'; Rufino 61'

== Top goalscorers ==
Top Goal Scorers starting Stage 2 of the 2012 United Football Cup

Rank	Player	Club	Goals
1	(Philippines) Phil Younghusband	Loyola	10
2	(Iran) Masood Shadideh	Pasargad	8
2	(Spain) Rufo Sánchez	Stallion	8
2	(Sudan) Izzo El Habbib	Global	8
3	(Philippines) Tating Pasilan	Green Archers United	7

Correct as of 11:00, December 18, 2012
Source: 2012 UFL Cup Goals

== Awards ==
The following were the competition’s top individual awardees.

- Golden Gloves: (Philippines) Wilson Munoz (Stallion)
- Golden Boot: (Philippines) Phil Younghusband (Loyola)
- Golden Ball: (Philippines) Ruben Doctora Jr. (Stallion)
