= TSFC =

TSFC may refer to:

- Shandong Taishan F.C.
- Team Socceroo F.C.
- Team Solent F.C.
- Thrust specific fuel consumption
- Tourette Syndrome Foundation of Canada
