= Uesato =

Uesato (written: 上里) is a Japanese surname. Notable people with the surname include:

- Kazumasa Uesato (上里 一将, born 1986), Japanese footballer
- Takumi Uesato (上里 琢文, born 1990), Japanese footballer
