= Tating Pasilan =

Filipino footballer

Christian Pasilan
Personal information
- Full name: Christian Floriano Pasilan Jr.
- Date of birth: 4 January 1986 (age 40)
- Place of birth: San Carlos, Negros Occidental, Philippines
- Position: Forward

Team information
- Current team: Green Archers United
- Number: 12

Youth career
- University of St. La Salle

Senior career*
Years	Team	Apps	(Gls)
2009	Kaya		
2010–	Green Archers United	57	(23)

International career^{‡}
2008	Philippines	2	(0)
- * Club domestic league appearances and goals as of 28 February 2013 ‡ National team caps and goals as of 26 March 2013

Christian Floriano "Tating" Pasilan Jr., is a Filipino footballer who plays as a striker and currently the team captain of Green Archers United in the United Football League. He is also a member of the Philippine national football team and a current coach of De La Salle Zobel grade school football team.

== International career ==
In 2008, he earned his full international caps in the AFC Challenge Cup qualifiers in Iloilo and the ASEAN Football Federation qualifiers in Cambodia. In January and February 2013, he was one of the players called up for Philippine national football team training in preparation for 2014 AFC Challenge Cup Qualifiers to be held in Manila, Philippines.
