= 2010 United Football League =

Philippine football league season

United Football League (Philippines)
- Season: 2010
- Champions: Division 1: Philippine Air Force (1st Title); Division 2: Global (1st Title)
- Promoted: Global (to Division 1)

The 2010 United Football League (known as the LBC United Football League for sponsorship reasons) was the first season of the United Football League. After the success of UFL Cup, the clubs that would comprise the Division 1 and Division 2 was set. The season began on 24 January 2010.

The Philippine Air Force won the first season league title in the Division 1.

Global was successfully promoted to 2011 United Football League (Philippines) Division 1 after topping the second division with an unbeaten record.

== Division 1 ==
Pos	Team	Pld	W	D	L	GF	GA	GD	Pts
1	Philippine Air Force (C)	14	10	3	1	42	17	+25	33
2	Kaya	14	9	1	4	41	13	+28	28
3	Union (Note: Union withdrew from UFL Division 1 and join UFL Division 2 on the following season.)	14	8	3	3	24	14	+10	27
4	Loyola Agila	14	7	1	6	16	19	−3	22
5	Philippine Army	14	6	3	5	23	15	+8	21
6	Philippine Navy	14	7	0	7	21	24	−3	21
7	Green Archers United	14	3	1	10	20	42	−22	10
8	Mendiola United (Note: Mendiola United apparently had all matches awarded 0-3 losses.)	14	0	0	14	0	42	−42	0

Updated to match(es) played on 27 November 2010. Source: rsssf.com
Rules for classification: 1) Points; 2) Goal Difference; 3) Goals Scored
(C) Champions

== Division 2 ==
Pos	Team	Pld	W	D	L	GF	GA	GD	Pts	Qualification or relegation
1	Global (C, P)	14	13	1	0	56	6	+50	40	Promotion to the 2011 UFL Division 1
2	Manila Nomads	14	10	1	3	50	24	+26	31	
3	Mama Africa F.C.	14	7	5	2	41	18	+23	26	
4	United South F.C.	14	5	2	7	25	38	−13	17	
5	Sunken Garden United	14	5	2	7	26	42	−16	17	
6	Manila Lions	14	4	1	9	23	30	−7	13	
7	Manila All-Japan	14	2	2	10	23	49	−26	8	
8	Diliman	14	2	2	10	13	50	−37	8	

Updated to match(es) played on 27 November 2010. Source: rsssf.com
Rules for classification: 1) Points; 2) Goal Difference; 3) Goals Scored
(C) Champions; (P) Promoted
