= Miguel Tanton =

Filipino footballer

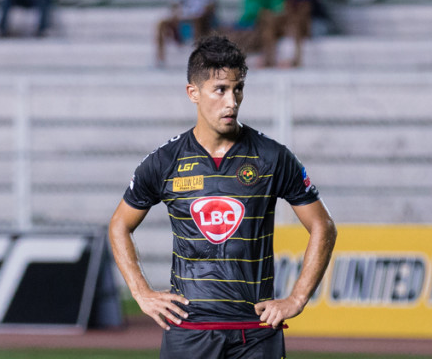
- Tanton playing for Kaya in 2016

Personal information
- Full name: Miguel Javier Tanton
- Date of birth: July 5, 1989 (age 37)
- Place of birth: Santa Clara, California, U.S.
- Height: 1.72 m (5 ft 8 in)
- Position: Midfielder

Youth career
- De Anza Santos
- Santa Clara Sporting
- C.F. Badalona

College career
Years	Team	Apps	(Gls)
2012	West Valley College		

Senior career*
Years	Team	Apps	(Gls)
2010–2012	UE Vilissar de Mar		
2013–2014	Mezcala		
2015–2018	Kaya–Iloilo	38	(4)
2019	Ceres–Negros	18	(1)

International career^{‡}
2016–2019	Philippines	2	(1)
- * Club domestic league appearances and goals as of 29 March 2019 (UTC) ‡ National team caps and goals as of 31 December 2018

Miguel Javier Tanton (born 5 July 1989) is a former footballer who plays as a midfielder. At the club level, he most recently played for Ceres–Negros in the Philippines Football League. Born in the United States, he represented the Philippines internationally.

== Early life ==
Tanton was born in Santa Clara, California in the United States on July 5, 1989. Tanton is Filipino American.

== International career ==
Tanton made a debut for the senior Philippine national football team on March 29, 2016, in a 2018 FIFA World Cup qualifiers match against North Korea. With OJ Porteria's suspension, Tanton was included as part of the starting eleven by head coach Thomas Dooley. He assisted Manuel Ott in making the second goal for the Philippines at the 84th minute. The match ended 3–2 in favor of the Philippines.

=== International goals ===
Scores and results list the Philippines' goal tally first.

No.	Date	Venue	Opponent	Score	Result	Competition
1.	31 December 2018	Grand Hamad Stadium, Doha, Qatar	Vietnam	2–2	2–4	Friendly

== Individual awards ==
- 2016 UFL Cup Best Midfielder
