= Kaya F.C.–Iloilo =

Filipino football club in Iloilo City

Kaya–Iloilo
- Full name: Kaya Futbol Club–Iloilo
- Nicknames: The Mighty Kaya; The Lions
- Short name: KAY
- Founded: 1996; 30 years ago
- Ground: Iloilo Sports Complex
- Capacity: 7,000
- Owner(s): Una Kaya Futbol Club, Inc.
- Chairman: Santi Araneta
- Head coach: Bobae Park
- League: Philippines Football League
- 2025–26: Philippines Football League, 3rd of 10
- Website: www.kayafc.com
| Home colours | Away colours | Third colours |

Kaya Futbol Club–Iloilo (Tagalog pronunciation: [ˈkaja futbol]), or simply Kaya–Iloilo, is a Filipino professional football club based in Iloilo City. They currently play in the Philippines Football League, the highest tier of football in the Philippines.

The club has won 3 league titles, 3 Copa Paulino Alcantara, and 1 United Football League Cup. Continentally, they have also competed in the AFC Champions League and the AFC Cup.

Founded in 1996 as Kaya Futbol Club in Makati, the club's name comes from the Filipino word káya ("we can"). While in Old Tagalog, the word is defined as susi ng kapatiran ("key to brotherhood"). Both of these definitions provide the basis for Kaya's team spirit and vision. The club was a founding member of the United Football League (UFL)—the de facto top-level league of Philippine football at the time. They played in the UFL throughout its existence from 2010 to 2016. In 2017, the club changed its name to Kaya–Makati upon joining the PFL, the official top flight of Philippine football. In 2018, they relocated to Iloilo City and changed their name accordingly.

== History ==
Kaya Futbol Club traces its origins to the late 1980s and early 1990s, when men played football in a wooden basketball court at the old Makati campus of the International School Manila (ISM) in present-day Century City, Makati. In July 1996, Kaya FC was established by Chris Hagedorn, ISM football coach Bob Kovach, and former national team players Rudy del Rosario, and John-Rey "Lupoy" Bela-ong. Chris Hagedorn once pointed out that the name "Kaya" is derived from the Filipino word for "can do it" or "we can". Kaya co-founder Rudy del Rosario points to the lyrics of Bob Marley's song Kaya, when asked about the origin of the club's name.

The club began to join outdoor 7-a-side football tournaments playing against other teams, frequently making podium-finishes in these competitions. In the late 1990s, Kaya participated in official and more challenging 11-a-side football tournaments organized by the National Capital Region Football Association. In the early 2000s, the club played in numerous competitions like the Globe Super Cup. In 2002, the club played in the first incarnation of the United Football League. In 2003, Kaya were crowned national champions after defeating Philippine Navy 2–1.

Between 2000 and 2009, Kaya defeated the Philippine Armed Forces clubs in two separate championship matches and was the champion of the old incarnation of the United Football League (UFL) on three occasions. The club was eventually recognized as one of the only club teams capable of defeating the "big three", composed of the Philippine Army, Philippine Air Force and Philippine Navy football clubs. Before the club participated in the inaugural UFL Cup in 2009, the CEO of LBC Express Santiago Araneta began investing on the club, helping Kaya to become one of the finest clubs in the Philippines.

=== United Football League (2010–2016) ===
==== 2010 season ====
After placing in the top two of their group in the first ever UFL Cup in October 2009, Kaya was placed in the first division for the inaugural United Football League competition. In the inaugural season of the United Football League, Kaya finished second, behind league champions Philippine Air Force. The club had a final record of 28 points (9 wins, 1 draw, and 4 losses in 14 games). The runner-up finish is Kaya's best finish in the league, which was replicated by the team in the 2012 season.

==== 2011 season ====
Kaya withdrew from this season's UFL Cup because almost all of the team's players, including Spanish coach Juan Cutillas, left to join a newly formed team. As a result, the club was fined ₱200,000 The club then hired Rudy del Rosario. The club went on to finish fourth after collecting 17 points (5 wins, 2 draws, and 5 losses in 12 games).

==== 2012 season ====
The previous UFL Cup saw the beginning of the fierce rivalry between Kaya and the Loyola Meralco Sparks. After placing top of their group with an unbeaten record, Kaya defeated Team Socceroo 2–0 in the round of sixteen. Kaya then defeated the Manila Nomads 3–0 in the quarterfinals, setting up a showdown with the Loyola Meralco Sparks in the semi-finals. Kaya lead the game 3–0, but a resilient Loyola Meralco Sparks managed to make an exciting comeback, finishing the game at 4–5 to the Sparks. With the loss, Kaya was placed in a third-place match with Global, losing 2–1. The 2012 league competition saw one of Kaya's best finishes to date, finishing runners-up to champions Global. The two clubs finished with the same record (42 points with 13 wins, 3 draws, and 2 losses in 18 games). The championship was decided on goal-difference, with Global having a +32. With the runners-up finish, Kaya missed out on qualifying for the 2013 AFC President's Cup.

==== 2013 season ====
Kaya joined its first PFF National Men's Club Championship. In the round of sixteen, they defeated M'lang 5–0 in Koronadal. The club beat rivals Loyola Meralco Sparks 1–0 in the quarterfinals, before falling to eventual champions Ceres 3–1 in the semi-finals. In the third-place match, Kaya defeated Green Archers United 2–0. In the UFL Cup, Kaya finished the group stages in second place, behind Green Archers United on goal difference. They were defeated by Global 2–1 at extra time in the quarterfinals. Head coach Michael Alvarez stepped down in December and was replaced by Uruguayan Maor Rozen. Kaya finished fourth in the league competition with 31 points (8 wins, 7 draws, and 3 losses in 18 games), 15 points from champions Stallion. Maor Rozen resigned after just three matches in charge. The club's goalkeeping coach Melo Sabacan took over the reins as interim head coach, and was subsequently replaced by Australian coach David Perković.

==== 2014 season ====
The club saw minimal success in the UFL Cup. Kaya finished second in their group, behind UFL Division 2 side Union Internacional Manila. They then lost to recently relegated Philippine Air Force 1–0 in the round of sixteen. The league competition saw Kaya finish third with 46 points (14 wins, 4 draws, and 6 losses in 24 games), 3 points behind rivals Loyola Meralco Sparks and 16 points behind league champions Global. Before the season ended, head coach David Perković announced that he will not be renewing his contract. In the UFL FA Cup, the culmination competition of the season, Kaya were beaten 3–1 by Global in the final. Thomas Taylor was the competition's top goal-scorer with five goals.

==== 2015 season ====
In the pre-season, it was announced by the club that American Adam Reekie will replace David Perković as the club's new head coach. Kaya failed to get past the group stages of the PFF National Men's Club Championship, but were able to top their group in the inaugural UFL FA League Cup. The club fell to rivals Loyola Meralco Sparks 2–1 in the quarterfinals. Louis Max Clark was named as one of the competition's top goal-scorers with 10 goals in 7 games. The club finished fourth in the league with 31 points (10 wins, 1 draw, 6 losses in 17 games), 12 points behind champions Ceres. In the middle of the league competition, head coach Adam Reekie announced his resignation. In June 2015, former Kaya player Fabien Lewis was appointed by the club as interim head coach.

With the eventual departure of Fabien Lewis, Kaya player Chris Greatwich became the club's interim head coach during the UFL Cup. Kaya finished the group stage at the top of the table. The club defeated l Manila Nomads 10–1 in the round of sixteen, then defeated JP Voltes 8–0 in the quarterfinals. In their semi-final clash against Stallion, Kaya came from behind three times to put the game at 3–3 at extra time. Kaya won the game 5–4 in penalties after goalkeeper Nick O'Donnell denied Ian Araneta, bringing Kaya to its first UFL Cup final appearance. The game again went to penalties after the game finished at 2–2 at extra time. Nick O'Donnel denied Ceres twice and Louis Clark slotted in the winning penalty to give Kaya a 4–2 win.

==== 2016 season ====
Kaya officially celebrated their 20th founding anniversary this season. During pre-season, it was announced that Kaya academy director and former Philippine Azkal Chris Greatwich has been appointed as the new head coach. On 23 February 2016, Kaya played their maiden AFC Cup game against Hong Kong Premier League side Kitchee, where they lost 1–0. On 8 March, Kaya earned their first three points in an international competition with a 1–0 win against the Maldives' New Radiant. A week after, Kaya defeated S.League side Balestier Khalsa 1–0 at home. On 12 April, Kaya once again defeated Balestier Khalsa, 3–0 away. The result marks the club's first points earned away from home in an international competition.

=== Philippines Football League (2017–present) ===

The lineup for Kaya during the inaugural Copa Paulino Alcantara final against Davao Aguilas.

==== New league and new home ====
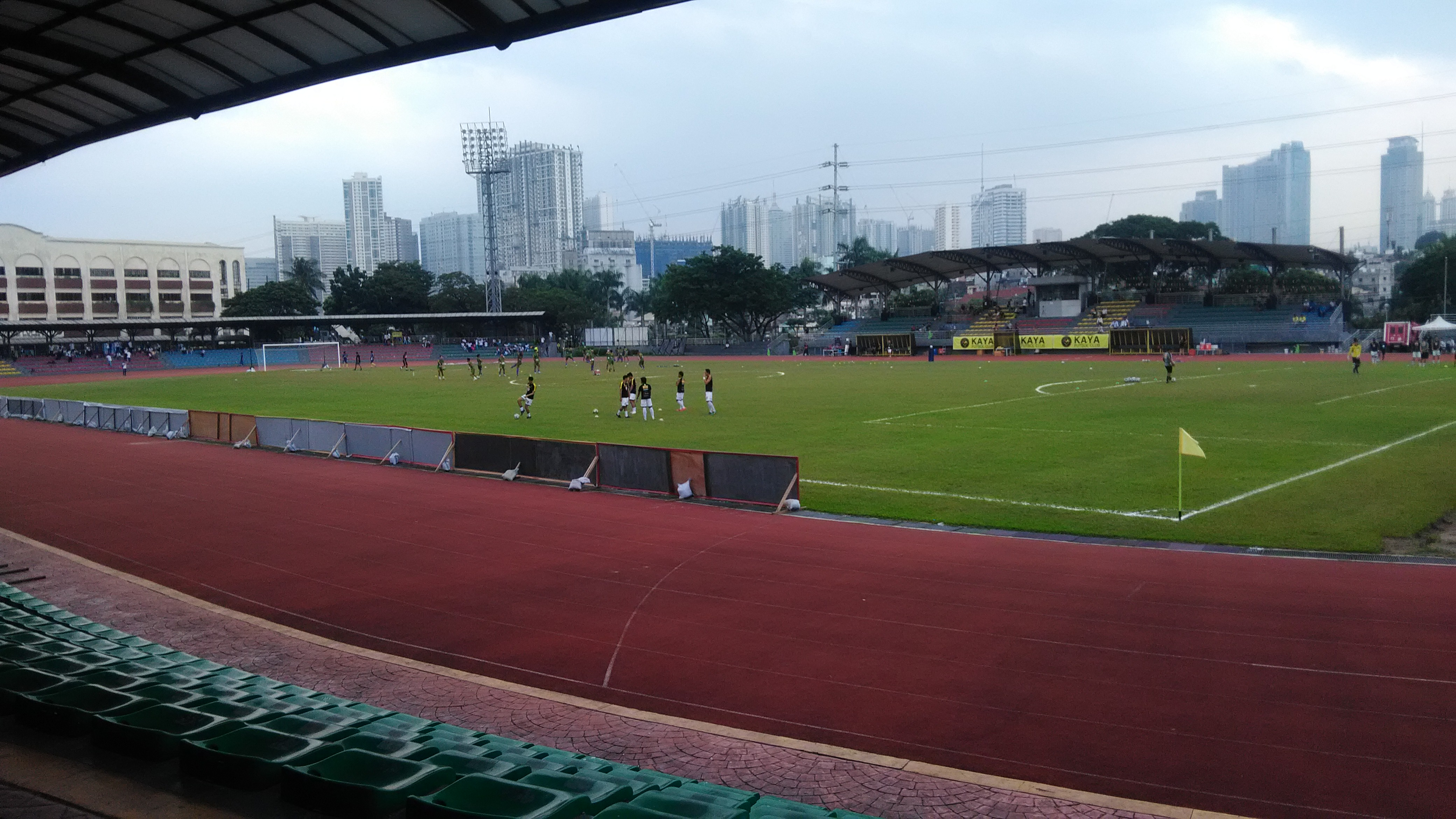
The University of Makati Stadium was the home ground of Kaya during the inaugural Philippines Football League season in 2017.

In November 2016, after the Philippines Football League (PFL) was established as the country's new top-tier league, Kaya confirmed their participation in the inaugural season. Kaya adopted the name Kaya–Makati and used the University of Makati Stadium, with a seating capacity of 4,000, as their home ground. For the inaugural season, Kaya finished third in the regular season and lost to Ceres-Negros in the semi-final of the Finals series. In January 2018, it was reported that Kaya planned to move its home venue to the Iloilo Sports Complex in La Paz, Iloilo City. On 6 February 2018, Kaya transferred from Makati to Iloilo with the signing of a memorandum of agreement between club officials and the provincial government of Iloilo. The team changed their name to Kaya–Iloilo.

Kaya secured a return to Asian club football after it won over Davao Aguilas in the final of the 2018 Copa Paulino Alcantara and qualified for the 2019 AFC Cup. In the 2020 season, Kaya finished undefeated in the shortened season with 3 wins and 2 draws. In their final league match, they ended the two-year unbeaten run of rivals United City (formerly Ceres). In 2021, club won their second Copa Paulino Alcantara. In the 2022–23 season, Kaya won their first-ever league title.

==== AFC Champions League debut ====
On 23 June 2021, Kaya defeated Chinese side Shanghai Port 1–0 in the 2021 AFC Champions League play-off round where Audie Menzi scored to send Kaya to the AFC Champions League group stage for the first time. They were placed in the group F with Korean giants Ulsan Hyundai, Thai champions BG Pathum United and Vietnamese champions Viettel. Despite ending winless, Marwin Angeles became the first player from a Filipino club to score in the AFC Champions League. On 20 June 2024, AFC confirmed that Kaya will participate in the inaugural 2024–25 AFC Champions League Two tournament, and also in the revived 2024–25 ASEAN Club Championship. Kaya were then drawn in a group alongside Vietnamese Công An Hà Nội, Singaporean Lion City Sailors, Malaysian Kuala Lumpur City, Thai Buriram United and Indonesian Borneo Samarinda. On 28 November 2024, during an AFC Champions League Two match, Kaya made history after drawing 1–1 at home against the J1 League club Sanfrecce Hiroshima, ending the Japanese club's four game winning streak in the group stage. Shuto Komaki scored in the 18th minute for the team.

== Team image ==
=== Crest and colors ===
Crest from 1996 until 2017

Crest as Kaya–Makati in 2017

The colors of Kaya's crest (red, green, yellow and black) are mainly based on the pan-African colors that are associated with Rastafari. This is due to the heavy influence of Reggae on the club's founding members' lives. The 31 stars on the crest is a tribute to club co-founder John-Rey "Lupoy" Bela-ong, with each star signifying every year of his life. Bela-ong died at the age of 31 in 2002, when he was stabbed to death while exiting a bus in Quezon City. At that time, he was carrying the material for Kaya's team uniforms, which were then stolen by his killers.

In 2017, Kaya launched their new logos, with the only major changes being the words "Makati City" instead of the club's founding year put on the bottom of the crest. The team's founding year, 1996, has instead been put inside the ball of the crest, also at the bottom. When the club transferred to Iloilo City, the logo had a minor revision with the text "Makati City" changed to "Iloilo", the new home province of the club.

=== Supporters ===
The Ultras Kaya, also known as the Sons of Mighty Kaya, was the official supporters group of Kaya and were the pioneers of ultras culture in the Philippine football scene. The group was established in 2011 when one of the Futsaldiers teamed up with two members of the Kaholeros. The Ultras Kaya make their presence in the upper-left side of the Rizal Memorial Stadium's grandstand, in the section referred to as "The Terraces". After years of inactivity, The Sons of Mighty Kaya announced that they will be active again for the 2024 season. The capos of SOMK have vowed to "rectify their errors and rebuild the Ultras Kaya".

=== Rivalries ===
When Kaya was still based in Manila, they had rivalries with a number of clubs in the UFL. In 2010, they had a fierce rivalry with Union Internacional Manila, but since the club decided to be voluntarily relegated to the UFL Division 2, this rivalry has mostly died out. Since 2011, Kaya held a rivalry with National Capital Region neighbors Loyola Meralco Sparks, with Kaya hailing from the city of Makati in the south of Metro Manila and Loyola Meralco Sparks being based in Quezon City in the north. The rivalry began in the 2011 UFL Cup semi-final, in which Kaya went up to lead the game by 3–0, only to lose by 5–4. Since then, the UFL has had some of its highest attendance numbers whenever there are match-ups between the two teams, making the rivalry the most famous derby in Philippine club football.

This rivalry continued into the first season of the newly founded Philippines Football League. However, after the first season of the PFL concluded, Meralco withdrew from the league. A new rivalry emerged with Ceres–Negros, up until the latter withdrew in the middle of the 2022–23 season due to "investor issues". The rivalry was created after the two clubs established themselves as the early powerhouses of the league.

== Kit suppliers and shirt sponsors ==
| Period | Kit Manufacturer | Shirt partner |
|---|---|---|
| 2010–11 | (Philippines) Rudy Project | Cignal |
| 2011–2013 | (Japan) Mizuno | LBC Express^{1} Belo Medical Group, Delimondo^{2} |
| 2013–2019 | (Philippines) LGR Athletics | LBC Express, Yellow Cab ^{1} Belo Medical Group, Gatorade, Tokyo-Tokyo^{2} |
| 2019–2020 | (Germany) Adidas | LBC Express, Fitness First |
| 2021–present | (Philippines) LGR Athletics | LBC Express^{1} |
| 2021–present | (Philippines) LGR Athletics | Peak Form, Bootcamp, Fitogether^{2} |

- ^{1} Major sponsor
- ^{2} Secondary sponsor

== Stadium ==
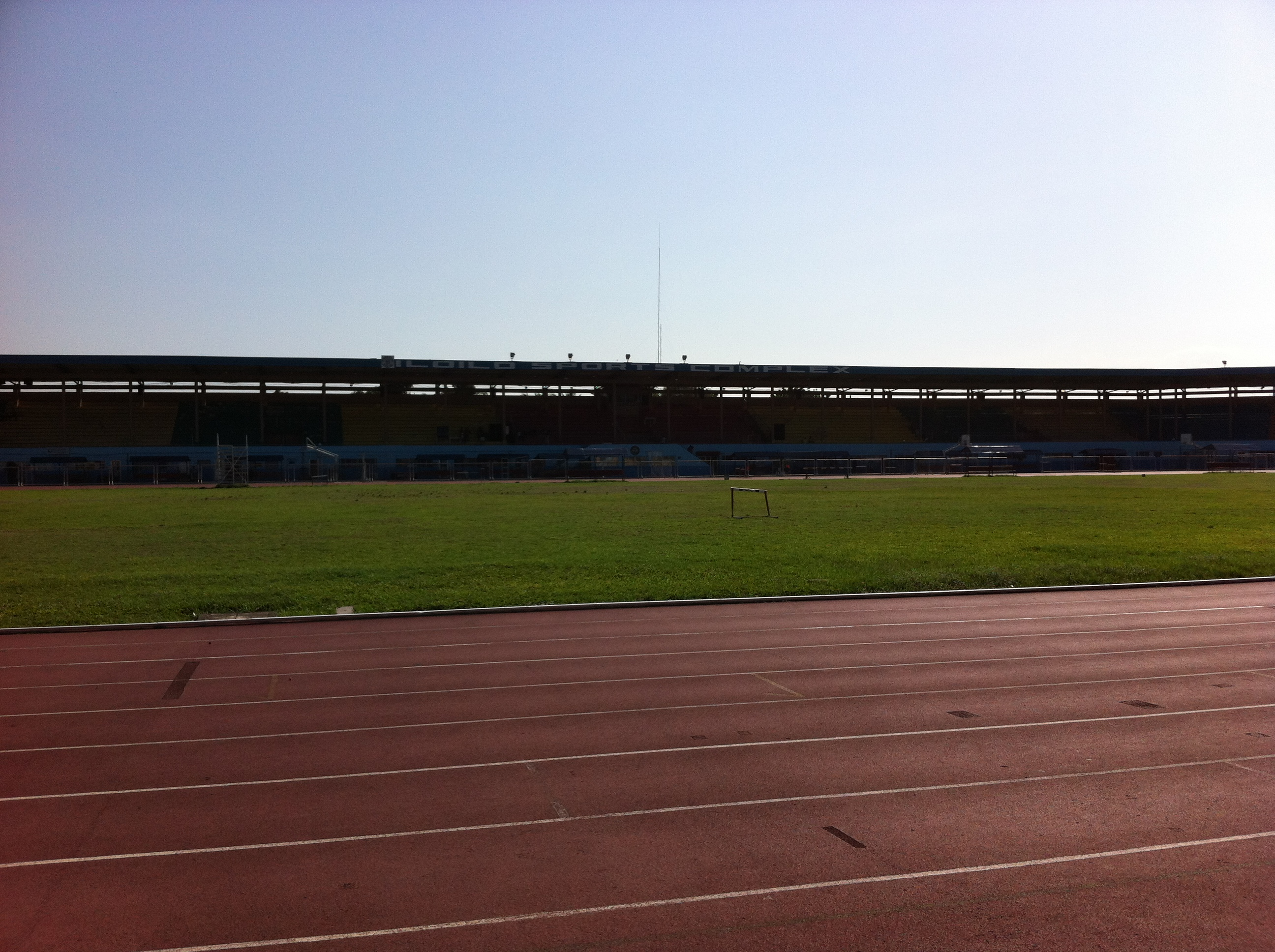
Kaya moved its home venue to the Iloilo Sports Complex in 2018.

The football stadium of the Iloilo Sports Complex in Iloilo City is Kayas designated home venue for the Philippines Football League since 2018. By 2022, the club has been considering the Campo Alcantara Football Stadium in Pavia in Iloilo province. The stadium was under construction as early as 2020.

When the club was briefly known as the Kaya–Makati, it played its home matches at the football stadium of the University of Makati in what was then part of the city of Makati for the inaugural 2017 PFL season.

== Players ==
As of 12 September 2026

Note: Flags indicate national team as defined under FIFA eligibility rules; some limited exceptions apply. Players may hold more than one non-FIFA nationality.

| No. | Pos. | Nation | Player |
|---|---|---|---|
| 4 | DF | PHI | Gabriel Guimarães |
| 5 | MF | PHI | Mike Ott |
| 6 | MF | PHI | Antoine Ortega |
| 8 | MF | PHI | Justin Peña |
| 9 | FW | BRA | Ricardo Verza |
| 10 | FW | PHI | Jesus Melliza (captain) |
| 12 | DF | PHI | Mar Diano |
| 14 | DF | PHI | Jaime Rosquillo |
| 15 | DF | PHI | Marco Casambre (co-captain) |
| 16 | GK | PHI | Lance Bencio |
| 19 | MF | ITA | Sebastian Avanzini |
| 20 | FW | PHI | Chris Valderrama |

| No. | Pos. | Nation | Player |
|---|---|---|---|
| 21 | FW | KOR | Na Seung-eun |
| 22 | DF | PHI | Fitch Arboleda |
| 25 | MF | GHA | Eric Esso (co-captain) |
| 31 | GK | GHA | Iddrisu Natogma |
| 35 | DF | PHI | Emanuel Enriquez |
| 40 | GK | PHI | Patrick Deyto |
| 44 | DF | PHI | Audie Menzi (co-captain) |
| 70 | DF | KOR | Kim Sung-jin |
| 77 | FW | PHI | Martini Rey |
| 79 | MF | JPN | Kentaro Fujikawa |
| 92 | MF | PHI | Marc Alipoon |

== Management and staff ==
| Position | Name |
|---|---|
| Head coach | (South Korea) Bobae Park |
| Assistant coach | (Philippines) Oliver Colina |
| Goalkeeping coach | (Philippines) Hayeson Pepito |
| Physiotherapist | (Philippines) Joshua Castelo (Philippines) Eunice Maliuanag |
| Kitman | (Philippines) Ching Bautista |

=== Management ===
| Position | Name |
|---|---|
| Chairman | (Philippines) Santi Araneta |
| President | (Philippines) Paul Tolentino |
| Team manager | (Philippines) Camelo Tacusalme |

== Managerial history ==
| Coach | Years in charge |
|---|---|
| (United States) Robert Kovach | 1996–2002 |
| (Spain) Juan Cutillas | 2011–2012 |
| (Philippines) Michael Alvarez | 2012 |
| (Uruguay) Maor Rozen | 2012–2013 |
| (Philippines) Melo Sabacan | 2013 |
| (Australia) David Perković | 2013–2014 |
| (United States) Adam Reekie | 2014–2015 |
| (Trinidad and Tobago) Fabien Larry Lewis | 2015 |
| (Philippines) Chris Greatwich | 2015–2017 |
| (Philippines) Joel Villarino (Note: Villarino served as head coach of Kaya during the 2016 AFC Cup, where it is required that the head coach of a club to have a "A" license. Chris Greatwich, the club's regular head coach has no such credentials by the time of the competition.) | 2016 (AFC Cup) |
| (Philippines) Noel Marcaida | 2017–2019 |
| (Philippines) Oliver Colina | 2020 |
| (Japan) Yu Hoshide | 2020–2023 |
| (England) Graham Harvey | 2021 (AFC Champions League) |
| (Northern Ireland) Colum Curtis | 2023 |
| (Japan) Yu Hoshide (2) | 2024–2026 |
| (South Korea) Bobae Park | 2026–present |

== Honors ==
=== League ===
- Philippines Football League
  - Winners: 2022–23, 2024, 2024–25
  - Runners-up: 2018, 2019, 2020
- United Football League Division 1
  - Runners-up: 2010, 2012

=== Cups ===
- Copa Paulino Alcantara
  - Winners: 2018, 2021, 2023
  - Runners-up: 2019, 2022
- Philippines National Championship
  - Winners: 2003
- UFL Cup
  - Winners: 2015
- UFL FA Cup
  - Runners-up: 2014

== Notable players ==
As of 2026–27 season.

=== International capped players ===
| AFC/OFC.: –NIL– | CAF.: (Ghana) Emmanuel Carlos Osei | UEFA.: –NIL– | CONMEBOL/ CONCACAF.: (Trinidad and Tobago) Carlyle Mitchell; (Trinidad and Tobago) Darryl Roberts |

== Season by season record ==
| Season | Division | Teams | League position | PFL Cup | PFF NMCC | UFL Cup | FA Cup | League Cup | ACL Two | ACL Elite | ACC |
|---|---|---|---|---|---|---|---|---|---|---|---|
| 2009 | — | — | — | — | — | Semi-final | — | — | — | — | — |
| 2010 | 1 | 8 | 2nd | — | — | Withdrew | — | — | — | — | — |
| 2011 | 1 | 7 | 4th | — | — | 4th | — | — | — | — | — |
| 2012 | 1 | 10 | 2nd | — | — | Quarter-final | — | — | — | — | — |
| 2013 | 1 | 10 | 4th | — | 3rd | Round of 16 | — | — | — | — | — |
| 2014 | 1 | 9 | 3rd | — | — | — | 2nd | Quarter-final | — | — | — |
| 2015 | 1 | 10 | 4th | — | Group stage | 1st | — | — | — | — | — |
| 2016 | 1 | 12 | 5th | — | — | 3rd | — | — | Round of 16 | — | — |
| 2017 | 1 | 8 | 3rd (Regular Season) | — | — | — | — | — | — | — | — |
| 2017 | 1 | 8 | 4th (Finals Series) | — | — | — | — | — | — | — | — |
| 2018 | 1 | 6 | 2nd | 1st | — | — | — | — | — | — | — |
| 2019 | 1 | 7 | 2nd | 2nd | — | — | — | — | Group stage | — | — |
| 2020 | 1 | 6 | 2nd | Canceled | — | — | — | — | Group stage (Canceled) | — | — |
| 2021 | 1 | 7 | Canceled | 1st | — | — | — | — | — | Group stage | — |
| 2022 | — | — | — | 2nd | — | — | — | — | Group stage | Preliminary round | — |
| 2022–23 | 1 | 5 | 1st | 1st | — | — | — | — | — | — | — |
| 2024 | 1 | 15 | 1st | — | — | — | — | — | — | Group stage | — |
| 2024–25 | 1 | 10 | 1st (League) | — | — | — | — | — | Group stage | — | Group stage |
| 2024–25 | 1 | 10 | Semi-final (Finals Series) | — | — | — | — | — | Group stage | — | Group stage |
| 2025–26 | 1 | 11 | 3rd | — | — | — | — | — | Group stage | — | — |

== Continental record ==
As of 11 December 2025

All results (away, home and aggregate) list Kaya–Iloilo's goal tally first.

| Competition | Q | Pld | W | D | L | GF | GA | GD | W % |
|---|---|---|---|---|---|---|---|---|---|
| AFC Champions League / AFC Champions League Elite | 3 | 14 | 1 | 0 | 13 | 7 | 42 | −35 | 7.14 |
| AFC Cup / AFC Champions League Two | 6 | 31 | 7 | 6 | 18 | 35 | 53 | −18 | 22.58 |
| Total | 9 | 45 | 8 | 6 | 31 | 42 | 95 | −53 | 17.78 |

| Season | Competition | Round | Club | Score | | Agg. / Pos. |
| Season | Competition | Round | Club | Home | Away | Agg. / Pos. |
|---|---|---|---|---|---|---|
| 2016 | AFC Cup | Group stage | (Hong Kong) Kitchee | 0–1 | 0–1 | Group F (2nd) |
| 2016 | AFC Cup | Group stage | (Maldives) New Radiant | 1–0 | 0–0 | Group F (2nd) |
| 2016 | AFC Cup | Group stage | (Singapore) Balestier Khalsa | 1–0 | 3–0 | Group F (2nd) |
| 2016 | AFC Cup | Round of 16 | (Malaysia) Johor Darul Ta'zim | 2–7 | | — |
| 2019 | AFC Cup | Group stage | (Laos) Lao Toyota | 5–1 | 1–1 | Group H (3rd) |
| 2019 | AFC Cup | Group stage | (Singapore) Home United | 5–0 | 0–2 | Group H (3rd) |
| 2019 | AFC Cup | Group stage | (Indonesia) PSM Makassar | 1–2 | 1–1 | Group H (3rd) |
| 2020 | AFC Cup | Group stage | (Myanmar) Shan United | Canceled | 2–0 | Group H (2nd) |
| 2020 | AFC Cup | Group stage | (Singapore) Tampines Rovers | 0–0 | Canceled | Group H (2nd) |
| 2020 | AFC Cup | Group stage | (Indonesia) PSM Makassar | Canceled | 1–1 | Group H (2nd) |
| 2021 | AFC Champions League | Preliminary round | (Australia) Brisbane Roar | Canceled | | — |
| 2021 | AFC Champions League | Play-off round | (China) Shanghai Port | 1–0 | | — |
| 2021 | AFC Champions League | Group stage | (Thailand) BG Pathum United | 0–1 | 1–4 | Group F (4th) |
| 2021 | AFC Champions League | Group stage | (Vietnam) Viettel | 0–5 | 0–1 | Group F (4th) |
| 2021 | AFC Champions League | Group stage | (South Korea) Ulsan Hyundai | 0–3 | 1–2 | Group F (4th) |
| 2022 | AFC Champions League | Preliminary round | (Australia) Sydney | 0–5 | | — |
| 2022 | AFC Cup | Group stage | (Cambodia) Visakha | 1–2 | | Group G (4th) |
| 2022 | AFC Cup | Group stage | (Malaysia) Kedah Darul Aman | 1–4 | | Group G (4th) |
| 2022 | AFC Cup | Group stage | (Indonesia) Bali United | 0–1 | | Group G (4th) |
| 2023–24 | AFC Champions League | Group stage | (China) Shandong Taishan | 1–3 | 1–6 | Group G (4th) |
| 2023–24 | AFC Champions League | Group stage | (South Korea) Incheon United | 1–3 | 0–4 | Group G (4th) |
| 2023–24 | AFC Champions League | Group stage | (Japan) Yokohama F. Marinos | 1–2 | 0–3 | Group G (4th) |
| 2024–25 | AFC Champions League Two | Group stage | (Japan) Sanfrecce Hiroshima | 1–1 | 0–3 | Group E (3rd) |
| 2024–25 | AFC Champions League Two | Group stage | (Australia) Sydney | 1–4 | 1–3 | Group E (3rd) |
| 2024–25 | AFC Champions League Two | Group stage | (Hong Kong) Eastern | 1–2 | 2–1 | Group E (3rd) |
| 2025–26 | AFC Champions League Two | Group stage | (South Korea) Pohang Steelers | 0–1 | 0–2 | Group H (4th) |
| 2025–26 | AFC Champions League Two | Group stage | (Thailand) BG Pathum United | 0–2 | 1–2 | Group H (4th) |
| 2025–26 | AFC Champions League Two | Group stage | (Singapore) Tampines Rovers | 0–3 | 3–5 | Group H (4th) |

AFC club ranking

As of 31 August 2025.

| Current Rank | Country | Team |
|---|---|---|
| 404 | (India) | Hindustan Aero |
| 405 | (Qatar) | Muaither |
| 406 | (Philippines) | Kaya–Iloilo |

== Performance in AFC competitions ==
- AFC Champions League/AFC Champions League Elite: 3 appearances

2021: Group stage
2022: Preliminary round
2023–24: Group stage

- AFC Cup/AFC Champions League Two: 5 appearances

2016: Round of 16
2019: Group stage
2020: Canceled
2022: Group stage
2024–25: Group stage

== Kaya F.C. Women ==
The Kaya F.C. women's team was founded in 2019. The seven-a-side team competed in the inaugural season of the 7's Football League Women's Division, where they finished runners-up.
