= Tourette Canada =

Canadian voluntary organization

Tourette Canada (formerly Tourette Syndrome Foundation of Canada) is a Canadian voluntary organization based in Mississauga, Ontario. It was formed in 1976, and is dedicated to improving the quality of life for those with or affected by Tourette syndrome through programs of education, advocacy, self-help and support. It has affiliates in eight Canadian provinces.

Tourette Canada is notable for its publications, including an educator's handbook and the 2004 film Circle of Support, which had its premiere at the National Film Board of Canada and programming, including the Virtual Community for Tourette.
