= Ryuki Kozawa =

Japanese footballer

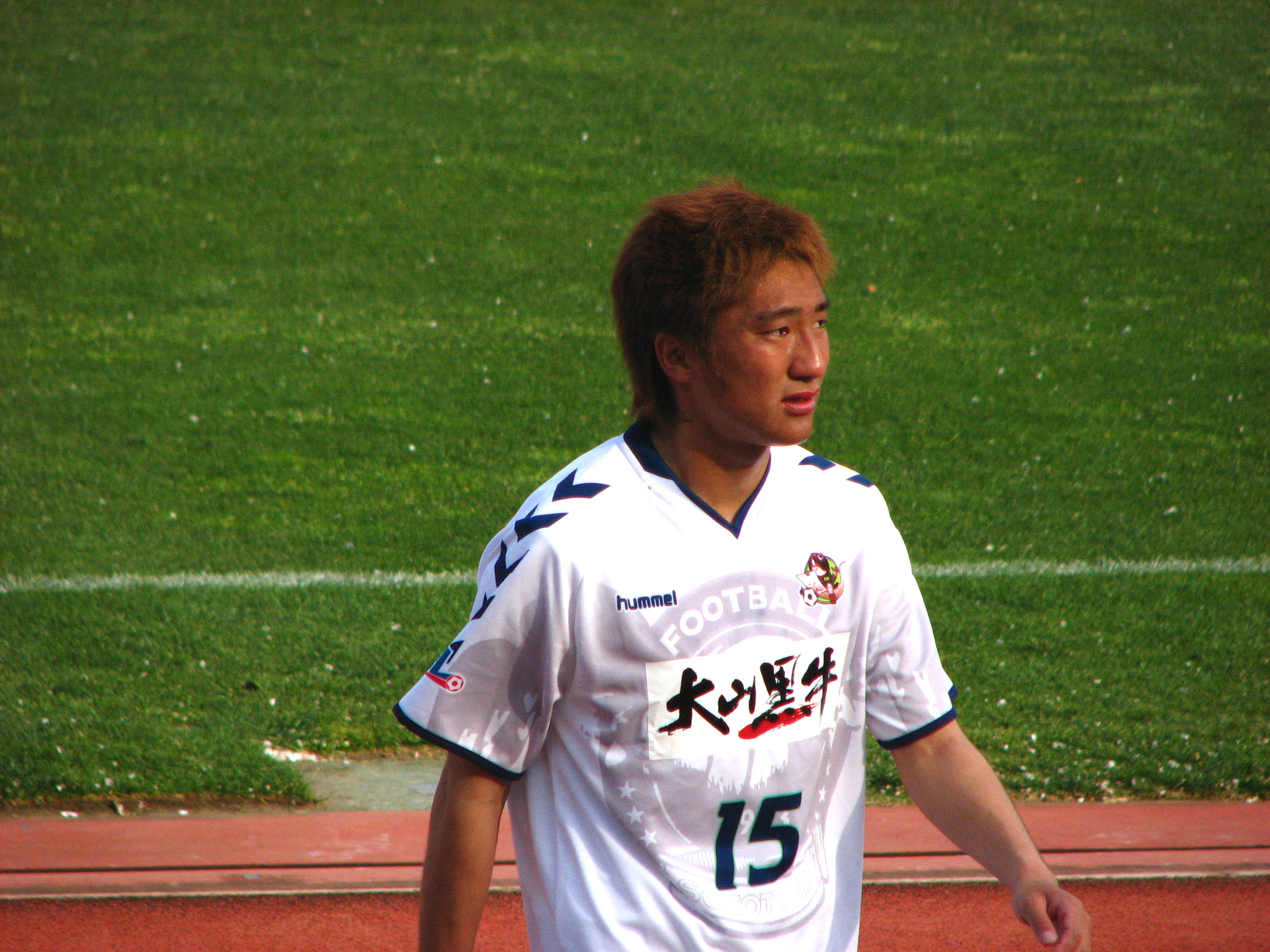

Personal information
- Full name: Ryuki Kozawa
- Date of birth: February 6, 1988 (age 38)
- Place of birth: Nagoya, Japan
- Height: 1.70 m (5 ft 7 in)
- Position: Forward

Senior career*
Years	Team	Apps	(Gls)
2006–2007	FC Tokyo	3	(0)
2008–2010	Gainare Tottori	56	(18)
2011	Blaublitz Akita	20	(2)
2012	Pattaya United		
2012	Gulbene	9	(0)
2013–2015	Gwardia Koszalin	65	(13)
2015	Drawa Drawsko Pomorskie	15	(4)
2016	Mumbai	14	(3)
2016–2017	Lampang		
2018–2019	JPV Marikina		
2019–2020	Ilanka Rzepin		
- * Club domestic league appearances and goals

Ryuki Kozawa (小澤 竜己, Kozawa Ryūki; born February 6, 1988) is a Japanese former professional footballer who played as a forward.

Kozawa played for FC Tokyo in the J1 League in 2006–2007, and Pattaya United in the Thai Premier League between 2008 and 2010.

== Club statistics ==
Club performance			League		Cup		League Cup		Total	
Season	Club	League	Apps	Goals	Apps	Goals	Apps	Goals	Apps	Goals
Japan			League		Emperor's Cup		J.League Cup		Total	
2006	FC Tokyo	J1 League	3	0	0	0	3	0	6	0
2007	FC Tokyo	J1 League	0	0	0	0	0	0	0	0
2008	Gainare Tottori	Football League	29	11	1	0	-		30	11
2009	Gainare Tottori	Football League	19	6	0	0	-		19	6
2010	Gainare Tottori	Football League								
Country	Japan		51	17	1	0	3	0	55	17
Total			51	17	1	0	3	0	55	17
2012	FB Gulbene	Latvian Higher League	9	0	0	0	0	0	0	0
