= Tokyo Tokyo =

Restaurant chain in the Philippines

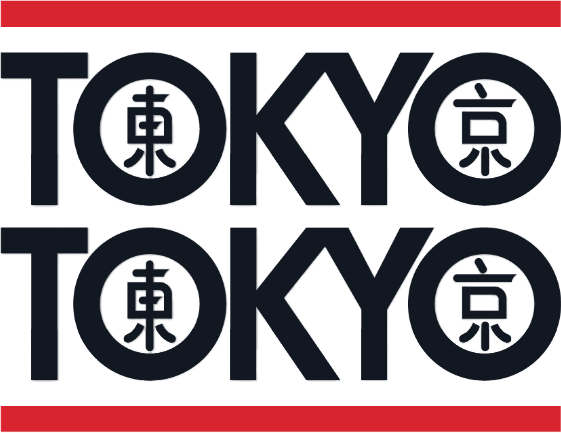
- Company type: Corporation
- Industry: Restaurants
- Founded: April 7, 1985; 41 years ago, Philippines
- Headquarters: 80-82 RCC Building, Brgy. Obrero, Diliman, Quezon City, Philippines
- Number of locations: >80
- Products: Fast food
- Website: https://www.tokyotokyodelivery.ph/

Tokyo Tokyo (東京 東京) (Romanization: Tōkyō Tōkyō) is a Filipino restaurant chain specializing in Japanese cuisine.

== History ==
The first Tokyo Tokyo restaurant opened on April 22, 1985 at the Quad Carpark (later Park Square 1) in Makati and at the time was the first Japanese fast-food restaurant to serve unlimited rice with its dishes. The chain initially served Japanese dishes such as tempura, tonkatsu, yakisoba, sushi and sashimi. When it opened its first restaurants in 1985, other Japanese restaurants were more traditional; the 'mainstreaming' of the chain's market contributed to the restaurant chain's growth.

By the end of 2013, Tokyo Tokyo had 50 locations nationwide.

As of 2018, Tokyo Tokyo is owned by Hansbury Inc., under the One Food Group, which also owns the Philippine franchise for KFC and Mister Donut.

== Products ==
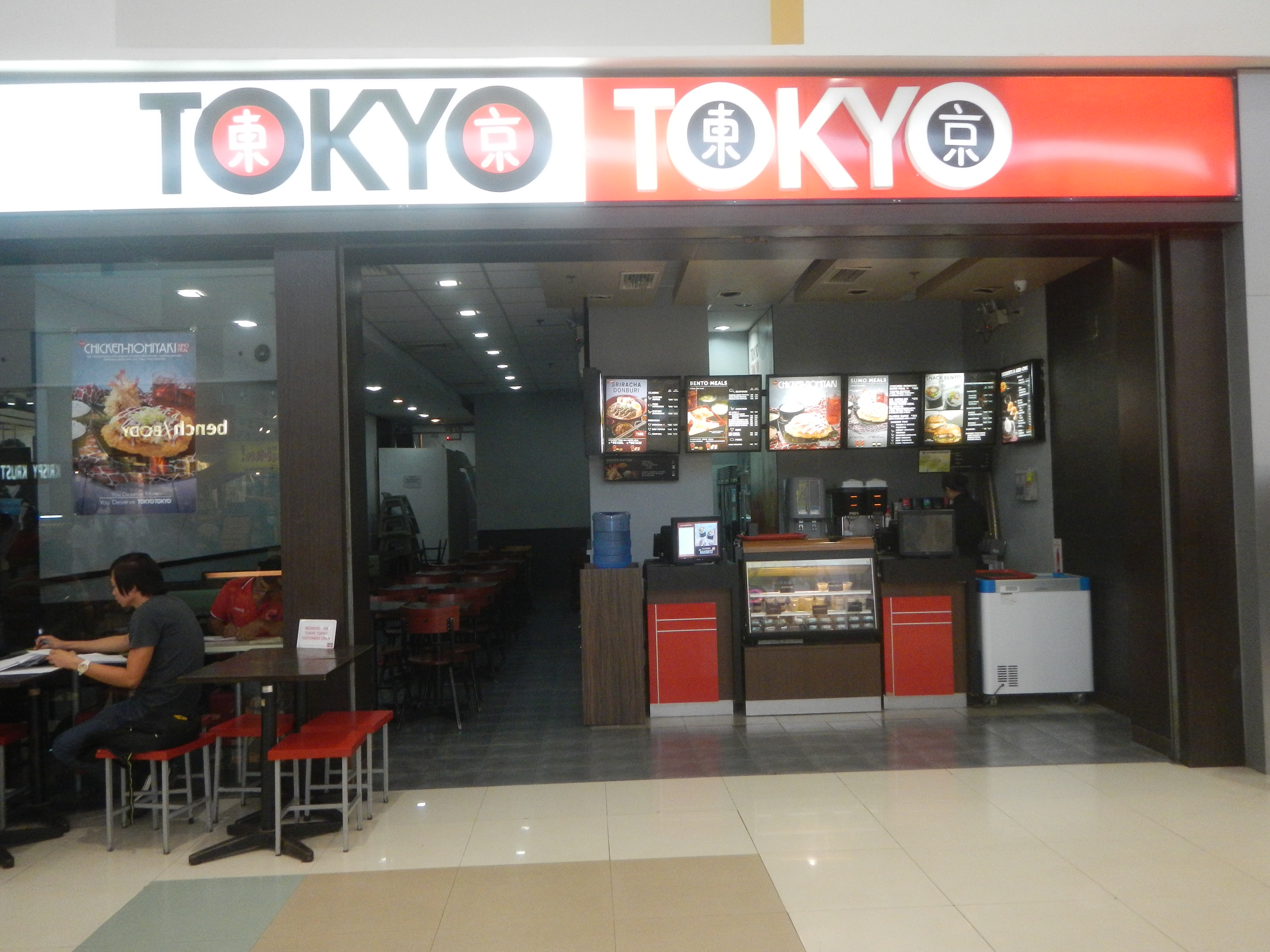
A Tokyo Tokyo branch at SM City Baliwag, Baliwag, Bulacan

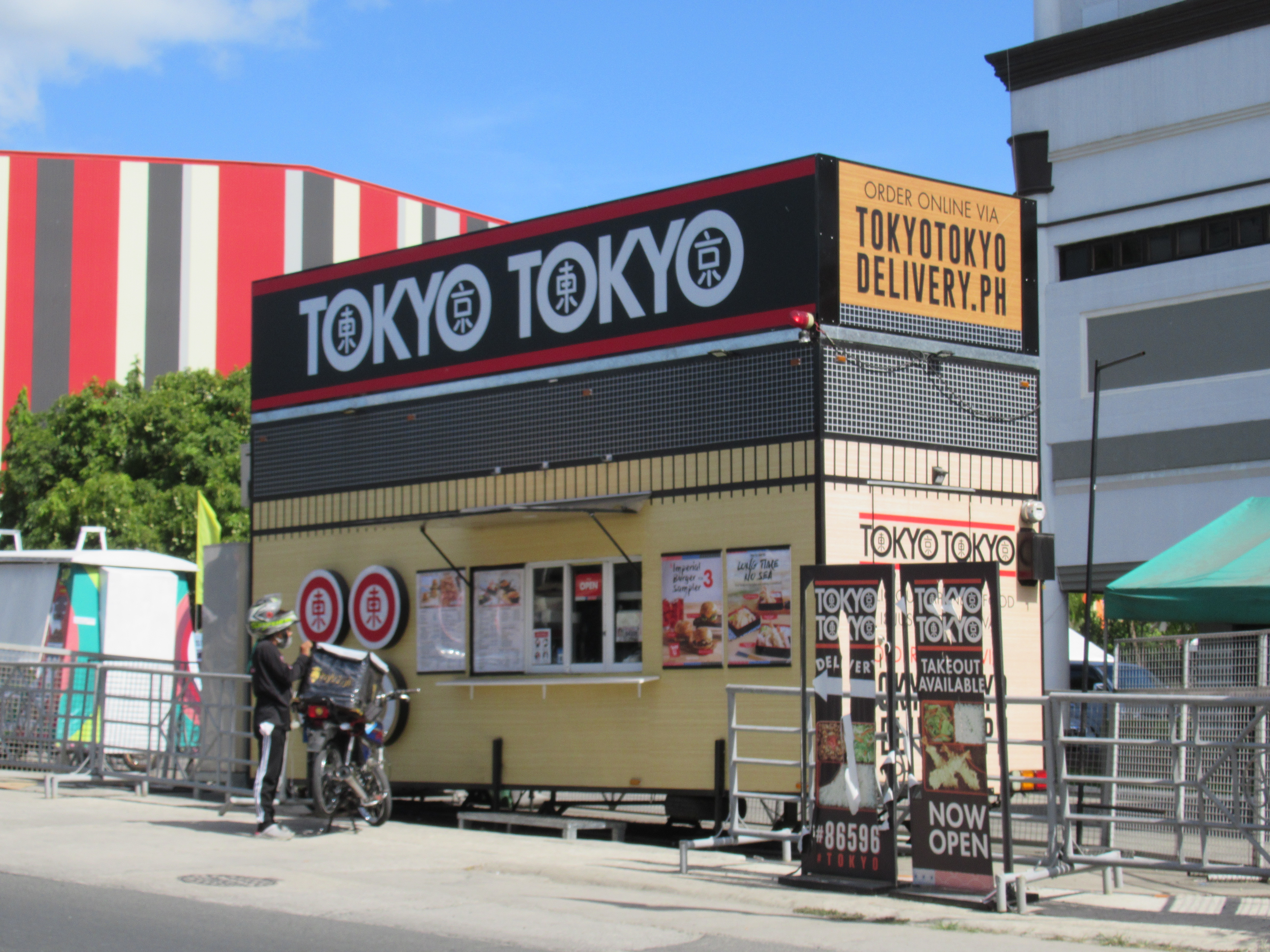
A Tokyo Tokyo pop-up store in San Jose del Monte

Tokyo Tokyo’s menu currently offers 3 types of sushi. The chicken teriyaki and tuna misono are the house specials of Tokyo Tokyo. Tokyo Tokyo also offers yakisoba, Japanese style potato balls, miso soup and kani crab corn soup as side dishes.

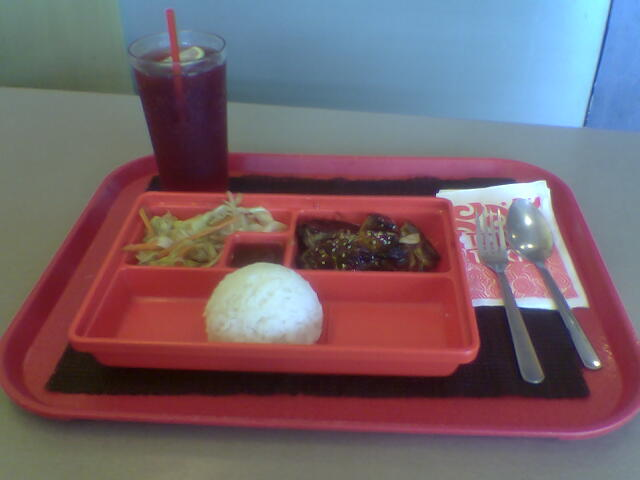
The Best Chicken Teriyaki (BCT), a specialty of the chain

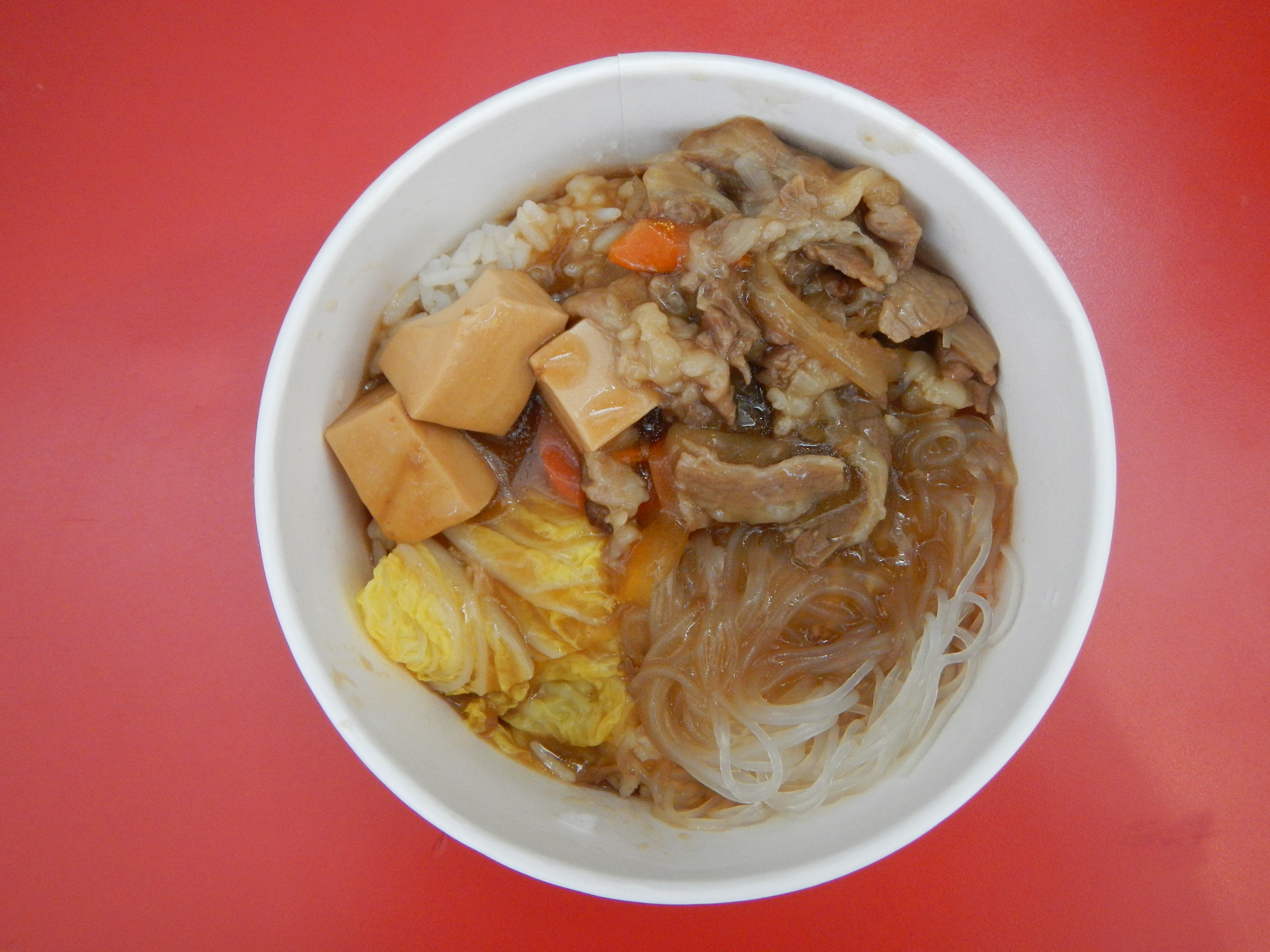
Beef Sukiyakidon

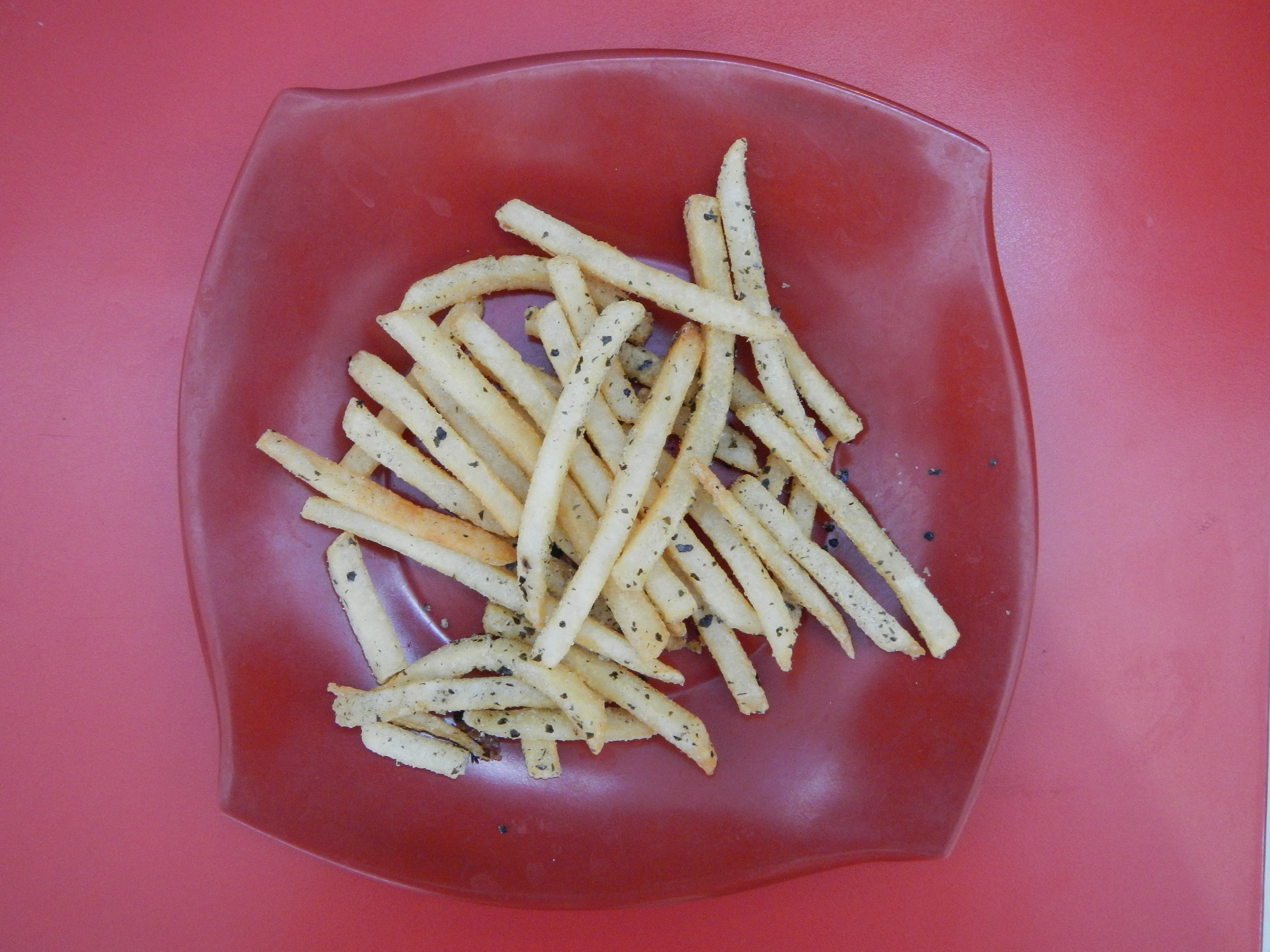
Wasabi fries

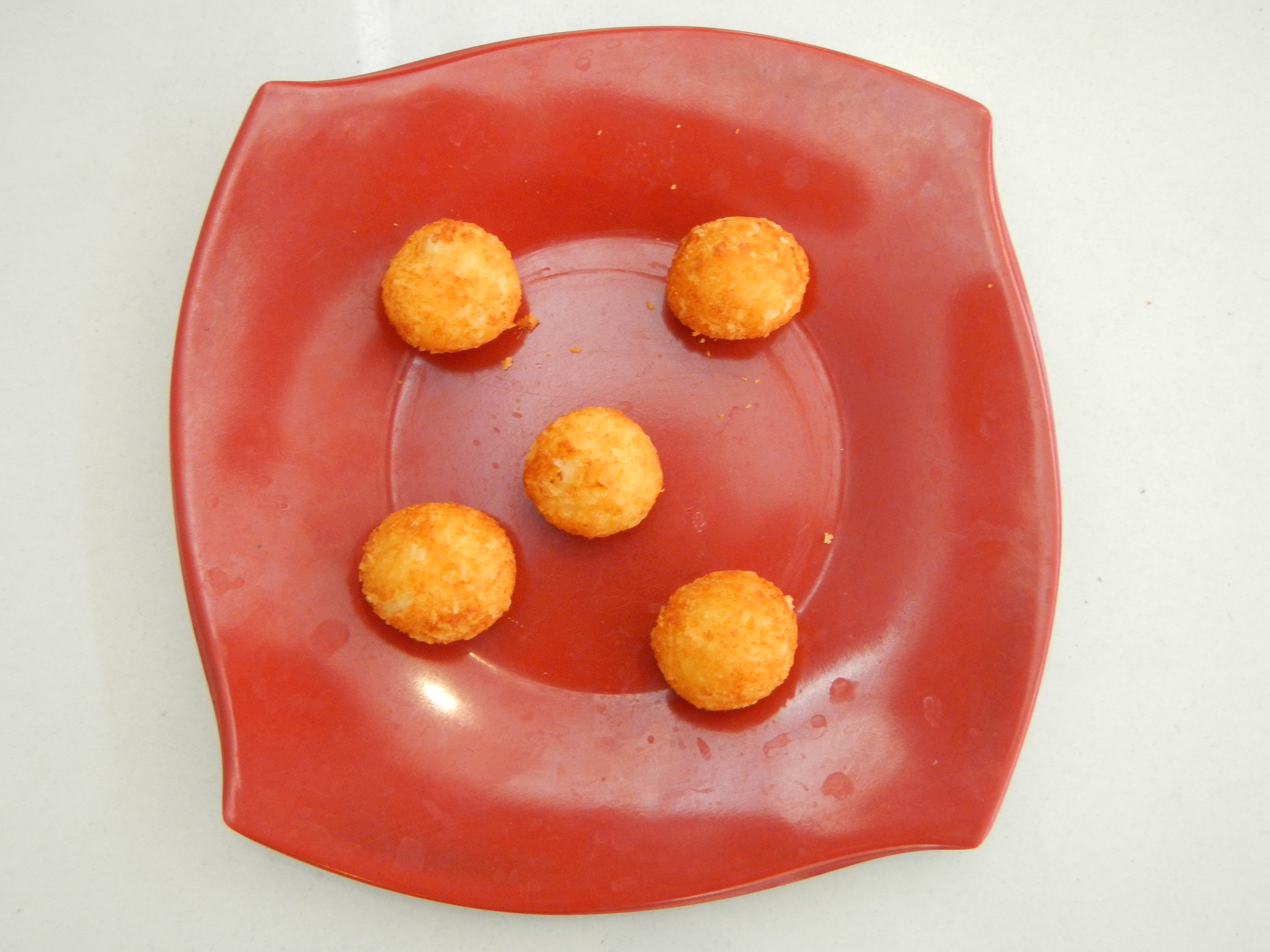
Potato balls (add ons)
