= Union Internacional Manila F.C. =

Filipino association football club based in Manila

Union Internacional Manila
- Full name: Union Internacional Manila Football Club
- Nickname: The Blue Machine
- Short name: UIM FC
- Founded: 1996; 29 years ago
- Chairman: Rafael Rodríguez
Home colours	Away colours

The Union Internacional Manila (UIM) Football Club, also known as Union Inter-Manila Football Club, or simply Inter Manila, was a Filipino professional football club based in Manila. It was established in 1996 as a recreational football club associated with Spanish firm Unión Fenosa. The club played at the United Football League (UFL).

== History ==
Union International Manila foundation is associated with Unión Fenosa which brought in consultants from Spain and South America to the Philippines. Initially, the club's players held informal football matches at the Jolly Field, a baseball venue inside Meralco's compound. The first match of the club under the "Unión Fenosa" name was in 1997 against the Philippine women's national team. The club was led by head coach Jose Lupo. Unión Fenosa continued to organize games at the Jolly Field and joined various football tournaments including futsal, 7-a-side, and beach soccer competitions.

The club renamed themselves as Union F.C. by September 2000 when it joined the Ateneo Football Tournament, due to most of its players not being affiliated with Unión Fenosa by that time. Lupo left for Spain in 2003 with Uruguayan Esteban Alonso succeeding him as head coach. Alonso left in December 2005 and was succeeded by Dominic Samson, who became Union's first Filipino head coach. Under Samson's watch, the club was reinforced by several Filipino players and played in the UFL Championships in 2006 and 2007. In 2009, Rafael Rodriguez took over as head coach.

Union joined the then top-flight United Football League in 2010, finishing third in the league table. Despite their finish, they self relegated to the second division for the 2011 season. They played in the UFL Division 2 until the 2013 season and since then the club has been inactive.

== Records ==
Season	Division	Teams	Position	PFF NMCC	UFL Cup	AFC PC
No league yet					—	—
2010	1	8	Third	—	Group Stage	—
2011	2	8	5th	—	Group Stage	—
2012	2	12	5th	—	Qualifying Round	—
2013	2	9	Runner-up	DNQ	Quarter-finals	DNQ

Key

- Tms. = Number of teams
- Pos. = Position in league
- TBD = To be determined
- DNQ = Did not qualify

Note: Performances of the club after the UFL Division 1 was created.

== Honors ==
- Terry Razon Copa Filipina

- Winners (1): 2006

- UFL Division 1

- Winners (2): 2006, 2007
- Third Place (1): 2010

- UFL Division 2

- Runners-up (1): 2013
