= Alfred Osei =

Ghanaian footballer

Personal information
- Full name: Alfred Kofi Osei
- Date of birth: 7 July 1988 (age 38)
- Height: 1.72 m (5 ft 7 1/2 in)
- Position: Defender

Senior career*
Years	Team	Apps	(Gls)
2014–2020	Kaya–Iloilo	58	(13)
- * Club domestic league appearances and goals as of 12:56, 4 January 2019 (UTC)

Alfred Kofi Osei (born 7 July 1988) is a Ghanaian former footballer who last played as a defender for Filipino side Kaya–Iloilo.

== Career statistics ==
=== Club ===
As of 4 January 2019.

Club	Season	League			Cup		Continental		Other		Total	
Club	Season	Division	Apps	Goals	Apps	Goals	Apps	Goals	Apps	Goals	Apps	Goals
Kaya–Iloilo	2014	United Football League	18	0	0	0	–		0	0	18	0
Kaya–Iloilo	2015	United Football League	10	1	0	0	–		0	0	10	1
Kaya–Iloilo	2016	United Football League	6	0	0	0	6 (Note: Appearances in the AFC Champions League)	1	0	0	12	1
Kaya–Iloilo	2017	Philippines Football League	?	5	0	0	–		3 (Note: Appearances in the PFL Finals Series)	0	3	5
Kaya–Iloilo	2018	Philippines Football League	24	7	0	0	–		0	0	24	7
Kaya–Iloilo	2019	Philippine Premier League	0	0	0	0	–		0	0	0	0
Career total			58	13	0	0	6	1	3	0	67	14
