= Iloilo Sports Complex =

Sports center in Iloilo City, Philippines

Coordinates: 10°42′42″N 122°33′45″E

- Iloilo Sports Center
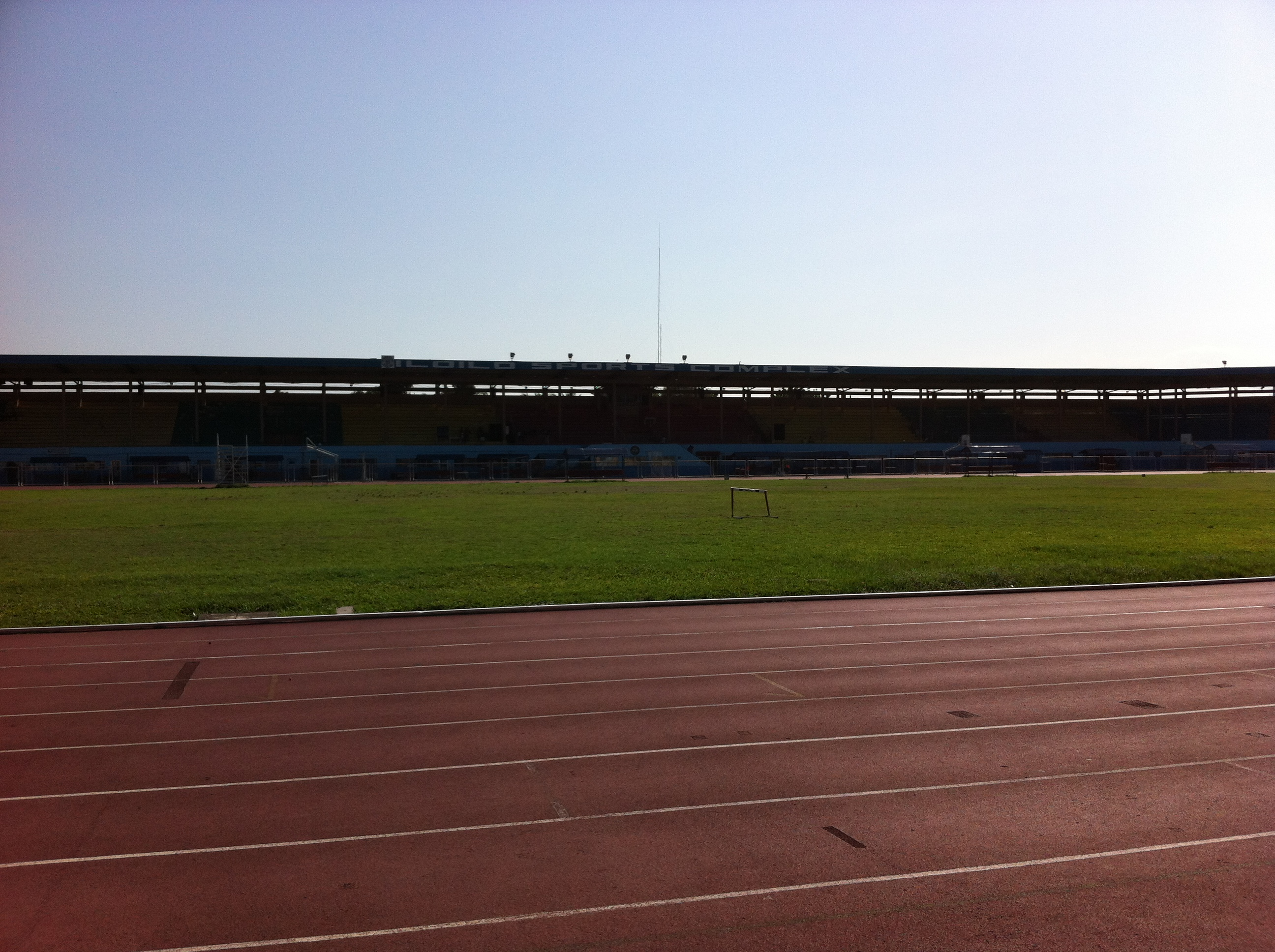
- The running track and stands
- Interactive map of Iloilo Sports Complex
- Location: Iloilo City, Philippines
- Owner: Iloilo Provincial Government
- Capacity: 7,000
- Surface: Grass

Construction
- Renovated: 2014, 2015

Tenants
- Iloilo F.A. Kaya F.C.–Iloilo; Kaya F.C.–Iloilo (women); Iloilo United Royals

The Iloilo Sports Complex, also known as the Iloilo Sports Center, is a multi-use sports complex in La Paz, Iloilo City, Philippines. It is the venue of athletic events in Iloilo province and Western Visayas. It occasionally hosts large gatherings, such as concerts. Its main stadium has a seating capacity of 7,000.

Iloilo Sports Complex includes an Olympic-size swimming pool, an oval running track, a football field, two volleyball, and four badminton courts and a court each for basketball and tennis. An indoor gymnasium is located 200 meters away from the main site.

The athletics track underwent repair in 2014 which costed ₱100 thousand though it had to be rehabilitated again due to the number of sporting events hosted by the venue. The sports venue was closed in October 2015 for renovation. The ₱18 million rehabilitation was completed in December 2015. The athletics track was rubberized and had its lanes painted. The football field also switched to another type of Bermuda grass.

It hosts the home matches of Iloilo F.A. football team. In February 2018, Kaya Futbol Club adopted the Iloilo Sports Complex as their home venue. Liga Futbol Inc., the organization that manages the Philippines Football League, approved the usage of the field for Kaya's league matches on April 20, 2018.

== Gallery ==
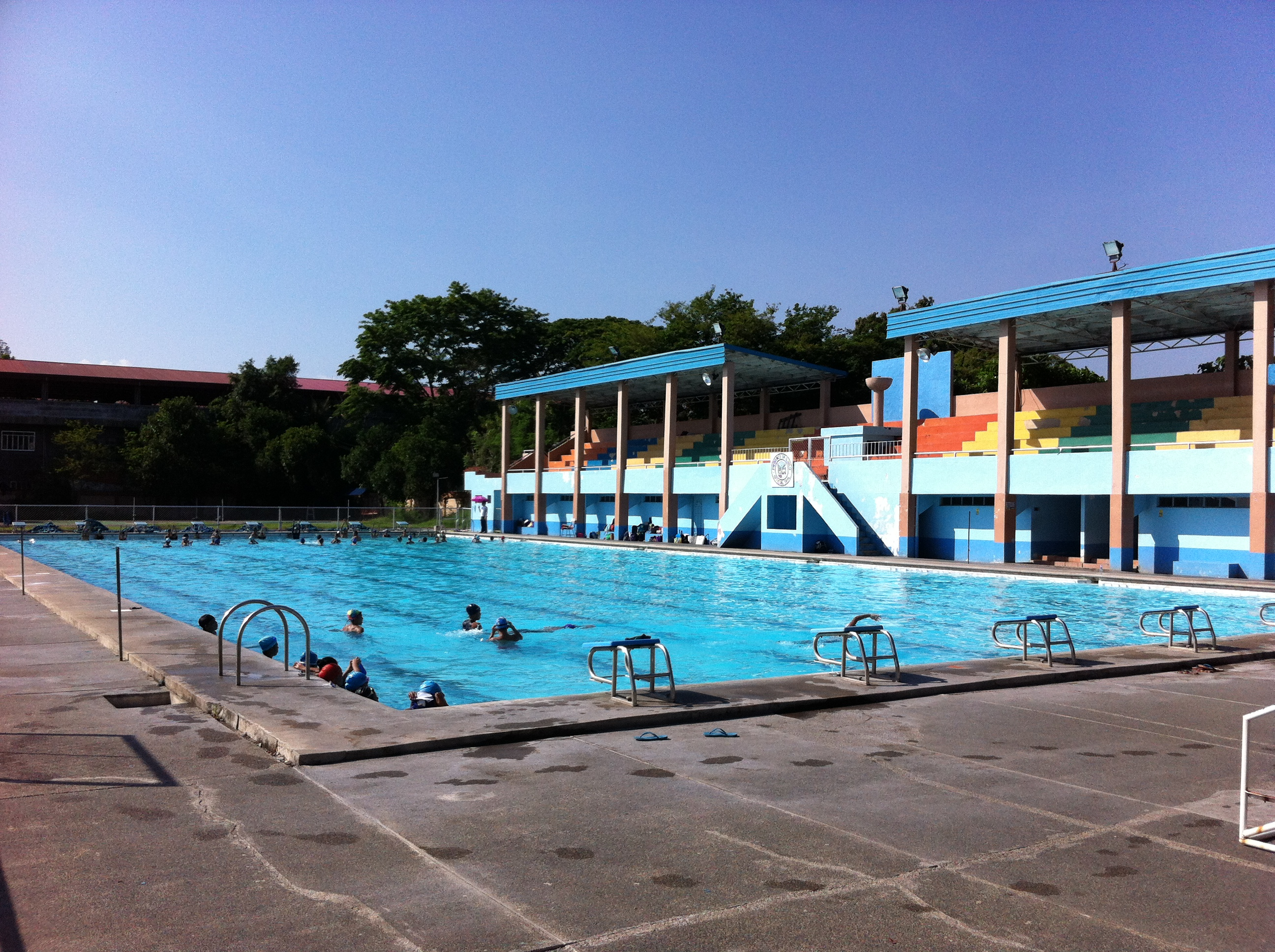
The swimming pool at the sports complex

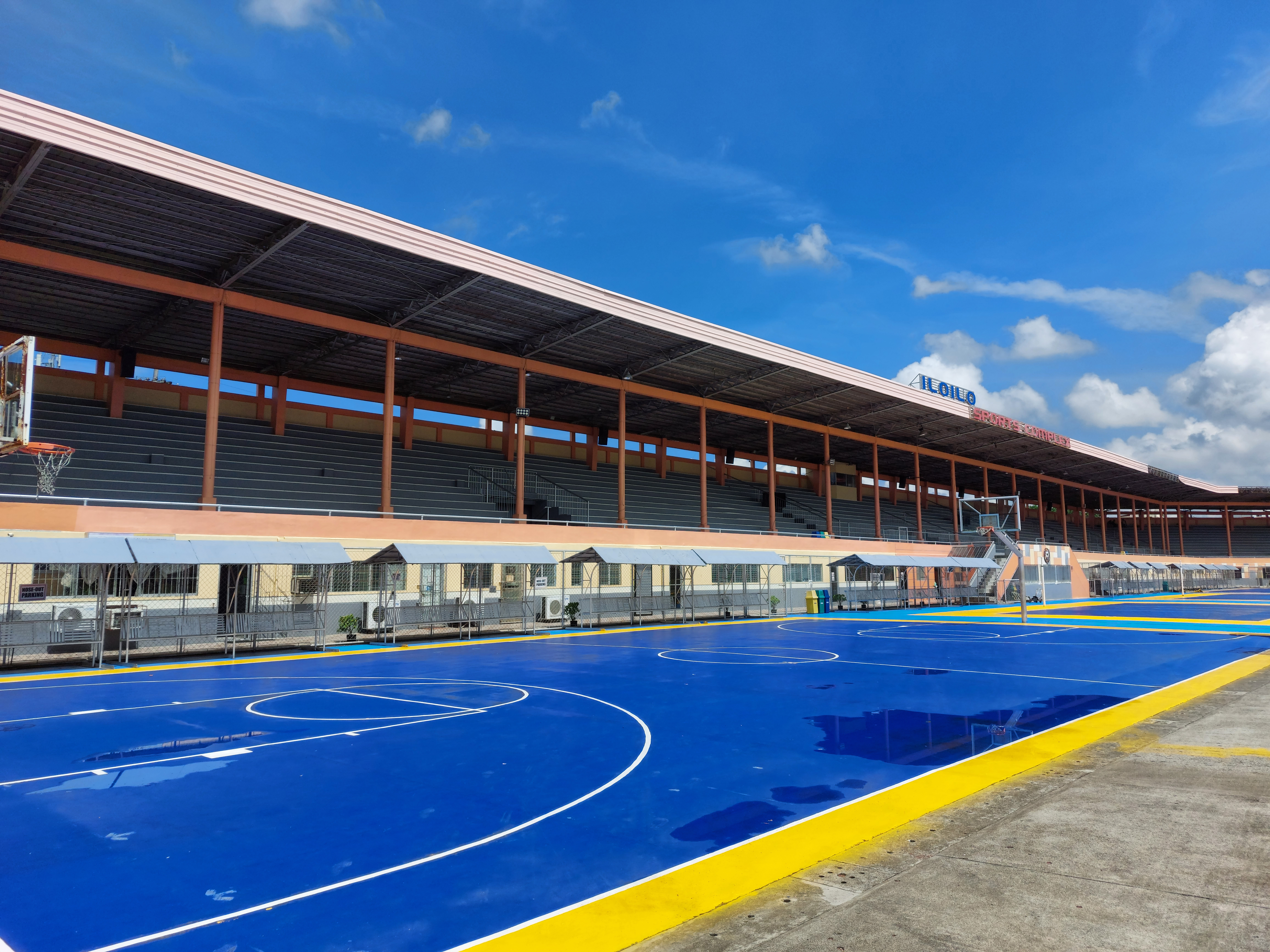
The grandstand of the sports complex
