= Team Socceroo F.C. =

Team Socceroo
- Full name: Team Socceroo Football Club
- Nicknames: Club ng Pamilya (lit. 'The Family's Club')
- Short name: TSFC
- Founded: 2005; 21 years ago
- Website: http://teamsocceroo.com

Team Socceroo Football Club (TSFC) is a football club based in Metro Manila, Philippines. It joined the national second division in 2012. From the 2014–15 season, the TSFC played in the Division 1 of the United Football League, the country's top football league, after topping Division 2 in the 2013 season. In 2015, it changed its name into Sigla F.C., but ultimately withdrew from the 2016 season. The club reverted to its older name in 2017.

== History ==
=== Foundation and early years ===
Team Socceroo F.C. was founded in 2005 by the Reyes brothers led by Jose "Wool" Reyes, the eldest brother. The brothers along with their friends and old teammates from PAREF Southridge School formed a team and began joining football tournaments and festivals.

The TSFC later opened its first football camp. In 2010, TSFC Camp was launched at Corinthian's Village football field in Quezon City which was deemed a success. In 2011, the club established two more football camps in San Lorenzo Village football field in Makati and Tahanan Village football field in Parañaque and there are further plans to open more football camps in other Metro Manila.

=== United Football League ===
In the third quarter of 2011, Team Socceroo competed in the United Football League (UFL) Cup and finished 12th out of 28 teams. For the 2012 UFL season, TSFC got admitted to the 2nd Division of the UFL. In 2013, they topped Division 2 and earned promotion to the first division where they competed for two seasons. In 2015, the name of the club was changed to Sigla Football Club. The club reverted to its older name in 2017.

=== Post-UFL ===
Since Team Soccerroo left the UFL, it decided to focus on running its youth academies. In 2018, TSFC contributed participants at the 6th Gazprom Football for Friendship (F4F) World Championship in Russia. TSFC youth player AJ Boy Victoriano played as a midfielder for the multinational Team Komodo Dragon which finished runners-up in the tournament. Matteo De Venecia, also a youth TSFC member, participated as a journalist. They have also participated in the 7's Football League.

== Club image ==
The club positions itself as the football club for the family and is thus nicknamed Club ng Pamilya (lit. 'The Family's Club') The club's motto is Plenus Pectus which translates from Latin as "Full Heart". It also served as a personal motto for the club's founder Wool Reyes.

=== Crest ===
The club's first crest 2005–2013

2015–2017 (as Sigla F.C.)

== Records ==
Season	Division	Tms.	Pos.	PFF NMCC	UFL Cup	AFC PC
2011	—	—	—	—	Round of 16	—
2012	2	12	7th	—	Group stage	—
2013	2	9	1st (Prom)	—	Group stage	—

Key

- Tms. = Number of teams
- Pos. = Position in league
- TBD = To be determined
- DNQ = Did not qualify

Note: Performances of the club indicated here was after the UFL Division 1 created (as a semi-pro league) in 2009.

== Honors ==
=== Domestic competitions ===
- United Football League Division 2

- Winners: 2013
