= Camelo Tacusalme =

Filipino footballer (born 1989)

Personal information
- Full name: Camelo Perez Tacusalme
- Date of birth: 5 August 1989 (age 37)
- Place of birth: Talisay, Negros Occidental, Philippines
- Height: 1.75 m (5 ft 9 in)
- Position: Defender

Team information
- Current team: Kaya
- Number: 5

College career
Years	Team	Apps	(Gls)
–	West Negros University		

Senior career*
Years	Team	Apps	(Gls)
?–2012	Pachanga		
2013–2016	Ceres		
2016–2017	JPV Marikina	15	(0)
2018–2024	Kaya		(0)

International career^{‡}
2017	Philippines	1	(0)
- * Club domestic league appearances and goals as of 10 August 2018 ‡ National team caps and goals as of 12 June 2017

Camelo Tacusalme (born 5 August 1989) is a Filipino football manager and a former player. He is the current team manager of Philippine Football League club Kaya-Iloilo.

== Career ==
Tacusalme played for the West Negros University football team. In the United Football League, he played for Pachanga until its merger with Diliman to become Pachanga Diliman. Tacusalme then moved to Ceres–La Salle and later to JP Voltes. When the UFL was dissolved he remained with the club which joined the inaugural season of the Philippines Football League under a new name, JPV Marikina.

After the 2017 season he joined Kaya–Iloilo in January 2018. He debuted for the club in a pre-season friendly against Sabah FA on January 25, 2018.

=== International ===
Tacusalme also played for the Philippines national football team in a friendly match against China in Guanzhou. He played in the centerback position. His team was defeated 1–8 in that match.
