= University of Makati Stadium =

Sporting venue in Metro Manila, Philippines

Coordinates: 14°33′49″N 121°03′25″E

- Interactive map of University of Makati Stadium
- Location: Taguig, Metro Manila, Philippines
- Owner: University of Makati
- Operator: University of Makati
- Capacity: 3,295
- Surface: Artificial turf

Tenants
- United Football League (previously); Kaya F.C.–Makati (2017); United Makati (2019); Global Makati (previously); Davao Aguilas F.C. (sometimes)

The University of Makati Stadium, simply known as the UMak, is a football and track field stadium of the University of Makati located in Taguig, Philippines.

== Background ==
The stadium has hosted United Football League games as well as a friendly match of the Philippines national football team. It also has hosted the National Capital Region F.A. Division 3 League.

The stadium was assigned as the training ground of the Thailand national football team during the group stage of the 2016 AFF Championship. The Thai head coach criticized the hosts for the poor quality of the pitch before their very first game of the tournament and the long grass in the pitch had to be trimmed before the Thais began their training session.

Kaya F.C.–Makati, who were set to participate in the inaugural edition of the Philippines Football League, announced in January 2017 that they have made the stadium as their home ground. However, the following season they moved to Iloilo.

The stadium, however, along with the rest of the university, is subject to ownership dispute between the cities of Makati and Taguig following the aftermath of the 2023 Supreme Court ruling that places the entirety of the Fort Bonifacio, including the Embo barangays, as an integral part of the City of Taguig.

== Facilities ==
UMak has a grandstand, light towers, and a rubberized track. The Philippine Rugby Football Union offered to install a drainage system to solve long-term pitch issues. By October 2018, the surface has been converted to artificial grass.
