= 2019 Ceres–Negros F.C. season =

Ceres–Negros 2019 football season

Ceres–Negros
2019 season
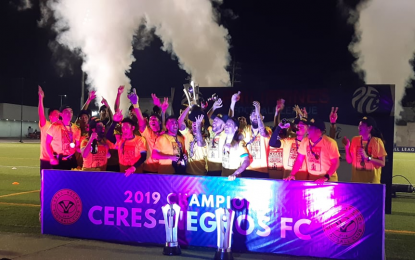
- Ceres–Negros players celebrating their third consecutive PFL title
- Chairman: Leo Rey V. Yanson
- Head Coach: Risto Vidaković
- Stadium: Panaad Stadium
- Philippines Football League: Winners
- Copa Paulino Alcantara: Winners
- AFC Champions League: Preliminary round 1
- AFC Cup: ASEAN Zone Semi-final
- Top goalscorer: League: Bienvenido Marañón (30); All: Bienvenido Marañón (40)
- Biggest win: 0–13 (Aug 28 v Global Makati, PFL Round 15)
- Biggest defeat: 1–2 (Feb 5 v Yangon United, ACL qualifying); 0–1 (May 15 v Becamex Binh Duong, AFC Cup group); 2–1 (Jun 25 v Hà Nội, AFC Cup ASEAN SF)
Home colors	Away colors	Third colors
- All statistics correct as of November 17, 2019.

The 2019 season was Ceres–Negros Football Club's 8th season in existence and the club's 3rd consecutive season in the top flight of Philippine football. In addition to the Philippines Football League, the club competed in the Copa Paulino Alcantara, the AFC Cup, and the first preliminary round of the AFC Champions League. Competitive matches were played from February 5 to November 16, 2019. Ceres–Negros won the Philippines Football League for the third successive season, this time without a single defeat – a record of 22 wins and 2 draws, which included a 17-game winning streak. They also won the Copa Paulino Alcantara unbeaten, completing the domestic double without a single defeat in domestic competitions. The club was less successful in Asian competitions: after losing the first preliminary round of the AFC Champions League, they were transferred to the AFC Cup where they topped their group but were eliminated in the ASEAN Zonal semi-final. Ceres had only 3 losses overall.

Martin Steuble, who was club captain since 2017, left the club in July and was succeeded by Carli de Murga. The main additions to the team were striker Robert Lopez Mendy, and midfielders James Younghusband and Takashi Odawara. Ceres also signed defender Álvaro Silva, who played for the club from February to June.

Ceres–Negros players also won individual awards: Bienvenido Marañón was the 2019 AFC Cup top scorer while Stephan Schröck won the PFL Golden Ball. In the Copa Paulino Alcantara, Robert Lopez Mendy won the Golden Boot while Takashi Odawara won the Golden Ball. Goalkeeper Roland Müller won the Golden Glove in both the PFL and Copa Paulino Alcantara.

In July, the club's future became uncertain when club owner and chairman, Leo Rey Yanson, was ousted as president and CEO of Vallacar Transit by his brother Roy. As the new president, Roy Yanson did not like to invest the company's money into the football club, though Leo Rey insisted that he spends his personal money for the club. On August 11, Leo Rey regained control of the company.

== Season overview ==
After winning their second consecutive league title in the previous season, Ceres–Negros participated in the qualifiers for the 2019 AFC Champions League. However, before the competitions began, veteran players Patrick Reichelt and Manuel Ott left the club. The notable pre-season signing was Philippines national team defender Álvaro Silva, who previously played under Risto Vidaković at Cádiz. On February 5, Ceres began their campaign by hosting Myanmar National League champions Yangon United for the preliminary round 1, to whom they lost 2–1. As such, they were relegated to the group stage of the AFC Cup, the second-tier competition of Asian club football.

In the AFC Cup, Ceres–Negros were in Group G alongside Vietnamese Cup winners Becamex Bình Dương, Myanmar National League runners-up Shan United, and Indonesian Liga 1 champions Persija Jakarta. Ceres topped their group by winning all but one of their group matches, losing their last match—at home to Becamex Bình Dương 1–0. Their notable group match was the comeback win away to Persija Jakarta on April 23. After a goalless first half, Ceres were down by two goals at the 57th minute until Miguel Tanton and Bienvenido Marañón managed to equalize. Mike Ott then scored the winning goal in injury time, ending the match 3–2.

In the ASEAN Zonal semi-finals, Ceres faced V.League 1 champions Hà Nội who topped Group F. The first leg, played at Panaad on June 18, ended in a 1–1 draw. Ceres went on to lose the second leg in Hanoi on June 25, with a score of 2–1 (3–2 on aggregate), thus failing to make their third consecutive ASEAN Zonal final. Although they were eliminated, Bienvenido Marañón was awarded as AFC Cup top scorer at the end of the season, with 10 goals in eight matches.

In the domestic level, Ceres were supposed to participate in the Philippine Premier League (PPL)—the new top-tier league as the Philippines Football League (PFL) was dissolved after the troubled 2018 season, which Ceres won. However, the PPL was also plagued with numerous issues, with Stallion Laguna and Global Makati withdrawing a day before the season commenced. Ceres later withdrew after the first matchday (in which they were not scheduled to play), and later the Philippine Football Federation (PFF) decided to withdraw its sanction of the PPL thus dissolving the league.

The PFF then decided to revive the PFL for a third season. Ceres' opening PFL fixture was at the Rizal Memorial Stadium against Stallion Laguna on May 25, which ended in a 2–2 draw. On May 29, they earned their first league win of the season at the expense of debutants Philippine Air Force, 5–0. The next day, Kevin Ingreso left the club; he played three and a half years with Ceres. On June 28, notable pre-season signing Álvaro Silva announced his surprise departure. While on July 4, Martin Steuble, who captained Ceres since 2017, left the club to join Port of the Thai League 1. Despite the loss of several key players, Ceres continued to win their matches with Carli de Murga as the new captain. They notably thrashed Philippine Air Force 12–0 on July 13, the league's largest home win of the season.

In the midseason transfer window, Ceres made three notable signings: Senegalese striker Robert Lopez Mendy, who was the PFL's top scorer in 2018 with Kaya–Iloilo, Philippines national team midfielder James Younghusband, and Japanese midfielder Takashi Odawara. On August 28, Ceres thrashed Global Makati 13–0 away, the league's largest margin of victory in the season. On September 28, a 1–1 draw with Stallion Laguna ended Ceres' winning streak at 17 games. After winning the subsequent fixtures, Ceres secured their third consecutive league title by defeating Green Archers United 3–1 on October 12, with two matches to spare. After winning the two remaining games, Ceres completed a historic unbeaten season with a total of 22 wins and 2 draws (68 points). Goalkeeper Roland Müller won the season's Golden Glove while midfielder Stephan Schröck won the Golden Ball. With 30 goals, striker Bienvenido Marañón was the Golden Boot runner-up behind Kaya's Jordan Mintah, who scored 31.

After failing to progress from the group stage in 2018, Ceres were determined to win the 2019 edition of the Copa Paulino Alcantara. They were drawn in Group A alongside Mendiola, Green Archers United, and Philippines U22 (who are participating in preparation for the Southeast Asian Games). In their first group match, they were held to a 2–2 draw by Mendiola. This was followed by wins over the two other clubs as Ceres topped the group. In the semi-finals, they defeated Group B runners-up Stallion Laguna 4–3 to earn their first ever finals appearance. On November 16, Ceres faced defending champions Kaya–Iloilo in the final. Ceres won the match 2–1, completing their domestic double. Ceres won the final despite having only 14 players available in their squad, as the others were either resting or on international duty. Head coach Risto Vidaković was also absent for the final, thus it was assistant coach Jooc Treyes who managed the team. The Copa's individual awards were all won by Ceres players: striker Robert Lopez Mendy, who scored five goals in the tournament, won the Golden Boot, goalkeeper Roland Müller won the Golden Glove, and midfielder Takashi Odawara won the Golden Ball for his defensive performances. With the Copa win, Ceres finished their 2019 season without a single defeat in domestic competitions.

=== Ownership crisis ===
On July 7, Ceres–Negros' owner and chairman, Leo Rey Yanson, was ousted as president and CEO of Vallacar Transit in a boardroom coup led by his older brother Roy and supported by three of his other siblings. In a statement, Leo Rey called the move "illegal" and refused to recognize it, saying: "The removal was only done through a special meeting of which the election/removal of the president was not even included in the agenda." As the new president, Roy Yanson accused Leo Rey of using the company's funds for the football team, adding that players who are "just simply kicking the ball" are earning more than the Vallacar Transit employees. Leo Rey defended the football club and denied the accusation, insisting that he funds the team using his own money, saying: "I don't need to justify how much I'm spending for the club because it's my own personal money." Leo Rey also spent for the refurbishment of the Panaad Stadium, the club's home ground. Nonetheless, the Yanson siblings' battle for control of the company made the team's future uncertain. The football players expressed their support for Leo Rey, with Stephan Schröck saying: "He's been there for us not only as an owner or manager or benefactor. He was, for the longest time for us, a friend almost like a dad to everyone at the club. We owe him." On August 11, Leo Rey regained control of the company's headquarters in Bacolod with the help of his sister Ginnette, mother Olivia, and the Philippine National Police.

== Players ==
=== Squad information ===
As it stands on November 16, 2019

No.	Pos.	Nat.	Name	Notes
1	GK	(Philippines)	Roland Müller	Second nationality: (Germany)
2	DF	(Philippines)	Sean Kane	
4	DF	(Spain)	Súper	
5	MF	(Philippines)	Mike Ott	Second nationality: (Germany)
6	FW	(Philippines)	Charles Ivan Barberan	
7	MF	(Spain)	Bienvenido Marañón	
8	FW	(Philippines)	Miguel Tanton	Second nationality: (United States)
9	MF	(Japan)	Takashi Odawara	
10	MF	(Philippines)	OJ Porteria	Second nationality: (United States)
11	MF	(Philippines)	Tristan Kit Robles	
12	MF	(Philippines)	Stephan Schröck	Second nationality: (Germany)
13	DF	(Philippines)	Dennis Villanueva	
14	DF	(Philippines)	Carli de Murga (captain)	Second nationality: (Spain)
16	MF	(Philippines)	Dylan de Bruycker	Second nationality: (Belgium)
17	DF	(Philippines)	Junior Muñoz	Second nationality: (Netherlands)
18	DF	(Philippines)	Joshua Dutosme	
23	MF	(Philippines)	James Younghusband	Second nationality: (United Kingdom)
24	GK	(Philippines)	Florencio Badelic Jr.	
25	GK	(Philippines)	Ronilo Bayan Jr.	
28	DF	(Philippines)	Jeffrey Christiaens	Second nationality: (Belgium)
30	MF	(Philippines)	Angélo Marasigan	
71	FW	(Senegal)	Robert Lopez Mendy	

== Transfers ==
Note: Flags indicate national team as defined under FIFA eligibility rules. Players may hold more than one non-FIFA nationality.

=== In ===
Date	Pos.	Nat.	Name	Age	From	Type	Ref.
Pre-season
January 21, 2019	MF	(Philippines)	Dylan de Bruycker	21	(Philippines) Davao Aguilas	Free transfer	
January 21, 2019	MF	(Philippines)	Angélo Marasigan	26	(Philippines) Global Cebu	Free transfer	
January 21, 2019	MF	(Philippines)	Miguel Tanton	29	(Philippines) Kaya–Iloilo	Free transfer	
January 21, 2019	DF	(Philippines)	Dennis Villanueva	26	(Philippines) Davao Aguilas	Free transfer	
January 29, 2019	GK	(Philippines)	Ronilo Bayan Jr.	24	(Philippines) Davao Aguilas	Free transfer	
January 29, 2019	DF	(Philippines)	Álvaro Silva	34	(Malaysia) Kedah	Free transfer	
February 21, 2019	GK	(Philippines)	Florencio "Jun" Badelic Jr.	24	(Philippines) Global Cebu	Free transfer	
February 21, 2019	FW	(Bosnia and Herzegovina)	Mahir Karić	32	(Bosnia and Herzegovina) Olimpik	Free transfer	
Mid-season
July 19, 2019	FW	(Senegal)	Robert Lopez Mendy	32	(Malaysia) Uitm		
July 2019	FW	(Philippines)	Charles Barberan		(Philippines) University of St. La Salle		
July 2019	MF	(Philippines)	Tristan Robles		(Philippines) University of St. La Salle		
August 2019	MF	(Japan)	Takashi Odawara	26	Unattached	Free transfer	
August 15, 2019	MF	(Philippines)	James Younghusband	32	Unattached	Free transfer	

=== Out ===
Date	Pos.	Nat.	Name	Age	To	Type	Ref.
Pre-season
January 23, 2019	MF	(Philippines)	Manuel Ott	26	(Thailand) Ratchaburi Mitr Phol	Free transfer	
January 23, 2019	FW	(Philippines)	Patrick Reichelt	30	(Malaysia) Melaka United	Free transfer	
January 29, 2019	DF	(Philippines)	Jerry Barbaso	30	Unattached		
January 29, 2019	GK	(Spain)	Toni Doblas	38	Unattached		
February 20, 2019	DF	(Philippines)	Amani Aguinaldo	23	(Malaysia) PKNP	Loan out	
	GK	(Philippines)	Eduard Sacapaño		Retired		
Mid-season
May 30, 2019	MF	(Philippines)	Kevin Ingreso	26	(Thailand) Buriram United	Transfer	
June 28, 2019	DF	(Philippines)	Álvaro Silva	35	(Thailand) Suphanburi	Transfer	
July 4, 2019	DF	(Philippines)	Martin Steuble	31	(Thailand) Port	Transfer	
July 17, 2019	FW	(Philippines)	Curt Dizon	25	(Thailand) Chonburi	Transfer	
July 2019	FW	(Bosnia and Herzegovina)	Mahir Karić	32	(Bosnia and Herzegovina) Radnik Bijeljina	Released	
August 15, 2019	MF	(Philippines)	Omid Nazari	28	(Indonesia) Persib Bandung	Transfer	
	MF	(Philippines)	Paul Mulders	38	Unattached	Released	
	FW	(Australia)	Blake Powell	28	Unattached	Released	

== Kits ==
Supplier: Grand Sport / Sponsor: Ceres Liner

Home	Away	Alternate 1	Alternate 2	Alternate 3

Goalkeeper 1	Goalkeeper 2

== Competitions ==
=== Overview ===
Competition	First match	Last match	Starting round	Final position	Record							
Competition	First match	Last match	Starting round	Final position	Pld	W	D	L	GF	GA	GD	Win %
Philippines Football League	May 25, 2019	October 19, 2019	Matchday 1	Winners	24	22	2	0	99	12	+87	91.67
Copa Paulino Alcantara	October 26, 2019	November 16, 2019	Group stage	Winners	5	4	1	0	14	7	+7	80.00
AFC Cup	February 26, 2019	June 25, 2019	Group stage	ASEAN Zonal Semi-final	8	5	1	2	17	9	+8	62.50
AFC Champions League	February 5, 2019	February 5, 2019	Preliminary round 1	Preliminary round 1	1	0	0	1	1	2	−1	0.00
Total					38	31	4	3	131	30	+101	81.58

Last updated: February 20, 2020
Source: Competitions

=== Philippines Football League ===
==== Standings ====
Pos	Team	Pld	W	D	L	GF	GA	GD	Pts	Qualification or relegation
1	Ceres–Negros (C)	24	22	2	0	99	12	+87	68	Qualification for AFC Champions League preliminary round 1 (Note: If the league champions cannot qualify for the AFC Champions League group stage, they will enter the AFC Cup group stage.)
2	Kaya–Iloilo	24	18	2	4	60	16	+44	56	Qualification for AFC Cup group stage (Note: Since league champions Ceres–Negros were also Copa Paulino Alcantara winners, the league runners-up qualified for the AFC Cup group stage.)
3	Stallion Laguna	24	11	6	7	54	25	+29	39	
4	Green Archers United	24	10	5	9	42	37	+5	35	
5	Mendiola 1991	24	6	5	13	34	54	−20	23	

Source: PFL
Rules for classification: 1) Points; 2) Goal difference; 3) Goals scored
(C) Champions
Notes:

Results summary

Overall								Home						Away					
Pld	W	D	L	GF	GA	GD	Pts	W	D	L	GF	GA	GD	W	D	L	GF	GA	GD
24	22	2	0	99	12	+87	68	11	1	0	47	4	+43	11	1	0	52	8	+44

Last updated: October 19, 2019.
Source: http://pfl.org.ph/ PFL]

==== Results by round ====
Round	1	2	3	4	5	6	7	8	9	10	11	12	13	14	15	16	17	18	19	20	21	22	23	24
Ground	H	A	A	H	A	H	H	H	H	H	A	H	A	A	A	A	H	A	A	A	H	H	H	A
Result	D	W	W	W	W	W	W	W	W	W	W	W	W	W	W	W	W	W	D	W	W	W	W	W
Position	3	2	1	3	2	1	1	1	1	1	1	1	1	1	1	1	1	1	1	1	1	1	1	1

Updated to match(es) played on October 19, 2019. Source: PFL
A = Away; H = Home; W = Win; D = Draw; L = Loss

==== Matches ====
May 25, 2019 1	Ceres–Negros	2–2	Stallion Laguna	Manila
19:00 UTC+8	Steuble 25'; Marañón 53'		Sy 5'; De Murga 53' (o.g.)	Stadium: Rizal Memorial Stadium

May 29, 2019 2	Philippine Air Force	0–5	Ceres–Negros	Manila
16:00 UTC+8			Marañón 15', 76', 82'; Dizon 20', 81'	Stadium: Rizal Memorial Stadium

June 1, 2019 3	Global Makati	0–8	Ceres–Negros	Carmona
15:30 UTC+8			Marañón 9', 13', 33', 81'; Mi. Ott 45+2'; Karić 74', 89'; Christiaens 89'	Stadium: PFF National Training Centre

June 29, 2019 4	Ceres–Negros	4–0	Mendiola	Manila
16:00 UTC+8	Marañón 2', 79'; Zabala 29' (o.g.); Dizon 65'			Stadium: Rizal Memorial Stadium

July 3, 2019 5	Green Archers United	3–4	Ceres–Negros	Carmona
15:30 UTC+8	Ariola 12', 40', 54'		Porteria 5'; Schröck 6'; Gumban 18' (o.g.); Marañón 37'	Stadium: PFF National Training Centre

July 6, 2019	Stallion Laguna	v	Ceres–Negros	Biñan
15:30 UTC+8				Stadium: Biñan Football Stadium
Note: Postponed due to unplayable conditions caused by heavy rain.

July 10, 2019 6	Ceres–Negros	2–1	Kaya–Iloilo	Carmona
15:30 UTC+8	Marañón 68', 71'		Bedic 62'	Stadium: PFF National Training Centre

July 13, 2019 7	Ceres–Negros	12–0	Philippine Air Force	Carmona
15:30 UTC+8	Marañón 4', 42', 45'; Tanton 7'; Schröck 9', 22', 85'; Dizon 69'; Mi. Ott 76', 78', 87', 88'			Stadium: PFF National Training Centre

July 17, 2019 8	Ceres–Negros	3–0^{a} Awarded	Global Makati	Carmona
15:30 UTC+8				Stadium: PFF National Training Centre

July 21, 2019 9	Ceres–Negros	2–0	Green Archers United	Carmona
15:30 UTC+8	Lobe 7' (o.g.); Mi. Ott 28'			Stadium: PFF National Training Centre

August 3, 2019 10	Ceres–Negros	1–0	Kaya–Iloilo	Lipa
19:00 UTC+8	Porteria 16'			Stadium: Aboitiz Pitch

August 10, 2019 11	Mendiola	2–5	Ceres–Negros	Lipa
16:00 UTC+8	Sendra 10'; Flores 49'		Lopez Mendy 16', 36', 44', 55'; Marañón 90' (pen.)	Stadium: Aboitiz Pitch

August 14, 2019 12	Ceres–Negros	5–0	Stallion Laguna	Lipa
19:00 UTC+8	Marañón 32', 88'; Mi. Ott 35'; De Murga 38'; Lopez Mendy 64'			Stadium: Aboitiz Pitch

August 17, 2019 13	Philippine Air Force	0–3	Ceres–Negros	Lipa
16:00 UTC+8			Súper 15'; De Bruycker 34'; Lopez Mendy 59'	Stadium: Aboitiz Pitch

August 21, 2019 14	Mendiola	1–4	Ceres–Negros	Lipa
19:00 UTC+8	Angeles 30'		Mi. Ott 17', 60'; Lopez Mendy 22', 41'	Stadium: Aboitiz Pitch

August 28, 2019 15	Global Makati	0–13	Ceres–Negros	Lipa
16:00 UTC+8			Marañón 20', 59', 80', 88'; Schröck 25'; Lopez Mendy 30', 56', 79'; Mi. Ott 40', 45', 65'; Odawara 51'; J. Younghusband 88'	Stadium: Aboitiz Pitch

September 14, 2019 16	Ceres–Negros	7–0	Philippine Air Force	Lipa
19:00 UTC+8	Marañón 32'; Porteria 35'; Lopez Mendy 39', 72', 75'; Mi. Ott 85'; Villanueva 87'			Stadium: Aboitiz Pitch

September 18, 2019 17	Kaya–Iloilo	0–2	Ceres–Negros	Biñan
15:30 UTC+8			Mi. Ott 15'; Porteria 30'	Stadium: Biñan Football Stadium

September 22, 2019 18	Stallion Laguna	0–2	Ceres–Negros	Biñan
15:30 UTC+8			Marañón 53'; Lopez Mendy 53'	Stadium: Biñan Football Stadium

September 28, 2019 19	Stallion Laguna	1–1	Ceres–Negros	Biñan
15:30 UTC+8	Sy 7'		Lopez Mendy 4'	Stadium: Biñan Football Stadium

October 2, 2019 20	Green Archers United	1–2	Ceres–Negros	Lipa
19:00 UTC+8	Celiz 72'		Lopez Mendy 2'; Porteria 78'	Stadium: Aboitiz Pitch

October 6, 2019 21	Ceres–Negros	3–0^{a} Awarded	Global Makati	Biñan
19:00 UTC+8				Stadium: Biñan Football Stadium

October 12, 2019 22	Ceres–Negros	3–1	Green Archers United	Lipa
19:00 UTC+8	Marasigan 50' Marañón 81', 87'		Celiz 24'	Stadium: Aboitiz Pitch

October 14, 2019 23	Ceres–Negros	3–0	Mendiola	Lipa
19:00 UTC+8	Odawara 2'; Marañón 35', 74'			Stadium: Aboitiz Pitch

October 19, 2019 24	Kaya–Iloilo	0–3	Ceres–Negros	Lipa
16:00 UTC+8			Porteria 73'; Marañón 90'; Younghusband 90+3'	Stadium: Aboitiz Pitch

Note:

a Global forfeited the match due to an inability to field a team. The result was 0-3 in favor of Ceres.

=== Copa Paulino Alcantara ===
==== Group stage ====
On October 20, Ceres–Negros were drawn in Group A of the Copa Paulino Alcantara alongside Mendiola, Green Archers United, and Philippines U22.

Pos	Team	Pld	W	D	L	GF	GA	GD	Pts	Qualification	CER	MEN	U22	GAU
1	Ceres–Negros	3	2	1	0	8	3	+5	7	Semi-finals	—	2–2	—	4–0
2	Mendiola	3	1	2	0	5	4	+1	5	Semi-finals	—	—	2–2	1–0
3	Philippines U22	3	1	1	1	4	4	0	4		1–2	—	—	—
4	Green Archers United	3	0	0	3	0	6	−6	0		—	—	0–1	—

Source: PFL

October 26, 2019 1	Ceres–Negros	2–2	Mendiola	Lipa
19:00 UTC+8	Lopez Mendy 4', 31'		Hajimehdi 45+1'; Corsame 64'	Stadium: Aboitiz Pitch

October 30, 2019 2	Philippines U22	1–2	Ceres–Negros	Lipa
19:00 UTC+8	Gallantes 30'		De Bruycker 61'; Lopez Mendy 86'	Stadium: Aboitiz Pitch

November 6, 2019 3	Ceres–Negros	4–0	Green Archers United	Lipa
19:00 UTC+8	J. Younghusband 16'; Mi. Ott 68'; Barberan 80'; Lopez Mendy 82'			Stadium: Aboitiz Pitch

==== Semi-finals ====
10 November 2019 Semi-final	Ceres–Negros	4–3	Stallion Laguna	Lipa
16:00 UTC+8	Schrock 18', 69'; Mi. Ott 29', 77'		Najm 9'; Sy 15'; Melliza 85'	Stadium: Aboitiz Pitch

==== Final ====
16 November 2019 Final	Ceres–Negros	2–1	Kaya–Iloilo	Biñan
17:00 UTC+8	Lopez Mendy 30'; Robles 68'		Daniels 85'	Stadium: Biñan Football Stadium

=== AFC Champions League ===
==== Qualifying play-offs ====
February 5, 2019 Preliminary round 1	Ceres–Negros (Philippines)	1–2	(Myanmar) Yangon United	Bacolod
19:30 8:00	Schröck 44'	Live Report; Stats Report	Miller 29'; Kaung Htet Soe 59'	Stadium: Panaad Stadium; Attendance: 7,029; Referee: Masoud Tufayelieh (Syria)

=== AFC Cup ===
==== Group stage ====
The group stage draw was held on November 22, 2018, at the AFC House in Kuala Lumpur, Malaysia. Ceres–Negros were drawn in Group G alongside Vietnamese Cup winners Becamex Bình Dương, Myanmar National League runners-up Shan United, and Indonesian Liga 1 champions Persija Jakarta.

Pos	Team	Pld	W	D	L	GF	GA	GD	Pts	Qualification	CER	BBD	PSJ	SHA
1	(Philippines) Ceres–Negros	6	5	0	1	15	6	+9	15	Zonal semi-finals	—	0–1	1–0	3–2
2	(Vietnam) Becamex Bình Dương	6	4	1	1	13	5	+8	13	Zonal semi-finals	1–3	—	3–1	6–0
3	(Indonesia) Persija Jakarta	6	2	1	3	12	9	+3	7		2–3	0–0	—	6–1
4	(Myanmar) Shan United	6	0	0	6	5	25	−20	0		0–5	1–2	1–3	—

Source: AFC
Rules for classification: Group stage tiebreakers

February 26, 2019 Matchday 1	Ceres–Negros (Philippines)	3–2	(Myanmar) Shan United	Bacolod
19:30 UTC+8	Porteria 19', 87'; Marañón 37' (pen.)	Live Report; Stats Report	Zin Min Tun 50'; Dway Ko Ko Chit 88'	Stadium: Panaad Stadium; Attendance: 5,748; Referee: Yaqoub Al-Hammadi (United Arab Emirates)

March 12, 2019 Matchday 2	Becamex Bình Dương (Vietnam)	1–3	(Philippines) Ceres–Negros	Thủ Dầu Một
18:00 UTC+7	Luiz 72'	Live Report; Stats Report	Marañón 26', 74', 78'	Stadium: Gò Đậu Stadium; Attendance: 3,300; Referee: Yusuke Araki (Japan)

April 3, 2019 Matchday 3	Ceres–Negros (Philippines)	1–0	(Indonesia) Persija Jakarta	Bacolod
19:30 UTC+8	Marañón 9'	Live Report; Stats Report		Stadium: Panaad Park and Stadium; Attendance: 5,878; Referee: Vahid Kazemi (Iran)

April 23, 2019 (Note: The Persija Jakarta v Ceres–Negros match was rescheduled from the original date of 16 April to 23 April due to its proximity to the general election held in Indonesia the next day.) Matchday 4	Persija Jakarta (Indonesia)	2–3	(Philippines) Ceres–Negros	Jakarta
16:00 UTC+6:30	Sandi 49'; Matos 57'	Live Report; Stats Report	Tanton 70'; Marañón 85'; Ott 90+2'	Stadium: Gelora Bung Karno Stadium; Attendance: 26,923; Referee: Sherzod Kasimov (Uzbekistan)

May 1, 2019 Matchday 5	Shan United (Myanmar)	0–5	(Philippines) Ceres–Negros	Yangon
15:30 UTC+6:30		Live Report; Stats Report	Marañón 38', 43' (pen.), 71'; De Murga 80'; Porteria 85'	Stadium: Thuwunna Stadium; Attendance: 420; Referee: Liu Kwok Man (Hong Kong)

May 15, 2019 Matchday 6	Ceres–Negros (Philippines)	0–1	(Vietnam) Becamex Bình Dương	Bacolod
20:00 UTC+8		Live Report; Stats Report	Luiz 88'	Stadium: Panaad Park and Stadium; Attendance: 5,347; Referee: Kim Dae-yong (South Korea)

==== ASEAN Zonal Semifinal ====
June 18, 2019 First leg	Ceres–Negros (Philippines)	1–1	(Vietnam) Hà Nội	Bacolod
19:30 UTC+8	Marañón 57'	Live Report; Stats Report	Faye 67'	Stadium: Panaad Park and Stadium; Attendance: 6,007; Referee: Aziz Asimov (Uzbekistan)

June 25, 2019 Second leg	Hà Nội (Vietnam)	2–1 (3–2 agg.)	(Philippines) Ceres–Negros	Hanoi
15:30 UTC+6:30	Faye 59'; Nguyễn Văn Quyết 64'	Live Report; Stats Report	Dizon 85'	Stadium: Hàng Đẫy Stadium; Attendance: 4,839; Referee: Yu Ming-hsun (Chinese Taipei)

Hà Nội won 3–2 on aggregate.
