= 2019 Copa Paulino Alcantara final =

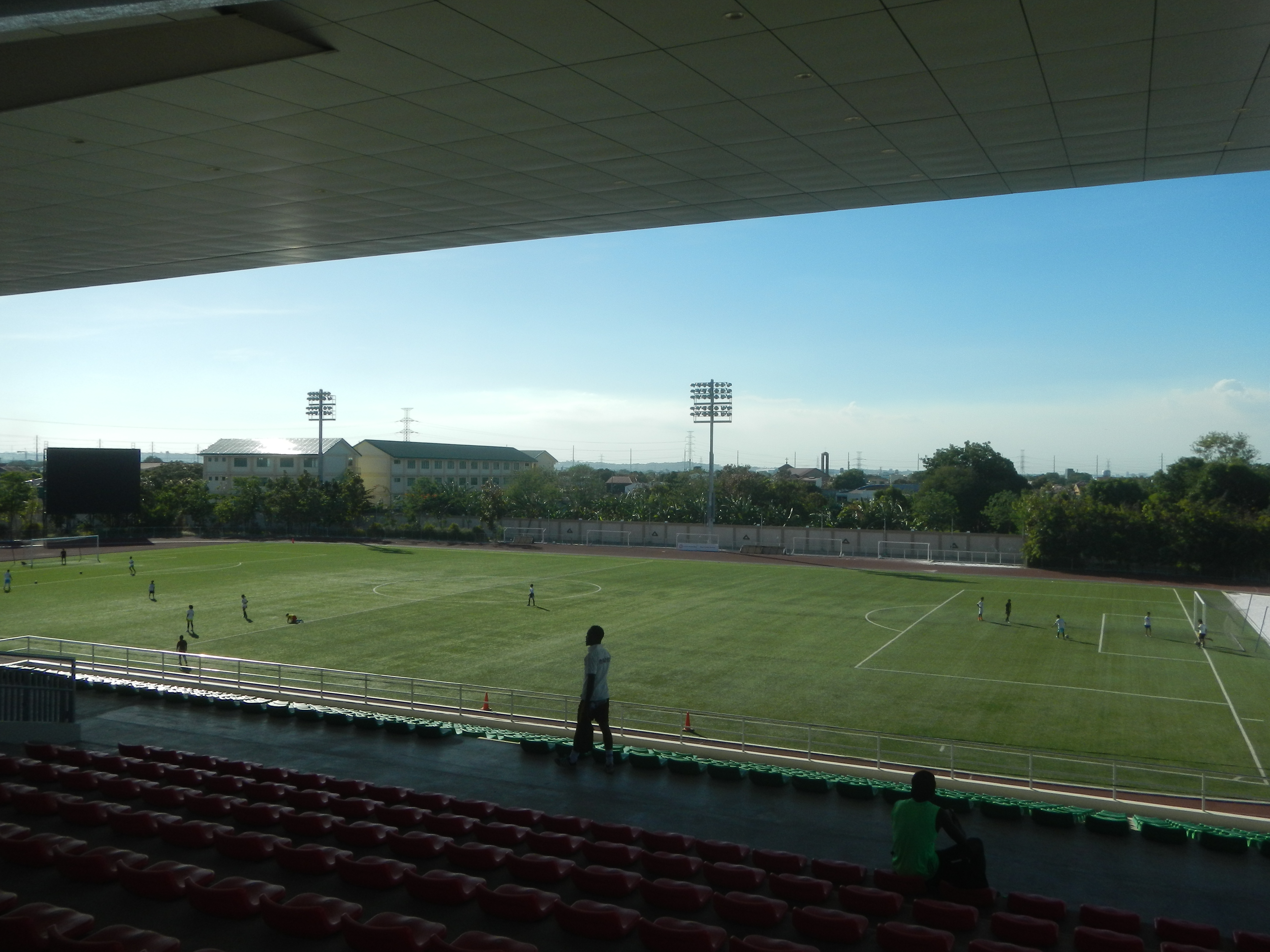
- Biñan Football Stadium, the venue of the final.
- Event: 2019 Copa Paulino Alcantara
Ceres–Negros	Kaya–Iloilo
2	1
- Date: 16 November 2019
- Venue: Biñan Football Stadium, Biñan
- Referee: Clifford Daypuyat
- Attendance: 736

The final of the second season of the Copa Paulino Alcantara will be contested by Ceres–Negros and Kaya F.C.–Iloilo on 16 November 2019 on neutral ground at the Biñan Football Stadium in Biñan.

== Background ==
Kaya F.C.–Iloilo are the defending champions of the Copa Paulino Alcantara having won the inaugural tournament in 2018 while Ceres–Negros are the league champions for the 2019 season. Both teams topped their groups in the group stage and advances to the semifinals. This marks the first time Ceres-Negros advances to the knockout stages after failing to do so in the previous tournament. Ceres-Negros overcame Stallion Laguna 4–3 away from home at the Biñan Football Stadium while Kaya–Iloilo won 3–0 over Mendiola at the Aboitiz Pitch in Lipa, Batangas to secure a berth in the final. Kaya–Iloilo also secured the second slot for Philippine clubs at the 2020 AFC Cup since their final opponents already clinched the first by winning the league title.

The final will be held 16 November 2019 on neutral ground at the Biñan Football Stadium in Biñan, Laguna. Ceres–Negros enters the final with a 28-match undefeated streak when league matches also taken into account.

== Route to the final ==
Ceres–Negros		Round	Kaya-Iloilo	
Opponent	Result	Group stage	Opponent	Result
Mendiola	2–2	Matchday 1	Philippine Air Force	5–0
Philippines U22	2–1	Matchday 2	Stallion Laguna	1–1
Green Archers United	4–0	Matchday 3		
Group A winners: Pos / Team / Pld / Pts; 1 / Ceres–Negros / 3 / 7; 2 / Mendiola / 3 / 5; 3 / Philippines U22 / 3 / 4; 4 / Green Archers United / 3 / 0; Source: PFL		Final standings	Group B winners: Pos / Team / Pld / Pts; 1 / Kaya–Iloilo / 2 / 4; 2 / Stallion Laguna / 2 / 4; 3 / Philippine Air Force / 2 / 0; Source: PFL	
Opponent	Result	Knockout phase	Opponent	Result
Stallion Laguna	4–3	Semi-finals	Mendiola	3–0

== Match summary ==
External videos
- 2019 Copa Paulino Alcantara Final
- Copa Paulino Alcantara Final 2019 by the Philippines Football League

The 2019 Copa Paulino Alcantara final was contested in the Biñan Football Stadium in Biñan, Laguna. At the time of the final, Ceres-Negros were considered the underdogs as majority of their first-team players (Carli de Murga, Mike Ott, Sean Kane, Jose Elmer Porteria and Stephan Schröck) were on international duty for the Philippine national team in the 2022 Fifa World Cup qualifiers, trimming the squad size down to 14. Kaya–Iloilo, on the other hand, had a full-strength squad and were also the defending champions, having won the 2018 Copa Paulino Alcantara, and were looking for revenge after Ceres beat them 3–0 on the last matchday of the 2019 Philippines Football League season.

The match was an even affair with both sides having equal possession of the ball until Senegalese forward Robert Lopez Mendy struck off a deflection from Louie Casas. Kaya then had majority of possession, with Jovin Bedic, Jordan Mintah, and Kenshiro Daniels coming close to finding the back of the net. The half ended 1–0 in favor of Ceres. In the 2nd half, Kaya retained much of the possession but a slick pass from Mendy found Negros-born Tristan Robles, who finished in the 68th minute. Kaya's Copa top scorer Kenshiro Daniels found the back of the net in the 85th minute to reduce the scoreline to 2–1. Kaya pushed for an equalizer but could not find the back of the net.

The match ended in a 2–1 in favor of Ceres-Negros. By doing so, they completed the first-ever "Invincibles" domestic season in the Philippine Professional Football era. However, since they already qualified for the 2020 AFC Cup by winning the 2019 Philippines Football League, Kaya-Iloilo qualified as they were runners-up in both competitions. Stallion Laguna by being 3rd place in the 2019 Philippines Football League season qualify as a standby team should Ceres get through to the 2020 AFC Champions League group stage.

Ceres Negros also clinched all three individual awards of the tournament: Robert Mendy won the Golden Boot by scoring five goals in the whole tournament, Roland Muller was awarded the Golden Glove, and Takashi Odawara the Golden Ball award.

16 November 2019
17:00 UTC+8

Ceres–Negros	2–1	Kaya–Iloilo
Lopez Mendy 30'; Robles 68'		Daniels 85'

Biñan Football Stadium, Biñan
Referee: Clifford Daypuyat

Ceres–Negros	Kaya–Iloilo

GK	22	(Philippines) Roland Müller (c)
	30	(Philippines) Angélo Marasigan
	13	(Philippines) Dennis Villanueva
	16	(Philippines) Dylan de Bruycker
	23	(Philippines) James Younghusband
	17	(Philippines) Junior Muñoz
	18	(Philippines) Joshua Dutosme
	8	(Philippines) Miguel Tanton
	71	(Senegal) Robert Lopez Mendy
	9	(Japan) Takashi Odawara
	11	(Philippines) Tristan Robles
Substitutes:
	6	(Philippines) Charles Barberan
GK	24	(Philippines) Florencio Badelic Jr.
GK	25	(Philippines) Ronilo Bayan Jr.
Head Coach:
(Serbia) Risto Vidaković

GK	25	(Philippines) Louie Casas
	6	(Philippines) Jalsor Soriano
	4	(Japan) Masanari Omura
	44	(Philippines) Audie Menzi
	3	(Philippines) Chy Villaseñor
	30	(Trinidad and Tobago) Darryl Roberts
	16	(Ghana) Alfred Osei
	12	(Philippines) Jayson Panhay
	7	(Philippines) Jovin Bedic (c)
	21	(Philippines) Kenshiro Daniels
	28	(Ghana) Jordan Mintah
Substitutes:
GK	1	(Philippines) Nathanael Villanueva
	5	(Philippines) Camelo Tacusalme
	29	(Philippines) Connor Tacagni
	8	(Philippines) Marwin Angeles
	19	(Philippines) Eric Giganto
	18	(Philippines) Arnie Pasinabo
Head Coach:
(Philippines) Noel Marcaida
