= Súper =

Spanish footballer

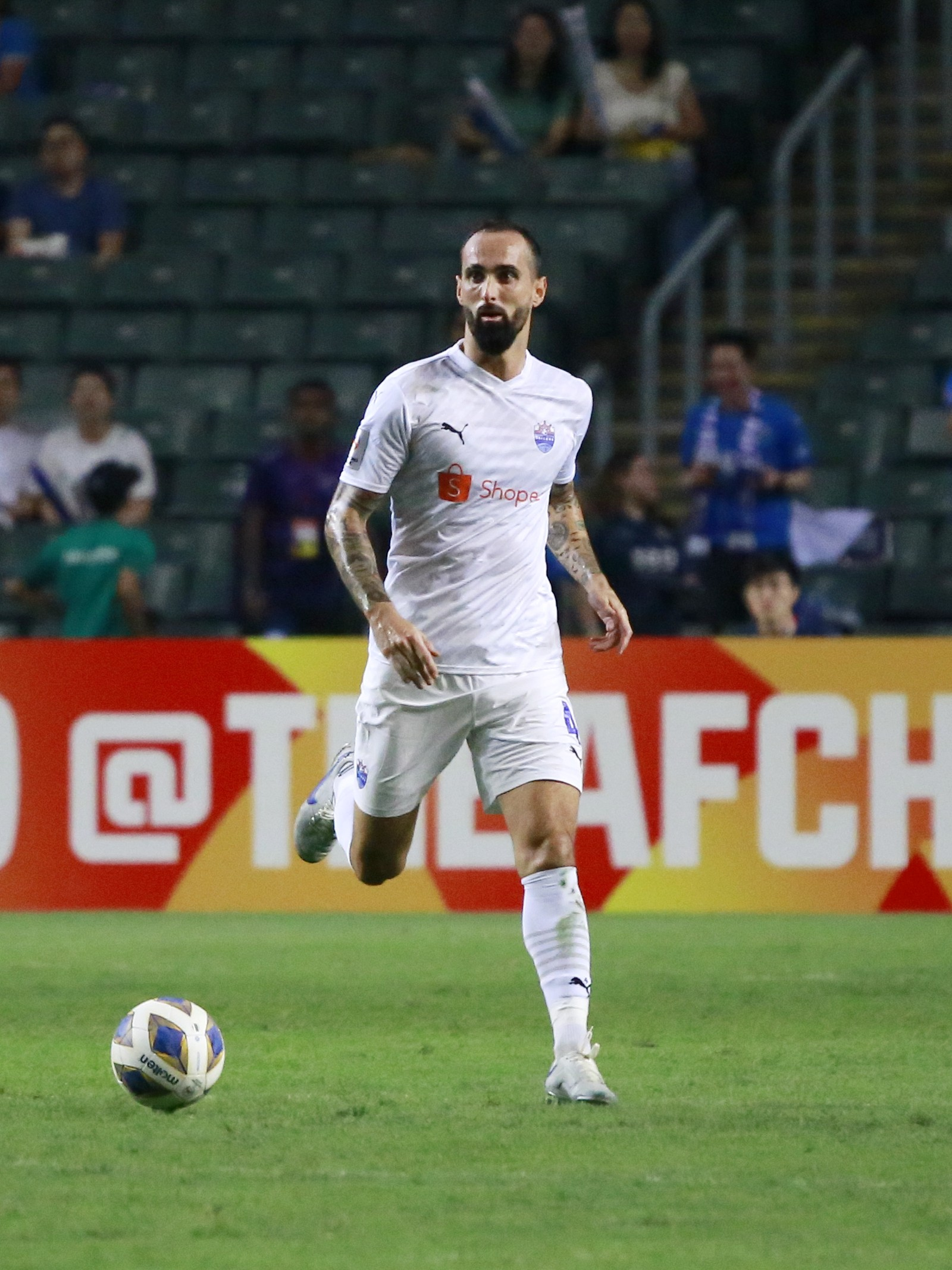
- Súper playing for Lion City Sailors during the 2023–24 AFC Champions League match fixtures against Kitchee

Personal information
- Full name: Manuel Herrera López
- Date of birth: 21 November 1991 (age 34)
- Place of birth: Seville, Spain
- Height: 1.82 m (5 ft 11 1/2 in)
- Position: Centre-back

Youth career
- Betis

Senior career*
Years	Team	Apps	(Gls)
2010–2011	Betis C	1	(0)
2011–2013	Betis B	72	(5)
2013–2014	Elche B	1	(0)
2014	Cartagena	13	(0)
2014–2015	San Roque	29	(2)
2015–2016	Villanovense	11	(1)
2016–2017	Caudal	25	(4)
2017–2020	Ceres-Negros	53	(2)
2020	Lanzarote	4	(0)
2021–2022	Nagaworld	33	(1)
2023	Lion City Sailors	9	(1)
2024–2025	Sangiustese VP		
2025	Puente Genil	6	(0)
- * Club domestic league appearances and goals as of 11 May 2025

Manuel Herrera López (born 21 November 1991), also known as Súper, is a Spanish professional footballer who plays as a centre-back.

He started his career in the youth and reserve teams of Real Betis and later played for clubs in the Segunda División B. He then played for Filipino club Ceres–Negros where he won three consecutive league titles.

== Club career ==
Born in Seville, Andalusia, Súper graduated from the youth academy of Real Betis, and reached the reserves midway through the 2010–11 season. He made his debut in Segunda División B on 2 January 2011, coming on as a second-half substitute in a 2–2 home draw against Lucena CF.

=== Real Betis B ===
On 9 March 2012, Súper was called to the first team by manager Pepe Mel for a La Liga match against Real Madrid, but he remained on the bench in the 2–3 home loss the following day. After leaving the Estadio Benito Villamarín he continued to compete in the third level, representing in quick succession Elche CF Ilicitano, FC Cartagena, CD San Roque de Lepe and CF Villanovense.

=== Caudal Deportivo ===
Súper signed with Tercera División club Caudal Deportivo in the last minutes of the 2016 winter transfer window. He appeared in 16 matches across all competitions in his debut campaign (including the play-offs), helping to promotion. On 10 December 2017, he was released.

=== Ceres–Negros ===
On 31 December 2016, Súper moved abroad for the first time as he joined Ceres-Negros of the Philippines Football League (PFL). He was recruited by the club's coach, Risto Vidaković, who was his former coach at Betis B. Súper headed the consolation goal in their 2–1 PFL defeat by Meralco Manila on 16 August 2017. Ceres ended the season as winners of the PFL's inaugural title. He also played in the 2017 AFC Cup. In the 2018 AFC Cup group match against Home United, he headed the equalising goal from Manny Ott's corner kick, forcing a 1–1 draw.

In the first leg of the ASEAN zonal semifinal, he contributed a goal in their 4–2 win over Yangon United. In the 2018 PFL, Ceres successfully defended their title. Súper was part of the squad that won the 2019 domestic double without a single defeat. He scored the first goal in their 3–0 win over Philippine Air Force on 17 August. He last played for Ceres in the 2020 AFC Cup as tournaments were suspended or cancelled due to the COVID-19 pandemic. The financial impact of the pandemic forced the club to terminate its players' contracts. After a change in ownership, majority of the Ceres players re-signed but Súper did not.

=== UD Lanzarote ===
In September 2020, Súper returned to Spain and joined UD Lanzarote of the Tercera División's Group 12 (Canary Islands).

=== Nagaworld ===
In 2021, Súper signed for Nagaworld of the Cambodian Premier League on a two years contract.

=== Lion City Sailors ===
On 14 March 2023, Súper reunited with his former coach, Risto Vidaković for the third time and signed for Singapore Premier League club, Lion City Sailors. He scored his first goal with the club in a 4–3 league defeat to Tampines Rovers. On 9 December 2023, Súper helped the club to win the 2023 Singapore Cup.

== Career statistics ==
As of match played on 25 April 2018

Club	Season	League			Cup		Other		Total	
Club	Season	Division	Apps	Goals	Apps	Goals	Apps	Goals	Apps	Goals
Betis C	2010–11	Primera División Andalucía	1	0	—		—		1	0
Betis B	2010–11	Segunda División B	20	0	—		1 (Note: Appearance in Relegation Play-off)	0	21	0
Betis B	2011–12	Segunda División B	32	3	—		—		32	3
Betis B	2012–13	Segunda División B	20	2	—		—		20	2
Betis B	Total		72	5	—		1	0	73	5
Elche B	2013–14	Segunda División B	1	0	—		—		1	0
Cartagena	2013–14	Segunda División B	13	0	0	0	1 (Note: Appearances in Promotion Play-off)	0	14	0
San Roque	2014–15	Segunda División B	29	2	1	0	—		30	2
Villanovense	2015–16	Segunda División B	11	1	2	0	—		13	1
Caudal	2015–16	Tercera División	12	3	0	0	4	0	16	3
Caudal	2016–17	Segunda División B	13	1	2	0	—		15	1
Caudal	Total		25	4	2	0	4	0	31	4
Ceres Negros	2017	Philippines Football League			1	0	10 (Note: Appearances in AFC Cup)	1	11	1
Ceres Negros	2018	Philippines Football League			0	0	8 (Note: Appearances in AFC Cup and AFC Champions League)	1	8	1
Ceres Negros	Total				1	0	18	2	19	2
Lion City Sailors	2023	Singapore Premier League	9	1	0	0	0	0	9	1
Lion City Sailors	Total		9	1	0	0	0	0	9	1
Career total			163	13	6	0	24	2	193	15

== Honours ==
Ceres–Negros

- Philippines Football League: 2017, 2018, 2019
- Copa Paulino Alcantara: 2019

=== Lion City Sailors ===
- Singapore Cup: 2023
