= Aboitiz =

Aboitiz may refer to:

- Jon Ramon Aboitiz (1948–2018), Filipino businessman
- Aboitiz Equity Ventures, a Philippine holding company
- Aboitiz Air, a defunct Filipino airline
- Aboitiz Football Cup, a football competition held in Cebu, Philippines
