= Bienvenido Marañón =

Filipino footballer (born 1986)

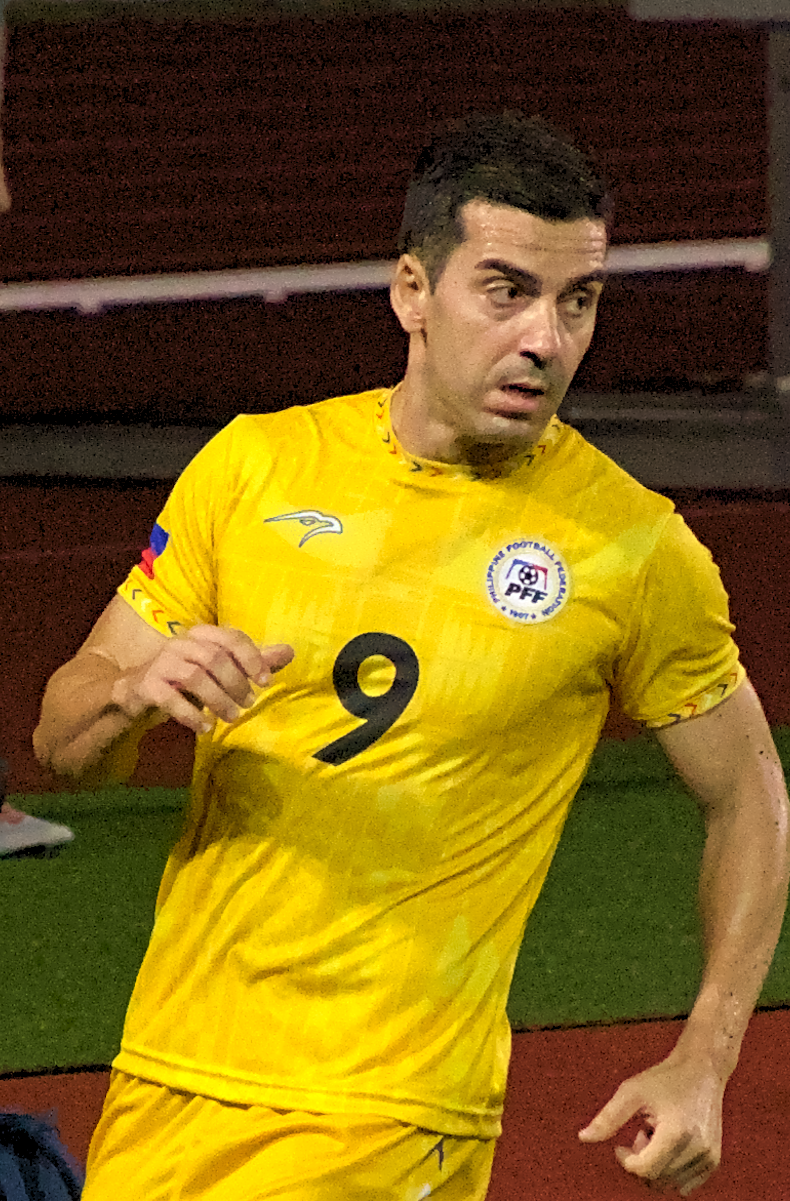
- Marañón playing for Philippines in 2023

Personal information
- Full name: Bienvenido Morejón Marañón
- Date of birth: May 15, 1986 (age 40)
- Place of birth: El Puerto de Santa María, Spain
- Height: 1.73 m (5 ft 8 in)
- Positions: Forward; winger

Team information
- Current team: Chanthaburi
- Number: 10

Youth career
- La Salle
- –2005: Betis

Senior career*
Years	Team	Apps	(Gls)
2005–2007	Rayo Sanluqueño		
2007–2010	Cádiz B	86	(28)
2007–2008	Cádiz	3	(0)
2010–2011	Villarrubia	37	(21)
2011–2012	Móstoles	14	(1)
2012	Villarrubia	14	(11)
2012–2013	La Hoya Lorca	27	(14)
2013–2015	Socuéllamos	65	(15)
2015–2022	Ceres–Negros / United City	59	(74)
2022	Johor Darul Ta'zim II	9	(3)
2022–2023	Villarrubia	20	(3)
2023–2025	Chanthaburi	61	(8)

International career^{‡}
2021–	Philippines	15	(4)
- * Club domestic league appearances and goals as of 5 June 2025 ‡ National team caps and goals as of 23 November 2023

Bienvenido Morejón Marañón (Note: Can also be arranged in the Spanish naming order as "Bienvenido Marañón Morejón". The first or paternal surname is Marañón and the second or maternal family name is Morejón.) ([bjem.beˈni.ðo maɾaˈɲon]; born May 15, 1986), also known as Bienve, is a professional footballer who last played as a forward or a winger for Thai League 2 club Chanthaburi. Born in Spain, he represents the Philippines national team.

== Early life ==
Bienve was born in El Puerto de Santa María, Province of Cádiz, Andalusia, and grew up in neighbouring Cádiz. He spent his childhood playing football in the streets, as his parents could not afford to send him to an academy.

== Club career ==
=== Spain ===
Bienve made his senior debut when he was in Spain with local club CD Rayo Sanluqueño in the 2005–06 season. In the third quarter of 2007 he signed with Cádiz CF, being assigned to the reserves in Tercera División.

On December 2, 2007, Bienve appeared in his first game as a professional, coming on as a late substitute in a 3–1 home win against Racing de Ferrol in the Segunda División. He totalled 58 minutes for the first team, who were eventually relegated.

On April 7, 2010, Bienve was released by Cádiz due to indiscipline. He joined fourth-level club Villarrubia CF 14 days later, and scored a career-best 21 goals during the campaign.

Bienve moved to fellow league team CD Móstoles in the 2011 off-season, returning to Villarrubia the following transfer window and subsequently resuming his career in the fourth tier, where he represented La Hoya Lorca CF and UD Socuéllamos. With the latter, he achieved promotion to Segunda División B in 2014.

=== Ceres–Negros / United City ===
On May 14, 2015, Bienve moved abroad for the first time in his career, after agreeing a deal with Filipino United Football League side Ceres FC. He was encouraged by former Cádiz teammate Carli de Murga to play for them as early as 2012. After one month at the club, he was not satisfied with his performance and decided to study Chieffy Caligdong's style of play in a bid to improve himself.

Bienve considered retiring in 2016 due to the death of his father but was encouraged by coach Risto Vidaković to continue playing football. He became the all-time top scorer in the AFC Cup on 11 March 2020, when he scored his 35th goal in the renamed Ceres–Negros's 4–0 win against Bali United FC.

Ceres–Negros was taken over by a new management in July 2020, being renamed United City FC. Bienve was among the players retained. He would leave the club by January 5, 2022.

=== Johor Darul Ta'zim ===
Marañon joined Johor Darul Ta'zim of the Malaysia Super League by January 20, 2022.

== International career ==
Marañón originally was not eligible to play for the Philippine national team prior to receiving Filipino citizenship in 2020 via naturalization. On March 3, 2020, Philippine Senator Migz Zubiri sponsored a Senate bill proposing to grant Filipino citizenship to Marañón, which would make him eligible for the Philippines national team. In September, bills were filed in the House of Representatives proposing the same. Those were approved on February 16, 2021, while the corresponding Senate bill was approved on March 15. On July 2, Marañón became a Filipino citizen when the bill was signed into law as Republic Act No. 11570 by President Rodrigo Duterte.

Marañón was first called up to play for the Philippine national team for the 2020 AFF Championship, which was postponed by a year due to the COVID-19 pandemic. He debuted for the Philippines in a 1–2 loss against hosts Singapore during the tournament's first matchday on December 8, 2021. During the second matchday against Timor-Leste on December 11, Marañón scored his first international goal by scoring the sixth goal of a 7–0 win for the Philippines.

== Personal life ==
Marañón is of Basque ethnicity. His Basque grandfather also had links to the Philippines, having fled from Spain to settle in the Western Visayas due to his opposition to Spanish dictator Francisco Franco.

== Career statistics ==
=== Club ===
As of 7 August 2022

Appearances and goals by club, season and competition
Club	Season	League			Cup		Continental		Other		Total	
Club	Season	Division	Apps	Goals	Apps	Goals	Apps	Goals	Apps	Goals	Apps	Goals
Ceres–Negros	2017	Philippines Football League	25	22	–		12	8	1	0	38	30
Ceres–Negros	2018	Philippines Football League	11	15	2	0	11	12	–		24	27
Ceres–Negros	2019	Philippines Football League	20	30	2	0	9	10	–		31	40
Ceres–Negros	2020	Philippines Football League	5	7	–		6	6	–		11	13
Ceres–Negros	2021	Philippines Football League	–		–		5	1	–		5	1
Johor Darul Ta'zim	2022	Malaysia Super League	9	3	1	0	1	0	–		11	3
Career total			70	77	5	0	44	37	1	0	120	114

=== International ===
Scores and results list the Philippines' goal tally first, score column indicates score after each Marañón goal.

List of international goals scored by Bienvenido Marañón
No.	Date	Venue	Opponent	Score	Result	Competition
1	11 December 2021	National Stadium, Kallang, Singapore	Timor-Leste	6–0	7–0	2020 AFF Championship
2	18 December 2021	Bishan Stadium, Bishan, Singapore	Myanmar	1–0	3–2	2020 AFF Championship
3	18 December 2021	Bishan Stadium, Bishan, Singapore	Myanmar	2–0	3–2	2020 AFF Championship
4	18 December 2021	Bishan Stadium, Bishan, Singapore	Myanmar	3–0	3–2	2020 AFF Championship

=== Ceres Negros/United City ===
No.	Date	Venue	Opponent	Score	Result	Competition
1.	12 April 2016	Bacolod, Philippines	(Singapore) Tampines Rovers	1–0	2–1	2016 AFC Cup
2.	10 May 2016	Bacolod, Philippines	(Bangladesh) Sheikh Jamal Dhanmondi	1–0	5–0	2016 AFC Cup
3.	21 February 2017	Hanoi, Vietnam	(Vietnam) Hà Nội	1–0	1–1	2017 AFC Cup
4.	7 March 2017	Bacolod, Philippines	(Singapore) Tampines Rovers	2–0	5–0	2017 AFC Cup
5.	7 March 2017	Bacolod, Philippines	(Singapore) Tampines Rovers	4–0	5–0	2017 AFC Cup
6.	19 April 2017	Bacolod, Philippines	(Vietnam) Hà Nội	1–0	6–2	2017 AFC Cup
7.	19 April 2017	Bacolod, Philippines	(Vietnam) Hà Nội	6–2	6–2	2017 AFC Cup
8.	3 May 2017	Jalan Besar, Singapore	(Singapore) Tampines Rovers	1–0	4–2	2017 AFC Cup
9.	3 May 2017	Jalan Besar, Singapore	(Singapore) Tampines Rovers	2–0	4–2	2017 AFC Cup
10.	17 May 2017	Johor Bahru, Malaysia	(Malaysia) Johor Darul Ta'zim	2–1	2–3	2017 AFC Cup
11.	23 January 2018	Brisbane, Australia	(Australia) Brisbane Roar	1–1	3–2	2018 AFC Champions League preliminary round 2
12.	23 January 2018	Brisbane, Australia	(Australia) Brisbane Roar	2–1	3–2	2018 AFC Champions League preliminary round 2
13.	13 February 2018	Bacolod, Philippines	(Cambodia) Boeung Ket Angkor	2–0	9–0	2018 AFC Cup
14.	13 February 2018	Bacolod, Philippines	(Cambodia) Boeung Ket Angkor	4–0	9–0	2018 AFC Cup
15.	6 March 2018	Bacolod, Philippines	(Myanmar) Shan United	2–0	2–0	2018 AFC Cup
16.	14 March 2018	Yangon, Myanmar	(Myanmar) Shan United	1–0	1–0	2018 AFC Cup
17.	11 April 2018	Phnom Penh, Cambodia	(Cambodia) Boeung Ket Angkor	1–0	4–0	2018 AFC Cup
18.	11 April 2018	Phnom Penh, Cambodia	(Cambodia) Boeung Ket Angkor	2–0	4–0	2018 AFC Cup
19.	11 April 2018	Phnom Penh, Cambodia	(Cambodia) Boeung Ket Angkor	3–0	4–0	2018 AFC Cup
20.	9 May 2018	Bacolod, Philippines	(Myanmar) Yangon United	1–0	4–2	2018 AFC Cup
21.	9 May 2018	Bacolod, Philippines	(Myanmar) Yangon United	3–0	4–2	2018 AFC Cup
22.	16 May 2018	Yangon, Myanmar	(Myanmar) Yangon United	2–1	2–3	2018 AFC Cup
23.	26 February 2019	Bacolod, Philippines	(Myanmar) Shan United	2–0	3–2	2019 AFC Cup
24.	12 March 2019	Thủ Dầu Một, Vietnam	(Vietnam) Becamex Bình Dương	1–0	3–1	2019 AFC Cup
25.	12 March 2019	Thủ Dầu Một, Vietnam	(Vietnam) Becamex Bình Dương	2–1	3–1	2019 AFC Cup
26.	12 March 2019	Thủ Dầu Một, Vietnam	(Vietnam) Becamex Bình Dương	3–1	3–1	2019 AFC Cup
27.	3 April 2019	Bacolod, Philippines	(Indonesia) Persija Jakarta	1–0	1–0	2019 AFC Cup
28.	23 April 2019	Jakarta, Indonesia	(Indonesia) Persija Jakarta	2–2	3–2	2019 AFC Cup
29.	1 May 2019	Yangon, Myanmar	(Myanmar) Shan United	1–0	5–0	2019 AFC Cup
30.	1 May 2019	Yangon, Myanmar	(Myanmar) Shan United	2–0	5–0	2019 AFC Cup
31.	1 May 2019	Yangon, Myanmar	(Myanmar) Shan United	3–0	5–0	2019 AFC Cup
32.	18 June 2019	Bacolod, Philippines	(Vietnam) Hà Nội	1–0	1–1	2019 AFC Cup
33.	14 January 2020	Manila, Philippines	(Myanmar) Shan United	2–0	3–2	2020 AFC Champions League preliminary round 1
34.	11 February 2020	Manila, Philippines	(Cambodia) Svay Rieng	3–0	4–0	2020 AFC Cup
35.	11 February 2020	Manila, Philippines	(Cambodia) Svay Rieng	4–0	4–0	2020 AFC Cup
36.	25 February 2020	Manila, Philippines	(Vietnam) Than Quảng Ninh	1–1	2–2	2020 AFC Cup
37.	11 March 2020	Manila, Philippines	(Indonesia) Bali United	2–0	4–0	2020 AFC Cup
38.	11 March 2020	Manila, Philippines	(Indonesia) Bali United	3–0	4–0	2020 AFC Cup
39.	8 July 2021	Tashkent, Uzbekistan	(China) Beijing Guoan	2–2	2–3	2021 AFC Champions League

== Honours ==
Ceres–Negros/United City

- Philippines Football League: 2017, 2018, 2019, 2020
- Copa Paulino Alcantara: 2019

Individual

- AFC Cup top goalscorer: 2019, 2020
- Philippines Football League Golden Boot: 2020
- AFF Championship joint top scorer: 2020
