= 2019 Philippines Football League =

3rd season of the Philippines Football League

Philippines Football League
- Season: 2019
- Dates: May 25 – October 19, 2019
- Champions: Ceres–Negros; 3rd title
- AFC Champions League: Ceres–Negros
- AFC Cup: Kaya–Iloilo
- Matches: 84
- Goals: 322 (3.83 per match)
- Top goalscorer: Jordan Mintah (31 goals)
- Best goalkeeper: Roland Müller (10 clean sheets)
- Biggest home win: Ceres–Negros 12–0 Philippine Air Force (July 13)
- Biggest away win: Global Cebu 0–13 Ceres–Negros (August 28)
- Highest scoring: Global Cebu 0–13 Ceres–Negros (August 28)
- Longest winning run: Ceres–Negros (May 29 – Sept 28) (17 matches)
- Longest unbeaten run: Ceres–Negros (May 25 – Oct 19) (24 matches)
- Longest winless run: Global Cebu (June 29 – Oct 19) (20 matches)
- Longest losing run: Philippine Air Force (Sep 25 – Oct 19) (7 matches)
- Highest attendance: 906; Philippine Air Force 1–2 Kaya–Iloilo (September 22)
- All statistics correct as of October 12, 2019.

The 2019 Philippines Football League was the third season of the Philippines Football League (PFL), the professional football league of the Philippines. Ceres–Negros are the defending champions. This marks the revival of the Philippines Football League as the league folded after the 2018 season to give way for the Philippine Premier League, intended as a successor league to the PFL, which proved to be short-lived.

The 2019 season started on May 25, 2019, and ended on October 19, 2019.

Ceres–Negros won their second title on October 12, 2019, by winning over Green Archers United 3–1 with two matches to spare. On October 19, 2019, Ceres beat rivals Kaya–Iloilo 3–0 to complete the first 3-peat in PFL History and by doing so got their 22nd PFL victory, leading them to the first invincibles this season.

== Teams ==
Seven teams participated in the 2019 season, including three debutants, Green Archers, Mendiola, and Philippine Air Force.

Team	Location	Stadium	Capacity
Ceres Negros	Bacolod	Panaad Stadium (Note: While the Panaad Stadium is the designated home venue of Ceres Negros, no PFL match was played at the stadium for the 2019 season.)	9,825
Green Archers United	Lipa, Batangas	Aboitiz Pitch	1,500
Global Cebu (Note: Referred to as Global Cebu, the club's old name, by the Philippine Football League in official league communications due to licensing issues, the club refers to itself as Global Makati and the crest present on the team's actual kits uses the Makati name.)	Cebu City	Cebu City Sports Complex (Note: As Global Makati, the club had nominated the University of Makati Stadium as their home venue. However, no PFL match was played at the venue due to the club's licensing issues.)	
Kaya–Iloilo	Iloilo City	Iloilo Sports Complex	7,000
Mendiola 1991	—N/a		
Philippine Air Force	—N/a		
Stallion Laguna	Biñan, Laguna	Biñan Football Stadium	2,580

=== Personnel and kits ===
Team	Head coach	Captain	Kit manufacturer	Sponsors
Ceres–Negros	(Serbia) Risto Vidaković	(Philippines) Carli de Murga	(Thailand) Grand Sport	Ceres Liner
Global Cebu	(United States) Andrew Piesse	(Philippines) Jerry Barbaso	(Philippines) Chronos Athletics	MMC Sportz, Aquafalls Water Station
Green Archers United	(Philippines) Joel Villarino	(Philippines) Tating Pasilan	(Philippines) Cutz Apparel	Globe Telecom, Orient Freight International
Kaya–Iloilo	(Philippines) Noel Marcaida	(Philippines) Jovin Bedic	(Germany) Adidas	LBC, Fitness First
Mendiola 1991	(Philippines) Dan Padernal	(Philippines) Aron Altiche	(Indonesia) FAT	Gulf Oil Philippines
Philippine Air Force	(Philippines) Leo Jaena	(Philippines) Yanti Barsales	(Philippines) Defy Athletics	Elan Vita
Stallion Laguna	(Philippines) Ernest Nierras	(Philippines) Ruben Doctora	(South Korea) Nassau	Giligan's Restaurant

== Foreign players ==
A maximum of four foreigners are allowed per club which follows the Asian Football Confederation's (AFC) '3+1 rule'; three players of any nationality and a fourth coming from an AFC member nation.

Players name in bold indicates the player was registered during the mid-season transfer window.

Club	Players				Former Players^{1}
Ceres–Negros	(Senegal) **Robert Lopez Mendy**	(Japan) **Takashi Odawara**	(Spain) Bienvenido Marañón	(Spain) Súper	(Bosnia and Herzegovina) Mahir Karić (Australia) Blake Powell
Global Cebu	(Nigeria) Kenneth Obananaya	(Nigeria) Anthony Okoh	(Nigeria) Emmanuel Otuyemi		
Green Archers United	(Ghana) **Stephen Appiah**	(Cameroon) Henri Bandeken	(South Korea) Kim Hyun-kyoon	(Cameroon) Freddy Mbang	(Cameroon) Joel Okono
Kaya–Iloilo	(Ghana) Jordan Mintah	(Japan) Masanari Omura	(Ghana) Alfred Osei	(Trinidad and Tobago) Darryl Roberts	
Mendiola 1991	(Iran) Hamed Hajimehdi	(Cameroon) **Souleyman Ndepe**	(Ivory Coast) **Dini Ouattara**	(Argentina) **Ricardo Sendra**	
Philippine Air Force	(Cameroon) **Boris Moundang**	(Cameroon) **Joel Okono**			
Stallion Laguna	(Canada) **Edris Najm**	(South Korea) **Park Jong-cheol**	(Senegal) Abou Sy	(South Korea) **Yu Seungpyo**	(Cameroon) Christian Nana (South Korea) Dong-Hyeon Kim (Sweden) Andoni Suescun

Notes

1. Former players only include players who left after either the start of the 2019 season or the 2019 Copa Paulino Alcantara.

Foreign players by confederation
AFC	Japan (2), South Korea (3), Iran (1)
CAF	Ghana (3), Cameroon (5), Senegal (2), Nigeria (3), Ivory Coast (1)
CONCACAF	Trinidad and Tobago (1), Canada (1)
CONMEBOL	Argentina (1)
UEFA	Spain (2)

== League table ==
Pos	Team	Pld	W	D	L	GF	GA	GD	Pts	Qualification or relegation
1	Ceres–Negros (C)	24	22	2	0	99	12	+87	68	Qualification for AFC Champions League preliminary round 1 (Note: If the league champions cannot qualify for the AFC Champions League group stage, they will enter the AFC Cup group stage.)
2	Kaya–Iloilo	24	18	2	4	60	16	+44	56	Qualification for AFC Cup group stage (Note: Since league champions Ceres–Negros were also Copa Paulino Alcantara winners, the league runners-up qualified for the AFC Cup group stage.)
3	Stallion Laguna	24	11	6	7	54	25	+29	39	
4	Green Archers United	24	10	5	9	42	37	+5	35	
5	Mendiola 1991	24	6	5	13	34	54	−20	23	
6	Philippine Air Force	24	3	2	19	18	85	−67	11	
7	Global Cebu	24	1	4	19	15	92	−77	7	

Source: PFL
Rules for classification: 1) Points; 2) Goal difference; 3) Goals scored
(C) Champions

== Positions by round ==
Team ╲ Round	1	2	3	4	5	6	7	8	9	10	11	12	13	14	15	16	17	18	19	20	21	22	23	24
Ceres–Negros	2	2	2	2	2	1	1	1	1	1	1	1	1	1	1	1	1	1	1	1	1	1	1	1
Kaya–Iloilo	1	1	1	1	1	1	2	2	2	2	2	2	2	2	2	2	2	2	2	2	2	2	2	2
Stallion Laguna	2	5	4	3	4	3	3	3	3	3	3	3	3	3	3	3	3	3	3	3	3	3	3	3
Green Archers United	4	3	3	3	3	4	3	3	4	4	4	4	4	4	4	4	4	4	4	4	4	4	4	4
Mendiola 1991	4	4	5	6	6	5	5	5	5	5	5	5	5	5	5	5	5	5	5	5	5	5	5	5
Philippine Air Force	4	6	5	6	6	7	7	7	7	6	6	6	6	6	6	6	6	6	6	6	6	6	6	6
Global Cebu	4	6	7	5	5	6	6	6	6	6	6	6	7	7	7	7	7	7	7	7	7	7	7	7

AFC Champions League Preliminary Round/AFC Cup Group Stage

Updated to match(es) played on October 12, 2019. Source:

== Results by round ==
Team ╲ Round	1	2	3	4	5	6	7	8	9	10	11	12	13	14	15	16	17	18	19	20	21	22	23	24
Ceres–Negros	D	W	W	W	W	W	W	W	W	W	W	W	W	W	W	W	W	D	W	W	W	W	W	W
Global Cebu	L	L	L	W	L	L	L	L	L	D	L	L	D	L	L	D	D	L	L	L	L	L	L	L
Green Archers United	L	W	W	D	W	L	D	W	L	L	D	W	L	D	W	L	W	D	L	W	W	L	L	W
Kaya-Iloilo	W	W	W	W	W	D	L	W	W	L	W	W	W	W	W	L	W	W	D	W	W	W	W	L
Mendiola 1991	L	D	L	L	L	W	L	W	L	W	L	L	L	D	L	D	D	W	D	L	L	W	W	L
Philippine Air Force	L	L	D	L	L	L	L	L	L	W	L	L	W	L	L	D	L	W	L	L	L	L	L	L
Stallion Laguna	D	L	W	W	D	W	L	W	W	D	W	L	L	D	W	W	D	L	W	D	W	L	L	W

Updated to match(es) played on October 19, 2019. Source:
W = Win; D = Draw; L = Loss

== Results ==
The seven clubs will play each other in two rounds of home and away matches. 84 league matches will be played in total.

=== First round ===
Home \ Away	CER	GAU	KAY	GLC	MEN	PAF	STA
Ceres–Negros	—	2–0	2–1	3–0 (Note: Global forfeited the match due to an inability to form a team. The result is 0-3 in favor of Ceres.)	4–0	12–0	2–2
Green Archers United	3–4	—	0–0	1–0	2–5	4–0	0–0
Kaya–Iloilo	0–1	4–0	—	1–0	5–0	5–0	1–0
Global Cebu	0–8	0–9	0–2	—	0–3 (Note: Global forfeited the match due to an "organizational issue". The result is 0-3 in favor of Mendiola 1991.)	3–1	1–4
Mendiola 1991	2–5	1–5	3–6	4–0	—	1–1	0–1
Philippine Air Force	0–5	0–3	0–5	3–2	1–3	—	0–3
Stallion Laguna	0–2 (Note: Match was cancelled due to unplayable pitch brought by adverse weather conditions in Biñan, Laguna. The Match shall be rescheduled to a later date this month.)	0–0	0–2	5–1	6–1	6–2	—

Updated to match(es) played on September 22, 2019. Source: PFL
Legend: Blue = home team win; Yellow = draw; Red = away team win.

=== Second round ===
Home \ Away	CER	GAU	KAY	GLC	MEN	PAF	STA
Ceres–Negros	—	3–1	2–0	3–0 (Note: Global forfeited the match due to an inability to field a team. The result is 0-3 in favor of Ceres.)	3–0	7–0	5–0
Green Archers United	1–2	—	0–1	1–1	1–0	1–0	0–7
Kaya–Iloilo	0–3	3–1	—	5–1	5–1	5–0	3–1
Global Cebu	0–13	2–2	0–3 (Note: Global forfeited the match due to an organizational issue. The result is 0-3 in favor of Kaya.)	—	1–1	1–1	0–3 (Note: Global forfeited the match due to an "organizational issue". The result is 0-3 in favor of Stallion.)
Mendiola 1991	1–4	1–2	0–0	3–0 (Note: Global forfeited the match due to an inability to field a team. The result is 0-3 in favor of Mendiola 1991.)	—	0–1	0–0
Philippine Air Force	0–3	1–4	1–2	4–1	1–4	—	0–2
Stallion Laguna	1–1	0–1	0–1	9–1	0–0	4–1	—

Updated to match(es) played on October 19, 2019. Source: PFL
Legend: Blue = home team win; Yellow = draw; Red = away team win.

== Season statistics ==
=== Scoring ===
==== Top goalscorers ====
As of October 19, 2019

Rank	Player	Club	Goals
1	(Ghana) Jordan Mintah	Kaya–Iloilo	31
2	(Spain) Bienve Marañón	Ceres–Negros	30
3	(Senegal) Robert Lopez Mendy	Ceres–Negros	17
4	(Philippines) Mike Ott	Ceres–Negros	14
5	(Philippines) Jesus Melliza	Stallion Laguna	11
6	(Philippines) Fitch Arboleda	Stallion Laguna	9
6	(Philippines) Jim Ashley Flores	Mendiola 1991	9
8	(Senegal) Abou Sy	Stallion Laguna	8
9	(Ghana) Stephen Appiah	Green Archers United	7
9	(Philippines) John Celiz	Green Archers United	7

==== Top assists ====
As of October 19, 2019

Rank	Player	Club	Assists
1	(Philippines) Stephan Schröck	Ceres–Negros	21
2	(Spain) Bienve Marañón	Ceres-Negros	10
3	(Philippines) Paolo Bugas	Green Archers United	8
3	(Iran) Hamed Hajimehdi	Mendiola 1991	8
3	(Senegal) Robert Lopez Mendy	Ceres–Negros	8
6	(Philippines) OJ Porteria	Ceres-Negros	7
7	(Ghana) Jordan Mintah	Kaya–Iloilo	6
7	(Trinidad and Tobago) Darryl Roberts	Kaya–Iloilo	6
9	(Philippines) Fitch Arboleda	Stallion Laguna	5
9	(Philippines) Jovin Bedic	Kaya–Iloilo	5
9	(Philippines) Dylan de Bruycker	Ceres-Negros	5
9	(Philippines) Jim Ashley Flores	Mendiola 1991	5
9	(Philippines) Angélo Marasigan	Ceres-Negros	5
9	(Philippines) Jason Panhay	Kaya–Iloilo	5

==== Own goals ====
As of October 16, 2019

Rank	Player	Club	Own goals
1	(Philippines) Carli de Murga	Ceres-Negros	1
1	(Philippines) Resty Gumban	Green Archers United	1
1	(Philippines) James Dorego	Global Cebu	1
1	(Philippines) Aljo Zabala	Mendiola 1991	1
1	(Cameroon) Freddy Mbang	Green Archers United	1

==== Hat-tricks ====
As of October 9, 2019

Player	Club	Result	Against	Date	Ref
(Ghana) Jordan Mintah	Kaya–Iloilo	4–0 (H)	Green Archers United	May 25, 2019	
(Spain) Bienve Marañón	Ceres–Negros	5–0 (A)	Philippine Air Force	May 29, 2019	
(Spain) Bienve Marañón^{4}	Ceres–Negros	8–0 (A)	Global Cebu	June 1, 2019	
(Philippines) Chima Uzoka	Stallion Laguna	6–1 (H)	Mendiola 1991	June 15, 2019	
(Ghana) Jordan Mintah	Kaya–Iloilo	6–3 (A)	Mendiola 1991	June 19, 2019	
(Philippines) Jimuel Ariola	Green Archers United	3–4 (H)	Ceres–Negros	July 3, 2019	
(Spain) Bienve Marañón	Ceres–Negros	12–0 (H)	Philippine Air Force	July 13, 2019	
(Philippines) Stephan Schröck	Ceres–Negros	12–0 (H)	Philippine Air Force	July 13, 2019	
(Philippines) Mike Ott^{4}	Ceres–Negros	12–0 (H)	Philippine Air Force	July 13, 2019	
(Philippines) John Celiz^{4}	Green Archers United	9–0 (A)	Global Cebu	July 14, 2019	
(Philippines) Jim Ashley Flores	Mendiola 1991	5–2 (A)	Green Archers United	July 24, 2019	
(Ghana) Jordan Mintah	Kaya–Iloilo	5–0 (H)	Mendiola 1991	July 27, 2019	
(Senegal) Robert Lopez Mendy^{4}	Ceres-Negros	5–2 (A)	Mendiola 1991	August 10, 2019	
(Senegal) Robert Lopez Mendy	Ceres-Negros	13–0 (A)	Global Cebu	August 28, 2019	
(Spain) Bienve Marañón^{4}	Ceres-Negros	13–0 (A)	Global Cebu	August 28, 2019	
(Philippines) Mike Ott	Ceres-Negros	13–0 (A)	Global Cebu	August 28, 2019	
(Philippines) Fitch Arboleda	Stallion Laguna	7–0 (A)	Green Archers United	August 31, 2019	
(Ghana) Jordan Mintah	Kaya–Iloilo	5–1 (H)	Global Cebu	September 7, 2019	
(Senegal) Robert Lopez Mendy	Ceres-Negros	7–0 (H)	Philippine Air Force	September 14, 2019	
(Ghana) Jordan Mintah^{4}	Kaya–Iloilo	5–0 (H)	Philippine Air Force	September 25, 2019	
(Philippines) Jesus Melliza	Stallion Laguna	9–1 (H)	Global Cebu	September 25, 2019	
(Philippines) Jesus Melliza	Stallion Laguna	4–1 (H)	Philippine Air Force	October 4, 2019	
(Ghana) Jordan Mintah^{4}	Kaya–Iloilo	5–1 (H)	Mendiola 1991	October 9, 2019	

Note

(H) – Home; (A) – Away

^{4} Player scored four goals

=== Clean sheets ===
As of October 19, 2019

Rank	Player	Club	Clean sheets
1	(Philippines) Roland Müller	Ceres-Negros	10
2	(Cameroon) Henri Bandeken	Green Archers United	8
2	(Philippines) Louie Casas	Kaya–Iloilo	8
4	(Ivory Coast) Dini Ouattara	Mendiola 1991	4
4	(Philippines) Nathanael Villanueva	Kaya–Iloilo	4
6	(Philippines) Hayeson Pepito	Stallion Laguna	3
7	(Philippines) Florencio Badelic Jr.	Ceres-Negros	2
7	(Philippines) Ronilo Bayan Jr.	Ceres-Negros	2
7	(Philippines) Patrick Deyto	Stallion Laguna	2
7	(Philippines) Nelson Gasic	Stallion Laguna	2
7	(Philippines) Ray Joyel	Green Archers United	2

=== Discipline ===
==== Red cards ====
As of October 12, 2019

Rank	Player	Club	Red Cards
1	(Cameroon) Freddy Mbang	Green Archers United	2
1	(Ghana) Jordan Mintah	Kaya-Iloilo	2
1	(Philippines) Franco de la Torre	Mendiola 1991	2
1	(Philippines) Kenneth Dolloso	Philippine Air Force	2
5	(Philippines) OJ Porteria	Ceres-Negros	1
5	(Philippines) Resty Gumban	Green Archers United	1
5	(Philippines) Arnel Amita	Kaya-Iloilo	1
5	(Philippines) Benito Rosalia	Stallion Laguna	1
5	(Philippines) Jovin Bedic	Kaya-Iloilo	1
5	(Cameroon) Souleyman Ndepe	Mendiola 1991	1
5	(Philippines) Antonio Albor	Philippine Air Force	1
5	(Philippines) Geve Cadiz	Philippine Air Force	1
5	(Philippines) Sean Kane	Ceres-Negros	1
5	(Spain) Súper	Ceres-Negros	1
5	(Philippines) John Delariarte	Philippine Air Force	1

== Awards ==
The following awards were given at the conclusion of the tournament.

Award	Winner	Club
Golden Ball	(Philippines) Stephan Schröck	Ceres-Negros
Golden Boot	(Ghana) Jordan Mintah	Kaya-Iloilo
Golden Glove	(Philippines) Roland Müller	Ceres-Negros
