= 2018 Philippines Football League =

2nd season of the Philippines Football League

Philippines Football League
- Season: 2018
- Dates: March 3 – August 25, 2018
- Champions: Ceres–Negros; 2nd title
- AFC Champions League: Ceres–Negros
- Matches: 75
- Goals: 289 (3.85 per match)
- Top goalscorer: Robert Lopez Mendy (18 goals)
- Best goalkeeper: Toni Doblas (7 clean sheets)
- Biggest home win: Ceres–Negros 7–1 Global Cebu (July 21); Kaya–Iloilo 6–0 Global Cebu (August 11)
- Biggest away win: Global Cebu 1–11 JPV Marikina (August 1)
- Highest scoring: Global Cebu 1–11 JPV Marikina (August 1)
- Longest winning run: Ceres–Negros (April 4 – May 12) (5 matches)
- Longest unbeaten run: Ceres–Negros (May 23 – June 20); Stallion Laguna (July 14 – Aug 25) (8 matches)
- Longest winless run: Global Cebu (May 27 – Aug 25) (17 matches)
- Longest losing run: Global Cebu (July 21 – Aug 25) (13 matches)
- Highest attendance: 4,681; Ceres–Negros 2–1 Kaya-Iloilo (April 4)
- Lowest attendance: 0 (Behind closed doors); JPV Marikina 1–4 Ceres–Negros (April 28)
- All statistics correct as of August 30, 2018.

The 2018 Philippines Football League was the second season of the Philippines Football League (PFL), the professional football league of the Philippines. The season started on March 3 and concluded on August 25. The league was contested by six teams from last season's eight, after Meralco Manila and Ilocos United withdrew before the season began.

Ceres–Negros won their second consecutive league title on July 25 with three matches to spare.

Due to several issues with the league—such as the expensive home-and-away format as well as the lack of sponsors and TV coverage—the PFL was abolished after the 2018 season and was replaced by the Philippine Premier League. However, the Philippine Premier League also had numerous issues and was folded after only a single match day. The PFL was then renewed for a third season in 2019.

== Changes from 2017 ==
For this season, the league discontinued the play-off final, or the Final Series due to the introduction of the Copa Paulino Alcantara, the domestic cup tournament which was held after the league season. Thus, the PFL became a pure quintuple round-robin tournament where each club played the others five times—each club playing 25 games.

== Teams ==
The eight clubs which participated in the inaugural season were granted license to partake in the 2018 season by November 2017. However, on January 8, 2018, FC Meralco Manila ceased operations in the senior club level and on January 18 Ilocos United F.C. announced their withdrawal from the league leaving only 6 teams for the 2018 season.

=== Stadiums and locations ===
On February 6, 2018, Kaya F.C. transferred from Makati to Iloilo.

Team	Location	Stadium	Capacity
Ceres–Negros	Bacolod	Panaad Stadium	8,000
Davao Aguilas	Tagum, Davao del Norte	Davao del Norte Sports Complex	3,000
Global Cebu	Cebu City	Cebu City Sports Complex	
JPV Marikina	Marikina, Metro Manila	Marikina Sports Complex	15,000
Kaya–Iloilo (Kaya–Makati; until April 2018)	Makati, Metro Manila (until April 2018)	University of Makati Stadium	4,000
Kaya–Iloilo (Kaya–Makati; until April 2018)	Iloilo City (May 2018 onwards)	Iloilo Sports Complex	7,000
Stallion Laguna	Biñan, Laguna	Biñan Football Stadium	2,580

Alternate stadiums

The following are alternate home venues for Davao Aguilas, Global Cebu, and JPV Marikina as approved by Liga Futbol, Inc.

Location	Stadium	Capacity
Manila	Rizal Memorial Stadium	12,873
Biñan, Laguna	Biñan Football Stadium	2,580
Carmona, Cavite	PFF National Training Centre	1,200

Home venues of PFL clubs

- Note: On February 6, 2018, Kaya F.C. transferred from Makati to Iloilo.

=== Personnel and kits ===
Team	Head coach	Captain	Kit manufacturer	Sponsors
Ceres–Negros	(Serbia) Risto Vidaković	(Philippines) Martin Steuble	(Germany) Adidas	Ceres Liner
Davao Aguilas	(Philippines) Melchor Anzures	(Philippines) Phil Younghusband	Made by club	San Miguel Corporation, Tapa King
Global Cebu	(Serbia) Dragutin Stević-Ranković	(Trinidad and Tobago) Darryl Roberts	(Philippines) LGR	TrackMate
JPV Marikina	(Philippines) Dan Padernal	(Japan) Atsushi Shimono	(Philippines) LGR	JK Mart, BranchForth, Santouka Ramen
Kaya FC–Iloilo	(Philippines) Noel Marcaida	(Philippines) Miguel Tanton	(Philippines) LGR	LBC, Fitness First
Stallion Laguna	(Philippines) Ernest Nierras	(Philippines) Ruben Doctora	(Philippines) Nixáre	Giligan's Restaurant

=== Coaching changes ===
Team	Outgoing coach	Manner of departure	Date of vacancy	Position in table	Incoming coach	Date of appointment
Global Cebu	(Singapore) Akbar Nawas	End of Contract	January 11, 2018	Pre-season	(Philippines) Marjo Allado (interim)	January 11, 2018
Davao Aguilas	(Philippines) Marlon Maro	Resigned	May 29, 2018	3rd	(Philippines) Melchor Anzures	May 29, 2018
Global Cebu	(Philippines) Marjo Allado (interim)	Resigned	August 4, 2018	6th	(Serbia) Dragutin Stević-Ranković	August 18, 2018

== Foreign players ==
A maximum of four foreigners are allowed per club which follows the Asian Football Confederation's (AFC) '3+1 rule'; three players of any nationality and a fourth coming from an AFC member nation.

Players name in bold indicates the player was registered during the mid-season transfer window.

Club	Players				Former Players^{1}
Ceres–Negros	(Spain) Toni Doblas	(Spain) Bienvenido Marañón	(Australia) **Blake Powell**	(Spain) Súper	(Japan) Takumi Uesato
Davao Aguilas	(South Korea) Kim Sungmin	(Papua New Guinea) Brad McDonald ^{2} ^{3}	(Australia) **Tahj Minniecon**	(Brazil) **Wesley dos Santos**	(Japan) Takashi Odawara (Australia) Harry Sawyer (Brazil) **Diego Alves**
Global Cebu	(South Korea) Lee Jeong-min	(England) **Adam Mitter**	(Serbia) **Milan Nikolić**	(Trinidad and Tobago) Darryl Roberts	(Spain) Rufo Sánchez (Brazil) Wesley dos Santos
JPV Marikina	(Japan) Keigo Moriyasu	(Japan) Atsushi Shimono	(Japan) Tsubasa Suzuki	(Japan) **Takumi Uesato**	(Japan) Ryuki Kozawa
Kaya–Iloilo	(Cameroon) **Serge Kaole**	(Senegal) Robert Lopez Mendy	(Japan) Masanari Omura	(Ghana) Alfred Osei	(Ghana) Jordan Mintah
Stallion Laguna	(South Korea) Ko Kyung-joon	(Switzerland) Carlo Polli	(Senegal) **Abou Sy**	(South Korea) **Yu Sung-Na**	(Switzerland) Gabriele Mascazzini (Japan) Ken Kensei

- **^1** Former players only include players who left after either the start of the 2018 season or the 2018 Copa Paulino Alcantara.
- **^2** Also a holder of AFC nationality (Australia)

Foreign players by confederation
AFC	Japan (5), South Korea (4), Australia^{3} (2)
CAF	Ghana (1), Senegal (2), Cameroon (1)
CONCACAF	Trinidad and Tobago (1)
CONMEBOL	Brazil (1)
OFC	Papua New Guinea^{3} (1)
UEFA	Spain (3), Switzerland (1), Serbia (1), England (1)

- **^3** Brad McDonald has both Australia and Papua New Guinea FIFA nationality.

== League table ==
Pos	Team	Pld	W	D	L	GF	GA	GD	Pts	Qualification or relegation
1	Ceres–Negros (C)	25	19	3	3	66	25	+41	60	Qualification for the AFC Champions League Preliminary Round 1 or AFC Cup Group Stage
2	Kaya–Iloilo	25	15	4	6	58	32	+26	49	
3	Davao Aguilas	25	11	6	8	52	39	+13	39	
4	Stallion Laguna	25	12	3	10	49	45	+4	36 (Note: Three points were deducted from Stallion Laguna due to the club's failure to comply with Liga Futbol Inc. Disciplinary Committee’s Decision No. 010318DC03.)	
5	JPV Marikina	25	7	2	16	46	63	−17	20 (Note: Three points were deducted from JPV Marikina due to the club's failure to comply with Liga Futbol Inc. Disciplinary Committee’s Decision No. 010318DC02.)	
6	Global Cebu	25	1	2	22	18	85	−67	5	

Source: Philippines Football League
Rules for classification: 1) Points; 2) Goal Difference; 3) Goals Scored
(C) Champions

== Positions by round ==
Team ╲ Round	1	2	3	4	5	6	7	8	9	10	11	12	13	14	15	16	17	18	19	20	21	22	23	24	25
Ceres–Negros	1	1	1	1	1	1	1	1	1	1	1	1	1	1	1	1	1	1	1	1	1	1	1	1	1
Kaya–Iloilo	3	5	4	4	3	3	2	2	2	2	2	2	2	2	2	2	2	2	2	2	2	2	2	2	2
Davao Aguilas	3	3	3	2	2	2	3	3	3	3	4	4	4	3	3	3	3	3	3	3	4	4	3	3	3
Stallion Laguna	5	4	6	5	5	4	4	4	4	4	3	3	3	4	4	4	4	4	4	4	3	3	4	4	4
JPV Marikina	1	2	2	3	4	5	5	5	5	5	5	5	5	5	5	5	5	5	5	5	5	5	5	5	5
Global Cebu	5	6	5	6	6	6	6	6	6	6	6	6	6	6	6	6	6	6	6	6	6	6	6	6	6

AFC Champions League Preliminary Round/AFC Cup Group Stage

Updated to match(es) played on August 30, 2018. Source: Philippines Football League

== Results by round ==
Team ╲ Round	1	2	3	4	5	6	7	8	9	10	11	12	13	14	15	16	17	18	19	20	21	22	23	24	25
Ceres–Negros	W	W	W	W	W	L	W	W	W	D	W	D	W	W	L	W	W	D	W	W	W	W	L	W	W
Davao Aguilas	D	W	D	W	W	L	L	W	L	L	L	L	W	W	W	L	D	L	D	W	D	W	W	W	D
Global Cebu	L	L	D	L	L	L	W	L	L	L	L	D	L	L	L	L	L	L	L	L	L	L	L	L	L
JPV Marikina	W	W	L	L	L	L	L	L	L	W	D	L	L	L	W	L	D	L	L	W	W	L	W	L	L
Kaya–Iloilo	D	L	W	L	W	W	W	W	W	L	W	D	L	W	W	W	D	L	L	W	W	W	D	W	W
Stallion Laguna	L	W	L	W	L	W	W	L	L	W	W	L	W	L	L	L	W	W	D	W	W	W	D	D	L

Updated to match(es) played on August 30, 2018. Source: Philippines Football League
W = Win; D = Draw; L = Loss

== Results ==
The six clubs will play each other in two rounds of home and away matches. The final round hosting will be via drawing of lots. 75 league matches will be played in total.

=== First round ===
Home \ Away	CER	DAV	GLC	JPV	KAY	STA
Ceres–Negros	—	3–0	7–1	4–1	2–1	2–0
Davao Aguilas	0–2	—	1–1	3–2	2–2	5–0
Global Cebu	0–2	2–2	—	1–3	3–1	1–2
JPV Marikina	0–3	0–3	2–1	—	1–4	1–4
Kaya–Iloilo	1–1	4–2	3–0	1–0	—	4–1
Stallion Laguna	2–3	0–1	2–1	1–2	3–1	—

Source: philippinesfootballleague.com
Legend: Blue = home team win; Yellow = draw; Red = away team win.

=== Second round ===
Home \ Away	CER	DAV	GLC	JPV	KAY	STA
Ceres–Negros	—	2–1	6–1	0–2	0–2	2–0
Davao Aguilas	1–3	—	3–0	4–2	3–1	2–2
Global Cebu	3–4	0–3	—	1–5	0–1	1–2
JPV Marikina	1–4	3–3	3–0	—	0–3	1–4
Kaya–Iloilo	1–1	2–1	4–0	4–2	—	4–2
Stallion Laguna	2–6	3–0	4–0	3–2	2–0	—

Source: philippinesfootballleague.com
Legend: Blue = home team win; Yellow = draw; Red = away team win.

=== Final round ===
Home \ Away	CER	DAV	GLC	JPV	KAY	STA
Ceres–Negros	—	0–3	3–0	—	—	4–1
Davao Aguilas	—	—	2–0	—	3–4	—
Global Cebu	—	—	—	1–11	—	0–3
JPV Marikina	1–1	0–3	—	—	1–3	—
Kaya–Iloilo	0–1	—	6–0	—	—	—
Stallion Laguna	—	1–1	—	4–0	1–1	—

Source: philippinesfootballleague.com
Legend: Blue = home team win; Yellow = draw; Red = away team win.

== Season statistics ==
=== Scoring ===
==== Top goalscorers ====
As of August 30, 2018

Rank	Player	Club	Goals
1	(Senegal) Robert Lopez Mendy	Kaya–Iloilo	18
2	(Spain) Bienvenido Marañón	Ceres–Negros	15
3	(Philippines) Phil Younghusband	Davao Aguilas	13
4	(Japan) Keigo Moriyasu	JPV Marikina	11
5	(Philippines) James Younghusband	Davao Aguilas	10
6	(Philippines) Jovin Bedic	Kaya–Iloilo	9
6	(Philippines) Mike Ott	Ceres–Negros	9
6	(Switzerland) Carlo Polli	Stallion Laguna	9
9	(Philippines) J Baguioro	JPV Marikina	8
9	(Philippines) Jesus Melliza	Stallion Laguna	8
9	(South Korea) Kim Sung-Min	Davao Aguilas	8

==== Top assists ====
As of August 30, 2018

Rank	Player	Club	Assists
1	(Philippines) Phil Younghusband	Davao Aguilas	13
2	(Philippines) Mike Ott	Ceres–Negros	11
3	(Philippines) Miguel Tanton	Kaya–Iloilo	10
4	(Philippines) Jovin Bedic	Kaya–Iloilo	9
4	(Philippines) Manny Ott	Ceres–Negros	9
6	(Philippines) Matthew Hartmann	Davao Aguilas	8
6	(Philippines) Jesus Melliza	Stallion Laguna	8
6	(Japan) Keigo Moriyasu	JPV Marikina	8
9	(Senegal) Robert Lopez Mendy	Kaya–Iloilo	6
10	(Philippines) Fitch Arboleda	Stallion Laguna	5
10	(Philippines) Tyler Matas	Davao Aguilas	5
10	(Philippines) OJ Porteria	Ceres–Negros	5
10	(Philippines) Patrick Reichelt	Ceres–Negros	5
10	(Philippines) Stephan Schröck	Ceres–Negros	5
10	(Philippines) James Younghusband	Davao Aguilas	5

==== Own goals ====
As of August 22, 2018

Rank	Player	Club	Own goals
1	(Philippines) Terence Linatoc	Stallion Laguna	1
1	(Japan) Tsubasa Suzuki	JPV Marikina	1
1	(Philippines) Reynald Villareal	Stallion Laguna	1
1	(South Korea) Ko Kyung-joon	Stallion Laguna	1

=== Hat-tricks ===
As of August 22, 2018

Player	Club	Result	Against	Date	Ref
(Ghana) Jordan Mintah	Kaya–Iloilo	4–1 (A)	JPV Marikina	May 5, 2018	
(Senegal) Robert Lopez Mendy	Kaya–Iloilo	4–2 (H)	Davao Aguilas	May 20, 2018	
(Senegal) Robert Lopez Mendy	Kaya–Iloilo	4–2 (H)	JPV Marikina	June 27, 2018	
(Philippines) Jovin Bedic	Kaya–Iloilo	4–2 (H)	Stallion Laguna	July 4, 2018	
(Spain) Bienvenido Marañón	Ceres–Negros	6–1 (H)	Global Cebu	July 25, 2018	
(Japan) Keigo Moriyasu	JPV Marikina	11–1 (A)	Global Cebu	August 1, 2018	
(Philippines) Jay Baguioro	JPV Marikina	11–1 (A)	Global Cebu	August 1, 2018	

Note

(H) – Home; (A) – Away

=== Clean sheets ===
As of August 29, 2018

Rank	Player	Club	Clean sheets
1	(Spain) Toni Doblas	Ceres–Negros	7
2	(Philippines) Nathanael Villanueva	Kaya–Iloilo	4
3	(Philippines) Patrick Deyto	Davao Aguilas	3
4	(Philippines) Ronilo Bayan Jr.	Davao Aguilas	2
4	(Philippines) Nick O'Donnell	Davao Aguilas	2
4	(Philippines) Felipe Tripulca	Stallion Laguna	2
7	(Philippines) Zach Banzon	Kaya–Iloilo	1
7	(Philippines) Ref Cuaresma	Kaya–Iloilo	1
7	(Philippines) Nelson Gasic	JPV Marikina	1
7	(Philippines) Hayeson Pepito	Stallion Laguna	1
7	(Philippines) Benito Rosalia	Stallion Laguna	1

=== Discipline ===
==== Red cards ====
As of August 23, 2018

Rank	Player	Club	Red Cards
1	(Ghana) Alfred Osei	Kaya–Iloilo	2
1	(Philippines) Omid Nazari	Ceres–Negros	2
1	(Senegal) Robert Lopez Mendy	Kaya–Iloilo	2
4	(Spain) Rufo Sanchez	Global Cebu	1
4	(Philippines) Dennis Villanueva	Davao Aguilas	1
4	(Philippines) Adam Reed	Davao Aguilas	1
4	(Philippines) Jason Cordova	Stallion Laguna	1
4	(Philippines) Camelo Tacusalme	Kaya–Iloilo	1
4	(Philippines) Robert Cañedo	JPV Marikina	1
4	(Philippines) Shirmar Felongco	Kaya–Iloilo	1
4	(Philippines) Angelo Marasigan	Global Cebu	1
4	(Philippines) OJ Porteria	Ceres–Negros	1
4	(Philippines) Louie Casas	Ceres–Negros	1
4	(Philippines) Mike Ott	Ceres–Negros	1
4	(Serbia) Milan Nikolić	Global Cebu	1
