= Dylan De Bruycker =

Filipino footballer (born 1997)

Personal information
- Full name: Dylan Alain Lucienne Escalana De Bruycker
- Date of birth: 5 December 1997 (age 28)
- Place of birth: Ghent, Belgium
- Height: 1.80 m (5 ft 11 in)
- Position: Defensive midfielder

Team information
- Current team: Sisaket United (on loan from Ayutthaya United)
- Number: 34

Youth career
- 2005–2009: Gent
- 2010–2016: Club Brugge
- 2016: Zulte Waregem

Senior career*
Years	Team	Apps	(Gls)
2017–2018	Davao Aguilas	23	(5)
2019–2020	Ceres–Negros	12	(1)
2020–2021	Kaya–Iloilo	5	(0)
2021–2023	Nakhon Ratchasima	32	(0)
2023	Bhayangkara	7	(0)
2025	Manila Digger	7	(2)
2025–	Ayutthaya United	6	(0)
2026–	→ Sisaket United (loan)	0	(0)

International career^{‡}
2013–2014	Belgium U15	4	(0)
2014	Belgium U16	4	(1)
2014–2015	Belgium U17	3	(0)
2017–2019	Philippines U22	11	(1)
2017–2019	Philippines U23	6	(0)
2017–	Philippines	7	(0)
- * Club domestic league appearances and goals as of 18 October 2025 ‡ National team caps and goals as of 19 June 2023

Dylan Alain Lucienne Escalana De Bruycker (born 5 December 1997) is a professional footballer who plays as a defensive midfielder for Thai League 2 club Sisaket United, on loan from Thai League 1 club Ayutthaya United and the Philippines national team.

Born in Belgium to a Belgian father and a Filipino mother, De Bruycker began his career with the youth teams of Belgian First Division A clubs and has represented Belgium at the youth levels. In 2017, he moved to the Philippines to play for the national team and has represented clubs Davao Aguilas, Ceres–Negros, and Kaya–Iloilo.

== Club career ==
=== Youth ===
Born in Ghent, Belgium, De Bruycker began his career with the youth team of local club Gent. He later joined Club Brugge at age 13. In 2016, he played for Zulte Waregem.

=== Davao Aguilas ===
In April 2017, it was announced that the 19-year-old De Bruycker joined Davao Aguilas of the Philippines Football League (PFL). He made his PFL debut for Davao on 7 May, when he scored the club's first ever league goal in a 1–1 away draw against Ilocos United. He then scored a brace in Davao's second match of the season on 14 May, a 3–2 home loss against JPV Marikina. On 21 June, De Bruycker scored the equaliser in a 2–2 draw against Meralco Manila, ending Meralco's five–match winning run. Davao Aguilas ended the first PFL season in 7th place out of 8 teams.

In the 2018 season, De Bruycker scored the fourth goal in the 5–0 thrashing of Stallion Laguna on 16 June. Davao finished third in the league and were runners-up in the Copa Paulino Alcantara. After their 2018 season, Davao Aguilas folded and released all its players.

=== Ceres–Negros ===
De Bruycker was signed by Ceres–Negros in January 2019. He scored the team's second goal in a 3–0 league win over Philippine Air Force on 17 August. In the Copa Paulino Alcantara, he scored the equalising goal against Philippines U22 as Ceres eventually won 2–1 on 30 October. De Bruycker was part of the Ceres–Negros squad that won the domestic league and cup double in their unbeaten 2019 season.

On 28 January 2020, he started against FC Tokyo in the AFC Champions League qualifying play-offs, where they were knocked out after a 2–0 loss. In March, due to the COVID-19 pandemic, domestic and Asian competitions were either cancelled or postponed. The resulting financial losses forced club chairman Leo Rey Yanson to sell Ceres–Negros in July. De Bruycker was not among the players retained by the new owners.

=== Kaya–Iloilo ===
In October 2020, Kaya–Iloilo announced the signing of De Bruycker. With Kaya, he played in the 2021 AFC Champions League and won the 2021 Copa Paulino Alcantara.

=== Nakhon Ratchasima ===
In December 2021, De Bruycker signed for Thai League 1 club Nakhon Ratchasima for the second half of the 2021–22 season as one of the three available spots for ASEAN players.

== International career ==
De Bruycker was born in Belgium to a Belgian father and a Filipino mother, making him eligible to play for Belgium or the Philippines. He initially chose Belgium as a U-15, U-16 and U-17 national team member, playing a total of 11 games.

=== Philippines U-22 and U-23 ===
In July 2017, De Bruycker received a call-up for the Philippines U-23 football team to compete at the 2018 AFC U-23 Championship qualification that was held in Cambodia. On 19 July 2017, he earned his first cap for the Philippines U-23 team in an 8–0 defeat against Japan U-23.

De Bruycker was part of the Philippines U-22 squad that competed in the 2017 Southeast Asian Games held in Malaysia. Philippines finished fourth out of six in the group stage and failed to advance to the knockout rounds.

In February 2019, he was part of the Philippines' squad for the AFF U-22 Youth Championship held in Phnom Penh, Cambodia. Philippines lost all of their three group matches in the tournament. In March, he participated in the qualifications for the 2020 AFC U-23 Championship. Philippines failed to win a single match in the qualifiers.

De Bruycker was named in the squad for the 2019 Southeast Asian Games, which the Philippines hosted. He scored in their last group stage match, a 6–1 thrashing of Timor-Leste. However, the team failed to advance to the semi-finals.

=== Philippines ===
De Bruycker was called up to the Philippines senior team in August 2017, ahead of the 2019 AFC Asian Cup Qualifiers against Yemen. In October 2017, he was again called up for the Philippines senior team for their away game against Yemen in Doha, Qatar.

In December 2017, he took part at the 2017 CTFA International Tournament though the squad that played in the friendly tournament in Taiwan was mentored by Marlon Maro in lieu of regular head coach Thomas Dooley. He later featured in a friendly against Fiji with a Dooley-mentored squad after he was substituted in at the start of the second half of the match, which ended in a 3–2 win.

== Honours ==
Davao Aguilas

- Copa Paulino Alcantara runner-up: 2018

Ceres–Negros

- Philippines Football League: 2019
- Copa Paulino Alcantara: 2019

Kaya–Iloilo

- Copa Paulino Alcantara: 2021
