= 2019 Copa Paulino Alcantara =

2nd season of the Copa Paulino Alcantara

Tournament details
- Country: Philippines
- Dates: October 26 – November 16
- Teams: 7

Final positions
- Champions: Ceres-Negros (1st title)

Tournament statistics
- Matches played: 12
- Goals scored: 40 (3.33 per match)
- Top goal scorer(s): Robert Lopez Mendy (5 goals)

The 2019 Copa Paulino Alcantara was the second edition of the Copa Paulino Alcantara, the domestic football cup competition of the Philippines. It included 6 out of 7 Philippines Football League teams as well as a guest team, the Philippines U22. It started on October 26, 2019, and concluded on November 16, 2019, with Ceres-Negros beating Kaya-Iloilo in the final, 2–1.

== Participating clubs ==
All seven clubs of the 2019 Philippines Football League are eligible to participate in the tournament. However, Global Makati which was undergoing a reorganization, pulled out of the tournament. A guest team, the Philippines U-22, competed in the tournament as preparation for the upcoming 2019 Southeast Asian Games

Philippines Football League; The 6 teams of the 2019 season, barring Global Makati.	Guest Team; Other teams invited to the tournament
Ceres–Negros; Green Archers United; Kaya FC–Iloilo; Philippine Air Force; Mendiola; Stallion Laguna	Philippines U22

== Format ==
=== Competition ===
The Copa Paulino Alcantara commenced on October 26, 2019 with a group phase of two groups with four teams each. A round robin format was used for this phase. The top two teams advanced to the semifinals with the group winners facing the runner-up team from the other group. The higher seeded teams hosted the one-off semifinals. The final consist of a single match as well.

=== Draw ===
The draw for the 2019 Copa Paulino Alcantara was held on October 20, 2019. Due to Global's sudden backing out, one group will have 3 teams while the other will have 4. The top 2 teams of the 2019 Philippines Football League season, namely Ceres-Negros and Kaya-Iloilo are the two seeded teams. The other five will be in pot 2.

Pot 1 (Seeded Teams)	Pot 2 (Non-seeded Teams)	
Ceres–Negros (PFL Champion); Kaya–Iloilo (PFL Runner-up)	Stallion Laguna; Green Archers United; Mendiola	Philippine Air Force; Philippines U22

== Group stage ==
Key to colours in group tables
Group winners and runners-up advance to the semifinals

=== Group A ===
Pos	Team	Pld	W	D	L	GF	GA	GD	Pts	Qualification	CER	MEN	U22	GAU
1	Ceres–Negros	3	2	1	0	8	3	+5	7	Semi-finals	—	2–2	—	4–0
2	Mendiola	3	1	2	0	5	4	+1	5	Semi-finals	—	—	2–2	1–0
3	Philippines U22	3	1	1	1	4	4	0	4		1–2	—	—	—
4	Green Archers United	3	0	0	3	0	6	−6	0		—	—	0–1	—

Source: PFL

October 26, 2019 1	Ceres–Negros	2–2	Mendiola	Lipa
19:00 UTC+8	Lopez Mendy 4', 31'		Hajimehdi 45+1'; Corsame 64'	Stadium: Aboitiz Pitch

October 27, 2019 2	Green Archers United	0–1	Philippines U22	Lipa
16:00 UTC+8			Uzoka 50'	Stadium: Aboitiz Pitch

October 30, 2019 3	Philippines U22	1–2	Ceres–Negros	Biñan
16:00 UTC+8	Galantes 30'		De Bruycker 61'; Lopez Mendy 86'	Stadium: Biñan Football Stadium

October 30, 2019 4	Mendiola	1–0	Green Archers United	Lipa
16:00 UTC+8	Flores 19'			Stadium: Aboitiz Pitch

November 6, 2019 5	Ceres–Negros	4–0	Green Archers United	Lipa
19:00 UTC+8	J. Younghusband 16'; Mi. Ott 68'; Barberan 80'; Lopez Mendy 82'			Stadium: Aboitiz Pitch

November 6, 2019 6	Mendiola	2–2	Philippines U22	Biñan
19:00 UTC+8	Hajimehdi 44'; Flores 68'		Uzoka 8', 16'	Stadium: Biñan Football Stadium

=== Group B ===
Pos	Team	Pld	W	D	L	GF	GA	GD	Pts	Qualification	KAY	STA	PAF
1	Kaya–Iloilo	2	1	1	0	6	1	+5	4	Semi-finals	—	—	5–0
2	Stallion Laguna	2	1	1	0	3	2	+1	4	Semi-finals	1–1	—	—
3	Philippine Air Force	2	0	0	2	1	7	−6	0		—	1–2	—

Source: PFL

October 26, 2019 1	Kaya–Iloilo	5–0	Philippine Air Force	Lipa
16:00 UTC+8	Panhay 29'; Daniels 33', 63'; Tacagni 36'; Mw. Angeles 69'			Stadium: Aboitiz Pitch

October 30, 2019 2	Philippine Air Force	1–2	Stallion Laguna	Lipa
19:00 UTC+8	Elnar 35'		Arboleda 38' (pen.); Alquiros 85' (pen.)	Stadium: Aboitiz Pitch

November 6, 2019 3	Stallion Laguna	1–1	Kaya–Iloilo	Biñan
16:00 UTC+8	Belgira 72'		Panhay 57'	Stadium: Biñan Football Stadium

== Knock-out stage ==
=== Bracket ===
Semifinals; November 10
A1	Ceres–Negros	4
B2	Stallion Laguna	3
B1	Kaya–Iloilo	3
A2	Mendiola	0

Final; November 16
W1	Ceres–Negros	2
W2	Kaya–Iloilo	1

=== Semi-finals ===
November 10, 2019 Semi-final	Kaya–Iloilo	3–0	Mendiola	Lipa
16:00 UTC+8	Daniels 50'; Omura 72'; Roberts 80'	Report		Stadium: Aboitiz Pitch

November 10, 2019 Semi-final	Ceres–Negros	4–3	Stallion Laguna	Biñan
16:00 UTC+8	Schrock 18', 69'; Mi. Ott 29', 77'		Najm 9'; Sy 15'; Melliza 85'	Stadium: Biñan Football Stadium

=== Final ===
November 16, 2019 Championship	Ceres–Negros	2–1	Kaya–Iloilo	Biñan
17:00 UTC+8	Lopez Mendy 30'; Robles 68'		Daniels 85'	Stadium: Biñan Football Stadium; Referee: Clifford Daypuyat

== Top scorers ==
Team eliminated / inactive for this round.

Rank	Player	Team	MD1	MD2	MD3	SF	F	Total
1	(Senegal) Robert Lopez Mendy	Ceres–Negros	2	1	1		1	5
2	(Philippines) Kenshiro Daniels	Kaya-Iloilo	2			1	1	4
3	(Philippines) Mike Ott	Ceres–Negros			1	2		3
3	(Philippines) Chima Uzoka	Philippines U22	1		2			3
5	(Philippines) Jim Ashley Flores	Mendiola		1	1			2
5	(Iran) Hamed Hajimehdi	Mendiola	1		1			2
5	(Philippines) Jason Panhay	Kaya-Iloilo	1	1				2
5	(Philippines) Stephan Schrock	Ceres–Negros				2		2

== Awards ==
Award	Winner	Club
Golden Ball	(Japan) Takashi Odawara	Ceres–Negros
Golden Boot	(Senegal) Robert Lopez Mendy	Ceres–Negros
Golden Glove	(Philippines) Roland Müller	Ceres–Negros
