= Aboitiz Football Cup =

- Organiser(s): Aboitiz Group
- Region: Batangas, Davao, Cebu, and Tarlac
- 25th Aboitiz Football Cup (2025)

The Aboitiz Football Cup is an annual football tournament held in the Philippines. The tournament consists of 10 categories, from players eight up to the men's open.

It was originally established in Cebu and it served as the province's most prestigious football tournament until its move to Lipa, Batangas in 2019.

== History ==
The Aboitiz Football Cup was established in Cebu. The second edition of the competition in 1997 only featured a men's division which saw the participation of alumni and club teams such as M. Lhuillier. The women's open and youth divisions were later added to the competition. Later, additional youth divisions for both boys and girls were added to the Aboitiz Football Cup program.

The competition underwent a rebrand for the 19th edition in 2017. Plans to make the scope of the tournament nationwide in the 20th edition in 2018 has been announced.

In the 2018 edition, the first tournament was held in Luzon at the Aboitiz Pitch in Lipa, Batangas. The Luzon tournament was simultaneously held with the Visayas tournament in Cebu. By 2019, the tournament has moved to Lipa.

The 21st edition which started in August 2019, was disrupted and postponed indefinitely due to the onset of the COVID-19 pandemic. In July 2022, it was decided that the leading teams in their respective age-group division tournaments to be awarded as champions.

The Aboitiz Cup returns with the conduct of its 22nd edition at the Aboitiz Pitch in Lipa, Batangas which commenced in November 2022.

In 2025, the Aboitiz Cup returned to Cebu for its 25th edition.

== Venues ==
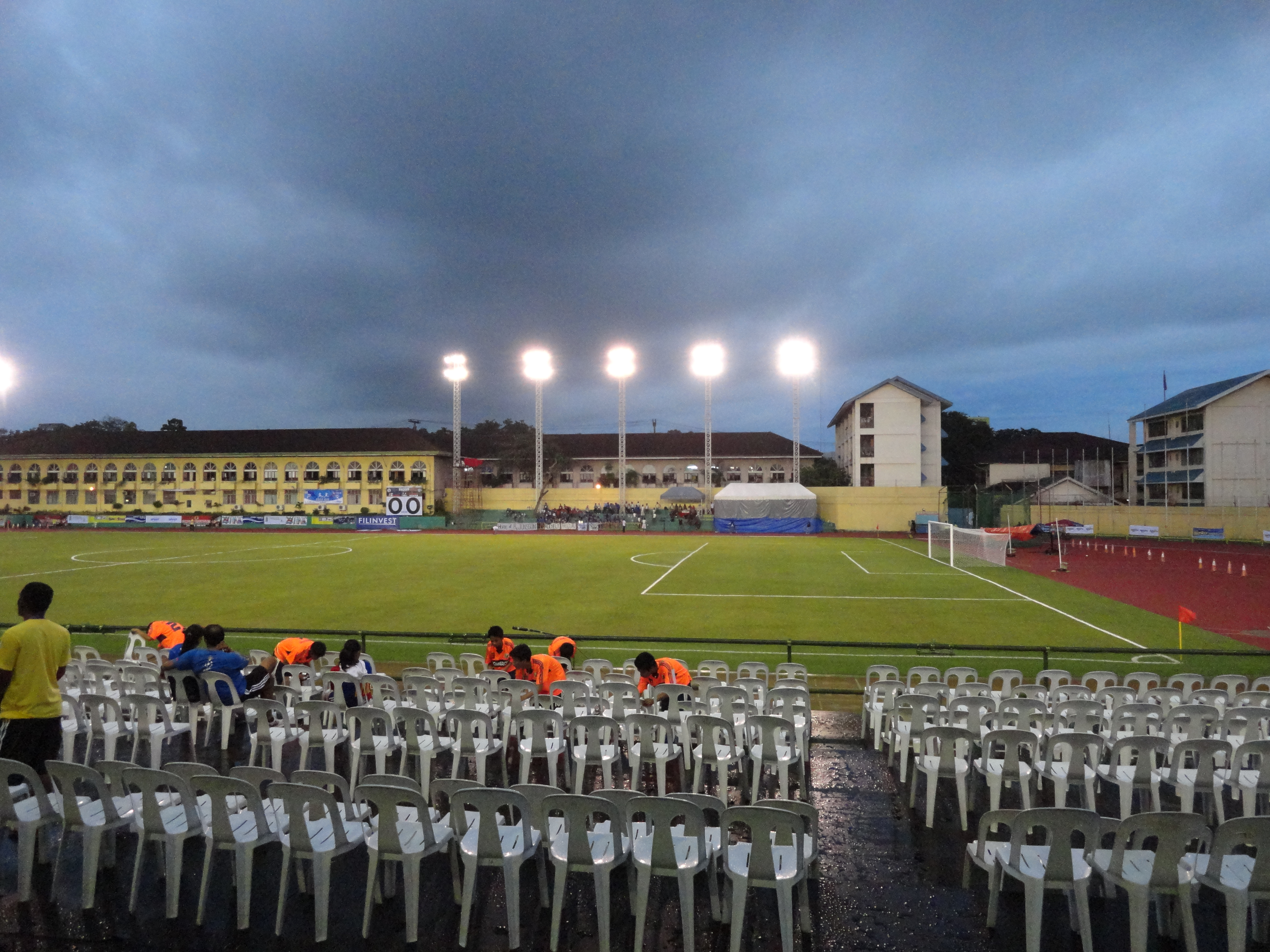
The Cebu City Sports Complex.

Four venues are used for football matches of the Aboitiz Football Cup as of the 19th edition (2017).

- Cebu City Sports Center
- Sacred Heart School-Ateneo de Cebu
- Don Bosco Technical College
- PAREF Springdale

Since 2018, the tournament has used the Aboitiz Pitch in Lipa, Batangas.
