= Tyler Matas =

American soccer player (born 1984)

Personal information
- Full name: Tyler Joseph Cunningham Matas
- Date of birth: August 3, 1994 (age 32)
- Place of birth: Honolulu, Hawaii, United States
- Height: 5 ft 9 in (1.75 m)
- Positions: Defender; midfielder

College career
Years	Team	Apps	(Gls)
2012–2016	Notre Dame de Namur University		

Senior career*
Years	Team	Apps	(Gls)
2016–2017	Burlingame Dragons	0	(0)
2017–2018	Meralco Manila	29	(2)
2018–2019	Davao Aguilas	22	(1)
2019–2020	Kaya F.C.-Iloilo	3	(0)
- * Club domestic league appearances and goals as of September 9, 2019 ‡ National team caps and goals as of September 9, 2019

Tyler Joseph Cunningham Matas (born August 3, 1994) is a footballer who plays as a defender. He last played for Philippines Football League club Kaya F.C.-Iloilo.

== Education ==
Matas attended Notre Dame de Namur University for his collegiate studies.

== Collegiate career ==
Matas played for the football team of his college, Notre Dame de Namur University in the NCAA Division II. In his freshman year, he was named as NDNU's Male Freshman Athlete of the year. In his sophomore and junior years, he was named as NDNU's Male Athlete of the year award.

== Club career ==
=== Burlingame Dragons ===
In 2016, after training with LA Galaxy during the off-season, Matas joined Premier Development League club Burlingame Dragons.

=== Meralco Manila ===
In 2017, Matas joined Philippines Football League club Meralco Manila.

In January 2018, it was announced that Meralco Manila have ceased operations. The management stated that they attempted to find investors to keep the club running but were unable to do so.

=== Davao Aguilas ===
In February 2018, Matas joined Mindanao-based Philippines Football League club Davao Aguilas.

After the 2018 season, it was reported on December 14, 2018, that Davao Aguilas has withdrawn from the PFL. Reasons for the withdrawal is yet to be officially disclosed by club owner Jefferson Cheng who iterated continued support for infrastructure and grassroots development in Davao. He is set to discuss with the club's stakeholders over the fate of the club itself. Cheng has also cited the decision to hire Bernie Sumayao to manage the PFL despite his volunteering to take over the management of the league.

=== Kaya ===
In February 2019, Matas joined Kaya F.C.-Iloilo after the folding of Davao Aguilas.

== International career ==
Born in Honolulu, Hawaii to Filipino parents, Matas is eligible to represent United States and Philippines at international level.

=== Philippines ===
In August 2017, Matas was named in the Philippines' 23-man squad for their 2019 AFC Asian Cup qualifiers against Yemen on 5 September 2017.
