= Junior Muñoz =

Filipino footballer

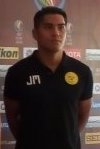

Personal information
- Full name: Jim Junior Abgelina Muñoz
- Date of birth: May 18, 1987 (age 39)
- Place of birth: Haarlem, Netherlands
- Height: 1.67 m (5 ft 6 in)
- Position: Defender

Youth career
- SV Hoofddorp
- HFC Haarlem

Senior career*
Years	Team	Apps	(Gls)
2014–2015	Stallion		
2015–2016	Kaya		
2017–2020	Ceres–Negros		
2022–2023	Stallion Laguna		

International career^{‡}
2016–	Philippines	12	(0)
- * Club domestic league appearances and goals as of 1 June 2020 ‡ National team caps and goals as of 7 September 2018

Jim Junior Abgelina Muñoz (born 18 May 1987) is a professional footballer who last played as a defender for Philippines Football League club Stallion Laguna. Born in the Netherlands, he plays for the Philippines national team.

== Early life ==
Junior was born and raised in Haarlem, Netherlands, where he started to play football at the age of six for local club SV Hoofddorp. In 2001, he was scouted to play for the youth academy of HFC Haarlem, a first-division Dutch football club.

== Club career ==
In 2012, Muñoz signed for Kaya F.C., a Filipino club that played in the United Football League. After a couple successful seasons Muñoz received multiple offers and eventually transferred to Stallion Laguna F.C. Muñoz returned to former club Kaya F.C. at the start of the season in 2015, the same year the club bagged the United Football League title. Muñoz signed with Ceres–Negros F.C. in January 2017 & became Asean Zonal AFC Cup champion, where he was included in the Asean AFC selection team and chosen as the best right-back defender/attacker in the Asean AFC Cup. Muñoz was also instrumental in helping Ceres–Negros bag the Philippine Football League title in 2017. In 2018, Muñoz competed with Ceres–Negros in the 2018 AFC Champions League qualifying play-offs, defeating Myanmar side Shan United F.C. and Australian club Brisbane Roar FC, but failing to qualify after a 2–0 loss to Tianjin Quanjian.

== International career ==
Muñoz played in the AFC Cup for Kaya F.C. back in 2016 and was instrumental with effective numbers of assist on goals & defense during the AFC tournament in May 2016 held in Singapore, Maldives & Hong Kong. In one of the highlights, Muñoz effectively executed a very fine cross pass to OJ Porteria in scoring a goal on stoppage-time to force a 1–0 win against New Radiant F.C. from Maldives. In this tournament KAYA F.C. propelled one of the first two premier football clubs from the Philippines able to reach the AFC Cup 16-team level in Asia, so far in the history. Philippine AZKALS – Muñoz received his first call up for the Philippine national football team in August 2016 for a friendly against Turkmenistan. The friendly was later cancelled. Muñoz made his debut on September 6, 2016, in a friendly against Kyrgyzstan coming in as a substitute for Kevin Ingreso in the second half. Muñoz executed a very fine headball assist, helping Misagh Bahadoran score a goal and thus helped Azkals win the match. Muñoz made his second appearance for Azkals on October 10, 2016, by substituting James Joseph Younghusband as right-wing attacker in the second half during the friendly match against North Korea. Muñoz has been part of the Philippines national football team ever since and partly competed in the 2019 AFC Asian Cup.
