= Nathanael Villanueva =

Filipino footballer (born 1995)

Personal information
- Full name: Nathanael Ace Pineda Villanueva
- Date of birth: October 25, 1995 (age 31)
- Place of birth: Philippines
- Height: 1.83 m (6 ft 0 in)
- Position: Goalkeeper

Team information
- Current team: Cebu
- Number: 25

College career
Years	Team	Apps	(Gls)
–2017	UP Fighting Maroons		

Senior career*
Years	Team	Apps	(Gls)
–2015	Pachanga Diliman		
2016–2018	Meralco Manila	14	(0)
2018–2020	Kaya F.C.–Iloilo	26	(0)
2021–	Cebu	9	(0)

International career^{‡}
2015–2017	Philippines U23	2	(0)
- * Club domestic league appearances and goals as of 19:23, December 28, 2018 (UTC) ‡ National team caps and goals as of 19:23, December 28, 2018 (UTC)

Nathanael Ace Pineda Villanueva (born October 25, 1995) is a Filipino footballer who plays as a goalkeeper, most recently for Philippines Football League club Cebu.

== Career ==
Villanueva played for the college team UP Fighting Maroons. He appeared for Meralco Manila and Kaya F.C.–Iloilo in the professional Philippines Football League.

On May 12, 2018, Villanueva was named man of the match for his performance in Kaya's 2–0 win over Ceres–Negros. He saved Bienvenido Marañón's penalty kick in the 20th minute, and was instrumental in ending Ceres' five-match winning streak. He joined Cebu F.C. in 2021.

Villanueva was named in the Philippines' squad for the 2018 Bangabandhu Cup and 2019 AFC Asian Cup, but is yet to earn a senior international cap.
