= Angelo Marasigan =

Filipino footballer and tiktoker

Angélo Marasigan
Personal information
- Full name: Angélo Verheye Marasigan
- Date of birth: May 14, 1992 (age 34)
- Place of birth: Cebu City, Philippines
- Height: 1.70 m (5 ft 7 in)
- Positions: Midfielder; defender

Team information
- Current team: Stallion Laguna

Youth career
- Gent
- Zulte Waregem

Senior career*
Years	Team	Apps	(Gls)
2012–2013	Zulte Waregem II		
2013	Pasargad	0	(0)
2013	Loyola Meralco Sparks	0	(0)
2013–2015	Ceres	3	(1)
2015–2016	Olsa Brakel	3	(0)
2016–2017	Temse		
2017–2018	Ilocos United		
2018–2019	Global Cebu		
2019–2021	United City	0	(0)
2024	Stallion Laguna	2	(2)
2024	→Loyola (loan)	1	(0)
2024–	Stallion Laguna	0	(0)

International career^{‡}
2013	Philippines U20	0	(0)
2018	Philippines	2	(0)
- * Club domestic league appearances and goals as of 01:12, 03 August 2024 (UTC) ‡ National team caps and goals as of 03:21, 21 February 2019 (UTC)

Angélo Verheye Marasigan (born 14 May 1992) is a Filipino footballer who plays as a midfielder for Philippines Football League club Stallion Laguna.

== Career ==
=== Youth ===
Born in Cebu City, Marasigan moved to Belgium at an early age and had his youth career at K.A.A. Gent and Zulte Waregem

=== Zulte Waregem II ===
In 2012, he joined the B-team of S.V. Zulte Waregem.

=== Pasargad ===
In January 2013, Marasigan joined United Football League club Pasargad.

=== Loyola ===
Months after his stint with Pasargad, Marasigan joined fellow UFL club Loyola.

=== Ceres ===
In September 2013, he joined United Football League Division 2 club Ceres F.C.

=== Ilocos United ===
In 2017, after his stint with Belgian lower league teams Olsa Brakel and Temse, Marasigan joined Philippines Football League club Ilocos United

=== Global Cebu ===
In January 2018, Marasigan joined fellow Philippines Football League club Global Cebu, Ilocos United announced its withdrawal from the league after failing to secure a new naming sponsor.

=== Return to Ceres ===
In February 2019, Marasigan returned to 2017 and 2018 PFL champions Ceres–Negros ahead of their 2019 AFC Champions League qualifiers against Yangon United.

== International career ==
=== Youth ===
In 2013, Marasigan was called up for the Philippines U-20.

=== Philippines ===
Marasigan was called up for the Philippines in November 2017, he was included in the 23-man squad that will participate in the CTFA International Tournament.

Marasigan was once again called up for the Philippines in October 2018, he was included in the final 21-man squad that will participate in the 2018 Bangabandhu Cup.
