= Biñan Football Stadium =

Athletics and football stadium in Biñan, Philippines

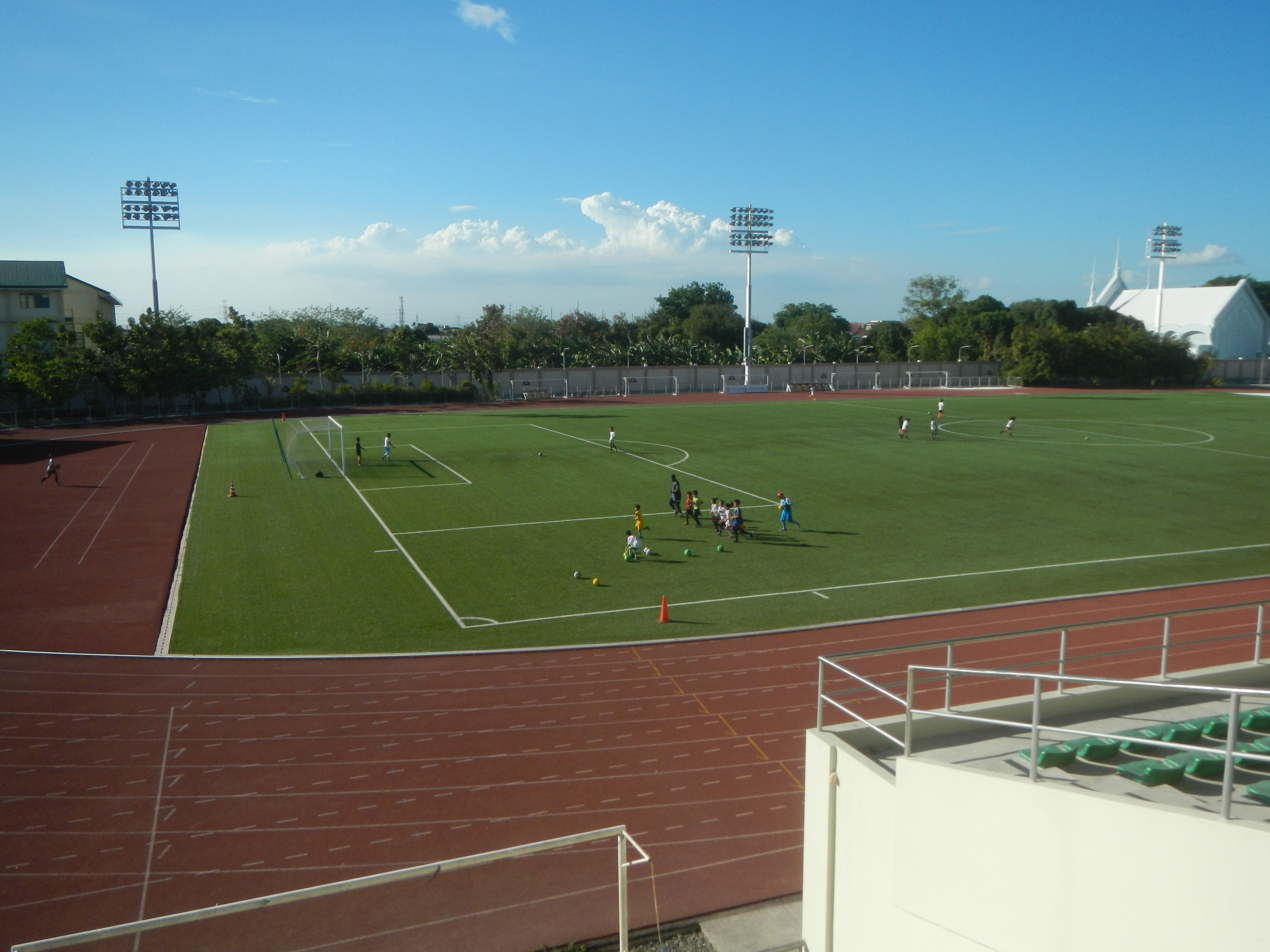
- The football field in 2018
- Interactive map of Biñan Football Stadium
- Location: Zapote, Biñan, Laguna, Philippines
- Coordinates: 14°18′53″N 121°04′40″E
- Owner: Biñan City Government
- Capacity: 2,580
- Surface: Artificial grass
- Field size: 66 x 102 m

Construction
- Built: 2015
- Cost: ₱320 million

Tenants
- Philippines women's national football team Stallion Laguna; Stallion Laguna Women; Quickstrike FA

The Biñan Football Stadium is a track and field and football venue in Biñan, Laguna, Philippines.

On October 28, 2015, the Biñan city government and the Philippine Football Federation signed a memorandum of understanding agreeing that the stadium shall be the home stadium of the Philippines women's national football team as well as the national youth teams at least until 2019. The stadium was upgraded in anticipation of its hosting of football matches at the 2019 Southeast Asian Games.

== Specifications ==
The Biñan Football Stadium has a seating capacity of 3,000. The football field is 66 meters wide and 102 meters long. E-Sports installed an artificial grass field named Diamond 50 from an Italian company. The sporting field was also rated FIFA 2 star by Kiwa ISA Sport B.V., a FIFA-accredited testing institute based in the Netherlands.

Five lighting towers were provided by American company Musco which is based in Iowa. The towers can provide 1400 lx of light. The grandstand is around four and a half meters away from the track and will have no vertical pillars. Four dressing rooms are also hosted. A boxing ring is planned to be put inside the grandstand. It hosts an air-conditioned media center, ticketing booths, portalets, baggage areas, and a VIP lounge. A 12 by 9 metres (39 ft × 30 ft) scoreboard is installed behind one of the two goals.

== Sports events ==
- 2017 Philippines Football League
- 2018 Philippines Football League
- 2018 Copa Paulino Alcantara
- 2019 Philippines Football League
- 2019 Copa Paulino Alcantara
- 2019 Southeast Asian Games (Football only)
- 2022 AFF Women's Championship
- 2022–23 Philippines Football League
- 2023–24 AFC Cup
- 2024–25 Philippines Football League
- 2024–25 ASEAN Club Championship

== See also ==
- List of football stadiums in the Philippines
- Rizal Memorial Stadium
- New Clark City Athletics Stadium
- Philippine Sports Stadium
- Panaad Stadium
- PFF National Training Center
