= Connor Tacagni =

Footballer (born 1993)

Personal information
- Full name: Connor Reece Escoto Tacagni
- Date of birth: September 27, 1993 (age 33)
- Place of birth: Shrewsbury, United Kingdom
- Positions: Striker; winger

Team information
- Current team: Kaya F.C.-Iloilo
- Number: 29

Youth career
- Congleton High School
- 2014-2017: San Beda University
- 2014–2017: San Beda Red Booters

Senior career*
Years	Team	Apps	(Gls)
2017-2018	FC Meralco Manila	17	(2)
2018–2019	Kaya F.C.-Iloilo	41	(7)

International career
2015	Philippines U23	1	(0)
- * Club domestic league appearances and goals

Connor Reece Escoto Tacagni (born September 27, 1993) is a professional footballer who plays as a striker or winger for Philippines Football League club Kaya F.C.-Iloilo. Born in England, he has represented the Philippines U23 national team.

== Club career ==
=== San Beda College ===
Tacagni began his Filipino amateur football career from 2015 to 2017 at San Beda University on a sports scholarship, joining the football team as a striker. He played under coach Aris Caslib, who was also the U23 Philippines national team coach at the time.

=== FC Meralco Manila ===
Tacagni began his professional career in the Philippines Football League following a transfer to FC Meralco Manila in 2017, until the team was disestablished in 2018.

=== Kaya F.C. - Iloilo ===
Since 2018, Tacagni has played for Kaya F.C.–Iloilo as a member of the squad that won the Copa Paulino Alcantara in 2018. Qualifying for the AFC Cup, Tacagni played in the group stages.

== International career ==
Tacagni was born in Shrewsbury, England to an English father and a Filipino mother, which made him eligible to play for England and the Philippines.

Tacagni made his international debut for the Philippines national under-23 football team at the Southeast Asian Games 2015 hosted in Singapore.
