= Takashi Odawara =

Japanese footballer (born 1992)

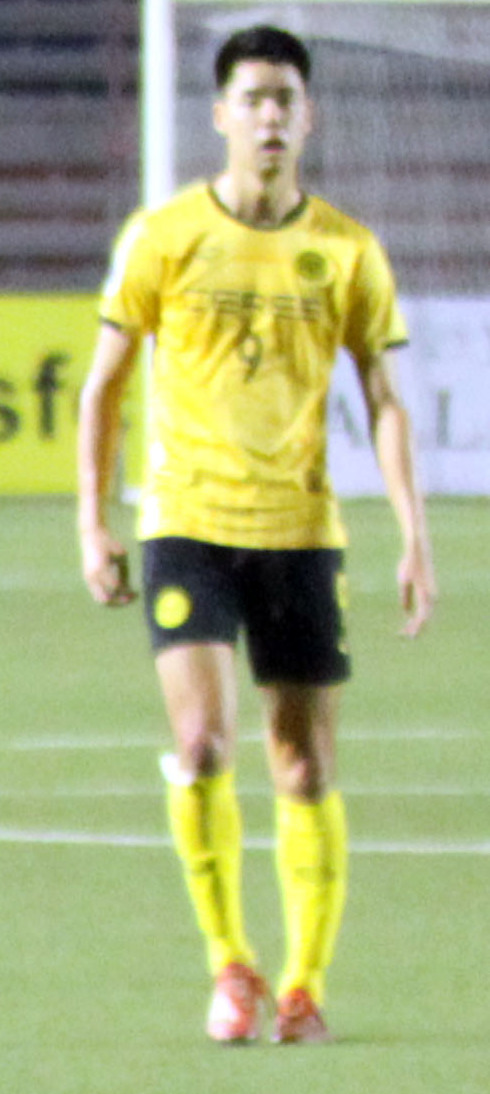
- Odawara in 2020

Personal information
- Full name: Takashi Odawara
- Date of birth: 3 December 1992 (age 33)
- Place of birth: Tokyo, Japan
- Height: 1.84 m (6 ft 1/2 in)
- Position: Defender

Team information
- Current team: Preah Khan Reach Svay Rieng
- Number: 61

Youth career
- 2005–2007: Furoku SC
- 2008–2010: FC Toripletta

College career
| Years | Team | Apps | (Gls) |
| 2011–2014 | Tokyo University of Agriculture | | |

Senior career*
| Years | Team | Apps | (Gls) |
| 2015–2017 | JPV Marikina | 25 | (10) |
| 2018 | Davao Aguilas | 10 | (2) |
| 2019–2020 | Ceres–Negros / United City | 20 | (3) |
| 2021 | Maziya | 3 | (0) |
| 2022– | Preah Khan Reach Svay Rieng | 102 | (11) |
- * Club domestic league appearances and goals as of 9 November 2026

Takashi Odawara (小田原 貴, Odawara Takashi; born 3 December 1992) is a Japanese professional footballer who plays as a defender for Cambodian League club Preah Khan Reach Svay Rieng.

== Career ==
Odawara enjoyed a brief spell in the Philippines, for clubs such as JPV Marikina, Davao Aguilas, and United City (formerly Ceres–Negros). He was signed in by Ceres–Negros in 2019, and helped the club win the 2019 league and cup titles. He made his AFC Champions League debut in the playoff against Burmese side Shan United.

Odawara won the 2019 Copa Paulino Alcantara Golden Ball for his defensive performance.
