= Risto Vidaković =

Association football manager and former player

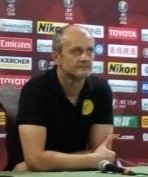
- Vidaković as Ceres–Negros manager in 2018

Personal information
- Full name: Risto Vidaković
- Date of birth: 5 January 1969 (age 57)
- Place of birth: Šekovići, SR Bosnia and Herzegovina, SFR Yugoslavia
- Height: 1.83 m (6 ft 0 in)
- Position: Centre-back

Team information
- Current team: PSIM Yogyakarta (head coach)

Youth career
- Eintracht Frankfurt
- 1987–1988: Sarajevo

Senior career*
Years	Team	Apps	(Gls)
1988–1992	Sarajevo	60	(4)
1992–1994	Red Star Belgrade	64	(17)
1994–2000	Betis	120	(6)
2000–2001	Osasuna	19	(0)
2001–2002	Poli Ejido	14	(0)
Total		277	(27)

International career
1991	Yugoslavia	1	(0)
1996–1998	FR Yugoslavia	7	(0)

Managerial career
- 2006–2007: Serbia (assistant)
- 2008–2009: Murcia (assistant)
- 2009–2010: Écija
- 2010: Cádiz
- 2011–2012: Betis B
- 2013: Motagua
- 2016–2020: Ceres–Negros
- 2021: Maziya
- 2021–2022: Borneo Samarinda
- 2022: Melaka United
- 2023: Lion City Sailors
- 2023–2024: PSS Sleman
- 2025–2026: Kuala Lumpur City
- 2026–: PSIM Yogyakarta
- * Club domestic league appearances and goals

Risto Vidaković (Serbian Cyrillic: Pиcтo Bидaкoвић; born 5 January 1969) is a Serbian professional football manager and former player. He is currently the head coach of the Indonesia Super League club, PSIM Yogyakarta.

Vidaković spent his playing career as a centre-back for Yugoslav clubs Sarajevo and Red Star Belgrade before moving to Spain, where he spent five seasons with Real Betis in La Liga, and a season each for Osasuna and Poli Ejido. Internationally, he represented Yugoslavia and FR Yugoslavia.

After retiring as a player, Vidaković became an assistant coach for the Serbia national team and Segunda División side Murcia. He was then head coach for Segunda División B clubs Écija, Cádiz, and the Real Betis reserve team. With Filipino club Ceres–Negros, he won three consecutive Philippines Football League titles. He also won a Dhivehi Premier League title with Maziya.

== Club career ==
Vidaković was born in Šekovići, SR Bosnia and Herzegovina, which was then a republic within SFR Yugoslavia. He started his career at FK Sarajevo, and played in the last edition of the Yugoslav First League, appearing in 13 games as the Bosnian team finished in ninth position. Subsequently, he signed for national giants Red Star Belgrade, and competed in the inaugural season of the Serbian-Montenegrin tournament, scoring a career-best 12 goals in his second year but eventually leaving the capital side without any silverware won.

In 1994, Vidaković joined Real Betis in Spain, which had just returned from the second division. In his first year in La Liga he appeared in 30 matches and netted twice as the Andalusians overachieved a third-place finish. He rarely missed a game in his first three seasons there.

Also at Betis, Vidaković suffered a serious injury from which he never fully recovered, leaving the club in 2000 after its top flight relegation. He joined another team in the country, CA Osasuna, which had moved in the opposite direction, then saw out his career at 33 after playing one year with Polideportivo Ejido.

== International career ==
Vidaković played once for Yugoslavia, appearing in a 1–3 friendly loss with Brazil on 30 October 1991. He then contributed with five matches as FR Yugoslavia qualified for the first time ever to an international tournament, the 1998 FIFA World Cup in France, but was eventually omitted from the final squad. His final international was a January 1998 friendly match against Tunisia.

== Managerial career ==
Vidaković began his coaching career as an assistant to Javier Clemente, his former coach at Real Betis, who was appointed head coach of the Serbia national team in July 2006. When Clemente became coach of Real Murcia in March 2008, Vidaković was again his assistant. In the following years, Vidaković returned to Andalusia and started his head coach career with third-tier teams Écija Balompié, Cádiz and Real Betis B. In 2013, he coached Honduran club Motagua.

=== Ceres–Negros ===
On 5 July 2016, Vidaković was appointed head coach of Filipino club Ceres–Negros for the second round of the 2016 United Football League (UFL), replacing Ali Go. His first match in charge was a 2–1 loss to Green Archers United on 7 August. His first win as Ceres' coach was an 11–0 thrashing of Forza on 14 September. In their penultimate match of the season, they defeated their title rivals Global 5–0. However, Global were still ahead by six points and Ceres finished the season as runners-up.

In 2016, Ceres were also participating in the Singapore Cup. At the time of Vidaković's appointment, the team had made it to the semi-finals. In the 80th minute of the first leg, Vidaković was sent off after continually complaining to the officials. Suspended from the second leg, technical director Ali Go filled in for him as Ceres were eliminated by Tampines Rovers on 5–3 aggregate.

In the 2017 pre-season, Vidaković recruited Spanish defender Súper, who played under him at Betis B. In the 2017 AFC Cup, Ceres topped their group by beating S.League runners-up Tampines Rovers and Vietnamese champions Hà Nội. They then went on to defeat Malaysian champions Johor Darul Ta'zim in the ASEAN zonal semifinal, and Singapore's Home United in the zonal final, thus winning the ASEAN Zone. In the Inter-zone play-off semi-finals, they faced Tajikistan's Istiklol, winners of the Central Asia Zone, losing 5–1 on aggregate; this was the furthest the club has reached in the AFC Cup.

In the Philippines Football League (PFL), which replaced the UFL, Ceres faced Kaya on 6 May for the new league's first ever match which ended in a 1–1 draw. Before kickoff in an away match against Global Cebu on 5 July, Vidaković complained about the uneven pitch. He was later sent off in the 56th minute after expressing his frustrations at the match officials. Ceres lost the match 1–0. On 14 October, in another match against Kaya, Vidaković was sent off after arguing with the officials for what he believed was an uncalled foul that led to a Kaya goal. The match ended in a 3–2 win for Ceres. Their 24 November match against league leaders Meralco Manila ended in a goalless draw, thus failing to overcome their one-point deficit. In their final match of the regular season, they were defeated by Global Cebu 2–0, sealing their second-seed finish with 57 points from 17 wins, 6 draws, and 5 losses. In the post-season playoffs, they defeated Kaya in the semifinals before beating Global 4–1 in the final, winning the league's inaugural title.

In the 2018 pre-season, after first-choice goalkeeper Roland Müller went on leave, Vidaković recruited former Betis goalkeeper Toni Doblas. As the previous season's league champions, Ceres were set to play in the AFC Champions League qualifying play-offs for the first time in their history. After beating Burmese champions Shan United on penalties, Vidaković's side managed an upset away win against Australia's Brisbane Roar. However, they failed to progress to the group stage after falling to China's Tianjin Quanjian in the final play-off round. Relegated to the AFC Cup, Ceres thrashed Cambodian champions Boeung Ket 9–0 in their opening group match—one of the largest margins of victory in AFC Cup history. In a rematch of the previous season's ASEAN zonal final, Ceres lost to Home United 3–1 on aggregate.

In the PFL, Ceres–Negros started their season with a five-match winning streak, which was ended by a 2–0 home loss to Kaya on 12 May. On 12 August, during a home match against Davao Aguilas, he was sent off after confronting the referee for what he saw as an uncalled foul on goalkeeper Toni Doblas by Davao's James Younghusband. Ceres lost the match 3–0. Vidaković's Ceres side ended the season with 19 wins, 3 draws, and 3 losses—successfully defending their league title. Unlike the previous season, the 2018 PFL was a pure round-robin tournament.

He later led the club in the Philippines Football League until 8 July 2020 being force Majeure.

=== Maziya ===
On 3 January 2021, Vidaković was announced as the new manager of Maldivian club Maziya in the Dhivehi Premier League. He won his first match with the club on 10 January, beating Super United Sports 3–0. Maziya won the 2020–21 league title without a single loss.

=== Borneo Samarinda ===
On 3 October 2021, Vidaković was recruited by Liga 1 club Borneo Samarinda however on 20 January 2022, he resigned from the club.

=== Melaka United ===
On 22 January 2022, Vidaković signed for Malaysia Super League club Melaka United. He bought in Emmanuel Oti, Ifedayo Olusegun and Justin Baas to strengthen the squad however, his contract was terminated on 13 April 2022.

=== Kuala Lumpur City (2025) ===
Kuala Lumpur City has officially confirmed the appointment of Serbian tactician Risto Vidakovic as the club’s new head coach ahead of the 2025/26 season. The announcement was made via the club’s official social media platforms, accompanied by a message that reflects high optimism and a bold vision. He replaces fellow countryman Miroslav Kuljanac, with whom he shares a similar coaching pedigree. Prior to the official appointment, regional football icon Fandi Ahmad was among the names linked to the KL City job.

== Managerial statistics ==
As of match played 6 November 2026

Managerial record by team and tenure
Team	Nat.	From	To	Record					Ref.
Team	Nat.	From	To	G	W	D	L	Win %	Ref.
Écija	(Spain)	1 July 2009	9 July 2010	38	15	7	16	39.47	
Cádiz	(Spain)	9 July 2010	14 November 2010	16	9	1	6	56.25	
Betis B	(Spain)	1 July 2011	3 October 2012	44	19	7	18	43.18	
Motagua	(Honduras)	1 July 2013	31 December 2013	18	5	6	7	27.78	
Ceres–Negros	(Philippines)	18 July 2016	12 August 2020	138	91	21	26	65.94	
Maziya	(Maldives)	3 January 2021	1 October 2021	13	8	2	3	61.54	
Borneo	(Indonesia)	3 October 2021	20 January 2022	14	7	2	5	50.00	
Melaka United	(Malaysia)	22 January 2022	12 April 2022	5	1	1	3	20.00	
Lion City Sailors	(Singapore)	1 January 2023	18 June 2023	14	9	3	2	64.29	
PSS Sleman	(Indonesia)	16 November 2023	27 June 2024	15	5	4	6	33.33	
Kuala Lumpur City	(Malaysia)	1 July 2025	30 June 2026	32	15	8	9	46.88	
PSIM Yogyakarta	(Indonesia)	2 November 2026	Present	1	0	0	1	0.00	
Career Total				348	184	62	102	52.87	

== Honours ==
=== Player ===
Red Star Belgrade

- FR Yugoslavia Cup: 1992–93

=== Manager ===
Ceres–Negros

- Philippines Football League: 2017, 2018, 2019

Maziya

- Dhivehi Premier League: 2020–21
