= Aboitiz Pitch =

- Interactive map of Aboitiz Pitch
- Location: Lipa, Batangas, Philippines
- Coordinates: 14.0076°N 121.1702°E
- Owner: Lima Land Inc.
- Capacity: 1,500
- Surface: Artificial grass
- Field size: 106 x 92m

Construction
- Opened: August 2018

Tenant
- Fuerza FC

Website
- www.outletsatlipa.com.ph/aboitiz-pitch

The Aboitiz Pitch at The Outlets is a multi-sport venue in Lipa, Batangas, Philippines.

== Background ==
The Aboitiz Pitch with a 1,500 seating capacity is part of The Outlets at Lipa retail development of Lima Land Inc., a company under Aboitiz Equity Ventures. The venue situated 297 meters (974 ft) above sea level is designed by WTA Architecture + Design Studio. It opened in June 2018.

The pitch measuring 106 m × 92 m (348 ft × 302 ft), can be utilized to play multiple sports including football. The venue uses Limonta Infinity as its artificial grass surface and could be converted to two 88 m × 51 m (289 ft × 167 ft) fields for recreational football or a 102 m × 68 m (335 ft × 223 ft) for full regulation play.

== Tenants ==
The Aboitiz Football Cup held its first edition in Luzon in October 2018 in the Aboitiz Pitch at Lipa.

Green Archers United of the Philippines Football League (PFL) used the facility as their home venue with their 4–0 win over Philippine Air Force on August 4, 2019, as their first official home match at the venue. Other matches of the PFL were also played in the venue with the August 3, 2019 tie between Mendiola and Global Makati being the first league match held at the venue. Mendiola won 4–0 in that match.
