= 2015 UFL Cup =

2015 United Football Cup
Tournament details
- Country: Philippines
- Dates: May 2 – August 28
- Teams: 20

Final positions
- Champions: Kaya F.C. (1st title)
- Runners-up: Ceres F.C.

Tournament statistics
- Matches played: 54
- Goals scored: 288 (5.33 per match)
- Top goal scorer(s): (Saint Kitts and Nevis) Tishan Hanley (15 goals)

The 2015 United Football League Cup is the sixth edition of the United Football League Cup which started on May 2 and ended on August 28, 2015. This edition was supposed to be held in 2014 but the kick off was moved to 2015 with the main objective to eventually align league schedules with ASEAN neighbors.

Loyola Meralco Sparks are the defending champions.

The 20 teams which participated at the tournament were distributed into four groups for the group stage. All group stage matches will take place at the Rizal Memorial Stadium.

Kaya were crowned champions and qualified for a play-off spot at the 2016 AFC Cup.

== Group stage ==
Tiebreakers

The teams are ranked according to points (3 points for a win, 1 point for a draw, 0 points for a loss). If tied on points, tiebreakers are applied in the following order:

1. Goal difference in all the group matches;
2. Greater number of goals scored in all the group matches;
3. If, after applying criteria 1 and 2, teams still have an equal ranking, criteria 1 and 2 are reapplied exclusively to the matches between the teams in question to determine their final rankings. If this procedure does not lead to a decision, criteria 4 to 8 apply;
4. Penalty shoot-out if only two teams are involved and they are both on the field of play;
5. Fewest red cards
6. Fewest yellow cards
7. Team who belongs to the member association with the higher AFC ranking.
8. Drawing of lots, coin toss or play-off match as determined by the Executive Committee

=== Group A ===
Team	Pld	W	D	L	GF	GA	GD	Pts
Ceres	4	4	0	0	24	2	+22	12
Green Archers United	4	3	0	1	14	4	+10	9
Pasargad	4	2	0	2	5	11	−6	6
Philippine Army	4	1	0	3	5	9	−4	3
Bright Star	4	0	0	4	2	24	−22	0

May 2, 2015
13:45

Philippine Army	4–1	Bright Star
Brillantes 13'; Benitez 62', 72'; Bedua 87'	Report	Adams 61'

Rizal Memorial Stadium, Manila
May 2, 2015
16:00

Ceres	4–0	Pasargad
Panhay 17'; Steuble 38'; Lee Jeong Woo 53'; Jal. Soriano 87'	Report

Rizal Memorial Stadium, Manila

May 5, 2015
18:15

Ceres	2–1	Philippine Army
Lee Jeong Woo 19'; Steuble 65'	Report	Benitez 66'

Rizal Memorial Stadium, Manila
May 5, 2015
20:30

Bright Star	0–4	Green Archers United
	Report	Del Rio 11'; Pasilan 43'; Diamante 80'; Simpron 86'

Rizal Memorial Stadium, Manila

May 10, 2015
18:15

Pasargad	0–6	Green Archers United
	Report	Pasilan 3'; Caligdong 17'; Reynald Villareal 22'; Mendy 53', 60'; Chaffort 90+2'

Rizal Memorial Stadium, Manila
May 10, 2015
20:30

Bright Star	0–14	Ceres
	Report	Kama 4', 17'; Panhay 6', 22'; Gallardo 13', 27'; Steuble 31'; Burkey 42', 90+1'; Lee Jeong Woo 46', 61', 63', 75'; Angeles 88'

Rizal Memorial Stadium, Manila

May 17, 2015
13:45

Pasargad	2–1	Bright Star
Ogochukwu 43' (pen.), 61' (pen.)	Report	Yao 77'

Rizal Memorial Stadium, Manila
May 17, 2015
16:00

Green Archers United	3–0 (awarded)	Philippine Army

Rizal Memorial Stadium, Manila

May 23, 2015
18:15

Green Archers United	1–4	Ceres
Mendy 3'	Report	Lee Jeong Woo 63'; Bienvenido Marañón 64'; Gallardo 69'; Christiaens 81'

Rizal Memorial Stadium, Manila
May 23, 2015
20:30

Philippine Army	0–3 (awarded)	Pasargad
	Report

Rizal Memorial Stadium, Manila
- Philippine Army withdrew from the UFL Cup. Their matches against Green Archers United and Pasargad were designated as 0–3 defeats and 3 points were awarded to Philippine Army's remaining two oppositions.
- Bright Star qualify as the result of Army's withdrawal, they also withdrew from the tournament without playing a single game at the round of 16 resulting UST to take its place.

=== Group B ===
Team	Pld	W	D	L	GF	GA	GD	Pts
Kaya	4	4	0	0	26	0	+26	12
Pachanga Diliman	4	3	0	1	16	4	+12	9
Agila MSA	4	2	0	2	9	17	−8	6
Team Socceroo	4	1	0	3	6	14	−8	3
Fleet Marine	4	0	0	4	1	23	−22	0

May 2, 2015
18:15

Team Socceroo	2–1	Fleet Marine
Cleopas 18', 90+5'	Report	Brown 34' (pen.)

Rizal Memorial Stadium, Manila
May 2, 2015
20:30

Kaya	7–0	Agila MSA
Beloya 26', 42'; Daniels 28'; Hanley 53', 63'; Jan. Soriano 85'; Barrera 89'	Report

Rizal Memorial Stadium, Manila

May 9, 2015
13:45

Kaya	5–0	Team Socceroo
Clark 9'; Omura 13'; Hanley 30', 90'; Porteria 85'	Report

Rizal Memorial Stadium, Manila
May 9, 2015
16:00

Fleet Marine	0–5	Pachanga Diliman
	Report	Valmayor 19', 42'; Hajimahdi 28', 79'; Corina 73'

Rizal Memorial Stadium, Manila

May 12, 2015
18:15

Agila MSA	0–7	Pachanga Diliman
	Report	Hajimahdi 26', 52', 63'; Permanes 31'; Doustdarsefidmazgi 47'; Valmayor 60'; Silitonga 79'

Rizal Memorial Stadium, Manila
May 12, 2015
20:30

Fleet Marine	0–11	Kaya
	Report	Clark 10', 47', 58', 65', 71', 90'; Porteria 70', 90+2'; Daniels 75'; Hanley 81', 88'

Rizal Memorial Stadium, Manila

May 17, 2015
18:15

Agila MSA	5–0	Fleet Marine
Clottey 14'; Bakare 19', 55'; Narca 34'; Kone 69'	Report

Rizal Memorial Stadium, Manila
May 17, 2015
20:30

Pachanga Diliman	4–1	Team Socceroo
Doustdarsefidmazgi 52', 73'; Permanes 69'; Hajimahdi 74'	Report	Lunag 27'

Rizal Memorial Stadium, Manila

May 24, 2015
13:45

Pachanga Diliman	0–3	Kaya
	Report	Hanley 6'; Clark 10'; Barrera 80'

Rizal Memorial Stadium, Manila
May 24, 2015
16:00

Team Socceroo	3–4	Agila MSA
Shadideh 8'; Rech 68', 80'	Report	Olayemi Bakare 34', 54' (pen.), 61'; Clottey 52'

Rizal Memorial Stadium, Manila

=== Group C ===
Team	Pld	W	D	L	GF	GA	GD	Pts
Loyola	4	3	1	0	20	3	+17	10
Stallion	4	3	1	0	14	2	+12	10
JP Voltes	4	2	0	2	11	10	+1	6
Mendiola	4	0	1	3	4	15	−11	1
UST	4	0	1	3	2	21	−19	1

May 3, 2015
13:45

JP Voltes	7–0	UST
Kobayashi 3', 21', 69', 89'; Kamon 7', 34', 67'	Report

Rizal Memorial Stadium, Manila
May 3, 2015
16:00

Stallion	4–1	Mendiola
Mintah 9', 15', 25'; J. Borromeo 69'	Report	Tacagni 57'

Rizal Memorial Stadium, Manila

May 9, 2015
18:15

Loyola	1–1	Stallion
P. Younghusband 8'	Report	Doctora 65'

Rizal Memorial Stadium, Manila
May 9, 2015
20:30

JP Voltes	2–1	Mendiola
Kobayashi 61'; Nakagaito 79'	Report	Jim Flores 37'

Rizal Memorial Stadium, Manila

May 16, 2015
13:45

Mendiola	0–7	Loyola
	Report	Caygill 17', 68'; J. Younghusband 49'; Dizon 74', 82'; Putrus-Schnell 78' del Rosario 90+1'

Rizal Memorial Stadium, Manila
May 16, 2015
16:00

UST	0–5	Stallion
	Report	Doctora 22'; Mbata 37'; Rota 73' (pen.); H. Borromeo 82'; Boblo 90+1'

Rizal Memorial Stadium, Manila

May 19, 2015
18:15

Mendiola	2–2	UST
Dorimon 2'; Pedimonte 12'	Report	Bronda 74'; Molino 89'

Rizal Memorial Stadium, Manila
May 19, 2015
20:30

Loyola	5–2	JP Voltes
Minniecon 36', 41'; P. Younghusband 57', 59', 83'	Report	Kobayashi 25', 74'

Rizal Memorial Stadium, Manila

May 24, 2015
18:15

Stallion	4–0	JP Voltes
Nana 55'; Mbata 59' (90+?); J. Borromeo 62'	Report

Rizal Memorial Stadium, Manila
May 24, 2015
20:30

UST	0–7	Loyola
	Report	Caygill 46'; Bustillo 48', 54'; P. Younghusband 84', 88'; Minniecon 85'; Beaton 87'

Rizal Memorial Stadium, Manila

=== Group D ===
Team	Pld	W	D	L	GF	GA	GD	Pts
Global	4	4	0	0	23	3	+20	12
Manila Jeepney	4	3	0	1	18	8	+10	9
Forza	4	1	1	2	6	11	−5	4
Laos	4	1	0	3	10	12	−2	3
Manila Nomads	4	0	1	3	3	26	−23	1

May 3, 2015
18:15

Laos	7–1	Manila Nomads
Franksson 2', 44'; Jafary 6', 20'; Camara 27', 79'; Elhabib 85'	Report	William 17'

Rizal Memorial Stadium, Manila
May 3, 2015
20:30

Global	4–1	Forza
Mark Hartmann 10', 76'; Suzuki 20'; Minegishi 74'	Report	J. Johnson 90+2'

Rizal Memorial Stadium, Manila

May 10, 2015
13:45

Manila Jeepney	1–4	Global
Kouassi 30'	Report	Mark Hartmann 7'; Hoshide 12'; Clarino 43'; El Habbib 75'

Rizal Memorial Stadium, Manila
May 10, 2015
16:00

Laos	0–1	Forza
	Report	J. Johnson 11'

Rizal Memorial Stadium, Manila

May 16, 2015
18:15

Forza	2–5	Manila Jeepney
Tetang Zeipop 6'; J. Johnson 67'	Report	Kouassi 29', 53', 87'; Alonso 32'; Giganto 69'

Rizal Memorial Stadium, Manila
May 16, 2015
20:30

Manila Nomads	0–10	Global
	Report	El Habbib 26'; Mark Hartmann 45+2', 60', 71', 72', 77', 90+2'; Suzuki 62', 81'; Sato 90'

Rizal Memorial Stadium, Manila

May 23, 2015
13:45

Global	5–1	Laos
Mark Hartmann 12', 36', 41' (pen.); Bahadoran 55'; El Habbib 83'	Report	Jafary 6', 65'

Rizal Memorial Stadium, Manila
May 23, 2015
16:00

Manila Nomads	0–7	Manila Jeepney
	Report	Kouassi 9', 30' (pen.); Giganto 44'; Alonso 69'; Amita 74'; Lord 88', 90'

Rizal Memorial Stadium, Manila

May 26, 2015
18:15

Forza	2–2	Manila Nomads
Zeipop 60'; Belgira 61'	Report	Custodio 21', 62'

Rizal Memorial Stadium, Manila
May 26, 2015
20:30

Manila Jeepney	5–2	Laos
Kouassi 25'; Epesso 39'; Safarian (?); Giganto (?); Menzi (?)	Report	Altiche 31'; Franksson 47'

Rizal Memorial Stadium, Manila
- Global was disqualified from the UFL Cup for fielding Satoshi Ōtomo as a Filipino player and ruled the club has violated the UFL's five-foreigner-rule. Matches of Global were originally decided to be forfeited after complaints from Ceres La-Salle FC, Kaya FC, Stallion FC, and Pachanga Diliman FC but the decision was overturn after the Appeals Committee ruled that the complainants did not follow proper procedure for reversing match outcomes. Last placers, Manila Nomads qualifies for the next round as a result.

== Knock-out stage ==
The Knock-out stage is set to begin on August 13 and will end on August 28.

Round of 16
August 13
Kaya	10
Manila Nomads	1
August 18
Pasargad	1
JP Voltes	2
August 16
Stallion	8
Team Socceroo	0
August 16
Laos	0
Pachanga Diliman	2
August 15
UST	0
Ceres	7
August 18
Green Archers Utd.	3
Agila MSA	0
August 15
Mendiola	0
Loyola	5
August 13
Manila Jeepney	2
Forza	0

Quarter-finals
August 21
Kaya	8
JP Voltes	0
August 22
Stallion	5
Pachanga Diliman	0
August 21
Ceres	5
Green Archers Utd.	0
August 22
Loyola	3
Manila Jeepney	0

Semi-finals
August 25
Kaya	3 (a.e.t.)
Stallion	3
August 25
Ceres	1
Loyola	0

Final
August 28
Kaya	2 (a.e.t.)
Ceres	2

=== Round of 16 ===
August 13, 2015
17:15

Manila Jeepney	2-0	Forza
Joshua Mullero 30'; Arnel Amita 90'

Rizal Memorial Stadium, Manila
August 13, 2015
20:15

Kaya	10-1	Manila Nomads
Porteria 1', 28', 51'; Hanley 10', 11', 42', 80'; Barrera 38'; Borromeo 76'; Greatwich 84'		Federico Rabaya 84'

Rizal Memorial Stadium, Manila

August 15, 2015
17:15

UST	0-7	Ceres
		Bienvenido Marañon 10', 42'; Lee Jeong Woo 53', 59'; Patrick Reichelt 61', 72'; Karl Bronda 81' (o.g.)

Rizal Memorial Stadium, Manila
August 15, 2015
20:15

Mendiola	0-5	Loyola
		Anthony Putrus-Schnell 23', 36'; Bradley Grayson 73'; Graham Caygill 78', 90'

Rizal Memorial Stadium, Manila

August 16, 2015
17:15

Stallion	8-0	Team Socceroo
Jordan Mintah 5', 29', 75', 80'; Ruben Doctora 11'; Ian Araneta 31'; Christian Nana 32'; Emmanuel Mbata 58'

Rizal Memorial Stadium, Manila
August 16, 2015
20:15

Laos	0-2	Pachanga Diliman
		Hossein Doustdarsefidmazgi 46'; Davide Cortina 52'

Rizal Memorial Stadium, Manila

August 18, 2015
17:15

Green Archers United	3-0 (default)	Agila MSA

Rizal Memorial Stadium, Manila
August 18, 2015
20:15

Pasargad	1-2	JP Voltes
Fidelis Nnabuife 13'	Report	Takashi Odawara 18'; Soichiro Tanaka 37'

Rizal Memorial Stadium, Manila

=== Quarterfinals ===
August 21, 2015
17:15

Kaya	8-0	JP Voltes
Hanley 30', 37', 42'; Alfred Osei 31'; Daniels 62'; Janrick Soriano 69', 72'; Greatwich 90+2'

Rizal Memorial Stadium, Manila
August 21, 2015
20:15

Ceres	5-0	Green Archers Utd.
Lee Jeong Woo 36'; Patrick Reichelt 38', 74'; Manuel Ott 53'; Bienvenido Marañon 79'

Rizal Memorial Stadium, Manila

August 22, 2015
17:15

Loyola	3-0	Manila Jeepney
Phil Younghusband 35'; Joaquín Cañas 37'; Anton del Rosario 90+2'

Rizal Memorial Stadium, Manila
August 22, 2015
20:15

Stallion	5-0	Pachanga Diliman
Ruben Doctora 16'; Jordan Mintah 22', 43', 56'; Fitch Arboleda 33'

Rizal Memorial Stadium, Manila

=== Semifinals ===
August 25, 2015
17:15

Kaya	3-3 (a.e.t.)	Stallion
Alfred Osei 56'; Porteria 61'; Barrera 102'		Rota 35'; Shirmar Felongco 54'; Jordan Mintah 101'
Penalties
Porteria (penalty scored); Borromeo (penalty scored); Daniels (penalty scored); Barrera (penalty scored); Louis Clark (penalty scored)	5–4	(penalty missed) Araneta; (penalty scored) Nathanael Alquiros; (penalty scored) Bervic Italia; (penalty scored) Basa; (penalty scored) Doctora

Rizal Memorial Stadium, Manila
August 25, 2015
20:15

Ceres	1-0	Loyola
Orman Okunaiya 70'

Rizal Memorial Stadium, Manila

=== Third place playoff ===
August 28, 2015
17:15

Stallion	2-4	Loyola

Rizal Memorial Stadium, Manila

=== Final ===
August 28, 2015
20:15

Kaya	2-2 (a.e.t.)	Ceres
Hanley 45'; Barrera 56'	Report	Lee Jeong-Woo 63'; Guirado 73'
Penalties
(penalty scored) Porteria; (penalty scored) Borromeo; (penalty missed) Daniels; (penalty scored) Ayew; (penalty scored) Clark	4–2	(penalty scored) Marañón; (penalty scored) Lee; (penalty missed) Mulders; (penalty missed) Steuble

Rizal Memorial Stadium, Manila

== Awards ==
Award	Winner	Club
Golden Ball	(Japan) Masanari Omura	Kaya
Golden Boot	(Saint Kitts and Nevis) Tishan Hanley	Kaya
Golden Glove	(Philippines) Louie Casas	Ceres
Fair Play Award	Stallion	

== Statistics ==
=== Tournament team rankings ===
Note: As per statistical convention in football, matches decided in extra time are counted as wins and losses, while matches decided by penalty shoot-outs are counted as draws.

Pos	Grp	Team	Pld	W	D	L	GF	GA	GD	Pts	Result
1	B	Kaya	8	6	2	0	49	6	+43	20	1st
2	A	Ceres	8	7	1	0	39	4	+35	22	2nd
3	C	Loyola Meralco Sparks	8	6	1	1	32	6	+26	19	3rd
4	C	Stallion	8	5	2	1	32	9	+23	17	4th
5	D	Manila Jeepney	6	4	0	2	20	11	+9	12	Eliminated in the quarter-finals
6	B	Pachanga Diliman	6	4	0	2	18	9	+9	12	Eliminated in the quarter-finals
7	A	Green Archers United	6	4	0	2	17	9	+8	12	Eliminated in the quarter-finals
8	C	JP Voltes	6	3	0	3	13	19	−6	9	Eliminated in the quarter-finals
9	A	Pasargad	5	2	0	3	6	13	−7	6	Eliminated in the round of 16
10	B	Agila MSA	5	2	0	3	9	20	−11	6	Eliminated in the round of 16
11	D	Forza	5	1	1	3	6	13	−7	4	Eliminated in the round of 16
12	D	Laos	5	1	0	4	10	14	−4	3	Eliminated in the round of 16
13	B	Team Socceroo	5	1	0	4	6	22	−16	3	Eliminated in the round of 16
14	C	Mendiola	5	0	1	4	4	20	−16	1	Eliminated in the round of 16
15	C	UST	5	0	1	4	2	28	−26	1	Eliminated in the round of 16
16	D	Manila Nomads	5	0	1	4	4	36	−32	1	Eliminated in the round of 16
17	D	Global	4	4	0	0	23	3	+20	12	Eliminated in the group stage
18	A	Philippine Army	4	1	0	3	5	9	−4	3	Eliminated in the group stage
19	A	Bright Star	4	0	0	4	2	24	−22	0	Eliminated in the group stage
20	B	Fleet Marine	4	0	0	4	1	23	−22	0	Eliminated in the group stage
