= 2016 United Football League =

United Football League
- Season: 2016
- Champions: Global
- AFC Cup: Global; Ceres
- Matches: 102
- Goals: 544 (5.33 per match)
- Best player: (Japan) Hikaru Minegishi
- Top goalscorer: (Spain) Adrián Gallardo (30 goals)
- Best goalkeeper: (Philippines) Nelson Gasic
- Highest scoring: 17 goals Kaya 16–1 Manila Nomads
- Longest winning run: 10 games Global
- Longest unbeaten run: 15 games Global
- Longest winless run: 11 games Pasargad
- Longest losing run: 8 games Pasargad

The 2016 United Football League was the seventh and last season of the UFL since its establishment as a semi-professional league in 2009. Division 2 is disbanded for this season with all teams competing in one division.

The league competition, which started on April 30 and ended on October 24, followed a pure double round robin match with no play-offs. For this edition the foreign player cap is reduced to four from five foreign players in a playing squad of 18 players, including 7 substitutes. At least one of the four maximum allowable foreign players must be from the Asian country. This was to align to the guidelines followed at the AFC Cup and AFC Champions League. However, a club with more than 25 players may have more than four foreign players in their whole squad provided that they comply with the 4-player foreign player limit rule during match day.

Global F.C. won the league with one game to spare.

The 2016 season was the last UFL season following the appointment of UFL President Randy Roxas as part of the task force for the upcoming Philippines Football League which had its inaugural season in 2017.

== Venue ==
Matches are played at the Rizal Memorial Stadium.

== Clubs ==
The league is composed of 12 clubs.

Club	Head coach	Captain	Kit manufacturer	Shirt sponsor
Agila	(Philippines) Richard Leyble	(Japan) Shinji Shozu	(Philippines) LGR Sportswear	None
Ceres	(Serbia) Risto Vidaković	(Philippines) Juan Luis Guirado	(Germany) Puma	(Philippines) Ceres Liner
Forza	(Philippines) Arvin Jay Soliman	(Philippines) Stephen Burda	(Philippines) LGR Sportswear	(Philippines) Orient Freight International
Global	(Scotland) Leigh Manson	(Philippines) Misagh Bahadoran	(Philippines) LGR Sportswear	None
Green Archers United	(Philippines) Rodolfo Alicante	(Philippines) Tating Pasilan	(Philippines) LGR Sportswear	(Philippines) Globe Telecom
JP Voltes	(Japan) Yu Hoshide	(Japan) Masaki Yanagawa	(Philippines) LGR Sportswear	(Japan) JK Mart
Kaya	(Philippines) Chris Greatwich	(Philippines) Alexander Borromeo	(Philippines) LGR Sportswear	(Philippines) LBC Express
Laos	(Philippines) Jovanie Villagracia	(Sudan) Badreldin Elhabib	(Philippines) LGR Sportswear	None
Loyola Meralco Sparks	(Scotland) Simon McMenemy	(Philippines) James Younghusband	(United States) Under Armour	(Philippines) Meralco
Manila Nomads	(Brazil) Ronaldo Luis Bernardo	(Nigeria) Ubiam Ugochukwu Okoro	(Philippines) LGR Sportswear	(Philippines) True Blue Tools
Pasargad	(Philippines) Joel Villarino	(Philippines) Jean Claude Delos Reyes	(Philippines) LGR Sportswear	None
Stallion	(Philippines) Ernest Nierras	(Philippines) Ruben Doctora	(United States) Vizari	(Philippines) Giligan's Restaurant

== Managerial changes ==
Team	Outgoing head coach	Manner of departure	Incoming head coach
Kaya	(Trinidad and Tobago) Fabien Larry Lewis	End of contract	(Philippines) Chris Greatwich
JP Voltes	(Japan) Shinichiro Maeno	End of contract	(Japan) Yu Hoshide
Laos	(Philippines) Rudy Del Rosario	End of contract	(Philippines) Jovanie Villagracia
Forza	(Philippines) Jun Mark Saraga	End of contract	(Philippines) Arvin Jay Soliman
Agila	(Philippines) Ramon Vicente Roxas	End of contract	(Philippines) Richard Leyble
Pasargad	(Philippines) Mike Agbayani	End of contract	(Philippines) Joel Villarino
Ceres	(Philippines) Ali Go	New coach under contract	(Serbia) Risto Vidaković

== League table ==
Pos	Team	Pld	W	D	L	GF	GA	GD	Pts	Qualification or relegation
1	Global (C)	19	15	2	2	80	15	+65	47	Qualification to the 2017 AFC Champions League Preliminary round 1 or 2017 AFC Cup Group stage (Note: Global qualified for the 2017 AFC Cup Group stage by winning the 2016 UFL Cup. However, since they already qualified for the 2017 AFC Champions League Preliminary round 1 by winning the 2016 UFL Division 1, the spot awarded to the cup winners was passed to the next best-placed team (2016 UFL Division 1 runner-up Ceres FC).)
2	Ceres (Q)	19	13	2	4	109	18	+91	41	Qualification to the 2017 AFC Cup Group stage
3	Loyola Meralco Sparks	19	13	2	4	83	23	+60	41	
4	JP Voltes	19	13	2	4	51	16	+35	41	
5	Kaya	19	12	1	6	78	25	+53	37	
6	Stallion	19	8	7	4	43	28	+15	31	
7	Green Archers United	19	6	3	10	29	48	−19	21	
8	Forza	19	4	2	13	20	82	−62	14	
9	Manila Nomads (D, E)	11	3	0	8	20	65	−45	9	Withdrew from the tournament (Note: Manila Nomads, Agila and Pasargad did not participate in the second round of the league.)
10	Laos	19	2	1	16	22	111	−89	7	
11	Agila (D, E)	11	1	1	9	6	56	−50	4	Withdrew from the tournament
12	Pasargad (D, E)	11	0	1	10	4	58	−54	1	Withdrew from the tournament

Updated to match(es) played on 24 October 2016. Source: rsssf.com, soccerway.com
Rules for classification: 1) Points; 2) Goal Difference; 3) Goals Scored
(C) Champions; (D) Disqualified; (E) Eliminated; (Q) Qualified for the phase indicated

== Positions by round ==
Team ╲ Round	1	2	3	4	5	6	7	8	9	10	11	12	13	14	15	16	17	18	19
Global	4	2	1	1	1	1	1	1	1	1	1	1	1	1	1	1	1	1	1
Ceres	8	6	4	3	2	2	2	2	2	2	2	2	3	2	3	2	2	2	2
Loyola Meralco Sparks	5	3	6	5	3	3	3	3	3	3	4	3	2	3	2	3	3	3	3
JP Voltes	2	1	5	4	5	5	5	4	4	4	3	4	4	4	4	4	4	4	4
Kaya	1	5	3	2	4	4	4	5	6	6	5	5	5	5	5	5	5	5	5
Stallion	9	10	7	7	6	6	7	6	5	5	6	6	6	6	6	6	6	6	6
Green Archers United	6	4	2	6	7	7	6	7	7	7	7	7	7	7	7	7	7	7	7
Forza	6	9	11	10	11	11	11	9	8	8	8	8	8	8	8	8	8	8	8
Manila Nomads	3	7	8	9	8	8	8	8	9	10	9	9	9	9	9	9	9	9	9
Laos	12	12	12	12	12	10	10	11	11	9	10	10	10	10	10	10	10	10	10
Agila	10	8	10	8	9	9	9	10	10	11	11	11	11	11	11	11	11	11	11
Pasargad	11	11	9	11	10	12	12	12	12	12	12	12	12	12	12	12	12	12	12

Leader
2017 AFC Cup group stage

Source: UFL League Table

== Results ==
Home \ Away	AGI	CER	FOR	GLO	GAU	JPV	KAY	LAO	LMS	NOM	PSG	STA
Agila						0–5	0–3	1–0	0–11		2–2	
Ceres	10–1		11–0	3–3	7–1	4–2	5–0	8–0	4–1	6–0		2–2
Forza	4–1	0–10		0–2	1–1	0–3	0–5	3–1	1–5		2–0	1–4
Global	8–0	0–5	12–0		4–0	0–2	3–2	8–0	1–0		3–0	3–0
Green Archers United	5–0	2–1	1–1	1–3		0–3	1–5	3–0	0–4		2–1	1–3
JP Voltes		1–0	7–1	0–4	3–1		0–1	3–0	2–3	5–0		0–0
Kaya		1–0	10–2	0–3	6–0	1–3		8–0	1–2	16–1		0–1
Laos		0–11	0–3	0–7	0–4	0–4	2–10		2–13	8–3		2–2
Loyola Meralco Sparks		3–2	4–0	0–0	2–1	1–2	0–1	11–1		9–2		3–1
Manila Nomads	3–0		2–1	0–12	3–4							2–4
Pasargad		0–16				0–6	0–6	1–6	0–9	0–4		
Stallion	5–1	1–4	3–0	2–4	1–1	0–0	2–2	8–0	2–2		2–0	

Source: United Football League (Philippines)
Legend: Blue = home team win; Yellow = draw; Red = away team win.

== Season statistics ==
=== Top goalscorers ===
Rank	Name	Team	Goals
1	(Spain) Adrián Gallardo	Ceres	30
2	(Philippines) Phil Younghusband	Loyola Meralco Sparks	21
3	(Philippines) Stephan Schröck	Ceres	18
3	(Senegal) Robert Lopez Mendy	Kaya	18
5	(Japan) Hikaru Minegishi	Global	17

=== Hat-tricks ===
Player	For	Against	Result	Date
(Philippines) Jay Baguioro	JP Voltes	Pasargad	0–6	30 April 2016
(Philippines) James Younghusband	Loyola Meralco Sparks	Stallion	3–1	8 May 2016
(Philippines) Nate Burkey	Ceres	Manila Nomads	6–0	14 May 2016
(Philippines) Jay Baguioro	JP Voltes	Forza	7–1	15 May 2016
(Japan) Takumi Uesato	JP Voltes	Forza	7–1	15 May 2016
(Senegal) Robert Lopez Mendy^{4}	Kaya	Forza	10–2	18 May 2016
(Philippines) Patrick Reichelt	Ceres	Agila	10–1	18 May 2016
(Spain) Bienve	Ceres	Agila	10–1	18 May 2016
(Philippines) Kenshiro Daniels^{4}	Kaya	Manila Nomads	16–1	9 June 2016
(Philippines) OJ Porteria^{4}	Kaya	Manila Nomads	16–1	9 June 2016
(Philippines) Joshua Beloya^{4}	Stallion	Laos	8–0	9 June 2016
(Spain) Adrián Gallardo^{8}	Ceres	Pasargad	0–16	11 June 2016
(Philippines) Stephan Schröck	Ceres	Pasargad	0–16	11 June 2016
(Philippines) Phil Younghusband	Loyola Meralco Sparks	Agila	0–11	15 June 2016
(Japan) Akira Miyayama	Loyola Meralco Sparks	Agila	0–11	15 June 2016
(Spain) Adrián Gallardo	Ceres	Forza	0–10	15 June 2016
(Philippines) Patrik Franksson^{4}	Laos	Pasargad	1– 6	19 June 2016
(Senegal) Robert Lopez Mendy	Kaya	Pasargad	0– 6	25 June 2016
(Philippines) Stephan Schröck	Ceres	Stallion	1–4	25 June 2016
(Philippines) Phil Younghusband^{5}	Loyola Meralco Sparks	Laos	2–13	26 June 2016
(Philippines) Curt Dizon	Loyola Meralco Sparks	Manila Nomads	9–2	3 July 2016
(Spain) Alvaro Castiella	Loyola Meralco Sparks	Manila Nomads	9–2	3 July 2016
(Spain) Carlos Ortiz ^{4}	Global	Agila	8–0	5 July 2016
(Philippines) Phil Younghusband	Loyola Meralco Sparks	Pasargad	0– 9	7 July 2016
(Spain) Adrián Gallardo^{6}	Ceres	Laos	0– 11	7 July 2016
(Philippines) Patrik Franksson^{5}	Laos	Manila Nomads	8–3	10 July 2016
(Ghana) Stephen Appiah	Manila Nomads	Laos	8–3	10 July 2016
(Philippines) Misagh Bahadoran^{5}	Global	Manila Nomads	0–12	14 July 2016
(Philippines) Phil Younghusband	Loyola Meralco Sparks	Forza	1– 5	7 August 2016
(Philippines) Omid Nazari	Global	Forza	12–0	10 August 2016
(Philippines) Misagh Bahadoran^{4}	Global	Forza	12–0	10 August 2016
(Japan) Hikaru Minegishi	Global	Forza	12–0	10 August 2016
(Philippines) Jorrel Aristorenas	Loyola Meralco Sparks	Laos	11–1	17 August 2016
(England) Louis Clark	Kaya	Laos	8–0	24 September 2016
(Philippines) Stephan Schröck	Ceres	Loyola Meralco Sparks	4–1	24 September 2016
(Philippines) Stephan Schröck	Ceres	Laos	8–0	28 September 2016
(Japan) Hikaru Minegishi	Global	Laos	0–7	2 October 2016
(Philippines) Matthew Hartmann	Global	Laos	0–7	2 October 2016

^{4} Player scored four goals
^{5} Player scored five goals
^{6} Player scored six goals
^{8} Player scored eight goals

=== Own goals ===
Player	For	Club	Own goals
(Philippines) Ronnie Aguisanda	Loyola Meralco Sparks	Green Archers United	2
(Philippines) Ronnie Aguisanda	JP Voltes	Green Archers United	2
(Cameroon) Christian Nana	Global	Stallion	1
(Philippines) Michael Atienza	Global	Laos	1
(Philippines) Jayson Cutamora	Global	JP Voltes	1
(Philippines) Rezziel Villaespin	Agila	Laos	1
(Philippines) John Lloyd Bastasa	Loyola Meralco Sparks	Laos	1
(Nigeria) Fidelis Nnabuife	Loyola Meralco Sparks	Manila Nomads	1
(Philippines) Joseph Rigoberto	Global	Forza	1

== Honors ==
Player

- Golden Boot: (Spain) Adrián Gallardo (Ceres)
- Golden Glove: (Philippines) Nelson Gasic (JP Voltes)
- Golden Ball: (Japan) Hikaru Minegishi (Global)
- Best Midfielder: (Philippines) Matthew Hartmann (Global)
- Best Defender: (Japan) Masaki Yanagawa (JP Voltes)

Team

- Fairplay: Stallion F.C.
