= 2016 UFL Cup =

2016 United Football Cup
Tournament details
- Country: Philippines
- Dates: February 6 – April 16
- Teams: 12

Final positions
- Champions: Global F.C. (2nd title)
- Runners-up: Ceres F.C.

Tournament statistics
- Matches played: 41
- Goals scored: 188 (4.59 per match)
- Top goal scorer(s): Robert Lopez Mendy (11 goals)

Awards
- Best player: Misagh Bahadoran

The 2016 United Football League Cup is the sixth edition of the United Football League Cup which started on February 6 and ended on April 9, 2016. There will be no guest teams with all competing teams also participating in the main UFL competition as per mandate by the Philippine Football Federation. All competing clubs also had to field teams for youth competitions to be organized by the UFL.

The cup adopted a single round robin format with two groups followed by a knockout stage composing of the quarterfinals, semifinals and the final. There is also a foreign player limit of five in the matchday squad of each clubs.

Kaya are the defending champions. Global won the 2016 UFL Cup defeating Ceres in the final.

== Draw ==
The draw for the group stage was held on January 20, 2016.

== Group stage ==
=== Group A ===
Pos	Team	Pld	W	D	L	GF	GA	GD	Pts	
1	Stallion	5	5	0	0	20	3	+17	15	Quarterfinal
2	Kaya	5	4	0	1	21	3	+18	12	Quarterfinal
3	JP Voltes	5	3	0	2	10	7	+3	9	Quarterfinal
4	Forza	5	2	0	3	6	17	−11	6	Quarterfinal
5	Agila	5	0	1	4	2	15	−13	1	
6	Laos	5	0	1	4	3	17	−14	1	

Source: UFL Philippines
February 6, 2016
16:00

Forza	1–0	Agila
Orcullo 85' (o.g.)	Report 1, 2

Rizal Memorial Stadium, Manila
February 6, 2016
20:30

JP Voltes	3–0	Laos
Odawara 19'; Espinosa 44'; Skinker 76'	Report

Rizal Memorial Stadium, Manila

February 7, 2016
18:15

Kaya	0–1	Stallion
	Report	Mintah 39'

Rizal Memorial Stadium, Manila

February 13, 2016
18:15

JP Voltes	2–1	Forza
Yanagawa 25', 56'		Mekong 9'

Rizal Memorial Stadium, Manila

February 14, 2016
16:00

Stallion	4–0	Agila
Nana 32'; Park 85'; Soberano 89'; Mintah 90+2'

Rizal Memorial Stadium, Manila
February 14, 2016
20:30

Kaya	6–1	Laos
Lopez Mendy 16', 41'; Bedic 77', 92'; Borromeo 79'; Del Rosario 84'		Altiche 21'

Rizal Memorial Stadium, Manila

February 18, 2016
18:15

Kaya	5–1	Agila
Borromeo 12'; Porteria 39' (pen.), 68'; Bedic 47'; Daniels 72'.		Jang 20'

Rizal Memorial Stadium, Manila

February 20, 2016
20:30

Stallion	2–1	JP Voltes
Flores 20'; Bonney 47'		Odawara 61'

Rizal Memorial Stadium, Manila

February 21, 2016
18:15

Laos	0–3 Awarded (Note: Laos FC defaults match for failure to comply with mandatory team requirements. Forza FC automatically wins 3-0 and gains three points.)	Forza

Rizal Memorial Stadium, Manila

February 27, 2016
18:15

JP Voltes	0–4	Kaya
		Lopez Mendy 5', 25', 48'; Bedic 83'

Rizal Memorial Stadium, Manila
Referee: Clifford Daypuyat (ZANDIFA)

February 28, 2016
16:00

Forza	1–9	Stallion
Italia 89' (o.g.)		Beloya 36'; Mintah 43', 50', 65', 78'; Tuason 55'; Doctora 61'; Flores 63'; Soberano 74'

Rizal Memorial Stadium, Manila
Referee: Clifford Daypuyat (ZANDIFA)
February 28, 2016
20:30

Agila	1–1	Laos
Alcoresa 87'		Hajimahdi 50'

Rizal Memorial Stadium, Manila
Referee: Aldous Mirafuentes (FAR)

March 3, 2016
20:30

Forza	0–6	Kaya
		Daniels 12', 68'; Lopez Mendy 26', 34', 59'; Muñoz 87'

Rizal Memorial Stadium, Manila
Referee: Linjun Talaver (NOFA)

March 4, 2016
18:15

Agila	0–4	JP Voltes
		Yanagawa 5'; Wada 41'; Nakazono 78'; Mahmoud 85'

Rizal Memorial Stadium, Manila
Referee: Aldous Mirafuentes (FAR)

March 5, 2016
18:15

Laos	1–4	Stallion
Hajimehdi 26'		Doctora 3', 24'; Mintah 12'; Bonney 17'

Rizal Memorial Stadium, Manila
Referee: Linjun Talaver (NOFA)

=== Group B ===
Pos	Team	Pld	W	D	L	GF	GA	GD	Pts	
1	Ceres	5	4	0	1	30	5	+25	12	Quarterfinal
2	Global	5	4	0	1	15	4	+11	12	Quarterfinal
3	Loyola Meralco Sparks	5	3	0	2	23	7	+16	9	Quarterfinal
4	Green Archers United	5	3	0	2	14	8	+6	9	Quarterfinal
5	Pasargad	5	1	0	4	6	26	−20	3	
6	Manila Nomads	5	0	0	5	0	38	−38	0	

Source: UFL Philippines
February 6, 2016
18:15

Pasargad	0–7	Global
	Report 1, 2	El-Habib 3'; Minegishi 15', 44'; Nazari 39', 61', 71'; Villanueva 79'

Rizal Memorial Stadium, Manila

February 7, 2016
16:00

Manila Nomads	0–4	Green Archers United
		Young 52'; Epesso 74'; Hossain 79'; Ariola 86'

Rizal Memorial Stadium, Manila
February 7, 2016
20:30

Loyola Meralco Sparks	1–2	Ceres
Valmayor 65'	Report	De Murga 34', 90+2'

Rizal Memorial Stadium, Manila
Referee: Clifford Daypuyat (ZANDIFA)

February 13, 2016
16:00

Global	0–3 Awarded (Note: Green Archers United awarded a 3-0 win against Global FC. Global fielded too many foreigners in the 18 man roster. The original score was 2–1 in favor of Global. The foreign players fielded by Global were Izo Elhabib, and Hikaru Minegishi as starters and Sean Bateau, Serge Kaole, Koffi Kouassi, and Milan Nikolic as bench players.)	Green Archers United
M. Hartmann 82'; Kouassi 90+4'		Epesso 27'

Rizal Memorial Stadium, Manila
February 13, 2016
20:30

Pasargad	1–7	Loyola Meralco Sparks
De Castro 44'		Castiella 15', 22', 56'; Minniecon 18', 39', 51'; J. Younghusband 54'

Rizal Memorial Stadium, Manila

February 14, 2016
18:15

Manila Nomads	0–15	Ceres
		Gallardo 3', 40'; Marañón 23', 43'; Schröck 27', 49'; Reichelt 34'; Steuble 35', 42', 84'; De Murga 39'; Burkey 59'; Lee 71', 74', 88'

Rizal Memorial Stadium, Manila

February 18, 2016
20:30

Pasargad	0–9	Ceres
		Gallardo 20', 50', 65', 71'; Schröck 26', 61', 87'; Ingreso 35'; Reichelt 47'

Rizal Memorial Stadium, Manila

February 20, 2016
18:15

Green Archers United	2–4	Loyola Meralco Sparks
Epesso 22'; Melliza 86'		Valmayor 7'; J. Younghusband 20'; Minniecon 70'; Morallo 72'

Rizal Memorial Stadium, Manila

February 21, 2016
20:30

Global	4–0	Manila Nomads
Kouassi 36', 57'; M. Hartmann 60', 81'

Rizal Memorial Stadium, Manila
Referee: Linjun Talaver (NOFA)

February 27, 2016
16:00

Ceres	3–2	Green Archers United
Schröck 17'; Lee 36'; Marañón 68'		Ariola 32'; Caligdong 75'

Rizal Memorial Stadium, Manila
Referee: Krizmark Nañola (QFA)
February 27, 2016
20:30

Loyola Meralco Sparks	0–2	Global
		Kouassi 42'; Nazari 52'

Rizal Memorial Stadium, Manila
Referee: Linjun Talaver (NOFA)

February 28, 2016
18:15

Manila Nomads	0–4	Pasargad
		Camara 4', 26'; Ebere 74'; De Castro 78'

Rizal Memorial Stadium, Manila
Referee: Krizmark Nañola (QFA)

March 3, 2016
18:15

Ceres	1–2	Global
Steuble 8'		Nikolic 36'; M. Hartmann 77'

Rizal Memorial Stadium, Manila
Referee: Clifford Daypuyat (ZANDIFA)

March 4, 2016
16:00

Green Archers United	3–1	Pasargad
Caligdong 5', 74'; Melliza 16'		Ebere 60'

Rizal Memorial Stadium, Manila
Referee: Krizmark Nañola (QFA)

March 5, 2016
18:15

Loyola Meralco Sparks	11–0	Manila Nomads
J. Younghusband 3', 26' (pen.); Castiella 18', 41', 73', 75', 81', 86'; De Jong 29', 45'; Morallo 84'

Rizal Memorial Stadium, Manila
Referee: Clifford Daypuyat (ZANDIFA)

== Knock-out stage ==
Plate
JP Voltes	0
Loyola Meralco Sparks	2
Plate SF Losing teams
Green Archers United	N/A
Forza	N/A

Plate Semifinals
Green Archers United	0
JP Voltes	1
Loyola Meralco Sparks	4
Forza	0

Quarterfinals
1A	Stallion	3
4B	Green Archers United	2
3A	JP Voltes	0
2B	Global	1
3B	Loyola Meralco Sparks	1
2A	Kaya	2
1B	Ceres	7
4A	Forza	0

Semifinals
Stallion	0
Global	2
Kaya	3(7) (a.e.t.)
Ceres	3(8)

Final
Global	3
Ceres	1
Third place
Stallion	1
Kaya	2

=== Quarterfinals ===
April 2, 2016
17:15

Stallion	3–2	Green Archers United
Rota 20'; Doctora 55'; Arboleda 88'		Caligdong 49', 90'

Rizal Memorial Stadium, Manila
Referee: Linjun Talaver (NOFA)
April 2, 2016
20:15

Loyola Meralco Sparks	1–2	Kaya
J. Younghusband 38'		Omura 73'; Lopez Mendy 90'

Rizal Memorial Stadium, Manila
Attendance: 476
Referee: Clifford Daypuyat (ZANDIFA)

April 3, 2016
17:15

JP Voltes	0–1	Global
		Kouassi 57'

Rizal Memorial Stadium, Manila
Referee: Krizmark Nañola (QFA)
April 3, 2016
20:15

Ceres	7–0	Forza
Christiaens 15'; Burkey 17'; Marañón 36', 39'; Gallardo 61'; Soriano 63'; Panhay 80'

Rizal Memorial Stadium, Manila
Referee: Aldous Mirafuentes (FAR)

=== Semi finals ===
April 6, 2016
17:15

Stallion	0–2	Global
		Nikolić 29'; Kaole 43'

Rizal Memorial Stadium, Manila
Referee: Linjun Talaver (NOFA)
April 6, 2016
20:15

Ceres	3–3 (a.e.t.)	Kaya
Reichelt 8'; Gallardo 14'; De Murga 36'		Porteria 13', 20'; Clark 72'
Penalties
Adrian Gallardo (penalty scored); Lee (penalty scored); Reichelt (penalty scored); Jalsor Soriano (penalty scored); Schröck (penalty scored); Son (penalty scored); Steuble (penalty missed); Sang Min (penalty scored); Guirado (penalty scored)	8–7	Porteria (penalty scored); Borromeo (penalty scored); Tanton (penalty scored); Lopez Mendy (penalty scored); Clark (penalty scored); Matthews (penalty scored); Janrick Soriano (penalty missed); Omura (penalty scored); Ugarte (penalty missed)

Rizal Memorial Stadium, Manila
Referee: Clifford Daypuyat (ZANDIFA)

=== Plate Semi finals ===
April 7, 2016
17:15

Green Archers United	0–1	JP Voltes
		Hoshide 68'

Rizal Memorial Stadium, Manila
Referee: Krizmark Nañola (QFA)
April 7, 2016
20:15

Forza	0–4	Loyola Meralco Sparks
		J. Younghusband 25', 74', 90'; Cañas 35'

Rizal Memorial Stadium, Manila
Referee: Aldous Mirafuentes (FAR)

=== Plate ===
April 16, 2016
14:15

JP Voltes	0–2	Loyola Meralco Sparks
		Minniecon 61'; Valmayor 77'

Rizal Memorial Stadium, Manila

=== Third place ===
April 16, 2016
17:15

Stallion	1–2	Kaya
Flores 21'		Lopez Mendy 40', 68'

Rizal Memorial Stadium, Manila

=== Final ===
April 16, 2016
20:15

Global	3–1	Ceres
Bahadoran 21', 56'; M. Hartmann 24'		Burkey 69'

Rizal Memorial Stadium, Manila
Referee: Clifford Daypuyat(ZANDIFA)

== Player awards ==
Player	Club	Award
Misagh Bahadoran	Global	Golden Ball
Patrick Deyto	Global	Best Goalkeeper
Amani Aguinaldo	Global	Best Defender
Miguel Tanton	Kaya	Best Midfielder
Robert Lopez Mendy	Kaya	Top scorer
Source: The Manila Times

== Season Statistics ==
=== Tournament team rankings ===
Note: As per statistical convention in football, matches decided in extra time are counted as wins and losses, while matches decided by penalty shoot-outs are counted as draws.

Pos.	Team	G	Pld	W	D	L	Pts	GF	GA	GD
1	Global	B	8	7	0	1	21	21	5	+16
2	Ceres	B	8	6	1	1	19	41	11	+30
3	Kaya	A	8	6	1	1	19	28	8	+20
4	Stallion	A	8	6	0	2	18	24	9	+15
Eliminated in the quarter-finals
5	Loyola Meralco Sparks	B	8	5	0	3	15	30	9	+21
6	JP Voltes	A	8	4	0	4	12	11	10	+1
7	Green Archers United	B	7	3	0	4	9	16	12	+4
8	Forza	A	7	2	0	5	6	6	28	−22
Failed to qualify in Knock Out stage
9	Pasargad	B	5	1	0	4	3	6	26	−20
10	Agila MSA	A	5	0	1	4	1	2	15	−13
11	Laos	A	5	0	1	4	1	3	17	−14
12	Manila Nomads	B	5	0	0	5	0	0	38	−38

=== Top Goalscorers ===
Rank	Name	Team	Goals
1	(Senegal) Robert Lopez Mendy	Kaya	11
2	(Spain) Alvaro Castiella	Loyola	9
3	(Spain) Adrián Gallardo	Ceres	8
3	(Philippines) James Younghusband	Loyola	8
4	(Ghana) Jordan Mintah	Stallion	7
5	(Philippines) Stephan Schröck	Ceres	6
6	(Philippines) Emelio Caligdong	Green Archers United	5
6	(Philippines) Matthew Hartmann	Global	5
6	(Spain) Bienvenido Marañón	Ceres	5
6	(Australia) Tahj Minniecon	Loyola	5
7	(Philippines) Jovin Bedic	Kaya	4
7	(South Korea) Lee Jeong Woo	Ceres	4
7	(Ivory Coast) Kofi Kouassi	Global	4
7	(Philippines) Martin Steuble	Ceres	4
7	(Philippines) Ruben Doctora	Stallion	4
7	(Philippines) Omid Nazari	Global	4
7	(Philippines) Jose Porteria	Kaya	4

=== Hat-tricks ===
Player	For	Against	Result	Date
(Philippines) Omid Nazari	Global	PSG	7–0	6 February 2016
(Spain) Alvaro Castiella	Loyola	PSG	1–7	13 February 2016
(Australia) Tahj Minniecon	Loyola	PSG	1–7	13 February 2016
(Philippines) Martin Steuble	Ceres	Manila Nomads	0–15	14 February 2016
(South Korea) Lee Jeong Woo	Ceres	Manila Nomads	0–15	14 February 2016
(Spain) Adrián Gallardo^{4}	Ceres	PSG	0–9	18 February 2016
(Philippines) Stephan Schröck	Ceres	PSG	0–9	18 February 2016
(Senegal) Robert Lopez Mendy	Kaya	JP Voltes	0–4	27 February 2016
(Ghana) Jordan Mintah^{4}	Stallion	Forza	1–9	28 February 2016
(Senegal) Robert Lopez Mendy	Kaya	Forza	0–6	3 March 2016
(Spain) Alvaro Castiella ^{6}	Loyola	PSG	11–0	5 March 2016
(Philippines) James Younghusband	Loyola	Forza	0–4	7 April 2016
^{4}Player scored four goals^{5}Player scored five goals^{6}Player scored six goals

=== Own Goals ===
Player	For	Club	Own Goal
(Philippines) Gerald Orcullo	Forza	Agila	1
(Philippines) Bervic Italia	Forza	Stallion	1
