= 2017 Philippines Football League =

1st season of the Philippines Football League

Philippines Football League
- Season: 2017
- Dates: May 6 – November 28, 2017 (Regular season); December 2 – 16, 2017 (Finals series)
- Champions: Ceres–Negros; 1st title
- AFC Champions League: Ceres–Negros
- AFC Cup: Global Cebu
- Matches: 118
- Goals: 376 (3.19 per match)
- Top goalscorer: Bienvenido Marañón (22 goals)
- Best goalkeeper: Roland Müller (9 clean sheets)
- Biggest home win: Ceres–Negros 7–0 Ilocos United (July 8)
- Biggest away win: Meralco Manila 0–7 Ceres–Negros (July 15)
- Highest scoring: JPV Marikina 6–3 Davao Aguilas (November 21)
- Longest winning run: Meralco Manila (May 6 – June 17); JPV Marikina (May 31 – June 25); Kaya–Makati (July 5–23) (5 matches)
- Longest unbeaten run: Meralco Manila (May 6 – July 8) (9 matches)
- Longest winless run: Ilocos United (May 7 – Sept 17) (19 matches)
- Longest losing run: Ilocos United (May 13 – June 21); Ilocos United (Sep 30 – Oct 29); Kaya–Makati (Oct 28 – Dec 15) (5 matches)
- Highest attendance: 5,350; Global Cebu 1–0 Ceres–Negros (July 5)
- Lowest attendance: 0 (Behind closed doors); Meralco Manila 0–0 Ceres–Negros (November 24)

The 2017 Philippines Football League was the inaugural season of the Philippines Football League (PFL), the professional football league of the Philippines. The league was officially launched on April 21, 2017, at Shangri-La at the Fort in Taguig, while the first match of the season was played on May 6. The PFL replaced the Metro Manila-based United Football League (UFL), which served as the country's de facto top-level football league from 2009 to 2016. The league was made up of 8 clubs: 6 from the UFL (Ceres, Global, JP Voltes, Kaya, Loyola Meralco Sparks, and Stallion) and 2 expansion teams (Davao Aguilas and Ilocos United). Each club played the others four times (a home-and-away quadruple round-robin format), twice at their home ground and twice at that of their opponents', for 28 games. The teams that finished the season in the top four entered a playoff tournament to determine the league's champion.

The 2017 season was the only PFL season to feature a playoff finals for the league champion. The top four teams of the league's regular season, which concluded on November 28, progressed to the playoff finals, dubbed as the Finals Series. The Finals Series was held between December 2 and 16 and consisted of a two-legged semifinals, a third-place playoff, and the final match. The final took place on December 16 at the Panaad Stadium in Bacolod, between Ceres–Negros and Global Cebu. Ceres–Negros won the match 4–1 and became the first club to win the PFL title.

== Teams ==
On November 24, 2016, it was reported that at least five teams will join the inaugural season of the PFL. Bacolod-based Ceres–Negros F.C. reportedly will move to Davao City, and a new club will be formed to represent Bacolod or the Negros Island Region. However at the time of the report, nothing has been confirmed by the club or the Philippine Football Federation (PFF). Ceres later denied reports of stating that they will field a second team supposedly to be based in Davao City.

Ceres, Global, Loyola, Stallion, as well as Kaya were confirmed by the PFF on November 29, 2016, as official clubs for the inaugural 2017 season and is projecting that three other clubs will join. By December 2016, JP Voltes joined the list of confirmed 2017 PFL clubs.

It was reported that a total of ten clubs expressed interest to join the league, eight of which have submitted documents required by the PFF according to PFF General Secretary Ed Gastanes. Green Archers United and a club owned by seaport management firm International Container Terminal Services, were the two clubs which withdrew their bid to participate in the league. By April 1, 2017, the PFF has confirmed the participation of 8 clubs.

=== Stadiums and locations ===
The PFF confirmed the following clubs with their localities and stadiums that will comprise the inaugural season of the PFL.

Team	Location	Stadium	Capacity
Ceres–Negros	Bacolod	Panaad Stadium	8,000
Davao Aguilas	Tagum, Davao del Norte	Davao del Norte Sports Complex	3,000
Global Cebu	Cebu City	Cebu City Sports Complex (Note: The University of San Carlos Stadium was initially the designated home ground of Global Cebu as per the PFF. However the venue still to be completed. The club had played at the Rizal Memorial Stadium for its home games prior to July 2017. They played their first match at their home locality on July 5, 2017, in their home game against Ceres–Negros at the Cebu City Sports Complex which was being rehabilitated by the Cebu Football Association since May 2017.)	8,000
Ilocos United	Bantay, Ilocos Sur (Note: The home stadium of the club is located in Bantay, Ilocos Sur, a nearby town of Vigan. For administrative and marketing purposes the home city of Ilocos United is designated as "Vigan")	Quirino Stadium	5,000
JPV Marikina	Marikina, Metro Manila	Marikina Sports Complex (Note: Because of the ongoing works in the Marikina Sports Complex, the team played its home league games at either the Biñan Football Stadium in Biñan, or the Rizal Memorial Stadium. In essence, they were groundsharing with Stallion Laguna F.C. and Meralco Manila.)	15,000
Kaya–Makati	Makati, Metro Manila	University of Makati Stadium	4,000
Meralco Manila	Manila	Rizal Memorial Stadium (Note: Meralco Manila's league home match against Ceres Negros on November 24, 2017, was held at the PFF National Training Centre in Carmona, Cavite due to the NCAA collegiate league reserving Rizal Memorial Stadium as the venue for its NCAA Season 93 football competition opening day.)	12,873
Stallion Laguna	Biñan, Laguna	Biñan Football Stadium	2,580

Home venues of PFL clubs
2017 Philippines Football League is located in Philippines	Metro Manila
2017 Philippines Football League is located in Philippines	2017 Philippines Football League is located in Metro Manila

=== Personnel and kits ===
Team	Head coach	Captain	Kit manufacturer	Sponsors
Ceres–Negros	(Serbia) Risto Vidaković	(Philippines) Martin Steuble	(Germany) Puma	Ceres Liner
Davao Aguilas	(Philippines) Marlon Maro	(Philippines) Phil Younghusband	(Philippines) LGR	San Miguel Corporation
Global Cebu	(Singapore) Akbar Nawas	(Philippines) Misagh Bahadoran	(Philippines) LGR	Cebu Tourism Board
Ilocos United	(Australia) Ian Gillan	(England) Adam Mitter	(Germany) Puma	Metro Global, Pool World Philippines, Pyramid
JPV Marikina	(Philippines) Dan Padernal	(Japan) Takashi Odawara	(Philippines) LGR	JK Mart, BranchForth, Santouka Ramen
Kaya–Makati	(Philippines) Noel Marcaida	(Japan) Masanari Omura	(Philippines) LGR	LBC, Yellow Cab Pizza
Meralco Manila	(Philippines) Aris Caslib	(Philippines) Simon Greatwich	(Japan) Mizuno	Meralco
Stallion Laguna	(Philippines) Ernest Nierras	(Philippines) Ruben Doctora	(Philippines) Nixáre	Giligan's Restaurant, Belmont Hotel

=== Managerial changes ===
Team	Outgoing manager	Manner of departure	Date of vacancy	Position in table	Incoming manager	Date of appointment
Global Cebu	(England) John Burridge	Sacked	October 2016	Pre-season	(Japan) Kenichi Yatsuhashi	December 2016
Meralco Manila	(Scotland) Simon Mcmenemy	End of contract	December 2016	Pre-season	(Philippines) Aris Caslib	December 2016
Global Cebu	(Japan) Kenichi Yatsuhashi		December 2016	Pre-season	(Japan) Toshiaki Imai	January 2017
Kaya–Makati	(Philippines) Chris Greatwich	Promoted to Team Manager	January 2017	Pre-season	(Philippines) Noel Marcaida	January 2017
JPV Marikina	(Japan) Yu Hoshide		February 2017	Pre-season	(Philippines) Dan Padernal	April 2017
Global Cebu	(Japan) Toshiaki Imai	Resigned	May 2017	2nd	(Philippines) Marjo Allado (interim)	May 2017
Global Cebu	(Philippines) Marjo Allado	End of interim tenure	June 2017	3rd	(Singapore) Akbar Nawas	June 2017
Davao Aguilas	(Australia) Gary Phillips	Sacked	September 2017	7th	(Philippines) Marlon Maro	September 2017

== Foreign players ==
A maximum of four foreigners are allowed per club which follows the Asian Football Confederation's (AFC) '3+1 rule'; three players of any nationality and a fourth coming from an AFC member nation.

Players name in bold indicates the player was registered during the mid-season transfer window.

Club	Players				Former Players^{1}
Ceres–Negros	(Japan) Kota Kawase	(Spain) Bienvenido Marañón	(Spain) Fernando Rodríguez	(Spain) Súper	(Spain) Antonio Bello
Davao Aguilas	(Serbia) **Miloš Krstić**	(Papua New Guinea) Brad McDonald ^{2}	(Australia) **Harry Sawyer**	(Serbia) Marko Trkulja	(Serbia) Nikola Grubješić (Serbia) Bojan Mališić
Global Cebu ^{3}	(Japan) Yu Hoshide	(Trinidad and Tobago) **Darryl Roberts**	(Spain) **Rufo Sánchez**	(Brazil) Wesley	(Japan) Shu Sasaki (Guinea) Sekou Sylla
Ilocos United	(Ivory Coast) **Arthur Kouassi**	(England) **Adam Mitter**	(Australia) Andrew Pawiak	(Ghana) Baba Sampana	(Cameroon) William Ebanda (Ghana) Valentine Kama
JPV Marikina	(Japan) Takashi Odawara	(Japan) Atsushi Shimono	(Japan) Takumi Uesato	(Japan) Masaki Yanagawa	
Kaya–Makati	(Senegal) Robert Lopez Mendy	(Ghana) Jordan Mintah	(Japan) Masanari Omura	(Ghana) Alfred Osei	
Meralco Manila	(Spain) Joaco Cañas	(South Korea) Lee Jeong-min	(Australia) Tahj Minniecon	(Serbia) Milan Nikolić	
Stallion Laguna	(South Korea) **Kim Myungsu**	(South Korea) **Ko Kyung-Joon**	(Switzerland) **Gabriele Mascazzini**	(Switzerland) **Carlo Polli**	(Cameroon) Christian Nana (Japan) Ryota Ishikawa (Ivory Coast) Roland Sadia (Japan) Yusuke Yamagata

- **^1** Former players only include players who left after the start of the 2017 season.
- **^2** Also a holder of AFC nationality (Australia)
- **^3** Global FC also registered other foreigners for the international competitions.

AFC Champions League : Ahamad Azzawi (Iraq), Serge Kaole (Ivory Coast)
AFC Cup : Kemy Agustien (Curaçao), Darryl Roberts (Trinidad and Tobago)
RHB Singapore Cup : Serge Kaole (Ivory Coast), Darryl Roberts (Trinidad and Tobago)

During the mid-season transfer window, Darryl Roberts was added in the PFL team, replacing Sekou Sylla.

Foreign players by confederation
AFC	Japan (7), South Korea (3), Australia^{4} (3)
CAF	Ghana (3), Ivory Coast (1), Senegal (1)
CONCACAF	Trinidad and Tobago (1)
CONMEBOL	Brazil (1)
OFC	Papua New Guinea^{4} (1)
UEFA	Spain (5), Serbia (3), Switzerland (2), England (1)

- **^4** Brad McDonald has both Australia and Papua New Guinea FIFA nationality.

== Regular season table ==
Pos	Team	Pld	W	D	L	GF	GA	GD	Pts	Qualification or relegation
1	Meralco Manila	28	17	7	4	43	33	+10	58	Qualification for finals series
2	Ceres–Negros (C)	28	17	6	5	76	27	+49	57	Qualification for finals series
3	Kaya FC–Makati	28	14	5	9	52	35	+17	47	Qualification for finals series
4	Global Cebu	28	13	8	7	47	37	+10	47	Qualification for finals series
5	Stallion Laguna	28	9	8	11	39	49	−10	35	
6	JPV Marikina	28	9	6	13	42	48	−6	33	
7	Davao Aguilas	28	4	10	14	35	56	−21	22	
8	Ilocos United	28	1	6	21	24	73	−49	9	

Source: Philippines Football League
Rules for classification: 1) Points; 2) Goal Difference; 3) Goals Scored
(C) Champions

== Positions by round ==
Team ╲ Round	1	2	3	4	5	6	7	8	9	10	11	12	13	14	15	16	17	18	19	20	21	22	23	24	25	26	27	28	Finals Series
Ceres–Negros	3	4	4	3	2	2	3	3	2	2	1	2	1	2	2	2	2	2	1	2	1	1	1	1	2	1	1	2	1
Global Cebu	2	3	2	3	3	4	4	4	4	3	3	4	4	3	3	3	3	3	3	3	4	4	4	4	4	4	4	4	2
Meralco Manila	1	1	1	1	1	1	1	1	1	1	2	1	2	1	1	1	1	1	2	1	2	2	2	2	1	2	2	1	3
Kaya–Makati	3	2	3	2	4	5	5	5	5	5	4	3	3	4	4	4	4	4	4	4	3	3	3	3	3	3	3	3	4
Stallion Laguna	8	8	8	8	7	7	7	7	7	8	7	6	6	6	6	6	6	6	6	6	6	6	6	6	5	5	5	5	5
JPV Marikina	7	5	5	5	5	3	2	2	3	4	5	5	5	5	5	5	5	5	5	5	5	5	5	5	6	6	6	6	6
Davao Aguilas	3	6	7	7	6	6	6	6	6	6	6	7	7	7	7	7	7	7	7	7	7	7	7	7	7	7	7	7	7
Ilocos United	3	7	6	6	8	8	8	8	8	7	8	8	8	8	8	8	8	8	8	8	8	8	8	8	8	8	8	8	8

Finals Series

Source: Philippines Football League

== Results by round ==
Team \ Round	1	2	3	4	5	6	7	8	9	10	11	12	13	14	15	16	17	18	19	20	21	22	23	24	25	26	27	28	SF1	SF2	BF3	Final
Ceres–Negros	D	W	L	W	W	W	L	W	W	W	W	L	W	D	W	W	W	D	W	L	W	W	W	D	D	W	D	L	W	W	—	W
Davao Aguilas	D	L	L	L	D	D	D	L	L	D	L	L	D	L	L	D	L	D	W	W	L	D	L	L	W	L	W	D	—	—	—	—
Global Cebu	W	D	W	L	W	L	W	D	W	W	D	D	W	W	L	D	L	D	W	D	L	W	L	W	W	D	L	W	W	D	—	L
Ilocos United	D	L	L	L	L	L	D	L	L	D	L	L	L	L	D	L	L	L	L	W	L	L	L	L	L	D	D	L	—	—	—	—
JPV Marikina	L	W	L	W	W	W	W	W	L	L	L	L	D	W	D	D	L	W	L	L	L	D	L	L	D	W	L	D	—	—	—	—
Kaya–Makati	D	W	L	W	W	L	L	D	W	W	W	W	W	D	L	L	D	D	W	L	W	W	W	L	W	W	L	L	L	L	L	—
Meralco Manila	W	W	W	W	W	D	D	W	W	L	D	W	L	W	W	W	W	D	D	W	L	D	W	W	W	L	W	D	L	D	W	—
Stallion Laguna	L	D	L	L	D	D	L	L	L	L	D	W	W	W	D	L	W	W	W	W	L	D	D	L	W	D	L	W	—	—	—	—

Source: Philippines Football League

== Results ==
The eight clubs will play each other four times for twenty eight matches each during the regular season.

=== First round ===
Home \ Away	CER	DAV	GLO	ILO	JPV	KAY	MER	STA
Ceres–Negros	—	2–0	1–0	7–0	2–2	3–1	1–2	5–1
Davao Aguilas	1–3	—	1–2	0–0	2–3	1–5	2–2	2–2
Global Cebu	1–0	0–0	—	2–1	1–2	3–1	0–0	3–0
Ilocos United	1–1	1–1	0–3	—	1–2	2–4	0–1	1–1^{1}
JPV Marikina	2–1	0–3^{2}	1–2	2–0	—	0–3^{3}	0–1	0–2
Kaya–Makati	1–1	2–0	2–2	5–2	2–0	—	0–2	1–0
Meralco Manila	0–7	2–0	2–2	2–1	2–1	2–1	—	1–1
Stallion Laguna	0–1	0–0	1–1	1–0	0–4	1–3	1–5	—

Source: Philippines Football League
Legend: Blue = home team win; Yellow = draw; Red = away team win.

=== Second round ===
Home \ Away	CER	DAV	GLO	ILO	JPV	KAY	MER	STA
Ceres–Negros	—	5–1	1–0	5–0	5–0	3–2	6–0	5–2
Davao Aguilas	1–1	—	2–2	2–0	1–1	0–2	2–3	0–2
Global Cebu	2–0	3–1	—	3–2	2–1	0–0	1–2	4–3
Ilocos United	1–5	2–4	3–3	—	2–2	0–1	0–3^{4}	1–4
JPV Marikina	2–2^{5}	6–3	5–2	1–2	—	1–0	1–1	1–2
Kaya–Makati	2–3	1–3	2–0	2–1	2–2	—	2–1	4–0
Meralco Manila	0–0	2–0	1–2	1–0	1–0	1–0	—	0–0
Stallion Laguna	2–0	2–2	2–1	5–0	1–0	1–1	2–3	—

Source: Philippines Football League
Legend: Blue = home team win; Yellow = draw; Red = away team win.

^1 Match abandoned at halftime due to deteriorating pitch condition by way of adverse weather. As per PFL rules, final score for matches abandoned at halftime and the second half would be the score of the game just prior to abandonment. ^2 Match deemed a forfeiture due to home stadium unavailability. Kaya awarded a 0–3 win
^3 Match deemed a forfeiture due to ambulances supposed to be on the venue got involved in an accident. Davao awarded a 0–3 win. Forfeiture affirmed on Nov. 22
^4 Match deemed a forfeiture due to Ilocos' non-compliance with the league's franchise agreement. Meralco awarded a 0-3 win.
^5 Match abandoned in the 78rd minute due to "poor visibility". Game ended in 2–2 draw.

== Finals Series ==
The top four teams from the Regular Season qualified and are seeded for the Finals Series' Semifinals. The 1st and 4th ranked clubs of the Regular Season are seeded in the first semifinals while the 2nd and 3rd ranked club were seeded in the second semifinals. The winners of the two-legged semifinals contested for the league title in the final while the losers played in a third place playoff.

=== Bracket ===
Semi-finals
1	Meralco Manila	1	1	2
4	Global Cebu	2	1	3
2	Ceres Negros	1	2	3
3	Kaya–Makati	0	1	1

Final
4	Global Cebu	1
2	Ceres Negros	4
Third place
1	Meralco Manila	3
3	Kaya–Makati	1

=== Semi-finals ===
All times are in Philippine Standard Time (UTC+8)

==== Meralco Manila vs Global Cebu (1st vs 4th) ====
December 2
19:00

Global Cebu	2–1	Meralco Manila
Wesley 90'; Minegishi 90+2'		Minniecon 61' (pen.)

Rizal Memorial Stadium, Manila (Note: The game is considered as a Home Game for Global Cebu. Game was played in RMS due to unavailability of Global's home stadium, the Cebu City Sports Complex.), Manila
Referee: Linjun Talaver (Philippines)
December 9
19:00

Meralco Manila	1–1	Global Cebu
Dizon 2'		Sanchez 83'

Rizal Memorial Stadium, Manila
Referee: Ariel Montana (Philippines)

Global Cebu won 3–2 on aggregate.

==== Ceres–Negros vs Kaya–Makati (2nd vs 3rd) ====
December 3
16:00

Kaya–Makati	0–1	Ceres–Negros
	Report	Schröck 90+2'

University of Makati Stadium, Makati
Referee: Clifford Daypuyat (Philippines)
December 9
19:00

Ceres–Negros	2–1	Kaya–Makati
Marañón 30'; Ramsay 73'		Ugarte 43'

Panaad Stadium, Bacolod
Referee: Mick John Pineda (Philippines)

Ceres–Negros won 3–1 on aggregate.

=== Third place ===
December 15
21:00 UTC+8

Meralco Manila	3–1	Kaya FC–Makati
Cañas 3'; Dizon 15', 23'		Bedic 58'

Rizal Memorial Stadium, Manila

=== Final ===
December 16
18:00 UTC+8

Ceres–Negros	4–1	Global Cebu
Marañón 4'; Ramsay 19', 27', 60'		Roberts 88'

Panaad Stadium, Bacolod
Attendance: 2,553
Referee: Suhaizi Shukri (Malaysia)

== Season team rankings ==
As per statistical convention in football, matches decided in extra time are counted as wins and losses, while matches decided by penalty shoot-outs are counted as draws.

Pos	Team	Pld	W	D	L	GF	GA	GD	Pts	Qualification
1	Ceres–Negros (C)	31	20	6	5	83	29	+54	66	Qualification for the AFC Champions League Preliminary Round 1 or AFC Cup Group Stage
2	Global Cebu	31	14	9	8	51	43	+8	51	Qualification for the AFC Cup Group Stage
3	Meralco Manila	31	18	8	5	48	37	+11	62	Possible qualification for the AFC Cup Group Stage (Note: If the PFL Champion qualifies for AFC Champions League Group Stage)
4	Kaya–Makati	31	14	5	12	54	41	+13	47	
5	Stallion Laguna	28	9	8	11	39	49	−10	35	Did not qualify for the Finals Series
6	JPV Marikina	28	9	6	13	42	48	−6	33	Did not qualify for the Finals Series
7	Davao Aguilas	28	4	10	14	35	56	−21	22	Did not qualify for the Finals Series
8	Ilocos United	28	1	6	21	24	73	−49	9	Did not qualify for the Finals Series

Source: Philippines Football League
(C) Champions

== Season statistics ==
=== Scoring ===
==== Top goalscorers ====
Rank	Player	Team	Goals
1	(Spain) Bienvenido Marañón	Ceres–Negros	22
2	(Spain) Fernando Rodríguez	Ceres–Negros	21
3	(Ghana) Jordan Mintah	Kaya–Makati	18
4	(Japan) Takumi Uesato	JPV Marikina	16
5	(Philippines) Jesus Melliza	Stallion Laguna	13
6	(Japan) Takashi Odawara	JPV Marikina	10
6	(Philippines) Iain Ramsay	Ceres–Negros	10
6	(Australia) Harry Sawyer	Davao Aguilas	10
6	(Philippines) Phil Younghusband	Davao Aguilas; Meralco Manila	10
10	(Senegal) Robert Lopez Mendy	Kaya–Makati	9
10	(Spain) Rufo Sanchez	Global Cebu	9
10	(Philippines) James Younghusband	Davao Aguilas; Meralco Manila	9

==== Top assists ====
Rank	Player	Team	Goals
1	(Philippines) Iain Ramsay	Ceres–Negros	12
2	(Philippines) Stephan Schröck	Ceres–Negros	11
3	(Spain) Bienvenido Marañón	Ceres–Negros	10
3	(Ghana) Jordan Mintah	Kaya–Makati	10
3	(Philippines) Miguel Tanton	Kaya–Makati	10
6	(Australia) Tahj Minniecon	Meralco Manila	9
6	(Philippines) OJ Porteria	Ceres–Negros	9
8	(Philippines) Hikaru Minegishi	Global Cebu	8
8	(Philippines) Phil Younghusband	Davao Aguilas; Meralco Manila	8
10	(Philippines) Kouichi Belgira	JPV Marikina	7
10	(Philippines) Matthew Hartmann	Davao Aguilas; Global Cebu	7
10	(Senegal) Robert Lopez Mendy	Kaya–Makati	7

=== Hat-tricks ===
As of December 17, 2017

Player	Club	Result	Against	Date
(Japan) Takumi Uesato	JPV Marikina	4–0 (A)	Stallion Laguna	May 31, 2017
(Spain) Bienvenido Marañón	Ceres–Negros	3–1 (H)	Kaya–Makati	June 24, 2017
(Spain) Fernando Rodríguez	Ceres–Negros	5–1 (H)	Stallion Laguna	June 28, 2017
(Philippines) Iain Ramsay	Ceres–Negros	7–0 (A)	Meralco Manila	July 15, 2017
(Ghana) Jordan Mintah	Kaya–Makati	5–2 (H)	Ilocos United	July 19, 2017
(Japan) Takumi Uesato^{4}	JPV Marikina	5–2 (H)	Global Cebu	August 13, 2017
(Philippines) Jesus Melliza^{4}	Stallion Laguna	5–0 (H)	Ilocos United	September 10, 2017
(Australia) Harry Sawyer	Davao Aguilas	4–2 (A)	Ilocos United	October 18, 2017
(Spain) Rufo Sánchez	Global Cebu	4–3 (H)	Stallion Laguna	November 2, 2017
(Spain) Fernando Rodríguez	Ceres–Negros	5–1 (H)	Davao Aguilas	November 2, 2017
(Spain) Fernando Rodríguez	Ceres–Negros	6–0 (H)	Meralco Manila	November 5, 2017
(Japan) Takumi Uesato	JPV Marikina	6–3 (H)	Davao Aguilas	November 21, 2017
(Philippines) Iain Ramsay	Ceres–Negros	4–1 (H)	Global Cebu	December 16, 2017

Note

(H) – Home; (A) – Away

^{4} Player scored four goals

=== Clean sheets ===
As of December 14, 2017

Rank	Goalkeeper	Team	Clean sheets
1	(Philippines) Roland Müller	Ceres–Negros	9
2	(Philippines) Florencio Badelic Jr.	Meralco Manila	7
2	(Philippines) Benito Rosalia	Stallion Laguna	7
4	(Philippines) Ref Cuaresma	Kaya–Makati	6
4	(Philippines) Patrick Deyto	Global Cebu	6
6	(Serbia) Marko Trkulja	Davao Aguilas	4
6	(Philippines) Nathanael Villanueva	Meralco Manila	4
8	(Philippines) Nelson Gasic	JPV Marikina	3
9	(Philippines) Zach Banzon	Kaya–Makati	2
9	(Philippines) Louie Casas	Ceres-Negros	2

=== Discipline ===
==== Red cards ====
As of December 12, 2017

Rank	Player	Team	Red cards
1	(Philippines) Jason Cordova	Davao Aguilas	2
1	(Philippines) Miguel Tanton	Kaya–Makati	2
3	(Philippines) Adam Reed	Kaya–Makati	1
3	(Philippines) Jalsor Soriano	Kaya–Makati	1
3	(Philippines) Nicholas Ferrer	Stallion Laguna	1
3	(Ghana) Jordan Mintah	Kaya–Makati	1
3	(Guinea) Sekou Sylla	Global Cebu	1
3	(Philippines) Roland Müller	Ceres–Negros	1
3	(Philippines) Daniel Gadia	Meralco Manila	1
3	(Japan) Takumi Uesato	JPV Marikina	1
3	(Philippines) Ali Mahmoud	JPV Marikina	1
3	(Philippines) Paul Mulders	Global Cebu	1
3	(Philippines) Peter Fadrigalan	JPV Marikina	1
3	(Serbia) Milan Nikolić	Meralco Manila	1
3	(Philippines) Robert Cañedo	JPV Marikina	1
3	(Philippines) John Celiz	JPV Marikina	1
3	(Philippines) OJ Porteria	Ceres–Negros	1
3	(Philippines) John Kanayama	Ilocos United	1
3	(Philippines) David Fornea	Meralco Manila	1

Additionally, players may be suspended for more than a single match due to violations of the PFF Disciplinary Code. The Disciplinary Committee on November 7, 2017, imposed match suspensions and fines to players due to misconduct towards officials and/or other players.
