= Berkery =

Berkery is a surname. Notable people with the surname include:

- Shane Berkery (born 1992), Irish-Japanese artist
- Tom Berkery (born 1953), Irish politician

== See also ==
- Berker
- Berkey
