= Burkey =

Burkey is a given name and surname. Notable people with the name include:

- Burkey Belser (1947–2023), American graphic designer
- Jason Burkey (born 1985), American actor
- Nate Burkey (born 1985), Filipino footballer

== See also ==
- Berkey
- Burke
