= Jun Badelic =

Filipino footballer

Personal information
- Full name: Florencio Gamba Badelic Jr.
- Date of birth: 22 May 1994 (age 32)
- Place of birth: Manolo Fortich, Bukidnon, Philippines
- Height: 1.81 m (5 ft 11 in)
- Position: Goalkeeper

Team information
- Current team: Houston Dynamo

Youth career
- Holy Cross High School

College career
Years	Team	Apps	(Gls)
–2014	Emilio Aguinaldo College		

Senior career*
Years	Team	Apps	(Gls)
2014–2017	Global	3	(0)
2017–2018	Meralco Manila	15	(0)
2018–2019	Global Cebu	9	(0)
2019–2023	Ceres–Negros	8	(0)
2023–2025	Dynamic Herb Cebu	32	(0)
2025–2026	Melaka	5	(0)
2026–	Houston Dynamo	0	(0)

International career^{‡}
2014	Philippines U21		
2015	Philippines U23	5	(0)
- * Club domestic league appearances and goals as of 05:08, 14 August 2025 (UTC) ‡ National team caps and goals as of 10:22, 28 August 2023 (UTC)

Florencio Gamba "Jun" Badelic Jr. (born 22 May 1994) is a Filipino professional footballer who plays as a goalkeeper for Major League Soccer club Houston Dynamo.

== Personal life ==
Badelic was born in Manolo Fortich, Bukidnon. His brother, Nixon, also played alongside him in college.

== Club career ==
=== Global ===
Badelic played high school football for Holy Cross High School in Bukidnon, and played college football for the EAC Generals in the NCAA. In 2014, he joined Global of the United Football League. In 2015, the club qualified for the group stage of the AFC Cup for the very first time, and Badelic made his debut in the club's second match, keeping a clean sheet in a 0–0 draw against Malaysian side Sri Pahang. Badelic would stay with Global for the 2016 UFL season, though he was second in the pecking order behind Patrick Deyto.

After his stint at Meralco Manila, Badelic rejoined Global in 2018 amidst a myriad of departures caused by administrative issues at the club. He became the club's first-team keeper after Deyto's departure during the 2018 Copa Paulino Alcantara.

=== Meralco Manila ===
In April 2017, he transferred from Global to Loyola, who had recently joined the professional Philippines Football League and renamed to Meralco Manila, where he competed for a goalkeeping spot with Ace Villanueva. During the 2017 season, he consolidated his spot as a starter for the club and led the club to a first-place finish in the regular season, with Meralco Manila finishing 3rd overall. However, at the season's end, the club announced their withdrawal from the PFL.

=== Ceres–Negros ===
After his second stint for Global, he transferred to PFL champions Ceres–Negros in January 2019, ahead of the club's campaign in the AFC Cup. At Ceres, though he was not a regular starter, he won one PFL and one Copa Paulino Alcantara. The next year, Ceres underwent a change of management due to financial strain brought on by the COVID-19 pandemic.

After renaming to United City, Badelic was among the players re-signed and won another PFL and Copa Paulino Alcantara in 2020 and 2022, respectively. However, much like Ceres before it, United City went through financial issues and withdrew from the 2022–23 edition of the PFL.

=== Dynamic Herb Cebu ===
Following the folding of United City, Badelic signed as a goalkeeper for Dynamic Herb Cebu, who were competing for the PFL title with rivals Kaya–Iloilo. Although Cebu finished second, they qualified for the 2023–24 edition of the AFC Cup, the first in the club's history.

== International career ==
=== Philippines U21 ===
Badelic first played for the Philippine National team as a player for the U21 side in the 2014 Hassanal Bolkiah Trophy.

=== Philippines U23 ===
While playing for Global, Badelic was called up to the Philippines U23 team in 2015 to participate in the 2016 AFC U-23 Championship Qualifiers, making his debut in a 4–0 loss to North Korea. He was called up again to the U23 squad for the 2015 SEA Games, though the Philippines finished bottom.

=== Philippines ===
Badelic was first called up to the Philippine senior team in a September training camp that culminated in a friendly 2–0 win over the Maldives and a qualifier against Uzbekistan. Although he has never made an official appearance for the team, he played in an unofficial friendly against A-League side Perth Glory in July 2016.

== Honours ==
Ceres–Negros

- Philippines Football League: 2019, 2020
- Copa Paulino Alcantara: 2019, 2022

Global

- United Football League: 2014, 2016
- UFL Cup: 2016

Individual

- Philippines Football League Golden Glove: 2024-25
