= Lee Jeong-min =

South Korean footballer (born 1990)

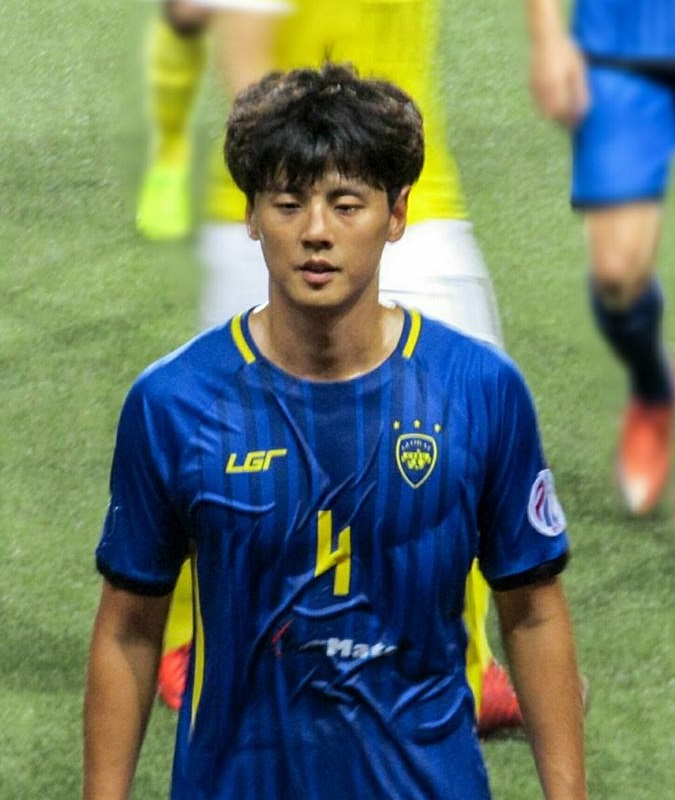
- Lee in a Philippines Football League Match

Personal information
- Date of birth: 17 July 1990 (age 36)
- Place of birth: Seoul, South Korea
- Height: 1.83 m (6 ft 0 in)
- Positions: Centre-back; defensive midfielder

Team information
- Current team: Global Cebu
- Number: 4

Youth career
- 2006–2009: Seongnam Ilhwa

College career
Years	Team	Apps	(Gls)
2009–2013	Chung Ang University		

Senior career*
Years	Team	Apps	(Gls)
- Seongnam Ilhwa
- Hwasung
2017	Meralco Manila		
2018–	Global Cebu		

International career
2005	South Korea U15		
- * Club domestic league appearances and goals

- Lee Jeong-min
- Hangul: 이정민
- RR: I Jeongmin
- MR: I Chŏngmin

Lee Jeong-min (Korean: 이정민; born 17 July 1990) is a South Korean professional footballer who currently plays in the Philippines Football League (premier division) club Global Cebu F.C. primarily as a central defender, but he can also play defensive midfielder.

== Early life ==
Lee started playing competitive football at the age of eleven, when he entered Jung Hwa Elementary School. Showing great athleticism at a very young age, he was scouted and was asked to move to Jang An Middle School where he continued training. His efforts did not go unnoticed as he was selected to be a part of the Under-15 National Youth Team of South Korea. As a testament to his remarkable performance as a young footballer, he once again had to move to Pung Sang High School to join a group of young men who would form the K1 League Seongnam Ilhwa FC's Youth Team. He went on to play for the said team and would eventually be one of only three players from his batch to secure a contract with Seongnam FC.

== Club career ==
=== Seongnam FC ===
Lee secured a three-year contract with Seongnam FC when he was still in high school. Despite having already been selected to be a part of the K1 League Team's roster, Lee went on to pursue schooling at the Chung Ang University in Seoul. He continued playing football for the University Varsity Team and joining various tournaments in the age category. He remained exceptional at playing, eventually winning Most Valuable Player awards in tournaments such as the National Chungae Tournament of University.

After finishing university, he went on to pursue his contractual obligation with Seongnam FC. He attended training sessions and games with Seongnam FC, but his stay would be short-lived as he needed to get into mandatory military training.

=== Hwasung FC ===
As a norm in South Korea, it is compulsory to undergo a mandatory two-year military training for all young and able men. Lee was no exception, as he needed to go through the rigors of military training. He didn’t pass up the opportunity to get into the military football team to continue training. He played for the entire duration of his stay in the military in what was considered the Third Division of the Korean Football League.

=== FC Meralco Manila ===
The Philippines saw the introduction of the first ever professional football league in the country through the Philippines Football League. In its maiden season in 2017, the PFL saw eight clubs competing for the first ever championship. One of these clubs was FC Meralco Manila, formerly Loyola Meralco Sparks FC, which represented the Philippines’ capital city of Manila.

Lee was recruited to FC Meralco Manila as one of only four non-Filipino players in a roster of 26 athletes. As regulation provided for only four foreigners in a team, the selection process was rigorous, but Lee was easily chosen because he stood out in the pool of trainees. Upon selection to the team, he joined the team bannered by esteemed Filipino Coach Ariston Caslib and consisting of celebrated national team players from the Philippines.

FC Meralco Manila went on the league series as the number one team after the eliminations round. Lee was instrumental to the success of the team, only missing 3 games at the start of the season due to recovery from ankle impingement during a pre-season practice game, and 1 match for a game suspension resulting from accumulated yellow cards. Lee was awarded Man of the Match in a couple of games because of his outstanding performances.

Despite entering the Finals Series as the top seed Club, FC Meralco Manila lost to Global Cebu FC in the Semi-Finals, and eventually settled for the second runners up position.

=== Global Cebu FC ===
As the new season of the Philippines Football League was just about to commence, news broke out about the cessation of FC Meralco Manila’s operations. Lee was meant to sign a new contract with the said Club, only to find himself without one at the start of 2018. Having made a mark in his former Club, he was easily picked up by Global Cebu FC, Season 2017 League second placer. Being the silver medalists in the previous season, Global Cebu FC was given an opportunity to represent the Philippines in the Group Stages of the AFC Cup 2018. Lee is currently fulfilling his contractual obligations with Global Cebu FC. He played in all the games of the AFC Group Stages and is currently playing for the said team in the Philippines Football League.

==== AFC Cup ====
Lee was among the players that joined Global Cebu FC in the group stages of the AFC Cup 2018. The Club was drawn to join Group G and had to play against Yangon United (Myanmar), Thanh Hoa (Vietnam) and Bali United (Indonesia). He played in all of the home and away matches and helped his team reach the second spot in the rankings.
