= Masanari Omura =

Japanese footballer

Personal information
- Full name: Masanari Omura
- Date of birth: 14 July 1984 (age 42)
- Place of birth: Komaki, Aichi, Japan
- Position: Defender

College career
Years	Team	Apps	(Gls)
- Chukyo University

Senior career*
Years	Team	Apps	(Gls)
2011	Fraser Park		
2011–2022	Kaya	73 (Note: League appearances in the Philippines Football League (PFL) only, from 2017 to 2020. This does not include his league appearances in the United Football League (UFL).)	(4 (Note: League goals in the Philippines Football League (PFL) only, from 2017 to 2020. This does not include his league goals in the United Football League (UFL).))
- * Club domestic league appearances and goals

Masanari Omura (大村 真也, Ōmura Masanari; born 14 July 1984), nicknamed Masa, is a Japanese former professional footballer who played as a defender. He spent the majority of his career with Filipino club Kaya. He was awarded the United Football League Cup Golden Ball in 2015 and had also captained his club.

== Early life ==
Masanari Omura was born on 14 July 1984 in Komaki, Aichi Prefecture, Japan. He started playing football at the age of 10, although he originally liked baseball better but chose football as it was more popular in his school. He went on to captain the football team of Chukyo University. After graduating, he spent three years working for a warehouse company and was also a part-time football coach for elementary school students.

== Career ==
=== Fraser Park ===
Deciding to pursue his dream of becoming a professional footballer but unable to find opportunities in Japan, Omura headed to Australia. He joined NSW Super League club Fraser Park FC and played in almost every match of the 2011 season. However, difficulties renewing his working holiday visa made it unlikely for him to return for another season. Opting to continue his career in another country, his Fraser Park teammate, former Philippines national team player Leigh Gunn, suggested he tryout in the Philippines.

=== Kaya ===
Omura joined Filipino United Football League (UFL) club Kaya in September 2011 and made his debut in that year's UFL Cup. He scored a goal in their 3–0 round of 16 win over Team Socceroo on 20 November. In the 2015 UFL Cup, wherein Kaya won the title, Omura received the Golden Ball award as the best player of the tournament. In the 2016 UFL Cup quarter-finals, he scored the equaliser in their 2–1 win over Loyola Meralco Sparks. However, Kaya finished third place in what turned out to be the last UFL Cup. That same year, he participated in Kaya's first-ever campaign in the AFC Cup, wherein they reached the round of 16.

In 2017, the Philippines Football League (PFL) supplanted the UFL. During the PFL's inaugural season, Omura shared Kaya's captaincy with Aly Borromeo. In 2018, Kaya won the inaugural Copa Paulino Alcantara, the new domestic cup competition of the Philippines. The cup win qualified them for the 2019 AFC Cup. In the 2019 Copa Paulino Alcantara, he scored the second goal in their 3–0 semi-final win over Mendiola. However, they failed to defend their title, falling to Ceres–Negros in the final. Nonetheless, they still qualified for the 2020 AFC Cup.

In 2021, he played in Kaya's first-ever AFC Champions League campaign. In their last group match, a 1–0 loss to Vietnamese champions Viettel, Omura was sent off for a foul on Nguyễn Trọng Hoàng. Later, in the 2021 Copa Paulino Alcantara, Kaya regained their title.

On 31 January 2022, Omura announced his retirement from professional football, having spent 10 years with Kaya. The club's president and general manager, Paul Tolentino, referred to him as a "true club legend".

== Style of play ==
Omura mostly played as a centre-back or defensive midfielder. In Australia, most of the centre-backs were taller than him, so he opted for the latter position. In Kaya, in addition to his defensive roles, he has also played as a winger or forward.

== Honours ==
Kaya

- United Football League Cup: 2015; third place: 2016
- Copa Paulino Alcantara: 2018, 2021; runner-up: 2019

Individual

- United Football League Cup Golden Ball: 2015

== Career statistics ==
=== Club ===
Club	Season	League			Cup		Continental		Total	
Club	Season	Division	Apps	Goals	Apps	Goals	Apps	Goals	Apps	Goals
Kaya–Iloilo	2017	PFL	28	0	–		–		28	0
Kaya–Iloilo	2018	PFL	23	2	6	0	–		29	2
Kaya–Iloilo	2019	PFL	20	2	4	1	6	0	30	3
Kaya–Iloilo	2020	PFL	2	0	–		3	0	5	0
Kaya–Iloilo	2021	PFL	–		4	0	6	0	10	0
Career total			73	4	14	1	15	0	102	5
