= Roland Müller =

Footballer (born 1988)

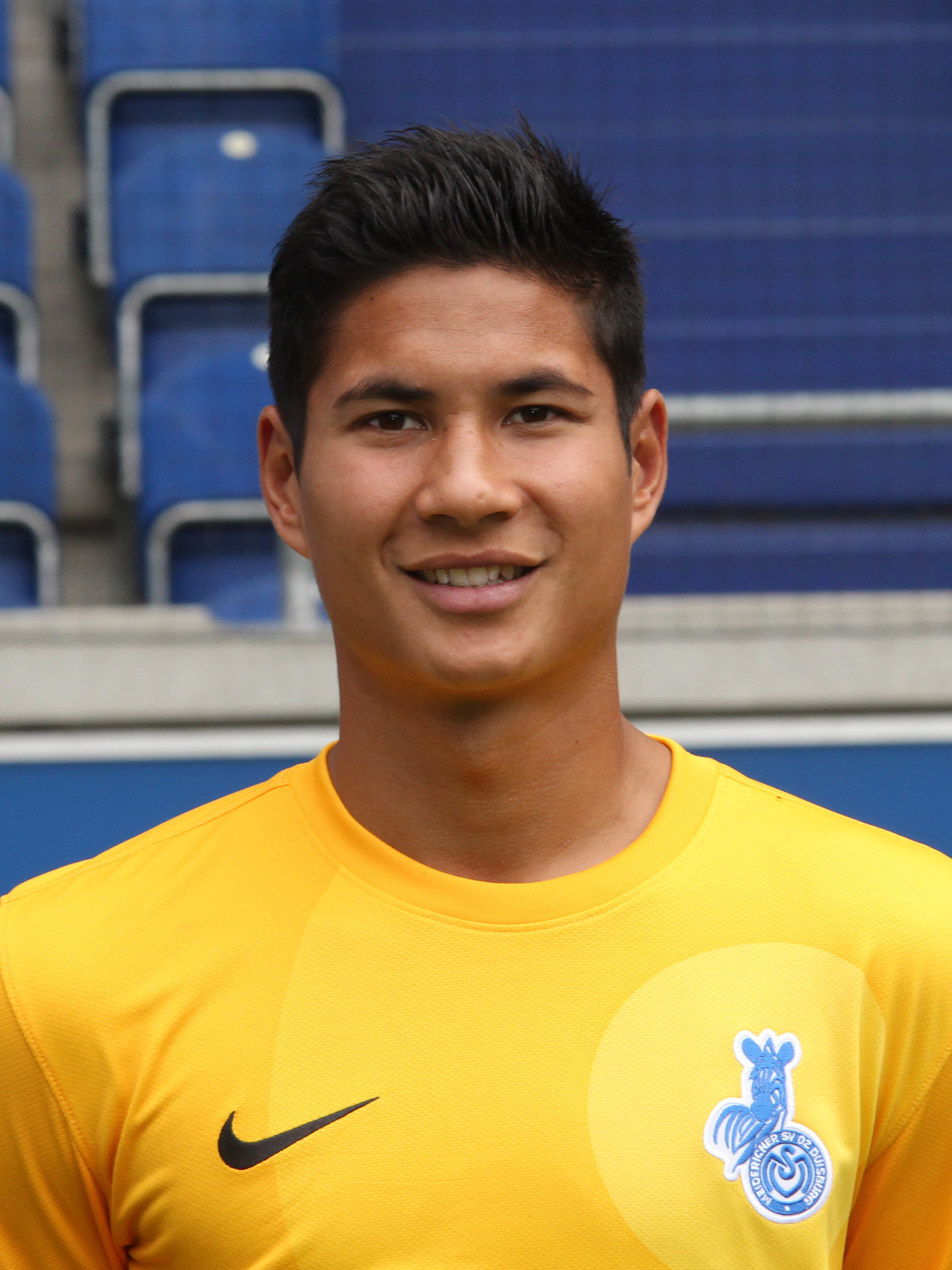
- Müller with Duisburg in 2012.

Personal information
- Full name: Roland Richard Guaves Müller
- Date of birth: 2 March 1988 (age 38)
- Place of birth: Cologne, West Germany
- Height: 1.80 m (5 ft 11 in)
- Position: Goalkeeper

Team information
- Current team: FC St-Prex
- Number: 1

Youth career
- 1998–2007: 1. FC Köln

Senior career*
Years	Team	Apps	(Gls)
2007–2010	1. FC Köln II	64	(0)
2010–2013	MSV Duisburg II	34	(0)
2010–2013	MSV Duisburg	8	(0)
2013–2016	Servette FC	56	(0)
2016	→Étoile Carouge (loan)	8	(0)
2017–2020	Ceres–Negros	50	(0)
2021–	FC St-Prex	77	(0)

International career^{‡}
2011	Philippines U-23	5	(0)
2011–2017	Philippines	22	(0)

Managerial career
- 2023: Philippines (goalkeeping coach)
- * Club domestic league appearances and goals as of 18:13, 29 May 2024 (UTC) ‡ National team caps and goals as of 16:13, 25 November 2016 (UTC)

Roland Richard Guaves Müller (German pronunciation: [ˈmʏlɐ]; born 2 March 1988) is a professional footballer who plays as a goalkeeper for FC Amical Saint-Prex in the 2. Liga Interregional. Born in Germany, Müller played for the Philippines national team, earning 22 caps from 2011 until his international retirement in 2017.

== Club career ==
=== Early career in Germany ===
Müller started at his hometown club, Köln, where he went through the ranks and eventually played their reserve team in the lower leagues. He made a total of 64 appearances for them in three seasons, and never made any first team appearances. His contract expired in the summer of 2010 and he then signed for 2. Bundesliga side Duisburg. He made his first league appearance on 25 November 2012 vs St. Pauli due to an injury to regular first choice shot-stopper Felix Wiedwald. He was not able to answer his international duties with the Philippines for the 2012 AFF Suzuki Cup.

=== Switzerland stint ===
On 16 July 2013, he joined Swiss club Servette, signing a one-year deal with an option for two more years.

Sometime in 2016, Müller was loaned to Étoile Carouge of the Swiss league, 1. Liga Promotion. On 11 June 2016 Ceres F.C. of the United Football League announced that Muller will be joining the club. He is set to be included in the squad during the transfer window from 18 to 31 July at the end of the first round of the double-round robin league. His contract with Étoile Carouge was scheduled to be terminated by the end of June.

=== Return to the Philippines ===
Ceres F.C. which then plays in the United Football League signed Müller mid-season of the 2016 edition of the league after the goalkeeper had stint with Etoile Carouge on loan.

He remained with Ceres when they joined the Philippines Football League, as Ceres-Negros F.C. in 2017. However he announced he took a leave from Ceres-Negros on 21 December 2017, after helping the club win the league title and revealed that he has earlier informed his club as early as June that he would be leaving the club after the inaugural season ended. He stated through social media that he made the decision to give more attention to his pregnant wife. He returned to club duty in July 2018.

== International career ==
Towards the end of August 2011, Müller went to the Philippines and joined the national team's training ahead of the 2011 Long Teng Cup. He was eventually named in the final 20-man squad for the tournament and the provisional Philippines under-23 squad for the 2011 Southeast Asian Games. He made his debut for the Philippine U23 national team at the Southeast Asia-wide regional games and later for the senior squad at the 2011 Long Teng Cup.

In 2013, he was included in the Philippines squad for the 2014 AFC Challenge Cup qualification campaign. In both matches he was chosen to start ahead of Neil Etheridge and did not concede a single goal, helping the Philippines to qualify for the 2014 AFC Challenge Cup.

On 22 March 2017 he announced his retirement from the Philippine national team to spend more time with his family. He made 22 international caps for the Philippines often serving as an alternate goalkeeper to Neil Etheridge. He was originally listed in the 23-man Philippine squad which was set to play a friendly against Malaysia the following the day, which was the national team's first full international match in 2017.

== Coaching career ==
=== Philippines ===
In March 2023, it was reported that Müller was appointed as the new goalkeeper coach of Philippines national team.
