= Kouichi Belgira =

Filipino footballer (born 1996)

Personal information
- Full name: Kouichi Sakino Belgira
- Date of birth: December 28, 1996 (age 29)
- Place of birth: Okayama, Japan
- Positions: Full-back; midfielder

Team information
- Current team: Stallion Laguna
- Number: 22

Senior career*
Years	Team	Apps	(Gls)
2015–2016	Forza		
2016–2017	Meralco Manila	17	(4)
2017–2018	JPV Marikina	21	(2)
2018–2019	Čelik Nikšić	1	(0)
2019	Global Makati	4	(1)
2019–2024	Stallion Laguna	30	(2)
2024	Shan United	1	(0)
2024–	Stallion Laguna	19	(0)

International career^{‡}
2017	Philippines U23	4	(1)
- * Club domestic league appearances and goals as of 13:05, January 8, 2026 (UTC) ‡ National team caps and goals as of 13:05, January 8, 2026 (UTC)

Kouichi Sakino Belgira (born 28 December 1996) is a Filipino professional footballer who plays as a full-back or midfielder for Philippines Football League club Stallion Laguna. Born in Japan, he represents the Philippines at the international level.

== Club career ==
=== Early PFL career ===
Belgira was born in the city of Okayama in Okayama Prefecture, Japan. He started playing professionally in the Philippines at 18 years old, suiting up for UFL Division 2 side Forza. A year later, he went on trial wth UFL side Loyola, becoming part of the first team squad.

Belgira left Loyola in 2017 and signed with JPV Marikina, making 21 appearances in his first season. In 2019, he returned to the Philippines with Global FC, before transferring mid season.

=== Playing abroad ===
After one season with JPV, Belgira signed with Montenegrin Second League team FK Čelik Nikšić in 2018, making only one appearance against FK Ibar.

In 2024, Belgira played abroad again, this time for Shan United in the Myanmar National League, but moved back to the Philippines a few months later.

=== Stallion Laguna ===
After leaving Global, Belgira signed with Stallion Laguna, becoming a starter in the club's second half of the season and in the 2019 Copa Paulino Alcantara. He stayed with Stallion until 2024, also competing in the AFC Cup.

Belgira would rejoin Stallion once more after leaving Shan United, playing 18 games in the 2024–25 season.

== International career ==
=== Philippines U23 ===
Belgira was born to a Filipino father and a Japanese mother, making him eligible to represent both countries internationally. In 2017, he was called up to the squad for the 2017 SEA Games. The Philippines got knocked out in the group stage, with Belgira scoring a free kick in a 2–0 win over Cambodia.

=== Philippines ===
While playing in the UFL with Loyola, Belgira was called up to the Philippine senior team by coach Thomas Dooley in 2016 for a training camp. He was called up once more in 2022 for a training camp ahead of the 2022 AFF Championship, but was not part of the final squad.
