= Patrik Franksson =

Filipino-Swedish celebrity and footballer

Personal information
- Full name: Patrik Franksson
- Date of birth: 25 July 1995 (age 31)
- Place of birth: Sweden
- Height: 1.79 m (5 ft 10 in)
- Position: Striker

Team information
- Current team: JPV Marikina

Patrik Franksson (born 25 July 1995) is a Filipino-Swedish celebrity and footballer who plays striker for JPV Marikina. Prior to that, he played for Laos F.C. and Kaya FC–Makati. Franksson also teamed up with Liza Soberano for Goldilocks Bakeshop television commercial.
