= Martin Steuble =

Filipino footballer (born 1988)

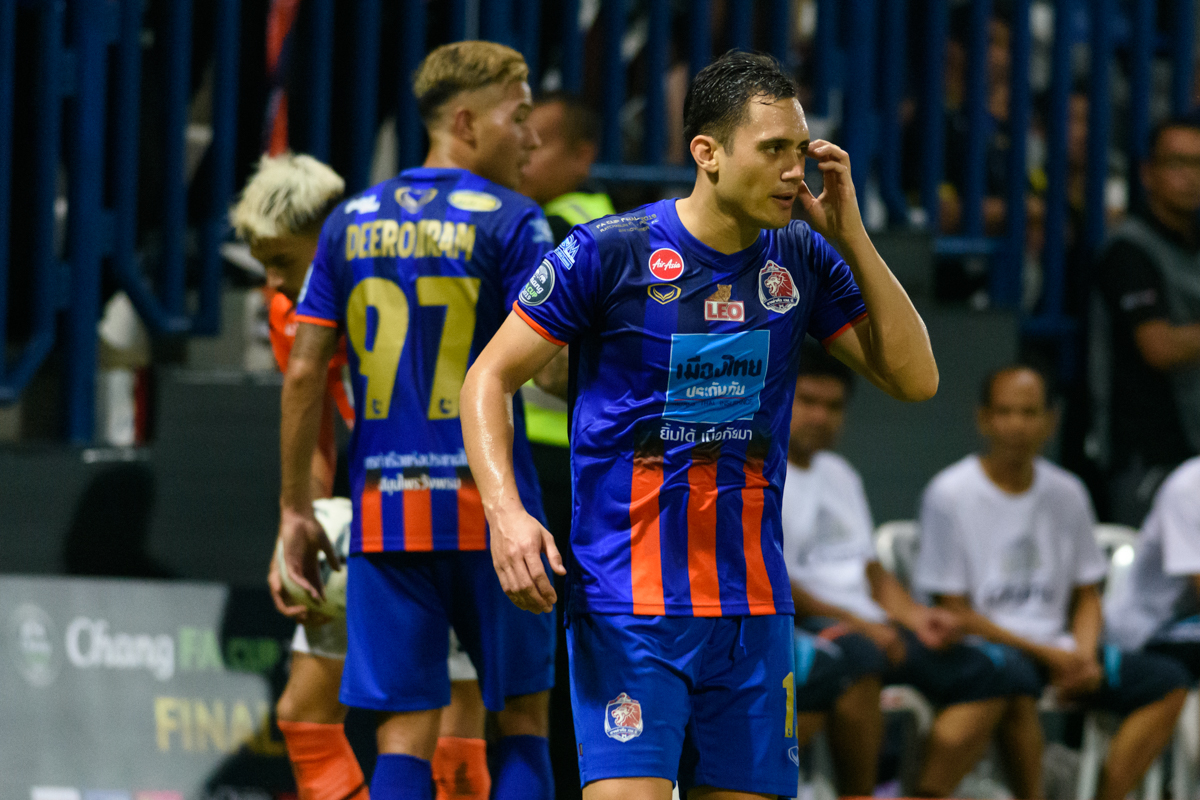
- Steuble playing for Port in 2019

Personal information
- Full name: Martin Markus Pineda Steuble
- Date of birth: 9 June 1988 (age 38)
- Place of birth: Schlieren, Switzerland
- Height: 1.74 m (5 ft 9 in)
- Position: Left back

Youth career
- 1993–2000: Grasshopper Zürich
- 2001–2004: Zürich
- 2004–2005: Grasshopper Zürich
- 2005–2007: Dietikon
- 2007–2008: Neuchâtel Xamax

Senior career*
Years	Team	Apps	(Gls)
2008–2009	Neuchâtel Xamax	5	(1)
2009–2010	Grasshopper Zürich	7	(1)
2010–2011	Lausanne-Sport	16	(3)
2011–2012	Wohlen	29	(4)
2012–2014	Wil	52	(3)
2014	Sporting Kansas City	3	(0)
2015–2019	Ceres-Negros		(3 (Note: From season 2017 to season 2019 only))
2019–2021	Port	24	(0)
2021	Muangkan United	12	(0)
2022–2023	Port	14	(0)

International career^{‡}
2014–	Philippines	52	(4)
- * Club domestic league appearances and goals as of 19 March 2023 ‡ National team caps and goals as of 19 June 2023

Martin Markus Pineda Steuble (German pronunciation: [ˈstɔʏble]; born 9 June 1988) is a professional footballer who plays as a left back. He is currently a free agent. Born in Switzerland, he plays for the Philippines national team.

== Personal life ==
Steuble was born in Schlieren, Canton of Zürich, Switzerland. His mother is Filipino from Bacolod, Philippines.

== Club career ==
=== Sporting Kansas City ===
As a free agent, Steuble joined Major League Soccer side Sporting Kansas City on 16 July 2014, after going through trials at the club.

=== Ceres-Negros FC ===
In January 2015, newly promoted Ceres F.C. of United Football League signed Steuble as addition to the line-up for the 2014–15 PFF National Men's Club Championship.

He continued to play for Ceres when the club joined the Philippines Football League.

== International career ==
In October 2013, Steuble confirmed he would join the Philippines national team and traveled to Manila to settle his eligibility requirements. He made his international debut on 1 March 2014 when he started in a friendly match against Malaysia that ended in a 0–0 draw. In his third cap, he scored his first international goal in a 3–0 win over Nepal on 11 April 2014.

=== International goals ===
Scores and results list the Philippines' goal tally first.

#	Date	Venue	Opponent	Score	Result	Competition
2014
1.	11 April 2014	Grand Hamad Stadium, Doha	Nepal	2–0	3–0	Friendly
2.	25 November 2014	Mỹ Đình National Stadium, Hanoi	Indonesia	3–0	4–0	2014 AFF Championship
2018
3.	17 November 2018	Kuala Lumpur Stadium, Kuala Lumpur	Timor-Leste	2–0	3–2	2018 AFF Championship
2021
4.	11 December 2021	National Stadium, Kallang	Timor-Leste	1–0	7–0	2020 AFF Championship

== Honours ==
=== Club ===
Lausanne-Sport

- Swiss Challenge League (1): 2010–11

Ceres-Negros

- Philippines Football League (2): 2017, 2018
- United Football League (1): 2015
- United Football League Cup runner-up (2): 2015, 2016

Port

- Thai FA Cup (1): 2019
