= The Formation of Islam =

Book by Jonathan Berkey

The Formation of Islam: Religion and Society in the Near East, 600-1800
- Author: Jonathan Berkey
- Language: English
- Genre: History
- Publisher: Cambridge University Press
- Publication date: 2003
- ISBN: 0521588138

The Formation of Islam: Religion and Society in the Near East, 600-1800 is a book by American historian and orientalist, Jonathan Berkey, published by Cambridge University Press in 2003. The book is divided into four parts:

- The Near East before Islam
- The emergence of Islam: 600–750
- The consolidation of Islam: 750–1000
- Medieval Islam: 1000–1500

The book won the 2003 Albert Hourani Book Award from the Middle East Studies Association of North America.
