= Jonathan Berkey =

American historian

Jonathan Porter Berkey is a historian specializing in Islam and the Middle East. He is currently professor of history at Davidson College. He received a bachelor's degree from Williams College, and his doctorate from Princeton University. In 2003 he was given the Albert Hourani Book Award by the Middle Eastern Studies Association for his book The Formation of Islam: Religion and Society in the Near East, 600–1800.

== Works ==
- "The Mamluks as Muslims", The Mamluks in Egyptian politics and society, Editors Thomas Philipp, Ulrich Haarmann, Cambridge University Press, 1998, ISBN 978-0-521-59115-7
- The Transmission of Knowledge in Medieval Cairo: A Social History of Islamic Education, Princeton University Press, 1992, ISBN 978-0-691-03191-0
- Popular Preaching and Religious Authority in the Medieval Islamic Near East, University of Washington Press, 2001, ISBN 978-0-295-98126-0
- The Formation of Islam: Religion and Society in the Near East, 600–1800, Cambridge University Press, 2003, ISBN 978-0-521-58813-3
