= Berker =

Berker is an English-language surname, and a Turkish-language surname and given name. In English, the surname is a variant of Barker, which is an occupational name for a leather tanner.

Notable Turkish people with the surname include:

- Cihangir Berker (1894–1958), a Turkish military officer
- Feyyaz Berker (1925–2017), a Turkish businessman
- Hans Joachim Berker (1924–1992), a Namibian jurist
- Nihat Berker, a Turkish theoretical physicist

Berker Güven (b. 1994) is a notable Turkish actor with the given name.

== See also ==
- Berker, a brand of the German manufacturer Hager Group
