= Hikaru Minegishi =

Filipino footballer

Hikaru Minegishi 嶺岸 光
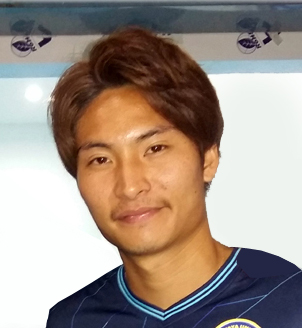

Personal information
- Full name: Hikaru de Asis Minegishi
- Date of birth: 5 June 1991 (age 35)
- Place of birth: Sendai, Miyagi, Japan
- Height: 1.71 m (5 ft 7 in)
- Position: Winger

Youth career
- Urawa Red Diamonds
- 2007–2009: Seiwa Gakuen High School

College career
Years	Team	Apps	(Gls)
2010–2013	Sendai University		

Senior career*
Years	Team	Apps	(Gls)
2015–2017	Global Cebu	49	(30)
2018	Pattaya United	7	(0)
2019	JL Chiangmai United	6	(1)
2019–2022	United City	16	(2)
2023	Uthai Thani	8	(1)

International career^{‡}
2016–2023	Philippines	18	(1)
- * Club domestic league appearances and goals as of 27 May 2023 (UTC) ‡ National team caps and goals as of 06:40, 19 June 2023 (UTC)

Hikaru Minegishi (Japanese: 嶺岸 光, Minegishi Hikaru), also known by his nickname Pika, is a professional footballer who played as a winger for the Philippines national team.

== Early life and education ==
Minegishi was born on June 5, 1991. His Filipino mother is a native of Olongapo while his father is Japanese. He studied at the Seiwa Gakuen High School for his secondary studies and later attended the Sendai University for his collegiate studies.

== Club career ==
=== Youth ===
Minegishi was part of the youth system of the Urawa Red Diamonds. He also played as part of the football team of Sendai University.

=== Senior ===
==== Global Cebu ====
Fellow Filipino-Japanese, Daisuke Sato invited Minegishi to play club football in the Philippines. In early 2015, Global F.C. of the United Football League had signed Minegishi. Minegishi scored 17 goals in 17 league matches for Global in the 2016 UFL season reportedly by October 5, 2016. He was awarded the Golden Ball at the end of the season. Minegishi ended his stint with Global Cebu with a runner-up finish at the inaugural season of the Philippine Football League in 2017.

==== Pattaya United ====
He moved to Pattaya United F.C. and will form part of the club starting in the 2018 Thai League 1 season.

== International career ==
=== Philippines ===
By November 5, 2016, Minegishi was processing his Philippine passport for him to be eligible to play for the Philippines national football team.

Minegishi made his debut for the Philippines in their first group stage match against Singapore, coming on as a half-time substitute. The match ended in a 0–0 draw. In the next group stage match where the Philippines settled for a 2–2 draw with Indonesia, Minegishi made his first international start.

On 22 March 2018, Minegishi scored his debut international goal for the Philippines, scoring the Azkals' second goal in a 3-2 friendly win over Fiji.

=== International goals ===
Scores and results list the Philippines' goal tally first.

#	Date	Venue	Opponent	Score	Result	Competition
2018
1.	22 March	Rizal Memorial Stadium, Manila	Fiji	2–0	3–2	Friendly
