= Aris Caslib =

Filipino football coach (born 1968)

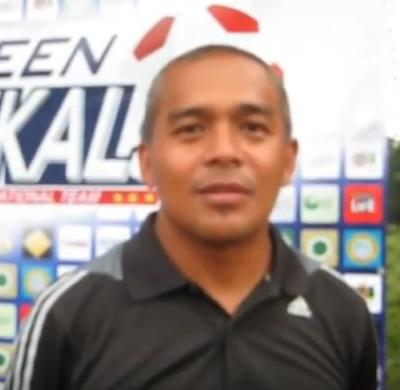

Personal information
- Full name: Jose Ariston Caslib
- Date of birth: February 22, 1968 (age 58)
- Place of birth: Quezon City, Philippines
- Height: 1.67 m (5 ft 6 in)

Youth career
- Claret School of Quezon City

College career
Years	Team	Apps	(Gls)
- San Beda College

Senior career*
Years	Team	Apps	(Gls)
- mendiola fc 1991

Managerial career
- 2004–2007: Philippines
- c. 2005: Philippines U23
- 2008–2009: Philippines
- 2016: Philippines (assistant coach)
- 2017–2018: Meralco Manila
- * Club domestic league appearances and goals

Jose Ariston Caslib also known as Aris Caslib, is a Filipino football coach who last coached Philippines Football League club Meralco Manila. He currently serves as the FIFA Technical Consultant for the Southeast Asian region.

Caslib has also been the head coach of the seniors' football team of San Beda University, the Red Booters. They won the NCAA championship for 8 straight seasons after sweeping the competition, and in October 2008 became UNIGAMES champions.

== Education and youth playing career ==
Caslib played high school football for Claret School and in inter-collegiate tournaments, notably the National Collegiate Athletic Association, for San Beda College (now San Beda University).

While playing for San Beda College, Caslib was active in the student movement as year-level representative in the San Beda College of Arts and Sciences Student Council and political officer of the Makabayang Kabataang Mag-aaral ng San Beda (MaKaMaSa).

== Coaching career ==
=== Philippines U-23 ===
Caslib led the under-23 national team at the 2005 Southeast Asian Games as head coach.

=== Philippines ===
Caslib managed the Philippines squad which competed at the 2007 ASEAN Football Championship. After the team could only manage one draw and two losses, Caslib quit the national team in February 2007. He later served a non-consecutive term as head coach of the national team, last guiding the team at the 2006 AFC Challenge Cup

In 2016 Caslib was appointed as chief deputy of the senior national team under head coach Thomas Dooley. He succeeded Sebastian Stache. He also led the Philippine national team in a friendly against Australian club, Perth Glory FC in July 2016 as head coach in lieu of Dooley.

=== Meralco Manila ===
In December 2016, Caslib was appointed as head coach of Philippines Football League club, Meralco Manila succeeding former Philippines national team coach Simon McMenemy.

In his first and only season with the Sparks, they finished 1st in the regular season and 3rd in the Finals Series of the 2017 Philippines Football League. The club was disestablished in January 2018 with Caslib as its last head coach.

== FIFA ==
In 2020, Caslib was appointed by FIFA as Technical Consultant for the Southeast Asian region.

== Statistics ==
=== Managerial ===
Nat	Team	from	to	Record				
Nat	Team	from	to	Games	Wins	Draws	Losses	Win %
(Philippines)	Meralco Manila	December 2016	January 2018	31	18	7	6	58.06
Total				31	18	7	6	58.06

Updated as of 28 December 2017.
