= Berkey =

Berkey is a surname. Notable people with the surname include:

- Charles Peter Berkey (1867–1955), American engineering geologist
- Craig Berkey (born 1962), Canadian sound engineer
- Dennis D. Berkey, American academic administrator
- Jackson Berkey (born 1942), American composer, pianist, and singer
- James L. Berkey (1930–1982), American set decorator
- Jean Berkey (1938–2013), American politician
- John Berkey (1932–2008), American artist
- Jonathan Berkey, American historian
- Joshua H. Berkey (1852–1911), American Prohibitionist politician
- Russell S. Berkey (1893–1985), United States Navy admiral

== See also ==
- Berkey, Ohio, village in Lucas County, Ohio, United States
