= Agila MSA F.C. =

Agila MSA
- Full name: Agila–Manila Soccer Academy Football Club
- Head coach: Richard Leyble
- League: United Football League
- 2016: UFL, 11th
Home colours	Away colours	Third colours

Agila–Manila Soccer Academy Football Club was a Filipino professional football club which played in the former United Football League, then the highest level of club football in the Philippines. The club was composed of players from the Ateneo men's football team.

== Kit manufacturers and shirt sponsors ==
Period	Kit manufacturer	Shirt sponsor
2011–2016	LGR	Blue Booters
