= OJ Porteria =

Filipino footballer

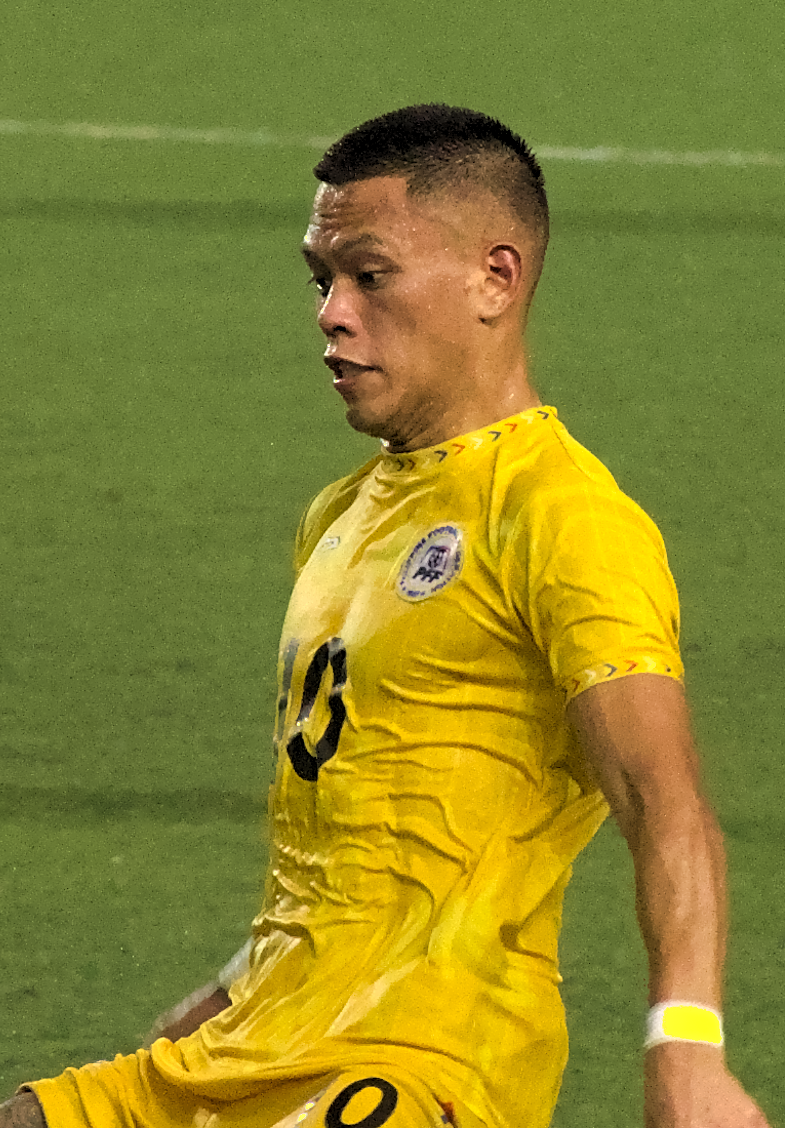
- Porteria playing for Philippines in 2023

Personal information
- Full name: José Elmer Poblete Porteria
- Date of birth: May 9, 1994 (age 32)
- Place of birth: Richmond, Virginia, United States
- Height: 1.68 m (5 ft 6 in)
- Positions: Winger; attacking midfielder

Team information
- Current team: Penang
- Number: 8

Youth career
- –2012: D.C. United

Senior career*
Years	Team	Apps	(Gls)
2012–2016	Kaya–Iloilo	55	(36)
2017–2020	Ceres–Negros	46	(14)
2020–2021	Ratchaburi	5	(0)
2021–2022	United City	13	(1)
2022	Kirivong Sok Sen Chey	6	(2)
2023	Kelantan United	22	(6)
2023–2024	Dewa United	10	(3)
2025	Stallion Laguna	6	(1)
2025–	Penang	19	(1)

International career^{‡}
2012	Philippines U22	4	(0)
2011	Philippines U23	6	(1)
2012–2024	Philippines	38	(2)
Medal record
Men's football
Representing Philippines
AFC Challenge Cup
Silver medal – second place	2014 Maldives
- * Club domestic league appearances and goals as of 8 May 2026 ‡ National team caps and goals as of 21 March 2024

José Elmer Poblete Porteria (/hoʊˈzeɪ ˈpɔːrtæriə/; born May 9, 1994), commonly known as OJ Porteria, is a professional footballer who plays as a winger or attacking midfielder for Malaysia Super League club Penang.

Born in the United States, he is a product of the D.C. United Academy. He moved to the Philippines in 2012 to play for Kaya and Ceres/United City, as well as the Philippines national team..

== Club career ==
=== Youth ===
Porteria started playing football at the age of four after his older brother had taught him and eventually joined his first ever club, The Fireballs. At the age of six, he joined a travel club called Team America where he would play until age 11 when he joined D.C. United's under-13 Super Y-League team and then eventually the D.C. United Academy. He was a member of the academy until 2012, when he moved to the Philippines and signed for local side Kaya.

=== Ceres-Negros ===
In July 2016, Porteria announced the end of his stint with Kaya. In January 2017, Ceres-Negros announced that they have signed in Porteria, along with few other players, to play for the club.

=== Ratchaburi Mitr Phol ===
Porteria left United City on November 16, 2020 and signed a three-year contract with Thai League 1 club Ratchaburi Mitr Phol on December 23.

=== Return to United City ===
In August 2021, United City announced Porteria's return to the club.

=== Kirivong Sok Sen Chey ===
In February 2022, it was announced that Porteria signed for Cambodian Premier League club Kirivong Sok Sen Chey.

== International career ==
=== Philippines U23 ===
Porteria first played for the Philippines at under-23 level when they competed in the 2011 Southeast Asian Games. He was a regular in the side and scored the Philippines' lone goal in the 2–1 defeat to Timor-Leste. In June the following year, he would be part of the Philippines under-22 team that competed in 2013 AFC U-23 Championship qualifiers.

=== Philippines ===
In April 2011, tryouts for the Philippines national football team were conducted in Daly City, California. One of the players who tried out was Porteria. He was successful and was invited to Manila the following month to train with the team ahead of the 2014 FIFA World Cup first round qualifiers. However, he wasn't selected in the final roster for the qualifiers.

In July 2011, Porteria was called up to the national team that traveled to Bahrain for a training camp which included a pair of friendly matches against Bahrain's national under-23 team. He made his unofficial debut in the first match which ended in a 2–1 loss. He would not feature again for the Philippines until August 11, 2012, in a 3–1 defeat to USL Premier Development League team Chicago Inferno.

Porteria made his official international debut on September 5, 2012, against Cambodia, which ended in a scoreless draw. He replaced Paul Mulders inside the second half. However, it was not a FIFA full 'A' international friendly since the Cambodian side used seven substitutes instead of six.

=== International goals ===
Scores and results list the Philippines' goal tally first.

#	Date	Venue	Opponent	Score	Result	Competition
2012
1.	September 29, 2012	Rizal Memorial Stadium, Manila	Chinese Taipei	3–0	3–1	2012 Philippine Peace Cup
2013
2.	February 6, 2013	Thuwunna Stadium, Yangon	Myanmar	1–0	1–0	Friendly

== Personal life ==
Porteria attended Falls Church High School, where he graduated in 2012 and was part of the varsity soccer team and also a kicker for the varsity american football team.

== Honors ==
=== Club ===
Kaya

- PFF National Men's Club Championship third place: 2013
- United Football League Cup: 2015; third place: 2016
- United Football League FA Cup runners-up: 2014

Ceres–Negros/United City

- Philippines Football League: 2017, 2018, 2019, 2020
- Copa Paulino Alcantara: 2019

Penang

- MFL Challenge Cup runner-up: 2026

=== International ===
Philippines

- Philippine Peace Cup: 2012, 2013
- AFC Challenge Cup runner-up: 2014
