= Patrick Reichelt =

Filipino footballer (born 1988)

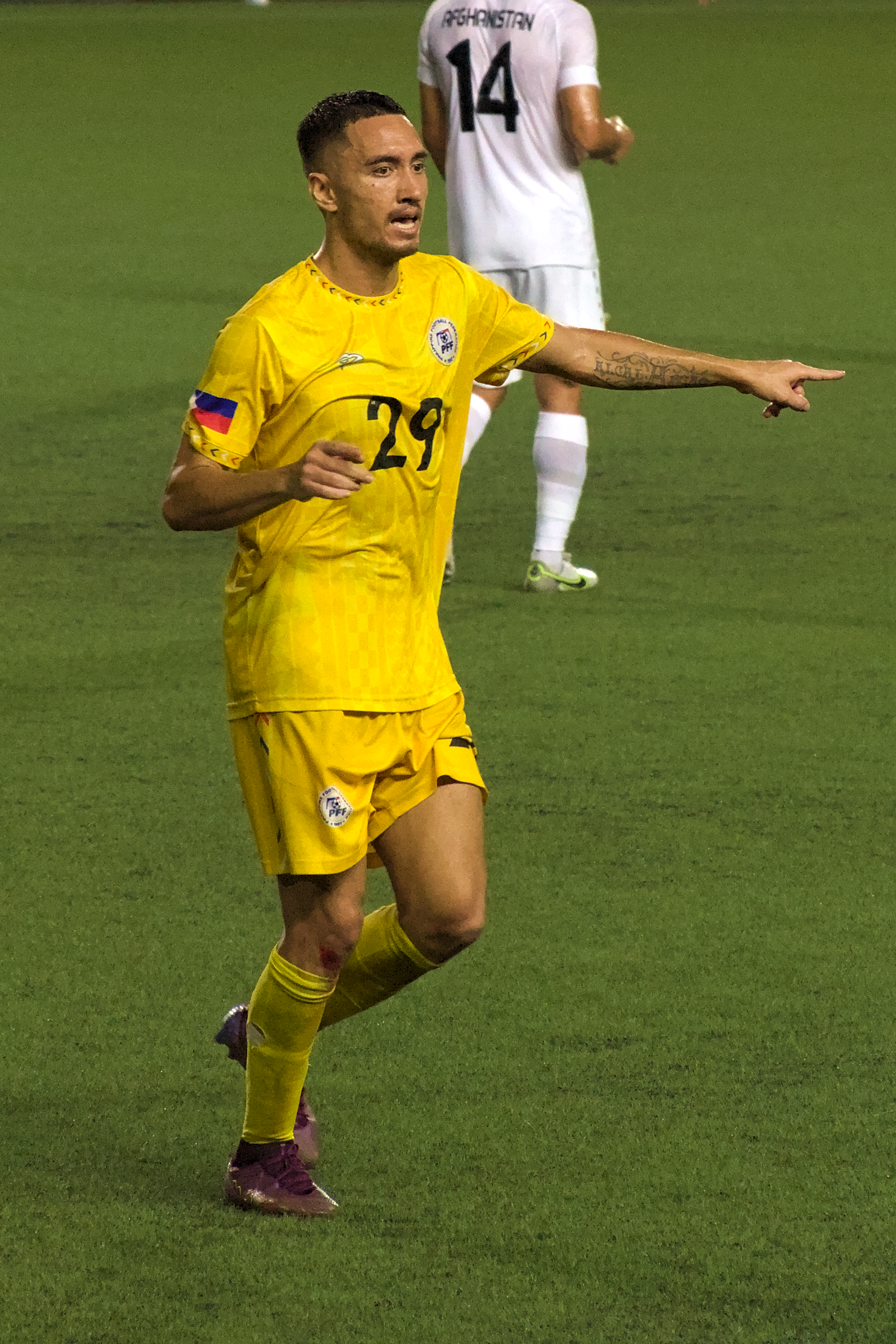
- Reichelt playing for Philippines in 2023

Personal information
- Full name: Patrick Gerry-Anthony Alcala Reichelt
- Date of birth: June 15, 1988 (age 38)
- Place of birth: Berlin, Germany
- Height: 1.80 m (5 ft 11 in)
- Positions: Winger; forward

Team information
- Current team: One Taguig
- Number: 29

Senior career*
| Years | Team | Apps | (Gls) |
| 2007–2009 | Nordberliner SC | 0 | (0) |
| 2009–2010 | Reinickendorfer Füchse | 13 | (2) |
| 2010–2011 | Energie Cottbus II | 5 | (0) |
| 2012 | TSG Neustrelitz | 1 | (0) |
| 2012–2013 | Global | 16 | (8) |
| 2013–2014 | Port | 15 | (4) |
| 2014–2019 | Ceres–Negros | 82 | (52) |
| 2019 | Melaka United | 22 | (9) |
| 2020–2021 | Suphanburi | 39 | (7) |
| 2022 | PT Prachuap | 29 | (1) |
| 2023– | Kuala Lumpur City | 32 | (1) |

International career^{‡}
| 2012–2024 | Philippines | 93 | (16) |
- * Club domestic league appearances and goals as of 14:11; 1 July 2025 (UTC) ‡ National team caps and goals as of 18:30; 21 December 2024 (UTC)

Patrick Gerry-Anthony Alcala Reichelt (born June 15, 1988) is a professional footballer who plays as a winger or forward for Philippines Football League club One Taguig.

Born in Germany, he started his career in the lower tiers of German football. He moved to the Philippines in 2012, where he won the United Football League Division 1 title with Global and another four league titles with Ceres–Negros. He also played in the top-tier leagues of other Southeast Asian countries such as the Thai League 1 and the Malaysia Super League.

Eligible for the Philippines national team through his mother, Reichelt represented them internationally from 2012 to 2024, notably in six editions of the biannual ASEAN Championship.

== Club career ==
Reichelt started his football career in Germany, playing for various clubs including Nordberliner SC 74, Reinickendorfer Füchse, Energie Cottbus II, and TSG Neustrelitz.

Then United Football League side Global was the first Philippine-based club Reichelt played for, helping Global win its first title in his first season with the club in 2012.

He played for Singhtarua F.C. of the Thai Division 1 League for the 2013 season.

Reichelt moved back to the Philippines to play for then UFL side Ceres He stayed with the club, which became Ceres–Negros F.C. when it joined the Philippines Football League in 2017, for five seasons.

Melaka United signed Reichelt in January 2019 to play in the Malaysia Super League. He became Melaka's top scorer for the 2019 season and had an opportunity to continue playing for the club for at least another season. However, Reichelt returned to Thailand in 2020 to join Thai League 1 club Suphanburi. He sustained a head injury in the early parts of the 2020 season and had to play with protective headgear upon his return from injury.

== International career ==
Born in the German capital of Berlin, Reichelt represented the Philippines for which he was eligible through his mother—who hails from Argao, Cebu. He first became involved with the national team in 2011 as a participant of a training camp in Düren, Germany. However an anterior cruciate ligament (ACL) tear on the first day of the training camp forced his exclusion from the 2014 FIFA World Cup qualifiers and the Southeast Asian Games for that year.

He made his debut for the Philippines at the age of 24 on September 5, 2012, against Cambodia which ended in a scoreless draw. Being a vital part of the Philippine national team since then, he played in six editions of the ASEAN Championship (2012, 2014, 2018, 2020, 2022, 2024) and helped the team qualify for the very first time for the AFC Asian Cup in 2019.

On December 22, 2024, just after the Philippines qualified for the semi-finals of the 2024 ASEAN Championship, Reichelt announced his retirement from international football. He explained that his decision was "discussed with the management and coaching staff beforehand" and that his wife was expected to give birth to their first child in a few days. In his 12 years with the national team, he scored 16 goals in 93 international appearances.

=== International goals ===
Scores and results list the Philippines' goal tally first.

| # | Date | Venue | Opponent | Score | Result | Competition |
|---|---|---|---|---|---|---|
| 1. | September 25, 2012 | Rizal Memorial Stadium, Manila | Guam | 1–0 | 1–0 | 2012 Philippine Peace Cup |
| 2. | September 27, 2012 | Rizal Memorial Stadium, Manila | Macau | 5–0 | 5–0 | 2012 Philippine Peace Cup |
| 3. | October 15, 2013 | Panaad Stadium, Bacolod | Pakistan | 1–1 | 3–1 | 2013 Philippine Peace Cup |
| 4. | May 22, 2014 | Addu Football Stadium, Addu City | Laos | 2–0 | 2–0 | 2014 AFC Challenge Cup |
| 5. | May 24, 2014 | National Football Stadium, Malé | Turkmenistan | 2–0 | 2–0 | 2014 AFC Challenge Cup |
| 6. | November 22, 2014 | Mỹ Đình National Stadium, Hanoi | Laos | 3–1 | 4–1 | 2014 AFF Championship |
| 7. | November 22, 2014 | Mỹ Đình National Stadium, Hanoi | Laos | 4–1 | 4–1 | 2014 AFF Championship |
| 8. | November 13, 2018 | Panaad Stadium, Bacolod | Singapore | 1–0 | 1–0 | 2018 AFF Championship |
| 9. | December 2, 2018 | Panaad Stadium, Bacolod | Vietnam | 1–1 | 1–2 | 2018 AFF Championship |
| 10. | September 10, 2019 | GFA National Training Center, Dededo | Guam | 2–0 | 4–1 | 2022 FIFA World Cup qualification |
| 11. | December 11, 2021 | National Stadium, Kallang | Timor-Leste | 4–0 | 7–0 | 2020 AFF Championship |
| 12. | December 14, 2021 | National Stadium, Kallang | Thailand | 1–1 | 1–2 | 2020 AFF Championship |
| 13. | June 19, 2023 | Rizal Memorial Stadium, Manila | Chinese Taipei | 2–1 | 2–3 | Friendly |
| 14. | September 8, 2023 | Kaohsiung National Stadium, Kaohsiung | Chinese Taipei | 1–0 | 1–1 | Friendly |
| 15. | November 21, 2023 | Rizal Memorial Stadium, Manila | Indonesia | 1–0 | 1–1 | 2026 FIFA World Cup qualification |
| 16. | June 6, 2024 | Mỹ Đình National Stadium, Hanoi | Vietnam | 1–0 | 2–3 | 2026 FIFA World Cup qualification |

== Honors ==
Global

- UFL Division 1: 2012

Ceres–Negros

- UFL Division 2: 2014
- UFL Division 1: 2015
- Philippines Football League: 2017, 2018

Philippines

- Philippine Peace Cup: 2012, 2013
