= LGR Sportswear =

Philippine sportswear manufacturing company

- Industry: Textile
- Founded: 1988
- Founder: Sonia Cruz
- Headquarters: San Andres, Manila, Philippines
- Key people: Rhayan Cruz (Executive Vice President)
- Products: Sportswear
- Number of employees: 200+ (2015)
- Website: www.lgrsportswear.com

LGR Athletic Wears, Inc., also known as LGR Sportswear, is a Philippine sportswear manufacturer based in San Andres, Manila. The firm provides the official uniforms of teams playing in major basketball and volleyball leagues in the Philippines. They were also the official kit supplier of the Philippines men's national football team.

The company was established in 1988 by Sonia Cruz in Manila and started a supplier of uniforms for barangay-level leagues.

== History ==
LGR Sportswear was established in 1988 by Sonia Cruz when she transitioned her small one-person dress shop which primarily caters to her local neighborhood into a sportswear design workshop. Cruz business initially catered to teams playing at barangay basketball leagues. One the company's first clients were Colegio de San Agustin and Xavier School. The company provided team uniform to said schools. The name LGR stands for the first letters of Sonia's three children; Lucky, Gary, and Rhayan.

== Notable sponsorships ==
Kits used by the Philippine national football team designed by LGR (2012) (2015–2021)

LGR supplies uniforms to some teams in the Philippine Basketball Association (PBA). In May 2015, LGR reportedly was catering to eighty percent of teams at the United Football League, and all teams playing at the Philippine Super Liga. The company has also provided uniforms for teams participating at the NCAA and UAAP.

It also partnered with Strong Group Atlethics since 2024.

LGR was also the official kit provider of the Philippine national football team from 2015 to 2021. The kit by LGR is used by the national team during their stint at the 2018 FIFA World Cup qualifiers. The sportwear company also previously provided the football national team with kits made by the company in 2012, which was first used in a friendly against Malaysia and was used for the team's campaign at the 2012 AFC Challenge Cup.

== Partnership with Titan ==
LGR has made a joint venture with Titan, another local basketball kit manufacturer to establish the Titan x LGR Design Studio in 2010 which seeks to provides customized basketball kits. The studio was established through negotiations started in 2012. LGR x Titan became official outfitters of three teams from the PBA; the Alaska Aces, Barako Bull, and the San Mig Coffee Mixers.
