= Masaki Yanagawa =

Japanese footballer

Masaki Yanagawa 柳川 雅樹
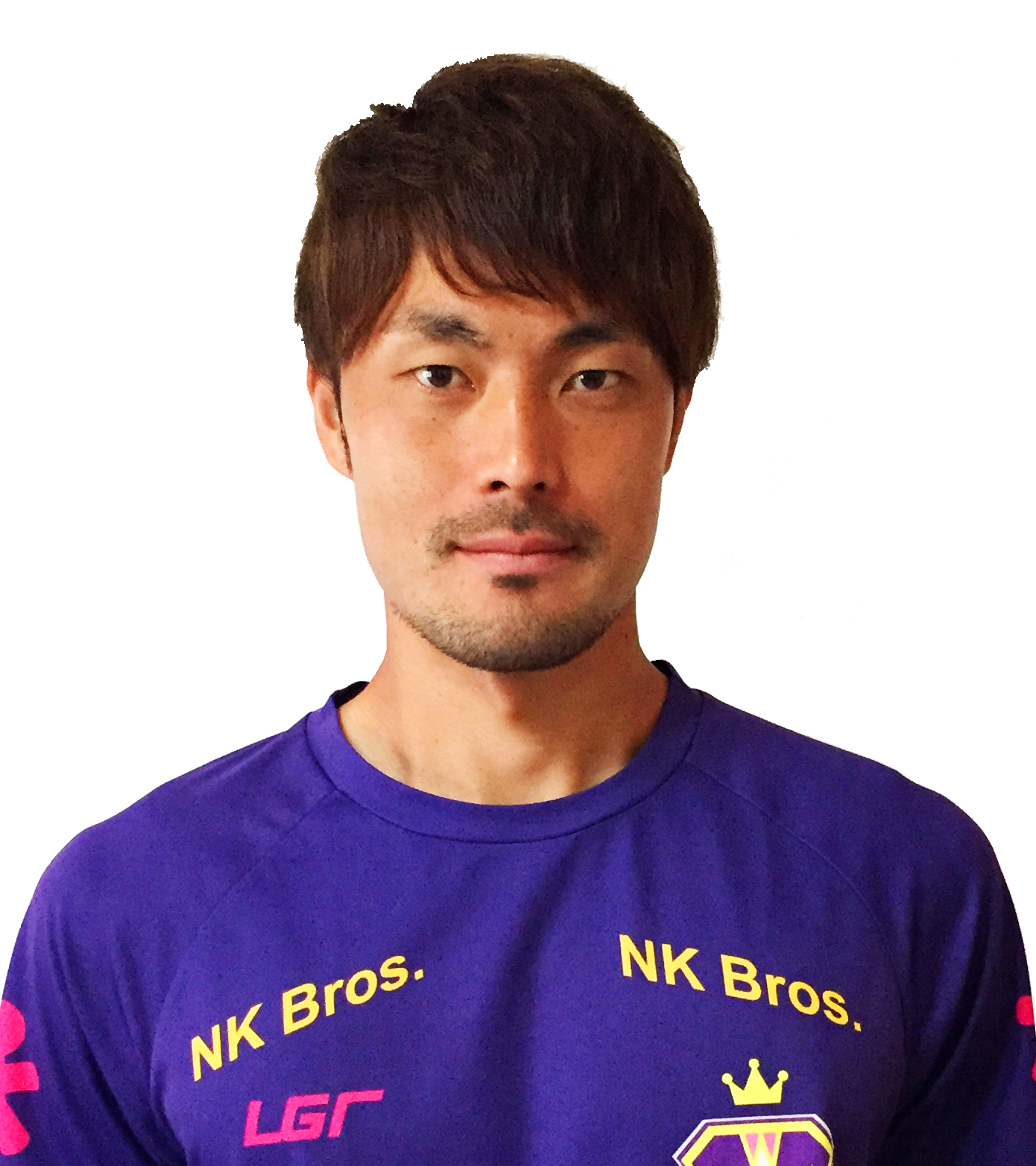

Personal information
- Full name: Masaki Yanagawa
- Date of birth: May 1, 1987 (age 39)
- Place of birth: Sanda, Hyogo, Japan
- Height: 1.84 m (6 ft 1/2 in)
- Position: Defender

Youth career
- 2000–2005: Vissel Kobe

Senior career*
Years	Team	Apps	(Gls)
2006–2011	Vissel Kobe	42	(1)
2010	→Ventforet Kofu (loan)	6	(0)
2011	Thespa Kusatsu	10	(0)
2012	Tochigi SC	4	(0)
2013–2014	Gainare Tottori	33	(0)
2015	Global	16	(2)
2016–2017	Marikina	43	(2)
Total		154	(5)

International career
2007	Japan U-20	1	(0)
Medal record
Representing Japan
AFC U-19 Championship
Silver medal – second place	2006 India
- * Club domestic league appearances and goals

Masaki Yanagawa (柳川 雅樹, Yanagawa Masaki; born May 1, 1987) is a former Japanese football player.

== Club career ==
Yanagawa was born in Sanda on May 1, 1987. He joined J2 League club Vissel Kobe from youth team in 2006. In first season, he played many matches as center back and the club was promoted to J1 League. However he could hardly play in the match from 2007. He moved to Ventforet Kofu in 2010. Although he returned to Vissel in 2011, he had no opportunity to play and moved to Thespa Kusatsu in July 2011. From 2012, he played for Tochigi SC (2012) and Gainare Tottori (2013–14). In 2015, he moved to Philippines and joined Global with Vissel teammate Norio Suzuki. He moved to Voltes (later Marikina) in 2016. He left the club end of 2017 season.

== National team career ==
In July 2007, Yanagawa was elected Japan U-20 national team for 2007 U-20 World Cup. At this tournament, he played 1 match as center back against Nigeria.

== Club statistics ==
Club performance			League		Cup		League Cup		Total	
Season	Club	League	Apps	Goals	Apps	Goals	Apps	Goals	Apps	Goals
Japan			League		Emperor's Cup		League Cup		Total	
2006	Vissel Kobe	J2 League	28	1	1	0	-		29	1
2007	Vissel Kobe	J1 League	2	0	0	0	1	0	3	0
2008	Vissel Kobe	J1 League	10	0	0	0	1	0	11	0
2009	Vissel Kobe	J1 League	2	0	0	0	0	0	2	0
2010	Ventforet Kofu	J2 League					-			
Career total			42	1	1	0	2	0	45	1
