= Laos F.C. =

Filipino association football club

Laos
- Full name: Leyte Association of Organized Sports (LAOS) Football Club
- Founded: 2009; 16 years ago
- Chairman: Reynaldo Harvey German
- League: United Football League
- 2016: UFL, 10th
Home colours	Away colours

Laos Football Club was a professional Filipino association football club based in Quezon City, Metro Manila. The team successfully campaigned in the 2017 Weekend Football League, and previously in the United Football League, the highest level of club football in the Philippines at the time. Inaugural champions of second division in 2009 and 2015 champions of the same division, Laos FC provided its share to the task of nation building through excellence in sports.

== History ==
=== Global as "Laos FC" ===
The club's roots can be traced back in March 2000 when a group of football enthusiasts from Tacloban organized a weekly football practice as their leisure activity. The group which included Dan Palami and some of his employees at his company played their first weekly football games behind the Quezon City hall, and later moving to the Sunken Garden football field inside the University of the Philippines Diliman. Then they began to participate in minor tournaments around Manila, under the name "Laos F.C." with the name of the team derived from the term "laos" which means "has beens".

=== Establishment and participation in the UFL ===
With the renaming to "Global Football Club" in 2009, club owner Dan Palami chose to form a separate team which carried the Laos Football Club name. The team shared its history with Global, and was considered its sister team.

Laos had their first major success in the United Football League (UFL) in the 2015 season, when they won the UFL Division 2 Championship with an unbeaten record. The championship earned them promotion to the first division, allowing them to play in the Philippines' top flight for the first time in their history. But promotion and relegation system was discontinued for the 2016 season which meant that Laos competed in the only division of the 2016 season.

=== Weekend Football League ===
After the UFL was disbanded, Laos joined the Elite Division of the Weekend Football League (WFL) for the local league's 2017 season which saw the participation of the second teams of Philippines Football League clubs, and F.C. Meralco Manila, former UFL club, Green Archers United F.C., Manila Tala F.C, and Kaya Elite FC with the latter two having previous WFL participation.

=== Philippines Football League ===
Laos applied to join the Philippines Football League, intending to debut in the professional league's 2021 season.
