= Forza F.C. =

- Full name: Forza Futbol Club
- Founded: 2002; 24 years ago
- Head Coach: Nor Azlan Nasir
- League: United Football League
- 2016: UFL, 8th
Home colors	Away colors

Forza Futbol Club is a Filipino professional football club based in Alabang, Muntinlupa. The club played in the former United Football League, which was the highest level of club football in the Philippines, and made its professional debut appearance in the 2011 UFL Cup.

== Club staff ==
Job Title	Name	Year	Nationality
Head coach	Jun Mark Sagara	2011–2012	Philippines
Head coach	Nor Azlan Muhamad Nasir	2012–2015	Malaysia
