= Ruben Doctora =

Filipino footballer (born 1986)

Personal information
- Full name: Ruben Doctora Jr.
- Date of birth: April 17, 1986 (age 40)
- Place of birth: Barotac Nuevo, Iloilo, Philippines
- Height: 5 ft 6 in (1.68 m)
- Position: Striker

Team information
- Current team: Mendiola 1991
- Number: 25

Senior career*
Years	Team	Apps	(Gls)
2008–2012	Union FC		
2012–2025	Stallion Laguna	68	(22)
2025–	Mendiola 1991		

International career
2014–2017	Philippines	10	(1)
- * Club domestic league appearances and goals

Ruben "Balot" Doctora Jr. (born May 17, 1986) is a Filipino professional footballer who plays for Philippines Football League club Mendiola 1991 as a striker. He has represented the Philippines at the international level.

== Club career ==
On 17 December 2012, Stallion FC defeated Global FC to win the 2012 UFL Cup at the Rizal Memorial Stadium, Manila to a score of 2–1. Doctora and Spanish striker Rufo Sánchez scored one goal apiece to upset previous league champions Global. Doctora also won the Golden Ball award, the tournament's equivalent to the Most Valuable Player award.

== International career ==
On 3 March 2014, Doctora was included in the starting lineup of the Philippines against Malaysia for a friendly before the 2014 AFC Challenge Cup. On 11 April 2014, Doctora registered his first international goal for the Philippines while playing against the Nepal national football team in a friendly.

=== International goals ===
Scores and results list the Philippines' goal tally first.

#	Date	Venue	Opponent	Score	Result	Competition
1.	11 April 2014	Grand Hamad Stadium, Doha	Nepal	3–0	3–0	Friendly

== Honours ==
=== Club ===
Stallion FC

- UFL Division 1: 2013
- United Football League Cup: 2012

=== Individual ===
- United Football League Cup Golden Ball: 2012
