= Nate Burkey =

Filipino footballer (born 1985)

Personal information
- Full name: Nathaniel George Payos Burkey
- Date of birth: 7 January 1985 (age 41)
- Place of birth: Washington, D.C., United States
- Height: 6 ft 2 in (1.88 m)
- Position: Forward

Youth career
- Louisburg College
- 2003–2005: VCU Rams

Senior career*
Years	Team	Apps	(Gls)
2007–2011	Aegean Hawks		
2011–2013	Kaya	30	(10)
2013–2014	Pachanga Diliman	19	(20)
2014–2017	Ceres-Negros	34	(22)
2017–2018	Davao Aguilas	11	(0)

International career^{‡}
2011–2014	Philippines	5	(1)

Managerial career
- 2022–: Philippines (Assistant)
- * Club domestic league appearances and goals as of 13 June 2013 ‡ National team caps and goals as of 11 October 2011

Nathaniel George Payos Burkey (born 7 January 1985) is a former football player. He spent most of his career playing professionally in the Philippines. Burkey currently serves as the assistant coach of the Philippines national team. He played as a defensive midfielder during his college career and played as a forward at the senior club level and for the national team. Born in the United States, he represented the Philippines internationally.

== Personal life and career ==
Nate was born in Washington, D.C., and grew up in Alexandria, Virginia just outside the U.S. capital. He attended T. C. Williams High School, where he played the center midfielder position for the Titans. Nate's mother has Filipino roots, which made him eligible to represent the country on the international level. With family assistance, he reached out to the federation, joined semi-pro Kaya FC and was named to the national squad after he was invited to tryout in the training pool.

=== International goals ===
Scores and results list the Philippines' goal tally first.

#	Date	Venue	Opponent	Score	Result	Competition
1.	29 June 2011	Sugathadasa Stadium, Colombo	Sri Lanka	1–1	1–1	2014 FIFA World Cup qualifier

== Coaching career ==
=== Philippines ===
In May 2022, Burkey was appointed by Philippines national team coach Thomas Dooley to be his assistant coach in the third round of 2023 Asian Cup Qualifiers.

== Honors ==
=== Club ===
Kaya

- United Football League: Runner-up 2012
- PFF National Men's Club Championship : Third place 2013
