= 2018 Ceres–Negros F.C. season =

Ceres–Negros
2018 season
- Chairman: Leo Rey V. Yanson
- Head Coach: Risto Vidaković
- Stadium: Panaad Stadium
- Philippines Football League: Winners
- AFC Champions League: Play-off round
- AFC Cup: ASEAN Zone Final
- Copa Paulino Alcantara: Group Stage
- Top goalscorer: League: Bienvenido Marañón (14); All: Bienvenido Marañón (17)
- Highest home attendance: 4,681 vs Kaya–Iloilo (April 4, 2018)
- Lowest home attendance: 849 vs Stallion Laguna (August 25, 2018)
Home colours	Away colours
- All statistics correct as of September 22, 2018.

The 2018 season is Ceres–Negros Football Club's 7th in existence and the club's 2nd season in the top flight of Philippine football. Ceres competed in the Philippines Football League, Copa Paulino Alcantara, and AFC Cup. It covers a period from January 16 to September 22, 2018.

They made their first appearance in the AFC Champions League qualifying playoff winning over Burmese club Shan United and securing an upset victory against Australian side Brisbane Roar. They failed to progress to the tournament proper after they were knocked off by Chinese club Tianjin Quanjian.

== Players ==
=== Squad information ===
No.	Pos.	Nat.	Name	Notes
1	GK	(Spain)	Toni Doblas	
2	GK	(Philippines)	Roland Müller	Second nationality: (Germany)
3	DF	(Philippines)	Amani Aguinaldo	
4	DF	(Spain)	Súper	
5	MF	(Philippines)	Mike Ott	Second nationality: (Germany)
6	MF	(Philippines)	Kevin Ingreso	Second nationality: (Germany)
7	MF	(Spain)	Bienvenido Marañón	
8	MF	(Philippines)	Manuel Ott	Second nationality: (Germany)
9	MF	(Philippines)	Paul Mulders	Second nationality: (Netherlands)
10	MF	(Philippines)	OJ Porteria	Second nationality: (United States)
11	DF	(Philippines)	Sean Kane	
12	MF	(Philippines)	Stephan Schröck	Second nationality: (Germany)
13	DF	(Philippines)	Jerry Barbaso	
14	DF	(Philippines)	Carli de Murga	Second nationality: (Spain)
15	FW	(Australia)	Blake Powell	Second nationality: (New Zealand)
17	DF	(Philippines)	Junior Muñoz	Second nationality: (Netherlands)
18	DF	(Philippines)	Joshua Dutosme	
19	FW	(Philippines)	Curt Dizon	Second nationality: (United Kingdom)
22	FW	(Philippines)	Omid Nazari	Second nationality: (Sweden)
23	DF	(Philippines)	Martin Steuble (captain)	Second nationality: (Switzerland)
28	DF	(Philippines)	Jeffrey Christiaens	Second nationality: (Belgium)
29	FW	(Philippines)	Patrick Reichelt	Second nationality: (Germany)
88	GK	(Philippines)	Eduard Sacapaño	

== Competitions ==
=== Overview ===
Competition	First match	Last match	Starting round	Final position	Record							
Competition	First match	Last match	Starting round	Final position	Pld	W	D	L	GF	GA	GD	Win %
Philippines Football League	April 4, 2018	August 25, 2018	Matchday 1	Winners	23	17	3	3	59	21	+38	73.91
Copa Paulino Alcantara	September 1, 2018	September 22, 2018	Group stage	Group stage	3	1	0	2	1	3	−2	33.33
AFC Cup	February 13, 2018	August 8, 2018	Group stage	ASEAN Zonal Final	10	5	2	3	24	11	+13	50.00
AFC Champions League	January 16, 2018	January 30, 2018	Preliminary Round 1	Play-off round	3	1	1	1	4	5	−1	33.33
Total					39	24	6	9	88	40	+48	61.54

Last updated: September 22, 2018
Source: Competitions

=== Philippines Football League ===
==== Standings ====
Pos	Team	Pld	W	D	L	GF	GA	GD	Pts	Qualification or relegation
1	Ceres–Negros (C)	25	19	3	3	66	25	+41	60	Qualification for the AFC Champions League Preliminary Round 1 or AFC Cup Group Stage
2	Kaya–Iloilo	25	15	4	6	58	32	+26	49	
3	Davao Aguilas	25	11	6	8	52	39	+13	39	
4	Stallion Laguna	25	12	3	10	49	45	+4	36 (Note: Three points were deducted from Stallion Laguna due to the club's failure to comply with Liga Futbol Inc. Disciplinary Committee’s Decision No. 010318DC03.)	
5	JPV Marikina	25	7	2	16	46	63	−17	20 (Note: Three points were deducted from JPV Marikina due to the club's failure to comply with Liga Futbol Inc. Disciplinary Committee’s Decision No. 010318DC02.)	
6	Global Cebu	25	1	2	22	18	85	−67	5	

Source: Philippines Football League
Rules for classification: 1) Points; 2) Goal Difference; 3) Goals Scored
(C) Champions

==== Results summary ====
Overall								Home						Away					
Pld	W	D	L	GF	GA	GD	Pts	W	D	L	GF	GA	GD	W	D	L	GF	GA	GD
23	17	3	3	59	21	+38	54	8	0	3	28	9	+19	9	3	0	31	12	+19

Last updated: July 25, 2018.
Source: Philippines Football League

==== Results by round ====
Round	1	2	3	4	5	6	7	8	9	10	11	12	13	14	15	16	17	18	19	20	21	22	23	24	25
Ground	H	A	A	A	A	H	H	A	A	A	H	A	A	H	H	H	H	A	A	A	H	H	H	H	H
Result	W	W	W	W	W	L	W	W	W	D	W	D	W	W	L	W	W	D	W	W	W	W	L	W	W
Position	1	1	1	1	1	1	1	1	1	1	1	1	1	1	1	1	1	1	1	1	1	1	1	1	1

Updated to match(es) played on August 25, 2018. Source: Philippines Football League
A = Away; H = Home; W = Win; D = Draw; L = Loss

==== Matches ====
April 4, 2018 1	Ceres–Negros	2–1	Kaya–Iloilo	Bacolod
19:00 UTC+8	Ma. Ott 75'; Mi. Ott 85'	Report	Mintah 64'	Stadium: Panaad Stadium; Attendance: 4,681

April 14, 2018 2	JPV Marikina	0–3	Ceres–Negros	Manila^{a}
19:00 UTC+8		Report	Uesato 14', 30'; Marañón 64'	Stadium: Rizal Memorial Stadium

April 18, 2018 3	Global Cebu	0–2	Ceres–Negros	Manila^{b}
19:00 UTC+8		Report	Mi. Ott 13'; Schröck 45+1'	Stadium: Rizal Memorial Stadium

April 28, 2018 4	JPV Marikina	1–4	Ceres–Negros	Manila^{a}^{c}
16:00 UTC+8	Suzuki 38'	Report	Marañón 8'; Christiaens 20'; Reichelt 78', 83'	Stadium: Rizal Memorial Stadium; Attendance: 0^{c}

May 2, 2018 5	Davao Aguilas	0–2	Ceres–Negros	Manila^{d}
16:00 UTC+8		Report	Marañón 42'; Mi. Ott 55'	Stadium: Rizal Memorial Stadium

May 12, 2018 6	Ceres–Negros	0–2	Kaya–Iloilo	Bacolod
19:00 UTC+8		Report	Osei 10'; Mendy 40'	Stadium: Panaad Stadium

May 23, 2018 7	Ceres–Negros	3–0	Davao Aguilas	Bacolod
19:00 UTC+8	Porteria 45' (pen.); Marañón 60', 68'	Report		Stadium: Panaad Stadium

May 26, 2018 8	Stallion Laguna	2–3	Ceres–Negros	Biñan
16:00 UTC+8	Melliza 10', 25'	Report	Schröck 55'; Marañón 58', 63'	Stadium: Biñan Football Stadium

May 30, 2018 9	Stallion Laguna	2–6	Ceres–Negros	Biñan
16:00 UTC+8	Sy 73'; Arboleda 77'	Report	Reichelt 9'; Porteria 11', 71'; Mi. Ott 53', 57'; Ingreso 64'	Stadium: Biñan Football Stadium

June 2, 2018 10	JPV Marikina	1–1	Ceres–Negros	Biñan^{e}
19:00 UTC+8	Kozawa 57'	Report	Reichelt 70'	Stadium: Biñan Football Stadium

June 6, 2018 11	Ceres–Negros	2–1	Davao Aguilas	Bacolod
19:00 UTC+8	De Murga 28'; Reichelt 78'	Report	J. Younghusband 14'	Stadium: Panaad Stadium

June 9, 2018 12	Kaya–Iloilo	1–1	Ceres–Negros	Iloilo City
19:00 UTC+8	Felongco 88'	Report	Mi. Ott 86'	Stadium: Iloilo Sports Complex

June 16, 2018 13	Global Cebu	3–4	Ceres–Negros	Manila^{b}
19:00 UTC+8	Roberts 53', 60'; Salenga 70'	Report	Schröck 35', 42'; Mi. Ott 36', 65'	Stadium: Rizal Memorial Stadium

June 20, 2018 14	Ceres–Negros	4–1	JPV Marikina	Bacolod
19:00 UTC+8	Schröck 8', 54'; Mi. Ott 7'; Reichelt 45'; Porteria (red card) 45'	Report	Moriyasu 17'	Stadium: Panaad Stadium

June 23, 2018 15	Ceres–Negros	0–2	JPV Marikina	Bacolod
19:00 UTC+8		Report	Baguioro 58'; Uzokal 87'	Stadium: Panaad Stadium

June 27, 2018 16	Ceres–Negros	2–0	Stallion Laguna	Bacolod
19:00 UTC+8	Porteria 34', 84'			Stadium: Panaad Stadium

July 1, 2018 17	Ceres–Negros	2–0	Stallion Laguna	Bacolod
19:00 UTC+8	Uesato 66', 70'			Stadium: Panaad Stadium

July 7, 2018 18	Kaya–Iloilo	1–1	Ceres–Negros	Iloilo
19:00 UTC+8	Mendy 80'		Ingreso 84'	Stadium: Iloilo Sports Complex

July 11, 2018 19	Kaya–Iloilo	0–1	Ceres–Negros	Iloilo
16:00 UTC+8			Reichelt 15'	Stadium: Iloilo Sports Complex

July 14, 2018 20	Davao Aguilas	1–3	Ceres–Negros	Tagum
18:00 UTC+8	Kim 89'		Christiaens 6'; Aguinaldo 60'; Marañón 70'	Stadium: Davao del Norte Sports Complex

July 21, 2018 21	Ceres–Negros	7–1	Global Cebu	Manila^{f}
19:30 UTC+8	Marañón 18', 48'; Dizon 21'; Powell 69'; Porteria 74'; Nazari 74'; Steuble 89'		Valmayor 58'	Stadium: Rizal Memorial Stadium

July 25, 2018 22	Ceres–Negros	6–1	Global Cebu	Manila^{f}
19:30 UTC+8	Marañón 23', 70', 88'; Mi.Ott 35'; Nazari 39'; Powell 75'		Angeles 75'	Stadium: Rizal Memorial Stadium

August 12, 2018 23	Ceres–Negros	0–3	Davao Aguilas	Bacolod
19:00 UTC+8			P. Younghusband 27', 31'; De Jong 38'	Stadium: Panaad Stadium; Attendance: 959; Referee: Steve Supresencia

August 24, 2018 24	Ceres–Negros	3–0^{g} Awarded	Global Cebu	Bacolod
				Stadium: Panaad Stadium

August 25, 2018 25	Ceres–Negros	4–1	Stallion Laguna	Bacolod
17:30 UTC+8	Marañón 32', 89'; Steuble 49'; Powell 67'		Alquiros 50'	Stadium: Panaad Stadium; Attendance: 849

Note:

a Due to the unavailability of Marikina Sports Complex, the match will be played in neutral venue Rizal Memorial Stadium.
b Due to the bad condition of the pitch in the Cebu City Sports Complex, the match will be played in neutral venue Rizal Memorial Stadium.
c JPV Marikina FC was not able to mobilize adequate security personnel for the match. As a result, it was played without spectators.
d Due to the unavailability of Davao del Norte Sports Complex, the match will be played in neutral venue Rizal Memorial Stadium.
e Due to the unavailability of Marikina Sports Complex, the match will be played in neutral venue Biñan Football Stadium.
f Due to the unavailability of Panaad Stadium, the match will be played in neutral venue Rizal Memorial Stadium.
g Originally schedule on 15 August but the match was abandoned by Global Cebu. Ceres–Negros won 3–0 by default.

=== Copa Paulino Alcantara ===
Pos	Team	Pld	W	D	L	GF	GA	GD	Pts	Qualification	DAV	STA	CER
1	Davao Aguilas	4	3	1	0	9	2	+7	10	Semi-finals	—	0–0	2–1
2	Stallion Laguna	4	1	1	2	4	6	−2	4	Semi-finals	0–4	—	3–0
3	Ceres–Negros	4	1	0	3	4	9	−5	3		1–3	2–1	—

Source: LFI

==== Group stage ====
September 1, 2018 1	Ceres–Negros	1–3	Davao Aguilas	Manila^{a}
19:00 UTC+8	Powell 54'		Hartmann 36'; P. Younghusband 38'; Minniecon 76'	Stadium: Rizal Memorial Stadium

September 15, 2018 2	Stallion Laguna	3–0	Ceres–Negros	Biñan
12:00 UTC+8	Doctora 24'; Melliza 41', 52'			Stadium: Biñan Football Stadium

September 19, 2018 3	Ceres–Negros	2–1	Stallion Laguna	Manila^{a}
19:00 UTC+8	Powell 56'; Mi. Ott 84'		Arboleda 40'	Stadium: Rizal Memorial Stadium

September 22, 2018 4	Davao Aguilas	2–1	Ceres–Negros	Manila^{c}
16:00 UTC+8	Wesley 16'; P. Younghusband 47' (pen.)		Mi. Ott 53'	Stadium: Rizal Memorial Stadium

Note:

a Due to the unavailability of Panaad Stadium, the match will be played in neutral venue Rizal Memorial Stadium.
b Due to the unavailability of Biñan Football Stadium, the match will be played in neutral venue Rizal Memorial Stadium.
c Due to the unavailability of Davao del Norte Sports Complex, the match will be played in neutral venue Rizal Memorial Stadium.

=== AFC Champions League ===
Ceres–Negros made their first appearance in the AFC Champions League qualifying play-offs by virtue of being the champions of the 2017 Philippines Football League season.

==== Qualifying play-offs ====
Ceres–Negros started their AFC Champions League qualifying play-offs with a match against Burmese side, Shan United. Prior to the match, Ceres-Negros only had three training sessions. Ceres-Negros won over Shan United on penalties.

They went on to face Australian club Brisbane Roar which was at that time had already played 17 games of the 2017-18 A-League season and was ranked 7th in the league table. For about five minutes in the second half, Brisbane player Eric Bauteac had to be pulled off the pitch after his kit number peeled off. He was allowed to return to the pitch after the numbers were fixed. Ceres-Negros won 3–2 over Brisbane Roar a result which was considered as an upset leading to calls for the resignation of the Australian side's coach John Aloisi.

Ceres-Negros had to deal with visa issues prior to their match against Tianjin Quanjian in China. The club appealed to the Asian Football Confederation to delay the match so the clubs may be "on equal footing" and make consideration on the basis the Ceres' players are "coming from another continent" but such request was not granted. The club only had their Chinese visas for their players processed in the afternoon of January 29, the day prior to match day, and left for Tianjin on the same day. Ceres-Negros ended their campaign after they conceded two goals in their match against Tianjin Quanjian though their efforts were praised by PFF President Mariano Araneta. Ceres coach Risto Vidakovic was also satisfied with his players' performance.

January 16, 2018 Preliminary Round 1	Shan United (Myanmar)	1–1 (a.e.t.) (3–4 p)	(Philippines) Ceres–Negros	Yangon
16:00 UTC+6:30	Lee Han-kuk (yellow card) 89'; Asare 99'	Report	Christiaens (yellow card) 81'; Schröck (yellow card) 89'; Ingreso (yellow card) 117'; Nyakwe 94' (o.g.)	Stadium: Thuwunna Stadium; Attendance: 257; Referee: Ahmed Al-Ali (Jordan)
	Penalties
	Asare (penalty scored); Chizoba (penalty missed); Nay Lin Tun (penalty scored); Win Min Htut (penalty scored); Nyakwe (penalty missed)		(penalty scored) De Murga; (penalty scored) Schröck; (penalty scored) Ott; (penalty scored) Marañón

January 23, 2018 Preliminary Round 2	Brisbane Roar (Australia)	2–3	(Philippines) Ceres–Negros	Brisbane
19:00 UTC+10	Bowles (yellow card) 32'; Maccarone 35', (yellow card) 90'; Franjic (yellow card) 54'; North (yellow card) 70'; Papadopoulos (yellow card) 72'; Bauthéac (yellow card) 82', (goal) 86'; Oxborrow (yellow card) 85'	Report	Súper (yellow card) 54'; Marañón 43', 65', (yellow card) 66'; Nazari 75'	Stadium: Queensland Sport and Athletics Centre; Attendance: 1,279; Referee: Yudai Yamamoto (Japan)

January 30, 2018 Play-off round	Tianjin Quanjian (China)	2–0	(Philippines) Ceres–Negros	Tianjin
15:30 UTC+8	Modeste 19', 57'; Wang Yongpo (yellow card) 56'	Report	Ingreso (yellow card) 45'	Stadium: Tianjin Olympic Center Stadium; Attendance: 23,310; Referee: Masoud Tufayelieh (Syria)

=== AFC Cup ===
Having been knockout by Tianjin Quanjian in the 2018 AFC Champions League qualifying playoff, Ceres-Negros relegates to the 2018 AFC Cup group stage where they are grouped with three other Southeast Asian teams.

Ceres-Negros ended their home match against Boeung Ket Angkor of Cambodia with a 9–0 win. This equaled the 9–0 win of Uzbek club Nasaf Qarshi over Indian club Dempo in 2011 as the match with the biggest score margin in the AFC Cup.

==== Group stage ====
Pos	Team	Pld	W	D	L	GF	GA	GD	Pts	Qualification	HOM	CER	BKA	SHA
1	(Singapore) Home United	6	4	1	1	15	6	+9	13 (Note: Head-to-head results: Home United 1–1 Ceres–Negros, Ceres–Negros 0–2 Home United.)	Zonal semi-finals	—	1–1	6–0	3–2
2	(Philippines) Ceres–Negros	6	4	1	1	17	3	+14	13	Zonal semi-finals	0–2	—	9–0	2–0
3	(Cambodia) Boeung Ket Angkor	6	2	0	4	8	24	−16	6		3–2	0–4	—	1–2
4	(Myanmar) Shan United	6	1	0	5	5	12	−7	3		0–1	0–1	1–4	—

Source: AFC
Rules for classification: Group stage tiebreakers
Notes:

February 13, 2018 Matchday 1	Ceres–Negros (Philippines)	9–0	(Cambodia) Boeung Ket Angkor	Bacolod
19:30 UTC+8	Uesato 15', 22'; Marañón 19', 29' (pen.); Porteria 31', 85'; Sovannarith 58' (o.g.); De Murga 64'; Ma. Ott 81'	Report		Stadium: Panaad Park and Stadium; Attendance: 2,678; Referee: Zhang Lei (China)

February 27, 2018 Matchday 2	Home United (Singapore)	1–1	(Philippines) Ceres–Negros	Singapore
19:30 UTC+8	Ishak 23' (pen.)	Report	Súper 79'	Stadium: Jalan Besar Stadium; Attendance: 1,331; Referee: Shaun Evans (Australia)

March 6, 2018 Matchday 3	Ceres–Negros (Philippines)	2–0	(Myanmar) Shan United	Bacolod
19:30 UTC+8	Reichelt 79'; Marañón 83'	Report		Stadium: Panaad Park and Stadium; Attendance: 4,294; Referee: Ammar Mahfoodh (Bahrain)

March 14, 2018 Matchday 4	Shan United (Myanmar)	0–1	(Philippines) Ceres–Negros	Yangon
16:00 UTC+6:30		Report	Marañón 14' (pen.)	Stadium: Thuwunna Stadium; Attendance: 231; Referee: Nazmi Nasaruddin (Malaysia)

April 11, 2018 Matchday 5	Boeung Ket Angkor (Cambodia)	0–4	(Philippines) Ceres–Negros	Phnom Penh
18:30 UTC+7		Report	Marañón 36', 38', 69'; Uesato 84'	Stadium: Phnom Penh Olympic Stadium; Attendance: 315; Referee: Mohammad Arafah (Jordan)

April 25, 2018 Matchday 6	Ceres–Negros (Philippines)	0–2	(Singapore) Home United	Bacolod
18:00 UTC+8		Report	Izzdin 80'; Ui-young 90+4' (pen.)	Stadium: Panaad Park and Stadium; Attendance: 5,015; Referee: Hussein Abo Yehia (Lebanon)

==== Knockout stage ====
===== ASEAN Zonal Semifinal =====
May 9, 2018 First leg	Ceres–Negros (Philippines)	4–2	(Myanmar) Yangon United	Bacolod
18:00 UTC+8	Marañón 29', 44'; Reichelt 33'; Súper 63'	Live Report	Sylla 55', 83'	Stadium: Panaad Park and Stadium; Attendance: 8,986; Referee: Aziz Asimov (Uzbekistan)

May 16, 2018 Second leg	Yangon United (Myanmar)	3–2 (5–6 agg.)	(Philippines) Ceres–Negros	Yangon
15:30 UTC+6:30	Uchida 2'; Soe 83'; Sylla 87' (pen.)	Live Report	Ma. Ott 8'; Marañón 78'	Stadium: Thuwunna Stadium; Attendance: 2,481; Referee: Ko Hyung-jin (South Korea)

Ceres–Negros won 6–5 on aggregate.

===== 2018 AFC Cup knockout stage =====
August 1, 2018 First leg	Ceres–Negros (Philippines)	1–1	(Singapore) Home United	Bacolod
19:30 UTC+8	Powell 8' (pen.)	Live Report	Cernak 23'	Stadium: Panaad Park and Stadium; Attendance: 6,705; Referee: Kim Woo-sung (South Korea)

August 8, 2018 Second leg	Home United (Singapore)	2–0 (3–1 agg.)	(Philippines) Ceres–Negros	Kallang
19:30 UTC+8	Shakir 62'; Song 74'	Live Report		Stadium: Jalan Besar Stadium; Attendance: 3,392; Referee: Sivakorn Pu-udom (Thailand)

Home United won 3–1 on aggregate.

== Transfers ==
=== In ===
No.	Pos.	Nat.	Name	Age	Moving from	Type
1	GK	(Spain)	Toni Doblas	46	(Spain) San Fernando	Transfer
2	DF	(Philippines)	Sean Patrick Kane	35	JPV Marikina	Transfer
3	DF	(Philippines)	Amani Aguinaldo	31	Global Cebu	Transfer
5	MF	(Philippines) (Germany)	Mike Ott	34	(Thailand) Angthong	Transfer
1	GK	(Philippines) (Germany)	Roland Müller	30	None (Returned to club after leave)	Return
8	FW	(Australia)	Blake Powell	27	(Australia) Central Coast Mariners	Transfer
13	DF	(Philippines)	Jerry Barbaso	30	Global Cebu	Transfer
20	FW	(Philippines)	Curt Dizon	24	Global Cebu	Transfer
7	MF	(Philippines) (Netherlands)	Paul Mulders	37	Global Cebu	Transfer

=== Out ===
No.	Pos.	Nat.	Name	Age	Moving to	Type
11	MF	(Philippines) (Australia)	Iain Ramsay	38	(Malaysia) FELDA United	Transfer
13	DF	(Philippines) (Netherlands)	Joshua Grommen	30	Davao Aguilas	Transfer
16	MF	(Philippines)	Arnie Pasinabo	32	Kaya–Iloilo	Transfer
21	DF	(Philippines) (England)	Luke Woodland	31	(Thailand) Suphanburi	Transfer
3	DF	(Japan)	Kota Kawase	33	(Malaysia) Uitm F.C	Transfer
9	FW	(Spain)	Fernando Rodríguez	39	(Indonesia) Mitra Kukar	Transfer
9	FW	(Japan)	Takumi Uesato	28	JPV Marikina	Transfer
25	GK	(Philippines)	Michael Casas	32	Global Cebu	Transfer
30	FW	(Philippines)	Nessi Ramos	21	Global Cebu	Transfer
