= 2018 Davao Aguilas F.C. season =

Davao Aguilas
2018 season
- Owner: Jefferson Cheng
- Head coach: Marlon Maro (until May 29); Melchor Anzures (from May 29)
- Stadium: Davao del Norte Sports Complex; Rizal Memorial Stadium (alternative venue)
- Philippines Football League: 3rd
- Copa Paulino Alcantara: Runners-up
- Top goalscorer: League: Phil Younghusband (12); All: Phil Younghusband (16)
- Highest home attendance: 3,765 vs Ceres–Negros (July 14, 2018)
Home colours	Away colours	Third colours
- All statistics correct as of October 28, 2018.

The 2018 season was Davao Aguilas Football Club's 2nd in existence and the 2nd season in the top flight of Philippine football. The club participated in the Philippines Football League and Copa Paulino Alcantara.

== Players ==
No.	Pos.	Nat.	Name	Notes
1	GK	(Philippines)	Patrick Deyto	
2	GK	(Philippines)	Ronilo Bayan Jr.	
3	MF	(Philippines)	Matthew Hartmann	Second nationality: (United Kingdom)
4	DF	(Philippines)	Simone Rota	Second nationality: (Italy)
5	DF	(Papua New Guinea)	Brad McDonald	Second nationality: (Australia)
6	MF	(Philippines)	Jason de Jong	Second nationality: (Netherlands)
7	MF	(Philippines)	James Younghusband	Second nationality: (United Kingdom)
8	FW	(Brazil)	Diego Alves	
9	FW	(Philippines)	Paolo Salenga	
10	FW	(Philippines)	Phil Younghusband	Second nationality: (United Kingdom)
11	MF	(Australia)	Tahj Minniecon	
12	MF	(Philippines)	Jorrel Aristorenas	Second nationality: (United Kingdom)
13	DF	(Philippines)	Joshua Grommen	Second nationality: (Netherlands)
14	FW	(Philippines)	Omar Khan	Second nationality: (United States)
15	MF	(Philippines)	James Hall	Second nationality: (Scotland)
16	MF	(Philippines)	Raymart Cubon	
17	FW	(Philippines)	Jaime Cheng	Second nationality: (Australia)
18	DF	(Philippines)	Julian Clarino	
20	MF	(Philippines)	Dylan de Bruycker	Second nationality: (Belgium)
21	GK	(Philippines)	Ray Joyel	
22	DF	(Philippines)	Dennis Villanueva	Second nationality: (Italy)
23	MF	(Philippines)	Adam Reed	Second nationality: (United Kingdom)
24	FW	(South Korea)	Kim Sung-min	
25	DF	(Philippines)	Tyler Matas	Second nationality: (United States)
26	MF	(Philippines)	Daniel Gadia	
27	DF	(Philippines)	Junell Bautista	
28	DF	(Philippines)	Marco Casambre	
29	MF	(Philippines)	Satoshi Ōtomo	Second nationality: (Japan)
30	DF	(Brazil)	Wesley dos Santos	

== Transfers ==
=== In ===
Pos	Player	Moving from	Fee	Notes	Source
Pre-season
DF	(Philippines) Joshua Grommen	(Philippines) Ceres–Negros	Free		
DF	(Philippines) Tyler Matas	(Philippines) Meralco Manila	Free		
MF	(Philippines) Dennis Villanueva	(Philippines) Global Cebu	Undisclosed		
MF	(Philippines) Satoshi Ōtomo	(Philippines) JPV Marikina	Undisclosed		
MF	(Japan) Takashi Odawara	(Philippines) JPV Marikina	Undisclosed		
MF	(Philippines) Adam Reed	(Philippines) Kaya FC–Makati	Free		
FW	(South Korea) Kim Sung-min	(South Korea) Cheonan City	Free		
Mid-season
DF	(Brazil) Wesley dos Santos	(Philippines) Global Cebu			
FW	(Brazil) Diego Alves	(Thailand) Kasetsart			
DF	(Philippines) Marco Casambre	(Philippines) Global Cebu			
DF	(Philippines) Julian Clarino	University of the Philippines			
GK	(Philippines) Patrick Deyto	(Philippines) Global Cebu			
GK	(Philippines) Ray Joyel	(Philippines) Far Eastern University			
FW	(Philippines) Paolo Salenga	(Philippines) Global Cebu			
MF	(Australia) Tahj Minniecon	(Australia) Nunawading City			

=== Out ===
Pos	Player	Moving to	Fee	Notes	Source
Pre-season
GK	(Serbia) Marko Trkulja	Unattached		Released	
DF	(Serbia) Bojan Mališić	(Indonesia) Persib Bandung	Free	Released	
MF	(Philippines) Jordan Jarvis	(Philippines) Global Cebu	Undisclosed		
DF	(Philippines) Jason Cordova	(Philippines) Stallion Laguna		Released	
DF	(Serbia) Miloš Krstić	(Serbia) Sindjelic Belgrad		Released	
MF	(Philippines) Alexis Cabistante	Unattached		Released	
Mid-season
FW	(Philippines) Ángel Guirado	(Malaysia) Negeri Sembilan FA	Free		
MF	(Japan) Takashi Odawara	Unattached		Released	
MF	(Philippines) Nate Burkey	Unattached		Released	
GK	(Philippines) Nick O'Donnell	Unattached		Released	

==== Loans out ====
Pos	Player	Moving to	Fee	Notes	Source
Mid-season
FW	(Australia) Harry Sawyer	(Hong Kong) Tai Po	N/A	On loan until 2019	

== Pre-season and friendlies ==
February 7, 2018	(Philippines) Davao Aguilas	3–3	(Philippines) JPV Marikina	Manila
15:00 (PST)	Sawyer 75', 77'; Gasic 57' (o.g.)	Report	Flores 46'; Franksson 73'; Altiche 79'	Stadium: Rizal Memorial Stadium

February 17, 2018	(Philippines) Davao Aguilas	3–2	(Philippines) Kaya–Iloilo	Carmona
8:00 (PST)				Stadium: PFF National Training Centre

== Competitions ==
=== Overview ===
Competition	First match	Last match	Starting round	Final position	Record							
Competition	First match	Last match	Starting round	Final position	Pld	W	D	L	GF	GA	GD	Win %
Philippines Football League	March 4, 2018	August 22, 2018	Matchday 1	3rd	25	11	6	8	52	39	+13	44.00
Copa Paulino Alcantara	September 1, 2018	October 27, 2018	Group stage	Runners-up	6	4	1	1	15	4	+11	66.67
Total					31	15	7	9	67	43	+24	48.39

Last updated: October 28, 2018
Source: Competitions

=== Philippines Football League ===
Pos	Team	Pld	W	D	L	GF	GA	GD	Pts	Qualification or relegation
1	Ceres–Negros (C)	25	19	3	3	66	25	+41	60	Qualification for the AFC Champions League Preliminary Round 1 or AFC Cup Group Stage
2	Kaya–Iloilo	25	15	4	6	58	32	+26	49	
3	Davao Aguilas	25	11	6	8	52	39	+13	39	
4	Stallion Laguna	25	12	3	10	49	45	+4	36 (Note: Three points were deducted from Stallion Laguna due to the club's failure to comply with Liga Futbol Inc. Disciplinary Committee’s Decision No. 010318DC03.)	
5	JPV Marikina	25	7	2	16	46	63	−17	20 (Note: Three points were deducted from JPV Marikina due to the club's failure to comply with Liga Futbol Inc. Disciplinary Committee’s Decision No. 010318DC02.)	
6	Global Cebu	25	1	2	22	18	85	−67	5	

Source: Philippines Football League
Rules for classification: 1) Points; 2) Goal Difference; 3) Goals Scored
(C) Champions

==== Results summary ====
Overall								Home						Away					
Pld	W	D	L	GF	GA	GD	Pts	W	D	L	GF	GA	GD	W	D	L	GF	GA	GD
25	11	6	8	52	39	+13	39	6	2	3	27	17	+10	5	4	5	25	22	+3

Last updated: August 22, 2018.
Source: Philippines Football League

==== Results by round ====
Round	1	2	3	4	5	6	7	8	9	10	11	12	13	14	15	16	17	18	19	20	21	22	23	24	25
Ground	H	A	A	H	A	H	A	H	A	A	A	A	A	H	H	H	A	H	H	A	A	H	A	H	H
Result	D	W	D	W	W	L	L	W	L	L	L	L	W	W	W	L	D	L	D	W	D	W	W	W	D
Position	3	3	3	2	2	2	3	3	3	3	4	4	4	3	3	3	3	3	3	3	4	4	3	3	3

Updated to match(es) played on August 22, 2018. Source: Philippines Football League
A = Away; H = Home; W = Win; D = Draw; L = Loss

==== Matches ====
March 4, 2018 1	Davao Aguilas	2–2	Kaya–Iloilo	Tagum
16:00 PST	J. Younghusband 51', 58'; Villanueva (yellow card)	Report	Osei 18'; Tacagni 49'; Felongco (yellow card); Tacusalme (yellow card)	Stadium: Davao del Norte Sports Complex

April 8, 2018 2	Stallion Laguna	0–1	Davao Aguilas	Biñan
16:00 PST	Ko Kyung-joon (yellow card); Nierras (yellow card)	Report	J. Younghusband 38'; Rota (yellow card)	Stadium: Biñan Football Stadium

April 15, 2018 3	Global Cebu	2–2	Davao Aguilas	Biñan^{a}
16:00 PST	Roberts 66', (yellow card); Wesley 89'; Gadia (yellow card); Uzoka (yellow card)	Report	P. Younghusband 20'; Sawyer 43'; Villanueva (red card) 88'; De Jong (yellow card); Grommen (yellow card); Matas (yellow card)	Stadium: Biñan Football Stadium

April 21, 2018 4	Davao Aguilas	3–2	JPV Marikina	Manila^{b}
19:00 PST	Reed (red card) 3'; P. Younghusband 13', 55'; Kim Sung-min 18'	Report	Morallo (yellow card) 9'; Celiz 28'; Fadrigalan (yellow card) 40'; Moriyasu 45+1'	Stadium: Rizal Memorial Stadium

April 29, 2018 5	Global Cebu	0–3	Davao Aguilas	Manila^{a}
19:00 PST	Deyto (yellow card) 29'; Sánchez (yellow card)		P. Younghusband 17' (pen.); J. Younghusband 51', 65'; Hartmann (yellow card)	Stadium: Rizal Memorial Stadium

May 2, 2018 6	Davao Aguilas	0–2	Ceres–Negros	Manila^{b}
16:00 PST		Report	Marañón 42'; Mi. Ott 55'	Stadium: Rizal Memorial Stadium

May 6, 2018 7	Stallion Laguna	3–0	Davao Aguilas	Biñan
16:00 PST	Cordova (red card) 65'; Polli 69'; Melliza 76', 90+2'			Stadium: Biñan Football Stadium

May 13, 2018 8	Davao Aguilas	4–2	JPV Marikina	Manila^{b}
16:00 PST	Kim Sung-min 30'; P. Younghusband 55', 86'; Sawyer 66'		Uzoka 61'; Kozawa 77' (pen.)	Stadium: Rizal Memorial Stadium

May 20, 2018 9	Kaya–Iloilo	4–2	Davao Aguilas	Iloilo City
16:00 PST	Mintah 1'; Mendy 40', 59', 73'; Felongco (yellow card) 36' (yellow-red card) 81'		J. Younghusband 53'; Odawara 69'	Stadium: Iloilo Sports Complex; Attendance: 1,205

May 23, 2018 10	Ceres–Negros	3–0	Davao Aguilas	Bacolod
19:00 PST	Porteria 45+1' (pen.); Marañón 60', 68'			Stadium: Panaad Stadium

June 2, 2018 11	Kaya–Iloilo	2–1	Davao Aguilas	Iloilo City
16:00 PST	Daniels 51'; Bedic 75'		J. Younghusband 72'	Stadium: Iloilo Sports Complex

June 6, 2018 12	Ceres–Negros	2–1	Davao Aguilas	Bacolod
19:00 PST	De Murga 28'; Reichelt (yellow card) 53', (goal) 78'; Ingreso (yellow card) 66'		J. Younghusband 14', (yellow card) 55'; De Jong (yellow card) 31'; Bayan (yellow card) 69'	Stadium: Panaad Stadium

June 9, 2018 13	JPV Marikina	0–3	Davao Aguilas	Biñan^{c}
16:00 PST			P. Younghusband 32'; J. Younghusband 47'; Villanueva 49'	Stadium: Biñan Football Stadium

June 16, 2018 14	Davao Aguilas	5–0	Stallion Laguna	Manila^{b}
16:00 PST	Kim Sung-min 3', 13'; Rota 7'; De Bruycker 51'; De Jong 85'			Stadium: Rizal Memorial Stadium

June 20, 2018 15	Davao Aguilas	3–1	Kaya–Iloilo	Manila^{b}
19:00 PST	Kim Sung-min 26'; Matas 75'; P. Younghusband 85'		Mendy 45+2'	Stadium: Rizal Memorial Stadium

June 23, 2018 16	Davao Aguilas	3–4	Kaya–Iloilo	Manila^{b}
16:00 PST	Kim Sung-min 25'; J. Younghusband 77', 90+1'		Mendy 4', 62'; Soriano (yellow card) 21'; Tanton (yellow card) 41'; Osei 45+3', 90+2'; Bedic (yellow card) 81'	Stadium: Rizal Memorial Stadium

July 7, 2018 17	JPV Marikina	3–3	Davao Aguilas	Carmona^{c}
15:00 PST	Baguioro 20'; Shimono 38'; Angeles 43'	Report	P. Younghusband 17'; Odawara 23'; Sawyer 59'	Stadium: PFF National Training Centre; Attendance: 0

July 14, 2018 18	Davao Aguilas	1–3	Ceres–Negros	Tagum
16:00 PST	Kim Sung-min 89'	Report	Christiaens 6'; Mi. Ott (red card) 37'; Aguinaldo 60'; Marañón 76'	Stadium: Davao del Norte Sports Complex; Attendance: 3,765

July 18, 2018 19	Davao Aguilas	1–1	Global Cebu	Manila^{b}
15:00 PST	Salenga 90+4'		Roberts 14'	Stadium: Rizal Memorial Stadium

July 25, 2018 20	JPV Marikina	0–3	Davao Aguilas	Carmona^{c}
15:00 PST			Kim Sung-min 12'; P. Younghusband 53'; Salenga 65'	Stadium: PFF National Training Centre

July 28, 2018 21	Stallion Laguna	1–1	Davao Aguilas	Biñan
15:00 PST	Arboleda 90+3'		Wesley 38'	Stadium: Biñan Football Stadium

August 9, 2018 22	Davao Aguilas	3–0^{d} Awarded	Global Cebu	Manila^{b}
				Stadium: Rizal Memorial Stadium

August 12, 2018 23	Ceres–Negros	0–3	Davao Aguilas	Bacolod
19:00 PST			P. Younghusband 27', 31'; De Jong 38'	Stadium: Panaad Stadium; Attendance: 959; Referee: Steve Supresencia

August 18, 2018 24	Davao Aguilas	2–0	Global Cebu	Manila^{b}
16:00 PST	Minniecon 63'; Gadia 65'		Jarvis (yellow card) 48'; Nikolić (yellow card) 59' (yellow-red card)	Stadium: Rizal Memorial Stadium

August 22, 2018 25	Davao Aguilas	2–2	Stallion Laguna	Manila^{b}
16:00 PST	De Jong 4'; Hall (yellow card) 35'; Linatoc 50' (o.g.)		Sy 64', 67'	Stadium: Rizal Memorial Stadium

Note:

a Due to the bad condition of the pitch in the Cebu City Sports Complex, the match will be played in neutral venue Rizal Memorial Stadium or.Biñan Football Stadium.
b Due to the unavailability of Davao del Norte Sports Complex, the match will be played in neutral venue Rizal Memorial Stadium.
c Due to the unavailability of Marikina Sports Complex, the match will be played in neutral venue Biñan Football Stadium or PFF National Training Centre.
d Originally schedule on 3 July but the match was abandoned by Global Cebu. Davao Aguilas won 3–0 by default.

=== Copa Paulino Alcantara ===
Pos	Team	Pld	W	D	L	GF	GA	GD	Pts	Qualification	DAV	STA	CER
1	Davao Aguilas	4	3	1	0	9	2	+7	10	Semi-finals	—	0–0	2–1
2	Stallion Laguna	4	1	1	2	4	6	−2	4	Semi-finals	0–4	—	3–0
3	Ceres–Negros	4	1	0	3	4	9	−5	3		1–3	2–1	—

Source: LFI

==== Group stage ====
September 1, 2018 1	Ceres–Negros	1–3	Davao Aguilas	Manila^{a}
19:00 PST	Powell 54'		Hartmann 38'; P. Younghusband 40'; Minniecon 76'	Stadium: Rizal Memorial Stadium

September 22, 2018 2	Davao Aguilas	2–1	Ceres–Negros	Manila^{b}
16:00 PST	Wesley 16', (yellow card) 60' (yellow-red card); P. Younghusband 47'		Mi. Ott 53'; Powell (yellow card) 60'	Stadium: Rizal Memorial Stadium

September 26, 2018 3	Davao Aguilas	0–0	Stallion Laguna	Manila^{b}
16:00 PST	De Bruycker (yellow card) 82'		Arboleda (yellow card) 52'	Stadium: Rizal Memorial Stadium

October 17, 2018 4	Stallion Laguna	0–4	Davao Aguilas	Biñan
15:00 PST			P. Younghusband 40', 83'; Kim Sung-min 70', 84'	Stadium: Biñan Football Stadium

Note:

a Due to the unavailability of Panaad Stadium, the match will be played in neutral venue Rizal Memorial Stadium.
b Due to the unavailability of Davao del Norte Sports Complex, the match will be played in neutral venue Rizal Memorial Stadium.

==== Knockout stage ====
October 21, 2018 Semi-finals	Davao Aguilas	6–1	JPV Marikina	Manila
17:00 PST	Kim Sung-min 34', 52', 60', 74'; J. Younghusband 40'; De Jong 50'		Altiche 73'	Stadium: Rizal Memorial Stadium

October 27, 2018 Final	Davao Aguilas	0–1 (a.e.t.)	Kaya–Iloilo	Manila
17:00 PST	P. Younghusband (yellow card) 75'; Wesley (yellow card) 85' (yellow-red card) 99'; Hall (yellow card) 87'		Tacusalme (yellow card) 74'; Omura (yellow card) 90+3'; Bedic 119'	Stadium: Rizal Memorial Stadium; Attendance: 1,230

== Statistics ==
=== Goalscorers ===
As of October 23, 2018

Rank	Player	Nat	Position	PFL	Copa Paulino Alcantara	Total
1	Phil Younghusband	(Philippines)	FW	12	4	16
2	Kim Sung-min	(South Korea)	FW	8	6	14
3	James Younghusband	(Philippines)	MF	11	1	12
4	Jason de Jong	(Philippines)	MF	3	1	4
5	Harry Sawyer	(Australia)	FW	3	0	3
6	Takashi Odawara	(Japan)	MF	2	0	2
6	Paolo Salenga	(Philippines)	MF	2	0	2
6	Tahj Minniecon	(Australia)	MF	1	1	2
6	Wesley dos Santos	(Brazil)	DF	1	1	2
10	Dennis Villanueva	(Philippines)	DF	1	0	1
10	Simone Rota	(Philippines)	DF	1	0	1
10	Dylan de Bruycker	(Philippines)	MF	1	0	1
10	Tyler Matas	(Philippines)	DF	1	0	1
10	Daniel Gadia	(Philippines)	MF	1	0	1
10	Matthew Hartmann	(Philippines)	MF	0	1	1
Awarded goals				3	0	3
Own goals				1	0	1
Total				52	15	67

=== Clean sheets ===
As of October 19, 2018

Rank	Name	PFL	Copa Paulino Alcantara	Total
1	(Philippines) Patrick Deyto	3	1	4
2	(Philippines) Ronilo Bayan Jr.	2	1	3
3	(Philippines) Nick O'Donnell	2	0	2
Total		7	2	9
