= James Hall (footballer) =

Filipino footballer (born 1989)

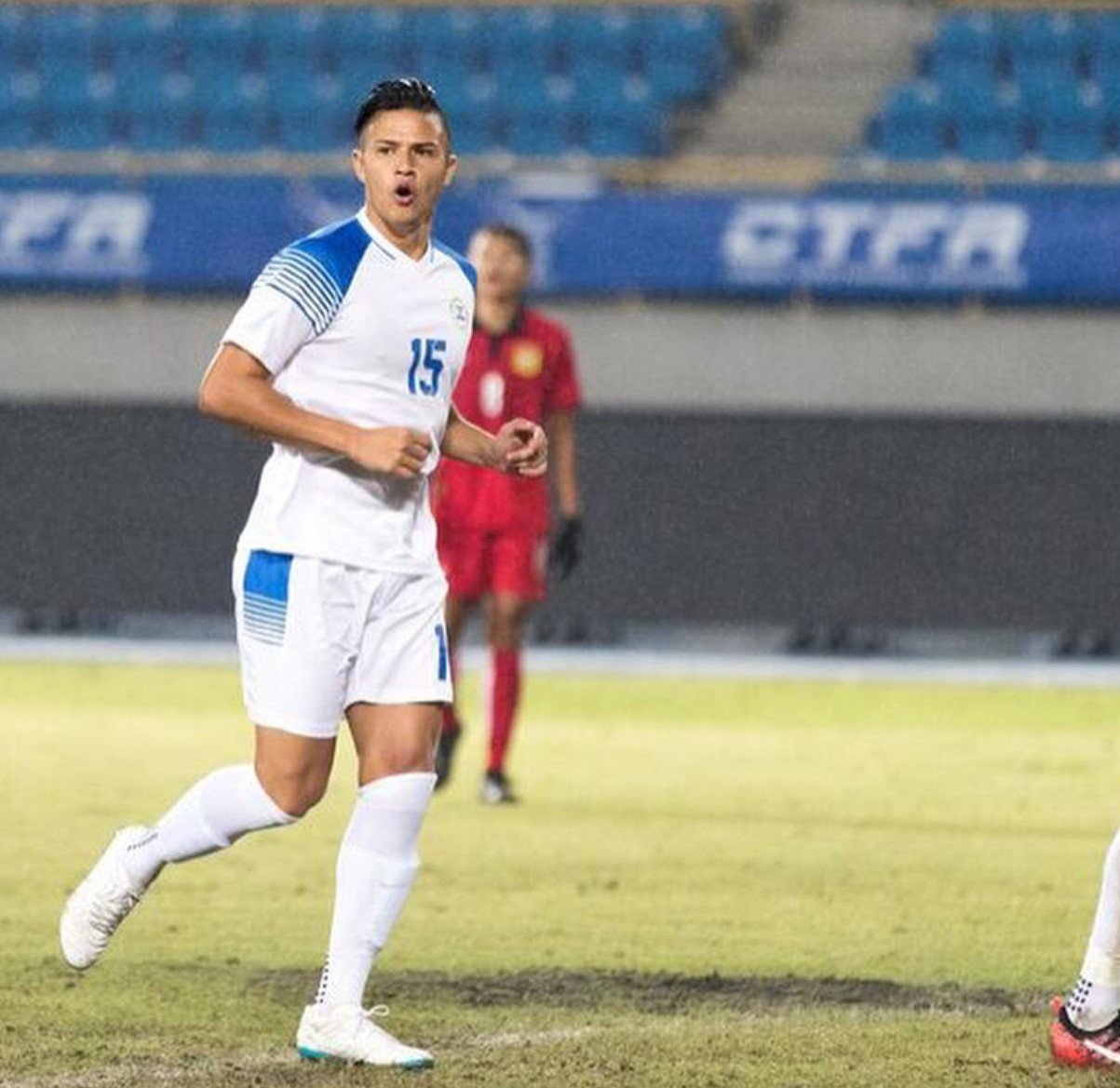
- Hall playing for Philippines in 2017

Personal information
- Full name: Walter James Alonte Hall
- Date of birth: July 16, 1989 (age 37)
- Place of birth: Glasgow, Scotland
- Position: Center midfielder

Youth career
- 2003–2004: Rangers
- 2004–2007: Everton

Senior career*
Years	Team	Apps	(Gls)
2007–2010	Everton	0	(0)
2016–2017	Meralco Manila	0	(0)
2017–2019	Davao Aguilas	9	(0)
2021	Stallion Laguna	0	(0)

International career
2017	Philippines	2	(0)

Managerial career
- 2023–2024: Loyola (assistant)
- * Club domestic league appearances and goals

Walter James Alonte Hall (born July 16, 1989) is a former professional footballer who played as a center midfielder. Born in Scotland, he represented Philippines at international level.

He is a former Philippines national team player. He last served as an assistant coach of Philippines Football League club Loyola.

== Club career ==
=== Youth ===
Hall started his youth career playing for Rangers.

Hall was scouted by David Moyes' father, who worked as a head scout for his boyhood club, Rangers. He was then asked if he would like to join the academy team of Premier League side Everton. In 2004, Hall was handed a two-year scholarship at the club.

In August 2005, ahead of the 2005/06 season, Hall suffered a rupture in his anterior cruciate ligament (ACL) and a tear in the posterior horn of his lateral meniscus, which sidelined him for at least two seasons.

=== Everton ===
Hall signed his first professional contract with Everton in 2007 after being with the club since 2004. He was included in Everton's first team pre-season squad in July 2007, together with players like Mikel Arteta and Tim Cahill, where he was on the bench for most of the preseason games.

Hall never fully recovered from his injury despite numerous surgeries and rehabilitation programs that were performed. Hall left Everton in 2010 after spending six years at the club.

=== Meralco Manila ===
In 2016, after a six-year break from playing football, Hall moved to the Philippines and signed for United Football League club Loyola Meralco Sparks. Due to limits in the transfer window, Hall's debut for Loyola was delayed for a further season. During the 2017 season, the UFL was discontinued to pave the way for the newly-formed Philippines Football League. Loyola then decided to represent Manila and changed their club name to FC Meralco Manila.

=== Davao Aguilas ===
During the midseason of the 2017 Philippines Football League, Hall moved to newly-formed club Davao Aguilas alongside Meralco Manila teammates Phil Younghusband and James Younghusband, signing a four-year deal. Hall was an active member of Davao's roster and started in the final of the inaugural edition of the Copa Paulino Alcantara. They went on to settle at second place after falling to Kaya-FC Iloilo in extra time, 1–0. After two seasons, Davao Aguilas disbanded in 2019.

=== Stallion Laguna ===
In May 2021, two years after being released by Davao, Hall joined Stallion Laguna. The 2021 Philippines Football League was later cancelled due to the COVID-19 pandemic. Hall played for Stallion during the 2021 Copa Paulino Alcantara. They went on to finish third overall after defeating Dynamic Herb Cebu via penalties in the third-place play-off. He left the club in December 2021 and retired from playing professionally.

== International career ==
Hall was born in Scotland to an English father and Filipina mother, making him eligible to represent England, Scotland or the Philippines at international level.

=== Philippines ===
After the Philippines national team rose to fame in the 2010 AFF Suzuki Cup, Hall was among the new players that were called up by the Philippines alongside his brother Ryan ahead of their 2012 AFC Challenge Cup qualifying matches against Mongolia.

A few months later, Hall was again called up for the Philippines in a training camp held in Bahrain, in line with the national team's preparation for the second round of the 2014 FIFA World Cup Qualifiers. Hall played two unofficial games for the Philippines, starting both friendlies against the Bahrain U-23 national team and playing as a center midfielder. Hall suited up for the Philippines once more in the 2017 CTFA International Tournament. He made his official debut for the Philippines in a 3–1 victory against Laos. Hall picked up two official senior national team caps under caretaker coach Marlon Maro as they went on to finish second overall in the tournament.

== Managerial career ==
As early as 2010, Hall started getting his coaching licenses. He received his FA Level 2 license in November 2010. More than a decade later, after deciding to retire from playing professionally, Hall was one of the coaches who participated in the PFF 'C' Diploma Course. Hall received his AFC 'C' license in May 2023.

=== Loyola ===
In April 2023, Loyola announced their return to the top flight and confirmed their participation in the 2023 Copa Paulino Alcantara. Hall then returned to Loyola and was appointed assistant coach to Roxy Dorlas alongside former youth national team coach Kit Salanguit and Kim Sung-min, his former teammate at Davao Aguilas. During the last game of the 2024 Philippines Football League season against Kaya F.C.–Iloilo, Hall took over as the caretaker manager. Loyola eventually lost 3–0 to the defending champions.

== Personal life ==
Hall was born in Glasgow, Scotland. His mother Helen Alonte hails from Bacolod, Negros Occidental while his father Andy Hall is from England.

== Honors ==
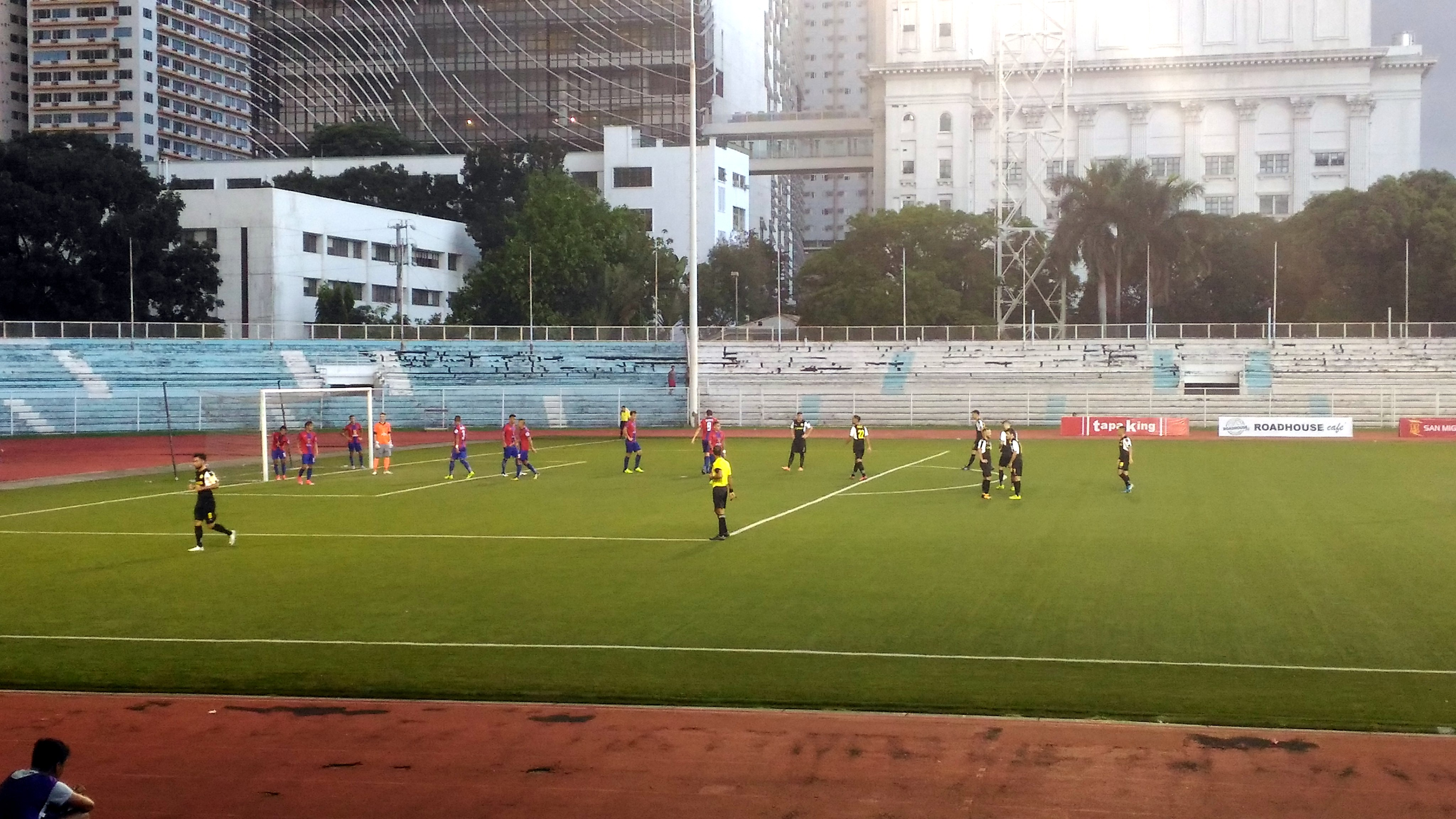
2018 Copa Paulino Alcantara Final

=== Club ===
Davao Aguilas

- Copa Paulino Alcantara runner-up: 2018

=== National team ===
Philippines

- CTFA International Tournament runner-up: 2017
