= 2018 Copa Paulino Alcantara =

1st season of the Copa Paulino Alcantara

Tournament details
- Country: Philippines
- Dates: September 1 – October 27
- Teams: 6

Final positions
- Champions: Kaya–Iloilo (1st title)

Tournament statistics
- Matches played: 15
- Goals scored: 52 (3.47 per match)
- Top goal scorer: Robert Lopez Mendy (9 goals)

The 2018 Copa Paulino Alcantara was the first edition of the Copa Paulino Alcantara, the domestic football cup competition of the Philippines. The competition started on September 1, 2018 and concluded on October 27, 2018, with Kaya–Iloilo winning the inaugural tournament after defeating Davao Aguilas 1–0 in extra time.

The winners qualified for the 2019 AFC Cup.

== Participating clubs ==
All six clubs of the 2018 Philippines Football League are eligible to participate in the tournament. On July 15, 2018, during the PFL Fans Day, it was announced that non-franchise clubs will also be allowed to join the cup competition provided that they satisfy minimum licensing requirements which will be set for the competition. But only clubs in the PFL joined the tournament.

Philippines Football League
the 6 teams of the 2018 season
- Ceres–Negros
- Davao Aguilas
- Global Cebu
- JPV Marikina
- Kaya–Iloilo
- Stallion Laguna

== Format ==
=== Competition ===
The Copa Paulino Alcantara commenced on September 1, 2018, with a group phase of two groups with three teams each. A round robin format with home and away legs was used for this phase. The top two teams advance to the semifinals with the group winners facing the runner-up team from the other group. The higher seeded teams hosted the one-off semifinals. The final consisted of a single match as well.

=== Draw ===
A draw to determine the composition of the groupings for the group phase was held on August 26, 2018.

Pot 1 (Seeded Teams)	Pot 2 (Non-seeded Teams)	
Ceres–Negros (PFL Champion); Kaya–Iloilo (PFL Runner-up)	Davao Aguilas; Global Cebu	JPV Marikina; Stallion Laguna

== Group stage ==
Key to colours in group tables
Group winners and runners-up advance to the semifinals

=== Group A ===
Pos	Team	Pld	W	D	L	GF	GA	GD	Pts	Qualification	DAV	STA	CER
1	Davao Aguilas	4	3	1	0	9	2	+7	10	Semi-finals	—	0–0	2–1
2	Stallion Laguna	4	1	1	2	4	6	−2	4	Semi-finals	0–4	—	3–0
3	Ceres–Negros	4	1	0	3	4	9	−5	3		1–3	2–1	—

Source: LFI

September 1, 2018 1	Ceres–Negros	1–3	Davao Aguilas	Manila
19:00 UTC+8	Powell 54'		Hartmann 36'; P. Younghusband 38'; Minniecon 76'	Stadium: Rizal Memorial Stadium

September 15, 2018 2	Stallion Laguna	3–0	Ceres–Negros	Biñan^{a}
12:00 UTC+8	Doctora 24'; Melliza 41', 52'			Stadium: Biñan Football Stadium

September 19, 2018 3	Ceres–Negros	2–1	Stallion Laguna	Manila
19:00 UTC+8	Powell 56'; M. Ott 84'		Arboleda 40'	Stadium: Rizal Memorial Stadium

September 22, 2018 4	Davao Aguilas	2–1	Ceres–Negros	Manila
16:00 UTC+8	Wesley 16'; P. Younghusband 47' (pen.)		M. Ott 53'	Stadium: Rizal Memorial Stadium

September 26, 2018 5	Davao Aguilas	0–0	Stallion Laguna	Manila
16:00 UTC+8				Stadium: Rizal Memorial Stadium

October 17, 2018 6	Stallion Laguna	0–4	Davao Aguilas	Biñan
15:00 UTC+8			P. Younghusband 40', 83'; Kim Sung-min 70', 84'	Stadium: Biñan Football Stadium

=== Group B ===
Pos	Team	Pld	W	D	L	GF	GA	GD	Pts	Qualification	KAY	JPV	GLO
1	Kaya–Iloilo	4	3	1	0	9	3	+6	10	Semi-finals	—	1–0	4–0
2	JPV Marikina	4	2	0	2	6	6	0	6	Semi-finals	0–1	—	4–3
3	Global Cebu	4	0	1	3	7	13	−6	1		3–3	1–2	—

Source: LFI

September 1, 2018 1	Kaya–Iloilo	4–0	Global Cebu	Manila
16:00 UTC+8	Lopez Mendy 23', 55', 62'; Tanton 49'			Stadium: Rizal Memorial Stadium

September 15, 2018 2	JPV Marikina	4–3	Global Cebu	Carmona
15:00 UTC+8	Moriyasu 28'; Uzoka 57'; Angeles 69'; Shimono 73'		Nikolić 38'; Roberts 65'; Lee Jeong-min 85'	Stadium: PFF National Training Centre

September 19, 2018 3	Kaya–Iloilo	1–0	JPV Marikina	Manila
16:00 UTC+8	Osei 75'			Stadium: Rizal Memorial Stadium

September 23, 2018 4	Global Cebu	3–3	Kaya–Iloilo	Manila
19:00 UTC+8	Beloya 3'; Beaton 56'; Jarvis 63'		Tanton 24'; Lopez Mendy 58', 73'	Stadium: Rizal Memorial Stadium

September 26, 2018 5	Global Cebu	1–2	JPV Marikina	Manila
19:00 UTC+8	Jarvis 77'		Uzoka 39'; Moriyasu 62'	Stadium: Rizal Memorial Stadium

October 17, 2018 6	JPV Marikina	0–1	Kaya–Iloilo	Carmona
15:00 UTC+8			Lopez Mendy 5'	Stadium: PFF National Training Centre

== Knock-out stage ==
=== Bracket ===
Semi-finals; October 21
A1	Davao Aguilas	6
B2	JPV Marikina	1
B1	Kaya–Iloilo	3
A2	Stallion Laguna	2

Final; October 27
W1	Davao Aguilas	0
W2	Kaya–Iloilo (a.e.t.)	1

=== Semi-finals ===
October 21, 2018 Semi-final	Davao Aguilas	6–1	JPV Marikina	Manila^{b}
17:00 UTC+8	Kim Sung-min 34', 52', 60', 74'; J. Younghusband 40'; De Jong 50'		Altiche 73'	Stadium: Rizal Memorial Stadium

October 21, 2018 Semi-final	Kaya–Iloilo	3–2	Stallion Laguna	Iloilo City
14:30 UTC+8	Lopez Mendy 3', 15', 47'		Arboleda 20'; Polli 43'	Stadium: Iloilo Sports Complex

=== Final ===
October 27, 2018 Championship	Davao Aguilas	0–1 (a.e.t.)	Kaya–Iloilo	Manila
17:00 UTC+8			Bedic 119'	Stadium: Rizal Memorial Stadium; Attendance: 1,230

== Top scorers ==
Team eliminated / inactive for this round.

Rank	Player	Team	MD1	MD2	MD3	MD4	SF	F	Total
1	(Senegal) Robert Lopez Mendy	Kaya–Iloilo	3		2	1	3		9
2	(South Korea) Kim Sungmin	Davao Aguilas				2	4		6
3	(Philippines) Phil Younghusband	Davao Aguilas	1	1		2			4
4	(Philippines) Fitch Arboleda	Stallion Laguna	1				1		2
4	(Philippines) Jordan Jarvis	Global Cebu			1	1			2
4	(Philippines) Jesus Melliza	Stallion Laguna	2						2
4	(Japan) Keigo Moriyasu	JPV Marikina	1		1				2
4	(Australia) Blake Powell	Ceres-Negros	1		1				2
4	(Philippines) Miguel Tanton	Kaya–Iloilo	1		1				2
4	(Philippines) Kennedy Uzoka	JPV Marikina	1		1				2

== Notes ==
a Match was moved from the Rizal Memorial Stadium in Manila to Biñan Football Stadium in Biñan to anticipated bad weather due to Typhoon Mangkhut (Ompong).
b Davao Aguilas by topping their group were given the right to play their semifinal match at home but due to the unavailability of their home stadium at the Davao del Norte Sports Complex in Tagum, the club opted to play their semifinal match at the Rizal Memorial Stadium in Manila.
