= Nick O'Donnell =

Nick O'Donnell may refer to:

- Nick O'Donnell (hurler)
- Nick O'Donnell (footballer)
