= Wesley Rodrigues =

Brazilian footballer

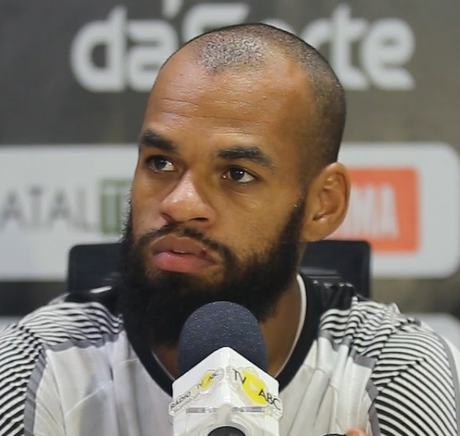
- Wesley in 2024

Personal information
- Full name: Wesley dos Santos Rodrigues
- Date of birth: 2 April 1992 (age 34)
- Place of birth: Paranaguá, Brazil
- Height: 1.86 m (6 ft 1 in)
- Position: Centre-back

Team information
- Current team: São José-SP
- Number: 3

Youth career
- 2006–2012: Coritiba

Senior career*
Years	Team	Apps	(Gls)
2012	Coritiba	0	(0)
2012	→ Rio Branco-PR (loan)	3	(0)
2012	→ Junior Team (loan)		
2013	Marília	1	(0)
2014	Parnahyba	15	(1)
2014	VOCEM	7	(0)
2014	Hercílio Luz	6	(1)
2015	Foz do Iguaçu	12	(1)
2015	Botafogo-PB	1	(0)
2016	Ypiranga-RS	11	(1)
2016	Maringá	4	(0)
2016	União Beltrão		
2017–2018	Global Cebu	25	(5)
2018	Davao Aguilas	12	(1)
2019	São Bento	19	(0)
2020	Boa Esporte	23	(0)
2021	Nam Định	12	(1)
2022	Camboriú	13	(2)
2022	Caxias	20	(2)
2023	Barra-SC	3	(0)
2023	Maringá	22	(0)
2023	→ Paysandu (loan)	1	(0)
2024	ABC	17	(0)
2024	Floresta	0	(0)
2025–2026	Cianorte	38	(2)
2026	Pouso Alegre	6	(0)
2026–	São José-SP	0	(0)
- * Club domestic league appearances and goals as of 14:25, 16 June 2026 (UTC)

Wesley dos Santos Rodrigues (born 2 April 1992), known as Wesley Rodrigues or just Wesley, is a Brazilian footballer who plays as a centre-back for São José-SP.

== Career ==
Born in Paranaguá, Paraná, Wesley represented Coritiba as a youth, but made his senior debut while on loan at Rio Branco-PR in 2012. In 2013, after another loan spell at Junior Team, he moved to Marília, but was rarely used.

In January 2015, after playing for Parnahyba, VOCEM and Hercílio Luz the previous year, Wesley was included in Foz do Iguaçu's squad for the Campeonato Paranaense. In April, he signed for Série C side Botafogo-PB, but featured in just one match for the club.

On 24 November 2015, Wesley agreed to a deal with Ypiranga-RS for the upcoming season. Regularly used during the 2016 Campeonato Gaúcho, he moved to Maringá in May, but ended the year at União Beltrão.

In 2017, Wesley moved abroad for the first time in his career and joined Global Cebu of the Philippines Football League. He left the club in May 2018, and signed for fellow league team Davao Aguilas on 1 June.

On 10 December 2018, Wesley returned to his home country after being announced at Série B side São Bento. He moved to third division side Boa Esporte on 3 November 2019, and signed for Nam Định in Vietnam in December 2020.

Wesley left Nam Định after the remaining matches of the 2021 V.League 1 were cancelled, and returned to Brazil with Altos in November of that year. However, the deal fell through, and he joined Camboriú on 8 January 2022.

Wesley subsequently had short spells at Caxias and Barra-SC before returning to Maringá in February 2023. He renewed his contract with the latter until October 2025 in August, before being loaned out to Paysandu.

Wesley terminated his link with Dogão on 8 December 2023, and was announced at ABC two days later. On 4 November 2024, he joined Floresta for the year's Copa Fares Lopes.

On 11 January 2025, Wesley agreed to a deal with Cianorte. On 2 April of the following year, he was announced at Pouso Alegre, but moved to São José-SP on 15 June, after Pousão's elimination from the 2026 Série D.

== Career statistics ==
As of 16 June 2026.

Club	Season	League			State league		Cup (Note: Includes Copa do Brasil, Copa Paulino Alcantara)		Continental		Other		Total	
Club	Season	Division	Apps	Goals	Apps	Goals	Apps	Goals	Apps	Goals	Apps	Goals	Apps	Goals
Rio Branco-PR	2012	Paranaense	—		3	0	—		—		—		3	0
Marília	2013	Paulista A3	—		1	0	—		—		—		1	0
Parnahyba	2014	Piauiense	—		15	1	2	0	—		—		17	1
VOCEM	2014	Paulista 2ª Divisão	—		7	0	—		—		—		7	0
Hercílio Luz	2014	Catarinense Série B	—		6	1	—		—		—		6	1
Foz do Iguaçu	2015	Série D	—		12	1	—		—		—		12	1
Botafogo-PB	2015	Série C	1	0	—		—		—		—		1	0
Ypiranga-RS	2016	Série C	—		11	1	2	0	—		—		13	1
Maringá	2016	Série D	4	0	—		—		—		—		4	0
Global Cebu	2017	PFL	20	4	—		—		7 (Note: Appearance(s) in AFC Cup)	0	6 (Note: Appearance(s) in Singapore Cup)	1	33	5
Global Cebu	2018	PFL	5	1	—		—		6	1	—		11	2
Global Cebu	Total		25	5	—		—		13	1	6	1	44	7
Davao Aguilas	2018	PFL	12	1	—		6	1	—		—		18	2
São Bento	2019	Série B	15	0	4	0	—		—		—		19	0
Boa Esporte	2020	Série C	11	0	12	0	2	0	—		—		25	0
Nam Định	2021	V.League 1	12	1	—		—		—		—		12	1
Camboriú	2022	Catarinense	—		13	2	—		—		—		13	2
Caxias	2022	Série D	20	2	—		—		—		—		20	2
Barra-SC	2023	Catarinense	—		3	0	—		—		—		3	0
Maringá	2023	Série D	15	0	7	0	4	0	—		—		26	0
Paysandu	2023	Série C	1	0	—		—		—		—		1	0
ABC	2024	Série C	7	0	10	0	2	0	—		8 (Note: Appearance(s) in Copa do Nordeste)	0	27	0
Floresta	2024	Série C	—		—		—		—		8 (Note: Appearance(s) in Copa Fares Lopes)	3	8	3
Cianorte	2025	Série D	18	1	13	1	—		—		10 (Note: Appearance(s) in Taça FPF)	0	41	2
Cianorte	2026	Série D	—		7	0	1	0	—		—		8	0
Cianorte	Total		18	1	20	1	1	0	—		10	0	49	2
Pouso Alegre	2026	Série D	6	0	—		—		—		—		6	0
São José-SP	2026	Paulista A2	—		—		—		—		0	0	0	0
Career total			147	10	124	7	19	1	13	1	32	4	335	23

== Honours ==
União Beltrão

- Campeonato Paranaense Série Bronze: 2016

Cianorte

- Taça FPF: 2025
