= Franco de la Torre =

Filipino footballer

Personal information
- Full name: Rey Franco Miguel Bautro de la Torre
- Date of birth: November 20, 1996 (age 29)
- Place of birth: Cagayan de Oro, Philippines
- Positions: Full-back; midfielder

Team information
- Current team: Mendiola 1991
- Number: 12

College career
Years	Team	Apps	(Gls)
–2016	San Beda University		

Senior career*
Years	Team	Apps	(Gls)
2017	Davao Aguilas	2	(0)
2017–2018	Meralco Manila	4	(0)
2018–2019	JPV Marikina	1	(1)
2019–	Mendiola 1991	27	(1)

International career^{‡}
2017	Philippines U23	1	(0)
- * Club domestic league appearances and goals as of 12:53, October 5, 2023 (UTC) ‡ National team caps and goals as of 12:53, October 5, 2023 (UTC)

Rey Franco Miguel Bautro de la Torre (born 20 November 1996) is a Filipino professional footballer who plays as a full-back or midfielder for Mendiola 1991 of the Philippines Football League.

== Youth and college career ==
De La Torre was born in Cagayan de Oro, in the province of Misamis Oriental. He played his college football for the Red Lions of San Beda University.

== Club career ==
=== First professional contract ===
He signed his first professional contract with Davao Aguilas, a newly formed club of the Philippines Football League, and was part of the team along with several other San Beda teammates due to the owner, Jefferson Cheng's proximity with the U22 national team. He played half the season before transferring to league leaders Meralco Manila, where he would end up finishing third overall.

=== Mendiola 1991 ===
After playing the 2018 season with JPV Marikina, he returned to his roots by playing football for another newly formed club, Mendiola 1991, which was a largely San Beda-based club with Red Lions alumni. In 2022, he was made 2nd captain of the club behind Jim Ashley Flores.

== International career ==
=== Philippines U23 ===
In March 2017, after graduating from San Beda, he was named as part of the Philippines' U23 team, first participating in a training camp in Bahrain. He was named in the initial lineup for the 2017 SEA Games, but was cut from the roster.

He would go on to make his first and only appearance for the U22 team in the 2018 AFC U-23 Championship Qualifiers, coming off the bench for Troy Limbo in a 2–0 loss to China.
