= Aaron Altiche =

Filipino footballer (born 1989)

Personal information
- Full name: Aaron Manacho Altiche
- Date of birth: January 3, 1989 (age 37)
- Place of birth: Aroroy, Masbate, Philippines
- Position: Winger

Team information
- Current team: Mendiola 1991
- Number: 17

College career
Years	Team	Apps	(Gls)
2005–2009	San Beda University		

Senior career*
Years	Team	Apps	(Gls)
2010–2011	Global		
2012–2013	Laos		
2013–2014	Global	6	(1)
2014–2017	Laos	16	(3)
2017–2018	JPV Marikina	5	(2)
2019–	Mendiola 1991	23	(2)
- * Club domestic league appearances and goals as of 2:37, October 11, 2023 (UTC)

Aaron Manacho Altiche (born 3 January 1989) is a Filipino professional footballer who plays as a winger for Philippines Football League club Mendiola 1991.

== College career ==
Altiche was born in Aroroy, Masbate and played college football for the Red Lions of San Beda University, winning four straight NCAA titles before graduating.

== Club career ==
=== Global ===
After graduating from San Beda, he signed with Global FC, also called Teknika FC, a club participating in the newly formed United Football League. During this period, he also tried out for the Philippine U23 and senior teams.

In 2013, he rejoined the team from Laos FC and was a key player for the club in winning the 2014 United Football League. He was also a vital player as the club played their first-ever continental campaign in the 2013 Singapore Cup.

=== LAOS ===
In 2012, he joined LAOS FC which was competing in the UFL Division 2, where he played for two seasons. In 2014, he rejoined the team again and led them as club captain for three years until the club stopped participating in the league.

=== JPV Marikina ===
Altiche signed for JPV Marikina when the club joined the Philippines Football League, and was vital for the club over two seasons. However, the club abruptly withdrew from the PFL in late 2018, leaving him without a club.

=== Mendiola 1991 ===
When a new team was formed for the 2019 season of the PFL, namely Mendiola FC, Altiche joined forces with his former coach Dan Padernal and a host of other former San Beda players such as Jim Ashley Flores and Franco de la Torre. In 2021, as Mendiola secured an AFC license, he was named vice-captain. He left the club for a short while in 2023 due to injuries, but rejoined it for the 2023 Copa Paulino Alcantara.

== International career ==
=== Philippines ===
Altiche was first called up for the Philippine National U23 Team in 2007 for the SEA Games, though the Philippines ended up not participating.

He would try out for the senior national team, the Azkals, in 2009, but didn't make the cut. In 2011, however, he was called up by Azkals coach Michael Weiß for the 2012 AFC Challenge Cup qualifiers, but didn't make an appearance for the team.
