= Nick O'Donnell (footballer) =

Footballer (born 1993)

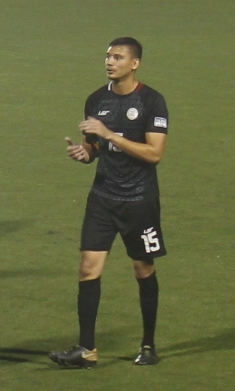
- O'Donnell in 2018

Personal information
- Full name: Nicholas Michael Ricardo O'Donnell
- Date of birth: 23 March 1993 (age 33)
- Place of birth: Toronto, Ontario, Canada
- Height: 6 ft 2 in (1.88 m)
- Position: Goalkeeper

Youth career
- ?–2013: Ateneo de Manila

Senior career*
Years	Team	Apps	(Gls)
2014–2015	Kaya	29	(0)
2016–2017	Global	4	(0)
2017–2018	Davao Aguilas	10	(0)

International career^{‡}
2015–?	Philippines U-23	1	(0)
2014–2018	Philippines	4	(0)
- * Club domestic league appearances and goals as of 01:57, 14 October 2018 (UTC) ‡ National team caps and goals as of 21:09, 4 January 2025 (UTC)

Nicholas Michael O'Donnell (born 23 March 1993) is a former professional footballer who played as a goalkeeper. Born in Canada, he represented the Philippines national team at international level.

== Club career ==
O'Donnell used to play for Ateneo Blue Booters helping them win the football tournament of UAAP Season 75 in 2013. The next year he moved to Kaya F.C. He helped Kaya win the 2015 UFL Cup.

In 2016, O'Donnell moved to Global F.C.

== International career ==
=== Philippines youth ===
On 20 March 2015, it was announced that O'Donnell was called up by the Philippines U23 national team for the 2016 AFC U-23 Championship qualification on 25 to 31 March in Thailand. He played in the Philippines last game as captain, a 3–1 defeat to Cambodia.

=== Philippines ===
O'Donnell was called up into the Philippine senior team for friendlies against Malaysia and Azerbaijan in 2014. He made his national team debut in a 3–0 win over Nepal. O'Donnell played for the Philippines again at the 2017 CTFA International Tournament in Taiwan under caretaker coach Marlon Maro who led the squad in lieu of Thomas Dooley.

O'Donnell played at the second half of the Philippines 3–2 win over Fiji as a substitute for Michael Falkesgaard at the 45th minute.
