= Milan Nikolić (footballer, born 1987) =

Serbian footballer

Personal information
- Full name: Milan Nikolić
- Date of birth: 21 June 1987 (age 39)
- Place of birth: Belgrade, SFR Yugoslavia
- Height: 1.87 m (6 ft 2 in)
- Position: Centre forward

Senior career*
Years	Team	Apps	(Gls)
2005–2007	Radnicki Jugopetrol	59	(19)
2007–2009	BSK Borča	45	(4)
2009–2010	Polonia Warsaw	19	(2)
2011–2012	Čukarički	10	(1)
2013	Nyíregyháza Spartacus	10	(0)
2014	Zemun	6	(1)
2014–2018	Moravac Orion Mrštane	3	(0)
2015–2016	Akhaa Ahli		
2016	Tarbes Pyrénées	4	(1)
- * Club domestic league appearances and goals

Milan Nikolić (Serbian Cyrillic: Милан Никoлић, born 21 June 1987) is a Serbian former professional footballer who played as a forward.
