= Kim Sung-min (footballer, born 1985) =

South Korean footballer

Kim Sung-Min
Personal information
- Full name: Kim Sung-Min
- Date of birth: 19 April 1985 (age 41)
- Place of birth: South Korea
- Height: 1.75 m (5 ft 9 in)
- Position: Forward

Youth career
- Korea University

Senior career*
Years	Team	Apps	(Gls)
2008–2009	Ulsan Hyundai	7	(1)
2010	Ulsan Hyundai Mipo	19	(7)
2011–2013	Gwangju FC		
2012–2013	→ Sangju Sangmu (army)		
2014	Chungju Hummel		
2015–2017	Cheonan City		
2017	Gimpo Citizen		
2018	Davao Aguilas		
2021–2022	Stallion Laguna		
2022–2023	Maharlika Manila		
2023–	Loyola		
- * Club domestic league appearances and goals

Kim Sung-Min (Korean: 김성민; born 19 April 1985) is a South Korean professional footballer who plays as a forward.

== Club career ==
=== Davao Aguilas ===
In January 2018, Kim joined Philippines Football League club Davao Aguilas. On 21 April, he scored his first goal for Davao in a 3–2 win over JPV Marikina. On 16 June, he scored a brace against Stallion Laguna in a 5–0 victory. Kim ended the season with eight league goals, and Davao Aguilas finished third in the league.

In the Copa Paulino Alcantara, Kim scored a brace in Davao's last group match, a 4–0 win against Stallion Laguna. On 21 October, he scored four goals in a 6–1 thrashing of JPV Marikina in the semi-final. Davao eventually lost to Kaya in the final. After the 2018 season, Davao Aguilas folded and released all its players.
