= Jim Ashley Flores =

Filipino footballer (born 1992)

Personal information
- Full name: Jim Ashley Pereña Flores
- Date of birth: September 12, 1992 (age 34)
- Place of birth: Santa Cruz, Laguna, Philippines
- Height: 1.82 m (6 ft 0 in)
- Positions: Striker; winger

Team information
- Current team: Manila Digger
- Number: 7

College career
Years	Team	Apps	(Gls)
- Rizal Technological University
2011–2015	San Beda University		

Senior career*
Years	Team	Apps	(Gls)
2015	Mendiola 1991		
2016–2017	Stallion	15	(2)
2017–2018	Loyola Meralco Sparks	4	(0)
2018	JPV Marikina		
2018–2019	Stallion Laguna		
2019–2024	Mendiola 1991	27	(13)
2024–	Manila Digger	6	(1)

Managerial career
- 2023: Philippines U17 (women)
- 2023: Philippines (women) (assistant)
- 2024–: Philippines U17 (women) (assistant)
- * Club domestic league appearances and goals as of 5:23, September 1, 2023 (UTC) ‡ National team caps and goals as of 5:23, September 1, 2023 (UTC)

Jim Ashley Pereña Flores (born 12 September 1992) is a Filipino professional footballer who plays for Philippines Football League club Manilla Digger. He is currently the assistant coach of the Philippines women's national football team, and the Philippines women's national under-17 football team.

== Youth and college career ==
Flores was born in the municipality of Santa Cruz, Laguna. For college, he first played football with Rizal Technological University before getting a scholarship and playing for the college team of San Beda University, winning four straight NCAA titles with them. At the same time, he participated with Mendiola 1991, a team closely affiliated with San Beda, in the 2015 UFL Cup.

== Club career ==
=== 2016 season - Stallion ===
After graduating from San Beda, he was picked up by UFL side Stallion, playing a big role in the club's campaign where they finished 6th. His form also led to a call-up to the Philippine National Team, the Azkals.

=== 2017 season - Meralco Manila ===
Flores signed with Loyola Meralco Sparks in 2017, recently renamed due to the club joining the Philippines Football League. A regular off the bench, his season at Meralco saw the team top the regular season table and finish 3rd overall. However, upon the season's end, Meralco abruptly withdrew from the league.

=== 2018 season - JPV and Stallion ===
Following Loyola's withdrawal, Flores joined fellow PFL side JPV Marikina. He did not make much progress at the club, however, and joined Stallion Laguna once more during the mid-season break and played in the club's run to the semifinals in the 2018 Copa Paulino Alcantara.

=== 2019 onwards - Mendiola ===
In 2019, Flores signed with Mendiola, his former team, which was debuting in the 2019 PFL season. At the end of the season, he ranked 6th in the scoring charts with 9 goals and scored 2 more to lead Mendiola to a semifinal finish in the 2019 edition of the Copa Paulino Alcantara. He was named captain of the club the following year as Mendiola looked to qualify for the AFC Cup.

== International career ==
=== Philippines U23 ===
In 2015, while playing college football for San Beda, Flores was called up to the U-23 National Team for a training camp in Australia in preparation for the 2015 edition of the SEA Games. Despite impressing, however, he did not make the final squad.

=== Philippines ===
After his performances for Stallion in the UFL, Flores was called up to the Philippine National Team for their 2018 FIFA World Cup Qualifiers against North Korea and Uzbekistan in March 2016. Later that year, he played in an unofficial friendly match against A-League side Perth Glory.

== Managerial career ==
In 2015, Flores became the liaison officer for the Philippine U17 National Team.

In 2018, he underwent an AFC "B" Coaching Certificate Course, undertaking the "A" Diploma Course 4 years later in 2022. In 2023, he was already instructor for the PFF "C" Diploma.

In 2023, he was handed his first stint as head coach for the Philippine Women's U17 team in the 2023 JENESYS Football Memorial Cup in Japan.

In August 2023, following the departure of coach Alen Stajcic from the Philippine Women's National Team, fellow Australian Mark Torcaso was brought in. Flores was part of the coaching staff, as an assistant coach alongside Siniša Cohadzić and Andrew Durante.
