= Jeffrey Christiaens =

Filipino footballer (born 1991)

Personal information
- Full name: Jeffrey Mallen Christiaens
- Date of birth: 17 May 1991 (age 35)
- Place of birth: Brussels, Belgium
- Height: 1.70 m (5 ft 7 in)
- Positions: Left back; left winger

Youth career
- –1998: GL Ruiselede
- 1998–2002: Deinze
- 2002–2011: Club Brugge

Senior career*
Years	Team	Apps	(Gls)
2011–2012	Torhout	13	(2)
2012–2014	Global	23	(7)
2014–2020	Ceres–Negros	34	(10)

International career^{‡}
	Belgium U-15	2	(0)
	Belgium U-16	2	(0)
	Belgium U-17	4	(0)
2012	Philippines U-22	5	(1)
2011–2014	Philippines U-23	5	(0)
2011–2018	Philippines	30	(0)
- * Club domestic league appearances and goals as of 11:52, 7 May 2017 (UTC) ‡ National team caps and goals as of 18:25, 22 March 2018 (UTC)

Jeffrey Mallen Christiaens (born 17 May 1991) is a former footballer who mainly played as a winger. He last played for Filipino side Ceres–Negros. Born in Belgium, he represented the Philippines at international level.

== Career ==
=== Club ===
Christiaens started his youth career at Ruiselede before moving on to Deinze and eventually Club Brugge. Towards the end of the 2010–11 season, he was released by Club Brugge and signed for Belgian Third Division side Torhout. He made his senior debut on 17 August 2011 in the 1–1 home draw against Géants Athois, coming on as a substitute in 80th minute. He made his first start and scored his first goal for the club in his second appearance in the 2–2 away draw to Royal Mouscron-Péruwelz.

On 19 November 2011, he made an appearance for Filipino side Global FC in a round of 16 match in the 2011 United Football Cup against the Philippine Army. They won 3–0 and progressed to the quarter-finals. However, there were no reports indicating that there was any deal in place which would see him play for Global FC. It would be his only appearance for the club before returning to Torhout. Upon his return, he would make a further four appearances and finishing the 2011–12 season with 13 appearances.

In the summer of 2012, Christiaens moved to the Philippines and played again for Global. He later moved to Ceres in June 2014, which later became Ceres-Negros F.C. when its joined the Philippines Football League in 2017. Christiaens announced his departure from the club on July 5, 2020

=== International ===
In August 2011, the team manager of the Philippines national team traveled to Europe to scout for potential talent. Three players that were tapped were Belgian–Filipinos which included Christiaens. They traveled to the Philippines in early September to try out for the Philippines national under-23 team that will be competing at the 2011 Southeast Asian Games. Christiaens in particular was able to impress sufficiently that he was also named in the senior national team's 20-man squad for the 2011 Long Teng Cup.

== Honours ==
=== Club ===
Global FC

- UFL Division 1: Runner-up 2013

Ceres-Negros FC

- AFC Cup 2017: Asean Zonal Champion
- Philippines Football League: Champion 2017, 2018, 2019
- Copa Paulino Alcantara: Champion 2019

=== National team ===
- Philippine Peace Cup: 2012, 2013

=== Individual ===
- Philippine Peace Cup Best Defender: 2012
