= Jason de Jong =

Filipino footballer (born 1990)

Personal information
- Full name: Jason Nicolas Maria Dantes de Jong
- Date of birth: 28 February 1990 (age 36)
- Place of birth: Breda, Netherlands
- Position: Defensive midfielder

Youth career
- 2000–2004: Gloria UC
- 2004–2009: NAC Breda

Senior career*
Years	Team	Apps	(Gls)
2009–2010	Turnhout	19	(0)
2010–2011	Veendam	0	(0)
2011	Persiba Balikpapan	3	(0)
2011–2012	Dordrecht	0	(0)
2012–2013	Stallion FC	4	(0)
2013	→ Global FC (loan)	8	(0)
2013–2015	Global FC	16	(5)
2015	Bornem	0	(0)
2015	Global FC		
2015–2016	Loyola Meralco Sparks		
2017	Ceres–Negros	4	(1)
2017–2018	Davao Aguilas		
2020	NWS Spirit FC		

International career^{‡}
2011–2013	Philippines U23	6	(0)
2008–2014	Philippines	48	(0)
2009	Philippines (futsal)	4	(3)
- * Club domestic league appearances and goals as of 18:00, 6 May 2017 (UTC) ‡ National team caps and goals as of 19:04, 30 October 2014 (UTC)

Jason Nicolas Maria Dantes de Jong (born 28 February 1990) is a retired footballer. Born in the Netherlands, he has played for the Philippines national team.

De Jong has played professionally in the Netherlands, Belgium, Indonesia and the Philippines. Formerly a winger, he was later converted to a defensive midfielder and has been likened to his namesake Nigel de Jong.

== Club career ==
=== Youth ===
Born in Breda, Netherlands, De Jong began his career with Gloria UC and moved to NAC Breda in 2004 after he was scouted.

=== Turnhout ===
In August 2009, De Jong moved abroad and signed a one-year deal for newly promoted Belgian Second Division club Turnhout. On 16 August 2009, he made his first-team debut in the 1–0 defeat against Royal Antwerp in the Belgian Cup. Three days later, he made his league debut in the 1–1 draw against Tienen.

=== Veendam ===
After his stint in Belgium, he returned to the Netherlands to find a new club. On 28 June 2010, it was reported that De Jong, along with number of other new players, would be joining Veendam at the start of their pre-season training as trialists. He would also feature regularly in their friendly matches and by mid July, he was one of the players that was in contention to earn a contract. He eventually signed a one-year deal with the option of a one-year extension. However, he would miss the start of the season due to his transfer papers not being ready.

On 27 August 2010, De Jong was involved with the team for the first time as he was part of the matchday squad against Zwolle. He would be an unused substitute as Veendam lost 2–0. It would be one of five times he would be a part of Veendam's matchday squad until the winter break, all as an unused substitute. Having failed to secure a spot in the first team, the club announced on 4 January 2011 that they and De Jong have jointly decided to terminate his contract.

=== Persiba Balikpapan ===
On 17 February 2011, it was reported that De Jong began trials with Indonesia Super League club Sriwijaya. The club didn't have much time to assess him due to the transfer deadline for foreign players on 23 February but the club management moved it forward for themselves to the 21st. By 20 February, he was released from his trials as he wasn't up to the standard the club was looking for. However, a news report in the Philippines said that De Jong revealed on his Facebook page that he was offered a contract by Sriwijaya but didn't sign due to disagreements on the terms of the deal.

De Jong was able to get another trial with another Indonesia Super League club, Persiba Balikpapan, after his agent Jules Onana found out they were looking to sign foreign players. He started training with the team on 21 February and after two days, he was able to impress the club and Onana successfully negotiated a deal. The deal would keep him at the club for the remainder of the 2010–11 Indonesia Super League season and cost Persiba Rp 706 million ($80,000).

He made his debut on 13 March 2011, playing the full 90 minutes in the 5–1 defeat to Sriwijaya. It was a debut where he was criticized by his coach for having an unsatisfactory performance and said De Jong needed more time to adapt. In their following fixture, De Jong played 58 minutes as Persiba Balikpapan drew 2–2 with PSPS Pekanbaru. In his third successive game, Balikpapan got a goalless draw with Arema FC while De Jong only managed to play the first 28 minutes before being replaced. It would prove to be his last match with the club as he was sacked in early May 2011 due to breach of contract, citing indiscipline and failure to consistently attend training.

=== Dordrecht ===
In June 2011, De Jong was due to join RBC Roosendaal in the Eerste Divisie. The club attempted to avoid bankruptcy by contracting players with an amateur contract to be able to play in lower divisions. However, De Jong's move wouldn't materialize as the club was declared bankrupt after failure to pay its outstanding debts.

On 10 August 2011, it was reported that De Jong began training with Dordrecht, another Eerste Divisie club. He featured in a friendly match against ADO Den Haag in which he encountered fellow Philippine international Paul Mulders. The match ended 2–0 to Den Haag. He was eventually accepted to the youth reserve squad at the start of the 2011–12 season. On 19 September 2011, De Jong made his first appearance in a match against the youth team of the Eredivisie club VVV-Venlo. De Jong gained a yellow card following a tackle to an opponent. The match ended 6–2 in favor of Dordrecht.

=== Stallion ===
In March 2012, De Jong was offered to play in the Philippines for Stallion in the United Football League. However, he was able to get a three-day trial with Scottish First Division side Ayr United. It was initially reported that he was set to sign for the club but Ayr United manager Brian Reid revealed that de Jong had not signed for Ayr due to financial constraints at the club. In August 2012, it was announced that De Jong eventually signed with the UFL side for the 2012–13 season.

He made his first league appearance for the club in a 4–0 win against Pasargad.

In March 2013, at the middle season of the 2013 United Football League, de Jong joins Global on loan until the end of season.

=== Global ===
After having loan spell, De Jong finally joins Global permanently.

=== Bornem ===
On 11 January 2015, De Jong signs for 3rd division club KSV Bornem in a 1-year deal.

=== Global ===
De Jong returned to Global after a short spell with K.S.V. Bornem.

=== Loyola Meralco Sparks ===
On 21 October 2015, De Jong signs for the Loyola Meralco Sparks.

=== Ceres-Negros ===
In January 2017, Ceres-Negros announced that they have signed in de Jong, along with few other players, to play for the club.

=== NWS Spirit ===
On 30 October 2019 Australian club, North West Sydney Spirit FC, confirmed that De Jong would join the club from 2020.

== International career ==
De Jong was born to a Filipina mother and a Dutch father, making him eligible to represent either the Philippines or the Netherlands. He was initially invited to play for the Netherlands U-19 team but declined the offer to be able to play for the Philippines instead. In September 2008 it was announced that he will be playing for the Philippines in the AFF Suzuki Cup qualifiers in Cambodia. He made his debut as a substitute in the opening match against Timor-Leste and went on to feature as a starter in the remaining fixtures. However, they failed to advance to the final tournament after finishing tied for second in the qualifiers, being level on points and goal difference but had an inferior goals scored record.

De Jong was selected as vice-captain for the national under-23 team in time for the 2011 Southeast Asian Games, alongside captain Matthew Hartmann. He made his first appearance in the 3–1 loss against Vietnam in the opening match. After Hartmann quit the team on 10 November, De Jong was named captain with Manny Ott as vice-captain.

De Jong has also represented the Philippines in futsal. He featured for the Philippines during the 2009 AFF Futsal Championship and scored three goals; a brace in the 10–2 victory over Timor Leste, and once in the third place play-off defeat to Indonesia.

In October 2014, De Jong announced his retirement from the national team to focus more on his family.

== Honours ==
=== Club ===
Stallion

- UFL Cup: 2012
