= Davao del Norte Sports Complex =

Sports complex in the Philippines

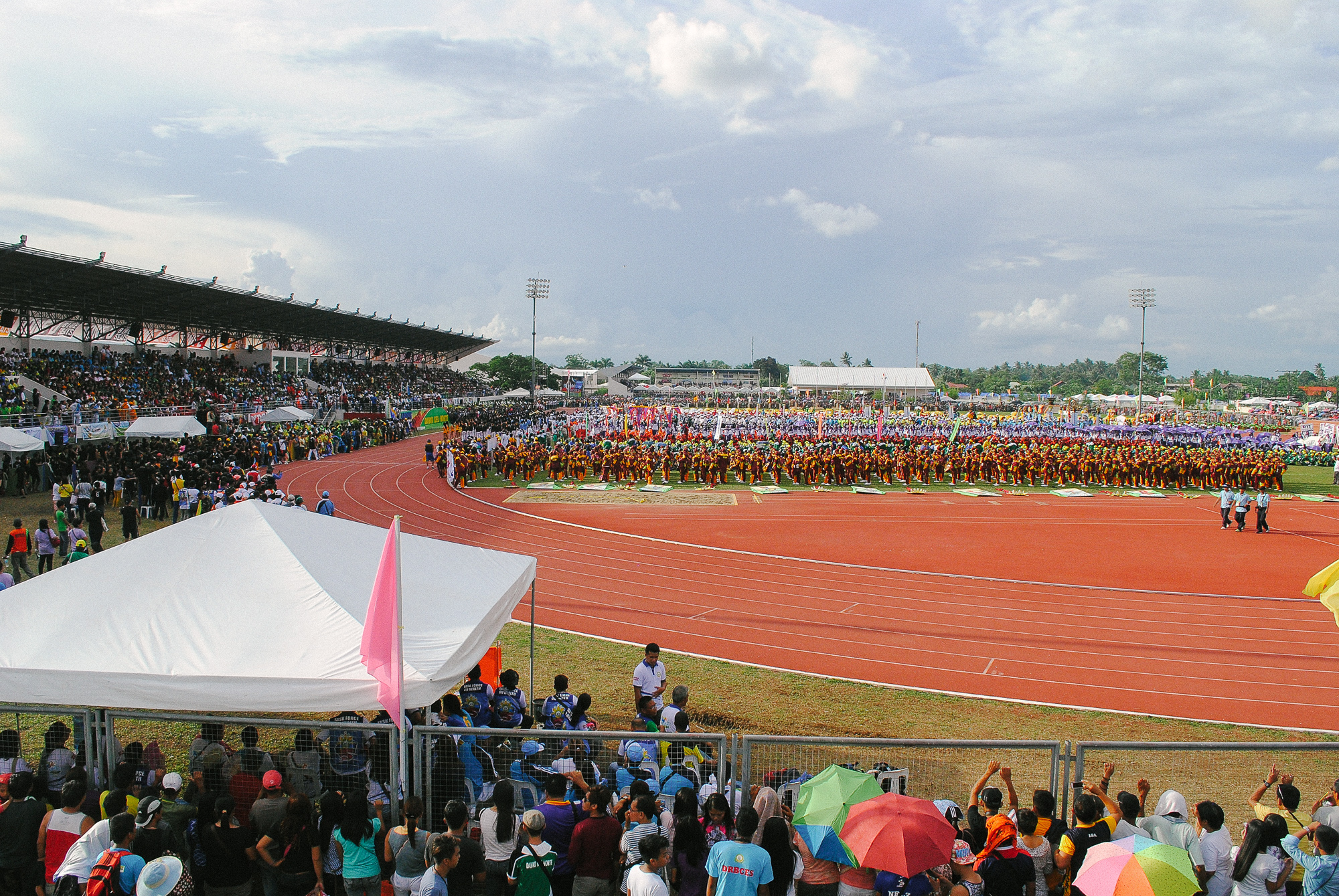
- DNSTC during 2015 Palarong Pambansa
- Interactive map of Davao del Norte Sports Complex
- Full name: Davao del Norte Sports and Tourism Complex
- Location: Tagum, Davao del Norte, Philippines
- Coordinates: 7°27′18″N 125°47′01″E
- Owner: Provincial Government of Davao del Norte
- Operator: Provincial Government of Davao del Norte
- Main venue: Main Stadium; Capacity: 3000
- Facilities: Aquatic Center, RDR Gymnasium, Tennis Courts, Secondary football field

Construction
- Groundbreaking: 11 November 2011
- Opened: 12 December 2012
- Cost: ₱243 million

Tenant
- Davao Aguilas (2017–present)

The Davao del Norte Sports and Tourism Complex (DNSTC) is a sports complex in Tagum, Davao del Norte, Philippines, and is the largest sports complex in the Davao region. It was built on the area of the former Davao Sports Complex, torn down by fire in 2003.

The sports complex was the main hub for 2015 Palarong Pambansa events, including the opening and closing ceremonies. The stadium is the home of Davao Aguilas F.C. since their founding in 2017.

== History ==
A previous sports facility called the Davao Sports Complex stood in the lot where the new DNSTC was built; the old sports complex consisted of two wooden grandstands and a partially covered gymnasium, with a gravel athletics track, a football field, and a gravel baseball court. The lot was then used as a motocross track.

In 2007, plans were being made to reconstruct the sports complex using better materials with an avant-garde design, with the aim of building the most modern sports facility throughout the Philippines. The initial design was drawn up and presented in 2008. The initial cost for the reconstruction project amounted to PHP 350 million. However, the 2008 financial crisis caused the prices for the project materials to exceed the budget. This prompted the provincial government to use the budget for other services.

In 2011, Davao del Norte Governor Rodolfo P. Del Rosario revived the project as part of the province's bid to host the 2015 Palarong Pambansa, but this time it followed a more conventional design. Project cost amounted to PHP 243 million. Construction began on 11 November 2011 and was completed on the target date of 12 December 2012.

== Facilities ==
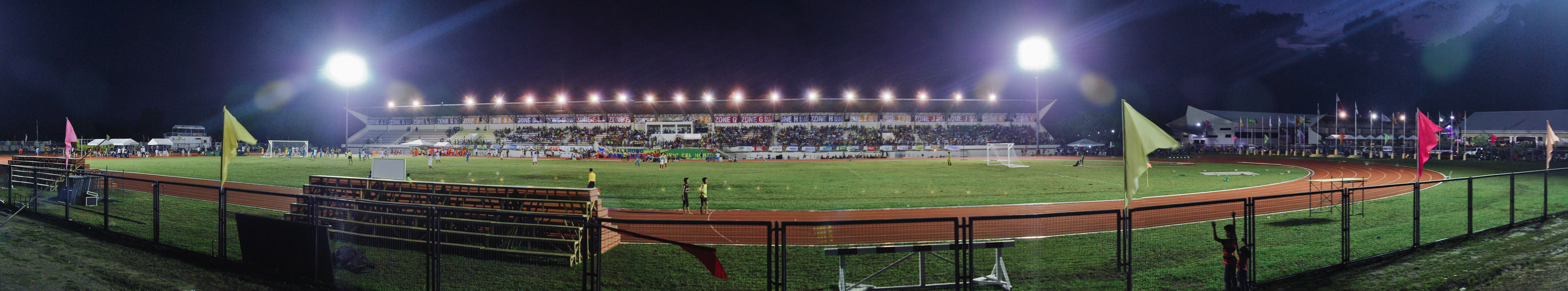
The main grandstand, track oval, and football field

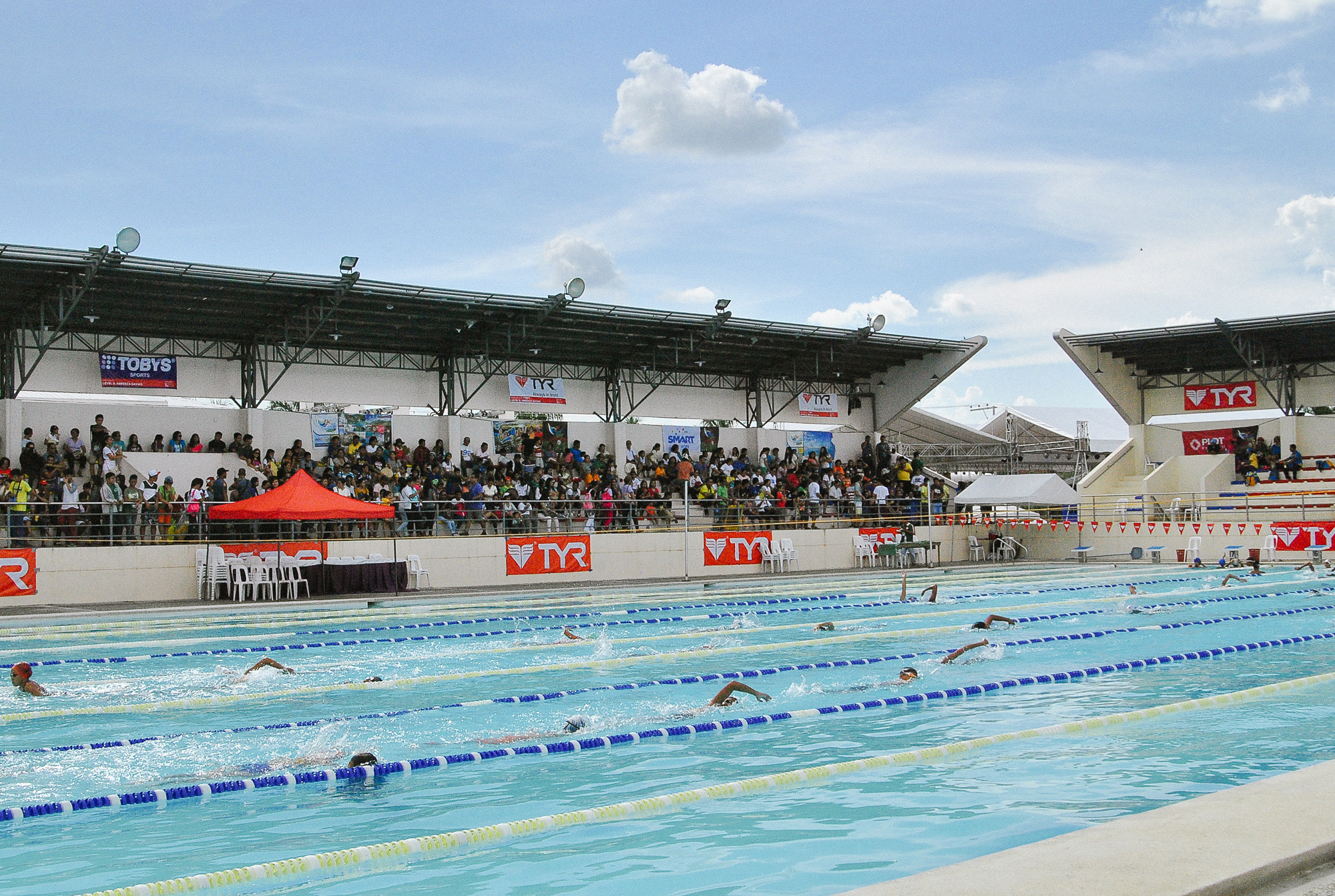
DNSTC Aquatic Center

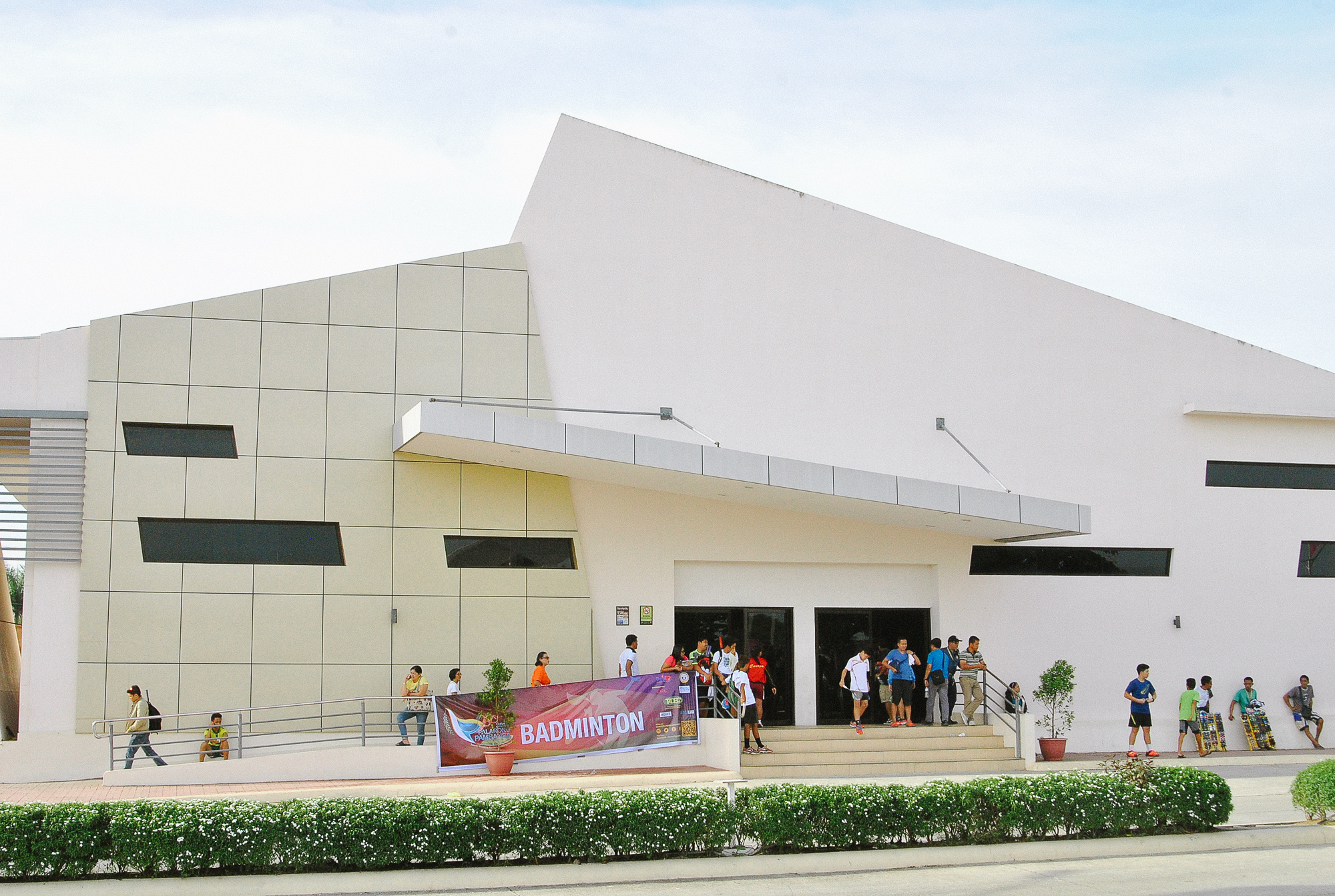
RDR Gymnasium

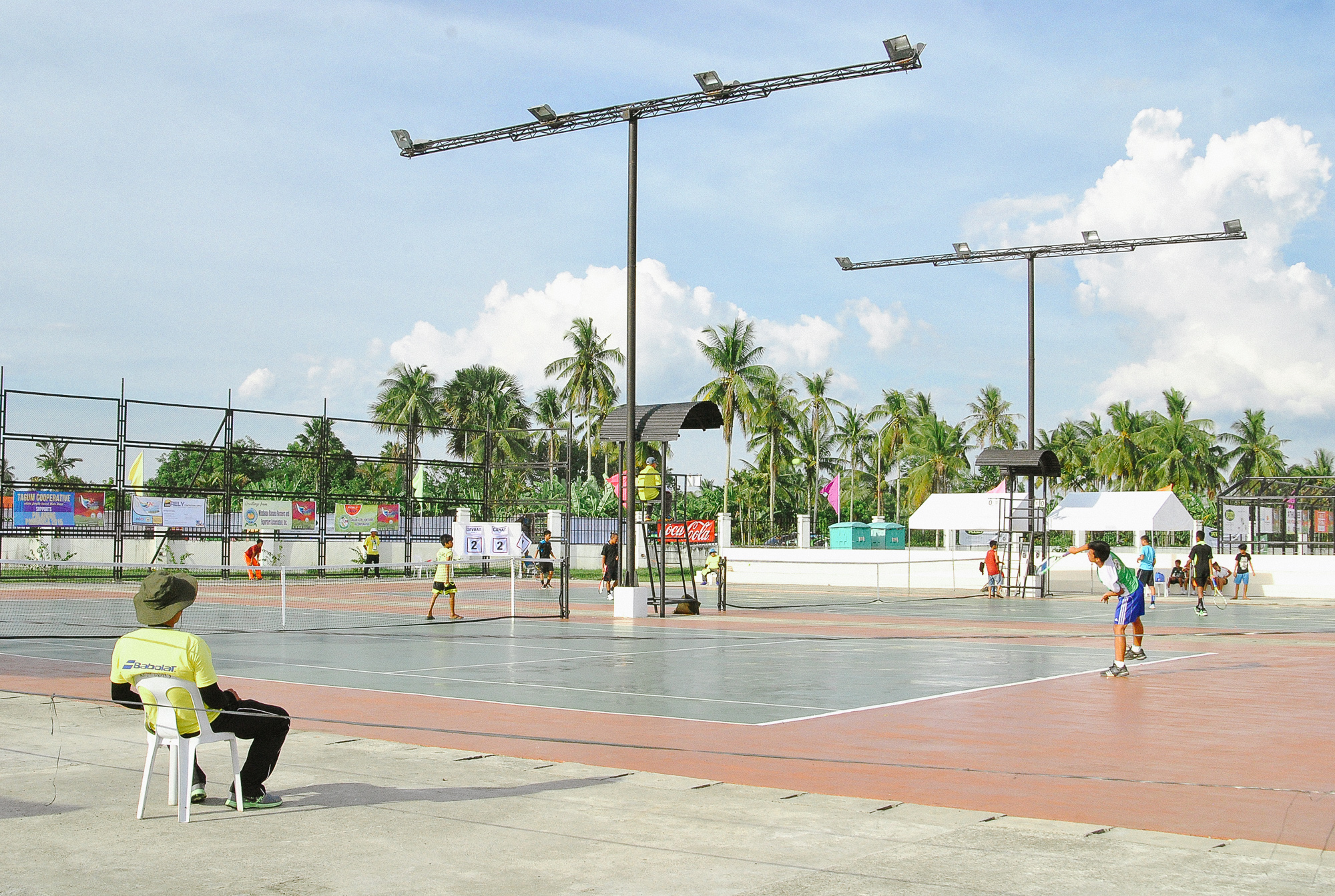
DNSTC Tennis Courts

The complex has several sporting facilities including a 3,000-capacity main grand stand, a rubberized eight-track athletics oval, an Aquatic Center featuring a ten-lane Olympic-size swimming pool (50 meters) with a warm up pool (12 meters), two lawn tennis courts, an air-conditioned multi-purpose Rodolfo P. Del Rosario Gymnasium that can be used for indoor games, two football fields, and a club house.

The complex also has a lighting system for night events, consisting of four light towers with high-intensity bulbs and additional LED lights on the main grandstand.

The main grandstand has several multi-purpose rooms that can be used for other indoor games or storage space. Offices for the Provincial Sports Office and a sub-office for the Provincial General Services are located in the main grandstand and Aquatic Center grandstand, respectively.

The clubhouse features a canteen operated by the provincial government employees', an open-air dining area, and an air-conditioned conference room.

=== Tourism Village ===
The DavNor Pasalubong Shop and Tourism Village are located behind the RDR Gymnasium and Aquatic Center. A covered area with lights and sound fixtures is available for night events such as concerts. The area also has spaces where tenants can set up their stalls and sell their products.

== Uses ==
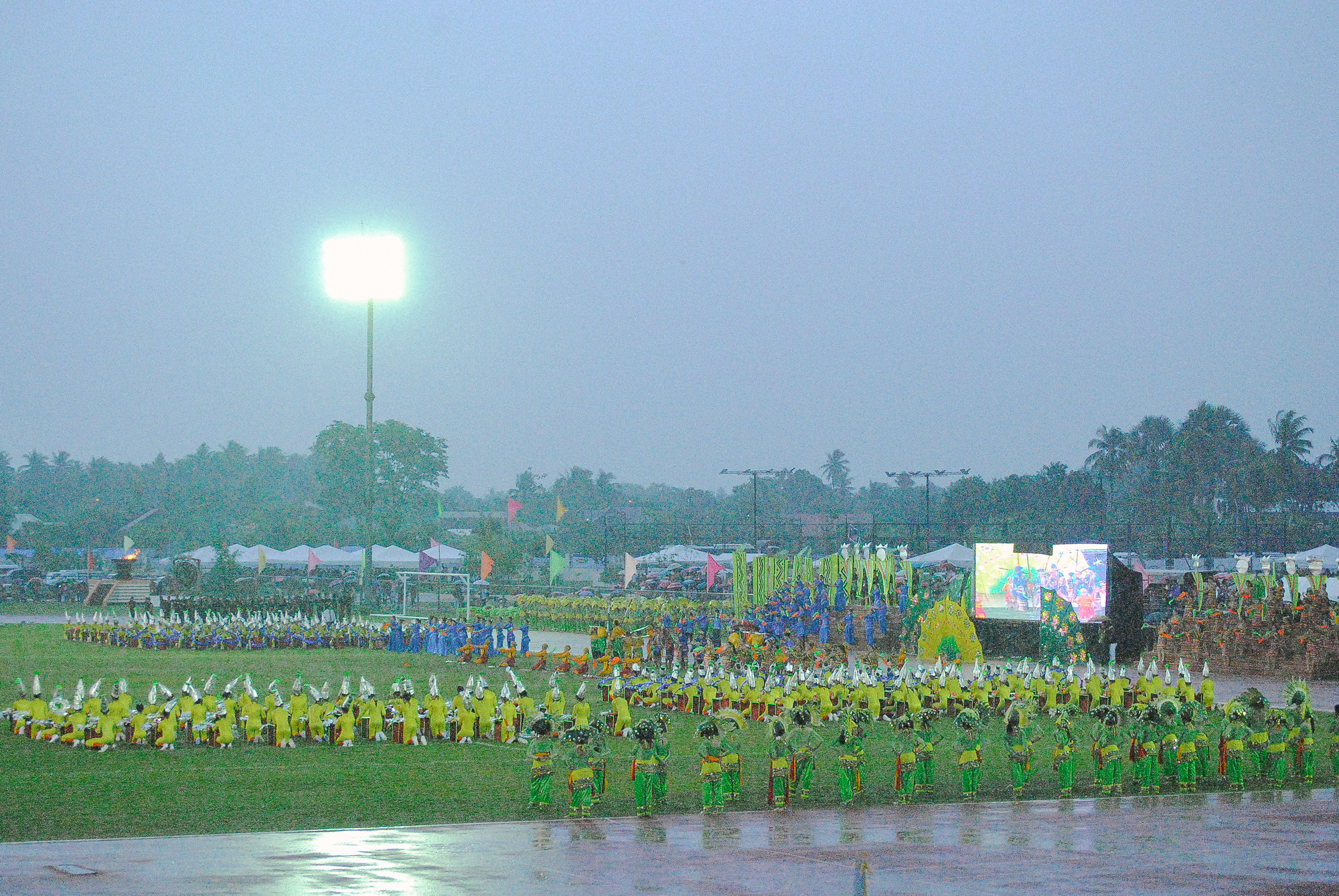
Opening ceremony of the 2015 Palarong Pambansa

The sports complex operates as a multi-use sports venue, capable of hosting regional, national sports events such as the Palarong Pambansa and the Private Schools Athletic Association (PRISAA) National Competition, and international events such as the Southeast Asian Games or the Asian Games. The Tourism Village is used for all tourism-related activities by the Provincial Government.
