= Blake Powell =

Australian soccer player

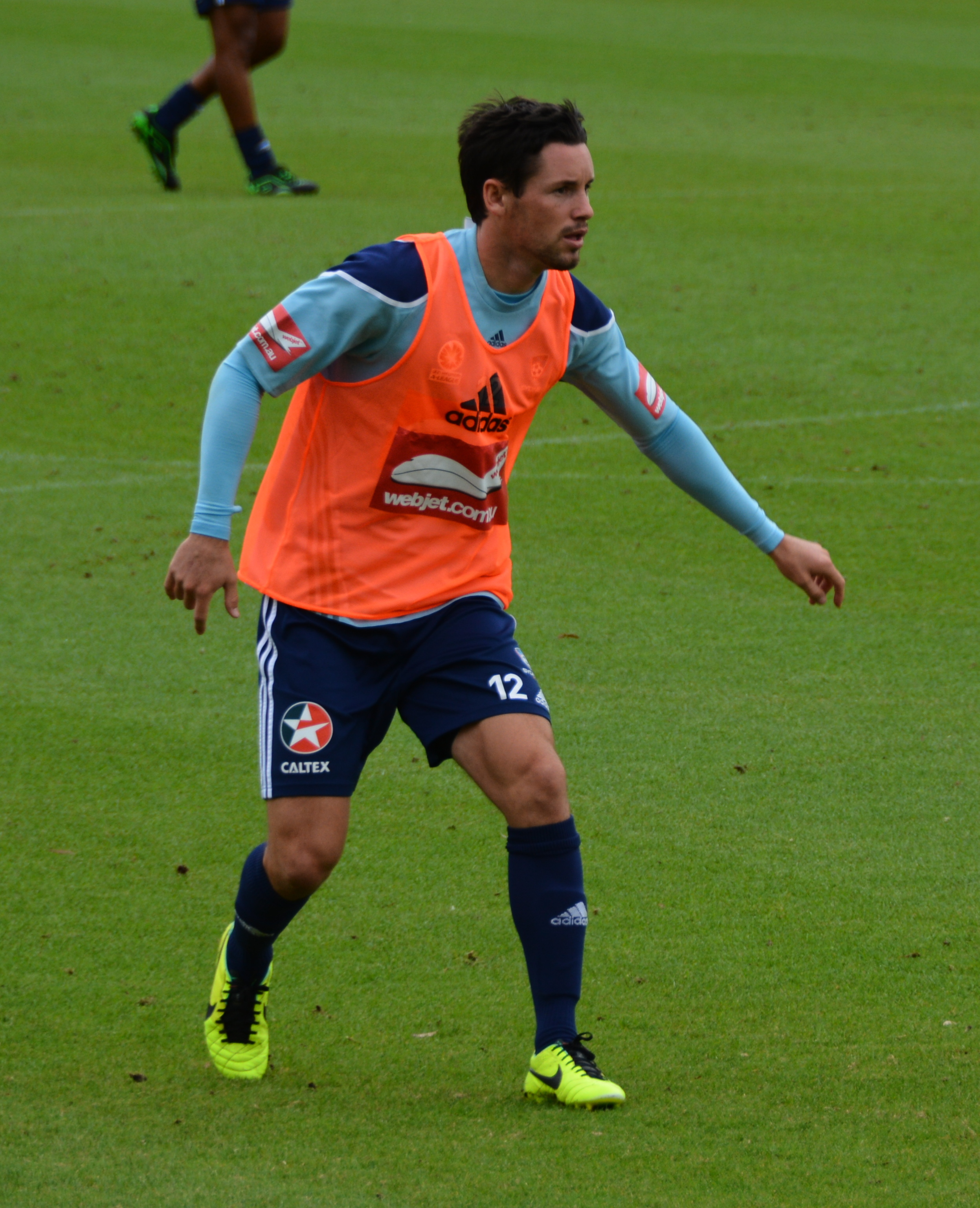
- Powell training with Sydney FC in 2014

Personal information
- Full name: Blake Powell
- Date of birth: 18 April 1991 (age 35)
- Place of birth: Sydney, Australia
- Height: 1.76 m (5 ft 9 in)
- Positions: Striker; attacking midfielder

Team information
- Current team: APIA Leichhardt
- Number: 10

Youth career
- 2010–2012: Sydney FC

Senior career*
Years	Team	Apps	(Gls)
2008–2010	Sutherland Sharks	27	(7)
2011	Bonnyrigg White Eagles	14	(4)
2012	Sutherland Sharks	8	(2)
2012–2014	Sydney FC	18	(3)
2014–2015	APIA Leichhardt	31	(28)
2015–2016	Wellington Phoenix	23	(8)
2015–2016	Wellington Phoenix Reserves	1	(1)
2016–2018	Central Coast Mariners	36	(5)
2018–2019	Ceres-Negros		
2020	Sutherland Sharks	3	(1)
2021–	APIA Leichhardt	14	(4)
- * Club domestic league appearances and goals as of 9 November 2021

Blake Powell (born 18 April 1991) is an Australian football (soccer) player who plays as a striker for APIA Leichhardt in the National Premier Leagues NSW.

== Career ==
=== Sydney FC ===
A member of Sydney FC National Youth League side over the 2010/11 and 2011/12 season as well as part of the Sydney FC Asian Champions League squad in 2011, Powell was rewarded with an A-League contract prior to the 2012/13 season. He made his debut for Sydney FC on 13 October 2012 against Newcastle Jets; he scored his first goal on his debut in a 3–2 home loss.

=== Wellington Phoenix ===
On 17 July 2015, Powell joined Wellington Phoenix.

On 14 February 2016, whilst playing against the Western Sydney Wanderers, Powell scored four goals, including a perfect hat-trick, in a single game in the A-League, the first Phoenix player to do so in the A-League.

On 5 July 2016, Wellington Phoenix released Powell from his contract for personal reasons, allowing him to return to Sydney and his family.

=== Central Coast Mariners ===
In July 2016, after scoring a goal while trialling with the Central Coast Mariners, he signed a two-year deal. On 18 April 2018 Central Coast Mariners announced they wouldn't renew Powell's contract.

=== Ceres–Negros ===
On 18 July 2018 Powell moved to Ceres–Negros F.C. in the Philippines Football League in the middle of the 2018 season.
