= Fitch Arboleda =

Filipino footballer (born 1993)

Personal information
- Full name: Fitch Johnson Daviz Barace Arboleda
- Date of birth: January 4, 1993 (age 33)
- Place of birth: Romblon, Philippines
- Height: 1.68 m (5 ft 6 in)
- Position: Midfielder

Team information
- Current team: Kaya–Iloilo
- Number: 22

College career
Years	Team	Apps	(Gls)
2009–2013	University of the East		

Senior career*
Years	Team	Apps	(Gls)
2012	Mendiola		
2012–2021	Stallion Laguna	71	(22)
2021–	Kaya–Iloilo	21	(1)

International career^{‡}
2011	Philippines U19	4	(3)
2014–	Philippines U23	3	(1)
2016–	Philippines	6	(0)
- * Club domestic league appearances and goals as of 09:20, 17 October 2016 (UTC) ‡ National team caps and goals as of 14:11, 6 April 2022 (UTC)

Fitch Johnson Daviz Barace Arboleda (born 4 January 1993) is a Filipino footballer who plays as a midfielder for Philippines Football League (PFL) club Kaya–Iloilo and the Philippines national team. He is the current head coach for PFF Women's Cup side Beach Hut.

== International career ==
Arboleda scored a hat-trick against Cambodia, although the Philippines lost 5–3. In the U22 AFC qualifiers he scored against Cambodia again in a 3–1 loss.

Arboleda also represented the Philippines at u-23 level at the 2015 SEA Games.

Arboleda came in as a substitute Misagh Bahadoran in a friendly match against the Kyrgyzstan on September 6, 2016.

== International goals ==
No.	Date	Venue	Opponent	Score	Result	Competition
1.	31 March 2015	Rajamangala Stadium, Bangkok, Thailand	Cambodia	1–3	1–3	2016 AFC U-23 Championship qualification

== Career statistics ==
=== Club ===
As of 7 August 2022.

Club	Season	League			Cup		Continental		Total	
Club	Season	Division	Apps	Goals	Apps	Goals	Apps	Goals	Apps	Goals
Stallion Laguna	2017	PFL	25	6	—		—		25	6
Stallion Laguna	2018	PFL	23	7	4	2	—		27	9
Stallion Laguna	2019	PFL	19	9	1	1	—		20	10
Stallion Laguna	2020	PFL	4	0	—		—		4	0
Kaya–Iloilo	2021	PFL	—		2	0	4	0	6	0
Kaya–Iloilo	2022—23	PFL	1	0	5	0	2	0	8	0
Career total			72	22	12	3	6	0	90	25
