= Phil Younghusband =

Filipino footballer (born 1987)

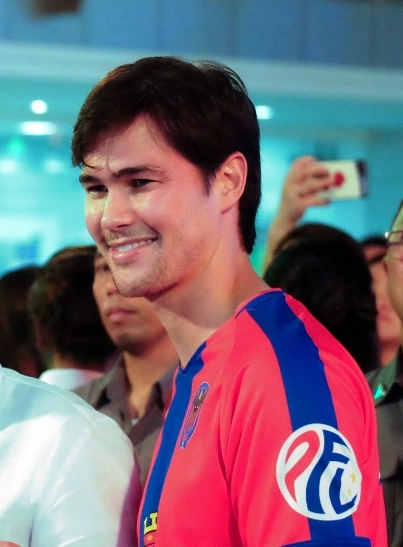
- Younghusband with Davao Aguilas in 2017

Personal information
- Full name: Philip James Younghusband
- Date of birth: 4 August 1987 (age 39)
- Place of birth: Ashford, Surrey, England
- Positions: Striker; midfielder

Youth career
- 1997–2004: Chelsea

Senior career*
Years	Team	Apps	(Gls)
2005–2008	Chelsea	0	(0)
2007–2008	→ Esbjerg fB (loan)	0	(0)
2009–2010	San Beda FC	39	(14)
2011–2017	Meralco Sparks / Manila	61	(69)
2017–2018	Davao Aguilas	31	(16)

International career
2007	Philippines U21	3	(2)
2005	Philippines U23	3	(2)
2006–2019	Philippines	108	(52)
Medal record
Men's football
Representing Philippines
AFC Challenge Cup
Silver medal – second place	2014 Maldives
Bronze medal – third place	2012 Nepal
- * Club domestic league appearances and goals

Philip James Younghusband (born 4 August 1987) is a former professional footballer who played mostly as a striker and sometimes as a midfielder.

Younghusband is best known for his performances with the Philippines national team, playing from 2006 to 2019. He served as the captain of the national team from 2014 to 2019 and is the Philippines' most capped player and all-time top goalscorer. He helped the Philippines reach the semi-finals of the 2010, 2012, 2014, and 2018 AFF Championships as well as participating in the 2019 AFC Asian Cup, the national team's first ever appearance in the tournament.

Born in Surrey, England, to an English father and Filipino mother, Younghusband joined the youth academy of Chelsea. He turned professional in 2005 with the Chelsea reserve team, and spent time on loan with Danish club Esbjerg fB. He moved to the Philippines in 2009, initially playing for San Beda before joining Loyola Meralco Sparks (later Meralco Manila) in 2011. Younghusband spent the majority of his professional career with Loyola Meralco Sparks, winning the United Football League Cup (UFL Cup) in 2013 and the PFF National Men's Club Championship in the 2014–15 season. A prolific goalscorer, he won the United Football League Golden Boot in 2012 as well as three consecutive UFL Cup Golden Boots from 2011 to 2013 and the UFL Cup Golden Ball in 2013. In 2017, he moved to Davao Aguilas where they finished as runners-up of the 2018 Copa Paulino Alcantara.

Younghusband's older brother, James, is also a footballer. The brothers have been teammates for both club and country.

== Early years ==
Philip James Younghusband was born in Ashford, Surrey, England, the son of Englishman Philip Younghusband Sr. and Filipina Susan Placer. His brother James Younghusband is also a footballer, playing as a midfielder.

== Club career ==
=== Chelsea ===
Younghusband turned professional in March 2005, having been at Chelsea since the age of nine. Younghusband was the youth team's top scorer in the 2003–04 season and made his first reserve start in November 2004. In the 2004–05 he was the youth team's top scorer. In the 2005–06 season, Younghusband made 21 appearances for the Chelsea reserve team, including 18 starts, and scored five goals. He also made one appearance as a substitute for the Chelsea youth team.

=== Loan to Esbjerg ===
On 30 August 2007, Younghusband signed a contract with Danish top-league club Esbjerg, going on loan with the Danes for the rest of the 2007–08 season but he returned to Chelsea during the January transfer window. During his time playing in the Chelsea reserves team, he scored 9 goals in 41 apps for two seasons. In the summer of 2008, his contract with Chelsea ended and he moved to the Philippines.

=== San Beda ===
On 15 April 2011, it was reported that Younghusband and his brother had announced that they would join San Beda for the 2011 National Club Championships under former national coach Aris Caslib. "It has been a long since we have been considered professional football players and we are very happy to have that opportunity again, especially in the Philippines."

=== Loyola Meralco Sparks ===
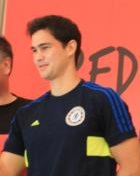
Younghusband in 2013

On 19 August 2011, it was reported that Younghusband and his brother would be joining Loyola Meralco Sparks on three-year deals after the national club championship was over.

On 15 October 2011, Younghusband made his debut for Loyola in the 2011 UFL Cup and fired a tournament-high seven goals in a 15–1 demolition of newcomer Team Socceroo FC.

At the 2011 UFL Cup final, Loyola lost against the Philippine Air Force 2–0, although he won the Golden Boot Award with 25 goals in his 7 games.

Younghusband made his league debut in a 3–2 win against Green Archers United against whom he scored a brace. Younghusband then went on to score the opening goal against Stallion FC but Loyola succumbed to a 4–1 defeat and Younghusband himself was sent off in the 79th minute. Younghusband missed the match against Global FC but scored the second goal against Kaya in a 2–0 victory. On 19 February, Younghusband scored his first league hat-trick plus two more goals in a 14–0 thrashing of Philippine Navy. After the United Football League resumed after the AFC Challenge Cup, Younghusband scored a goal in a 5–0 win over Manila Nomads. He then scored two goals against Philippine Air Force in a match which appeared to be heading to a 3–1 win to Loyola after 90 minutes, but Loyola gave away two goals in the last minute of added time and the match ended 3–3. Younghusband scored a goal in another 3–2 win over Green Archers United. He then continued his goalscoring form by scoring another hat-trick against Stallion and one against Kaya and afterwards scoring five goals in a 10–1 win over Philippine Navy. Loyola, however, went winless in their last three matches and lost out on the title race to Global with whom they drew with 1–1 on the last day of the season. Younghusband scored 23 league goals and 49 goals overall for Loyola in his first season.

In the 2012 Singapore Cup, Younghusband scored the opening goal in a 3–1 victory over Burmese outfit Kanbawza which gave Loyola an advantage for the second leg.

Younghusband was still with the club when it joined the inaugural season of the Philippines Football League in 2017 and renamed itself as F.C. Meralco Manila. After playing for the club for about six years, it was announced in July 2017 that Younghusband and his brother James were to be released by Meralco to join the Davao Aguilas in the then-upcoming transfer window. Meralco Manila attempted to have the Younghusbands agree to a contract renewal but they opted to move to the other club.

=== Davao Aguilas ===
Younghusband along with his brother James officially signed up to play for the Davao Aguilas on 2 August 2017. After Davao decided to dissolve its senior team in late 2018, Younghusband was reportedly in negotiations with Indonesian club PSIS Semarang in January 2019.

== International career ==
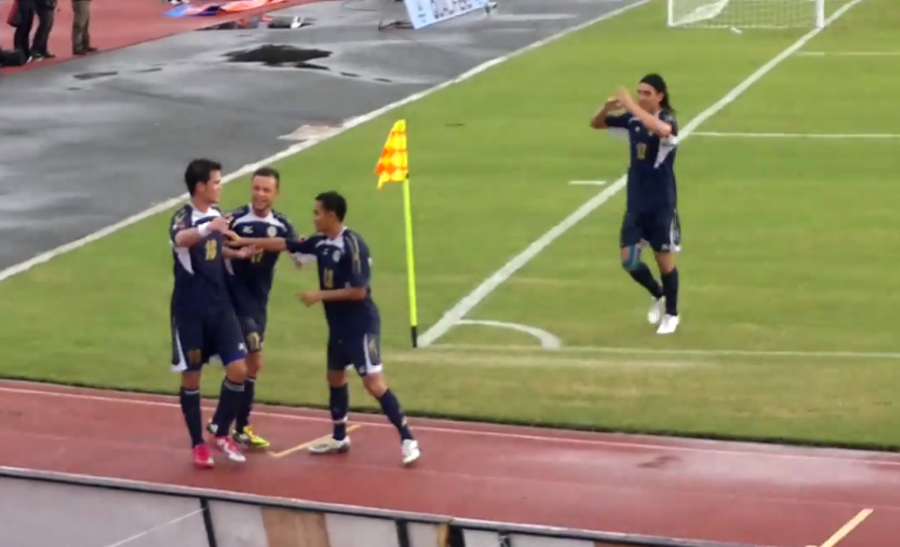
Younghusband (leftmost) celebrates with teammates after scoring a goal for the Philippines national team in 2011

Early in 2005, the Philippine Football Federation was alerted to Younghusband's eligibility by an anonymous gamer who allegedly found out about his lineage via playing Football Manager. He and his older brother, James, were eventually called up to the Southeast Asian nation's football squad, amidst much fanfare.

He played for the Philippines Under-23 national squad in the 2005 Southeast Asian Games. Younghusband scored two goals in the Philippines 4–2 loss to Malaysia. He was part of the seniors Philippine national team. Younghusband participated in the ASEAN Football Championship and scored six goals in four appearances and ended up top scorer in the qualifiers.

During the 2012 AFC Challenge Cup Phil scored two goals against 2008 champion India in a 2–0 win, making it the first win by the Philippines against India ever. Younghusband scored again in a match against former champions Tajikistan that ended 2–1 to the Philippines, enabling the country to reach the semi-finals for the first time. The Philippines were matched against 2010 runners-up Turkmenistan in the semi-finals. Younghusband opened the scoring early on, but Turkmenistan eventually struck back twice, winning the match 2–1. Because of this, the Philippines were relegated to a battle for third place against Palestine. The match eventually ended in a 4–3 win for them with two goals from Phil Younghusband. He eventually won the golden boot award after scoring six goals in the whole tournament. The third-place finish marked the best achievement for the Philippines since the years of the Far Eastern Games.

In a World Cup qualifier match against Bahrain held on 11 June 2015, Younghusband played in the midfield position.

Younghusband scored his 50th goal through a penalty kick in the Philippines' 2–1 win over Tajikistan in their last 2019 AFC Asian Cup qualifier match on 27 March 2018 joining the list of footballers who have scored 50 international goals. The win led to the Philippines' qualification for its first AFC Asian Cup in 2019. Younghusband played in all three group stage matches of the Philippines' in the 2019 AFC Asian Cup but came in as a substitute in all matches.

== Retirement ==
On 18 November 2019, Younghusband announced his retirement from football through his Instagram account.

== Personal life ==
Phil Younghusband has been married to Margaret Hall since July 2019. They got engaged in December 2017, with Younghusband proposing for them to get married on Christmas Day. The two held their wedding in England. Hall is a Filipino-Scottish model. They have a son, born on 12 June 2020.

== Honours ==
=== Club ===
Loyola Meralco Sparks

- PFF National Men's Club Championship: 2014–15
- United Football League Cup: 2013; runner-up: 2011

Davao Aguilas

- Copa Paulino Alcantara runner-up: 2018

=== International ===
Philippines

- AFC Challenge Cup runner-up: 2014; third place: 2012
- Long Teng Cup runner-up: 2011; third place: 2010
- Philippine Peace Cup: 2013; runner-up: 2014
- CTFA International Tournament runner-up: 2017

=== Individual awards ===
- Philippine Sportswriters Association footballer of the year (Mr. Football award): 2011
- United Football League Golden Boot: 2012
- United Football League Cup Golden Ball: 2013
- United Football League Cup Golden Boot: 2011, 2012, 2013
- AFC Challenge Cup: 2012 Team of the tournament

== See also ==
- List of top international men's football goalscorers by country
- List of men's footballers with 100 or more international caps
- List of men's footballers with 50 or more international goals
