= Aguilas–UMak F.C. =

Filipino association football club based in Tagum, Davao del Norte

Aguilas–UMak
- Full name: Aguilas–UMak Football Club
- Nickname: Aguilas (The Eagles)
- Short name: AUM
- Founded: March 26, 2017; 9 years ago
- Ground: University of Makati Stadium
- Capacity: 3,295
- Owner: Jefferson Cheng
- Head coach: Frank Muescan
- League: Philippines Football League
- 2025–26: Philippines Football League, 5th of 10
Home colours	Away colours

Aguilas–UMak Football Club is a Filipino professional football club based in the city of Makati, Metro Manila. The team currently plays in the Philippines Football League (PFL), the top-flight league of football in the Philippines. It was formerly known as Davao Aguilas Football Club.

Upon its entry to the PFL until 2025, the club was the sole Mindanao-based club in the league. The Aguilas initially left the PFL and was disbanded after the conclusion of the 2018 season, following disagreements regarding the supposed successor league to the PFL, the short-lived Philippine Premier League. However, the club resumed operations again in July 2020, focusing on youth football development until its eventual return to the PFL in the 2024 season.

== History ==
=== Establishment and entry to the Philippines Football League ===
The group behind the Aguilas have expressed their interest to play in the Philippines Football League and submitted their letter of intent before the December 31, 2016 deadline. They were given until the end of January 2017 to complete all licensing requirements.

On February 19, 2017, it was reported that Davao Aguilas F.C. was joining the Philippines Football League as the sole representative from Mindanao. They conducted tryouts at the Agro pitch in Davao City on February 19, 2017. Though the team's composition is already being organized as early as February 2017, Davao Aguilas lists its foundation date as March 26, 2017. In March 2017, the club participated in the Stallion preseason cup, where Ed Walohan scored their first goal in competitive play.

=== 2017 season ===
The club hosted an official launch ceremony on March 26, 2017, at the Davao del Norte Sports Complex, their home venue.

By June 2017, the club owners secured a sponsorship deal with the San Miguel Corporation and appended "San Miguel" to their official name. On September 18, with the club cut adrift at 7th place, manager Gary Phillips was sacked and replaced by Marlon Maro. The team finished 7th in the inaugural PFL season.

=== 2018 season ===
In the 2018 season, the club signed more national and foreign players to bolster the squad. Maro resigned in the middle of the season and was replaced by Melchor Anzures. In September 2018, the club signed a partnership agreement with the Japan-based club Shonan Bellmare, competing in the J.League. The partnership was formed to bolster cooperation between the two clubs, which includes the development of players and coaches, player scouting, academy and marketing. The Davao Aguilas also briefly changed their name to "Davao Aguilas Bellmare Football Club", to signify their partnership.

Davao Aguilas featured in the final of the inaugural Copa Paulino Alcantara where they lost to Kaya-Iloilo due to a solitary goal.

=== Withdrawal from the Philippines Football League ===
It was reported on December 14, 2018, that the club has withdrawn from the PFL. Jefferson Cheng iterated continued support for infrastructure and grassroots development in Davao. Cheng has also cited the decision to hire Bernie Sumayao to manage the PFL despite his volunteering to take over the management of the league. However the league's inaugural season in 2017 was cut short and the PFL was reestablished once again.

Davao Aguilas were disbanded but Cheng remained involved in local football, sponsoring the youth tournaments through his company Speed Regalo.

=== Return to action ===
In July 2020, Davao Aguilas announced the resumption of operations its youth department. They would join the 7's Football League

Reinforced by players from the University of Makati, Davao Aguilas would take part in the 2023 Copa Paulino Alcantara. From 2024, Davao Aguilas return to Philippines Football League after confirmed on 5 February 2024.

In 2024, Davao Aguilas return to Philippines Football League after confirming its participation on 5 February 2024.

=== Name change ===
In June 2025, Davao Aguilas F.C. changed its name to Aguilas–UMak F.C. including a new logo for the team.

== Crest and colors ==
The colors of the team Davao Aguilas are blue which represents "loyalty and brilliance" and red which represents "passion and valor". The red stripes symbolize 5 attributes of the club's players (strength, speed, agility and mentality), while the blue stripes symbolize the concepts of fair play, respect, perseverance and integrity. The colors of the club were selected as reportedly as a show of patriotism and derived after the Philippine flag. The bird's head in the crest is that of a Philippine eagle.

== Affiliated clubs ==
- (Japan) Shonan Bellmare (2022–present)
- (Indonesia) Nusantara Lampung (2024–present)

== Players ==
As of 10 September 2026

Note: Flags indicate national team as defined under FIFA eligibility rules; some limited exceptions apply. Players may hold more than one non-FIFA nationality.

No.	Pos.	Nation	Player
1	GK	PHI	Enrico Mangaoang
2	DF	PHI	Kenneth Soriano
3	DF	KOR	An Sang-jin
4	DF	PHI	Richard Talaroc
5	DF	AUS	Jalil Regague
6	MF	PHI	Daniel Gadia
7	FW	PHI	Lucas del Rosario
9	FW	BEN	Destiny Gandaho
10	MF	PHI	Arnel Amita (captain)
11	FW	JPN	Ryuta Iwai
13	FW	PHI	Kart Talaroc
14	DF	PHI	Johnrey Daohog
15	DF	PHI	Reynald Villareal

No.	Pos.	Nation	Player
17	MF	KOR	Ji Hong-hwan
18	FW	KOR	Choi Ju-hyuk
19	MF	KOR	Lee Seung-jun
20	DF	KOR	Park Jun-yeong
22	FW	KOR	Oh Beom-seok
23	DF	MAS	Dirain Eswaran
25	DF	PHI	Jayvee Kallukaran
29	GK	KOR	Kim Yu-sung
33	GK	KOR	Kang Tae-yang
36	FW	PHI	Darius Dinawanao
37	DF	GHA	Amidu Yakubu
42	MF	GHA	Edmond Appiah
99	DF	PHI	Pete Forrosuelo

== Personnel ==
Position	Name
Head coach	(Philippines) Frank Muescan
Assistant coaches	(Philippines) Marlon Pinero (Philippines) Melchor Anzures (Philippines) Ramonito Carreon (Philippines) Ronoel Garfin
Physiotherapists	(Philippines) John Morado (Philippines) Janus Earl Dacumos (Philippines) Remigio Nigel Ilustre
Masseur	(Philippines) Alexander Gamat
Kitman	(Philippines) Arnold Robiso

== Head coaches ==
Coach	Nat.	Tenure
Melchor Anzures (Note: Anzures did not coach the team in a single league match, although he was reportedly the head coach of the Davao Aguilas during its February 2017 try-outs.)	Philippines	February 2017
Gary Phillips	Australia	February – September 2017
Marlon Maro	Philippines	September 2017 – 29 May 2018
Melchor Anzures	Philippines	29 May 2018 – 31 December 2018
Aber Ruzgal	Philippines	2020 – 2025
Jörg Steinebrunner	Germany	July 28, 2025 – October 10, 2025
Frank Muescan	Philippines	October 17, 2025 – January 16, 2026
Oliver Colina	Philippines	January 16, 2026 – Present

== Honors ==
=== Cups ===
- Copa Paulino Alcantara
  - Runners-up: 2018, 2023

== Records ==
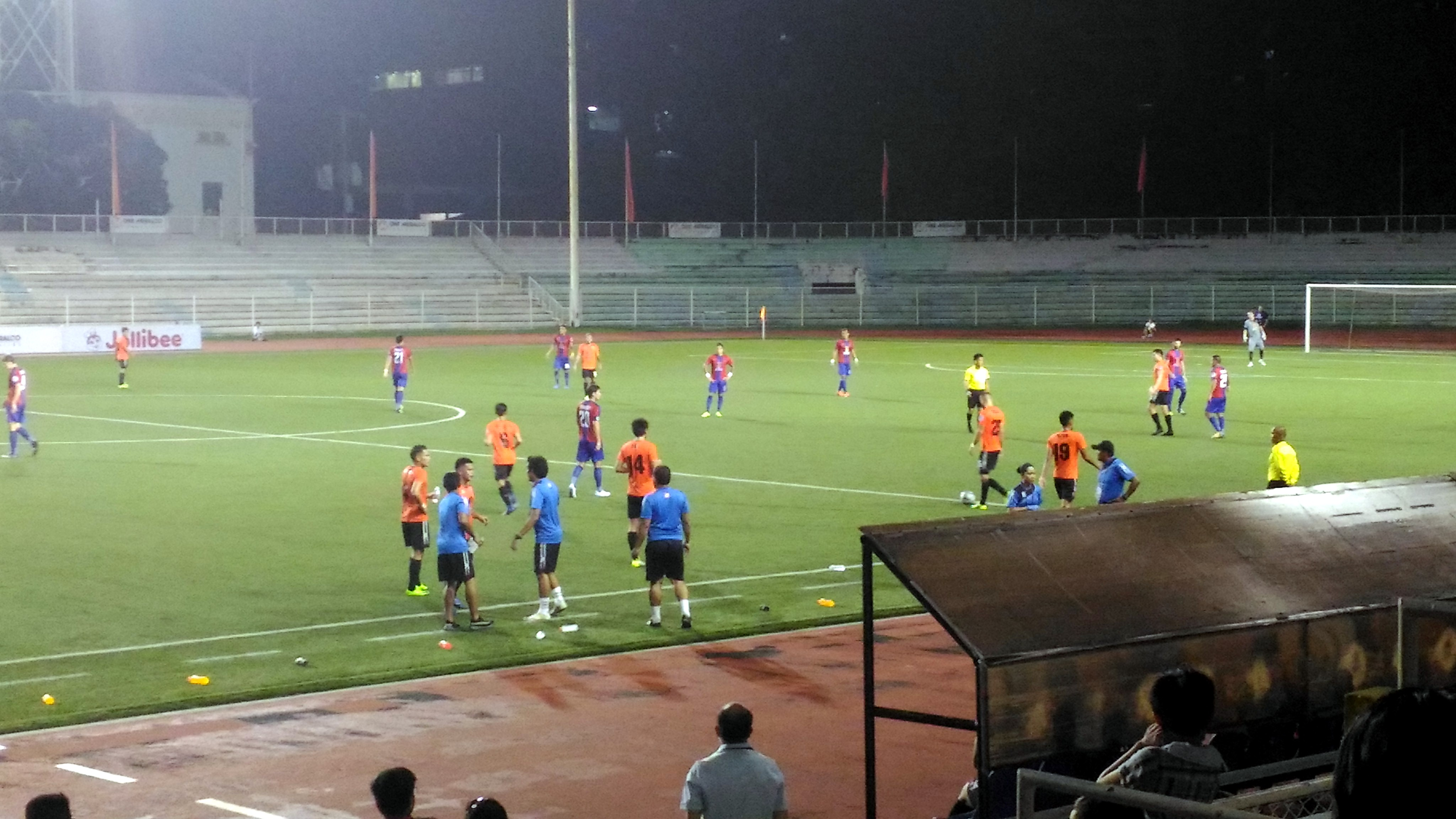
Davao Aguilas vs Meralco Manila, September 23, 2017

=== Season by season record ===
Season	Division	Season statistics									Copa Paulino Alcantara	Top goalscorer (Note: Only includes goals scored in the league.)	
Season	Division	P	W	D	L	GF	GA	GD	Pts	Pos	Copa Paulino Alcantara	Name	Goals
2017	PFL	28	4	10	14	35	56	-21	22	7th	—	(Australia) Harry Sawyer	10
2018	PFL	25	11	6	8	52	39	+13	39	**3rd**	**2nd**	(Philippines) Phil Younghusband	12
2019	—	—	—	—	—	—	—	—	—	—	—	—	—
2022	—	—	—	—	—	—	—	—	—	—	—	—	—
2021	—	—	—	—	—	—	—	—	—	—	—	—	—
2022	—	—	—	—	—	—	—	—	—	—	—	—	—
2023	—	—	—	—	—	—	—	—	—	—	**2nd**	(Philippines) Yannick Tuason	5 (Note: Since Davao Aguilas only participated in the Copa Paulino Alcantara this season, the total goals scored are from the 2023 Copa Paulino Alcantara.)
2024	PFL	14	10	2	2	39	6	+33	32	4th	—	(Senegal) Ibrahima Ndour	5
2024–25	PFL	18	7	4	7	24	16	+8	25	6th	—	(Brazil) **Gabriel Costa**	8
2025–26	PFL	25	12	4	9	51	34	+17	40	6th	—		

Champions	Runners-up	Third place	Ongoing

- GS – Group stage
- R16 – Round of 16
- QF – Quarter finals
- SF – Semi finals
- **Bold** denotes player currently plays for club
