= 2017 Davao Aguilas F.C. season =

Davao Aguilas
2017 season
- Chairman: Jefferson Cheng
- Head coach: Marlon Maro
- Stadium: Davao del Norte Sports Complex
- PFL: 7th (Regular Season)
Home colours	Away colours	Third colours
- All statistics correct as of 21 November 2017.

The 2017 season was Davao Aguilas' 1st season in the top flight of Philippine football. The club is the sole Mindanao-based club in the inaugural season of the PFL.

== Competitions ==
=== Philippines Football League ===
Pos	Team	Pld	W	D	L	GF	GA	GD	Pts	Qualification or relegation
1	Meralco Manila	28	17	7	4	43	33	+10	58	Qualification for finals series
2	Ceres–Negros (C)	28	17	6	5	76	27	+49	57	Qualification for finals series
3	Kaya FC–Makati	28	14	5	9	52	35	+17	47	Qualification for finals series
4	Global Cebu	28	13	8	7	47	37	+10	47	Qualification for finals series
5	Stallion Laguna	28	9	8	11	39	49	−10	35	
6	JPV Marikina	28	9	6	13	42	48	−6	33	
7	Davao Aguilas	28	4	10	14	35	56	−21	22	
8	Ilocos United	28	1	6	21	24	73	−49	9	

Source: Philippines Football League
Rules for classification: 1) Points; 2) Goal Difference; 3) Goals Scored
(C) Champions

==== Regular season ====
7 May 2017 1	Ilocos United	1–1	Davao Aguilas	Bantay^{a}
16:00 UTC+8	Kanayama 78'		De Bruycker 50'	Stadium: Quirino Stadium

14 May 2017 2	Davao Aguilas	2–3	JPV Marikina	Tagum
16:00 UTC+8	De Bruycker 8', 90+3' (pen.)	Report	Odawara 2'; Cañedo 20'; Uesato 84'	Stadium: Davao del Norte Sports Complex; Attendance: 4,300

20 May 2017 3	Kaya FC–Makati	2–0	Davao Aguilas	Makati
16:00 UTC+8	Mintah 16'; Reed 42' (pen.)			Stadium: University of Makati Stadium

3 June 2017 4	Meralco Manila	2–0	Davao Aguilas	Manila
19:00 UTC+8	Dizon 6'; J. Younghusband 70'			Stadium: Rizal Memorial Stadium

18 June 2017 5	Stallion Laguna	0–0	Davao Aguilas	Biñan
16:00 UTC+8				Stadium: Biñan Football Stadium

21 June 2017 6	Davao Aguilas	2–2	Meralco Manila	Tagum
16:00 UTC+8	Krstic 21'; De Bruycker 71'	Report	Minniecon 2'; P. Younghusband 12'	Stadium: Davao del Norte Sports Complex

25 June 2017 7	Davao Aguilas	0–0	Ilocos United	Tagum
16:00 UTC+8				Stadium: Davao del Norte Sports Complex

28 June 2017 8	Davao Aguilas	1–2	Global Cebu	Tagum
16:00 UTC+8				Stadium: Davao del Norte Sports Complex

9 July 2017 9	Davao Aguilas	1–5	Kaya FC–Makati	Tagum
16:00 UTC+8	Grubjesic 49'; Cordova (red card) 55'		Bedic 20', 76'; Osei 57'; Giganto 87'; Daniels 90+3'	Stadium: Davao del Norte Sports Complex

15 July 2017 10	Global Cebu	0–0	Davao Aguilas	Cebu City
19:00 UTC+8				Stadium: Cebu City Sports Complex

22 July 2017 11	Ceres–Negros	2–0	Davao Aguilas	Bacolod
16:00 UTC+8	Porteria 27'; Schröck 57'			Stadium: Panaad Stadium

29 July 2017 12	Davao Aguilas	2–3	Meralco Manila	Tagum
16:00 UTC+8	Sawyer 33'; Hartmann 42'		Nikolic 41', 66'; J. Younghusband 64'	Stadium: Davao del Norte Sports Complex

9 September 2017 13	Davao Aguilas	2–2	Global Cebu	Tagum
16:00 UTC+8	P. Younghusband 41' (pen.); De Jong 64'		Salenga 13'; Villanueva 43'	Stadium: Davao del Norte Sports Complex

13 September 2017 14	Global Cebu	3–1	Davao Aguilas	Cebu City
16:00 UTC+8				Stadium: Cebu City Sports Complex

16 September 2017 15	Davao Aguilas	1–3	Ceres–Negros	Manila^{c}
19:00 UTC+8	Sawyer 90+1'	Report	Rodriguez 19'; Marañón 51'; Christiaens 87'	Stadium: Rizal Memorial Stadium

20 September 2017 16	Davao Aguilas	1–1	Ceres–Negros	Tagum
16:00 UTC+8	J. Younghusband 27'		Rodriguez 73'	Stadium: Davao del Norte Sports Complex

23 September 2017 17	Meralco Manila	2–0	Davao Aguilas	Manila
19:00 UTC+8	Minniecon 52'; Morallo 83'	Report		Stadium: Rizal Memorial Stadium

30 September 2017 18	Stallion Laguna	2–2	Davao Aguilas	Biñan
16:00 UTC+8	Arboleda 36', 69'	Report	J. Younghusband 66'; P. Younghusband 90+3' (pen.)	Stadium: Biñan Football Stadium

15 October 2017 19	Davao Aguilas	2–0	Ilocos United	Tagum
16:00 UTC+8	Sawyer 25'; J. Younghusband 64'	Report		Stadium: Davao del Norte Sports Complex; Attendance: 4,500

18 October 2017 20	Ilocos United	2–4	Davao Aguilas	Bantay^{a}
16:00 UTC+8	K. Uzoka 45+1'; Beaton 61'		Sawyer 8', 44', 57'; P. Younghusband 90' (pen.)	Stadium: Quirino Stadium

22 October 2017 21	JPV Marikina	0–3; Awarded	Davao Aguilas	Manila^{b}
16:00 UTC+8				Stadium: Rizal Memorial Stadium

25 October 2017 22	Davao Aguilas	0–2	Kaya FC–Makati	Tagum
16:00 UTC+8			Mintah 45'; Tanton 62'	Stadium: Davao del Norte Sports Complex

29 October 2017 23	Davao Aguilas	2–2	Stallion Laguna	Manila^{c}
16:00 UTC+8	McDonald 56'; Sawyer 82'		Tuason 2'; Arboleda 17'	Stadium: Rizal Memorial Stadium

2 November 2017 24	Ceres–Negros	5–1	Davao Aguilas	Bacolod
19:00 UTC+8	Rodríguez 1', 33', 39'; Reichelt 14'; Marañón 30'		Guirado 27'	Stadium: Panaad Stadium

5 November 2017 25	Davao Aguilas	0–2	Stallion Laguna	Tagum
16:00 UTC+8			Mascazzini 65'; Arboleda 90+3'	Stadium: Davao del Norte Sports Complex

18 November 2017 26	Kaya FC–Makati	1–3	Davao Aguilas	Makati
16:00 UTC+8	Osei 58'	Report	Guirado 26', 74'; Harry Sawyer 65'	Stadium: University of Makati Stadium

21 November 2017 27	JPV Marikina	6–3	Davao Aguilas	Manila^{b}
16:00 UTC+8	Uesato 6', 39', 57'; Mahmoud 47'; Odawara 49'; Otomo 90+3'		Guirado 52'; P. Younghusband 76'; Sawyer 90+4'	Stadium: Rizal Memorial Stadium

25 November 2017 28	Davao Aguilas	1–1	JPV Marikina	Tagum
16:00 UTC+8	McDonald 57'		Odawara 12'	Stadium: Davao del Norte Sports Complex

Note:

- a The home stadium of the club is located in Bantay, Ilocos Sur, a nearby town of Vigan. For administrative and marketing purposes, the home city of Ilocos United is designated as "Vigan"
- b Because of the ongoing works in the Marikina Sports Complex, the team will play its first few league games at the Biñan Football Stadium and Rizal Memorial Stadium and will have to groundshare with Stallion Laguna and Meralco Manila, respectively.
- c Because of the unavailability of the Davao del Norte Sports Complex, the match was played instead in Rizal Memorial Stadium, Manila.

== Players ==
=== First-team squad ===
As of 20 September 2017

Note: Flags indicate national team as defined under FIFA eligibility rules; some limited exceptions apply. Players may hold more than one non-FIFA nationality.

No.	Pos.	Nation	Player
1	GK	SRB	Marko Trkulja
2	GK	PHI	Kim Versales (on loan from Green Archers United)
3	DF	PHI	Jason Cordova
5	DF	PNG	Brad McDonald
6	MF	PHI	Nate Burkey
7	MF	PHI	Alexis Cabistante
8	MF	PHI	Jason de Jong
9	FW	AUS	Harry Sawyer
10	MF	PHI	Dylan de Bruycker
11	FW	PHI	Richard Talaroc Jr.
12	MF	PHI	Mujer Sumail
13	MF	PHI	Amir Amaikurut
14	FW	PHI	Omar Khan
15	MF	PHI	James Hall
16	DF	PHI	Junell Bautista

No.	Pos.	Nation	Player
17	FW	PHI	Jaime Cheng
18	MF	GER	Andreas Esswein
19	MF	PHI	Khalil Jakiri
20	FW	PHI	Phil Younghusband
21	MF	PHI	James Younghusband
22	MF	PHI	Jordan Jarvis
23	MF	PHI	Raymart Cubon
24	DF	PHI	Simone Rota
25	MF	PHI	Matthew Hartmann
26	MF	PHI	Jorrel Aristorenas
28	FW	PHI	Ángel Guirado
29	MF	PHI	Jay-ar Bucayan
30	GK	PHI	Nick O'Donnell
31	DF	SRB	Bojan Mališić
—	MF	PHI	Ryan Hall

=== Foreign players ===
In the Philippines Football League, there can be at least four non-Filipino nationals in a team as long as they are registered. Foreign players who have acquired permanent residency can be registered as locals.

- (Serbia) Marko Trkulja
- (Serbia) Miloš Krstić
- (Papua New Guinea) Brad McDonald
- (Australia) Harry Sawyer
