= 2017 JPV Marikina F.C. season =

JPV Marikina
2017 season
- Head coach: Dan Padernal
- Stadium: Marikina Sports Complex
- PFL: 6th (Regular Season)
| Home colours | Away colours |
- All statistics correct as of 28 November 2017.

The 2017 season is JPV Marikina's 1st season in the top flight of Philippines football.

== Competitions ==
=== Philippines Football League ===
| Pos | Team | Pld | W | D | L | GF | GA | GD | Pts | Qualification or relegation |
|---|---|---|---|---|---|---|---|---|---|---|
| 1 | Meralco Manila | 28 | 17 | 7 | 4 | 43 | 33 | +10 | 58 | Qualification for finals series |
| 2 | Ceres–Negros (C) | 28 | 17 | 6 | 5 | 76 | 27 | +49 | 57 | Qualification for finals series |
| 3 | Kaya FC–Makati | 28 | 14 | 5 | 9 | 52 | 35 | +17 | 47 | Qualification for finals series |
| 4 | Global Cebu | 28 | 13 | 8 | 7 | 47 | 37 | +10 | 47 | Qualification for finals series |
| 5 | Stallion Laguna | 28 | 9 | 8 | 11 | 39 | 49 | −10 | 35 | |
| 6 | JPV Marikina | 28 | 9 | 6 | 13 | 42 | 48 | −6 | 33 | |
| 7 | Davao Aguilas | 28 | 4 | 10 | 14 | 35 | 56 | −21 | 22 | |
| 8 | Ilocos United | 28 | 1 | 6 | 21 | 24 | 73 | −49 | 9 | |

Source: Philippines Football League
Rules for classification: 1) Points; 2) Goal Difference; 3) Goals Scored
(C) Champions

==== Regular season ====
| 7 May 2017 1 | JPV Marikina | 1–2 | Global Cebu | Biñan^{a} |
| 16:00 UTC+8 | Odawara 55' | | Aguinaldo 58'; Mulders 61' | Stadium: Biñan Football Stadium |

| 14 May 2017 2 | Davao Aguilas | 2–3 | JPV Marikina | Tagum |
| 16:00 UTC+8 | | | | Stadium: Davao del Norte Sports Complex |

| 20 May 2017 3 | JPV Marikina | 0–1 | Meralco Manila | Biñan^{a} |
| 16:00 UTC+8 | | | | Stadium: Biñan Football Stadium |

| 31 May 2017 4 | Stallion Laguna | 0–4 | JPV Marikina | Biñan |
| 16:00 UTC+8 | | | | Stadium: Biñan Football Stadium |

| 4 June 2017 5 | JPV Marikina | 2–0 | Ilocos United | Manila^{a} |
| 16:00 UTC+8 | | | | Stadium: Rizal Memorial Stadium |

| 17 June 2017 6 | JPV Marikina | 2–1 | Ceres–Negros | Manila^{a} |
| 16:00 UTC+8 | | | | Stadium: Rizal Memorial Stadium |

| 21 June 2017 7 | Ilocos United | 1–2 | JPV Marikina | Bantay^{b} |
| 19:00 UTC+8 | | | | Stadium: Quirino Stadium |

| 25 June 2017 8 | Global Cebu | 1–2 | JPV Marikina | Manila^{c} |
| 19:00 UTC+8 | | | | Stadium: Rizal Memorial Stadium |

| 8 July 2017 9 | Meralco Manila | 1–0 | JPV Marikina | Manila |
| 19:00 UTC+8 | | | | Stadium: Rizal Memorial Stadium |

| 16 July 2017 10 | Kaya FC–Makati | 2–0 | JPV Marikina | Makati |
| 16:00 UTC+8 | | | | Stadium: University of Makati Stadium |

| 19 July 2017 11 | JPV Marikina | 0–2 | Stallion Laguna | Manila^{a} |
| 16:00 UTC+8 | | | | Stadium: Rizal Memorial Stadium |

| 23 July 2017 12 | JPV Marikina | 1–2 | Stallion Laguna | Manila^{a} |
| 16:00 UTC+8 | | | | Stadium: Rizal Memorial Stadium |

| 9 August 2017 13 | Ilocos United | 2–2 | JPV Marikina | Bantay^{b} |
| 16:00 UTC+8 | | | | Stadium: Quirino Stadium |

| 13 August 2017 14 | JPV Marikina | 5–2 | Global Cebu | Manila^{a} |
| 16:00 UTC+8 | Uesato 2', 13', 18', 35'; Odawara 34' | | Sanchez 63'; Villanueva 82' | Stadium: Rizal Memorial Stadium |

| 16 August 2017 15 | Kaya FC–Makati | 2–2 | JPV Marikina | Makati |
| 16:00 UTC+8 | | | | Stadium: University of Makati Stadium |

| 23 August 2017 16 | JPV Marikina | 1–1 | Meralco Manila | Manila^{a} |
| 16:00 UTC+8 | | | | Stadium: Rizal Memorial Stadium |

| 6 September 2017 17 | JPV Marikina | 0–3 | Kaya FC–Makati | Biñan^{a} |
| 16:00 UTC+8 | | | | Stadium: Biñan Football Stadium |

Match deemed a forfeiture due to home stadium unavailability. Originally scheduled on 27 May 2017. Kaya awarded a 0-3 win.

| 10 September 2017 18 | JPV Marikina | 1–0 | Kaya FC–Makati | Manila^{a} |
| 16:00 UTC+8 | | | | Stadium: Rizal Memorial Stadium |

| 16 September 2017 19 | Stallion Laguna | 1–0 | JPV Marikina | Biñan |
| 16:00 UTC+8 | | | | Stadium: Biñan Football Stadium |

| 23 September 2017 20 | JPV Marikina | 1–2 | Ilocos United | Biñan^{a} |
| 16:00 UTC+8 | | | | Stadium: Biñan Football Stadium |

| 15 October 2017 21 | Global Cebu | 2–1 | JPV Marikina | Cebu City |
| 19:00 UTC+8 | | | | Stadium: Cebu City Sports Complex |

| 18 October 2017 22 | Ceres–Negros | 2–2 | JPV Marikina | Bacolod |
| 19:00 UTC+8 | | | | Stadium: Panaad Stadium |

| 22 October 2017 23 | JPV Marikina | 0–3; Awarded | Davao Aguilas | Manila^{a} |
| 16:00 UTC+8 | | | | Stadium: Rizal Memorial Stadium |

| 28 October 2017 24 | Ceres–Negros | 5–0 | JPV Marikina | Bacolod |
| 16:00 UTC+8 | | | | Stadium: Panaad Stadium |

| 31 October 2017 25 | Meralco Manila | 1–0 | JPV Marikina | Manila |
| 16:00 UTC+8 | | | | Stadium: Rizal Memorial Stadium |

| 8 November 2017 26 | JPV Marikina | 2–2 | Ceres–Negros | Biñan^{a} |
| 15:00 UTC+8 | Belgira 29'; Celiz (red card) 45+1'; Mahmoud 68' | | Rodriguez 25'; Marañón 34' | Stadium: Biñan Football Stadium |

| 21 November 2017 27 | JPV Marikina | 6–3 | Davao Aguilas | Manila^{a} |
| 16:00 UTC+8 | | | | Stadium: Rizal Memorial Stadium |

| 28 November 2017 28 | Davao Aguilas | 1–1 | JPV Marikina | Tagum |
| 16:00 UTC+8 | | | | Stadium: Davao del Norte Sports Complex |

Note:

- a Because of the ongoing works in the Marikina Sports Complex, the team will play its first few league games at the Biñan Football Stadium and Rizal Memorial Stadium and will have to groundshare with Stallion Laguna and Meralco Manila, respectively.
- b The home stadium of the club is located in Bantay, Ilocos Sur, a nearby town of Vigan. For administrative and marketing purposes, the home city of Ilocos United is designated as "Vigan"
- c Because of the ongoing works in the University of San Carlos Stadium, the team will play its first few league games at the Rizal Memorial Stadium in Manila and will have to groundshare with Meralco Manila.

== Squad ==
=== League squad ===
As of 24 July 2017

Note: Flags indicate national team as defined under FIFA eligibility rules; some limited exceptions apply. Players may hold more than one non-FIFA nationality.

| No. | Pos. | Nation | Player |
|---|---|---|---|
| 1 | GK | (Philippines) PHI | Felipe Tripulca Jr. |
| 2 | GK | (Philippines) PHI | Elijah Aban |
| 3 | DF | (Japan) JPN | Masaki Yanagawa |
| 4 | DF | (Philippines) PHI | Camelo Tacusalme (vice-captain) |
| 5 | MF | (Philippines) PHI | Jayson Cutamora |
| 6 | MF | (Philippines) PHI | Sean Patrick Kane |
| 7 | FW | (Japan) JPN | Takumi Uesato |
| 8 | MF | (Philippines) PHI | Ali Mahmoud |
| 9 | MF | (Philippines) PHI | Robert Cañedo (vice-captain) |
| 10 | FW | (Philippines) PHI | Satoshi Otomo |
| 11 | MF | (Japan) JPN | Takashi Odawara (Captain) |
| 14 | MF | (Philippines) PHI | Alen Angeles |

| No. | Pos. | Nation | Player |
|---|---|---|---|
| 15 | DF | (Philippines) PHI | Alexandro Elnar (vice-captain) |
| 16 | MF | (Japan) JPN | Atsushi Shimono |
| 17 | MF | (Philippines) PHI | Aaron Altiche |
| 18 | DF | (Philippines) PHI | David Basa |
| 19 | DF | (Philippines) PHI | Lemuel Unabia |
| 20 | FW | (Philippines) PHI | William Espinosa |
| 21 | FW | (Philippines) PHI | J Baguioro |
| 22 | DF | (Philippines) PHI | Kouichi Belgira |
| 23 | MF | (Philippines) PHI | John Celiz |
| 24 | DF | (Philippines) PHI | Jhoguev Ybañez |
| 25 | GK | (Philippines) PHI | Nelson Gasic |
| 27 | DF | (Philippines) PHI | Peter Fadrigalan |
| 29 | DF | (Philippines) PHI | Daishi Takano |
