= 2017 Ilocos United F.C. season =

Ilocos United
2017 season
- Head coach: (Scotland) Ian Gillan
- Stadium: Quirino Stadium
- PFL: 8th (Regular Season)
Home colours	Away colours
- All statistics correct as of 21 November 2017.

The 2017 season is Ilocos United's 1st season in the top flight of Philippines football. The club is managed by an Ilocos-based group, consisting of Filipino-Australian promoter Jarred Kelly and English businessman Tony Lazaro.

The club only managed to secure a single league match victory and placed last in the league table. They withdrew from the league after the season.

== Competitions ==
=== Philippines Football League ===
Pos	Team	Pld	W	D	L	GF	GA	GD	Pts	Qualification or relegation
1	Meralco Manila	28	17	7	4	43	33	+10	58	Qualification for finals series
2	Ceres–Negros (C)	28	17	6	5	76	27	+49	57	Qualification for finals series
3	Kaya FC–Makati	28	14	5	9	52	35	+17	47	Qualification for finals series
4	Global Cebu	28	13	8	7	47	37	+10	47	Qualification for finals series
5	Stallion Laguna	28	9	8	11	39	49	−10	35	
6	JPV Marikina	28	9	6	13	42	48	−6	33	
7	Davao Aguilas	28	4	10	14	35	56	−21	22	
8	Ilocos United	28	1	6	21	24	73	−49	9	

Source: Philippines Football League
Rules for classification: 1) Points; 2) Goal Difference; 3) Goals Scored
(C) Champions

==== Regular season ====
7 May 2017 1	Ilocos United	1–1	Davao Aguilas	Bantay^{a}
16:00 UTC+8				Stadium: Quirino Stadium

13 May 2017 2	Meralco Manila	2–1	Ilocos United	Manila
16:00 UTC+8				Stadium: Rizal Memorial Stadium

31 May 2017 3	Ilocos United	2–4	Kaya FC-Makati	Bantay^{a}
19:00 UTC+8				Stadium: Quirino Stadium

4 June 2017 4	JPV Marikina	2–0	Ilocos United	Manila^{b}
16:00 UTC+8				Stadium: Rizal Memorial Stadium

18 June 2017 5	Ilocos United	0–3	Global Cebu	Bantay^{a}
19:00 UTC+8				Stadium: Quirino Stadium

21 June 2017 6	Ilocos United	1–2	JPV Marikina	Bantay^{a}
19:00 UTC+8				Stadium: Quirino Stadium

25 June 2017 7	Davao Aguilas	0–0	Ilocos United	Tagum
16:00 UTC+8				Stadium: Davao del Norte Sports Complex

1 July 2017 8	Ilocos United	0–1	Meralco Manila	Bantay^{a}
16:00 UTC+8				Stadium: Quirino Stadium

8 July 2017 9	Ceres–Negros	7–0	Ilocos United	Bacolod
16:00 UTC+8				Stadium: Panaad Stadium

16 July 2017 10	Ilocos United	1–1	Stallion Laguna	Bantay^{a}
16:00 UTC+8				Stadium: Quirino Stadium

19 July 2017 11	Kaya FC–Makati	5–2	Ilocos United	Makati
19:00 UTC+8				Stadium: University of Makati Stadium

23 July 2017 12	Kaya FC–Makati	2–1	Ilocos United	Makati
19:00 UTC+8				Stadium: University of Makati Stadium

26 July 2017 13	Stallion Laguna	1–0	Ilocos United	Biñan
19:00 UTC+8				Stadium: Biñan Football Stadium

6 August 2017 14	Global Cebu	2–1	Ilocos United	Cebu City
16:00 UTC+8				Stadium: Cebu City Sports Complex

9 August 2017 15	Ilocos United	2–2	JPV Marikina	Bantay^{a}
16:00 UTC+8				Stadium: Quirino Stadium

16 August 2017 16	Ilocos United	1–4	Stallion Laguna	Bantay^{a}
19:00 UTC+8				Stadium: Quirino Stadium

20 August 2017 17	Meralco Manila	1–0	Ilocos United	Manila
19:00 UTC+8				Stadium: Rizal Memorial Stadium

10 September 2017 18	Stallion Laguna	5–0	Ilocos United	Biñan
16:00 UTC+8				Stadium: Biñan Football Stadium

17 September 2017 19	Ilocos United	0–1	Kaya FC–Makati	Bantay^{a}
16:00 UTC+8				Stadium: Quirino Stadium

23 September 2017 20	JPV Marikina	1–2	Ilocos United	Biñan^{b}
16:00 UTC+8				Stadium: Biñan Football Stadium

30 September 2017 21	Ceres–Negros	5–0	Ilocos United	Bacolod
16:00 UTC+8				Stadium: Panaad Stadium

15 October 2017 22	Davao Aguilas	2–0	Ilocos United	Tagum
16:00 UTC+8				Stadium: Davao del Norte Sports Complex

18 October 2017 23	Ilocos United	2–4	Davao Aguilas	Bantay^{a}
16:00 UTC+8				Stadium: Quirino Stadium

20 October 2017 24	Ilocos United	0–3	Meralco Manila	Bantay^{a}
19:00 UTC+8				Stadium: Quirino Stadium

29 October 2017 25	Global Cebu	3–2	Ilocos United	Cebu City
19:00 UTC+8				Stadium: Cebu City Sports Complex

15 November 2017 26	Ilocos United	3–3	Global Cebu	Bantay^{a}
16:00 UTC+8				Stadium: Quirino Stadium

18 November 2017 27	Ilocos United	1–1	Ceres–Negros	Bantay^{a}
16:00 UTC+8				Stadium: Quirino Stadium

21 November 2017 28	Ilocos United	1–5	Ceres–Negros	Bantay^{a}
16:00 UTC+8				Stadium: Quirino Stadium

Note:

- a The home stadium of the club is located in Bantay, Ilocos Sur, a nearby town of Vigan. For administrative and marketing purposes, the home city of Ilocos United is designated as "Vigan"
- b Because of the ongoing works in the Marikina Sports Complex, the team will play its first few league games at the Biñan Football Stadium and Rizal Memorial Stadium and will have to groundshare with Stallion Laguna and Meralco Manila, respectively.

== Squad ==
=== First-team squad ===
As of 15 August 2017

Note: Flags indicate national team as defined under FIFA eligibility rules; some limited exceptions apply. Players may hold more than one non-FIFA nationality.

No.	Pos.	Nation	Player
1	GK	GHA	Baba Sampana
3	DF	PHI	Allan Auman, Jr.
4	DF	PHI	Robert Reyes
5	DF	PHI	Anton del Rosario
6	MF	PHI	Angelo Marasigan
7	DF	PHI	Paolo Alessio
8	MF	PHI	John Kanayama
9	FW	PHI	Graham Caygill (Vice-captain)
12	FW	PHI	Kennedy Uzoka
13	MF	PHI	Nico Nazal

No.	Pos.	Nation	Player
16	MF	AUS	Andrew Pawiak
17	MF	PHI	Seb Gonzales
18	MF	PHI	Selu Lozano
19	FW	PHI	Chima Uzoka
21	DF	ENG	Adam Mitter (Captain)
22	MF	PHI	David Kamau
23	MF	PHI	Ben Tolete
24	GK	PHI	Jan Cedric Hodreal
25	MF	PHI	Charlie Beaton
26	FW	CIV	Arthur Kouassi

=== Foreign players ===
In the Philippines Football League, there can be at least four non-Filipino nationals in a team as long as they are registered. Foreign players who have acquired permanent residency can be registered as locals.

- (Ghana) Baba Sampana
- (Ivory Coast) Arthur Kouassi
- (England) Adam Mitter
- (Australia) Andrew Pawiak
