= List of Philippines Football League stadiums =

Since the first season of the Philippines Football League, league matches have been played in 11 stadiums from as far north as Bantay in Ilocos Sur and as far south as Tagum in Davao del Norte. While matches of the original United Football League were only played in Metro Manila due to the status of the league, the establishment of the PFL in 2016 saw its teams spread over the Philippines with designated home stadiums. This relocation also saw the record capacity for a PFL match in the Philippines, with over 5,000 people attending a match between Global Cebu and Ceres–Negros in Cebu City.

Due to the COVID-19 pandemic in the Philippines, however, matches since 2020 have been played only at one venue, the PFF National Training Center in Carmona, Cavite, due to the low cost as well as for safety purposes. However, the league plans to hold matches in stadiums again due to the lowering of cases when the 2022 season kicks off in mid-2022.

== Stadiums ==
Stadiums whose names are in bold indicate stadiums currently being used in the 2025–26 Philippines Football League.

| Stadium | Image | Club | Location | Capacity | Last Match | Date | Coordinates | Ref. |
|---|---|---|---|---|---|---|---|---|
| Aboitiz Pitch | | Green Archers United | Lipa, Batangas | 1,500 | Green Archers United 1–0 Philippine Air Force | October 19, 2019 | | |
| Biñan Football Stadium | | Stallion Laguna | Biñan, Laguna | 3,000 | Kaya–Iloilo 2–0 Stallion Laguna | April 13, 2025 | | |
| Campo Alcantara Stadium | | Kaya–Iloilo | Iloilo City, Iloilo | TBD | Kaya–Iloilo 6–0 Philippine Army | June 22, 2024 | | |
| Cebu City Sports Center | | Global Cebu | Cebu City, Cebu | 5,500 | Global Cebu 2–0 Ceres–Negros | November 28, 2017 | | |
| City of Imus Grandstand and Track Oval | | Mendiola 1991 | Imus, Cavite | 4,800 | Mendiola 1991 0–1 Maharlika Manila | March 12, 2023 | | |
| Davao del Norte Sports Complex | | Davao Aguilas | Tagum, Davao del Norte | 3,000 | Davao Aguilas 1–3 Ceres–Negros | July 14, 2018 | | |
| **Dynamic Herb Sports Complex** | | Dynamic Herb Cebu | Talisay, Cebu | 550 | Dynamic Herb Cebu 4–2 Don Bosco Garelli | March 29, 2026 | | |
| Iloilo Sports Complex | | Kaya–Iloilo | Iloilo City, Iloilo | 7,000 | Kaya–Iloilo 1–1 Manila Digger | April 5, 2025 | | |
| Marikina Sports Center | | JPV Marikina | Marikina, Metro Manila | 15,000 | JPV Marikina 2–1 Global Cebu | March 3, 2018 | | |
| McKinley Hill Stadium | | Maharlika Manila | Taguig, Metro Manila | 2,000 | Maharlika Manila 0–1 Stallion Laguna | June 4, 2023 | | |
| New Clark City Athletics Stadium | | United City | Capas, Tarlac | 20,000 | United City 1–0 Stallion Laguna | November 5, 2022 | | |
| Panaad Stadium | | Ceres–Negros | Bacolod, Negros Occidental | 8,000 | Ceres–Negros 4–1 Stallion Laguna | August 25, 2018 | | |
| PFF National Training Center | | Azkals Development Team | Carmona, Cavite | 1,000 | Maharlika Manila 1–2 Mendiola 1991 | June 4, 2023 | | |
| Quirino Stadium | | Ilocos United | Bantay, Ilocos Sur | 5,000 | Ilocos United 1–5 Ceres–Negros | September 21, 2017 | | |
| **Rizal Memorial Stadium** | | No team | Manila, Metro Manila | 12,873 | Maharlika 2–0 Aguilas–UMak | March 29, 2026 | | |
| University of Makati Stadium | | Kaya–Makati | Makati, Metro Manila | 3,295 | Davao Aguilas 1–0 Manila Digger | April 21, 2024 | | |
| UP Diliman Football Field | | No team | Quezon City, Metro Manila | 1,300 | Kaya–Iloilo 3–1 Dynamic Herb Cebu Cebu | February 2, 2025 | | |
