= List of Philippines Football League clubs =

The following is a list of clubs who have played in the Philippines Football League since its inception in 2017.

Over the five years and four seasons of the league, fifteen teams have played or will play in the league, 4 clubs based in the Visayas region, 1 based in Mindanao, and the rest in Luzon. 11 teams at one point or another were based within Metro Manila, while one club (Philippine Air Force) has no designated home stadium. Following the league's franchise requirements, most teams applying for a provisional license must forge a partnership with their home city. Mendiola 1991, after obtaining an AFC license, currently have Imus, Cavite as their home province while their stadium is under construction in Taytay, Rizal. Likewise, United City are temporarily based in Capas, Tarlac while their stadium is under construction in Pampanga.

Of the original 8 founding members, only three clubs are still participating in the league: United City, Kaya–Iloilo, and Stallion Laguna. One club, formerly known as Meralco Manila and presently known as Loyola, plans to join the league in the 2022 season. Three of the clubs have not yet participated in a full-length league season, having first participated in either the shortened 2020 season or in the subsequent editions of the Copa Paulino Alcantara. One team, namely the Azkals Development Team, is a guest team as well as a developmental team but treats itself as a professional club and a permanent member of the league. Of the fifteen teams, two clubs are named after sponsors (Ceres–Negros and Dynamic Herb Cebu).

Aside from Loyola, there have been other multiple changes of names and localities since the league started in 2017. Kaya, now based in Iloilo, was known as Kaya–Makati until relocating in early 2018. Davao Aguilas changed their name to Davao Aguilas Bellmare following the club's partnership with Shonan Bellmare of Japan. The now-defunct Global was once based in Cebu and was known as Global Cebu, then relocated to Makati and renamed themselves to Global Makati, then before the blacklisting of the club in mid-2020, they renamed to "Global" without the locality in the club name. The most notable example is United City, who were formerly known as Ceres–Negros until 2020, when the club folded and was taken over by MMC Sportz Asia, relocating from Bacolod to Capas.

== Table ==
All statistics refer to the clubs' participation in the PFL only, not counting their records in the Copa Paulino Alcantara. For the top scorer section, players whose names are marked in bold still play for the club they scored the most goals for. Clubs whose names are in bold are current members while clubs in italics were founding members.

Club	Location	First season	Latest season	Seasons	Most recent finish	Highest finish	Top scorer
**Azkals Development Team**	Carmona	2020	2022	1	3rd	3rd	Jarvey Gayoso (4)
Ceres–Negros	Bacolod	2017	2019	3	1st	1st	Bienvenido Marañón (67)
Davao Aguilas	Tagum	2017	2018	2	3rd	3rd	Phil Younghusband (17)
**Dynamic Herb Cebu**	Cebu City	2022	2022	0	TBD	TBD	TBD
Global Cebu	Makati	2017	2019	3	7th	2nd	Darryl Roberts (15)
Green Archers United	Lipa	2019	2019	1	4th	4th	John Celiz, Stephen Appiah (7)
Ilocos United	Bantay	2017	2017	1	8th	8th	Chima Uzoka (8)
JPV Marikina	Marikina	2017	2018	2	5th	5th	Darryl Roberts (15)
**Kaya–Iloilo**	Iloilo City	2017	2022	4	2nd	2nd	Jordan Mintah (54)
**Maharlika Manila**	Manila	2020	2022	1	5th	5th	Jeremy Theuer, Jose Montelibano (1)
**Mendiola 1991**	Imus	2019	2022	2	4th	4th	Ashley Flores (10)
Meralco Manila	Manila	2017	2017	1	3rd	3rd	Curt Dizon, Tahj Minniecon (7)
Philippine Air Force	None	2019	2019	1	6th	6th	Darl Poderoso (3)
**Stallion Laguna**	Biñan	2017	2022	4	6th	3rd	Jesus Melliza (33)
**United City**	Capas	2020	2022	1	1st	1st	Bienvenido Marañón (7)

== Overview of clubs by season ==
Club	2017	2018	2019	2020	2022
Azkals Development Team				3	TBD
Ceres–Negros	1	1	1		
Davao Aguilas	7	3			
Dynamic Herb Cebu					TBD
Global Cebu	2	6	7		
Green Archers United			4		
Ilocos United	8				
JPV Marikina	6	5			
Kaya–Iloilo	4	2	2	2	TBD
Maharlika Manila				5	TBD
Mendiola 1991			5	4	TBD
Meralco Manila	3				
Philippine Air Force			6		
Stallion Laguna	5	4	3	6	TBD
United City				1	TBD

Legend
PFL Champion and qualified for AFC Champions League or AFC Cup
Qualified for AFC Champions League or AFC Cup
Participated in PFL
Did not participate in PFL
