= Gilmàr Fernandez =

Filipino football player (born January 1994)

Personal information
- Full name: Levi Gilmàr di Silvà Fernandez-Lynch
- Date of birth: 21 January 1994 (age 32)
- Place of birth: Lewisham, London, England
- Positions: Winger; striker

Youth career
- 2002–2008: Millwall
- 2008–2009: Leyton Orient
- 2009–2012: Dagenham & Redbridge

Senior career*
Years	Team	Apps	(Gls)
2012–2013	Floriana	0	(0)
2013–2015	Balzan	10	(1)
2015	Alloa Athletic	0	(0)
2015	→Stallion (loan)	6	(0)
2016–2017	Dinamo-Auto	17	(4)
2017	Davao Aguilas	16	(0)
2017–2019	Morecambe	2	(0)
2018–2019	→Global Cebu (loan)	6	(0)
2019	Global Cebu	2	(0)
2019	Bangkok	5	(0)
2020–	Global Makati		
- * Club domestic league appearances and goals as of 6:49, 31 January 2020 (UTC)

Gilmàr Fernandez (born 21 January 1994) is a Filipino former professional footballer who played as a winger or striker.

== Career ==
=== Youth ===
==== Millwall ====
Born in Lewisham, London, Fernandez started his youth career at Millwall.

In 2004, Fernandez had a trial with Spanish giants Barcelona.

==== Leyton Orient ====
In 2008, after playing for Millwall's youth team, Fernandez joined the youth team of Leyton Orient.

==== Dagenham & Redbridge ====
After playing a single season with Leyton Orient's U16 team, Fernandez received scholarship offers from Crawley Town, Macclesfield Town, Cambridge United before joining the youth team of Dagenham & Redbridge.

=== Floriana ===
In 2012, after being released by Dagenham & Redbridge, Fernandez joined Maltese Premier League club Floriana.

In 2013, Coventry City had reportedly made a €20,000 bid for Fernandez but the deal was unable to push through due to the club receiving a transfer embargo in January 2014.

=== Balzan ===
In 2013, after playing one season with Floriana, Fernandez joined Maltese Premier League club Balzan.

On 25 April 2014, Fernandez made his debut for Balzan in a 1–3 defeat against Mosta.

=== Alloa Athletic ===
In 2015, after his 2-year stint with Balzan, Fernadez joined Scottish Championship club Alloa Athletic.

Fernandez featured for the reserve side of the Wasps.

==== Loan to Stallion ====
Months after joining the club, the management of Alloa then allowed Gilmar to join United Football League club Stallion in a 6-month loan with an option of extending for another 6 months.

=== Dinamo-Auto ===
In 2016, after being released by Alloa Athletic, Fernandez joined Divizia Națională club Dinamo-Auto.

=== Davao Aguilas ===
In 2017, six months after joining Dinamo-Auto, Fernandez joined Philippines Football League club Davao Aguilas.

On 11 May 2017, Fernandez made his debut for Davao in a 1–1 away draw against Ilocos United.

=== Morecambe ===
In 2017, after his short stint with Davao Aguilas, Fernandez joined EFL League Two club Morecambe.

=== Global Cebu ===
In July 2018, Fernadez returned to the Philippines as he joined Philippines Football League club Global Cebu in a 6-month loan.

In 2019, Fernandez was released by Morecambe and joined Global Cebu on a free transfer.

=== Bangkok ===
Fernandez left Global Cebu and joined Thai League 3 club Bangkok.

=== Return to Global Makati ===
On 30 January 2020, Fernandez returned to Philippine Football and rejoined Global Makati. He previously joined the club way back 3rd season of the PFL.

== International career ==
Fernandez was born in England to a Jamaican father and a Filipina mother, which made him eligible to represent England, Jamaica and the Philippines at international level.

=== Philippines U-23 ===
In August 2019, Fernandez was invited to train with the Philippines U-23 in preparation for the 2019 Southeast Asian Games which will be held in the Philippines.

== Personal life ==
Fernandez was born in Lewisham, London, England, the son of former Crystal Palace footballer Rodney Lynch and Filipina Charmainne Johanna Antheà Fernandez.
