= Miloš Krstić =

Miloš Krstić may refer to:

- Miloš Krstić (footballer, born 1987), Serbian association football midfielder
- Miloš Krstić (footballer, born 1988), Serbian association football centre-back
