= University of San Carlos Stadium =

Football stadium in Cebu City, Philippines

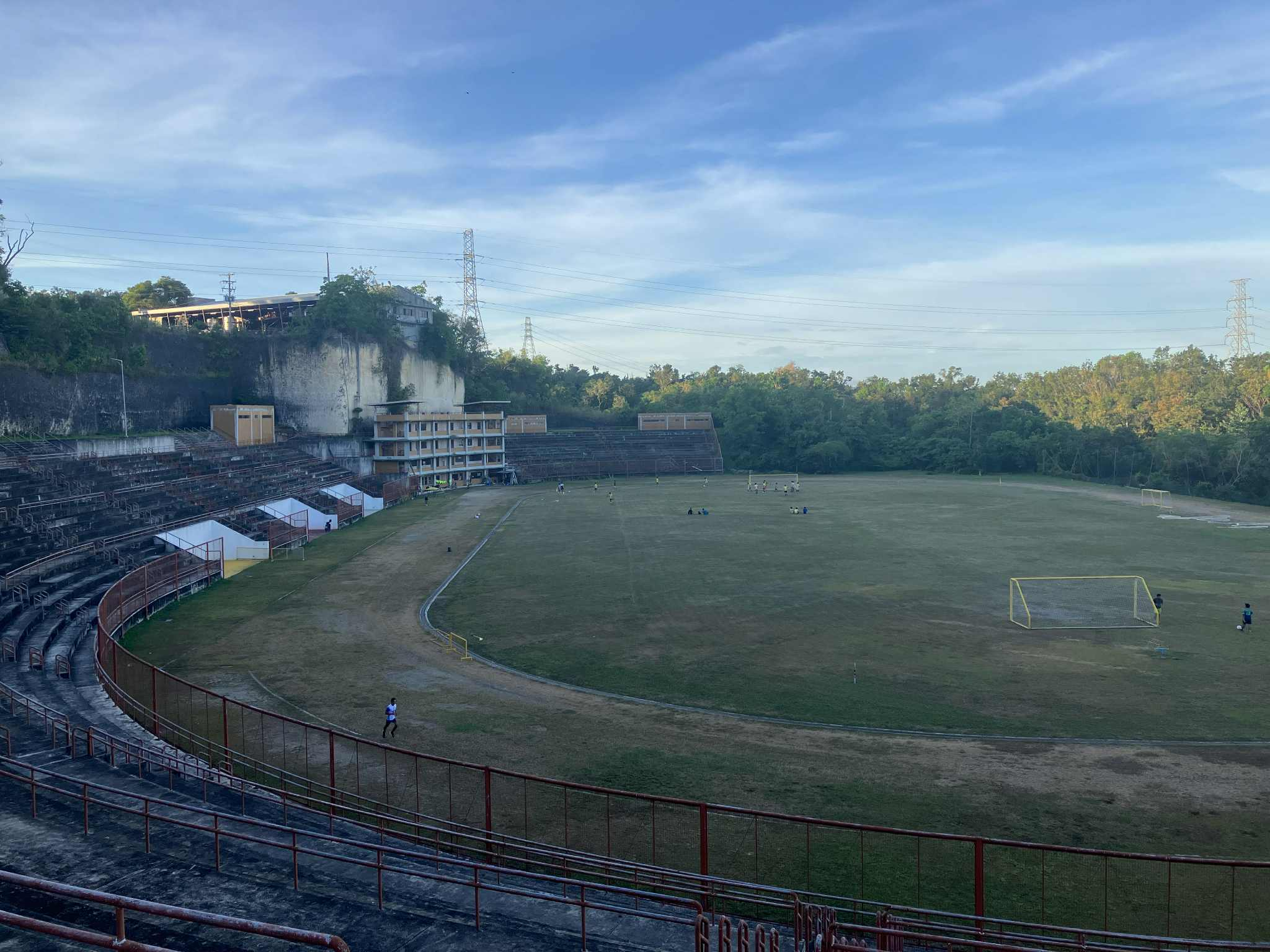
- Interactive map of University of San Carlos Stadium
- Location: Talamban, Cebu City, Philippines
- Coordinates: 10°21′25.1″N 123°54′35.6″E
- Owner: University of San Carlos
- Operator: University of San Carlos
- Surface: Grass

Construction
- Groundbreaking: 2005

The University of San Carlos Stadium is a football stadium under construction in Cebu City, Philippines. It is located within the grounds of the Talamban campus of the University of San Carlos which operates and own the facility.

== Construction ==
Works on building the stadium began as early as 2005. Two hills were carved as part of the stadium earthworks which was finished by 2011. A 5,000 m^{3} (180,000 ft^{3}) dam was built beside the dam to augment the stadium's field. Ike Madamba was hired by the university as the stadium's architect, who also led the renovation of the Rizal Memorial Stadium. It was planned to be completed by 2012.

By April 2017, the stadium's construction is still not complete. Global Cebu F.C. which was then considering the stadium as their home venue as part of the Philippines Football League to provide funds for the stadium's completion. The Philippine Football Federation later confirmed the stadium as the club's home venue but the club later decided to use the Cebu City Sports Complex as their home ground instead.
