= Baba Sampana =

Ghanaian footballer (born 1991)

Personal information
- Date of birth: 14 December 1990 (age 35)
- Place of birth: Ghana
- Height: 1.85 m (6 ft 1 in)
- Position: Goalkeeper

Senior career*
Years	Team	Apps	(Gls)
2007	Shelter Force		
2008	Real Sportive		
2009	Eleven Wise		
2009–2010	Hearts of Oak		
2011–2013	Medeama		
2013–2014	Loyola	14	(0)
2014–2015	Team Socceroo	25	(0)
2017–	Ilocos United	2	(0)

International career
2007	Ghana U17		
2008	Ghana U20		
- * Club domestic league appearances and goals

Baba Sampana (born 14 December 1990) is a Ghanaian professional footballer who last played as a goalkeeper for the Philippines Football League side Ilocos United F.C. in the Philippines.

== Club career ==
Sampana moved in January 2008 from Shelter Force to Real Sportive, with whom he played one year. He then left Real Sportive for Eleven Wise in 2009 and in August 2009 signed for Accra Hearts of Oak SC.

== International career ==
Sampana was member of the Ghana U17 national team in 2007 FIFA U-17 World Cup in Korea Republi]. On 19 August 2008, he was first called for the Ghana U20.

== Honours ==
Loyola

- UFL Cup: 2013

Individual

- UFL Cup Golden Gloves: 2013
