= Miloš Krstić (footballer, born 1988) =

Serbian footballer (born 1988)

Personal information
- Full name: Miloš Krstić
- Date of birth: 19 November 1988 (age 37)
- Place of birth: Kragujevac, SFR Yugoslavia
- Height: 1.87 m (6 ft 1 1/2 in)
- Position: Centre-back

Youth career
- Voždovac

Senior career*
Years	Team	Apps	(Gls)
2006–2010	Balkan Mirijevo		
2011	BSK Borča	6	(0)
2011–2013	Mladenovac	43	(1)
2013–2015	Radnik Surdulica	74	(7)
2016	Borac Čačak	26	(0)
2017	Kolubara	5	(0)
2017	Davao Aguilas	14	(1)
2018	Sinđelić	5	(0)
2018–2019	Al-Mujazzal		
2019-2020	Kolubara	6	(0)
2020	Dinamo Pančevo		
2021	Omladinac Novi Banovci		
2021-2022	Karađorđe Mišar		
2022-	Vranić		
- * Club domestic league appearances and goals as of 12 May 2017

Miloš Krstić (Serbian Cyrillic: Милош Крстић; born 19 November 1988) is a Serbian professional footballer who plays as a defender. He is currently a free agent.

== Career ==
He made his first football steps in Voždovac, but have gained affirmation with Balkan Mirijevo. From season 2008/09 to 2010/11 the club had advanced from 5th to 3rd rank in Serbian football league system. Individually, Krstić had achieved even more by signing for Serbian SuperLiga side BSK Borča, thus became a player that had advanced through four ranks in only two years. In summer 2013, Krstić became player of Radnik Surdulica.

== Personal life ==
Born in Kragujevac in central Serbia, but have never actually lived there, Krstić spent his infant years living in Priština, until NATO bombing of Yugoslavia in 1999. Apart from playing football, he had simultaneously attending education and got a diploma of a Faculty of Traffic and Transport Engineering at University of Belgrade.

== Honours ==
Radnik Surdulica

- Serbian First League: 2014–15
