= Groundshare =

Concept of two sports teams using one stadium

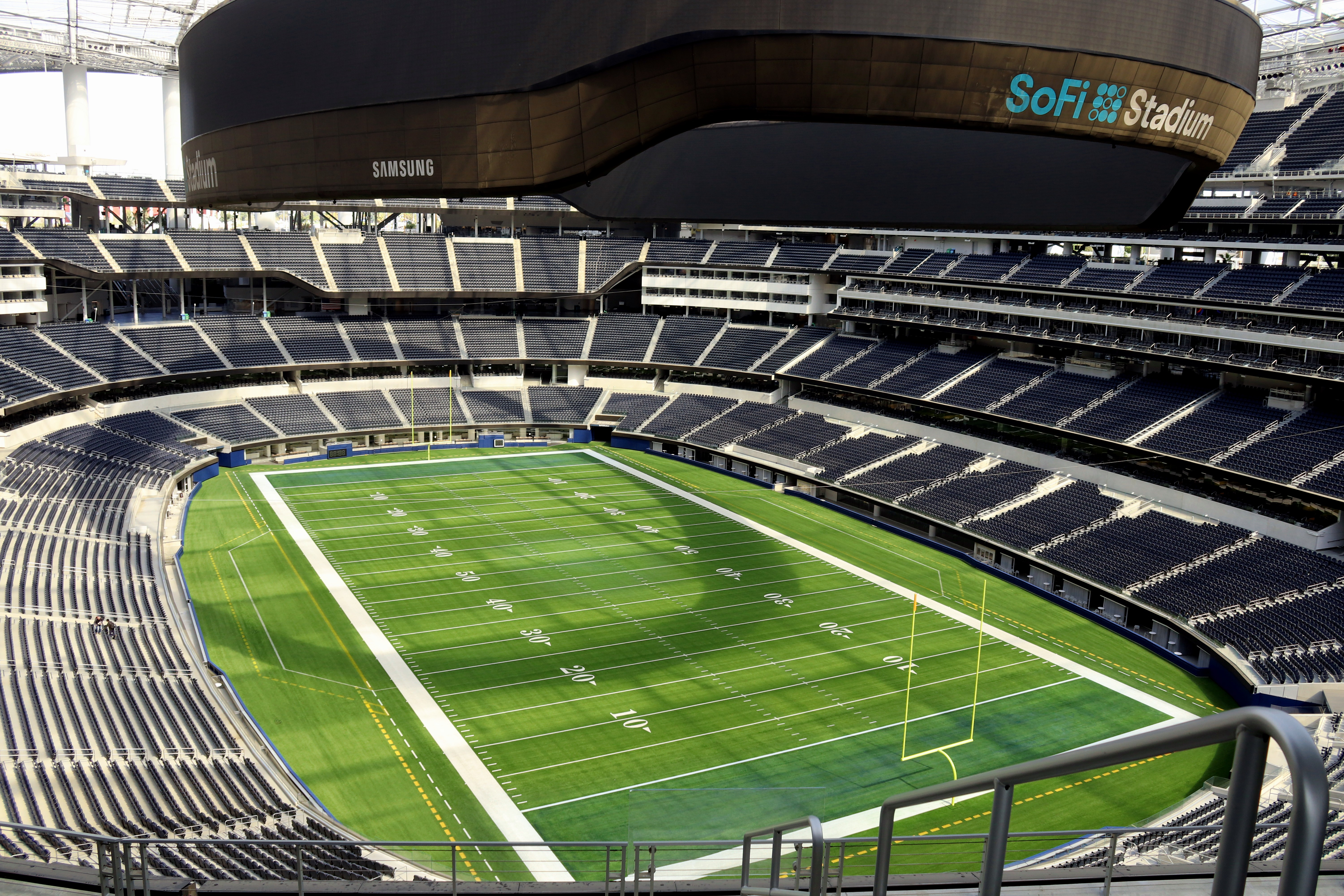
SoFi Stadium in Los Angeles, the shared home of the Los Angeles Rams and Los Angeles Chargers

A groundshare, also known as a shared stadium or shared arena, is the principle of sharing a stadium between two local sports teams. This is usually done for the purpose of reducing the costs of either construction of two separate facilities and related maintenance.

== Types of groundshares ==
=== Intersport groundshares ===
Given sufficient compatibility between facility requirements, two teams that do not play the same sport may share a ground or a stadium. North American indoor arenas commonly feature basketball and ice hockey teams sharing the facility during their common fall-to-spring season; a layer of insulation and a basketball floor can easily be laid over or removed from the hockey rink, and dasher boards disassembled or reconfigured, in a matter of hours.

Historically baseball and American football teams often shared a large general-purpose outdoor or domed stadium, particularly during the multi-purpose stadium era of the 1960s–1990s, despite the dissimilarity of their fields; historically before the television age, the National Football League and its teams rented baseball stadiums and did not have the resources to build a team-specific stadium outside of rare examples such as the two-stadium Truman Sports Complex in Kansas City, Missouri.

This practice fell out of fashion in the 1990s as baseball teams entered the retro-classic ballpark age, where stadiums became more classically styled to the sport, and were intentionally sized to disallow a football layout entirely unless they have a deep outfield, along with seating arrangements which would disadvantage the views football spectators. In turn, the NFL's popularity allowed their teams to demand and have stadiums build specifically designed to host that sport, along with being able to easily accommodate domestic or international soccer as American spectator interest in that sport grew. The development of Major League Soccer and the United States soccer league system then allowed for the development of soccer-specific stadiums which could also host college football and high school football without the overhead and 'empty bowl' feel of the 50,000+ seats required to host an NFL game.

Sharing between football codes is also posible, as association football and rugby codes.

A variation on the groundshare concept exists commonly within the National Basketball Association and the National Hockey League. As the space requirements for a regulation NHL hockey rink can easily contain a regulation NBA basketball court comfortably with additional courtside seating, in many cases where a metropolitan area has both an NBA and an NHL franchise, the teams will share the same arena.

=== Intrasport groundshares ===
Two teams in this arrangement share the same ground. These may be two non-competing teams who play at different levels, such as Bury F.C., renting Gigg Lane to F.C. United of Manchester in England. For economical reasons, this is often done to allow a city with multiple teams in the same sport to share one site, or due to local opposition (mainly from competing venues) against having two stadiums devoted to the same sport in a metropolitan area, an arrangement done for the New York Giants and Jets at MetLife Stadium after the Jets' own proposal to build a stadium on the west side of Manhattan was rejected due to local opposition. Several NFL teams share their stadiums with local Division I college football teams and also feature bowl games, and are often the site of state high school football championship games.

=== Intraleague groundshare ===
This is where two teams in the same league share the same ground, such as the New York Giants and New York Jets sharing MetLife Stadium and the Los Angeles Chargers and Los Angeles Rams share SoFi Stadium, in Inglewood.

In the NBA, two franchises shared one arena from 1999 to 2024: both the Los Angeles Lakers and the Los Angeles Clippers shared Staples Center/Crypto.com Arena. The Clippers moved to their new arena, the Intuit Dome, at the start of the 2024–25 season.

== Examples of groundsharing ==
=== Intraleague groundshares ===
==== American Football ====
- MetLife Stadium: New York Giants and New York Jets
- SoFi Stadium: Los Angeles Rams and Los Angeles Chargers

==== Association Football ====
- Ajinomoto Stadium: FC Tokyo and Tokyo Verdy 1969
- Azadi Stadium: Persepolis F.C. and Esteghlal F.C.
- Estádio Algarve: S.C. Farense and Louletano D.C.
- Estádio do Maracanã: CR Flamengo and Fluminense FC
- Estadio Nemesio Camacho ("El Campín"): Millonarios, Santa Fe
- Estadio Azteca: Club América and Cruz Azul
- Gamla Ullevi: IFK Göteborg, GAIS, Örgryte IS
- Jan Breydel Stadium: Club Brugge K.V. and Cercle Brugge K.S.V.
- Letzigrund: FC Zürich currently share their home stadium with Grasshopper Club Zürich until the completion of Grasshopper Zurich's new stadium.
- Melbourne Rectangular Stadium: Melbourne Victory FC, Melbourne City FC, Western United FC
- Kadir Has Stadium: Kayserispor and Kayseri Erciyesspor
- Philip II Arena: FK Vardar and FK Rabotnički
- Salt Lake Stadium: Mohun Bagan Super Giant, East Bengal FC and Mohammedan SC
- Stade Charléty: Paris FC and Paris Saint-Germain Féminines
- Stadio Giuseppe Meazza ("San Siro"): A.C. Milan and Inter Milan
- Stadio Luigi Ferraris: U.C. Sampdoria and Genoa C.F.C.
- Stadio Olimpico: A.S. Roma and S.S. Lazio
- Teddy Stadium: Beitar Jerusalem F.C. and Hapoel Jerusalem F.C.
- 3Arena: Djurgårdens IF Fotboll and Hammarby Fotboll
- Veritas Stadion: FC Inter Turku and Turun Palloseura

==== Australian Rules Football ====
- Adelaide Oval: Adelaide, Port Adelaide
- Docklands Stadium: Carlton, Essendon, North Melbourne, St Kilda and Western Bulldogs
- Melbourne Cricket Ground: Collingwood, Hawthorn, Melbourne and Richmond
- Perth Stadium: Fremantle and West Coast

==== Baseball ====
- Jamsil Baseball Stadium: LG Twins and Doosan Bears

==== Ice Hockey ====
- Nokia Arena: Ilves and Tappara

=== Former intraleague groundshares ===
==== Association Football ====
- Allianz Arena: Bayern Munich shared their home stadium with TSV 1860 Munich from 2005 until 2017.
- Boleyn Ground: West Ham United F.C. shared their home stadium with Charlton Athletic F.C. from 1991 until 1992.
- Estadio Jalisco: Futbol Club Atlas and Guadalajara until Guadalajara moved to their new home of Estadio OmniLife in 2010.
- Grünwalder Stadion: TSV 1860 Munich shared their home stadium with Bayern Munich from 1926 until 1972.
- Heritage Park: Bishop Auckland and Darlington
- Maine Road: Manchester City F.C. shared their home stadium with Manchester United F.C. from 1945 until 1949.
- Moss Rose: Macclesfield Town F.C. shared their home stadium with Chester City F.C. from 1990 until 1992.
- Munich Olympic Stadium: Bayern München and TSV 1860 München shared this stadium from 1972 until 2005.
- Parc des Princes : Paris Saint-Germain and Racing Paris between 1982 and 1989.
- Priestfield Stadium: Gillingham F.C. shared their home stadium with Brighton & Hove Albion F.C. from 1997 until 1999.
- Queensgate Stadium (England) : Bridlington Town and Scarborough Athletic
- Selhurst Park: Crystal Palace F.C. shared their home stadium with Charlton Athletic F.C. from 1985 until 1991 and latterly Wimbledon F.C. from 1991 until 2003.
- Stadio delle Alpi: Juventus and Torino shared this stadium from 1990 until 2006.
- Stadio Olimpico di Torino: Juventus and Torino shared this stadium from 1958 until 1990 and latterly from 2006 until 2011.
- StubHub Center: Los Angeles Galaxy and CD Chivas USA from 2005 until Chivas USA folded in 2013.
- Twerton Park: Bath City F.C. shared their home stadium with Bristol Rovers F.C. from 1986 until 1996 and latterly Team Bath F.C. from 1999 until 2009.
- Ullevaal Stadion: Vålerenga, Lyn until 2009.
- Watling Street: Dartford F.C. shared their home stadium with Maidstone United F.C. from 1988 until 1992.
- White Hart Lane: Tottenham Hotspur shared their home stadium with Arsenal from 1940 until 1946.

==== Baseball ====
- Tokyo Dome: Yomiuri Giants and Hokkaido Nippon Ham Fighters (1988–2003).

==== Basketball ====
- Crypto.com Arena: Los Angeles Lakers and Los Angeles Clippers (1999–2024).

==== Rugby ====
- Halton Stadium: Widnes Vikings shared their home stadium with St Helens R.F.C. in 2011.

=== Intersport groundshares ===
- American Airlines Center: Dallas Mavericks (basketball) and Dallas Stars (ice hockey)
- Ashton Gate: Bristol City FC and Bristol Rugby.
- Ball Arena: Colorado Avalanche (ice hockey) and Denver Nuggets (basketball)
- BC Place: BC Lions (Canadian football) and Vancouver Whitecaps FC (association football)
- BMO Field: Toronto Argonauts (Canadian football) and Toronto FC (association football)
- Blackwell Meadows: Darlington RFC (rugby union) and Darlington F.C. (association football)
- Brentford Community Stadium: Brentford F.C. (association football) share their home stadium with London Irish (rugby union)
- Boundary Park: Oldham Athletic A.F.C. (football) shared their home stadium with Oldham R.L.F.C. (rugby league) from 1997 until 2001; 2003 until 2009; and from 2024.
- Capital One Arena: Washington Capitals (ice hockey) and Washington Wizards (basketball)
- Climate Pledge Arena: Seattle Kraken (ice hockey) and Seattle Storm (basketball)
- Crypto.com Arena: Los Angeles Lakers (basketball) share with the Los Angeles Kings (ice hockey).
- Coventry Building Society Arena: Wasps (rugby union) share their home stadium with Coventry City F.C. (association football)
- DW Stadium: Wigan Athletic F.C. (association football) and Wigan Warriors (rugby league)
- Home's Stadium Kobe: Vissel Kobe (association football) and Kobelco Steelers (rugby union)
- Gateshead International Stadium: Gateshead (association football) and Gateshead Thunder (Rugby League)
- Gillette Stadium: New England Patriots (American football/NFL) and New England Revolution (US Major League Soccer)
- John Smith's Stadium: Huddersfield Town A.F.C. (association football) and Huddersfield Giants (rugby league)
- KC Stadium: Hull City A.F.C. (association football) and Hull F.C. (rugby league)
- Keepmoat Stadium: Doncaster Rovers F.C. (association football) share their stadium with Doncaster (rugby league).
- Little Caesars Arena: Detroit Pistons (basketball) and Detroit Red Wings (ice hockey)
- Lumen Field: Seattle Seahawks (American football), Seattle Sounders FC (association football), and Seattle Reign FC (association football)
- Madison Square Garden: New York Knicks (basketball) and New York Rangers (ice hockey)
- Meadow Lane: Notts County F.C. (association football) share their home stadium with Nottingham R.F.C. (rugby union).
- Rodney Parade: Newport County A.F.C. (association football) and Dragons RFC (rugby union).
- Salford City Stadium: Salford City Reds (rugby league) share their home stadium with Sale Sharks (rugby union).
- Sapporo Dome: Hokkaido Nippon Ham Fighters (baseball) and Consadole Sapporo (association football)
- Scotiabank Arena: Toronto Maple Leafs (ice hockey) and Toronto Raptors (basketball)
- The Shay: FC Halifax Town (association football) share their home stadium with Halifax (rugby league).
- Spotland Stadium: Rochdale A.F.C. (association football) share their home stadium with Rochdale Hornets (rugby league).
- Stade Jean Bouin: Paris Musketeers (American football), Red Star FC (association football) and Stade Français (rugby union)
- Suncorp Stadium: Brisbane Roar (football), Brisbane Broncos (rugby league) and Queensland Reds (rugby union)
- Swansea.com Stadium: Swansea City A.F.C. (association football) and Ospreys (rugby union).
- TD Garden: Boston Bruins (ice hockey) and Boston Celtics (basketball)
- United Center: Chicago Blackhawks (ice hockey) and Chicago Bulls (basketball)
- War Memorial Ground: Stourbridge FC (association football) and Stourbridge Cricket Club (cricket)
- Xfinity Mobile Arena: Philadelphia 76ers (basketball) and Philadelphia Flyers (ice hockey)
- Yamaha Stadium: Júbilo Iwata (association football) and Yamaha Júbilo (rugby union)
- Yankee Stadium: New York Yankees (baseball) and New York City FC (soccer)

==== Former ====
- Adams Park: Wycombe Wanderers F.C. (association football) shared their home stadium with London Wasps (rugby union) from 2002 until 2014.
- Anaheim Stadium (now Angel Stadium of Anaheim): California Angels (baseball; now Los Angeles Angels) shared with Los Angeles Rams (American football) from 1980 to 1994
- Barclays Center: Brooklyn Nets (basketball) shared with New York Islanders (ice hockey) from 2015 to 2019
- Bramall Lane: Yorkshire County Cricket Club (cricket) shared the stadium with Sheffield FC (football) from 1862 until 1875, Sheffield Wednesday F.C. (football) from 1868 until 1888 and Sheffield United F.C. (football) from 1889 until 1975.
- Busch Memorial Stadium: St. Louis Cardinals (baseball) shared with St. Louis Cardinals (American football) from 1966 to 1987 and St. Louis Rams (American football) in 2005
- Cardiff City Stadium: Cardiff City F.C. (football) and Cardiff Blues (rugby union) from 2009 until 2012.
- Deepdale: Preston North End F.C. (football) shared their home stadium with Lancashire Lynx (rugby league) from 1996 until 2000.
- Craven Cottage: Fulham F.C. (football) shared their home stadium with Fulham RLFC (rugby league) from 1980 until 1984.
- Don Valley Stadium: Rotherham United F.C. (football) shared with Sheffield Eagles (rugby league) in this predmoninately athletics stadium in 2008 and latterly from 2011 until 2012.
- Edgeley Park: Stockport County F.C. (football) shared their home stadium with Sale Sharks (rugby union) from 2003 until 2012, when Sale moved to the Salford City Stadium.
- Elland Road: Leeds United F.C. (football) shared their home stadium with Hunslet (rugby league from the mid-1980s until 1995.
- Giants Stadium: New York Giants and New York Jets (American football) and New York Red Bulls (association football) until its demolition in 2009.
- Griffin Park: Brentford F.C. (football) shared their home stadium with London Broncos (rugby league) from 2002 until 2006.
- Headingley Rugby Stadium: Leeds Rhinos (rugby league) shared their stadium with Leeds Tykes (rugby union).
- Hubert H. Humphrey Metrodome: Minnesota Twins (baseball until 2009), Minnesota Vikings (American football – NFL), University of Minnesota Golden Gophers (American football – NCAA under 2009)
- Kingdome: Seattle Seahawks (American football) shared with Seattle Sounders (association football) from 1976 to 1983, Seattle Mariners (baseball) from 1977 to 1999, and Seattle SuperSonics (basketball) from 1978 to 1985
- Kingston Park: Newcastle Falcons (rugby union), Newcastle Blue Star (now defunct) (football) until 2009.
- Loftus Road: Queens Park Rangers F.C. (football) shared their home stadium with London Wasps (rugby union) from 1996 until 2002 and latterly with Fulham F.C. (football) from 2002 until 2004.
- Madejski Stadium: Reading F.C. (association football) shared their home stadium with Richmond F.C. (rugby union) from 1998 until 1999 and subsequently with London Irish (also rugby union) from 2000 until 2020.
- Memorial Stadium (Bristol): Bristol Rovers (football) and Bristol Rugby (rugby union) from 1996 until 2014
- Oakland Alameda Coliseum: Oakland Athletics (baseball) and Oakland Raiders (American football)
- Odsal Stadium: Bradford Northern RLFC (rugby league) shared their home stadium with Bradford City A.F.C. (football) from 1985 until 1986.
- Racecourse Ground: Wrexham A.F.C. (football) shared their home stadium with North Wales Crusaders (rugby league) from 2012 until 2016.
- RFK Stadium: Washington Redskins (football) shared with the second Washington Senators baseball from 1962 to 1971 and various NASL soccer clubs intermittently from 1968 to 1984, then D.C. United soccer in 1996; United then shared with the Washington Nationals from 2005 until 2007.
- Rogers Centre (formerly SkyDome): Toronto Blue Jays (baseball) shared with Toronto Argonauts (Canadian football) from 1989 to 2015 and Toronto Raptors (basketball) from 1995 to 1999.
- Sixfields Stadium: Northampton Town F.C. shared their home stadium with Coventry City F.C. between 2013 and 2014.
- St Andrew's: Birmingham City F.C. shared their home stadium with Coventry City F.C. between 2019 and 2021.
- State Farm Arena: Atlanta Hawks (basketball) shared their home arena with Atlanta Thrashers (ice hockey) between 1999 and 2011.
- StubHub Center: Los Angeles Galaxy (football) shared their home temporarily with the Los Angeles Chargers (American football)
- Talking Stick Resort: Phoenix Coyotes (ice hockey) and Phoenix Suns (basketball)
- Twickenham Stoop: Harlequin F.C. (rugby union) shared their home stadium with London Broncos aka Harlequins RL (rugby league) from 1997 until 1999 and latterly from 2007 until 2013.
- The Valley: Charlton Athletic F.C. (football) shared their home stadium with London Broncos (rugby league) from 1996 to 1997 and latterly from 1999 to 2000.
- Valley Parade: Bradford City A.F.C. (football) shared their home stadium with Bradford Park Avenue A.F.C. (football) from 1973 until 1974 and latterly Bradford Bulls (rugby league) from 2001 until 2002.
- Vicarage Road: Watford F.C. (football) shared their home stadium with Wealdstone F.C. from 1991 until 1994 and latterly Saracens F.C. from 1997 until 2013.
