= Quirino Stadium =

Sports facility in Ilocos Sur, Philippines

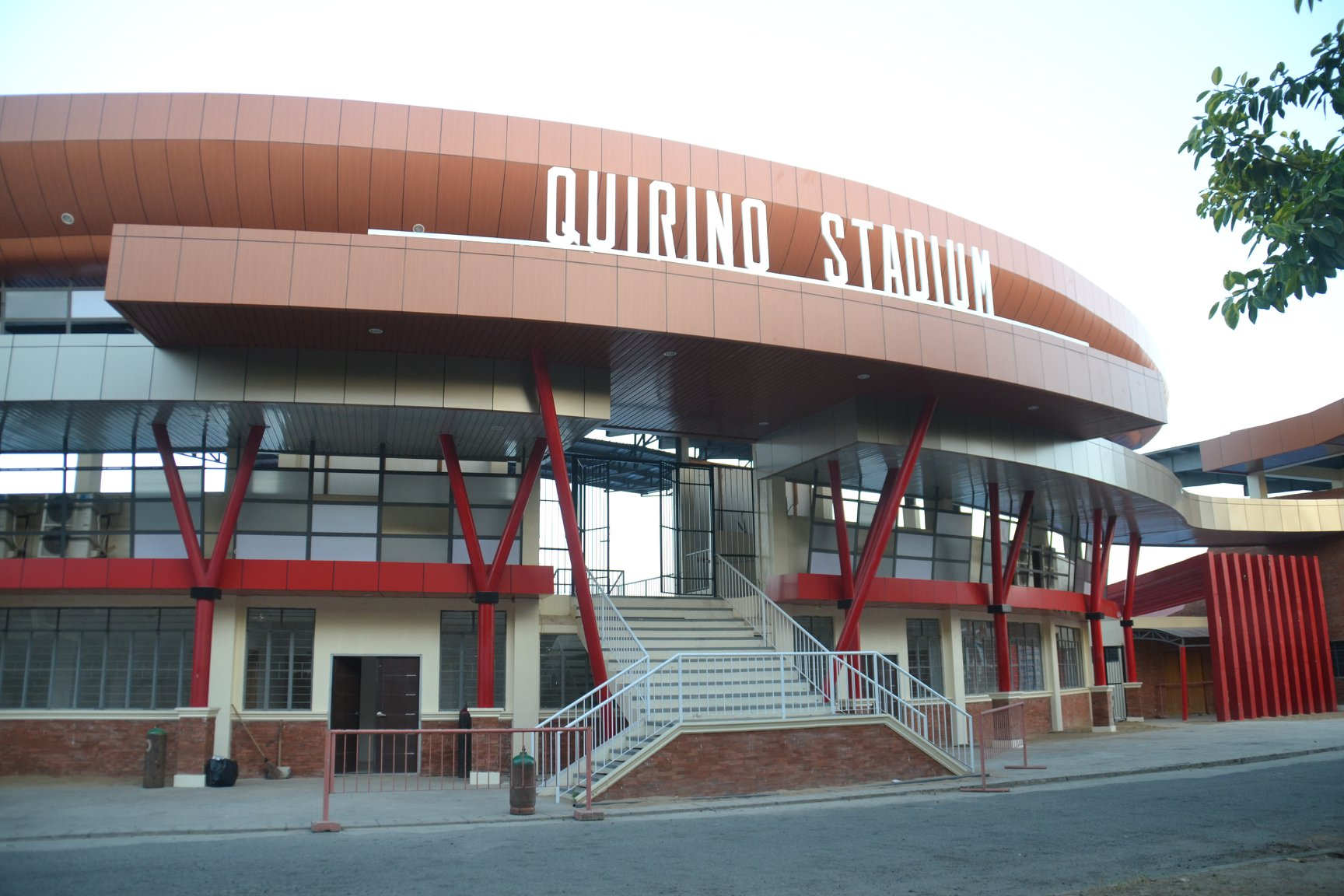
- Main facade
- Interactive map of Quirino Stadium
- Full name: President Elpidio Quirino Stadium
- Location: Bantay, Ilocos Sur, Philippines
- Coordinates: 17°34′39.1″N 120°23′24″E
- Capacity: 5,000
- Surface: Artificial turf

Construction
- Opened: 1953
- Renovated: 2016

Tenant
- Ilocos United F.C. (2017)

The President Elpidio Quirino Stadium, simply known as the Quirino Stadium, is a sports facility in the town of Bantay, Ilocos Sur, Philippines.

== History ==
The Quirino Stadium was inaugurated in 1953 by then President Elpidio Quirino, the namesake of the sports venue and hosted the 6th Palarong Pambansa, a national multi-sport event for students.

The sports facility underwent an Ilocos Sur government-funded rehabilitation from February 2014 to April 2016 Firmbuilders, Inc. was involved in the rehabilitation of the sports facility. The Quirino Stadium had a re-inauguration on April 30, 2016. The rehabilitation was done as part of Ilocos Sur's unsuccessful bid to host the 2017 edition of the Palarong Pambansa though the facility later became part of the province's successful bid for the 2018 edition of the games.

A historical marker at the stadium was unveiled on February 2, 2018 to commemorate the bicentennial foundation anniversary of the province of Ilocos Sur.

== Facilities ==
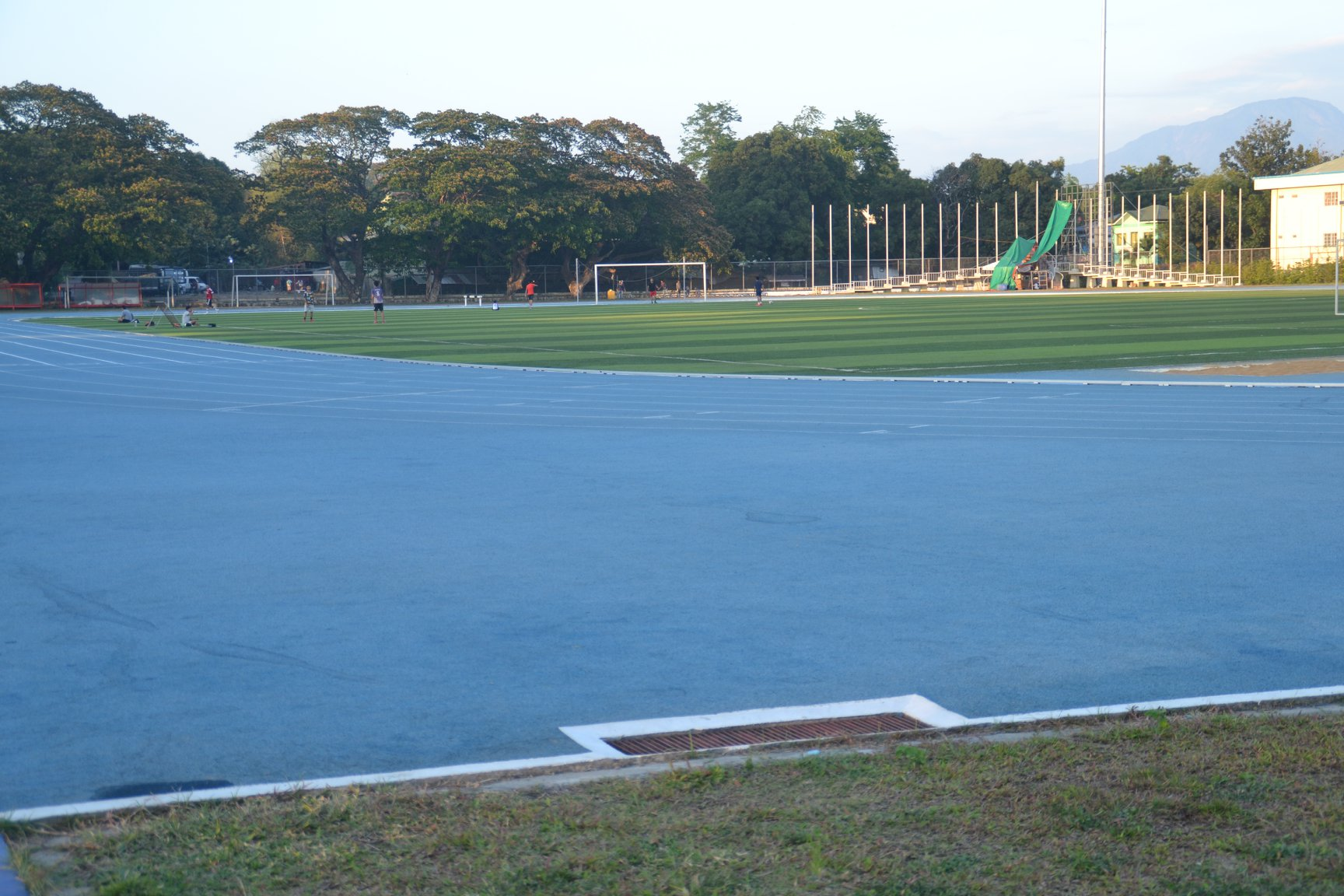
Their track oval and artificial grass football field

Prior to the Quirino Stadium's rehabilitation which completed in April 2016, the sports facility used to be unadorned. The stadium's rubberized athletics track, basketball and lawn tennis courts, as well as its artificial grass football pitch were installed as part of the 2016 renovations. The stadium has a seating capacity of 5,000 but it can hold as much as 7,000 people.

== Events ==
=== Athletics ===
The Quirino Stadium has also hosted the Region 1 Athletic Association meet, an athletics tournament for sportspeople from the Ilocos Region. It hosted the regional tournament in 2017.

=== Multi-sport ===
The Palarong Pambansa, a national students' games, has been hosted at the Quirino Stadium when the venue was inaugurated in 1953. The stadium will host events of the 2018 edition of the games. The 2017 edition of the Batang Pinoy tournament has also been hosted in the stadium.

=== Football ===
The Quirino Stadium hosted the first international match of the Philippine national football team in Northern Luzon against Australian club Perth Glory FC. The match was attended by 6,000 people on June 26, 2016 ended in a 0–2 defeat for the Philippine national side. Ilocos United F.C. used the stadium as their home venue during the inaugural season of the Philippines Football League in 2017.
