= Ilocos United F.C. =

Association football club in the Philippines

Ilocos United
- Full name: Ilocos United Football Club
- Short name: ILO
- Founded: 2017; 9 years ago
- Ground: Quirino Stadium; Bantay, Philippines
- Capacity: 5,000
- Coordinates: 17°34′39.1″N 120°23′24″E
- League: Philippines Football League
- 2017: PFL, 8th
Home colours	Away colours

The Ilocos United Football Club was a Filipino professional football club based in Vigan, Ilocos Sur. The team played in the inaugural season of the Philippines Football League (PFL), the highest level of Philippine club football. As part of the league, the team played its home games at the Quirino Stadium in the nearby town of Bantay.

The club was managed by an Ilocos-based group, consisting of Filipino-Australian promoter Jarred Kelly and English businessman Tony Lazaro.

== History ==
The club's history traces back to when Filipino-Australian businessman Jarred Kelly arranged two friendly matches between the Philippines national football team against Australian A-League side Perth Glory FC in 2016. The first friendly which was hosted at the Rizal Memorial Stadium was attended by only 500 people but the second friendly at the Quirino Stadium in Bantay, Ilocos Sur was attended by 7,000 people. Kelly deemed that it was viable to successfully promote football in the Ilocos Region.

When the Philippine Football Federation (PFF) invited interested parties to send a club to participate at the inaugural season of the Philippines Football League (PFL) in 2017. Kelly, along with Sydney-based English businessman Tony Lazaro formed Ilocos United F.C. and submitted requirements for the club's participation in the inaugural PFL.

After settling for four draws and 15 defeats, Ilocos United secured their first win in the PFL by winning 2–1 against JPV Marikina at the Biñan Stadium on September 23, 2017. Ilocos finished last among 8 teams for the 2017 season, only managing to win once.

After participating in the inaugural PFL season, Ilocos United announced its withdrawal from the league on January 18, 2018, after failing to secure a new naming sponsor. It said to be "cautious optimistic about the return to the PFL in the 2019 season and focus on grassroots football in Ilocos".

== Stadium ==
The team's home venue was the Quirino Stadium, which can seat around 5,000 spectators.

== Head coaches ==
Name	Year(s)
(Scotland) Ian Gillan	2017

== Records ==
Season	Division	Teams	League Position
2017	1	8	8th (Regular Season)
2017	1	8	DNQ (Final Series)
