= Cebu City Sports Center =

Stadium in the Philippines

- Abellana
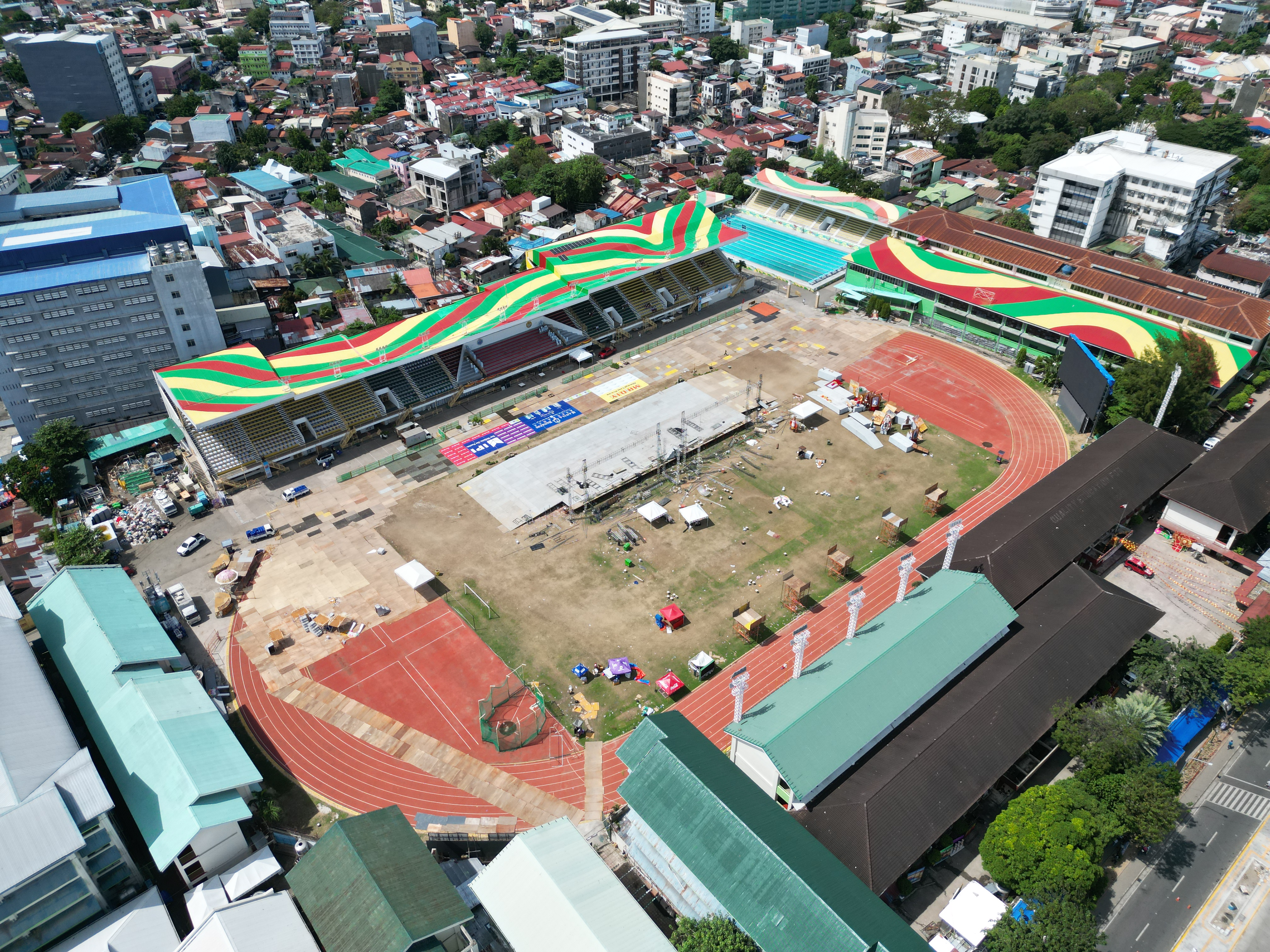
- The sports complex during the 2025 Sinulog
- Interactive map of Cebu City Sports Center
- Address: Cebu City; Philippines
- Coordinates: 10°18′1.52″N 123°53′43.02″E
- Operator: Cebu City Government
- Main venue: Main Stadium; Capacity: 8,000
- Facilities: Swimming pool; Multipurpose building

Construction
- Built: 1993
- Opened: 1994
- Renovated: 2023–24
- Cost: ₱160 million
- General contractors: WT Construction, Inc. (WTCI) - Track Oval, Swimming Pool, Gymnasium

Tenants
- Sinulog (1996–2022, 2025–present); Global Cebu F.C. (2017–2018)

The Cebu City Sports Center (CCSC), colloquially referred to as Abellana, is a sports complex in Cebu City. It is also known for being the main venue of the annual Sinulog festival.

== History ==
=== Former Abellana Stadium ===
The land where the Cebu City Sports Center (CCSC) currently stands was used by the Abellana National School in the 1960s and 1970s for school activities including the grandstand structure. The Cebu City government allegedly gave the land to the Abellana school through deeds of donation in 1963 and 1973. The structure then was known as the Abellana National Stadium. The site which has already become dilapidated by 1992.

=== Cebu City Sports Center ===
The Cebu City government filed a bid to host the 1994 Palarong Pambansa in 1992 and the Abellana National Stadium was proposed to be the main venue of the games. The new facility costing ₱160 million opened as the Cebu City Sports Center in time for the national student-athlete competition which opened in April 1994. The initial facilities include the grandstand and track oval, the gymnasium and swimming pool area.

The track oval underwent major renovation in 2012.

The CCSC was closed in 2020 due to the COVID-19 pandemic and later used as an isolation facility starting 2021. It reopened for regular public use in February 2022.

In May, 2024, the Cebu City Council granted P65 million budget for CCSC renovation. Its track oval was closed from May 18, 2023, forcing practicing athletes to use the Cebu Business Park. The swimming pool area was also renovated including the conversion of the children's pool to a practice area. CCSC is the final venue for the 64th Palarong Pambansa according to acting Mayor Raymond Alvin Garcia. The venue reopened on June 27, 2024.

== Ownership ==
The Cebu City Sports Center is owned and ran by the Cebu City government. However, the ownership of the lot where the sports complex stands has long been disputed between the Abellana National School and the Cebu City government. The sports complex is still colloquially referred to as "Abellana".

== Usage ==
The Cebu City Sports Center was built as a multi-purpose facility for sports competitions and concerts.

The CCSC has been the traditional venue of the Sinulog Festival run by the Sinulog Foundation since 1996. The festival was briefly held at the South Road Properties in 2023 and 2024 before returning to the CCSC.

Philippines Football League club Global Cebu F.C. used the CCSC as their home venue in 2017. Although by the 2018 season, Global has reverted playing their home games in Manila.

=== Other notable events ===
In November 2012, the stadium hosted its first ever FIFA international football match, a friendly between the Philippines and Singapore, which ended in a 1–0 win for the Philippines. In 2014, the Philippines national team returned to the stadium in a friendly match against Malaysia, ending in a 0–0 draw.

== Facilities ==
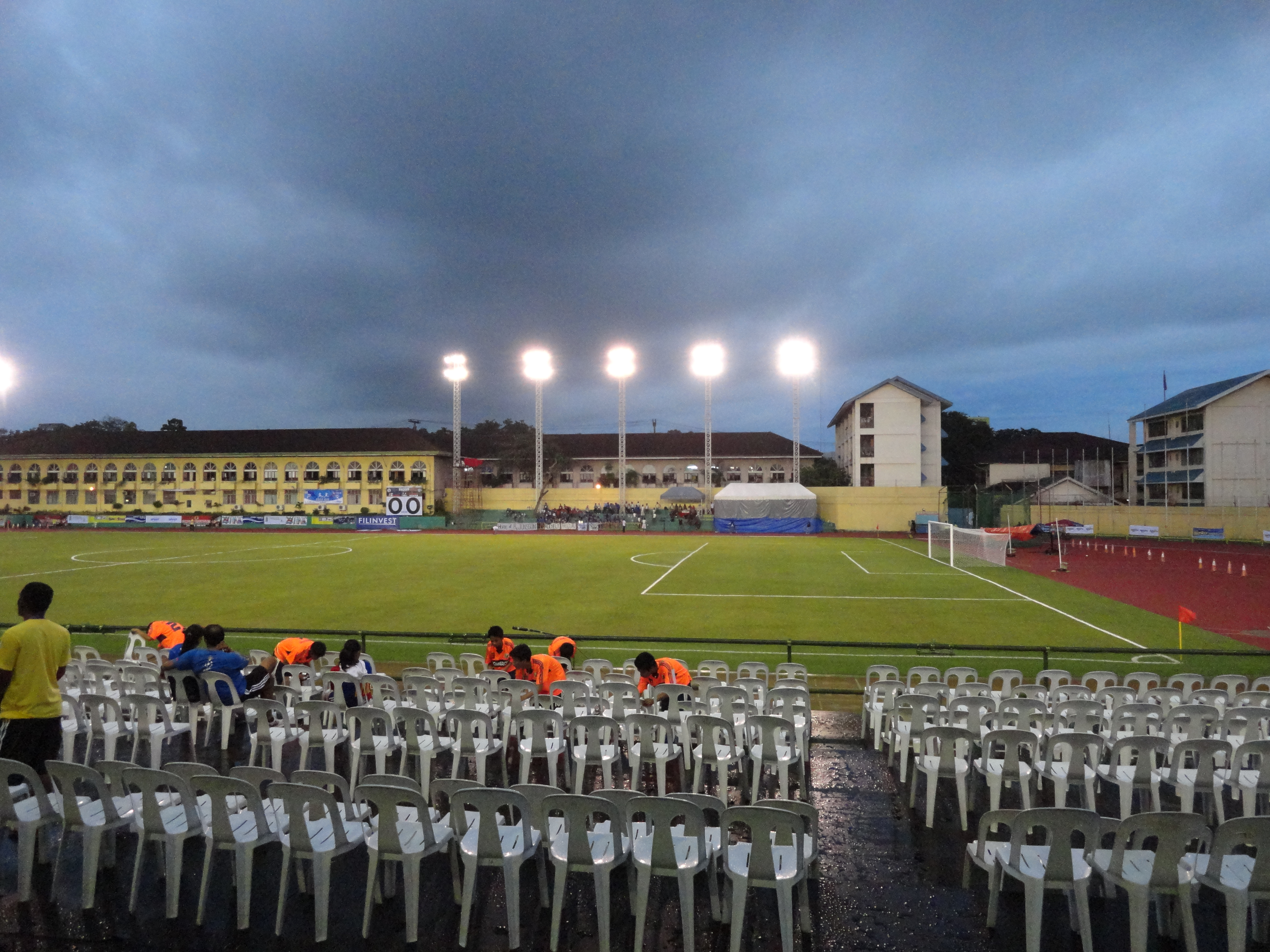
The stadium under a football configuration. (2012)

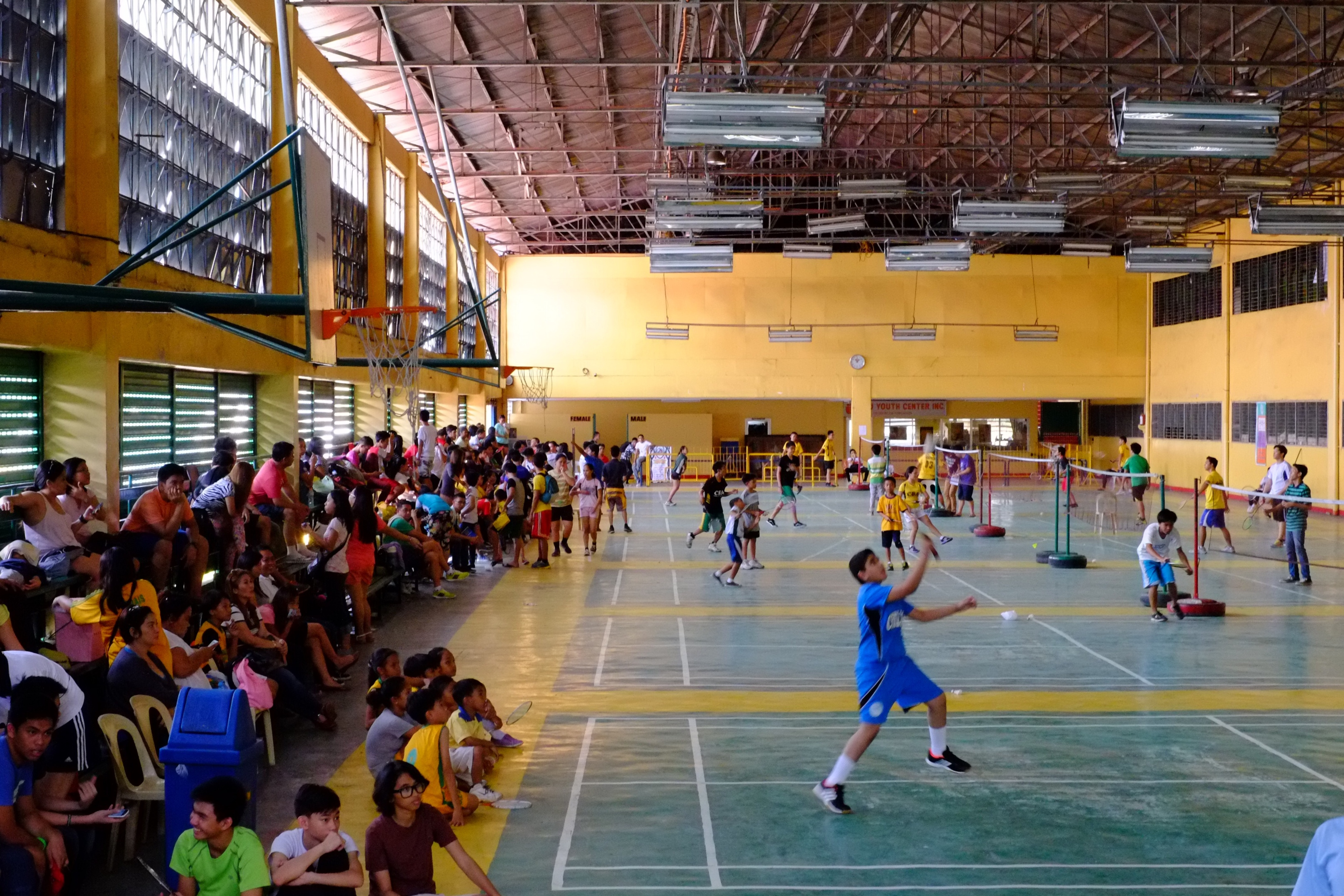
Badminton players at the gymnasium (2014)

The Cebu City Sports Center has a main stadium with a track oval and a 8,000-seater grandstand, although it has a full capacity of 12,000 people. The sports complex's aquatic center has a 50-by-25-meter (164 ft × 82 ft) 10-lane swimming pool and a 25-meter (82 ft) practice swimming area, as well as its own grandstand. The CCSC also has a multi-purpose gym.

Venue	Purpose	Seating capacity	Year built	Notes
Main stadium	Athletics track and football venue	8,000	1994	
Swimming pool	Aquatic sports venue	–	1994	
Multi-purpose gym	Indoor sports venue	–	1994	

== See also ==
- Dynamic Herb Sports Complex
- Cebu FA
- Cebu Coliseum
