= Bantay =

Municipality in Ilocos Sur, Philippines

- Municipality
- Municipality of Bantay
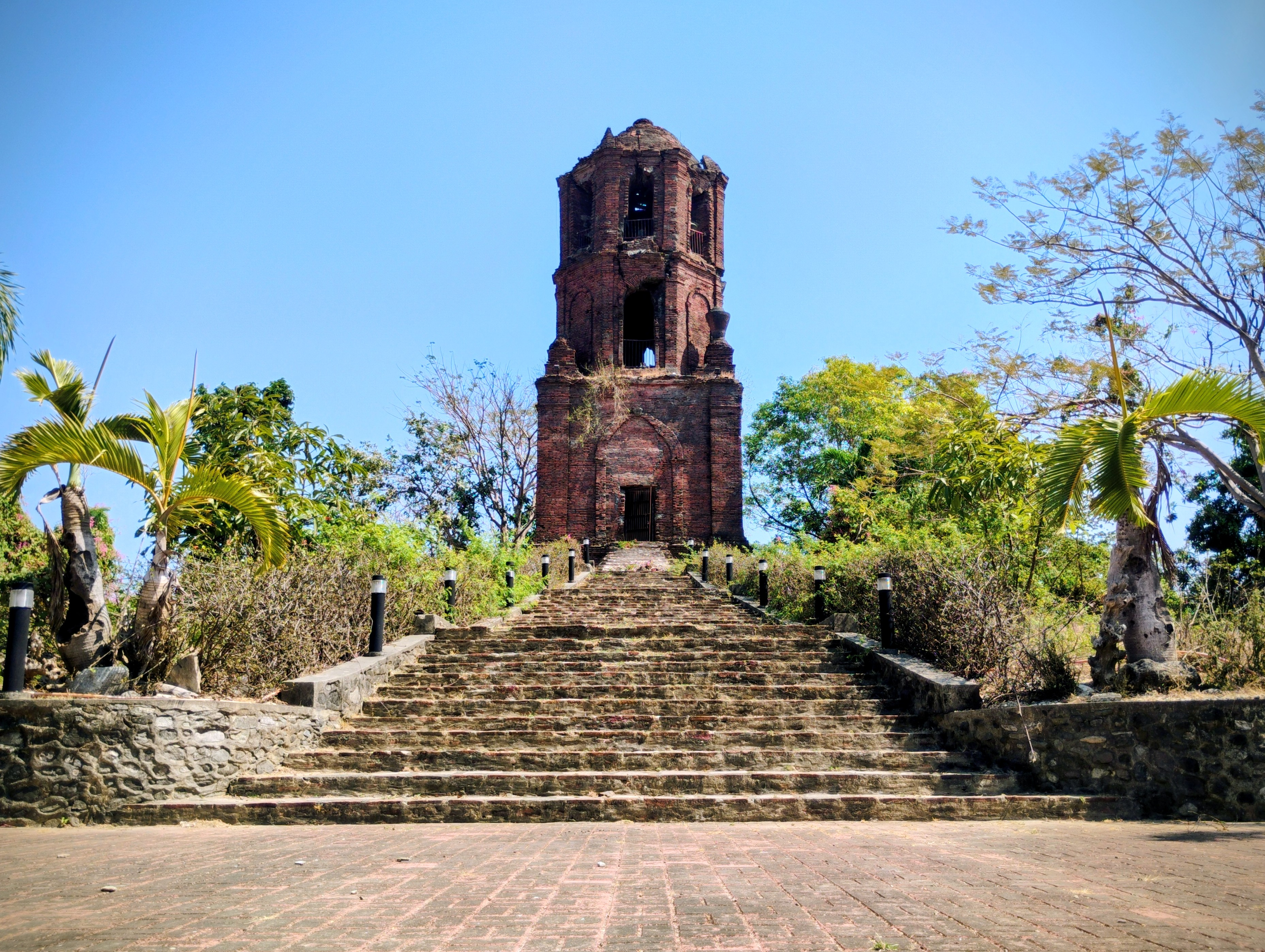
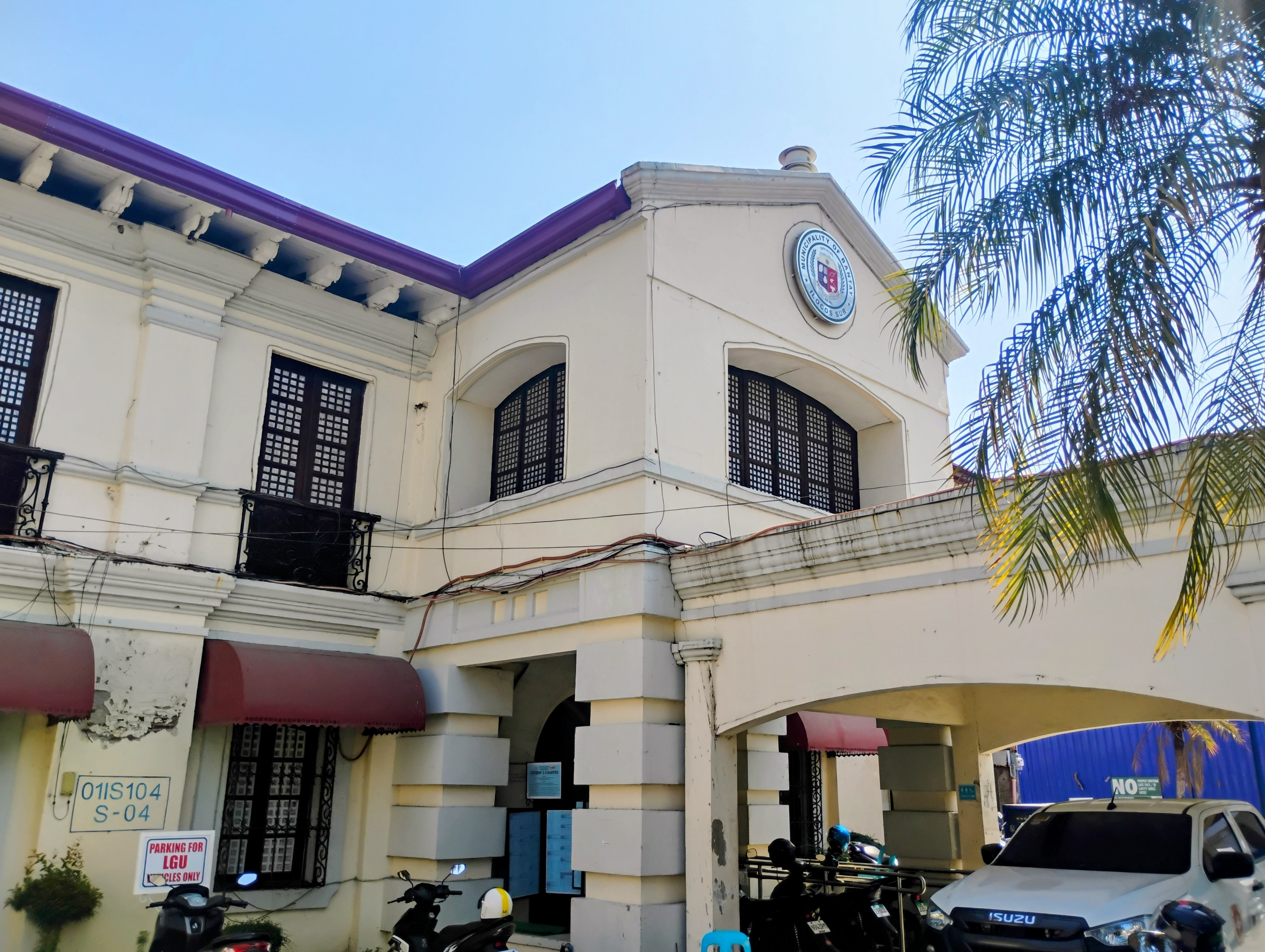
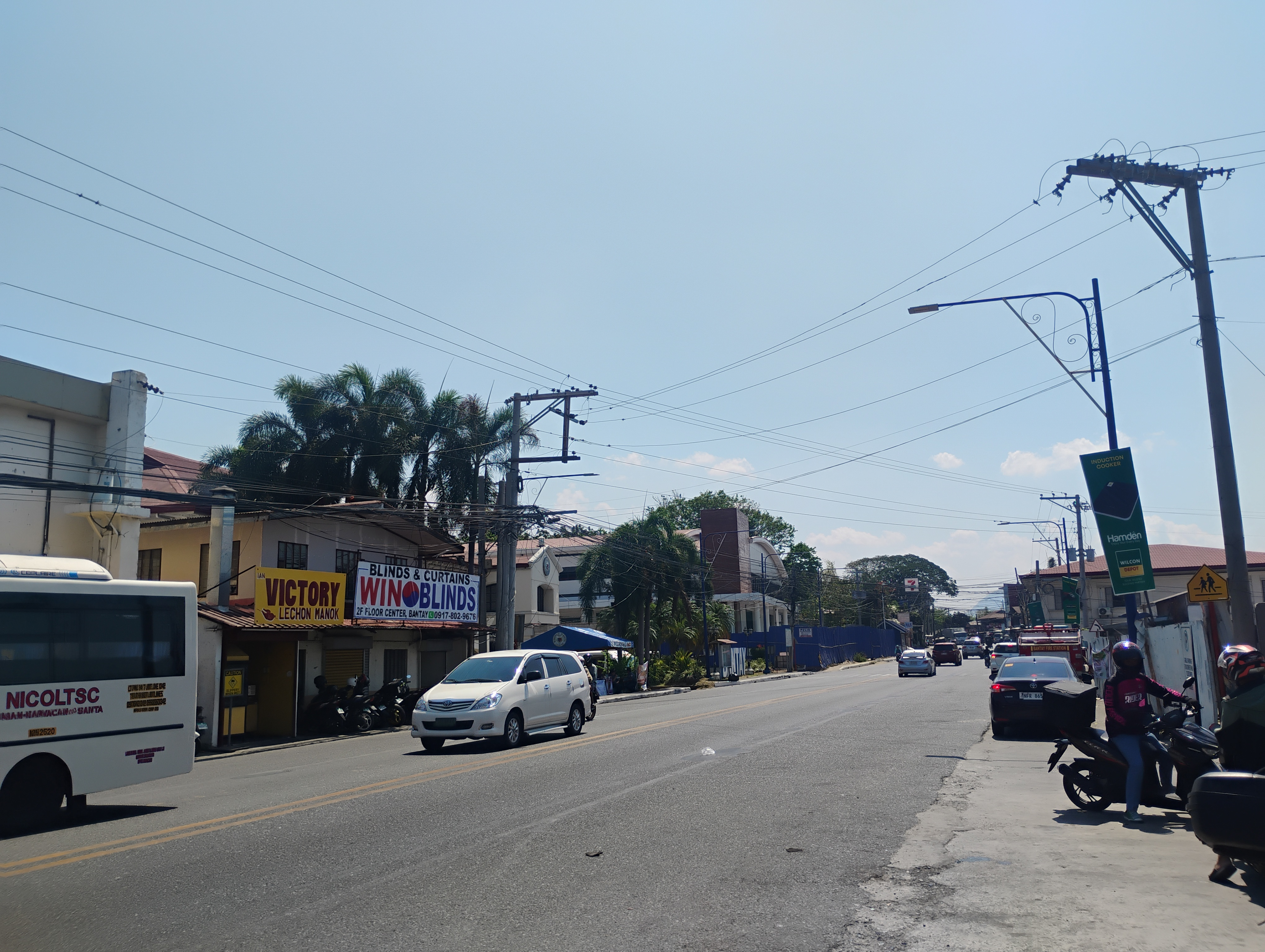
- Bantay Church Bell Tower Bantay Municipal Hall MacArthur Highway along Bantay

- Seal
- Motto: Dur-as Bantay (Progressive Bantay)
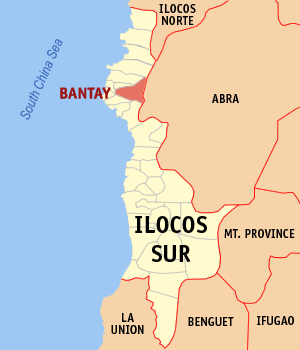
- Map of Ilocos Sur with Bantay highlighted
- Interactive map of Bantay
- Location within the Philippines
- Coordinates: 17°35′02″N 120°23′27″E
- Country: Philippines
- Region: Ilocos Region
- Province: Ilocos Sur
- District: 1st district
- Founded: 1593
- Barangays: 34 (see Barangays)

Government
  - Type: Sangguniang Bayan
  - Mayor: Samuel C. Parilla
  - Vice Mayor: William A. Pre
  - Representative: Ronald Singson
  - Municipal Council: Members: Floro P. Peredo; Hipolito A. Madriaga; Hilario L. Paet; Araceli S. Nabor; Edilberto P. Mercurio; Ireneo P. Quintinita; Aniceto P. Ramos; Percival J. Vicencio
  - Electorate: 22,181 voters (2025)

Area
  - Total: 76.60 km^{2} (29.58 sq mi)
- Elevation: 8.0 m (26.2 ft)
- Highest elevation: 44 m (144 ft)
- Lowest elevation: 0 m (0 ft)

Population (2024 census)
  - Total: 37,088
  - Density: 484.2/km^{2} (1,254/sq mi)
  - Households: 9,243
- Demonym: Bantayeño

Economy
  - Income class: 1st municipal income class
  - Poverty incidence: 3.74% (2023)
  - Revenue: ₱ 353 million (2024)
  - Assets: ₱ 987.6 million (2024)
  - Expenditure: ₱ 296.2 million (2024)
  - Liabilities: ₱ 9.526 million (2024)

Service provider
  - Electricity: Ilocos Sur Electric Cooperative (ISECO)
- Time zone: UTC+8 (PST)
- ZIP code: 2727
- PSGC: 0102903000
- IDD : area code: +63 (0)77
- Native languages: Ilocano; Tagalog

Bantay, officially the Municipality of Bantay (Ilocano: Ili ti Bantay; Filipino: Bayan ng Bantay), is a municipality in the province of Ilocos Sur, Philippines. According to the 2024 census, it has a population of 37,088 people.

== History ==
=== Spanish colonization ===
==== Foundation ====
Spanish conquistador Juan de Salcedo first arrived in Ilocos in 1571 and began setting up tribunals that soon became the seat of the municipal government then. Augustinian friars who followed in 1572 built the convent and house of worship that later became the Iglesia Parroquial de San Agustín (St. Augustine Parish Church).

The parish was recognized in 1591, while the town of Bantay was formally founded as a pueblo that was separate from Vigan in 1593. It is one of the thirty-four (34) towns of the Province of Ilocos Sur, as cited in the Maura Law of 1893. The law also served as the legal basis for its being constituted as a separate political subdivision during the American Regime.

=== Etymology ===
Bantay got its name from the Ilocano word, to guard, which was to guard the image of Our Lady of Charity (Apo Caridad) in her sanctuary.

The early Spanish settlers made the town beautiful by building the 'tribunal' - otherwise known as the town hall - the church, bell tower, roads and streets by forced labor. The St. Augustine Church was originally constructed by Bantay residents using bamboo and cogon materials to house the miraculous image of Our Lady of Charity. In 1590, a stone structure for the church was commissioned following the good fortune it brought to the people. The Augustinian friars chose St. Augustine de Hippo, the Doctor of Grace, as the Patron Saint and the town fiesta used to be celebrated every 28 August, but because of inclement weather during this month, Most Rev. Alfredo Verzosa (Parish Priest, 1912–1916) caused the transfer of the festivity to May 5 every year.

The original inhabitants of the town have family names with letter "P" taken from the designated listing, as an adopted system of the Spanish rulers in all towns of Ilocos Sur, to easily identify and monitor movement of residents. In a report of the Most Reverend Bishop Domingo de Soria on August 15, 1613, the population of Bantay was 4,000 souls, while at the time, Vigan has only 2,000. This can be explained by the fact that by then, Bantay parish was very extensive as it covered the parishes of Magsingal (separated in 1676), Santo Domingo (separated in 1742), San Ildefonso (separated in 1769), San Vicente (separated in 1795), Santa Catalina de Baba (separated in 1795), and Santa Catalina de Alexandria as "visitas".

One of the Augustinian friars, Rev. Francisco Lopez, a great Augustinian philologist, with the help of Pedro Bukaneg, the blind genius of the Ilocano tongue who was from this place and author of the epic - "Biag Ni Lam-ang", labored hard to translate the Bellarmine Cathechism originally written by Robert Cardinal Bellarmine. The book was approved at the Bantay Convent in 1616 printed in Malayan Script and Spanish alphabet and was first published in 1621. The Bellarmine Catechism was the first book in Ilocano to be printed and its influence on the morality, culture and language of the entire Ilocos is measurable.

Several battles have spillovers in Bantay, one of which was the Ilocos Revolution (Dec. 24, 1762 to May 1763) led by Diego Silang. Here, this heroic figure resolved to kill the bishop-elect Bernardo Ustariz and all Spanish friars imprisoned by him in Bantay. The prisoners prayed fervently to Our Lady of Charity for their deliverance until a Spanish mestizo nicknamed "Miguel Vicos" treacherously killed Silang on May 28, 1763, with a pistol at his makeshift fort on a place on a hillside referred to as Calle Encuentro (now Crisologo Street). For the Spaniards, the treacherous Vicos was their savior and to his honor a commemorative monument was erected in 1763 which became the epitome of the Town Plaza. It is replaced later by a memorial to Diego Silang towards the end of the 19th century.

=== During the Marcos dictatorship ===
One of the important events that took place during the presidency of Ferdinand Marcos was the so called "Bantay Arson Incident" of May 22, 1970. The saka-saka, a private army affiliated with Ilocos Sur 1st District Representative Floro Crisologo, burned the barrios of Ora Este and Ora Centro (now both considered Puroks under Barangay Ora) in retaliation for their residents' support for Crisologo's opponent Chavit Singson during the 1996 elections. One resident, Vicenta Balboa, was killed in the blaze when she was unable to get out of her house in time - an incident dramatized in Katski Flores' 2026 Film Edjop.

Public opinion compelled Marcos to investigate the incident and arrest Crisologo's son Vincent, who was reported to be the leader the saka-saka at the time. Historian Alfred W. McCoy notes that Crisologo reportedly went to Marcos and appealed for help, while demanding a greater share of rewards that Marcos had promised him in exchange for supporting his presidential reelection campaign in 1969. When Marcos refused, Crisologo reportedly then threatened to expose Marcos's and Ver's participation in the postwar tobacco monopoly established by Harry Stonehill.

=== Contemporary history ===
Inspired by a vision of strengthening and improving local governance, two municipal buildings known as Annex I (Legislative Building) and Annex II (Puericulture Building) were inaugurated on December 23, 1999, and May 5, 2003, respectively. Considered as milestone feats in the History of Bantay, these massive structures were built to 'reinforce' the Old (Main) Building in order to meet the substantial administrative demands and service requirements of the public clientele.

Dur-as Bantay Era

The Municipality holds the distinction of being the first Local Government Unit in Ilocos Sur to use an Electronic Scoreboard in a sporting event (the first ever to do so in the province was the University of Northern Philippines); the first to open hiking trails; and the first municipality in Ilocos Sur to hold a National Shootfest.

== Geography ==
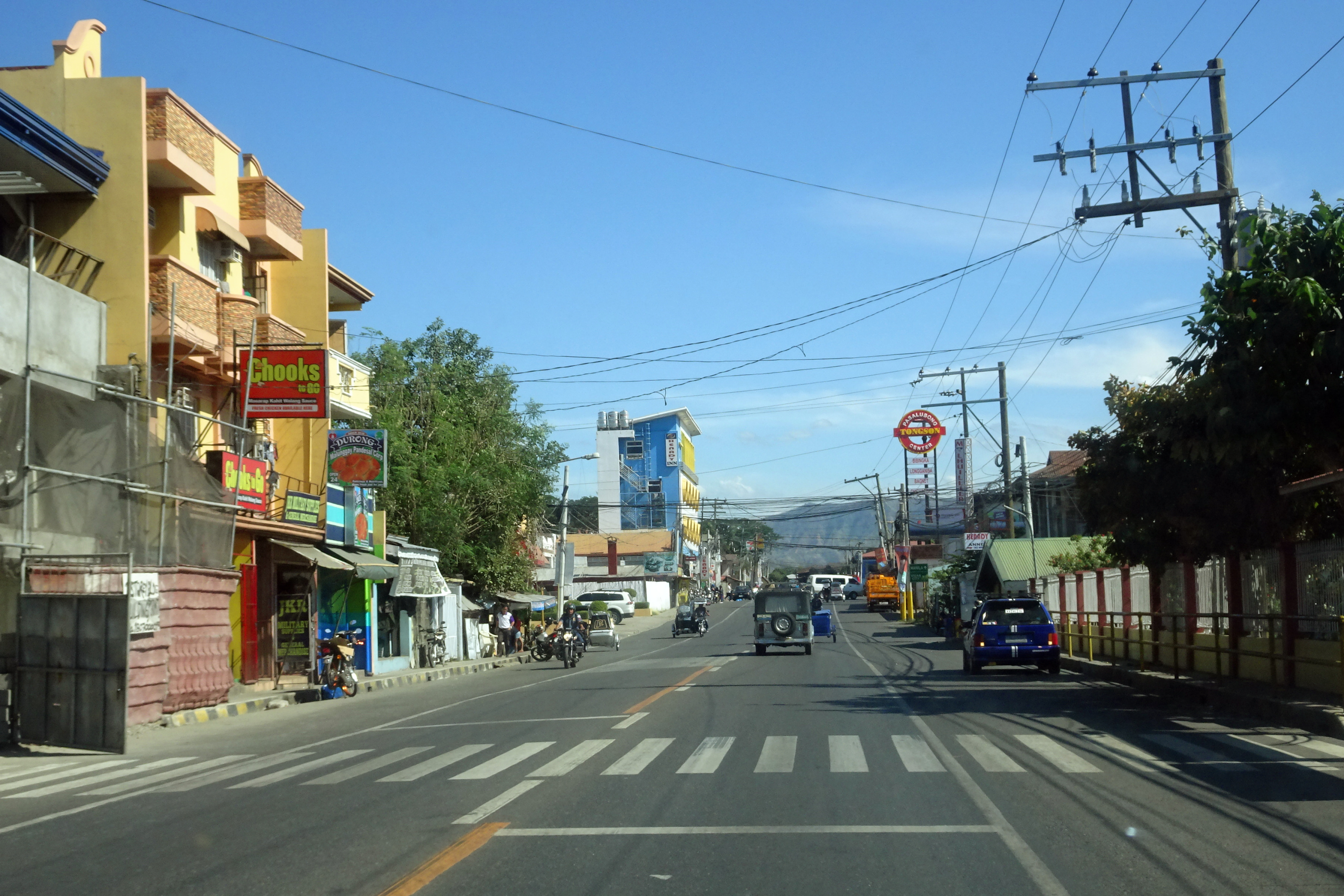
Poblacion of Bantay

The Municipality of Bantay is bordered by the municipalities of San Vicente, San Ildefonso, Santo Domingo, Magsingal, Santa and the city of Vigan.

It has an average elevation of 100 meters (328.08 feet), with a land area of 7,660 hectares (18,900 acres). It is an elevated and hilly municipality but some barangays, especially those near creeks, are prone to flooding during heavy typhoons.

Bantay is situated 1.46 kilometres (0.91 mi) from the provincial capital Vigan, and 403.42 kilometres (250.67 mi) from the country's capital city of Manila.

=== Barangays ===
Bantay is politically subdivided into 34 barangays. Each barangay consists of puroks and some have sitios.

- Aggay
- An-annam
- Balaleng
- Banaoang
- Barangay 1 (Poblacion)
- Barangay 2 (Poblacion)
- Barangay 3 (Poblacion)
- Barangay 4 (Poblacion)
- Barangay 5 (Poblacion)
- Barangay 6 (Poblacion)
- Bulag
- Buquig
- Cabalanggan
- Cabaroan
- Cabusligan
- Capangdanan
- Guimod
- Lingsat
- Malingeb
- Mira
- Naguiddayan
- Ora
- Paing
- Puspus
- Quimmarayan
- Sagneb
- Sagpat
- San Isidro
- San Julian
- San Mariano (formerly Sallacong)
- Sinabaan
- Taguiporo
- Taleb
- Tay-ac

=== Climate ===
Climate data for Bantay, Ilocos Sur
Month	Jan	Feb	Mar	Apr	May	Jun	Jul	Aug	Sep	Oct	Nov	Dec	Year
Mean daily maximum °C (°F)	30 (86)	31 (88)	32 (90)	34 (93)	33 (91)	31 (88)	30 (86)	30 (86)	30 (86)	31 (88)	30 (86)	29 (84)	31 (88)
Mean daily minimum °C (°F)	19 (66)	19 (66)	21 (70)	23 (73)	24 (75)	25 (77)	24 (75)	24 (75)	24 (75)	22 (72)	21 (70)	19 (66)	22 (72)
Average precipitation mm (inches)	9 (0.4)	11 (0.4)	13 (0.5)	23 (0.9)	92 (3.6)	122 (4.8)	153 (6.0)	137 (5.4)	139 (5.5)	141 (5.6)	42 (1.7)	14 (0.6)	896 (35.4)
Average rainy days	4.6	4.0	6.2	9.1	19.5	23.2	24.0	22.5	21.5	15.2	10.5	6.0	166.3
Source: Meteoblue (modeled/calculated data, not measured locally)

=== Flora and fauna ===
Bantay's reserved forests and farms make it home to a diverse range of plants, animals, and river creatures. Around more than 60 species can be found in Bantay including over 9 mammal, reptile (including monitor lizards), and amphibian species; 10 bird and fish species; several insects and plants are existing in the farms and wild.

Typical of places all over the Philippines, cattle and water buffalo are domesticated. Herons are often sighted in rice paddies, and beetles (especially the "aros-aros" and the "abal-abal") and crickets come seasonally. Mudfish, carp, the Abra River eel, and other fish abound in its rivers and creeks, most of which are also seasonal. Monkeys, wild boar, and wild chickens can be seen in the mountains, but not as plentiful as before.

Spanish plum trees (known locally as "sarguelas") abound in the municipality, especially in Barangays Paing and Banaoang. Valuable lumber trees such as mahogany and molave abound in its mountains, especially in Caniao. Bamboo also abound in the municipality, especially the "bayug," "bikal," and "bulo" ("buho") varieties.

== Demographics ==
Population census of Bantay

Year	Pop.	±% p.a.
1903	7,020	—
1918	9,573	+2.09%
1939	12,105	+1.12%
1948	12,714	+0.55%
1960	15,833	+1.84%
1970	19,164	+1.93%

Year	Pop.	±% p.a.
1975	20,666	+1.52%
1980	22,282	+1.52%
1990	26,024	+1.56%
1995	28,128	+1.47%
2000	30,519	+1.76%
2007	33,174	+1.16%

Year	Pop.	±% p.a.
2010	34,323	+1.25%
2015	35,731	+0.77%
2020	37,118	+0.80%
2024	37,088	−0.02%

Source: Philippine Statistics Authority

In the 2024 census, Bantay had a population of 37,088 people. The population density was 480 inhabitants per square kilometre (1,200/sq mi).

=== Religion ===
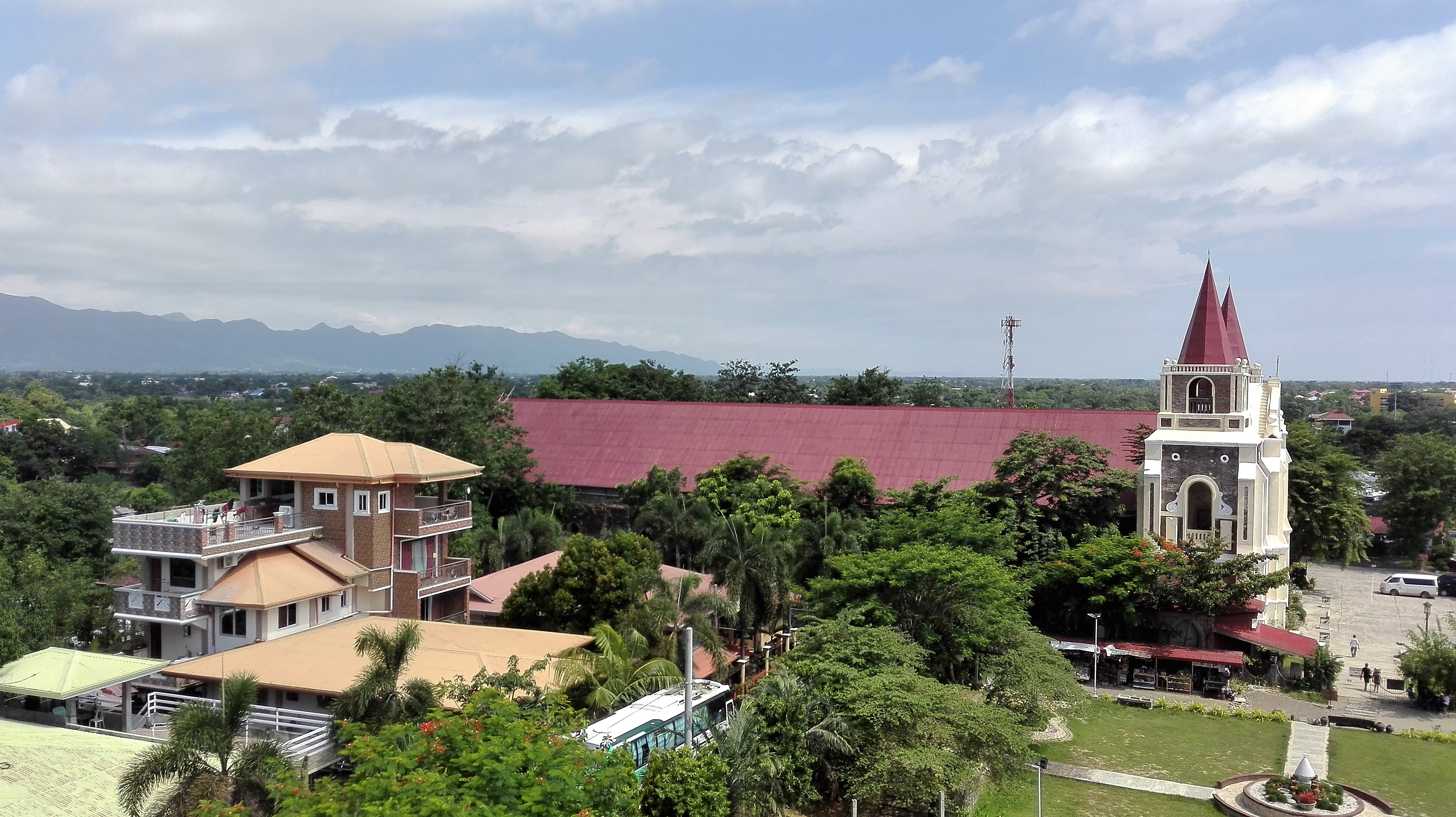
St Augustine Church, one of two parochial churches in Bantay (the other being in Barangay Paing).

About 94% of the total inhabitants are Christians, while the remaining 6% are Muslims or belong to other major religions/sects.

In the total population of Christian Bantayenos, Roman Catholics are 99%. Since it was occupied by Spaniards during the Early Colonial Period.

=== Language ===
Since the Ilocano language is the mother tongue of the Ilocanos, most of the Bantayeños especially the Muslims and Indians speak it alongside Tagalog. However, in schools and during Legislative Sessions (by the Sangguniang Bayan), they are required to speak English.

- Ilocano - 97%
- Tagalog - 2%
- English - 1%

== Economy ==
Poverty incidence of Bantay (%)

Source: Philippine Statistics Authority

Bantay's main economic sectors are agriculture and commerce. Crop production and livestock raising form the agricultural activities of Bantay. Small retail shops and food enterprises are also present in Bantay.

== Government ==
=== Local government ===
Bantay, belonging to the first congressional district of the province of Ilocos Sur, is governed by a mayor designated as its local chief executive and by a municipal council as its legislative body in accordance with the Local Government Code. The mayor, vice mayor, and the councilors are elected directly by the people through an election which is being held every three years.

=== Elected officials ===
For the 2010–2013 term, Samuel C. Parilla was the elected mayor of the town (since 1988–1998; 2007–present), with Floro Jose P. Peredo, Sr. as the vice mayor. The municipality's Sangguniang Bayan members included William Pre, Roberto Reboroso, William Pacpaco, Ireneo Quintinita, Edilberto Mercurio, Nick Pamuspusan, Arnold Paz, and George Leones. Also in the Sangguniang Bayan were ABC President Gloria Ramirez and Sangguniang Kabataan Federated President Jonalyn Pre.

Members of the Municipal Council (2025–2028)

- Congressman: Ronald V. Singson
- Mayor: Samuel C. Parilla
- Vice-Mayor: Samuel Go F. Parilla
- Councilors:
  - William A. Pre
  - Hilario L. Paet
  - Rodrigo F. Paet
  - Lorenzo L. Paiste
  - Arnold C. Paz
  - Pedro R. Cantano Jr.
  - Percival J. Vicencio
  - Hipolito A. Madriaga

== Tourism ==
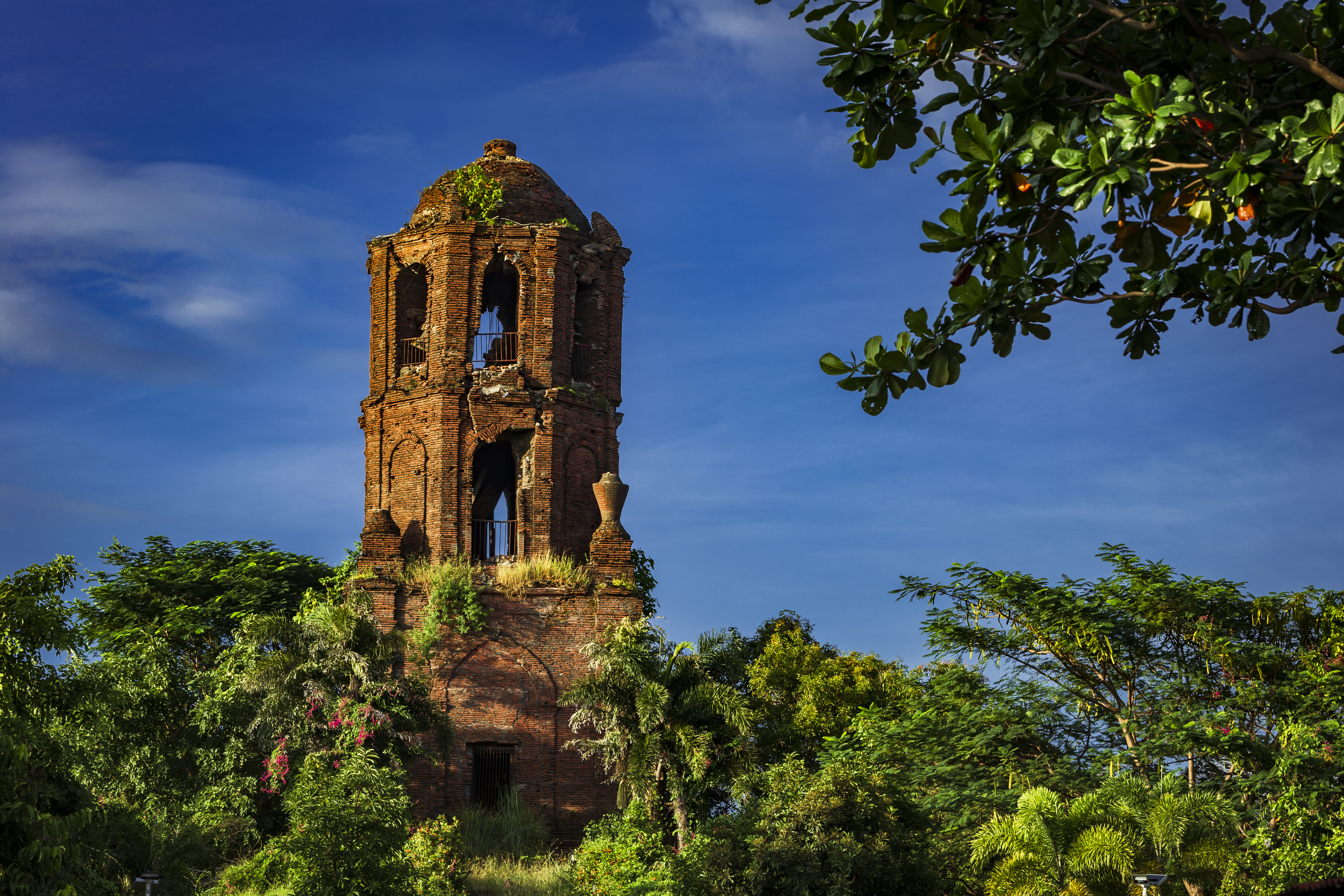
The bell tower was damaged by a 7.3 magnitude earthquake on July 27, 2022

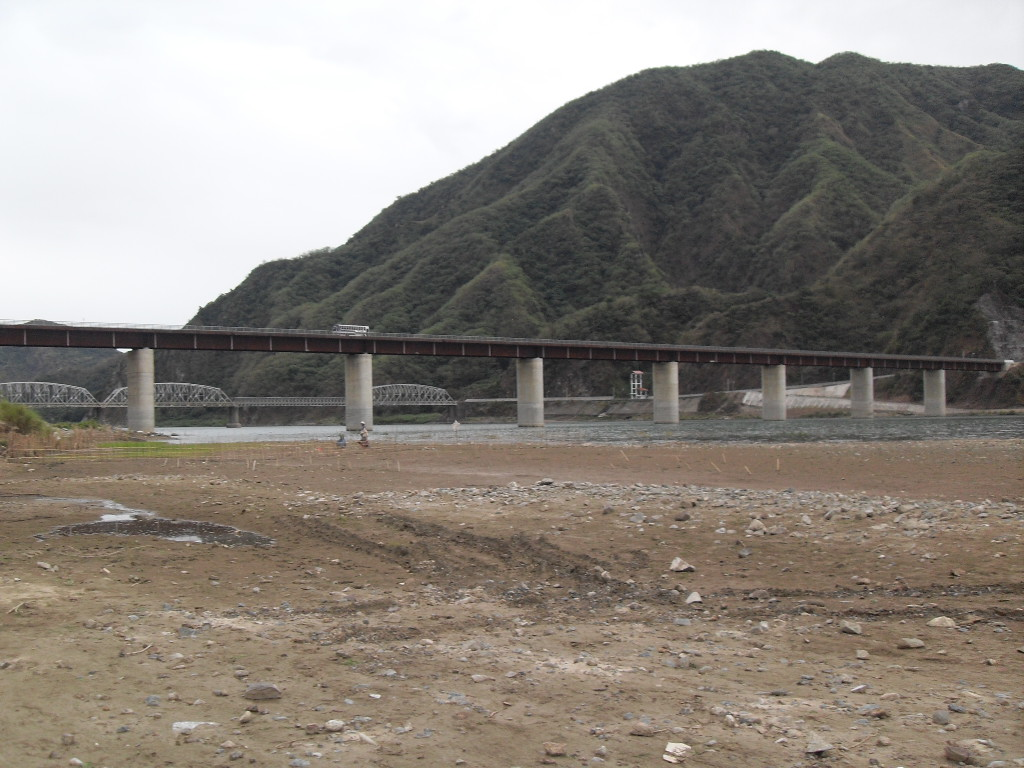
The replacement of the Quirino Bridge above the Abra River between the towns of Santa and Bantay

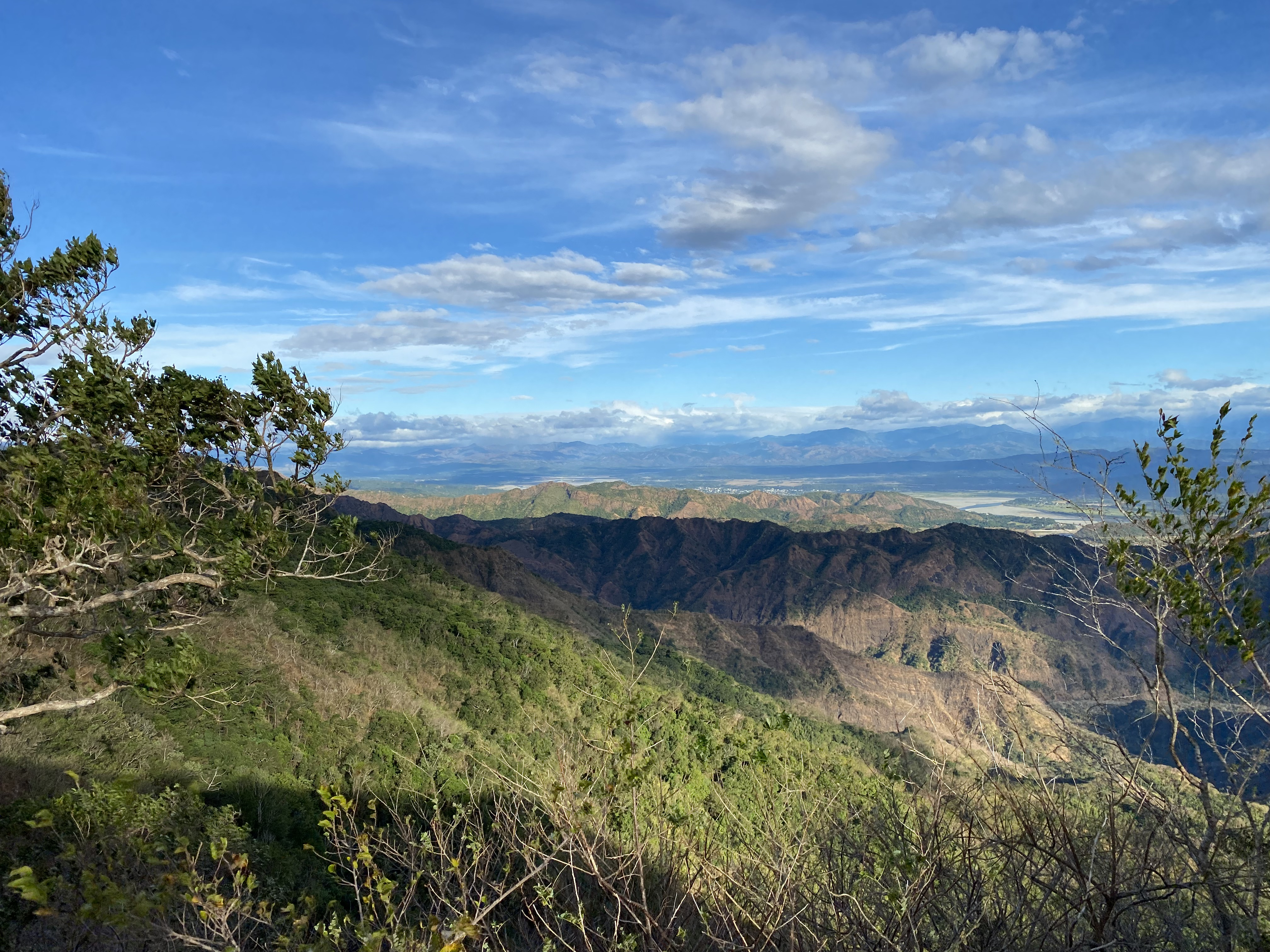
View of the Caraballo Mountains from Caniao Peak

=== Cultural and historical ===
Saint Augustine Parish Church
One of two parishes in the municipality. It serves as the Sanctuary of Nuestra Señora de La Caridad, the Queen of Ilocandia. The church and bell tower are considered to be two of the oldest structures in the province, as the bell tower was built in 1590 and the church was in the following year. The place, especially the bell tower, is a tourist attraction mostly accessed from Vigan by means of horse-drawn carts called "calesas." The bell tower is recognized as a National Cultural Treasure along with several other Spanish colonial-era watchtowers along the Ilocos coastline.

Quirino Bridge
This scenic arch bridge traversing the Abra River is located between two beautiful mountains and is built to honor then-President Elpidio Quirino. It was once partly destroyed by Super Typhoon Feria, hence a different-looking third quarter portion. In December 2007, Chinese engineers and a local construction company started to build a new, 456 meter-long replacement, a stone's throw from the original bridge. It was officially opened by then-President Gloria Macapagal Arroyo on December 30, 2009. The old bridge, an iconic symbol of Ilocos Sur, is currently preserved as a tourist attraction, doubling as a backup in case the main bridge is damaged by typhoons. The old bridge was once again damaged during Super Typhoon Egay on July 24, 2023.

=== Natural ===
Carballo Mountains
The municipality is home to a portion of this mountain range that overlooks the Cagayan Valley and portions of Babuyan Islands, and to which the municipality partly owes its name. The range has two popular mountain peaks, Caniao and Tupira. This is one of the few mountain ranges in Ilocos Sur and the only natural tourist spot of Bantay aside from the Abra River. It has forests and crystal-clear springs, which also supplies drinking water to most of Metro Vigan. It is a destination of the Philippine Army and habitat of unique species like wild pigs and monkeys. Today it is a location of firing ranges, some telecommunications relay facilities (often mistaken by locals as a radar array), and hiking trails. It also houses the headquarters and nursery for a reforestation project conducted by the Department of Environment and Natural Resources.

== Education ==
The Bantay Schools District Office governs all public and private schools within the municipality. These include from elementary to high schools both public and private.

Bantay West Integrated School

=== Primary and elementary schools ===
- Balaleng Elementary School
- Banaoang Elementary School
- Bantay East Central School
- Bantay West Central School
- Bulag Elementary School
- Cabusligan-Quimmarayan Elementary School
- Capangdanan Elementary School
- Great Heights Learning Center (Elementary)
- Guimod Elementary School
- Jenefa Scholastica (Elementary)
- Lingsat Elementary School
- Malingeb Elementary School
- Ora East Elementary School
- Ora West Elementary School
- Paing Elementary School
- Sallacong Elementary School
- San Julian Elementary School
- Silang Elementary School
- Taguiporo Elementary School
- Tay-ac Elementary School

=== Secondary schools ===
- Bantay National High School
- Great Heights Learning Center
- Jenefa Scholastica
- Tay-ac National High School

=== Higher educational institutions ===
There are two major educational institutions in Bantay:

- Ilocos Sur Community College (ISCC) - A college being operated by the provincial government, with its campus located near Quirino Stadium. The college was founded in 1975.
- St. Paul College of Ilocos Sur (formerly Rosary College) - The oldest privately funded school in Ilocos Sur, founded as an all-girls' educational institution by the Sisters of Saint Paul of Chartres in Vigan. Its former campus near the Vigan Cathedral is now the site of a shopping mall, having recently fully transferred to nearby Bantay. It has recently joined the Saint Paul University System.
