= 2018 Global Cebu F.C. season =

Global Cebu
2018 season
- Head coach: Marjo Allado (until 4 August); Dragutin Stević-Ranković (from 18 August)
- Stadium: Rizal Memorial Stadium
- PFL: 6th
- AFC Cup: Group Stage
- Copa Paulino Alcantara: Group Stage (TBA)
- Top goalscorer: League: Darryl Roberts (2); All: Darryl Roberts (4)
Home colours	Away colours
- All statistics correct as of 9 August 2018.

The 2018 season was Global Cebu's 2nd season in the Philippines Football League (PFL), the top flight of Philippine football. In addition to the PFL, the club also competed in the Copa Paulino Alcantara. The club finished last in the PFL, winning only once in their 25 matches. The club also forfeited five matches.

== Preseason and friendlies ==
Win Draw Loss

=== Friendlies ===
23 January 2018	Global Cebu (Philippines)	5–1	(Malaysia) Sabah FA	Carmona
	Sánchez 29', 90+1', 90+2'; Dizon 67'; Balang 84' (o.g.)	Report	Heo Jae-nyeong 4'	Stadium: PFF National Training Centre

1 February 2018	Global Cebu (Philippines)	0–1	(Philippines) JPV Marikina	Taguig
		Report	Poderoso	Stadium: McKinley Hill Stadium

== Competitions ==
=== Overview ===
Competition	First match	Last match	Starting round	Final position	Record							
Competition	First match	Last match	Starting round	Final position	Pld	W	D	L	GF	GA	GD	Win %
PFL	3 March 2018	25 August 2018	Matchday 1	6th	25	1	2	22	18	85	−67	4.00
Copa Paulino Alcantara	1 September 2018	26 September 2018	Group stage	Group stage	4	0	1	3	7	13	−6	0.00
AFC Cup	10 February 2018	25 April 2018	Group stage	Group stage	6	2	2	2	9	10	−1	33.33
Total					35	3	5	27	34	108	−74	8.57

Last updated: 27 March 2019
Source: Competitions

=== Philippines Football League ===
Pos	Team	Pld	W	D	L	GF	GA	GD	Pts	Qualification or relegation
1	Ceres–Negros (C)	25	19	3	3	66	25	+41	60	Qualification for the AFC Champions League Preliminary Round 1 or AFC Cup Group Stage
2	Kaya–Iloilo	25	15	4	6	58	32	+26	49	
3	Davao Aguilas	25	11	6	8	52	39	+13	39	
4	Stallion Laguna	25	12	3	10	49	45	+4	36 (Note: Three points were deducted from Stallion Laguna due to the club's failure to comply with Liga Futbol Inc. Disciplinary Committee’s Decision No. 010318DC03.)	
5	JPV Marikina	25	7	2	16	46	63	−17	20 (Note: Three points were deducted from JPV Marikina due to the club's failure to comply with Liga Futbol Inc. Disciplinary Committee’s Decision No. 010318DC02.)	
6	Global Cebu	25	1	2	22	18	85	−67	5	

Source: Philippines Football League
Rules for classification: 1) Points; 2) Goal Difference; 3) Goals Scored
(C) Champions

==== Results summary ====
Overall								Home						Away					
Pld	W	D	L	GF	GA	GD	Pts	W	D	L	GF	GA	GD	W	D	L	GF	GA	GD
25	1	2	22	18	85	−67	5	1	1	10	13	39	−26	0	1	12	5	46	−41

Last updated: 25 August 2018.
Source: Philippines Football League

==== Result round by round ====
Round	1	2	3	4	5	6	7	8	9	10	11	12	13	14	15	16	17	18	19	20	21	22	23	24	25
Ground	A	H	H	H	H	H	H	A	A	H	A	A	A	A	H	H	H	A	A	H	A	A	A	A	H
Result	L	L	D	L	L	W	L	L	L	L	L	D	L	L	L	L	L	L	L	L	L	L	L	L	L
Position	5	6	5	6	6	6	6	6	6	6	6	6	6	6	6	6	6	6	6	6	6	6	6	6	6

Updated to match(es) played on 25 August 2018. Source: Philippines Football League
A = Away; H = Home; W = Win; D = Draw; L = Loss

==== Regular season ====
3 March 2018 1	JPV Marikina	2–1	Global Cebu	Marikina
19:00 UTC+8	Moriyasu 13'; Kozawa 75'	Report	del Rosario 89'	Stadium: Marikina Sports Complex; Attendance: 423

4 April 2018 2	Global Cebu	1–2	Stallion Laguna	Biñan^{a}
16:00 UTC+8	Roberts 60'	Report	Arboleda 56'; Polli 78'	Stadium: Biñan Football Stadium

15 April 2018 3	Global Cebu	2–2	Davao Aguilas	Biñan^{b}
16:00 UTC+8	Roberts 66'; Wesley 89'		P. Younghusband 20'; Sawyer 43'	Stadium: Biñan Football Stadium

18 April 2018 4	Global Cebu	0–2	Ceres–Negros	Manila^{b}
19:00 UTC+8		Report	Mi. Ott 13'; Schröck 45+1'	Stadium: Rizal Memorial Stadium

29 April 2018 5	Global Cebu	0–3	Davao Aguilas	Manila^{b}
19:00 UTC+8			P. Younghusband 17' (pen.); J. Younghusband 51', 65'	Stadium: Rizal Memorial Stadium

23 May 2018 6	Global Cebu	3–1	Kaya–Iloilo	Biñan^{b}
16:00 UTC+8				Stadium: Biñan Football Stadium

27 May 2018 7	Global Cebu	1–3	JPV Marikina	Biñan^{b}
16:00 UTC+8				Stadium: Biñan Football Stadium

1 June 2018 8	Kaya–Iloilo	3–0^{c} Awarded	Global Cebu	Iloilo City
				Stadium: Iloilo Sports Complex

10 June 2018 9	Stallion Laguna	2–1	Global Cebu	Biñan
16:00 UTC+8				Stadium: Biñan Football Stadium

16 June 2018 10	Global Cebu	3–4	Ceres–Negros	Manila^{b}
19:00 UTC+8				Stadium: Rizal Memorial Stadium

20 June 2018 11	Stallion Laguna	4–0	Global Cebu	Biñan
15:00 UTC+8				Stadium: Biñan Football Stadium

18 July 2018 12	Davao Aguilas	1–1	Global Cebu	Manila^{d}
15:00 UTC+8				Stadium: Rizal Memorial Stadium

21 July 2018 13	Ceres–Negros	7–1	Global Cebu	Manila^{e}
19:30 UTC+8				Stadium: Rizal Memorial Stadium

25 July 2018 14	Ceres–Negros	6–1	Global Cebu	Manila^{e}
19:00 UTC+8				Stadium: Rizal Memorial Stadium

29 July 2018 15	Global Cebu	1–5	JPV Marikina	Carmona^{b}
15:00 UTC+8				Stadium: PFF National Training Center

1 August 2018 16	Global Cebu	1–11	JPV Marikina	Carmona^{b}
15:00 UTC+8				Stadium: PFF National Training Center

4 August 2018 17	Global Cebu	1–2	Stallion Laguna	Carmona^{b}
15:00 UTC+8				Stadium: PFF National Training Center

8 August 2018 18	Kaya–Iloilo	4–0	Global Cebu	Carmona^{f}
15:00 UTC+8				Stadium: PFF National Training Center

9 August 2018 19	Davao Aguilas	3–0^{g} Awarded	Global Cebu	Tagum
				Stadium: Davao Del Norte Sports Complex

9 August 2018 20	Global Cebu	0–3^{h} Awarded	Stallion Laguna	Biñan^{b}
				Stadium: Biñan Football Stadium

9 August 2018 21	JPV Marikina	3–0^{i} Awarded	Global Cebu	Marikina
				Stadium: Marikina Sports Complex

11 August 2018 22	Kaya–Iloilo	6–0	Global Cebu	Iloilo City
15:00 UTC+8				Stadium: Iloilo Sports Complex

18 August 2018 23	Davao Aguilas	2–0	Global Cebu	Manila^{d}
15:00 UTC+8				Stadium: Rizal Memorial Stadium

24 August 2018 24	Ceres–Negros	3–0^{j} Awarded	Global Cebu	Bacolod
				Stadium: Panaad Park and Stadium

25 August 2018 25	Global Cebu	0–1	Kaya–Iloilo	Manila^{b}
16:00 UTC+8			Bedic 86'	Stadium: Rizal Memorial Stadium

Note:

a Due to the unavailability of Cebu City Sports Complex, the match will be played in away venue Biñan Football Stadium.
b Due to the bad condition of the pitch in the Cebu City Sports Complex, the match will be played in neutral venue Rizal Memorial Stadium, Biñan Football Stadium or PFF National Training Centre.
c Originally schedule on 2 May but the match was abandoned by Global Cebu. Kaya-Iloilo won 3–0 by default.
d Due to the unavailability of Davao del Norte Sports Complex, the match will be played in neutral venue Rizal Memorial Stadium.
e Due to the unavailability of Panaad Park and Stadium, the match will be played in neutral venue Rizal Memorial Stadium.
f Due to the unavailability of Iloilo Sports Complex, the match will be played in neutral venue PFF National Training Centre.
g Originally schedule on 3 July but the match was abandoned by Global Cebu. Davao Aguilas won 3–0 by default.
h Originally schedule on 8 July but the match was abandoned by Global Cebu. Stallion Laguna won 3–0 by default.
i Originally schedule on 11 July but the match was abandoned by Global Cebu. JPV Marikina won 3–0 by default.
j Originally schedule on 15 August but the match was abandoned by Global Cebu. Ceres–Negros won 3–0 by default.

=== Copa Paulino Alcantara ===
Pos	Team	Pld	W	D	L	GF	GA	GD	Pts	Qualification	KAY	JPV	GLO
1	Kaya–Iloilo	4	3	1	0	9	3	+6	10	Semi-finals	—	1–0	4–0
2	JPV Marikina	4	2	0	2	6	6	0	6	Semi-finals	0–1	—	4–3
3	Global Cebu	4	0	1	3	7	13	−6	1		3–3	1–2	—

Source: LFI

==== Group stage ====
1 September 2018 1	Kaya–Iloilo	4–0	Global Cebu	Manila^{a}
16:00 UTC+8	Lopez Mendy 23', 55', 62'; Tanton 49'			Stadium: Rizal Memorial Stadium

15 September 2018 2	JPV Marikina	4–3	Global Cebu	Carmona^{b}
15:00 UTC+8	Moriyasu 28'; Uzoka 57'; Angeles 69'; Shimono 73'		Nikolić 38'; Roberts 65'; Lee Jeong-min 85'	Stadium: PFF National Training Centre

23 September 2018 3	Global Cebu	3–3	Kaya–Iloilo	Manila^{c}
19:00 UTC+8	Beloya 3'; Beaton 56'; Jarvis 63'		Tanton 24'; Lopez Mendy 58', 73'	Stadium: Rizal Memorial Stadium

26 September 2018 4	Global Cebu	1–2	JPV Marikina	Manila^{c}
19:00 UTC+8	Jarvis 77'		Uzoka 39'; Moriyasu 62'	Stadium: Rizal Memorial Stadium

Note:

a Due to the unavailability of Iloilo Sports Complex, the match will be played in neutral venue Rizal Memorial Stadium.
b Due to the unavailability of Marikina Sports Complex, the match will be played in neutral venue PFF National Training Centre.
c Due to the unavailability of Cebu City Sports Complex, the match will be played in neutral venue Rizal Memorial Stadium.

=== AFC Cup ===
==== Group stage ====
Pos	Team	Pld	W	D	L	GF	GA	GD	Pts	Qualification	YAN	GLO	THA	BAL
1	(Myanmar) Yangon United	6	4	1	1	15	9	+6	13	Zonal semi-finals	—	3–0	2–1	3–2
2	(Philippines) Global Cebu	6	2	2	2	9	10	−1	8		2–1	—	3–3	1–1
3	(Vietnam) FLC Thanh Hóa	6	1	3	2	9	11	−2	6		3–3	1–0	—	0–0
4	(Indonesia) Bali United	6	1	2	3	8	11	−3	5		1–3	1–3	3–1	—

Source: AFC
Rules for classification: Group stage tiebreakers

13 February 2018 Matchday 1	FLC Thanh Hóa (Vietnam)	1–0	(Philippines) Global Cebu	Hanoi
16:30 UTC+7	Faye 74'	Report		Stadium: Mỹ Đình National Stadium; Attendance: 4,566; Referee: Chen Hsin-chuan (Chinese Taipei)

27 February 2018 Matchday 2	Global Cebu (Philippines)	1–1	(Indonesia) Bali United	Manila
19:30 UTC+8	Dizon 11'	Report	Spasojević 74'	Stadium: Rizal Memorial Stadium; Attendance: 365; Referee: Suhaizi Shukri (Malaysia)

7 March 2018 Matchday 3	Yangon United (Myanmar)	3–0	(Philippines) Global Cebu	Yangon
15:30 UTC+6:30	Maung Lwin 45+3'; Sylla 48', 57'	Report		Stadium: Thuwunna Stadium; Attendance: 815; Referee: Omar Al-Yaqoubi (Oman)

13 March 2018 Matchday 4	Global Cebu (Philippines)	2–1	(Myanmar) Yangon United	Manila
19:30 UTC+8	Roberts 79'; Sánchez 90+5' (pen.)	Report	Lwin 90'	Stadium: Rizal Memorial Stadium; Attendance: 150; Referee: Takuto Okabe (Japan)

11 April 2018 Matchday 5	Global Cebu (Philippines)	3–3	(Vietnam) FLC Thanh Hóa	Manila
--:-- UTC+8	Sánchez 6' dos Santos 82'; Roberts 90'	Report	Ofere 2'; Le Thanh 25'; Hoàng Đình 57'	Stadium: Rizal Memorial Stadium; Attendance: 287; Referee: Ahmad A'Qashah (Singapore)

25 April 2018 Matchday 6	Bali United (Indonesia)	1–3	(Philippines) Global Cebu	Bali
--:-- UTC+6:30	van der Velden 71'	Report	Rufo 2', 45+1'; Mulders 33'	Stadium: Kapten I Wayan Dipta Stadium; Attendance: 2,154; Referee: Lau Fong Hei (Hong Kong)

==== Ranking of second-placed teams ====
Pos	Grp	Team	Pld	W	D	L	GF	GA	GD	Pts	Qualification
1	F	(Philippines) Ceres–Negros	6	4	1	1	17	3	+14	13	Zonal semi-finals
2	H	(Vietnam) Sông Lam Nghệ An	6	3	1	2	8	5	+3	10	
3	G	(Philippines) Global Cebu	6	2	2	2	9	10	−1	8	

Source: AFC

== Squad ==
=== League squad ===
As of 21 Jul 2018.

Squad No.	Name	Nationality	Position(s)	Date of birth (Age)	Previous club
Goalkeepers
21	Rowell Bayan	(Philippines)	GK		
26	Paul Reyes	(Philippines)	GK		
Defenders
4	Lee Jeong-Min	(South Korea)	DF		
7	Alvin Sarmiento	(Philippines)	DF		
11	Dominic del Rosario	(Philippines)	DF	14 November 1996 (age 21)	(Philippines) Ilocos United
12	Jordan Jarvis	(Philippines)	DF		(Philippines) Davao Aguilas
23	Darryl Regala	(Philippines)	DF		
27	Marco Casambre	(Philippines)	DF	28 August 1998 (age 27)	(Philippines) Ceres–Negros
Midfielder
2	Ronnie Aguisanda	(Philippines)	MF	21 January 1991 (age 34)	(Philippines) Green Archers United FC
6	Fritz Brigoli	(Philippines)	MF	30 January 1998 (age 27)	
8	Charlie Beaton	(Philippines)	MF		
16	John Roy Melgo	(Philippines)	MF		
17	OJ Clarino	(Philippines)	MF	27 July 1990 (age 35)	(Philippines) Stallion Laguna FC
19	Paolo Salenga	(Philippines)	MF	17 December 1994 (age 30)	(Philippines) Pachanga Diliman
24	Angelo Marasigan	(Philippines)	MF		
25	Marvin Angeles	(Philippines)	MF	12 February 1991 (age 34)	(Australia) Blacktown Spartans
28	Daniel Gadia	(Philippines)	MF	3 July 1995 (age 30)	(Philippines) Meralco Manila
30	Christian Villegas	(Philippines)	MF		
Strikers
10	Darryl Roberts	(Trinidad and Tobago)	FW	26 September 1983 (age 42)	(Thailand) Ubon UMT United
18	Gerardo Valmayor III	(Philippines)	FW	8 June 1992 (age 33)	(Philippines) Loyola Meralco
26	Nessi Ramos	(Philippines)	FW	23 August 1996 (age 29)	(Philippines) Ceres–Negros

== Transfer ==
=== Preseason transfer ===
==== In ====
Position	Player	Transferred From
MF	(Philippines) (Australia) Jordan Jarvis	(Philippines) Davao Aguilas
FW	(Philippines) Gerardo Valmayor	(Philippines) FC Meralco Manila
GK	(Philippines) Florencio Badelic	(Philippines) FC Meralco Manila
MF	(Philippines) Daniel Gadia	(Philippines) FC Meralco Manila
FW	(Philippines) Curt Dizon	(Philippines) FC Meralco Manila
DF	(South Korea) Lee Jeong-min	(Philippines) FC Meralco Manila
FW	(Philippines) (Nigeria) Chima Uzoka	(Philippines) Ilocos United

==== Out ====
Position	Player	Transferred To
FW	(Philippines) (Japan) Hikaru Minegishi	(Thailand) Pattaya United F.C.
MF	(Philippines) (Iran) Misagh Bahadoran	(Malaysia) Kelantan FA
MF	(Japan) Yu Hoshide	TBA
MF	(Philippines) Amani Aguinaldo	(Philippines) Ceres-Negros
MF	(Philippines) (Italy) Dennis Villanueva	(Philippines) Davao Aguilas
MF	(Japan) Shu Sasaki	Hong Kong Rangers

=== Mid-season transfer ===
==== In ====
Position	Player	Transferred From
GK	(Philippines) Louie Michael Casas	(Philippines) Ceres–Negros
FW	(Serbia) Milan Nikolić	(France) Tarbes Pyrénées
FW	(Philippines) Nessi Ramos	(Philippines) Ceres–Negros

==== Out ====
Position	Player	Transferred To
FW	(Spain) Rufo Sanchez	TBA
DF	(Brazil) Wesley dos Santos	(Philippines) Davao Aguilas
GK	(Philippines) Patrick Deyto	(Philippines) Davao Aguilas
DF	(Philippines) Jerry Barbaso	(Philippines) Ceres-Negros
FW	(Philippines) Curt Dizon	(Philippines) Ceres-Negros
MF	(Philippines) (Netherlands) Paul Mulders	(Philippines) Ceres-Negros
MF	(Philippines) Paolo Bugas	(Philippines) Stallion Laguna
