= 2017 Global Cebu F.C. season =

Global Cebu
2017 season
- Chairman: Dan Palami
- Head coach: Marjo Allado
- Stadium: Cebu City Sports Complex
- PFL: 4th (Regular Season); 2nd (Final Series)
- AFC Cup: Zone Semifinal
- Singapore Cup: Runner-up
Home colours	Away colours
- All statistics correct as of 16 December 2017.

The 2017 season is Global Cebu's 2nd season in the top flight of Philippines football.

== Competitions ==
=== Overview ===
Competition	First match	Last match	Starting round	Final position	Record							
Competition	First match	Last match	Starting round	Final position	Pld	W	D	L	GF	GA	GD	Win %
PFL	6 May 2017	16 December 2017	Matchday 1	4th (League Table) / 2nd (Final Series)	31	14	9	8	51	43	+8	45.16
AFC Champions League	24 January 2017	31 January 2017	Preliminary Round 1	Preliminary Round 2	2	1	0	1	2	6	−4	50.00
AFC Cup	21 February 2017	30 May 2017	Group Stage	Zonal Semifinal	8	5	1	2	15	12	+3	62.50
Singapore Cup	21 June 2017	25 November 2017	Preliminary Round	Runner-up	6	2	3	1	14	12	+2	33.33
Total					47	22	13	12	82	73	+9	46.81

Last updated: 16 December 2017
Source: Competitions

=== Philippines Football League ===
Pos	Team	Pld	W	D	L	GF	GA	GD	Pts	Qualification or relegation
1	Meralco Manila	28	17	7	4	43	33	+10	58	Qualification for finals series
2	Ceres–Negros (C)	28	17	6	5	76	27	+49	57	Qualification for finals series
3	Kaya FC–Makati	28	14	5	9	52	35	+17	47	Qualification for finals series
4	Global Cebu	28	13	8	7	47	37	+10	47	Qualification for finals series
5	Stallion Laguna	28	9	8	11	39	49	−10	35	
6	JPV Marikina	28	9	6	13	42	48	−6	33	
7	Davao Aguilas	28	4	10	14	35	56	−21	22	
8	Ilocos United	28	1	6	21	24	73	−49	9	

Source: Philippines Football League
Rules for classification: 1) Points; 2) Goal Difference; 3) Goals Scored
(C) Champions

==== Regular season ====
7 May 2017 1	JPV Marikina	1–2	Global Cebu	Biñan^{a}
16:00 UTC+8	Odawara 55'	Report	Aguinaldo 58'; Mulders 61'	Stadium: Biñan Football Stadium

21 May 2017 2	Stallion Laguna	1–1	Global Cebu	Biñan
16:00 UTC+8	Nierras 90+3'	Report	Sasaki 84'	Stadium: Biñan Football Stadium

24 May 2017 3	Global Cebu	3–1	Kaya FC–Makati	Manila^{b}
19:00 UTC+8	Villanueva 4'; Sylla 16, 89'	Report	Mendy 54'	Stadium: Rizal Memorial Stadium

3 June 2017 4	Ceres–Negros	1–0	Global Cebu	Bacolod
16:00 UTC+8	Christiaens 83'	Report		Stadium: Panaad Stadium

18 June 2017 5	Ilocos United	0–3	Global Cebu	Bantay^{c}
19:00 UTC+8			Mulders 24' (pen.); Sasaki 24', 32'	Stadium: Quirino Stadium

25 June 2017 6	Global Cebu	1–2	JPV Marikina	Manila^{b}
19:00 UTC+8	Sylla 69'		Odawara 25, 55'	Stadium: Rizal Memorial Stadium

28 June 2017 7	Davao Aguilas	1–2	Global Cebu	Tagum
16:00 UTC+8	Talaroc 60'		37', own goal' Sylla 60'	Stadium: Davao del Norte Sports Complex

2 July 2017 8	Kaya FC–Makati	2–2	Global Cebu	Makati
16:00 UTC+8	Mintah 46'; Mendy 89'		Sasaki 27'; Sylla 90'	Stadium: University of Makati Stadium

5 July 2017 9	Global Cebu	1–0	Ceres–Negros	Cebu City
19:00 UTC+8	Hartmann 43'			Stadium: Cebu City Sports Complex

9 July 2017 10	Global Cebu	3–0	Stallion Laguna	Cebu City
19:00 UTC+8	Bahadoran 49', 67'; Sasaki 86'			Stadium: Cebu City Sports Complex

15 July 2017 11	Global Cebu	0–0	Davao Aguilas	Cebu City
16:00 UTC+8				Stadium: Cebu City Sports Complex

22 July 2017 12	Meralco Manila	2–2	Global Cebu	Manila
16:00 UTC+8				Stadium: Rizal Memorial Stadium

2 August 2017 13	Meralco Manila	1–2	Global Cebu	Manila
16:00 UTC+8				Stadium: Rizal Memorial Stadium

6 August 2017 14	Global Cebu	2–1	Ilocos United	Cebu City
16:00 UTC+8				Stadium: Cebu City Sports Complex

13 August 2017 15	JPV Marikina	5–2	Global Cebu	Manila^{a}
16:00 UTC+8	Uesato 2', 13', 18', 35'; Odawara 34'		Sanchez 63'; Villanueva 82'	Stadium: Rizal Memorial Stadium

19 August 2017 16	Global Cebu	0–0	Kaya FC–Makati	Cebu City
19:00 UTC+8				Stadium: Cebu City Sports Complex

25 August 2017 17	Stallion Laguna	2–1	Global Cebu	Biñan
16:00 UTC+8	Linatoc 60'; Melliza 86'		Sánchez 90+1'	Stadium: Biñan Football Stadium

9 September 2017 18	Davao Aguilas	2–2	Global Cebu	Tagum
16:00 UTC+8				Stadium: Davao del Norte Sports Complex

13 September 2017 19	Global Cebu	3–1	Davao Aguilas	Cebu City
16:00 UTC+8				Stadium: Cebu City Sports Complex

16 September 2017 20	Global Cebu	0–0	Meralco Manila	Cebu City
16:00 UTC+8				Stadium: Cebu City Sports Complex

24 September 2017 21	Ceres–Negros	1–0	Global Cebu	Bacolod
16:00 UTC+8	Schröck 79'			Stadium: Panaad Stadium

15 October 2017 22	Global Cebu	2–1	JPV Marikina	Cebu City
19:00 UTC+8				Stadium: Cebu City Sports Complex

21 October 2017 23	Kaya FC–Makati	2–0	Global Cebu	Makati
16:00 UTC+8				Stadium: University of Makati Stadium

29 October 2017 24	Global Cebu	3–2	Ilocos United	Cebu City
19:00 UTC+8	Roberts 20', 43'; Wesley 78'		Kouassi 19', 45'

2 November 2017 25	Global Cebu	4–3	Stallion Laguna	Manila^{d}
16:00 UTC+8	Sanchez 30', 49', 90+3'; Wesley 89'		Tuason 12', 68'; Ko 60'	Stadium: Rizal Memorial Stadium

15 November 2017 26	Ilocos United	3–3	Global Cebu	Bantay^{c}
16:00 UTC+8				Stadium: Quirino Stadium

19 November 2017 27	Global Cebu	1–2	Meralco Manila	Cebu City
19:00 UTC+8				Stadium: Cebu City Sports Complex

28 November 2017 28	Global Cebu	2–0	Ceres–Negros	Cebu City
16:00 UTC+8	Sanchez 7'; Bahadoran 33'			Stadium: Cebu City Sports Complex

Note:

- a Because of the ongoing works in the Marikina Sports Complex, the team will play its first few league games at the Biñan Football Stadium and Rizal Memorial Stadium and will have to groundshare with Stallion Laguna and Meralco Manila, respectively.
- b Because of the ongoing works in the Cebu City Sports Complex, the team will play its first few league games at the Rizal Memorial Stadium in Manila and will have to groundshare with Meralco Manila.
- c The home stadium of the club is located in Bantay, Ilocos Sur, a nearby town of Vigan. For administrative and marketing purposes, the home city of Ilocos United is designated as "Vigan"
- d Because of the unavailability of the Cebu City Sports Complex, the match was played instead in Rizal Memorial Stadium, Manila.

==== Final Series ====
2 December 2017 Semifinal Leg 1	Global Cebu	2–1	Meralco Manila	Manila^{1}
19:00 UTC+8	Wesley 90'; Minegishi 90+2'		Minniecon 61' (pen.)	Stadium: Rizal Memorial Stadium

^1 The game is considered as a Home Game for Global Cebu. Game will be played in RMS due to unavailability of Global's home stadium, the Cebu City Sports Complex.

9 December 2017 Semifinal Leg 2	Meralco Manila	1–1 (2–3 agg.)	Global Cebu	Manila
19:00 UTC+8	Dizon 2'		Sanchez 86'	Stadium: Rizal Memorial Stadium

16 December 2017 Final	Ceres–Negros	4–1	Global Cebu	Bacolod
18:00 UTC+8	Marañón 4'; Ramsay 20', 27', 61'	Report	Roberts 89'	Stadium: Panaad Stadium; Attendance: 2,553

=== AFC Champions League ===
==== Preliminary rounds ====
24 January 2017 Preliminary Round 1	Global Cebu (Philippines)	2–0	(Singapore) Tampines Rovers	Manila
19:30 UTC+8	Aguinaldo (yellow card) 39'; Azzawi 61'; Bahadoran 73'	Report	Shakir (yellow card) 45+2'; Yasir (yellow card) 77'; Jufri (yellow card) 77'	Stadium: Rizal Memorial Stadium; Attendance: 1,120; Referee: Liu Kwok Man (Hong Kong)

31 January 2017 Preliminary Round 2	Brisbane Roar (Australia)	6–0	(Philippines) Global Cebu	Brisbane
19:00 UTC+10	Borrello 12', 26', 30', 80'; Arana 35', 65'	Report	Bugas (yellow card) 82'	Stadium: Brisbane Stadium; Attendance: 3,657; Referee: Khamis Al-Marri (Qatar)

=== AFC Cup ===
==== Group stage ====
Pos	Team	Pld	W	D	L	GF	GA	GD	Pts	Qualification	GLO	JDT	BKA	MAG
1	(Philippines) Global Cebu	6	5	0	1	13	9	+4	15	Zonal semi-finals	—	3–2	3–1	1−0
2	(Malaysia) Johor Darul Ta'zim	6	4	1	1	16	5	+11	13	Zonal semi-finals	4–0	—	3–0	3–1
3	(Cambodia) Boeung Ket Angkor	6	1	1	4	3	12	−9	4		0–2	0–3	—	1–0
4	(Myanmar) Magwe	6	0	2	4	5	11	−6	2		2–4	1–1	1–1	—

Source: AFC
Rules for classification: Group stage tiebreakers

21 February 2017 Matchday 1	Global Cebu (Philippines)	1–0	(Myanmar) Magwe	Manila
19:30 UTC+8	Roberts (yellow card) 23'; Bahadoran 39', (yellow card) 45'; Clarino (yellow card) 84'; Wesley (yellow card) 90+4'	Report	Linn (yellow card) 45+1'; Tun (yellow card) 85'	Stadium: Rizal Memorial Stadium; Attendance: 456; Referee: Kim Hee-gon (South Korea)

7 March 2017 Matchday 2	Boeung Ket Angkor (Cambodia)	0–2	(Philippines) Global Cebu	Phnom Penh
18:00 UTC+7	Mizan (yellow card) 39'	Report	Mulders 5', 65' (pen.); Sasaki (yellow card) 53'	Stadium: Olympic Stadium; Attendance: 3,000; Referee: Yu Ming-hsun (Chinese Taipei)

14 March 2017 Matchday 3	Johor Darul Ta'zim (Malaysia)	4–0	(Philippines) Global Cebu	Johor Bahru
20:45 UTC+8	Mahali 30'; Safiq 34' (pen.); Fazly (yellow card) 56'; Ferreira 87'; Amirul (yellow card) 88'; António 90+2'	Report		Stadium: Tan Sri Dato Haji Hassan Yunos Stadium; Attendance: 11,090; Referee: Kim Dae-yong (South Korea)

5 April 2017 Matchday 4	Global Cebu (Philippines)	3–2	(Malaysia) Johor Darul Ta'zim	Manila
19:30 UTC+8	Villanueva 27', (yellow card) 39'; Sasaki 32'; Aguinaldo 35'; Agustien (yellow card) 43'; Hartmann (yellow card) 86'	Report	António (yellow card) 39'; Guerra 49', 83'; Amirul (yellow card) 79'; Chanturu (yellow card) 87' }	Stadium: Rizal Memorial Stadium; Attendance: 458; Referee: Khamis Al-Kuwari (Qatar)

19 April 2017 Matchday 5	Magwe (Myanmar)	2–4	(Philippines) Global Cebu	Yangon
15:30 UTC+6:30	Aung (yellow card) 35'; Naing Naing 38'; Lin Tun (yellow card) 78', (goal) 90+3'; Maung Soe (yellow card) 80'; Nanda Kyaw (yellow card) 86'	Report	Hartmann (yellow card) 55'; Aguinaldo (yellow card) 71'; Minegishi 72'; Roberts 82', 83'; Sasaki 89'	Stadium: Thuwunna Stadium; Attendance: 150; Referee: Mahmood Al-Majarafi (Oman)

3 May 2017 Matchday 6	Global Cebu (Philippines)	3–1	(Cambodia) Boeung Ket Angkor	Manila
20:35 UTC+8	Mulders 12'; Minegishi 28'; Wesley (yellow card) 37'; Roberts 90+3'	Report	Rosib 50'	Stadium: Rizal Memorial Stadium; Attendance: 310; Referee: Mohammad Arafah (Jordan)

==== Knockout stage ====
===== ASEAN Zonal Semifinal =====
16 May 2017 Leg 1	Global Cebu (Philippines)	2–2	(Singapore) Home United	Manila
19:30 UTC+8	Roberts 15'; Aguinaldo 53', (yellow card) 71', (yellow card) 75' (yellow-red card); Agustien (yellow card) 37'	Report	Adam 34'; Afiq (yellow card) 63'; Plazibat 90+5'	Stadium: Rizal Memorial Stadium; Attendance: 486; Referee: Wang Di (China)

30 May 2017 Leg 2	Home United (Singapore)	3–2 (Home United won 5–4 on agg.)	(Philippines) Global Cebu	Kallang
20:30 UTC+8	Fandi (yellow card) 14'; Song Ui-young (yellow card) 21', (goal) 36'; Plazibat 89', 90+4'	Report	Agustien 6' (pen.); Sasaki 49'; Villanueva (red card) 71'	Stadium: Jalan Besar Stadium; Attendance: 1,370; Referee: Ammar Al-Jeneibi (United Arab Emirates)

Home United won 5–4 on aggregate.

=== Singapore Cup ===
21 June 2017 Preliminary Round	Geylang International (Singapore)	4–4 (a.e.t.) (2–3 p)	(Philippines) Global Cebu	Kallang
20:30 UTC+8	Ichikawa 15'; Ortega 45', (yellow card) 45'; Quak 83' (pen.); Sendra 90'; Halim (yellow card) 11'; Recha (yellow card) 54'		Roberts 19', 39' (pen.), 53'; Minegishi (penalty missed); Clarino 75'; Kaole (yellow card) 70'	Stadium: Jalan Besar Stadium; Referee: Farhad Mohd

8 August 2017 Quarterfinal 1st leg	Boeung Ket Angkor (Cambodia)	1–3	(Philippines) Global Cebu	Kallang
19:30 UTC+8	Laboravy 53' (pen.)		Salenga 7', 68'; Bahadoran 45'	Stadium: Jalan Besar Stadium; Referee: G.Letchman (Singapore)

11 August 2017 Quarterfinal 2nd leg	Global Cebu (Philippines)	1–2	(Cambodia) Boeung Ket Angkor	Kallang
19:30 UTC+8	Salenga 4'		Laboravy 10'; Omogba 65'	Stadium: Jalan Besar Stadium; Referee: Muhd Taqi

27 September 2017 Semifinal 1st leg	Global Cebu (Philippines)	2–2	(Singapore) Hougang United	Kallang
19:30 UTC+8	Roberts 33', 68'		Singh 28'; Kwok 85'	Stadium: Jalan Besar Stadium; Referee: Nathan Chan

30 September 2017 Semifinal 2nd leg	Hougang United (Singapore)	1–2 (Global Cebu won 4–3 on agg.)	(Philippines) Global Cebu	Hougang
19:30 UTC+8	Rodríguez 39'		Roberts 13', 72'	Stadium: Hougang Stadium

25 November 2017 Final	Albirex Niigata (S) (Japan)	2–2 (3–1 p)	(Philippines) Global Cebu	Kallang
20:00 UTC+8	Sano 32'; Nagasaki 95'		Dos Santos 48'; Salenga 112'	Stadium: Jalan Besar Stadium; Referee: Muhammad Taqi Aljaafari Bin Jahari (SIN)

== Squad ==
=== League squad ===
As of 30 May 2017.

Squad No.	Name	Nationality	Position(s)	Date of birth (Age)	Previous club
Goalkeepers
1	Patrick Deyto	(Philippines)	GK	15 February 1990 (age 35)	(Philippines) Green Archers United
21	Rowell Bayan	(Philippines)	GK		
Defenders
4	Reynald Villareal	(Philippines)	DF	5 July 1988 (age 37)	(Philippines) Green Archers United FC
12	Amani Aguinaldo	(Philippines)	DF	24 April 1995 (age 30)	(Philippines) Far Eastern University
13	Jerry Barbaso	(Philippines)	DF	18 April 1988 (age 37)	(Philippines) Laos FC
27	Marco Casambre	(Philippines)	DF	28 August 1998 (age 27)	(Philippines) Ceres–Negros
30	Wesley	(Brazil)	DF	2 April 1992 (age 33)	
Midfielder
2	Ronnie Aguisanda	(Philippines)	MF	21 January 1991 (age 34)	(Philippines) Green Archers United FC
5	Fritz Brigoli	(Philippines)	MF	30 January 1998 (age 27)	
7	Paul Mulders	(Philippines) (Netherlands)	MF	16 January 1981 (age 44)	(Philippines) Ceres–Negros
8	Dennis Villanueva	(Philippines) (Italy)	MF	28 April 1992 (age 33)	(Italy) A.S. Ostia Mare Lido Calcio
9	Misagh Bahadoran	(Philippines) (Iran)	MF	10 January 1987 (age 38)	(Philippines) Kaya FC
11	Paolo Bugas	(Philippines)	MF	22 October 1994 (age 31)	(Philippines) Loyola Meralco Sparks
17	OJ Clarino	(Philippines)	MF	27 July 1990 (age 35)	(Philippines) Stallion Laguna FC
18	Yu Hoshide	(Japan)	MF	16 August 1977 (age 48)	(Philippines) JP Voltes
19	Paolo Salenga	(Philippines)	MF	17 December 1994 (age 30)	(Philippines) Pachanga Diliman
25	Shu Sasaki	(Japan)	MF	12 February 1991 (age 34)	(Australia) Blacktown Spartans
Strikers
10	Darryl Roberts	(Trinidad and Tobago)	FW	26 September 1983 (age 42)	(Thailand) Ubon UMT United
14	Hikaru Minegishi	(Philippines) (Japan)	FW	5 June 1991 (age 34)	(Japan) Sendai University
20	Rufo Sánchez	(Japan)	FW	27 December 1986 (age 38)	(Spain) Atlético Sanluqueño CF

== Transfer ==
=== Preseason transfer ===
==== In ====
Position	Player	Transferred From
DF	(Brazil) Wesley	Free agent
DF	(Philippines) Reynald Villareal	(Philippines) Green Archers United F.C.
MF	(Philippines) Ronnie Aguisanda	(Philippines) Green Archers United F.C.
MF	(Philippines) (Netherlands) Paul Mulders	(Philippines) Ceres–Negros F.C.
MF	(Japan) Yu Hoshide	(Philippines) JP Voltes F.C.
MF	(Curaçao) Kemy Agustien	(Netherlands) FC Dordrecht
MF	(Japan) Shu Sasaki	(Australia) Blacktown Spartans
FW	(Trinidad and Tobago) Darryl Roberts	(Thailand) Ubon UMT United F.C.
FW	(Guinea) Sekou Sylla	(Myanmar) Magwe FC

==== Out ====
Position	Player	Transferred To
DF	(Philippines) Nathan Octavio	
MF	(Philippines) (Iran) Omid Nazari	(Malaysia) Melaka United
MF	(Philippines) (Germany) Andreas Esswein	(Philippines) Davao Aguilas F.C.
FW	(Croatia) Milan Nikolic	(Philippines) F.C. Meralco Manila
GK	(Philippines) Florenco Badelic	(Philippines) F.C. Meralco Manila

=== Mid-season transfer ===
==== In ====
Position	Player	Transferred From
MF	(Philippines) (Australia) Dominic del Rosario	(Philippines) Ilocos United
MF	(Philippines) Darryl Regala	(Philippines) University of Santo Tomas
MF	(Spain) Rufo Sánchez	(Spain) Atlético Sanluqueño CF

==== Out ====
Position	Player	Transferred To
GK	(Philippines) (Canada) Nick O'Donnell	(Philippines) Davao Aguilas F.C.
MF	(Philippines) (England) Matthew Hartmann	(Philippines) Davao Aguilas F.C.
DF	(Cameroon) Serge Kaole	
MF	(Curaçao) Kemy Agustien	
FW	(Guinea) Sekou Sylla	
MF	(Japan) Yu Hoshide	
