= Leyte (disambiguation) =

Leyte is an island in the Visayas group in the Philippines.

Leyte may also refer to:

== Places in the Philippines ==
- Leyte (province), also known as Northern Leyte, a province of the Philippines that occupies the northern three-quarters of the island of Leyte
  - Leyte, Leyte, a municipality in Leyte province
- Southern Leyte, a province in the Philippines that occupies the southern part of the island of Leyte
- Leyte Gulf, the body of water immediately east of the island of Leyte

== Military ==
- Battle of Leyte, the 1944 reconquest of the island by American troops and Filipino guerrillas
- RPS Leyte, a 1944 corvette of the Philippine Navy
- USS Leyte, several US Navy ships

== Other ==
- Carmen Leyte (born 1953), Spanish politician
- Leyte F.A., East Visayas Regional Football Association, Philippines

== See also ==
- Leyte frog (disambiguation)
