= Leigh Manson =

Scottish football manager

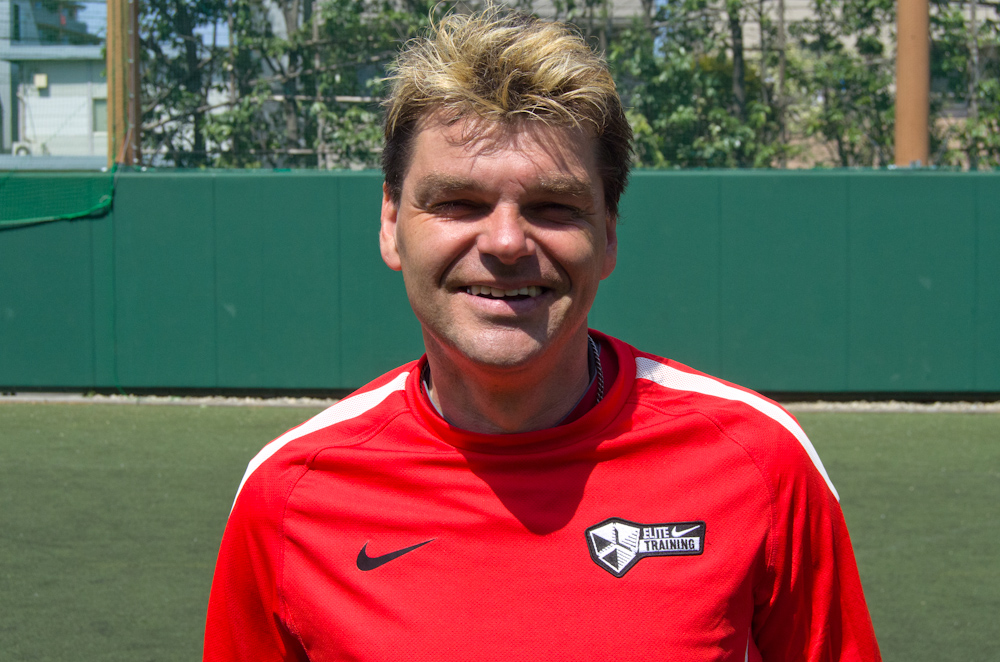

Senior career*
Years	Team	Apps	(Gls)
- Queen of the South
- Richmond Kickers
- Gretna

Managerial career
- 2013: Philippines U23
- 2014–2016: Global
- * Club domestic league appearances and goals

Leigh Manson is a Scottish football manager and the founder and current president of Nike Total Football in Japan. Manson has been coaching with the sport for 20 years, he has also played in clubs like the Queen of the South and Gretna in Scotland and the Richmond Kickers in the United States. He also served as head coach of Global which then competed in the United Football League.He currently coaches a youth academy in Nepal called Kathmandu Kickers.

== Career ==
Leigh Manson is the founder and president of Total Football in Japan. He was licensed as a Union of European Football Associations (UEFA) B coach with awards from the Scottish Football Association.

He was a part of the training of Philippines national under-23 football team as their preparation to the 2013 Southeast Asian Games. They held their training with the squad every day for two weeks.

=== Global ===
Brian Reid was replaced by Manson to coach for Global, a Philippine-based football club. He made his debut in the United Football League, the premier football league in the country against Loyola Meralco Sparks in a 4–0 loss.

=== Davao Aguilas ===
In May 2018, Manson was hired by the Philippines Football League club, Davao Aguilas as an assistant coach to their newly appointed head coach, Melchor Anzures.

== Managerial statistics ==
As of 3 April 2014

Team	Nat	From	To	Record				
Team	Nat	From	To	G	W	D	L	Win %
Global F.C.	Philippines	January 2014		28	22	2	4	78.57

== Honours ==
Global FC

- United Football League: 2014; runner-up 2015
- UFL Cup: 2016
- UFL FA Cup: 2014
- UFL FA League Cup runner-up: 2014
- PFF Club Championship runner-up: 2014–15
