= Izzeldin Elhabib =

Sudanese footballer (born 1987)

Izzeldin El Habib
Personal information
- Full name: Izzeldin Elzaki Ibrahim Elhabib
- Date of birth: 14 March 1987 (age 39)
- Place of birth: El Obeid, Sudan
- Height: 1.83 m (6 ft 0 in)
- Position: Forward

Team information
- Current team: One Taguig
- Number: 99

College career
Years	Team	Apps	(Gls)
- La Salle University

Senior career*
Years	Team	Apps	(Gls)
–2010	Kaya		
2010–2016	Global F.C.		
2016	Laos		
2024–	One Taguig	1	(1)
- * Club domestic league appearances and goals

Izzeldin 'Izo' Elhabib (born 14 March 1987) is a Sudanese professional footballer who plays for One Taguig of the Philippine Football League. He has a brother named Badreldin whose preferred position is central defender.

== Early life ==
Born in El Obeid, Sudan, Elhabib grew up in Riyadh, Saudi Arabia, starting football aged 3.

== Career in the Philippines ==
A student of La Salle University, Elhabib played varsity football while studying there.

He won the United Football League Top Goalscorer award with Kaya.

Bagging 8 goals, he was pronounced top scorer of the 2010 UFL Cup.

Seen as a threat to other teams in the 2013 Singapore Cup and known for taking advantage of disorganized defence, Elhabib scored 10 goals in 14 matches for Global by mid-season 2013, followed by a hat-trick versus Forza F.C. in the United Football League Cup that year. At Global, the forward wore the number 10 jersey, a number that usually betokens the team's star player. Forming a good relationship with Global chairman Dan Palami, he thanked the Cebu-based club for their munificence towards him and recorded 13 goals in the 2011 United Football League, two seasons before 2013.

In 2012, Elhabib considered giving up his Sudanese citizenship to get a Filipino passport in order to be naturalized and represent the Philippines internationally.

He missed out on the 2013 AFC President's Cup on account of being dropped from Global's squad for the competition.

In 2016, he signed for Laos F.C.

In 2024, he plays for One Taguig F.C.

== Personal life ==
The former Kaya player favors Brazilian footballer Ronaldo as his favorite player.
