= 2014 Global Cebu F.C. season =

Global F.C.
2014 season
- Chief Executive: Dan Palami
- Coach: Leigh Manson
- UFL Division 1: 1st
- UFL Cup: disqualified
Home colours	Away colours

The 2014 season is Global's 4th season in Division I in the United Football League (UFL) which is the Philippines premier league based in the National Capital Region.

This edition, the 2014 United Football League, introduces a longer format of competition that Division I teams will play their opponents three times during the season instead of two. This also marks the debut season of their new head coach Leigh Manson after replacing Brian Reid.

== United Football League ==
All times were Philippine Standard Time – UTC+08:00

Pos	Team	Pld	W	D	L	GF	GA	GD	Pts	Qualification or relegation
1	Global (C)	24	20	2	2	112	20	+92	62	Qualification to the 2015 AFC Cup Group stage
2	Loyola	24	15	4	5	65	29	+36	49	
3	Kaya	24	14	4	6	64	28	+36	46	

Updated to match(es) played on 26 June 2014. Source: rsssf.com, soccerway.com
Rules for classification: 1) Points; 2) Goal Difference; 3) Goals Scored
(C) Champions

14 January 2014 1	Loyola Meralco Sparks	v	Global	Fort Bonifacio, Taguig
19:30		Report		Stadium: Emperador Stadium

Win Draw Loss Void
