= Dennis Villanueva =

Filipino footballer (born 1992)

- Villanueva after a match against Afghanistan in 2023

Personal information
- Full name: Dennis Jaramel Villanueva
- Date of birth: April 28, 1992 (age 34)
- Place of birth: Rome, Italy
- Height: 1.78 m (5 ft 10 in)
- Positions: Defensive midfielder; left-back

Youth career
- Lazio

Senior career*
Years	Team	Apps	(Gls)
2012–2014	Ostia Mare	43	(1)
2014–2017	Global Cebu	53	(8)
2018–2019	Davao Aguilas	19	(1)
2019	Ceres–Negros / United City	8	(1)
2020–2022	Nakhon Ratchasima	38	(1)
2022	PT Prachuap	11	(0)
2023	Nakhon Ratchasima	13	(0)
2023–2024	Police Tero	24	(2)

International career^{‡}
2015–2023	Philippines	18	(0)
- * Club domestic league appearances and goals as of 26 May 2024 (UTC) ‡ National team caps and goals as of 22:15; 21 November 2023 (UTC)

Dennis Jaramel Villanueva (born April 28, 1992) is a former professional footballer who played as a defensive midfielder or a left-back.

Born in Italy to Filipino parents, he spent his youth career with Lazio. He started his senior career with Ostia Mare in Serie D before playing in the Philippines for Global, Davao Aguilas, and Ceres–Negros. He also played for the Philippines national team.

== Club ==
Villanueva was part of the Lazio youth. Villanueva also played for Ostia Mare Lido Calcio of Serie D. After his stint with the fourth division Italian club, he played for Global of the United Football League in the Philippines. Villanueva played in all six of Global's matches at the 2015 AFC Cup. Villanueva is known for his fighting spirit and never-say-die attitude; in a match against Stallion on 22 February 2015 he scored a goal in stoppage time to seal a 2–1 win, earning the praise of coach Leigh Manson.

== International ==
Villanueva was first called up to play for the Philippine national team at the 2014 AFF Suzuki Cup and was part of the squad's bench but was not subbed in. He was called up again for the national team's 2018 FIFA World Cup qualifier matches against Bahrain and Yemen scheduled on June 11 and 16 respectively. He was not subbed in at the Bahrain match but finally made his first international debut after being subbed in at the Yemen match, replacing Stephan Palla at the 78th minute.

== Personal life ==
Villanueva was born in Rome to Filipino parents and became involved in football at the age of five. His family roots can be traced to Laiya, San Juan, Batangas.

== Career statistics ==
=== Club ===
As of match played on 11 November 2016

Club	Season	League			Cup (Note: Includes cup competitions such as Coppa Italia Serie D and Singapore Cup)		Continental		Total	
Club	Season	Division	Apps	Goals	Apps	Goals	Apps	Goals	Apps	Goals
Ostia Mare	2012–13	Serie D	27	1	—		—		27	1
Ostia Mare	2013–14	Serie D	16	0	1	0	—		17	0
Ostia Mare	Total		43	1	1	0	—		44	1
Global FC	2015	UFL	10	2	6	1	—		16	3
Global FC	2016	UFL	15	3	2	0	—		17	3
Global FC	Total		25	5	8	1	—		33	6
Career total			68	6	9	1	0		77	7

== Honours ==
=== Club ===
Global FC

- United Football League: 2016
- United Football League Cup: 2016
