= Global F.C. =

Filipino association football club based in Makati, Metro Manila

Global
- Full name: Global Football Club
- Short name: GFC
- Founded: March 2000; 26 years ago (as Laos F.C.) (Note: Not to be confused with a sister club established under the same name. The club as Makati United F.C. is legally established in 2019 but is effectively a continuation of Global F.C.)
- 2019: Philippines Football League, 7th of 7
Home colours	Away colours

Global Football Club was a professional football club that last played in the Philippines Football League (PFL), the top flight of Philippines' club football. The club has won four league titles, two UFL Cups, one UFL FA Cup, and one PFF National Men's Club Championship. They have participated in the AFC Cup three times.

Founded in 2000, Global FC participated in minor tournaments around Metro Manila as Laos Football Club. In 2009, after recruiting several players from the railway maintenance company APT Global, the club changed its name to Global Football Club and were one of the founding members of the United Football League (UFL). Global won the 2010 UFL Division 2 with an undefeated season, earning promotion to UFL Division 1—the de facto top-level league of Philippine football back then. They went on to win three of the seven UFL seasons (commemorated by the three stars on the club's crest)—becoming the most successful club in the league.

In 2017, the club moved to Cebu City and renamed itself to Global Cebu F.C. to participate in the Philippines Football League (PFL), which was the official top flight of Philippine football. In the PFL, the club finished as runners-up of the 2017 season and by the end of the season, Alvin Carranza became owner of Global, succeeding founder Dan Palami. However, they went through a period of decline in 2018, where they experienced financial troubles and had to forfeit or postpone some away matches; some players also complained of unpaid wages. With several key players leaving the club, and with just one win in 25 league matches, they ended the 2018 season at the bottom of the table. Mid-season, the club had another ownership change with Mark Jarvis taking over from Carranza.

In 2019, the club relocated to Makati and adopted their current name. They intended to participate in the inaugural season of the Philippine Premier League but withdrew from the league without playing a match due to various issues with the league management. They later joined the revived PFL.

In January 2020, the club reportedly underwent an ownership change with Hong Kong–based Mazinyi taking over and the club reverted its name back to Global F.C. However, player wage issues continued to hound Global with Mazinyi distancing itself from the club in August 2020, alleging it had never taken over the club from Jarvis. This led to the suspension of Global's PFF license as well as the blacklisting of the club by the Games and Amusement Board.

== History ==
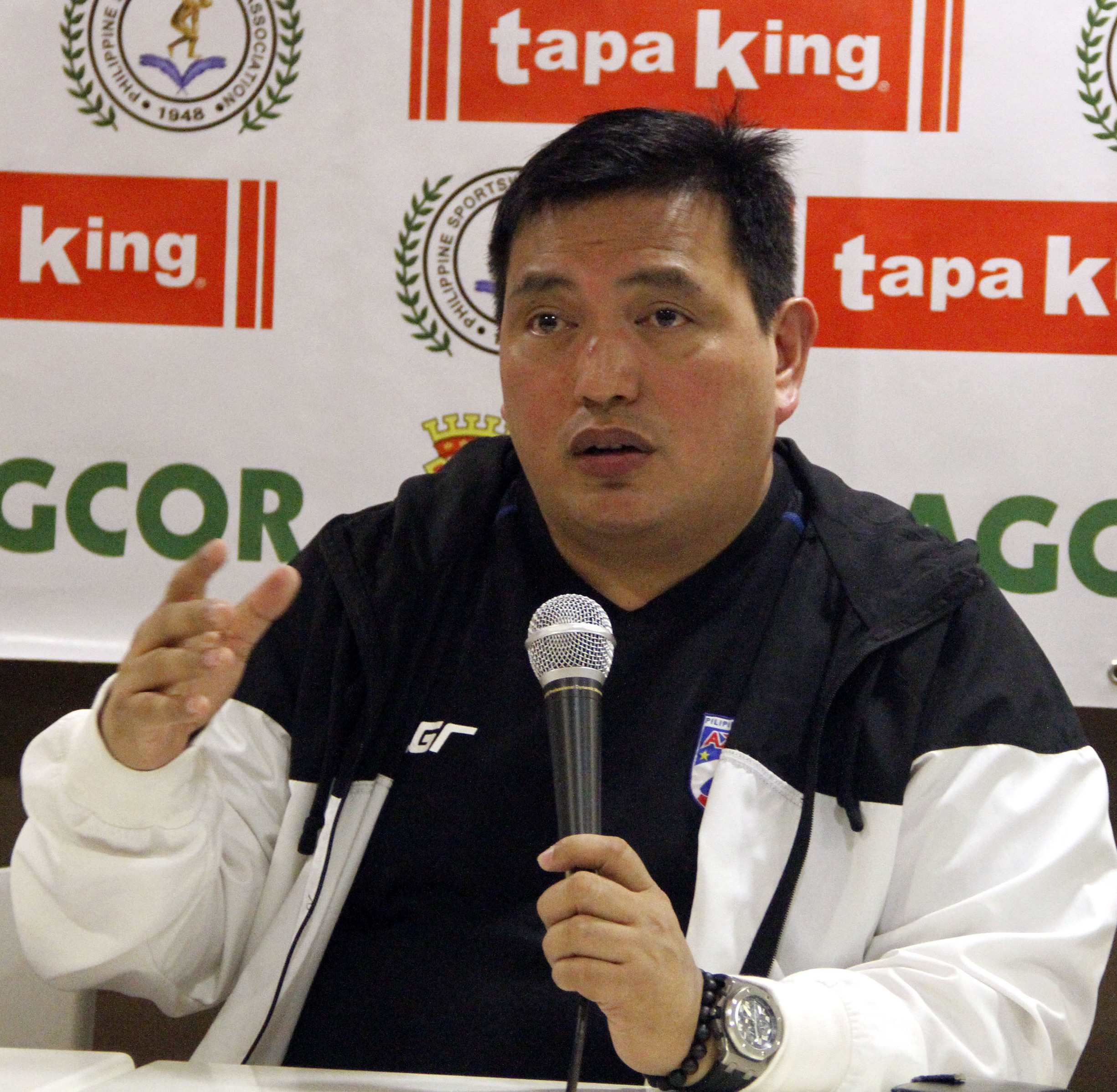
Dan Palami was the owner and chief executive of the club from 2009 until December 2017.

=== Foundation and early years (2000–2009) ===
Global FC was founded in March 2000 when a group of football enthusiasts from Tacloban formed a weekly football practice as their leisure activity. The group played their first weekly football games behind the Quezon City Hall, and later moving to the Sunken Garden football field inside the University of the Philippines Diliman. Then they began to participate in minor tournaments around Manila, including the Alaska Cup, the Kia Cup, and Ang Liga, under the name Laos F.C. (Tagalog: [ˈlɐʔos]; "has-beens", no relation to the country of Laos). After hiring football players from employees at a railway company Autre Porte Technique Global (APT Global), they decided in 2009 that the club would be renamed to Global Football Club. Dan Palami, the chief executive officer of the railway company, was hired as the owner of Global.

Eventually, they joined the 2009 UFL Cup, with Smartmatic as their corporate sponsor. Global competed in Group B and finished third at the group stages, advancing them to the plate cup single-elimination tournament. Because of this, they would play at Division II in the United Football League. Global is one of the founding club members in the competition.

=== Global in the United Football League (2010–2016) ===
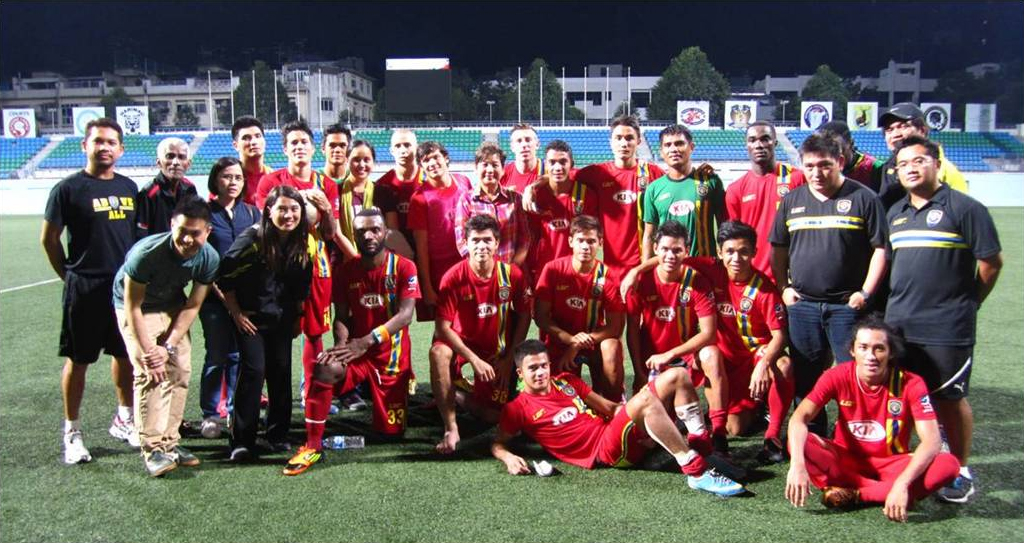
Members and officials of the Global FC squad that competed at the 2013 Singapore Cup

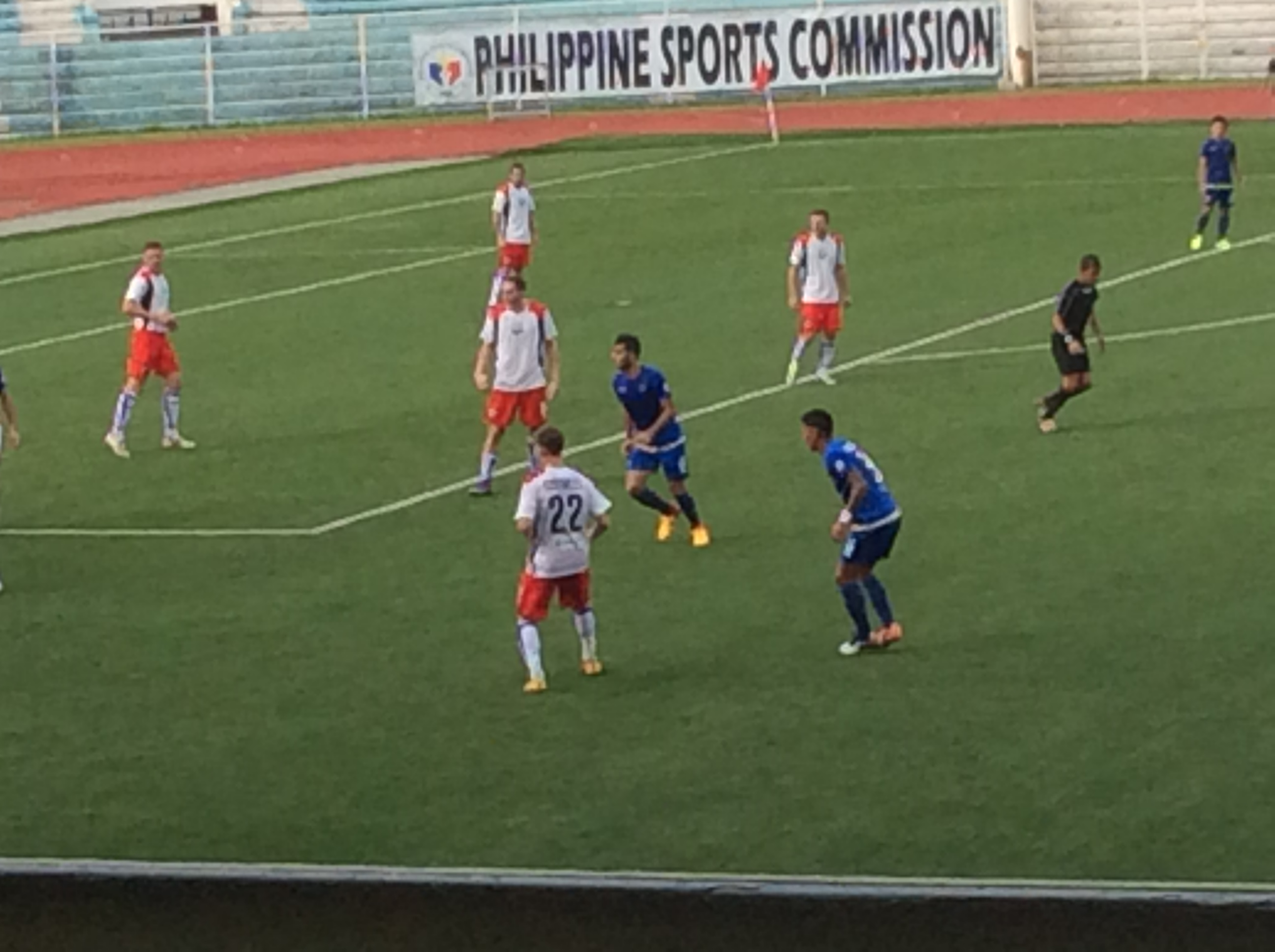
Global FC vs Australian side Perth Glory FC, 2016

In 2010, Global made its debut in the inaugural season of the United Football League (UFL) as a Division II team. They went undefeated throughout the season to secure a promotion to Division I. They were also victorious in the league cup after defeating Philippine Air Force in the finals. Franklin Muescan, the current head coach of that time then led his team to a second-place finish in their first appearance in the top-tier 2011 United Football League. After an opening match against Stallion in the 2011 UFL Cup, the owner of the team, Dan Palami, hired Australian Graeme Mackinnon as head coach. Global would be later eliminated by the Philippine Air Force in the semi-finals. Global also made their first appearance at the 2011 National Men's Club Championship after it was established in the same year. They won over San Beda FC in the finals making the first champion of the tournament. (Note: Global was competing under the name Teknika F.C. due to sponsorship reasons.)

Global then finished the 2012 league season tied with Kaya but claimed their first Division I title in goal difference. Because of their victory in the league, Global advanced to the 2013 AFC President's Cup and was the first Filipino football club to qualify for the tournament since its inception in 2005, but they were eliminated early in the group stages. Global began to compete at the 2012 UFL Cup in the second group and finished unbeaten. Global survived the knockout stages and Stallion won the trophy over an "upset" against them.

Graeme Mackinnon resigned as the coach for Global at the end of the 2012 UFL season because of family concerns about the destruction of Tropical Storm Washi in Mindanao where his family lived. After a month-long search for a replacement, former Ayr United head coach Brian Reid was signed for the position. He was in charge of the club's campaign in the President's Cup. In the fourth season of the UFL, Global finished second, three points beneath the top, resulting in Stallion winning the championship trophy. The team began to compete at the 2012–13 National Men's Club Championship, where they lost in the quarter-finals to Ceres. Eventually, Global was invited to play in the 2013 Singapore Cup as a guest club, together with fellow UFL side Loyola Meralco Sparks. As a result, they became the second Philippine club to reach the semi-finals of the tournament. However, Global would lose to Tanjong Pagar United.

They won both the 2014 season and the FA Cup on the same year.

=== Global Cebu in the Philippines Football League (2017–2019) ===
A slot was allocated for the Philippines in the preliminary stage of the 2017 AFC Champions League. Global as winners of the 2016 UFL season represented the country in the tournament. Global fails to qualify for the group stage after losing to Brisbane Roar by 6–0 in the second round of the qualification phase, and was relegated to the group stage of the 2017 AFC Cup.

Global was confirmed in November 2016 to be one of the teams to participate in the inaugural season of the Philippines Football League. On December 30, 2016, it was reported that Global planned to adopt the name "Global Queen City FC" as a nod to the defunct Cebu-based team that participated in the UFL, the Cebu Queen City United F.C. Global owner, Dan Palami also expressed openness to investments from Cebuanos in the same report. The club changed its name to Global Cebu FC.

On July 5, 2017, Global Cebu played their first home match at their designated home venue, the Cebu City Sports Complex. The club went on to finish second to champions Ceres-Negros in the overall standings of the PFL inaugural season. In December 2017 after the PFL season concluded, the football club reportedly had a new owner. Alvin Carranza, founder and owner of MacGraphics Carranz International Corp and managing director of the Teen Azkals Foundation, and replaced Dan Palami as the club's owner.

==== Financial crisis and overhaul ====
The transfer of ownership of Global Cebu caused financial uncertainty of the club with funding coming into halt and the club was rumored to be under the threat of becoming defunct. In the 2018 season, Global was playing its home matches in the Rizal Memorial Stadium. In May 2018, Global was forced to request the league to postponed an away match against Kaya F.C.–Iloilo which led to the cancellation of the match. The club later announced in May 2018 that financial issues was the reason they could not play the match. The club also released an official statement that in January 2018, Global Cebu owner Alvin Carranza requested the PFL for the club not to participate in the league but the whole management of the club decided against withdrawing from the league. This is because the PFL would only be left with five clubs after the departure of Ilocos United and Manila Meralco. If the withdrawal pushed through, the Philippines would lose eligibility to have its clubs participate in the AFC Cup. This development would later be officially announced to the public by the club in May 2018.

Some other away matches of Global Cebu were either cancelled or delayed and key players of the club left. At one point of the league season, Global Cebu suffered at 1–11 loss to JPV Marikina on August 1, 2018, due to being unable to field a natural goalkeeper due to injury of their only keeper in their squad at that time. From being among the top clubs in the previous PFL season, Global Cebu fell to the bottom of the 2018 PFL table.

The club later secured sponsorship from Puma and in August 2018, it was confirmed that by this time Mark Jarvis was now the owner of the club. Jarvis, the father of Global defender Jordan Jarvis, had previous indirect ownership of the club. Under his watch, the club had a major overhaul, signing numerous players to play for Global Cebu in the July 2018 transfer window. The club under Jarvis planned to focus on the club's survival for the rest of 2018.

However, in January 2019, financial issues remain with several players including former goalkeeper Milan Nikolic calling out team owner Jarvis for the non-payment of their wages.

=== Global Makati in the Philippine Premier League (2019) ===
Global Cebu are set to join the Philippine Premier League which replaced the PFL despite financial issues experiencing by the club. On February 5, 2019, the club announced that they would be changing their home locality from Cebu to Makati in Metro Manila and that they will be changing their name to "Global Makati F.C." The club then renamed themselves as "United Makati FC" as a result of a Facebook poll organized by the club.

Within the same month, the club management announced a partnership with MMC Sportz and stated that they will have support from the Makati city government. Makati United pledged that it will pay its outstanding dues to unpaid players before the start of the inaugural Philippine Premier League season to avoid risking their eligibility to participate in the league. The club re-signed seven to eight players and head coach Dragutin Stević-Ranković and made new player signings as well. The club said it will focus on the grassroots level and a salary cap was reportedly imposed as a result of such.

In March 2019, United Makati announced its legal disassociation with its past as Global Makati F.C., registering with the Philippine Football Federation as a distinct separate legal entity from its former iteration as Global. However such plan didn't push through and the club reverted to Global Makati. Global Makati along with Stallion Laguna withdrew from the league on April 26, 2019, a day before the first match day of the league citing concerns regarding what the Stallion management see as a lack of professionalism and transparency regarding the league's management. However, PPL dissolved with Global rejoining the PFL.

=== Global Makati in the revived Philippines Football League (2019) ===
The Philippines Football League was revived in 2019 after the Philippine Premier League its supposed replacement was dissolved in same year. Global continued its participation in the PFL but continued to struggle, finishing at the bottom of the 2019 season's table behind debutantes Green Archers United and Mendiola. During the 2019 season, the PFL referred to the club as Global Cebu instead of Global Makati in official league channels due to licensing issues.

=== Mazinyi's involvement and continued wage issues (since 2020) ===
Their status for the 2020 season was left with uncertainty until Global announced its intent to continue its participation in the league and the reportedly the relinquishing of the club by its owner Jarvis to Hong Kong–based Mazinyi Management Ltd. In February 2020, Global Makati reverted its name back to Global F.C. and modified its crest to reflect the name change.

Reports of unpaid wages by Global to its players remained. English footballer John Cofie who was signed in to play for the club in January 2020, came forward to the public of allegations that Global owed him unpaid wages. He has sought the Games and Amusements Board to help him deal with the situation and the Philippines Football League officials has scheduled to meet with representatives of Global FC regarding the matter. If the allegations were proven, the PFL has said that Global's license may be revoked rendering them ineligible to participate in the 2020 PFL season. A graphic designer commissioned by Global has also said that they have not been paid for services rendered to the club.

The PFF gave Global a ten-day ultimatum from July 23, to settle all its outstanding wages to its players and staff and other contractual obligations. While Global managed to settle its obligations with the graphic designer, it failed to do so for its players and staff and the PFF will now refer Global's case to its Licensing First Instance Body. The Games and Amusements Board (GAB) on their part have started their on investigation announcing on August 8, that they have issued a show cause order to demanding them to air their side in writing within 10 days from receipt of such order regarding the unpaid wage allegations However Mazinyi Management reportedly distanced itself from the wage issues, saying that Mark Jarvis is still the owner, and that they have backed out from taking over as the club's new owner allegedly due to documentary issues. The PFF suspended Global's PFL license for 90 days. The Games and Amusement Board followed suit by blacklisting the club on September 7.

== Club rivalry ==
=== Rivalry with Ceres–Negros F.C. ===
Global first arrived in the local football scene in 2010 as the undefeated UFL Division 2 champions. Then after gaining promotion to Division 1, they went on to challenge powerhouse Philippine Air Force for the crowned of being best club in the country. They have won three titles and have two runner-up finishes before Ceres arrived the scene in 2012. Since the emergence of Ceres–Negros F.C. as one of Philippine football's powerhouse clubs, the club became a serious threat to Global's dominance in the local football scene. Between 2013 and 2017, the rivalry has developed into an intense and fiery competition between both sides. Both club's have battle it out in a total of three finals showdown in domestic cup campaigns, and fought three tight battle's for the domestic league title's, two for the last two league titles of the UFL and the other being the first and only 2017 PFL "Finals Series". Before the Global-Ceres rivalry, the Philippine Club Footballing Landscape was dominated by the "big three", composed of the Philippine Army, Philippine Air Force and Philippine Navy football clubs. For the longest time, the various football teams of the Armed Forces of the Philippines were the best clubs in the country. But by 2012, the armed forces teams went through a period of rapid decline. The new rivalry between Global and Ceres proceeded thereafter, as both clubs would go on to dominate Philippine Club Football for the next eight years.

In the calendar year of 2013, a rivalry was born. Global's rivalry with Ceres began to develop on January 19, 2013, when the two sides met in a quarter-finals match of the 2012–13 PFF National Men's Club Championship. The then unknown club based in football hotbed Bacolod City, and formerly known as "Ceres-La Salle", Ceres scored a major 1–0 "upset" against UFL league champions Global Football Club. Ceres would go on to win that national tournament and claimed its first major trophy. In the next edition of the national tournament, Global and Ceres would meet in a Finals match up for the first time during the 2013–14 PFF National Men's Club Championship. Global was the first champion of the tournament(2011), while Ceres was the 2nd champion(2012–13). They battled it out for the coveted title, the nice top prize and the distinction as the best club team in the Philippines. The tournament was hosted by Negros Occidental FA, with matches held at Panaad Sports Complex, University of St. La Salle in Bacolod City, and also in the Bago City Sports Complex. Ceres, being the Negros Occidental–based club is therefore the home-team, while Global participated under Leyte FA. This would be the precursor to what would later evolve into the first "Visayas derby". During the two-legged finals, Ceres beat Global on 3–1 aggregate to retained the title. In the aftermath, as national tournament winners, Ceres earn a guaranteed 'spot' in the 2015 AFC Cup Play-off.

In the 2014 UFL Season, Global was crowned UFL Division 1 champions, while Ceres have just earned their promotion to Division 1 after winning the UFL Division 2 title. Ceres signed a number of national team members such as Patrick Reichelt, Carlie De Murga and brothers Marwin and Marvin Angeles to boost its campaign. As fate would have it, Ceres and Global met again in the finals to battle for the first and only UFL FA League Cup trophy. During the finals, Ceres came out firing right at the opening whistle, with Kim Jin Ho scoring at the first minute after converting a header for an early 1-nil lead. Ceres suffered a huge blow after Azkals veteran Carlie De Murga was stretchered out of the pitch due to a possible knee injury. He never returned to the game. But Adrián Gallardo doubled Ceres’ cushion with a header at the 22nd minute as they held a comfortable 2-nil halftime lead. In the second half, Global got a boost when Mark Hartmann connected with a long-distance shot from outside the box off a Misagh Bahadoran feed to trim their deficit, 2–1. Global then got another break a few minutes after as Ceres team captain Juani Guirado was sent off after being involved in a scuffle that saw Global goalkeeper Patrick Deyto hurt after a Ceres player accidentally hit him in the head. That reduced the newly promoted club to just 10 men, giving Global another shot at tying the match. But Global, despite having plenty of chances at the goal, failed to convert its shots, including a last-second effort which was denied by the Ceres goalkeeper Louie Casas that sealed the result. Ceres managed to hold on and won its first major trophy in the UFL after having been promoted during that season. The victory halted Global's run of back-to-back trophies in the UFL, while effectively throwing into disarray the hierarchy of clubs in the Philippines’ elite domestic competition. Global head coach Leigh Manson was pleased at the interest generated by the spectacular affair. "Tonight's game, with the amount of fans – the passion, the drama, the excitement, that's got to be great for the League, for Filipino football," he said.

In 2015 Ceres won their first UFL League title with two games to spare, Ceres led by Adrián Gallardo's 18 goals was eight points ahead of runners-up Global. During that period, from late 2014 to 2015, Global would endured a disappointing 1 and 1/2-season stretch, losing in three straight Finals. Two of the losses were against archrivals Ceres.

In the 2016 UFL Season and the 2016 UFL Cup, Global would finally have its redemption against bitter rival Ceres. The club would go on to achieve a league double, by winning the annual UFL league and cup tournaments. Only three clubs in the Philippines have achieved a league double, and the members of that exclusive group were – Philippine Air Force F.C. in 2009–10, Stallion Laguna F.C. in 2012–13 and Global Makati F.C. in 2016. Ceres would be runners-up to Global in both league and cup tournaments. During the UFL Cup finals, Global was coming off a ban from the previous edition of the UFL Cup. Global came back to reclaim their place as one of the country's top clubs with the help of the brace of Azkals standout and tournament Golden Ball Misagh Bahadoran. Global quickly capitalized on a distraught defense of Ceres in the consequent minutes of the affair with Bahadoran left unmarked inside the box to strike the rebound in the 21st minute and open the scoring. Not long after, the defense of the Bacolod-based club was left to pay with another goal as Bahadoran found Matthew Hartman on the edge of the box to elevate their squad's lead to 2–0 going into the break. After the restart Bahadoran doubled his output in the night with an impressive effort inside the area to shake away defender Jason Sabio and put the ball to the back of the net in the 56th minute. Tension flared in the match when Ceres head coach Ali Go was thrown off the playing area following an altercation on the pitch after the side's protest of a non-call of a handball in the penalty box. The Busmen finally scratched a mark in their scorecard in the 61st minute with a shot courtesy of substitute Nate Burkey to cut the deficit down to just two goals. Ceres scrambled their jets in the remaining minutes of affair to ignite their offense, sending in Stephan Schröck to augment their attacks, but they were unable to turn the game around until the end of regulation. Global captured the 2016 UFL Cup title, on a 3–1 finals victory. Misagh Bahadoran would later be awarded with the PSA ‘Mr. Philippine football’ award for his heroics in the last UFL Cup tournament. In the seventh and last season of the UFL League since its establishment as a semi-professional league in 2009, Global led by UFL Golden Ball awardee Hikaru Minegishi, won the league title with one game to spare, Global was six points ahead of runners-up Ceres. With the win, Global returns to the next edition of the AFC Cup with a sure slot in the qualification round of the continental club championship.

In the calendar year of 2017, the PFF, the governing body of Philippine Football, decided to replace the Metro Manila–based UFL for a nationwide, community-based football league that is at par with the standards set by the FIFA and the AFC. A nationwide survey have favored "Philippines Football League" as the name for the new league. As a community-based league with a home-and-away double round robin format, clubs were required under the PFF Club Licensing Regulations to have a name that includes the name of their home locality and were also required to have a certified home stadium. Ceres being based in the city of Bacolod, added Negros in their club name. While Global made a switch, originally a regular member of Leyte FA(now EVRFA) and owned by Leyte FA Pres.Dan Palami, the club decided to relocate to Cebu City, and adopted the name "Global Queen City FC." (later renamed as Global Cebu FC). These developments lead fans to dubbed the Global-Ceres rivalry as the "Visayas derby" or the "Visayas Clásico". During the PFL's inaugural season, the league had two phases, the regular season, and the "Finals Series", a play-off round where the top four teams of the regular season played each other to determine the champions of the league. As the inaugural season reach its finale, the archnemeses once again crossed paths during the PFL "Finals Series" to resume their fierce rivalry. Ceres–Negros F.C. won the league's inaugural championship by defeating archrivals Global Cebu F.C. in the Final, 4–1. Iain Ramsay scored a hat-trick that sealed the victory. With Kaya relocating from Makati to Iloilo, one of the country's football hotbed, the PFL's "Visayas derby" got all the more interesting and competitive as Kaya joined reigning champ Ceres–Negros F.C. and runner-up Global Cebu F.C. in the mix for the 2018 PFL season.

By 2019, the PFL "Finals Series" was the last of many championship battles between the bitter rivals. Over an 8-year period, archrivals Global and Ceres have dominated Philippine Club football. Both clubs have won a combined 13 titles out of the total 21 crowns from years 2011 to 2018, with Global winning seven major Trophies, and rivals Ceres winning six, with four of its titles won at the expense of Global. Ceres–Negros FC would go on to win back-to-back PFL titles and be ranked as AFC ASEAN Zone's no.1 club. While Global Cebu F.C. now renamed as "Global Makati FC" and also relocated to the city of Makati, went through a period of decline in 2018 and is currently undergoing a financial crisis. This crisis also led to a mass exodus of Global F.C. stars. Currently, the rivalry have experienced a period of uncertainty as fans witness how Ceres routed its financially crippled rival in their last 5 matches in the last two seasons. Filipino football fans may wonder will Global ever recover from the crisis or when will it go back to its winning-ways and resume its championship rivalry with Ceres–Negros. The rivalry being tagged as the "Visayas Clásico" may no longer be appropriate, but the rivalry is definitely not defunct.

== Stadiums ==
The club joined the PFL in 2017 and maintained as their home ground the Cebu City Sports Complex. Global started play in the stadium during the 2013 AFC President's Cup. Before the club joined the Philippines Football League, Global did not have its own football ground. Instead, they played in neutral venues across the Philippines, such as the McKinley Hill Stadium in Taguig and the Rizal Memorial Stadium in Manila (considered as the national stadium of the country) when they were still in the UFL.

== Crest history ==
The first team emblem was used from 2000 to 2011, during which time the club was known as Global F.C. The logo was a simple crest with the words "Global F.C." in front of a wireframe globe. The second logo, the revamped club logo, was used for a year during the latter portion of the 2011 UFL season. The crest was blue with yellow borders, displaying "Global F.C." on top and the year "2000" at the bottom. In the middle was a yellow gold globe. The third crest removed the foundation date and replaced it with the text "Global Football Club" around the globe. The club released its fourth logo on April 26, 2017, through its social media account when it joined the Philippines Football League as Global Cebu F.C. The new logo is derived from the third logo, with the text "Cebu" placed in the center of the crest. Three stars are also added to the top of the crest, which symbolizes the three national championships won by the club in the UFL.

When the club adopted the name Global Makati F.C. on February 4, 2019, they maintained use of the crest when the club was known as Global Cebu F.C.; "Cebu" was replaced by "Makati". The club would rebrand itself that month as United Makati F.C. and a with new crest which was derived from the Seal of Makati. In March 2019, the club revert to its original Global Makati crest after United Makati separated from Global. In February 2020, the new club owners restore its original name "Global FC" and adopted a newly enhance logo removing the word "Makati" and replaced by three stars which represents the title that won by the club.

The club's first crest, used from 2009 to 2011

Crest used from 2011 to 2012

The club's third crest, used from 2012 to 2017

The club's fourth crest, used from 2017 to 2019

The club's fifth crest. This version was briefly adopted with "Makati" text instead of Cebu when the club renamed itself "Global Makati F.C." in February 2019.

The club's sixth crest, used in 2020, a version where the name "Makati" was replaced by three stars which represents the title won by the club, restoring its original name, "Global FC"

== Sponsors ==
On August 29, 2013, the Colombian Autocar Corporation, the exclusive distributor of Kia Motors in the Philippines, held a contract signing event with Dan Palami to renew their partnership for another year. Kia Motors is the club's major sponsor and transportation provider of the team. AtletA Sportswear, a local manufacturer of activewear, is the club's official supplier of match kits, training kits, and casual wear. LGR Athletic Wears was the former creator of the match kits; as they were responsible in selling the kits in the mainstream market for the first time. Melmac Sports Management is the official marketing agency of the team.

== Management team ==
Position	Staff
Head coach	(Australia) Gary Phillips
Assistant head coach	(Spain) Ramiro Muñoz
Goalkeeping coach	(England) Steve Marsella

== Kit manufacturers and shirt sponsors ==
Year(s)	Kit manufacturer(s)	Shirt partner(s)
2009–11		Smartmatic
2012	LGR	None
2013	LGR	Kia
2014	AtletA SportsWear	Kia
2015	Accel	Smart
2016–18	LGR	None
2016–18	LGR	Cebu Tourism Board
2016–18	LGR	TrackMate
2019	Chronos Athletics	MMC Sportz
2020	Monte Athletics	

=== Kit evolution ===
Home
2011	2012	2013	2014	2014–2015	2015–2016	2016–2017	2017–2018

Away
2011	2012	2013	2014	2014–2015	2015–2016	2016–2017	2017–2018

== Head coaches ==
Since the appointment of Global head coach Filipino Franklin Muescan, there have been 13 other recognized head coaches. The first head coach from outside the Philippines was Australian coach Graeme Mackinnon.

Head coaching history
Name	Year(s)
(Philippines) Franklin Muescan	2001–11
(Australia) Graeme Mackinnon	2011–12
(Philippines) Edwin Cabalida	2012
(Philippines) Dan Palami (caretaker)	2013
(Scotland) Brian Reid	2013–14
(Scotland) Leigh Manson	2014–16
(England) John Burridge	2016
(Japan) Kenichi Yatsuhashi	2016
(Japan) Toshiaki Imai	2017
(Philippines) Marjo Allado (interim) (Note: Allado took over as head coach from Imai on an interim basis before Global's 2017 AFC Cup ASEAN zonal semi-final against Home United. Imai flew to Japan to attend to family matters.)	2017
(Singapore) Akbar Nawas	2017
(Philippines) Marjo Allado (interim)	2018
(Serbia) Dragutin Stević-Ranković	2018
(Philippines) Franklin Muescan	2019
(Australia) Gary Phillips	2020

== Former players ==
For a list of former Global players with Wikipedia articles, see Global F.C. players.

== Individual player awards ==
Season	Name	Nationality	Position	Notes
2010	Izzeldin Elhabbib	Sudan	Forward	2010 UFL Cup No.1 Top Goalscorer (8 goals), 2010 UFL Golden Boot (14 goals)
2011	Izzeldin Elhabbib	Sudan	Forward	2011 UFL Golden Boot (10 goals)
2013	Roland Sadia	Ivory Coast	Goalkeeper	2013 UFL Best Goalkeeper (UFL Golden Glove)
2014	Jason de Jong	Philippines	Midfielder	2014 UFL Golden Ball
2014	Mark Hartmann	Philippines	Forward	2014 UFL Golden Boot (27 goals)
2014	Roland Sadia	Ivory Coast	Goalkeeper	2014 UFL Best Goalkeeper (UFL Golden Glove)
2014	Mark Hartmann	Philippines	Forward	2014 UFL FA League Cup No.1 Top Goalscorer (10 goals)
2014	Patrick Deyto	Philippines	Goalkeeper	2014 UFL FA League Cup Golden Glove
2015	Izzeldin Elhabbib	Sudan	Forward	2014–15 PFF National Men's Club Championship Best Forward Award & Golden Boot (7 goals)
2016	Hikaru Minegishi	Philippines	Midfielder	2016 UFL Golden Ball, 2016 UFL No.5 Top Goalscorer (17 goals), 2016 Singapore Cup No.3 Top Goalscorer (3 goals)
2016	Misagh Bahadoran	Philippines	Forward	2016 UFL Cup Golden Ball
2016	Patrick Deyto	Philippines	Goalkeeper	2016 UFL Cup Best Goalkeeper
2016	Matthew Hartmann	Philippines	Midfielder	2016 UFL Best Midfielder, 2016 UFL Cup No.6 Top Goalscorer (5 goals)
2016	Amani Aguinaldo	Philippines	Defender	2016 UFL Cup Best Defender
2017	Darryl Roberts	Trinidad and Tobago	Forward	2017 Singapore Cup No.1 Top Goalscorer (7 goals)
2017	Misagh Bahadoran	Philippines	Forward	2017 PSA Annual Awards Mr. Football (Footballer of the Year Award)

== Honors ==
=== Leagues ===
- Philippines Football League
  - Runners-up: 2017
- United Football League Division 1
  - Winners: 2012, 2014, 2016
  - Runners-up: 2011, 2013, 2015
- United Football League Division 2
  - Winners: 2010

=== Cup ===
- PFF National Men's Club Championship
  - Winners: 2011
  - Runners-up: 2013–14, 2014–15
- UFL Cup
  - Winners: 2010, 2016
  - Runners-up: 2012
- UFL FA League Cup
  - Runners-up: 2014
- UFL FA Cup
  - Winners: 2014

== Records ==
Season	Division	Teams	League position	PFL Cup	PFF NMCC	UFL Cup	FA Cup	League Cup	Singapore Cup	AFC President's Cup	AFC Cup	AFC Champions League
2009	—	—	—	—	—	Group stage	—	—	—	—	—	—
2010	2 (P)	8	1st	—	—	1st	—	—	—	—	—	—
2011	1	7	2nd	—	1st	3rd	—	—	—	—	—	—
2012	1	10	1st	—	—	2nd	—	—	—	—	—	—
2013	1	10	2nd	—	Quarter-final	Quarter-final	—	—	4th	Group stage	—	—
2014	1	9	1st	—	2nd	—	1st	2nd	Preliminary round	—	—	—
2015	1	10	2nd	—	2nd	Group stage^{a}	—	—	4th	—	Group stage	—
2016	1	12	1st	—	—	1st	—	—	Quarter-final	—	—	—
2017	1	8	4th (regular season)	—	—	—	—	—	2nd	—	Zonal Semi-final	Preliminary 2
2017	1	8	2nd (final series)	—	—	—	—	—	2nd	—	Zonal Semi-final	Preliminary 2
2018	1	6	6th	Group stage	—	—	—	—	—	—	Group stage	—
2019	1	7	7th	—	—	—	—	—	—	—	—	—
Updated as of October 19, 2019

Note:

- a Global FC topped the group but were disqualified from the UFL Cup for fielding Satoshi Ōtomo as a Filipino player. It was ruled that the club hasdviolated the UFL's five-foreigner-rule. Matches of Global were originally decided to be forfeited after complaints from Ceres La-Salle FC, Kaya FC, Stallion FC, and Pachanga Diliman FC, but the decision was overturned after the Appeals Committee ruled that the complainants did not follow proper procedure for reversing match outcomes. Last placers Manila Nomads qualified for the next round as a result.

== Continental record ==
Season	Competition	Round	Club	Score		Agg. / pos.
Season	Competition	Round	Club	Home	Away	Agg. / pos.
2013	AFC President's Cup	Group stage	(Bhutan) Yeedzin	5–0		—
2013	AFC President's Cup	Group stage	(Pakistan) KRL	0–2		—
2013	AFC President's Cup	Group stage	(Kyrgyzstan) Dordoi Bishkek	1–6		—
2015	AFC Cup	Group stage	(Hong Kong) South China	1–6	0–3	3rd
2015	AFC Cup	Group stage	(Malaysia) Pahang FA	0–0	0–0	3rd
2015	AFC Cup	Group stage	(Myanmar) Yadanarbon	4–1	0–2	3rd
2017	AFC Champions League	Preliminary round 1	(Singapore) Tampines Rovers	2–0		—
2017	AFC Champions League	Preliminary round 2	(Australia) Brisbane Roar	0–6		—
2017	AFC Cup	Group stage	(Myanmar) Magwe FC	1–0	4–2	1st
2017	AFC Cup	Group stage	(Cambodia) Boeung Ket Angkor	3–1	2–0	1st
2017	AFC Cup	Group stage	(Malaysia) Johor Darul Ta'zim	3–2	0–4	1st
2017	AFC Cup	ASEAN Zonal semi-final	(Singapore) Home United	2–2	2–3	4–5
2018	AFC Cup	Group stage	(Vietnam) FLC Thanh Hóa	3–3	0–1	2nd
2018	AFC Cup	Group stage	(Indonesia) Bali United	1–1	3–1	2nd
2018	AFC Cup	Group stage	(Myanmar) Yangon United	2–1	0–3	2nd

=== Singapore Cup ===
Season	Round	Club	Venue	Score
2013	Preliminary round	(Singapore) Warriors FC	Away	2–0
2013	Quarter-final	(Brunei) DPMM FC	Neutral	1–0
2013	Quarter-final	(Brunei) DPMM FC	Neutral	4–4
2013	Semi-final	(Singapore) Tanjong Pagar United	Away	2–2
2013	Semi-final	(Singapore) Tanjong Pagar United	Away	1–2
2013	Battle for third	(Singapore) Balestier Khalsa	Away	0–1
2014	Preliminary round	(Brunei) DPMM FC	Home	0–7
2015	Preliminary round	(Singapore) Hougang United	Away	2–1 (a.e.t)
2015	Quarter-final	(Singapore) Geylang Int'l.	Away	0–1
2015	Quarter-final	(Singapore) Geylang Int'l.	Away	4–1 (a.e.t)
2015	Semi-final	(Japan) Albirex Niigata (S)	Neutral	0–1
2015	Semi-final	(Japan) Albirex Niigata (S)	Neutral	1–2
2015	Battle for third	(Brunei) DPMM FC	Neutral	1–3
2016	Preliminary round	(Cambodia) Nagaworld	Neutral	5–0
2016	Quarter-final	(Singapore) Tampines Rovers	Away	1–3
2016	Quarter-final	(Singapore) Tampines Rovers	Away	1–2
2017	Preliminary round	(Singapore) Geylang International	Away	4–4 (a.e.t); 3–2 (pen.)
2017	Quarter-final	(Cambodia) Boeung Ket Angkor	Neutral	3–1
2017	Quarter-final	(Cambodia) Boeung Ket Angkor	Neutral	1–2
2017	Semi-final	(Singapore) Hougang United	Away	2–2
2017	Semi-final	(Singapore) Hougang United	Away	2–1
2017	Final	(Japan) Albirex Niigata (S)	Neutral	2–2 (a.e.t); 1–3 (pen.)

=== AFC Club ranking ===
As of 19 February 2020 16:42:51 CET

Current rank	Country	Team
69	(Philippines)	Global Cebu F.C.
70	(Syria)	Al Jaish
71	(Qatar)	Al-Faisaly SC
72	(Qatar)	El Jaish
73	(Hong Kong)	Kitchee
