= UFL FA Charity Cup =

- Organizer(s): Football Alliance
- Founded: 2014
- Abolished: 2014
- Region: Philippines
- Teams: 6
- Most championships: Global (1 title)
- Broadcaster: AksyonTV

The United Football League Football Alliance Charity Cup was a Filipino association football competition. It was played on a knockout stage (single elimination). The only edition served as the last competition for the 2013–14 United Football League season which was participated by the top 6 clubs of UFL Division 1.

== Background ==
On 21 June 2012, UFL officials announced that it will introduce a new tournament to its calendar around May of the 2013 United Football League season. Originally, the UFL Super Cup was supposed to feature 10 teams from the UFL Division 1 and the top six clubs from its second division. A maximum of five foreign players would be allowed for each club during the inaugural tournament, and this number would be reduced to four players the succeeding years.

On 22 April 2014, it was officially announced that the planned UFL Super Cup will commence after the 2013 UFL season, and will be held annually after the end of each league competition. As for its participants, the top six clubs of the first division will compete in this knockout tournament. UFL president Randy Roxas said that the Super Cup was supposed to include foreign teams competing against the league and cup champions. However, he explained that inviting foreign teams became too expensive. The league champion and runner-up will receive byes to the cup's semi-finals, while the other four clubs will compete in two-legged knockout games.

== 2014 edition ==
2014 UFL FA Cup
Tournament details
- Country: Philippines
- Dates: July 12–26, 2014
- Teams: 6

Final positions
- Champions: Global
- Runners-up: Kaya

Tournament statistics
- Matches played: 10
- Goals scored: 41 (4.1 per match)
- Top goal scorer(s): (Australia) Thomas Taylor (5 goals)

The 2014 United Football League FA Charity Cup is the first and only edition of the tournament. The competition ran from July 12 to 26, 2014.

Global defeated Kaya 3–1 on July 26, 2014, at Rizal Memorial Stadium to capture the first and only UFL FA Cup title.

=== Competition format ===
The top six clubs of the 2014 United Football League competed for the cup.

=== Qualification ===
Top six clubs of the recently concluded 2014 United Football League qualified in this tournament.

- Global
- Kaya
- Loyola
- Stallion
- Green Archers United
- Pachanga Diliman

=== Results ===
All quarterfinal and semi-final matches will be played in two-legged contests, with scores carrying over from the first game into the second leg. Given that all matches will be held in one venue, there will be no away-goals rule. The quarterfinal round kicked off on July 12, 2014, at Rizal Memorial Stadium.

==== Quarter-finals ====
Team 1	Agg.	Team 2	1st leg	2nd leg
Kaya	8–2	Pachanga Diliman	4–1	4–1
Green Archers United	3–3 (1-3p)	Stallion	0–2	3–1(a.e.t.)

July 12, 2014	Kaya	4–1	Pachanga Diliman	Manila
15:15	Bedic 6'; Mbata 40'; Herrera 66'; Egba 82'	Report	Salenga 90'	Stadium: Rizal Memorial Stadium

July 12, 2014	Green Archers United	0–2	Stallion	Manila
18:45		Report	Clarino 35'; Nguene 38'	Stadium: Rizal Memorial Stadium

July 15, 2014	Stallion	1–3 (a.e.t.) (3–1 p)	Green Archers United	Manila
16:45	Clarino 118'	Report	Caligdong 89', 90+2'; Melliza 108'	Stadium: Rizal Memorial Stadium
	Penalties
	Alquiros (penalty scored); Nierras (penalty scored); Bateau (penalty scored)		(penalty scored) Caligdong

July 15, 2014	Pachanga Diliman	1–4	Kaya	Manila
20:15	Aranas 79'	Report	Barrera 18', 73'; Taylor 35'; Aranas 68' (o.g.)	Stadium: Rizal Memorial Stadium,

==== Semi-finals ====
Team 1	Agg.	Team 2	1st leg	2nd leg
Global	4–2	Stallion	1–2	3–0
Loyola	4–7	Kaya	3–4	1–3

July 19, 2014	Stallion	2–1	Global	Manila
15:15	Arboleda 25', 30'	Report	Kama 44'	Stadium: Rizal Memorial Stadium

July 19, 2014	Kaya	4–3	Loyola	Manila
18:45	Taylor 3', 35', 67'; Omura 90+1'	Report	P. Younghusband 45+2'; S. Greatwich 58'; J. Younghusband 61'	Stadium: Rizal Memorial Stadium

July 22, 2014	Loyola	1–3	Kaya	Manila
16:45	Gonzalez 90'	Report	Taylor 46'; Mbata 53', 75'	Stadium: Rizal Memorial Stadium

July 22, 2014	Stallion	0–3	Global	Manila
20:15		Report	Martinez 41'; Elhabib 58'; Mar. Hartmann 80'	Stadium: Rizal Memorial Stadium

==== Third place match ====
July 26, 2014	Stallion	2–2 (a.e.t.) (3–1 p)	Loyola	Manila
15:15	Thomert 22'; Alquiros 76'	Report	Caygill 24'; S. Greatwich 86'	Stadium: Rizal Memorial Stadium
	Penalties
	Clarino (penalty scored); Muñoz (penalty scored); Diop (penalty scored)		(penalty scored) S. Greatwich

==== Final ====
July 26, 2014	Global	3–1	Kaya	Manila
18:45	Mar. Hartmann 44', 67'; Elhabib 48'	Report	C. Greatwich 81'	Stadium: Rizal Memorial Stadium
