= East Visayas R.F.A. =

East Visayas Regional Football Association
- Abbreviation: EVRA
- Formation: 2003 (as FSL); 2009 (as LFA); 2017 (as EVRFA)
- Type: Football association
- Headquarters: Tacloban
- Region served: Eastern Visayas
- President: Dan Palami
- Parent organization: Philippine Football Federation
- Website: http://evrfa.org/

The East Visayas Regional Football Association (EVRFA) is the regional football association for the provinces of Eastern Visayas and is a regular member of the Philippine Football Federation.

== History ==
=== Futbol Sociedad de Tacloban/Leyte and Leyte FA ===
Logo as Leyte FA.

The Leyte Football Association was established on March 8, 2003 and was initially known as the Futbol Sociedad de Tacloban/Leyte (FSL). The FSL was formally reorganized as the Leyte Football Association on April 29, 2009 and elected its first officers as the LFA. Dan Palami was elected as the first LFA President. The LFA was admitted to the Philippine Football Federation (PFF) in November of the same year. The LFA became the 33rd regular member of the PFF on November 30, 2010.

=== East Visayas RFA ===
On March 22, 2017, Leyte F.A. reorganized itself to become a regional football association to comply with the statutes of the PFF. It renamed itself as the East Visayas Regional Football Association.
