= 2010 UFL Cup =

2010 United Football Cup
Tournament details
- Country: Philippines
- Teams: 19

Final positions
- Champions: Global FC (1st title)
- Runners-up: Philippine Air Force

Tournament statistics
- Top goal scorer(s): (Sudan) Izzeldin Elhabbib (8 goals)

Awards
- Best player: (Philippines) Aly Borromeo

The 2010 United Football Cup was the second edition of the United Football Cup, a Philippine football tournament, that ran from October 16, 2010 to January 22, 2011. This edition consisted of 19 teams, which were separated into four groups with a single round-robin played in each to divide the groups into top-two and bottom-two clusters. The top two of every group qualified for the knock-out stage while the bottom-two clubs of each set, however, battled for the Plate. The eight teams who made it to the knock-out stages were given the right of playing in the league first division while teams who played for the Plate proceeded to the league second division.

Kaya were originally part of Group C. However, they withdrew from the cup. In accordance with Article 39 Section 1 of the UFL Rules and Regulations, Kaya were fined P200,000 for their move. They were replaced by Philippine Navy in Group C.

Global FC defeated Philippine Air Force to secure their first title while Loyola beat Pasargad in the plate finals.

== Group stage ==
Key to colours in group tables
Group winners and runners-up advance to the knock out stage
Third-placed teams that will proceed on the Plate Battle

All times are Philippine Standard Time (PST) – UTC+8.

=== Group A ===
Team	Pld	W	D	L	GF	GA	GD	Pts
Philippine Air Force	3	2	0	1	15	5	+10	6
Manila Sudanese Club	3	1	1	1	5	5	0	4
Pasargad	3	1	1	1	6	12	−6	4
Laos FC	3	1	0	2	6	10	−4	3

October 17, 2010	Laos FC	2 – 1	Manila Sudanese Club	Muntinlupa
15:00				Stadium: Alabang Country Club Field A

October 24, 2010	Pasargad	4 – 3	Laos FC	Muntinlupa
				Stadium: Alabang Country Club

October 31, 2010	Manila Sudanese Club	1 – 1	Pasargad	Muntinlupa
				Stadium: Alabang Country Club

November 4, 2010	Philippine Air Force	8 – 1	Pasargad

December 17, 2010	Philippine Air Force	5 – 1	Laos FC	Parañaque
		Details		Stadium: Nomads Football Field

December 19, 2010	Manila Sudanese Club	3 – 2	Philippine Air Force

=== Group B ===
Team	Pld	W	D	L	GF	GA	GD	Pts
Stallions FC	4	3	1	0	12	3	+9	10
Manila Nomads	4	2	1	1	8	9	−1	7
Union Internacional Manila	4	2	0	2	12	13	−1	6
Green Archers United^{‡}	4	1	1	2	3	4	−1	4
Manila All-Japan	4	1	0	3	9	15	−6	3

- ^{‡} Green Archers moved to the plate semi-finals for some unknown reasons.

October 24, 2010	Union Internacional Manila	0 – 1	Green Archers United	Muntinlupa
				Stadium: Alabang Country Club

October 31, 2010	Stallions FC	5 – 0	Union Internacional Manila	Parañaque
				Stadium: Nomads Football Field

October 31, 2010	Manila Nomads	2 – 1	Manila All-Japan	Parañaque
				Stadium: Nomads Football Field

November 7, 2010	Stallions FC	0 – 0	Green Archers United

November 7, 2010	Manila All-Japan	5 – 8	Union Internacional Manila

November 18, 2010	Manila Nomads	3 – 4	Stallions FC	Parañaque
20:30				Stadium: Nomads Football Field

November 28, 2010	Manila Nomads	2 – 4	Union Internacional Manila	Parañaque
16:00				Stadium: Nomads Football Field

November 28, 2010	Manila All-Japan	3 – 2	Green Archers United	Muntinlupa
15:00				Stadium: Alabang Country Club

December 5, 2010	Stallions FC	3 – 0	Manila All-Japan

December 17, 2010	Manila Nomads	1 – 0	Green Archers United	Makati
	Borrill 18'	Details		Stadium: University of Makati Stadium

=== Group C ===
Team	Pld	W	D	L	GF	GA	GD	Pts
Philippine Army	3	3	0	0	13	2	+11	9
Philippine Navy	3	2	0	1	6	1	+5	6
Manila Lions	3	0	1	2	2	7	−5	1
Sunken Garden United	3	0	1	2	0	11	−11	1

October 17, 2010	Manila Lions	0 – 0	Sunken Garden United	Muntinlupa
13:00				Stadium: Alabang Country Club Field B

October 31, 2010	Philippine Army	8 – 0	Sunken Garden United	Muntinlupa
				Stadium: Alabang Country Club Field

October 31, 2010	Philippine Navy	3 – 0	Manila Lions	Muntinlupa
				Stadium: Alabang Country Club Field

November 7, 2010	Philippine Army	4 – 2	Manila Lions

November 7, 2010	Philippine Navy	3 – 0	Sunken Garden United

December 17, 2010	Philippine Army	1 – 0	Philippine Navy
	Gempisaw	Details

=== Group D ===
Team	Pld	W	D	L	GF	GA	GD	Pts
Union	4	4	0	0	14	1	+13	12
Global	4	3	0	1	15	3	+12	9
Loyola	4	2	0	2	8	7	+1	6
Dolphins United	4	1	0	3	3	11	−9	3
Mama Africa FC	4	0	0	4	3	21	−18	0

October 16, 2010	Loyola	4 – 2	Dolphins United	Makati
17:00				Stadium: University of Makati Stadium

October 16, 2010	Union	6 – 0	Mama Africa FC	Muntinlupa
15:00				Stadium: Alabang Country Club Field B

October 24, 2010	Mama Africa FC	2 – 4	Loyola	Muntinlupa
				Stadium: Alabang Country Club Field

October 31, 2010	Global	2 – 0	Dolphins United	Parañaque
				Stadium: Nomads Football Field

October 31, 2010	Loyola	0 – 1	Union	Muntinlupa
				Stadium: Alabang Country Club Field

November 7, 2010	Global	1 – 2	Union

November 7, 2010	Dolphins United	1 – 0	Mama Africa FC

November 18, 2010	Global	2 – 0	Loyola	Makati
20:30				Stadium: University of Makati Stadium

November 28, 2010	Dolphins United	0 – 5	Union

December 5, 2010	Global	10 – 1	Mama Africa FC

== Quarter-finals ==
Quarter-finals
January 9 – Muntinlupa
Philippine Army	4
Manila Nomads	1
January 9 – Muntinlupa
Stallions FC	0
Global	1
January 9 – Muntinlupa
Philippine Air Force	4
Philippine Navy	2
January 9 – Muntinlupa
Union	2
Manila Sudanese Club	0

Semi-finals
January 16 – Muntinlupa
Philippine Army	0
Global (a.e.t.)	1
January 16 – Muntinlupa
Philippine Air Force (p)	1 (4)
Union	1 (3)

Final
January 22 – Makati
Global	3
Philippine Air Force	2

=== Finals ===
January 22, 2011	Global	3 – 2	Philippine Air Force	Makati
16:00	I. El-Habbib 39', 87'; Bahadoran 66'	Details	Araneta 70' (pen.), 85'	Stadium: University of Makati Stadium

== Plate Semi-finals ==
Semi-finals
January 16 – Muntinlupa
Pasargad (p)
Green Archers United
January 16 – Muntinlupa
Loyola	1
Manila Lions	0

Final
January 22 – Makati
Pasargad	1
Loyola	2

=== Plate Finals ===
January 22, 2011	Pasargad	1 – 2	Loyola	Makati
	Mohammadpour 37'	Details	Valeroso 41'; Merida 79'	Stadium: University of Makati Stadium
