= Dragutin Stević-Ranković =

Serbian footballer

Personal information
- Full name: Dragutin Stević-Ranković
- Date of birth: 19 December 1979 (age 46)
- Place of birth: Lazarevac, SFR Yugoslavia
- Height: 6 ft 1 in (1.85 m)
- Position: Striker

Senior career*
Years	Team	Apps	(Gls)
1996–1999	Polet Mirosaljci	130	(70)
2000–2002	Kolubara	30	(7)
2002–2003	Loznica	18	(5)
2003–2004	Čukarički	8	(2)
2004–2005	BSK Borča	15	(6)
2004-2005	Mladenovac	5	(1)
2005–2006	Kitchee	16	(4)
2006–2007	HK Rangers	8	(4)
Total		230	(99)

Managerial career
- 2018: Global Makati
- 2019: United Makati
- * Club domestic league appearances and goals

Dragutin Stevic-Ranković (born 19 December 1979) is a former professional footballer. Born in Serbia, he began his career there and later moved to Hong Kong where he lives with his wife and two boys.

As of 2020, he is a senior football coach for Tekkerz HK, based in Discovery Bay, Hong Kong who specialise in maximum touch training.

== Playing career ==
As a youth, Stević-Ranković played with FK Kolubara in his hometown of Lazarevac, Serbia. He then worked his way up the ladder in Serbian professional football, making stops at FK Polet Mirosaljci, FK Loznica, FK Čukarički, FK BSK Borča and OFK Mladenovac.

In 2005, Stević-Ranković signed a contract with Kitchee SC of the Hong Kong First Division. The club won the Hong Kong League Cup that season. He memorably scored in the 30th minute of a 1:0 win in the cup semi-final.

In 2006, Dragutin moved to Rangers (HKG). While there, he had perhaps his finest match as a professional footballer in Hong Kong, scoring three goals against Citizen AA on 11 May 2006. Unfortunately, his time with the club was cut short by a left knee injury sustained in a game on 15 October 2006.

The injury was serious. Despite two operations, he had to retire from playing professional football.

Stević-Ranković completed his UEFA 'A' Licence in Serbia in 2015.

== Coaching career ==
As a UEFA 'A' Licence Dragutin Stević-Ranković signed with Global Makati in 2018. He took over a club who had not won a game all season, they had the lowest scoring ratio and highest goals conceded of any Philippines Premier League team and were sitting rock bottom of the table. After Stević-Ranković became the head coach, fortunes began to change as he started to implement changes and the positive impact was recognized immediately, they started to score more and concede less and results were improving drastically. They also had some positive results in the domestic cup (Copa Paulino Alcantara) which was recognized by the Filipino media outlets and this was attributed to the positive impact of Stević-Ranković becoming the head coach.

Come the end of the season a new contract was offered, however even though he maintains a great relationship with the club and staff, due to the club's financial issues Stević-Ranković declined the offer and moved back to Hong Kong where he is a highly sought after coach. He has coached the YMCA of Hong Kong Christian College football team since 2009 winning numerous accolades along the way.

== Honours ==
- Hong Kong League Cup: 2005-2006
