= Leyte frog =

Leyte frog may refer to:

- Leyte slender stream frog (Hylarana albotuberculata), a frog in the family Ranidae endemic to the islands of Leyte, Samar, and Mindanao in the Philippines
- Leyte tree frog (Philautus leitensis), a frog in the family Rhacophoridae endemic to the Philippines
