= Darryl Roberts =

Trinidadian footballer (born 1983)

Personal information
- Full name: Darryl Roberts
- Date of birth: 26 September 1983 (age 43)
- Place of birth: Saint Joseph, Trinidad and Tobago
- Height: 1.85 m (6 ft 1 in)
- Position: Striker

Youth career
- 1998–2001: Fatima College
- 2002–2005: Liberty Flames

Senior career*
Years	Team	Apps	(Gls)
2004–2006	Carolina Dynamo	32	(22)
2007–2008	Sparta Rotterdam	34	(9)
2008–2011	Denizlispor	80	(15)
2012	Charlotte Eagles	17	(6)
2012–2013	Samsunspor	25	(2)
2014	Roi Et United	20	(11)
2015– 2016	Ubon UMT United	69	(38)
2017–2018	Global Cebu	37	(16)
2019	Kaya–Iloilo	19	(5)
2020	Azkals Development Team	0	(0)
2020–2021	HPC	27	(6)

International career^{‡}
2004–2013	Trinidad and Tobago	29	(6)
- * Club domestic league appearances and goals as of 2 July 2015 ‡ National team caps and goals as of 11 June 2013

Darryl Bevon Roberts (born 26 September 1983, in Saint Joseph) is a Trinidadian footballer who last played for Kaya F.C–Iloilo and for the Trinidad and Tobago national team.

== Club career ==
=== Youth and amateur ===
In Trinidad and Tobago, he attended El Dorado Junior Secondary school however than transferred to Fatima College (Secondary School) in 1998. He represented both schools at age divisional levels and Fatima College at the Intercol competition and North Zone league. Roberts attended Liberty University. In his first year, he was named Soccer America and College Soccer News Freshman All-American, was on the NSCAA South Atlantic All-Region second team honours, and was also named Big South Freshman of the Year and to the Big South All-Conference first team.

In his sophomore year he earned Big South all-conference second team honours and was a VaSID All-State second team selection, was named to the Trinidad and Tobago national football team in spring of 2003, becoming the first Liberty student-athlete to ever be named to a full national team. Roberts came to play in the United States in his late high school years. He was brought to High Point, NC to play for Trinidadian Anton Corneal's club '83 PSA Stars with future NCAA players Dane Brenner (USF), Osei Telesford (Liberty University, Chicago Fire), Hub Orr (Duke), Cliff Wright (Centre College), and Jordan Shaver (Hampden-Sydney).In his junior year he was an NSCAA South Atlantic All-Region second team selection, he was named to VaSID All-State second team and he also earned Big South all-conference second team honours. He is second on the Liberty all-time points list, and third in all time goals. While at Liberty, Roberts also played for Carolina Dynamo in the USL Premier Development League.

=== Club ===
Roberts was drafted by Toronto FC as the 14th overall pick of the 2007 MLS Supplemental Draft, but chose to move to Europe with Sparta Rotterdam instead. Toronto held his MLS rights for 2 seasons. However, he decided to look for opportunities in Europe and signed with Sparta Rotterdam. Roberts debuted for Sparta on 1 April 2007, in a home match against SC Heerenveen. Within two minutes he scored his first goal. His first full season also proved to be his last, then Sparta technical director Danny Blind deemed him surplus to requirements in April 2008.

He signed a 3-year contract with Süper Lig team Denizlispor on 9 July 2008. In three years at the club Roberts appeared in 80 league matches and scored 15 goals. After playing with the Charlotte Eagles for the second half of their 2012 season, Roberts returned to Turkey when he signed a two-year deal with Samsunspor in August 2012.

Roberts also played in the Philippines Football League. For played for Global Cebu and later Kaya-Iloilo. He left Kaya-Iloilo in January 2020.

== International career ==
Roberts made his debut for the Soca Warriors in a January 2007 CONCACAF Gold Cup qualifying match against Barbados. He scored his first international goal against Martinique on 15 January 2007, in the 2007 Digicel Cup. His most recent goal came against Barbados on 6 September 2011, in a 2014 FIFA World Cup qualifier.

=== International goals ===
Scores and results list T&T's goal tally first.

#	Date	Venue	Opponent	Score	Result	Competition
1	15 January 2007	Port of Spain	Martinique	1–0	5–1	2007 Digicel Cup
2	23 June 2008	Hamilton	Bermuda	1–0	2–0	2010 FIFA World Cup qualifier
3	8 October 2008	Port of Spain	Dominican Republic	9–0	9–0	Friendly
4	21 August 2011	Port of Spain	India	2–0	3–0	Friendly
5	21 August 2011	Port of Spain	India	3–0	3–0	Friendly
6	6 September 2011	St. Michael	Barbados	2–0	2–0	2014 FIFA World Cup qualification
