= Misagh Bahadoran =

Filipino footballer

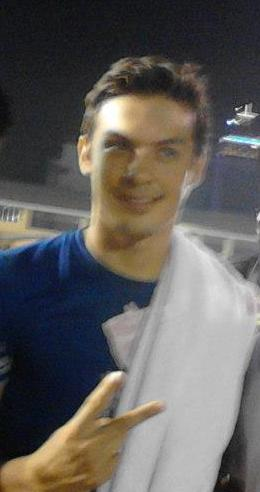
- Bahadoran at the Cebu City Sports Complex

Personal information
- Full name: Misagh Medina Bahadoran
- Date of birth: January 10, 1987 (age 39)
- Place of birth: Mabalacat, Philippines
- Height: 1.74 m (5 ft 9 in)
- Positions: Winger; forward

Youth career
- 2006–2009: Pasargad

Senior career*
Years	Team	Apps	(Gls)
2009–2010	Pasargad		
2010–2011	Kaya		
2011–2017	Global Cebu	39	(24)
2018–2019	Perak	10	(0)
2020	Global	3	(0)
2020–2021	Maharlika Manila		
2024	One Taguig	1	(0)

International career
2007–2012	Philippines (futsal)		
2011–2018	Philippines	58	(8)
- * Club domestic league appearances and goals

Misagh Medina Bahadoran (Persian: میثاق بهادران, romanized: Mithāq Bahāderan; born January 10, 1987) is a Filipino former professional footballer who played as a winger or forward. He played for the Philippines' national teams in football and futsal.

== Early life and education ==
Bahadoran's father, Mostafa, is Iranian and his mother is Kapampangan Filipino. He is the third of seven children. He was raised in Tehran, Iran. At age 7, Bahadoran started to play football and dreamed to be a professional footballer. However, he was discouraged from playing football by his father after his eldest brother, a professional footballer, had a career-ending injury. However Bahadoran continued playing football in secret.

Bahadoran was sent to Philippines by his father in 2004 to finish his high school studies in Pampanga. The relative lack of awareness on football in the Philippines limited Bahadoran's options in getting involved in the sport. When Bahadoran entered Centro Escolar University in Manila, he and his foreign classmate successfully petitioned the school administration to convert a basketball court into a futsal court.

At the end of the 2010–11 school year, Bahadoran graduated from Centro Escolar University in Manila, with a degree in Dentistry; he is currently a qualified dentist with his own practice.

== Club career ==
=== Pasargad ===
Bahadoran first participated at the United Football League in 2009 as a player for Pasargad.

=== Kaya ===
In 2010, he then later moved to Kaya.

=== Global Cebu ===
In 2011, he was asked to try out for the Tokyo Verdy, after failing his try out for the Japanese club, he joined United Football League (UFL) club Global. Bahadoran helped Global win three UFL league titles, a UFL Cup title, and a UFL FA Cup title.

He remained with Global, when the club renamed itself as Global Cebu and moved to the Philippines Football League (PFL).

=== Perak FA ===
Bahadoran was set to transfer to Kelantan FA but later decided to sign up with Perak TBG F.C. instead on December 28, 2017. Bahadoran's contract was terminated with the Malaysia Super League club in May 2018 after a short stint under Perak head coach Mehmet Durakovic.

=== Brief return to Global and joining Maharlika ===
In February 2020, Bahadoran returned to Global ahead of the 2020 PFL season. Bahadoran signed the lowest deal in his career to help a club he had played for before, but he and other players had to deal with issues relating to unpaid wages and uncertainties over club's management.

In August 2020, Bahadoran had hinted possibilities of playing for Maharlika, a club aspiring to enter the PFL in the 2020 season, which had been postponed due to the COVID-19 pandemic, at the earliest. By the end of the month, Bahadoran had formalized his move to the club, which was granted a provisional license to play in the PFL on September 1.

=== One Taguig ===
In 2024, Bahadoran joined One Taguig of the Philippines Football League.

== International career ==
Bahadoran first got called up to the Philippines squad in 2007, but his father urged him not to play for the team due to conflicts with his studies. After graduating from university in 2011, his father allowed him to pursue football and was again called up to the national team. He was eventually named in the final squad for the 2014 FIFA World Cup qualification first round against Sri Lanka. However, over the two-legged match, he was not able to get his debut. As the Philippines advanced to the second round qualifiers against Kuwait, he made his debut in the first-leg, coming on as a substitute for Ángel Guirado in the second minute of second half stoppage time in a 3–0 defeat. In the second-leg, he came on as an 80th-minute substitute for Guirado but was not able to help the Philippines make a comeback as they lost 2–1.

On 11 June 2015, he scored his first international goal in a 2–1 win for the 2018 FIFA World Cup qualification second round against Bahrain. Five days later, he scored the Philippines' first goal in a 2–0 win over Yemen.

== Futsal ==
During his college years, Bahadoran was widely involved in futsal rather than football so he could manage his studies better. In 2006, Bahadoran started to play for the Philippines national futsal team.

== 7's football ==
In early 2019, Bahadoran joined Manila side Laro FC which played seven-a-side football in the 7's Football League that is known for having had players such as Anton del Rosario, Daniel Matsunaga, Alexander Borromeo, and Simon Greatwich. Bahadoran represented the Philippines national team at the Asia 7s Championship in 2024.

== Outside football ==
=== Personal life ===
Since December 2015, Bahadoran had been dating Filipina actress and model Sam Pinto. The couple split in 2018.

In November 2016, Bahadoran still hadn't practiced dentistry due to his focusing on his football career, though he was planning to launch his dental clinic in December. As of the same month, he also runs a food joint called MelMac Peri Peri Express.

Bahadoran is also the owner of Global Elite Dental Clinic in Makati.

In 2024, Bahadoran and his business partners announced the development of a sports stadium in Bacoor.

=== Sponsorship ===
Bahadoran is outfitted by American sportswear supplier Nike.

== Career statistics ==
=== Club ===
Appearances and goals by club, season and competition
Club	Season	League			Cup		Continental^{1}		Other		Total	
Club	Season	Division	Apps	Goals	Apps	Goals	Apps	Goals	Apps	Goals	Apps	Goals
Global Cebu	2011	United Football League	0	0	0	0	–		–		0	0
Global Cebu	2012	United Football League	8	1	0	0	–		–		8	1
Global Cebu	2013	United Football League	17	14	5	2	3	1	–		25	17
Global Cebu	2014	United Football League	16	7	1	0	–		–		17	7
Global Cebu	2015	United Football League	11	6	6	0	4	1	–		21	7
Global Cebu	2016	United Football League	14	14	3	1	–		–		17	15
Global Cebu	2017	Philippines Football League	0	0	4	1	7	2	3	0	14	3
Global Cebu	Total		66	42	19	4	14	4	3	0	102	50
Perak	2018	Malaysia Super League	11	0	0	0	–		–		11	0
Career total			77	42	19	4	14	4	3	0	113	50

^{1}Including AFC Champions League, AFC Cup and AFC President's Cup

=== International ===
Philippines national team
Year	Apps	Goals
2011	5	0
2012	14	0
2013	4	0
2014	13	0
2015	7	2
2016	7	4
2017	3	1
2018	2	0
Total	55	7

==== International goals ====
Scores and results list the Philippines' goal tally first.

#	Date	Venue	Opponent	Score	Result	Competition
2015
1.	11 June 2015	Philippine Sports Stadium, Bocaue	Bahrain	1–0	2–1	2018 FIFA World Cup qualification
2.	16 June 2015	Suheim Bin Hamad Stadium, Doha	Yemen	1–0	2–0	2018 FIFA World Cup qualification
2016
3.	29 March 2016	Rizal Memorial Stadium, Manila	North Korea	1–0	3–2	2018 FIFA World Cup qualification
4.	6 September 2016	Dolen Omurzakov Stadium, Bishkek	Kyrgyzstan	2–0	2–1	Friendly
5.	9 November 2016	Rizal Memorial Stadium, Manila	Kyrgyzstan	1–0	1–0	Friendly
6.	22 November 2016	Philippine Sports Stadium, Bocaue	Indonesia	1–1	2–2	2016 AFF Championship
2017
7.	7 June 2017	Tianhe Stadium, Guangzhou	China	1–2	1–8	Friendly
2018
8.	3 October 2018	Sylhet District Stadium, Sylhet	Laos	3–0	3–1	2018 Bangabandhu Cup

== Honours ==
=== Club ===
Global

- UFL Division 1: 2012; Runner-up 2013

=== International ===
- AFC Challenge Cup: Third 2012
- Philippine Peace Cup: 2012, 2013
