= United Football League (Philippines) =

Defunct association football league in Metro Manila, Philippines

- Organising body: Football Alliance; United Football Clubs Association
- Founded: 2009
- Folded: 2016
- Country: Philippines
- Confederation: AFC
- Number of clubs: 12
- Level on pyramid: 1
- Relegation to: UFL Division 2
- Domestic cup: UFL Cup
- League cup(s): UFL FA League Cup; UFL FA Charity Cup
- International cup: AFC Cup
- Last champions: Global (3rd title) (2016)
- Most championships: Global (3 titles)

The United Football League, commonly known as the UFL, was an association football league, replaced by the Philippines Football League, based in the National Capital Region of the Philippines, governed by the Football Alliance (FA) in partnership with United Football Clubs Association (UFCA). The UFL was the Philippines' primary football league. In its last season in 2016, it was contested by 12 clubs and operated without a system of promotion and relegation with UFL Division 2, which was discontinued. Games were often scheduled on Tuesdays, Thursdays, Saturdays, and Sundays. To avoid the country's rainy season, the league usually kicked off sometime between the months of January and February each year.

The league started as a semi-professional tournament in 2009. For its inaugural season, the first UFL Cup, sanctioned by both the Philippine Football Federation and National Capital Region Football Association, was held in 2009 to determine the clubs that would participate in the league. Since then, it has been described as a thriving football league, organized by former football players and aficionados. A total of 20 clubs have competed in the UFL since its founding. It was organized by the Football Alliance, whose long-term goal is the continued development of football in the Philippines through a premier league.

Four clubs have been crowned league champions: Global (3), Philippine Air Force (2), Stallion (1), and Ceres (1). The last champions were Global, which won their third title in the 2016 season.

== Structure and competition ==
The league was composed of two divisions, both with clubs playing a double round-robin format. During the course of a season, which commences sometime in January, each team plays every other club twice for a total of 18 games. However, during the 2014 season, the first division implemented a triple round-robin system, which increased the games from 18 to 24. Like most football leagues around the world, it adopts the standard point system wherein match winners receive three points and losers get none. Each club receives a point, on the other hand, if the match ends in a draw. At the end of each season, the team with the most points was crowned league champion. For clubs that were level in points, the following tie-breakers were applied:

1. Goal difference for the entire season
2. Total goals scored for the entire season
3. Head-to-head results (total points)
4. Head-to-head goals scored
5. Head-to-head away goals scored
6. Total away goals scored for the entire season

=== Promotion and relegation ===
Since the start of the 2013 season, a new promotion-relegation system has been adopted by the league. The club that finishes second in UFL Division 2 also had a chance of being promoted via a two-legged aggregate-goal playoff against the ninth-place team in the first division, similar to the system used in the Bundesliga. For the 2015 season, a single team in UFL Division 1, Pasargad, was relegated to the second division. Further, the top two clubs from the latter, Ceres and Manila Jeepney, were both promoted to the first division. Before the start of this season, Manila Nomads' decided to voluntarily step down from the first division to play in UFL Division 2, citing its inability to comply with the league's foreigner cap rule.

With the discontinuation of the UFL Division 2 in the 2016 season, the adoption of the promotion and relegation system has been ceased.

Below is a complete record of the number of clubs that have played in the first division throughout the league's history.

- 2010: 8 clubs
- 2011: 7 clubs
- 2012–2013: 10 clubs
- 2014: 9 clubs
- 2015: 10 clubs (reduced to 9 midway through the season)
- 2016: 12 clubs (reduced to 9 midway through the season)

=== Qualification for Asian competitions ===
In January 2013, Global FC chairman Dan Palami posted a picture via Twitter of the letter of approval from Asian Football Confederation general secretary Dato Alex Soosay of his club's participation to the 2013 AFC President's Cup, which was scheduled from 2 to 12 May 2013 for the group stage. The team's participation marked the first time that the UFL and the Philippines sent a team in the cup to compete against clubs such as Taiwan Power Company, Hilal Al-Quds, and FC Dordoi Bishkek, to name a few. Global qualified and was chosen to represent the country after winning the league title in the 2012 season. However, for the 2014 AFC President's Cup, instead of the UFL, the PFF–Smart National Club Championship served as the qualifiers for the country's representative. Ceres, the 2013 PFF–Smart National Club Championship champions, represented the Philippines in the 2014 edition of the tournament.

In December 2014, Philippine Football Federation president Mariano Araneta, Jr. announced that the Philippines has been allocated a couple of slots for the 2015 AFC Cup. UFL club Global FC has been assigned an automatic slot for winning the 2014 UFL Division 1 league championship. 2014 FA League Cup champions Ceres FC, on the other hand, entered the 2015 AFC Cup play-off round against Maldivian football club Maziya.

Starting the 2015 season, the United Football League champion automatically qualified for the group stages of the AFC Cup, while the UFL Cup champion earned an AFC Cup playoff spot. In the event that the league and cup champions are the same club, the AFC Cup playoff spot went to the runner-up of the league competition.

== Format ==
Season	League	Cup	FA League Cup	FA Charity Cup
1	2010	2009	–	–
2	2011	2010	-	-
3	2012	2011	–	–
4	2013	2012	–	–
5	2014	2013	–	2014
6	2015	2015	-	–
7	2016	2016	–	–

Originally, the regular season of the UFL was composed of two competitions, namely: the United Football Cup, a single-elimination tournament that allows clubs to participate regardless of their division, and a domestic league. The latter is composed of separate round-robin tournaments for clubs in the first and second divisions. This is similar to the season schedule of the Philippine Basketball Association, which currently follows a three-conference format in a single season. The cup competition used to run from November to December of each year, while the league ran from January to July. Thus, these two competitions used to happen in separate calendar years. Since then, UFL officials have continuously introduced new formats, schedules, and tournaments to align the league calendar with those in the ASEAN region.

Beginning the 2015 season, the football season in the Philippines starts around September of each year with the FA League Cup. Further, the league and the UFL Cup both kick off sometime between the months of January and February every year, and these two competitions would be played simultaneously. Each season ends with the FA Cup, considered the culminating tournament of the UFL. This shift was done to align the UFL calendar with the football leagues in Southeast Asia and to avoid possible conflicts with the schedule of the Philippines national football team.

The schedule of the UFL and its competitions was once again shifted for the 2016 season. The season now begins with the UFL Cup in February, with the league competition set to begin in April. Unlike most football leagues around the world where the league and cup competitions run concurrently, the UFL reverted to having one competition after another. Additionally, the FA Cup and the FA League Cup have been discontinued.

=== UFL Cup ===
The United Football League Cup, also known as the UFL Cup, is an association football competition in the Philippines that starts every January or February. It is the first competition in the United Football League season. The cup is a single-elimination tournament where all of the clubs in the UFL were eligible to compete.

The UFL Cup was first held in October 2009, sanctioned by the National Capital Region Football Association (NCRFA) and the Philippine Football Federation (PFF). The cup was originally formed to determine the distribution of clubs over the first and second divisions in its inaugural season. Philippine Air Force was the inaugural cup champions, defeating Philippine Army, 2–1. For the 2012 cup, 28 clubs competed in four groups of five and in two separate stages. Clubs from UFL Division 2, along with other guest teams, participated in the first stage of the cup. Teams from UFL Division 1, on the other hand, played during the second stage. After, the top 10 clubs moved on to the knockout stage of the 2013 PFF National Men's Club Championship. Stallion FC defeated Global FC in the finals of the said cup with a score of 2–1. Stallion FC captain Ruben Doctora, Jr. and Rufo Sánchez scored one goal apiece to upset Global.

Club	Won	Runner-up	Years won	Years runner-up
Philippine Air Force	2	1	2011, 2009	2010
Global FC	1	1	2010	2012
Loyola Meralco Sparks	1	1	2013	2011
Kaya	1		2015	
Stallion FC	1		2012	
Ceres		1		2015
Pachanga Diliman		1		2013
Philippine Army		1		2009

=== Other cup tournaments ===
Aside from the main UFL Cup, two other competitions were held as part of the UFL regular season; these are the UFL FA Charity Cup and the UFL FA League Cup. Both tournaments were only held once in 2014. The UFL FA Charity Cup was part of the 2013–14 ULF season, which featured the top six teams in the 2013 league competition while the UFL FA League Cup was part of the 2014–15 UFL season and featured both teams from Division 1 and 2.

Tournament	UFL season	Winner	Score	Runners–up	Venue
UFL FA League Cup	2013–14	Ceres	2–1	Global	Rizal Memorial Stadium
UFL FA Cup	2014–15	Global	3–1	Kaya	Rizal Memorial Stadium

== History ==
=== Origins and foundation ===
As early as 2002, the United Football League operated not as a months-long league but as regular series of tournaments held during the weekends.

In September 2009, with the aim of reviving the interest of Filipinos in the sport, the Football Alliance, composed of Santi Araneta, Randy Roxas, Phil Hagedorn, Javier Mantecon, Dong Longa, Mike Camahort, Monchu Garcia, and Christopher Hagedorn, discussed the possibility of creating a football league in the Philippines. At the time, the Filipino Premier League, the country's top level football league governed by the Philippine Football Federation, has already been discontinued after its inaugural season. But instead of creating a whole system and competition, the United Football Clubs Association agreed to partner with the Football Alliance in operating the United Football League, which was by then a semi-professional league.

=== Corporate backing and sponsorship ===
Local courier company LBC became the principal sponsor of the UFL in 2009

The first season of the United Football League, officially named then as LBC United Football League for sponsorship reasons, was made possible with the aid of several local companies, namely: LBC Express Inc., Magma Inflatables, 2GO, Mutual Fund Management Corp., Orient Freight, and ATR Kim Eng.

Since its inception, UFL Division 1 has received corporate sponsorship. After air cargo delivery service company LBC Express Inc. committed as its principal sponsor in October 2009, the league kicked off as a premier tournament composed of several football teams around the nation.

- 2009–2011: LBC (LBC United Football League)

=== Founding members ===
The inaugural year of the league was held in the 2010 season, and was originally composed of 16 local clubs. The 16 founding teams of the league were the following:

Diliman; Global; Green Archers United; Kaya	Loyola Agila; Mama Africa; Manila All-Japan; Manila Lions	Manila Nomads; Mendiola United; Philippine Air Force; Philippine Army	Philippine Navy; Sunken Garden United; Union Internacional Manila; United South

=== Expansion year and TV coverage ===
After the end of 2011 season, AKTV became the league's new TV partner with the signing of a P150 million (~$3.4 million), 5-year deal with two live matches every week. Seven new clubs also entered the league after its successful third season of United Football Cup. Agila FC, Cebu Queen City, Diliman, Forza FC, Laos FC, Pachanga, and Team Socceroo participated in the UFL Division 2, which started on 14 January 2012. Three clubs from the second division were also promoted to the first division, namely: Nomads, Pasargad, and Stallion.

In December 2011, UFL president Randy Roxas entered into discussions with the Philippine Football Federation regarding the possibility of sending the league champions to the AFC President's Cup, a regional club competition that is run by the Asian Football Confederation. In addition, Pasargad represented the league and the Philippines in the 2013 AFC Futsal Club Championship qualifiers.

The league struck a deal to use the artificial pitch that was constructed by real estate giant Megaworld Corporation at McKinley Hill, Taguig City in April 2012. The field was then known as the McKinley Hill Football Field. Work on the football field was set to be completed by September of the same year, just in time for the start of the 2013 season. This was followed by the construction of a grandstand that accommodates 2,000 people.

=== Stadium and officiating developments ===
UFL president Randy Roxas announced in December 2012 the completion of the McKinley Hill football field in Fort Bonifacio, Taguig. The $1-million artificial pitch became the new home of the league starting the 2013 season. The field was built in partnership with Megaworld Corporation, and is said to be up to FIFA standards. The first two weeks of the tournament, which included the opening games scheduled on 5 February 2013, were still played at the Rizal Memorial Football Stadium, but most of the matches of the league were played at the said artificial pitch after the Chinese New Year.

The UFL started to use Megaworld's Emperador Stadium on 9 February 2013. The first league game in the stadium, Dolphins United versus Cebu Queen City United, got cancelled as the latter forfeited the match. The second match slated for the same day, Philippine Air Force against Nomads FC, became the first official league game in the stadium. Nomads FC won, 1–0, against Philippine Air Force.

In an effort to hold matches outside Metro Manila, United Football League marketing manager Coco Torre confirmed on 30 January 2013 that the league entered into discussions with its broadcast partner, AKTV, on the possibility of staging a few games in the provinces. During this time, UFL assistant technical director Ritchie Gannaban said that they considered staging at least two provincial matches during the second round of the 2013 season, which was supposed to be played either at the Cebu City Sports Complex, Cebu City or at Panaad Stadium, Bacolod.

In cooperation with the Philippine Football Federation, the league directed its referees to undergo a training module to better their decision making and player management. The training was facilitated by Football Association of Singapore committee member Augustine Arlando, a former FIFA match official, and Football Association national referee tutor Dave Roberts.

=== Refinements in league structure ===
In November 2013, the UFL started charging for admission during the knockout stages of the 2013 cup competition. The league partnered with online ticket company Ticketworld in selling the tickets, priced at P100 for the grandstand and P50 for the bleachers. UFL president Randy Roxas said that the league decided to start selling match tickets to give more value to the games. In addition, Roxas explained that the selling of tickets is also in compliance with the requirements of the Asian Football Confederation, which the UFL wants follow so that the league would be further recognized in the international scene.

The UFL introduced the UFL FA League Cup in its calendar so that the start of each season would be in September. The move aligns the league's schedule with those in the ASEAN Football Federation. The FA League Cup pushes both the cup and league competitions to January every year, which aligns to the schedules of leagues in the Southeast Asian region such as the Malaysia Super League, V.League 1, and the Indonesia Super League. Twenty clubs from both divisions participated in the 2014 FA League Cup.

To promote football awareness in the country, the UFL conducted mall tours around Metro Manila in June 2014 before the start of the 2014 FA League Cup. Several UFL players conducted football clinics in a number of shopping malls, which include the Sta. Lucia East Grand Mall in Cainta, Rizal, SM City Fairview in Quezon City, and Robinsons Place in Manila.

In September 2014, UFL general manager Rely San Agustin announced the plans of holding an all-star event to showcase the growing number of UFL stars within the 2015 season. In addition, San Agustin also hinted on the a possibility of staging the first provincial game in the Visayas region.

In the 2016 season, the UFL Division 2 was discontinued. The second division clubs joined the first division clubs to form a single twelve team division. Additionally, the FA Cup and the FA League Cup were discontinued. The PFF National Men's Club Championship was also discontinued, possibly to give way to the upcoming Philippines Football League (PFL) that is slated to begin in 2017.

In October 2016, it was reported that the 2016 season will be last UFL season following the appointment of UFL President Randy Roxas as part of the task force for the upcoming PFL to be launched in 2017.

== Past league champions ==
=== Results by year ===
Season	Champion	Runners-up	Third place
2010	Philippine Air Force	Kaya	Union
2011	Philippine Air Force	Global	Philippine Army
2012	Global	Kaya	Loyola Meralco Sparks
2013	Stallion	Global	Loyola Meralco Sparks
2014	Global	Loyola Meralco Sparks	Kaya
2015	Ceres	Global	Loyola Meralco Sparks
2016	Global	Ceres	Loyola Meralco Sparks

=== Titles by club ===
Rank	Club	Number of titles	Years of titles
1	**Global**	3	2012, 2014, 2016
2	Philippine Air Force	2	2010, 2011
3	**Stallion**	1	2013
3	**Ceres**	1	2015
Note: **Bold** indicates clubs currently playing in the league

== Clubs ==
Division 1

Since its inception, a total of 20 clubs have played in the UFL. The following 12 clubs will be competed in the 2016 season:

Includes clubs that participated in the 2016 edition which features a single division.

Club	Founded	UFL seasons
Agila	2011	2016
Ceres	2012	2015–2016
Forza	2010	2016
General Trias International^{c}		2014–2015
Global^{a, b}	2000	2011–2016
Green Archers United^{a, b}	1998	2010–2016
JP Voltes^{a}	2009	2016
Kaya^{a, b}	1996	2010–2016
Laos	2000	2016
Loyola Meralco Sparks^{a, b}	2006	2010–2016
Manila Jeepney	2013	2015
Manila Nomads^{a}	1914	2012–2013, 2016
Mendiola	1991	2010
Pachanga Diliman	1998	2013–2015
Pasargad	1996	2012–2014, 2016
Philippine Air Force		2010–13
Philippine Army	1960	2010–15
Philippine Navy		2010–12
Stallion	2001	2012–2016
Team Socceroo	2005	2014–2015
Union Internacional Manila	2001	2010

^{a}: Founding member of the United Football League
^{b}: Never relegated to UFL Division 2 ^{c}: Merged with Philippine Army in 2014

- Laos was promoted to the first division after clinching the UFL Division 2 league championship
- JP Voltes was supposed to be promoted to the first division after defeating Team Socceroo, 12–1, in a two-legged aggregate-goal playoff but the two divisions were merged into a single division for the 2016 season.
- Agila, Forza and Pasargad were originally from UFL Division 2. However, the division was discontinued and the clubs were placed with the first division clubs to form a single division.
- Philippine Army GTI, Manila Jeepney, and Pachanga Diliman voluntarily exited the league due to lack of funding.
- Manila Nomads returned to the UFL after leaving the UFL Division 2 just before the 2015 season
- Global and Stallion have remained in UFL Division 1 since their first promotion

Division 2

== Venues ==
The following were the primary venues used in the United Football League:

Manila	Taguig	Makati
Rizal Memorial Football Stadium	Emperador Stadium	University of Makati Stadium
Capacity: **12,873**	Capacity: **2,000**	Capacity: **4,000**

== Players ==
=== Eligibility of foreign players ===
Starting the 2014 season, the UFL executive committee decided to implement a version of the foreign player rule. Under such rule, a club was only allowed to field in a maximum of five foreign players on the pitch at any given time. However, two of the six remaining players on the pitch was allowed to be still be foreigners provided that they were permanent residents of the Philippines for at least five years. In the first year of the rule's implementation, Manila Nomads had to voluntarily step down from UFL Division 1 to the second division due to the inability to comply with the foreign player rule. For the 2016 edition the foreign player cap was reduced to four from five foreign players in a playing squad of 18 players, including 7 substitutes. At least one of the four maximum allowable foreign players must be from the Asian country. This was to align to the guidelines followed at the AFC Cup and AFC Champions League. However, a club with more than 25 players was allowed to have more than four foreign players in their whole squad provided that they complied with the 4-player foreign player limit rule during match day.

== Honors ==
=== Golden Ball award ===
The UFL Golden Ball Award was the league's equivalent for the Most Valuable Player award. The award was given starting the 2012 season after the league's expansion to two divisions. Spanish–Filipino footballer Carli de Murga of Global was awarded the inaugural Golden Ball for the first division. Freddy Gonzalez of Pachanga, on the other hand, won it the same year for the second division.

Year	Player	Position	Club
2012	(Philippines) Carli de Murga	Midfielder	Global
2013	(Spain) Rufo Sánchez	Forward	Stallion
2014	(Netherlands) Milan Arends	Midfielder	Stallion
2015	(Philippines) Manuel Ott	Midfielder	Ceres
2016	(Philippines) Hikaru Minegishi	Midfielder	Global

=== Golden Boot winners ===
The UFL Golden Boot was awarded to the footballer who has scored the most goals in a single season. Izzeldin El Habbib, while playing for Kaya FC, was given the league's first golden boot at the end of the 2010 season.

Season	Player	Club	Goals
2010	(Sudan) Izzeldin El Habbib	Kaya	14
2011	(Sudan) Izzeldin El Habbib	Global	10
2012	(Philippines) Phil Younghusband	Loyola Meralco Sparks	23
2013	(Spain) Rufo Sánchez	Stallion FC	18
2014	(Philippines) Mark Hartmann	Global	27
2015	(Spain) Adrián Gallardo	Ceres	18
2016	(Spain) Adrián Gallardo	Ceres	30

=== Best Midfielder award ===
Year	Player	Club
2016	(Philippines) Matthew Hartmann	Global

=== Best Defender award ===
Year	Player	Club
2016	(Japan) Masaki Yanagawa	JP Voltes

=== Golden Glove trophy ===
The UFL Golden Glove was an annual association football award presented to the best goalkeeper who has kept the most clean sheets in UFL Division 1. Roland Sadia of Global FC won the award twice consecutively in 2013 and 2014.

Year	Player	Club
2012	(Iran) Saba Garmaroudi	Kaya
2013	(Ivory Coast) Roland Sadia	Global
2014	(Ivory Coast) Roland Sadia	Global
2015	(Philippines) Tomas Trigo	Loyola Meralco Sparks
2016	(Philippines) Nelson Gasic	JP Voltes

For the list of UFL Division 2 honours, see here.

== Media coverage ==
The UFL had an exclusive broadcasting agreement with AksyonTV, which is owned and operated by ABC Development Corporation. Originally, the league signed a 5-year agreement with AKTV after the end of the 2011 season worth P150 million to air two live matches every week. However, on April 11, 2013, TV5 announced that its blocktime agreement with IBC will not be renewed, which means that AKTV would cease broadcasting on May 31 of the same year. Thus, broadcasts of the UFL were moved to AksyonTV where it was aired until the end of the 2016 season.

- Studio 23 (2011)
- AKTV (2011–13)
- AksyonTV (2013–2016)

== Official match ball ==
- 2012–2016: Molten VG-5000A

== See also ==
- ASEAN Super League
- Filipino Premier League
- PFF National Men's Club Championship
