= Dan Palami =

Filipino businessman and sports executive (born 1970)

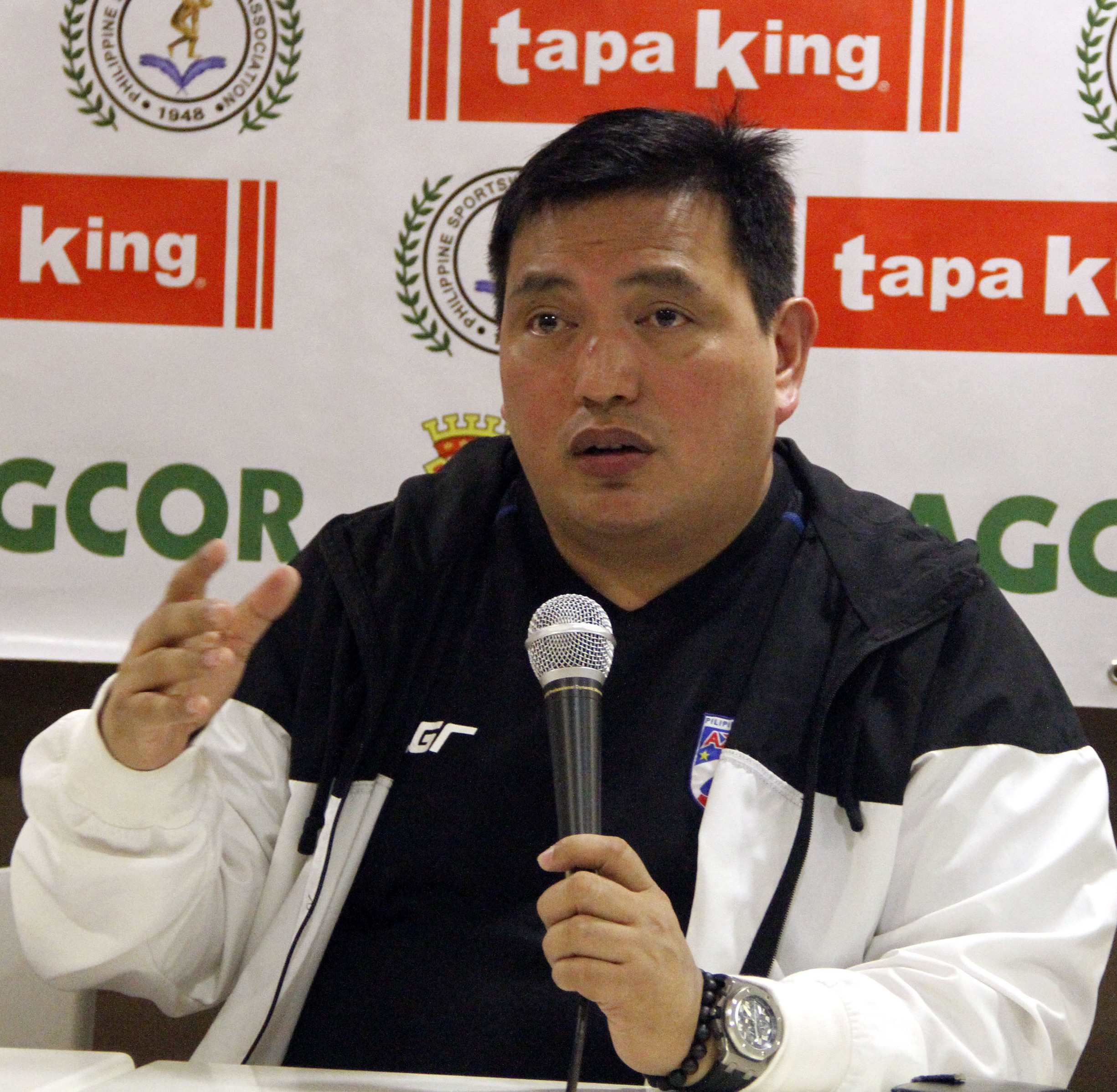
- Palami in 2018

Personal information
- Full name: Dan Stephen Castillo Palami
- Date of birth: June 9, 1970 (age 56)
- Place of birth: Tacloban, Philippines

Managerial career
- Years: Team
- 2009–2024: Philippines (general manager (Note: General manager role. The role of the head coach is separate position.))
Medal record
Men's football
Representing Philippines
AFC Challenge Cup
Runner-up	2014 Maldives
Third place	2012 Nepal

Dan Stephen Castillo Palami (born June 9, 1970) is a Filipino business and sports executive. He was the general manager of the Philippine men's national football team from 2009 to 2024. He is credited for his contributions to the revival of football in the Philippines due to the national team's performance at the 2010 AFF Championship.

== Early life and education ==
Dan Palami was born in Tacloban on June 9, 1970. He studied at the University of the Philippines and pursued a degree in accountancy. Palami became a certified public accountant. He also studied law at the same university but stopped his studies during his fourth year to establish a railway company.

== Business career ==
Palami is the CEO of Autre Porte Global Inc. (APT Global), a railway engineering company which is involved in various capacities in LRT-1 and LRT-2 in Metro Manila.

== Sports executive career ==
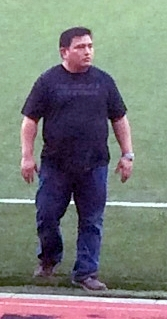
Palami in 2016

=== Football ===
Laos and Global

After he established APT Global, Palami and members of his staff played football recreationally at the back of the Quezon City Hall and later at the Sunken Garden at the University of the Philippines. This would lead to the founding of Laos F.C. which later had some success at local tournaments such as the Ang Liga.

Palami owned Global F.C. from the club's inception until December 2017, when the club was sold to Alvin Caranzza of MacGraphics Carranz.

Philippines U19

In November 2009, Palami was offered to handle the Philippine U19 national football team. Palami accepted the offer to manage the team through the 2010 AFC U-19 Championship qualification. He quit after a poor finish at the tournament only gaining a point against Guam.

Philippines national senior team

The Philippine Football Federation hired Dan Palami to be the manager of the Philippine national football team in December 2009. The Philippine Football Federation allowed Palami autonomy over the national football team. Palami was hesitant in accepting the job at first but accepted the offer of the PFF after learning that the next major tournament, the 2010 AFF Championship, was months away, since he had more little time to prepare the U-19 team at the AFC U-19 Championship qualifiers. Palami is in charge of recruiting players and hiring the coach of the team. During the earlier phase of his management he had to fund the team from his own personal funds as the team had difficulties gaining financial support from corporate sponsors. The team's kit sponsor at that time was Mizuno.

In March 2018, Palami secured qualification for the Philippines in the 2019 AFC Asian Cup when the national team won, 2–1, over Tajikistan.

He announced that he would be leaving his role with the national team on January 9, 2024. He was succeeded by former national team player Freddy Gonzalez.

Philippines national youth teams

In late 2017, it was reported that Palami would be involved in managing the Philippine youth teams in 2018. Palami described the setup of the national youth team to the setup of the senior national team in 2010 when there was a lack of developmental plan and transparency on the selection of players. He notes that national youth players are selected from the same schools which their coaches are affiliated with which he says is "coincidence at best and justifiable" but concedes that it creates doubts due to a lack of transparency on the selection process. Palami is reportedly planning to choose regularly competing players from three pools in Luzon, Visayas, and Mindanao for the final line-up of the youth teams.

After helping the senior team qualify for their very first Asian Cup, Palami in March 2018 stated that he is considering another role in Philippine football. He said he might get involved in the grassroots of football in the country.

=== Basketball ===
In 2014, he was appointed as the team manager of the UP Fighting Maroons men's basketball team of the University Athletic Association of the Philippines (UAAP).

== Political career ==
In 2007, Palami ran for city mayor of Tacloban against Alfred Romualdez, son of outgoing mayor Alfredo 'Bejo' Romualdez. He lost the election by a more than 22,000 vote margin.
