= 2017 in Malaysian football =

Football in Malaysia
- Season: 2017

Men's football
- Super League: Johor Darul Ta'zim
- Premier League: Kuala Lumpur
- FAM League: Sime Darby
- FA Cup: Kedah
- Malaysia Cup: Johor Darul Ta'zim
- Community Shield: Kedah

The 2017 season of competitive association football in Malaysia.

== Promotion and relegation ==
=== Pre-season ===
League	Promoted to league	Relegated from league
Liga Super	Melaka United; PKNS	PDRM; Terengganu
Liga Premier	MISC-MIFA; PKNP	Sime Darby

== New and withdrawn teams ==
=== New teams ===
- (Kuala Lumpur) DBKL (FAM League)
- (Sarawak) Kuching (FAM League)
- Terengganu City F.C. (FAM League)

=== Withdrawn teams ===
- (Kuala Lumpur) DRB-HICOM (Premier League)
- (Sabah) DYS (FAM League)
- (Selangor) Megah Murni (FAM League)
- (Perak) Ipoh (FAM League)
- (Penang) Sungai Ara (FAM League)

== National team ==
Win Draw Lose

=== Malaysia national football team ===
==== 2019 AFC Asian Cup qualification – third round ====
Pos	Team	Pld	W	D	L	GF	GA	GD	Pts	Qualification	Lebanon	North Korea	Hong Kong	Malaysia
1	Lebanon	6	5	1	0	14	4	+10	16	2019 AFC Asian Cup	—	5–0	2–0	2–1
2	North Korea	6	3	2	1	13	10	+3	11	2019 AFC Asian Cup	2–2	—	2–0	4–1
3	Hong Kong	6	1	2	3	4	7	−3	5		0–1	1–1	—	2–0
4	Malaysia	6	0	1	5	5	15	−10	1		1–2	1–4	1–1	—

Source: AFC
Rules for classification: Qualification tiebreakers

13 June 2017	Malaysia	1–2	Lebanon	Tan Sri Dato' Haji Hassan Yunos Stadium, Johor Bahru
21:45 UTC+8	Mahali 43'	Report	Ataya 79', 90+4'	Attendance: 6,850; Referee: Jameel Abdulhusin (Bahrain)

5 September 2017	Malaysia	1–1	Hong Kong	Hang Jebat Stadium, Malacca City
20:45 UTC+8	Zainon 56'	Report	Sandro 53'	Attendance: 3,646; Referee: Chris Beath (Australia)

10 October 2017	Hong Kong	2–0	Malaysia	Hong Kong Stadium, Hong Kong
20:00 UTC+8	Jordi 44'; McKee 49'	Report		Attendance: 7,920; Referee: Nivon Robesh Gamini (Sri Lanka)

10 November 2017 (Note: Due to the death of Kim Jong-nam that led to a diplomatic crisis between Malaysia and North Korea, the Malaysian government decided to disallow the Malaysian football team from playing in North Korea for safety reasons. On 10 March 2017, the Asian Football Confederation (AFC) announced that North Korea's home match against Malaysia, originally scheduled for 28 March at the Kim Il-sung Stadium in Pyongyang, would be postponed, with the AFC announcing on 15 March 2017 that the match would be played on 8 June. On 17 May 2017, the AFC announced that the match was postponed for a second time, to 5 October, due to "geo-political tension on the Korean Peninsula". On 28 September 2017, the AFC announced that the match was again postponed after the Malaysian government announced a travel ban on Malaysian nationals visiting North Korea. On 20 October 2017, the AFC announced that both matches between North Korea and Malaysia would be played at a neutral venue in the interests of competition fairness, with North Korea's "home" match played on 10 November 2017 and Malaysia's "home" match played on 13 November 2017.)	North Korea	4–1	Malaysia	Buriram Stadium, Buriram (Thailand) (Note: On 15 March 2017, the AFC announced that should diplomatic relations between the two countries not return to normal, the match between North Korea and Malaysia would be played at a neutral venue, and Malaysia's home match against North Korea would also be moved to a neutral venue to preserve sporting values and the spirit of fair play. After the AFC received confirmation that Malaysians were allowed to travel to North Korea, the AFC agreed that the match would be played in Pyongyang. However, at the announcement of the second postponement, the AFC said the venue would be decided after monitoring the safety and security of the AFC Cup and AFC U-23 Championship qualifying matches taking place in North Korea in the coming months. On 20 October 2017, the AFC announced that both matches between North Korea and Malaysia would be played at a neutral venue in the interests of competition fairness, with North Korea's "home" match played on 10 November 2017 and Malaysia's "home" match played on 13 November 2017, which were later confirmed to be played at Thailand.)
20:00 UTC+7	Pak Kwang-ryong 12' (pen.); Kim Yu-song 42'; Kim Yong-il 48'; Jong Il-gwan 59'	Report	Safawi 67'	Attendance: 287; Referee: Fahad Al-Mirdasi (Saudi Arabia)

13 November 2017	Malaysia	1–4	North Korea	Buriram Stadium, Buriram (Thailand)
19:00 UTC+7	Safawi 85'	Report	Kim Yu-song 15', 20', 44'; Pak Kwang-ryong 79'	Attendance: 504; Referee: Ahmed Al-Kaf (Oman)

==== International Friendlies ====
22 March 2017 Friendly	Philippines	0–0	Malaysia	Manila, Philippines
19:30 UTC+8				Stadium: Rizal Memorial Stadium

22 August 2017 Friendly	Malaysia	1–2	Syria	Malacca, Malaysia
20:45 UTC+8	Darren 90+4' (pen.)		Marmour 83'; Muhtadi 85'	Stadium: Hang Jebat Stadium

29 August 2017 Friendly	Myanmar	1–0	Malaysia	Yangon, Myanmar
17:30 UTC+06:30	Kyaw Ko Ko 89'			Stadium: Thuwunna Stadium

=== Malaysia national under-22 football team ===
==== 2018 AFC U-23 Championship qualification ====
Pos	Team	Pld	W	D	L	GF	GA	GD	Pts	Qualification
1	Malaysia	3	2	0	1	5	3	+2	6	Final tournament
2	Thailand (H)	3	1	2	0	4	1	+3	5	Final tournament
3	Indonesia	3	1	1	1	7	3	+4	4	
4	Mongolia	3	0	1	2	1	10	−9	1	

Source: AFC
Rules for classification: Qualification tiebreakers
(H) Hosts

19 July	Indonesia	0–3	Malaysia	Bangkok, Thailand
16:00 UTC+7		Report	Syafiq 4'; Jafri 20'; Thanabalan 30'	Stadium: National Stadium, Bangkok; Attendance: 360; Referee: Jarred Gillett (Australia)

21 July	Malaysia	0–3	Thailand	Bangkok, Thailand
19:00 UTC+7		Report	Chenrop 25', 45+3'; Picha 87'	Stadium: National Stadium, Bangkok; Attendance: 3,019; Referee: Hasan Akrami (Iran)

23 July	Malaysia	2–0	Mongolia	Bangkok, Thailand
16:00 UTC+7	Thanabalan 51'; Andik 86'	Report		Stadium: National Stadium, Bangkok; Attendance: 669; Referee: Jarred Gillett (Australia)

==== 2017 Southeast Asian Games ====
Pos	Team	Pld	W	D	L	GF	GA	GD	Pts	Qualification
1	Malaysia (H)	4	4	0	0	10	4	+6	12	Semi-finals
2	Myanmar	4	3	0	1	12	4	+8	9	Semi-finals
3	Singapore	4	2	0	2	4	4	0	6	
4	Laos	4	1	0	3	5	8	−3	3	
5	Brunei	4	0	0	4	1	12	−11	0	

Updated to match(es) played on 23 August 2017. Source: KL2017 Official Website
Rules for classification: 1) Points; 2) Goal difference; 3) Goals scored
(H) Hosts

14 August Group stage	Malaysia	2–1	Brunei	Shah Alam, Malaysia
20:45 UTC+8	Safawi 4'; Adam 60'	Report	Zulkhairy 12'	Stadium: Shah Alam Stadium, Shah Alam; Referee: Tejas Nagvenkar (India)

16 August Group stage	Singapore	1–2	Malaysia	Shah Alam, Malaysia
20:45 UTC+8	Amiruldin 38'	Report	Azam 68'; Thanabalan 74'	Stadium: Shah Alam Stadium, Shah Alam; Referee: Võ Minh Trí (Vietnam)

21 August Group stage	Malaysia	3–1	Myanmar	Shah Alam, Malaysia
20:45 UTC+8	Thanabalan 33', 82'; Safawi 35'	Report	Than Paing 85'	Stadium: Shah Alam Stadium, Shah Alam; Referee: Tejas Nagvenkar (India)

23 August Group stage	Laos	1–3	Malaysia	Shah Alam, Malaysia
20:45 UTC+8	Phanthavong 32'	Report	Jafri 26', 90+2'; Adib 39'	Stadium: Shah Alam Stadium, Shah Alam; Referee: Chen Hsin-chuan (Chinese Taipei)

26 August Semi-finals	Indonesia	0–1	Malaysia	Shah Alam, Malaysia
20:45 UTC+8		Report	Thanabalan 86'	Stadium: Shah Alam Stadium, Shah Alam; Referee: Lakmal Weerakkody (Sri Lanka)

29 August Final	Malaysia	0–1	Thailand	Shah Alam, Malaysia
20:45 UTC+8			Haziq 39' (o.g.)	Stadium: Shah Alam Stadium; Referee: Chen Hsin-chuan (Chinese Taipei)

==== Dubai Cup ====
20 March	Malaysia	1–1	China	Dubai, United Arab Emirates
20:00 UTC+8	Thanabalan 90'	Report	Yao Jun Sheng 69' (pen.)	Stadium: Police Officers Club Stadium; Referee: Yehya Al Mula (UAE)

23 March	Thailand	4–0	Malaysia	Dubai, United Arab Emirates
20:00 UTC+8	Sittichok 31' (pen.); Sasalak 59'; Phitiwat 65'; Thanasit Siriphala 90'			Stadium: Theab Awana; Referee: Saker Al Zaabi (UAE)

26 March	Malaysia	3–1	Singapore	Dubai, United Arab Emirates
20:00 UTC+8	Adam 13'; Kumaahran 15'; Thanabalan 65'		Adam 39'	Stadium: Theab Awana; Referee: Abdullah Naji (UAE)

28 March	Jordan	4–0	Malaysia	Dubai, United Arab Emirates
23:30 UTC+8	Khalid Waleed 2'; Ahmed Al-Reyahi 35'; Bilal Ali 75'; Wesam Abu Daabes 81'			Stadium: Police Officers Club Stadium; Referee: Hamad Ali Yousef (UAE)

==== International Friendlies ====
10 June	China	1–0	Malaysia	Xiangtan, China
19:00 UTC+8	Xiang Bai Xu 1'			Stadium: Xiangtan Sports Centre

13 June	Malaysia	2–2	(China) Guangzhou R&F	Guangzhou, China
17:00 UTC+8	Safawi 47', 53'		Deng Zhiyao 21'; Zhu Di 38'	Stadium: Baining Football Training

15 June	Malaysia	3–0	(China) Guangzhou Evergrande (RT)	Guangzhou, China
17:00 UTC+8	Jafri 33'; Syafiq 77'; Thanabalan 89'			Stadium: Baining Football Training

22 June	Malaysia	1–5	(Malaysia) Melaka United	Melaka, Malaysia
22:00 UTC+8	Safawi 3'		R. Surendran 40'; Marko 46', 49', 64', 66'	Stadium: Hang Jebat Stadium

13 July	Malaysia	2–0	Myanmar	Shah Alam, Malaysia
16:00 UTC+8	Thanabalan 26'; Danial 87'			Stadium: Shah Alam Stadium

=== Malaysia national under-19 football team ===
==== 2018 AFC U-19 Championship qualification ====
Pos	Team	Pld	W	D	L	GF	GA	GD	Pts	Qualification
1	South Korea (H)	4	4	0	0	22	0	+22	12	Final tournament
2	Malaysia	4	3	0	1	8	5	+3	9	Final tournament
3	Indonesia (Note: Indonesia, as final tournament hosts, automatically qualified regardless of qualification results.)	4	2	0	2	11	8	+3	6	Final tournament
4	Timor-Leste	4	0	1	3	3	14	−11	1	
5	Brunei	4	0	1	3	2	19	−17	1	

Source: AFC
Rules for classification: Qualification tiebreakers
(H) Hosts
Notes:

31 October 2017	Timor-Leste	1–3	Malaysia	Paju, South Korea
11:00 (UTC+8)	Da Costa 90+2' (pen.)	Report	Hadi Fayyadh 53'; Akif Syahiran 68'; Zhafir Yusof 77'	Stadium: Paju Public Stadium; Attendance: 44; Referee: Zhang Lei (China)

4 November 2017	Malaysia	1–0	Brunei	Paju, South Korea
11:00 (UTC+8)	Zafuan Azeman 76'	Report		Stadium: Paju Public Stadium; Attendance: 764; Referee: Nivon Robesh Gamini (Sri Lanka)

6 November 2017	Malaysia	4–1	Indonesia	Paju, South Korea
11:00 (UTC+8)	Hadi Fayyadh 7' (pen.), 52' (pen.); Akhyar Rashid 34'; Shivan Pillay 47'	Report	Hanis 42'	Stadium: Paju Public Stadium; Attendance: 101; Referee: Mooud Bonyadifar (Iran)

8 November 2017	South Korea	3–0	Malaysia	Paju, South Korea
14:00 (UTC+8)	Um Won-sang 11'; Kim Jung-min 38'; Cho Young-wook 45+2' (pen.)	Report		Stadium: Paju Public Stadium; Attendance: 674; Referee: Mooud Bonyadifar (Iran)

==== 2017 AFF U-18 Youth Championship ====
Pos	Team	Pld	W	D	L	GF	GA	GD	Pts	Qualification
1	Malaysia	5	4	1	0	13	3	+10	13	Knockout stage
2	Thailand	5	4	1	0	9	2	+7	13	Knockout stage
3	Timor-Leste	5	2	1	2	7	10	−3	7	
4	Singapore	5	2	0	3	10	11	−1	6	
5	Cambodia	5	1	1	3	8	10	−2	4	
6	Laos	5	0	0	5	5	16	−11	0	

Source: AFF

4 September 2017 Group stage	Malaysia	4–1	Laos	Yangon, Myanmar
16:30 (UTC+8)	Hadi Fayyadh 28', 90+1'; Akhyar Rashid 45', 60'	Report	Bounphacham Bounkong 48'	Stadium: Aung San Stadium; Attendance: 100; Referee: Hoang Ngoc Ha (Vietnam)

6 September 2017 Group stage	Malaysia	3–1	Singapore	Yangon, Myanmar
16:30 (UTC+8)	Zafuan Azeman 58'; Ammar Alias 68'; Hadi Fayyadh 90' (pen.)	Report	Katz Ellison 90+1'	Stadium: Aung San Stadium; Attendance: 109; Referee: Clifford Daypuyat (Philippines)

8 September 2017 Group stage	Timor-Leste	0–3	Malaysia	Yangon, Myanmar
19:30 (UTC+8)		Report	Akhyar Rashid 8'; Nurfais Johari 56'; Saiful Iskandar 90'	Stadium: Aung San Stadium; Attendance: 90; Referee: Khaing Zaw (Myanmar)

10 September 2017 Group stage	Cambodia	0–2	Malaysia	Yangon, Myanmar
16:30 (UTC+8)		Report	Shafizi Iqmal 22'; Syafiq Danial 54'	Stadium: Thuwunna Stadium; Attendance: 100; Referee: Soe Lin Aung (Myanmar)

12 September 2017 Group stage	Thailand	1–1	Malaysia	Yangon, Myanmar
16:30 (UTC+8)	Kritsada Kaman 63'	Report	Akif Syahiran 50'	Stadium: Thuwunna Stadium; Attendance: 70; Referee: Thant Zin Oo (Myanmar)

15 September 2017 Semi-finals	Malaysia	0–0 (5–4 p)	Myanmar	Yangon, Myanmar
19:30 (UTC+8)				Stadium: Thuwunna Stadium; Referee: Hoàng Ngọc Hà (Vietnam)
	Penalties
	Hadi Fayyadh (penalty scored); Zafuan Azeman (penalty scored); Izzuddin Roslan (penalty scored); Nurfais Johari (penalty scored); Ammar Akhmal (penalty missed); Syaiful Alias (penalty scored)		(penalty scored) Pyae Sone Naing; (penalty missed) Than Htike Zin; (penalty scored) Myat Kaung Khant; (penalty scored) Naing Ko Ko; (penalty scored) Soe Moe Kyaw; (penalty missed) Aung Wunna Soe

17 September 2017 Final	Thailand	2–0	Malaysia	Yangon, Myanmar
19:30 (UTC+8)	Eakkanit Punya 48'; Kritsada Kaman 51'			Stadium: Thuwunna Stadium; Referee: Clifford Daypuyat (Philippines)

=== Malaysia national under-16 football team ===
==== 2018 AFC U-16 Championship qualification ====
Pos	Team	Pld	W	D	L	GF	GA	GD	Pts	Qualification
1	Japan	3	3	0	0	35	0	+35	9	Final tournament
2	Malaysia (Note: Malaysia, as final tournament hosts, automatically qualified regardless of qualification results.)	3	2	0	1	20	6	+14	6	Final tournament
3	Singapore	3	1	0	2	10	18	−8	3	
4	Guam	3	0	0	3	2	43	−41	0	

Source: AFC
Rules for classification: Qualification tiebreakers
Notes:

20 September 2017	Malaysia	6–1	Singapore	Wibawa Mukti Stadium, Bekasi
19:00	Shamsudin 5', 17'; Adam 11'; Ruzki 29'; Khalili 55'; Kaironnisam 68'	Report	Tan 23'	Attendance: 280; Referee: Saoud Al-Athbah (Qatar)

22 September 2017	Guam	1–14	Malaysia	Wibawa Mukti Stadium, Bekasi
16:00	Halehale 84'	Report	Hafizo 11'; Azman 15' (pen.), 49', 87'; Za’ba 23'; Khairi 30' (pen.); Mutalib 45+1', 51'; Jaineh 48'; Ishak 59', 81'; Amali 67', 77'; Redzuan 72'	Attendance: 120; Referee: Chen Hsin-chuan (Chinese Taipei)

24 September 2017	Japan	4–0	Malaysia	Wibawa Mukti Stadium, Bekasi
16:00	Yoshida 23'; Ueda 27'; K. Nakano 49'; Aoki 73'	Report		Attendance: 150; Referee: Mahmood Salim Said Al-Majarafi (Oman)

==== 2017 AFF U-15 Championship ====
Pos	Team	Pld	W	D	L	GF	GA	GD	Pts	Qualification
1	Vietnam	5	5	0	0	16	2	+14	15	Knockout stage
2	Malaysia	5	4	0	1	11	3	+8	12	Knockout stage
3	Cambodia	5	2	0	3	8	8	0	6	
4	Brunei	5	1	2	2	3	5	−2	5	
5	Philippines	5	1	1	3	2	13	−11	4	
6	Timor-Leste	5	0	1	4	0	9	−9	1	

Source: aseanfootball.org
Rules for classification: Tiebreakers

10 July 2017 Group stage	Malaysia	2–0	Philippines	Chonburi Campus Stadium 2, Chonburi
16:00	Khalili 31'; Hafizo 58'	Report		Attendance: 100; Referee: Chan Nathan Rong De (Singapore)

12 July 2017 Group stage	Timor-Leste	0–2	Malaysia	Chonburi Campus Stadium 1, Chonburi
16:00		Report	Danish 31'; Harith 64'	Attendance: 50; Referee: Oki Dwi Putra Senjaya (Indonesia)

14 July 2017 Group stage	Brunei	0–3	Malaysia	Chonburi Campus Stadium 1, Chonburi
16:00		Report	Azrul 4'; Azzim 37'; Ashrafiq 48'	Attendance: 50; Referee: Warintorn Sassadee (Thailand)

16 July 2017 Group stage	Malaysia	0–1	Vietnam	Chonburi Campus Stadium 2, Chonburi
16:00	Jaineh (yellow card) 71' (yellow-red card) 80'	Report	Thuận 3'	Attendance: 50; Referee: Pummarin Khamruen (Thailand)

18 July 2017 Group stage	Cambodia	2–4	Malaysia	Chonburi Campus Stadium 1, Chonburi
18:30	Bunnarong 47', 70'	Report	Azzim 22'; Danial 30'; Ashrafiq 73', 82'	Attendance: 100; Referee: Hoang Ngoc Ha (Vietnam)

20 July 2017 Semi-finals	Thailand	1–0	Malaysia	Chonburi Stadium, Chonburi
16:00	Jakkrapong 17'	Report		Attendance: 250; Referee: Chan Nathan Rong De (Singapore)

22 July 2017 Third place	Malaysia	2–3	Australia	Chonburi Stadium, Chonburi
16:00	Azzim 7'; Danial 80'	Report	Kucharski 16'; Antonis 38'; Kirdar 76'	Attendance: 250; Referee: Warintorn Sassadee (Thailand)

== League season ==
=== Super League ===
Pos	Team	Pld	W	D	L	GF	GA	GD	Pts	Qualification or relegation
1	Johor Darul Ta'zim (C)	22	15	4	3	50	19	+31	49	Qualification to Champions League preliminary round 2 or AFC Cup group stage
2	Pahang (Note: Pahang withdraw from AFC competition.)	22	12	4	6	44	26	+18	40	
3	Felda United (Note: Felda United were relegated because they failed to renew their licence) (R)	22	11	6	5	40	26	+14	39	Relegation to Premier League
4	Kedah (Note: Kedah as 2017 Malaysia FA Cup winners not eligible for AFC competition spots as they failed granted AFC club license.)	22	9	8	5	45	33	+12	35	
5	Perak	22	9	7	6	30	31	−1	34	
6	Selangor	22	9	6	7	32	28	+4	33	
7	PKNS	22	6	7	9	33	38	−5	25	
8	Melaka United	22	6	6	10	33	46	−13	24	
9	T–Team (R)	22	7	5	10	30	45	−15	23 (Note: Kelantan and T–Team was sentenced to a six-point deduction immediately on offense failed to complete the registration process Malaysian League (M-League) 2017. Later, upon careful consideration of the aforementioned appeals, Football Malaysia have decided to lift the transfer ban and reduce the deduction of 6 points to 3 points for T-Team.)	Relegation to Premier League
10	Kelantan	22	7	4	11	31	39	−8	22 (Note: Kelantan and T–Team was sentenced to a six-point deduction immediately on offense failed to complete the registration process Malaysian League (M-League) 2017. Later, upon careful consideration of the aforementioned appeals, Football Malaysia have decided to only reduce the deduction of 6 points to 3 points for Kelantan.)	
11	Sarawak (R)	22	5	6	11	24	34	−10	21	Relegation to Premier League
12	Penang (R)	22	3	3	16	16	43	−27	12	Relegation to Premier League

Source: FAM, FMLLP
Rules for classification: 1) Points; 2) Goal difference; 3) Number of goals scored.
(C) Champions; (R) Relegated

=== Premier League ===
Pos	Team	Pld	W	D	L	GF	GA	GD	Pts	Promotion, qualification or relegation
1	Kuala Lumpur	22	15	2	5	47	24	+23	47	Promotion to Super League
2	Terengganu	22	15	2	5	42	27	+15	47	Promotion to Super League
3	PKNP	22	14	4	4	41	23	+18	46	Promotion to Super League
4	Johor Darul Ta'zim II	22	11	8	3	47	27	+20	41	
5	Negeri Sembilan	22	11	8	3	37	24	+13	41	Promotion to Super League
6	UiTM	22	9	6	7	44	30	+14	33	
7	Sabah	22	9	3	10	33	38	−5	30	
8	PDRM	22	7	4	11	36	41	−5	25	
9	Kuantan	22	5	1	16	41	64	−23	16	
10	MISC-MIFA	22	4	2	16	36	51	−15	14	
11	ATM	22	4	5	13	28	50	−22	14 (Note: ATM and Perlis was sentenced to a six-point deduction immediately on offense failed to complete the registration process Malaysian League (M-League) 2017. Later, upon careful consideration of the aforementioned appeals, Football Malaysia have decided to only reduce the deduction of 6 points to 3 points for ATM.)	Relegation to FAM League
12	Perlis	22	4	3	15	22	55	−33	12 (Note: ATM and Perlis was sentenced to a six-point deduction immediately on offense failed to complete the registration process Malaysian League (M-League) 2017. Later, upon careful consideration of the aforementioned appeals, Football Malaysia have decided to lift the transfer ban and reduce the deduction of 6 points to 3 points for Perlis.)	Relegation to FAM League

Source: FAM, FMLLP
Rules for classification: 1) Points; 2) Goal difference; 3) Number of goals scored.

=== FAM League ===
==== Group A ====
Pos	Team	Pld	W	D	L	GF	GA	GD	Pts	Promotion or qualification
1	UKM	14	8	4	2	24	11	+13	28	Advance to knock-out stage
2	FELCRA	14	7	4	3	26	12	+14	25	Advance to knock-out stage
3	Shahzan Muda	14	7	4	3	17	11	+6	25	Advance to knock-out stage
4	MOF	14	7	2	5	22	18	+4	23	Advance to knock-out stage
5	MPKB-BRI U-Bes	14	5	6	3	21	16	+5	21	
6	Hanelang	14	3	3	8	11	28	−17	12	
7	DBKL	14	2	4	8	9	20	−11	10	
8	KDMM	14	2	3	9	13	27	−14	9	

Updated to match(es) played on 5 August 2017. Source:
Rules for classification: 1) Points; 2) Goal difference; 3) Number of goals scored

==== Group B ====
Pos	Team	Pld	W	D	L	GF	GA	GD	Pts	Promotion or qualification
1	Sime Darby	12	7	2	3	21	6	+15	23	Advance to knock-out stage
2	PJ Rangers	12	6	5	1	14	8	+6	23	Advance to knock-out stage
3	Terengganu City	12	6	3	3	13	12	+1	21	Advance to knock-out stage
4	Kuching	12	5	3	4	15	14	+1	18	Advance to knock-out stage
5	SAMB	12	4	5	3	13	13	0	17	
6	PBMS	12	2	2	8	11	19	−8	8	
7	Penjara	12	1	2	9	7	22	−15	5	

Updated to match(es) played on 29 July 2017. Source:
Rules for classification: 1) Points; 2) Goal difference; 3) Number of goals scored

==== Final ====
===== First leg =====
15 October 2017
20:45 UTC+8

UKM	0–1	Sime Darby
		Zul Fahmi Awang 53'

Tuanku Abdul Rahman Stadium, Paroi

===== Second leg =====
22 October 2017
20:45 UTC+8

Sime Darby	2–2	UKM
Nazrul Kamaruzaman 29'; Tunku Noor Hidayat 55'		Hasrul Nurkholis 17'; Faidzol Fazreen 89'

Petaling Jaya Stadium, Petaling Jaya

Sime Darby won 3–2 on aggregate.

== Domestic Cups ==
=== Charity Shield ===
20 January 2017
21:00 PDT

Johor Darul Ta'zim	1–1	Kedah
Safiq Rahim 41' (pen.)	Report	Badrol Bakhtiar 63'
Penalties
Jerónimo Barrales (penalty scored); Marcos António (penalty scored); Gonzalo Cabrera (penalty scored); Brian Ferreira (penalty missed); Safiq Rahim (penalty scored)	4–5	(penalty scored) Farhan Roslan; (penalty scored) Akram Mahinan; (penalty scored) Ken Ilsø; (penalty scored) Baddrol Bakhtiar; (penalty scored) Liridon Krasniqi

Larkin Stadium, Johor Bahru, Johor
Attendance: 24,157
Referee: Suhaimi Mat Hassan

=== FA Cup ===
==== Final ====
20 May 2017
21:00 UTC+8

Pahang	2–3	Kedah
Heo Jae-won 45+3'; Sumareh 80'	Report	20' Ken Ilsø; 45+1', 72' Baddrol

Shah Alam Stadium
Attendance: 78,898
Referee: Nagor Amir Noor Mohamed

=== Malaysia Cup ===
==== Final ====
4 November 2017
21:20 UTC+8

Kedah	0–2	Johor Darul Ta'zim
	Report	Aidil 3'; Cabrera 63'

Shah Alam Stadium, Shah Alam
Referee: Razlan Jeffri Ali

== Malaysian clubs in Asia ==
=== Johor Darul Ta'zim ===
==== AFC Champions League ====
===== Qualifying play-off =====
31 January 2017 Preliminary round 2	Bangkok United (Thailand)	1–1 (a.e.t.) (4–5 p)	(Malaysia) Johor Darul Ta'zim	Pathum Thani, Thailand
19:00 UTC+7	Ernesto Amantegui (substituted off) 74'; Jaycee John Okwunwanne (substituted in) 74' (yellow card) 78' (goal) 120+1'; Mika Chunuonsee (yellow card) 94'; Pokklaw Anan (substituted off) 104'; Sumanya Purisai (substituted in) 104'; Putthinan Wannasri (substituted off) 110'; Teeratep Winothai (substituted in) 110'	(HT 0–0)	Fadhli Shas (yellow card) 39'; Brian Ferreira (substituted off) 61'; Ahmad Hazwan Bakri (substituted in) 61'; Safawi Rasid (substituted off) 78'; Nazmi Faiz (substituted in) 78'; Farizal Marlias (yellow card) 82'; Gonzalo Cabrera (substituted off) 103'; Jeronimo Barrales (substituted in) 103' (red card) 112'; Safiq Rahim 108'; S. Kunanlan (yellow card) 110'	Stadium: Thammasat Stadium; Attendance: 4,502; Referee: Wang Di (China)
	Penalties
	Winothai (penalty scored); Bošković (penalty missed); Gjurovski (penalty scored); Macena (penalty scored); Okwunwanne (penalty scored); Ampaipitakwong (penalty missed)		Safiq (penalty scored); António (penalty missed); Fadhli (penalty scored); Amirul (penalty scored); Hazwan (penalty scored); Nazmi (penalty scored)

7 February 2017 Play-off round	Gamba Osaka (Japan)	3–0	(Malaysia) Johor Darul Ta'zim	Suita, Japan
19:00 UTC+9	Ademilson Junior 26' (substituted off) 88'; Shun Nagasawa 29'; Genta Miura 70'; Yasuhito Endō (yellow card) 75' (substituted off) 81'; Jin Izumisawa (substituted in) 81'; Ritsu Doan (substituted in) 88'	(HT 2–0)	Fazly Mazlan (yellow card) 21'; Azamuddin Akil (substituted off) 55'; Mahali Jasuli (substituted in) 55'; Safawi Rasid (yellow card) 65' (substituted off) 66'; Nazmi Faiz (substituted in) 66'; Brian Ferreira (yellow card) 75'	Stadium: Suita City Football Stadium; Attendance: 8,149; Referee: Turki Mohammed A Alkhudhayr (Saudi Arabia)

==== AFC Cup ====
===== Group stage =====
Pos	Team	Pld	W	D	L	GF	GA	GD	Pts	Qualification	GLO	JDT	BKA	MAG
1	(Philippines) Global Cebu	6	5	0	1	13	9	+4	15	Zonal semi-finals	—	3–2	3–1	1−0
2	(Malaysia) Johor Darul Ta'zim	6	4	1	1	16	5	+11	13	Zonal semi-finals	4–0	—	3–0	3–1
3	(Cambodia) Boeung Ket Angkor	6	1	1	4	3	12	−9	4		0–2	0–3	—	1–0
4	(Myanmar) Magwe	6	0	2	4	5	11	−6	2		2–4	1–1	1–1	—

Source: AFC
Rules for classification: Group stage tiebreakers

===== Zonal Semi-finals =====
17 May 2017 ASEAN Semi Final 1st leg	Johor Darul Ta'zim (Malaysia)	3–2	(Philippines) Ceres-Negros	Johor Bahru, Malaysia
20:45 UTC+8	Dominic Tan (yellow card) 8' (substituted off) 56'; Gonzalo Cabrera 18'; S. Kunanlan (yellow card) 35' (substituted off) 69'; Safiq Rahim 44'; Mohd Azrif Nasrulhaq (yellow card) 45+1'; Mohd Amirul Hadi Zainal (substituted in) 56'; Ahmad Hazwan Bakri 67'; Safawi Rasid (substituted in) 69'; Mohd Afiq Fazail (substituted off) 81'; Mohd Shakir Shaari (substituted in) 81'; Farizal Marlias (yellow card) 87'	(HT 2-2)	Fernando Rodríguez 21'; Bienvenido Marañón 24'; OJ Porteria (substituted off) 67'; Jason De Jong (substituted in) 67' (yellow card) 73'; Kota Kawase (substituted off) 80'; Luke Woodland (substituted in) 80'	Stadium: Tan Sri Dato Haji Hassan Yunos Stadium; Attendance: 14,220; Referee: Rowan Arumughan (India); Man of the Match: Ahmad Hazwan Bakri (Malaysia)

31 May 2017 ASEAN Semi Final 2nd leg	Ceres-Negros (Philippines)	2–1	(Malaysia) Johor Darul Ta'zim	Bacolod, Philippines
15:30 UTC+6:30	Kota Kawase 26'; Bienvenido Maranon (substituted off) 75'; Carlos Martinez (substituted in) 75'; Fernando Rodríguez 94'	(HT 1-0)	Mahali Jasuli (substituted off) 45'; Ahmad Hazwan Bakri (substituted in) 45'; Mohd Afiq Fazail (substituted off) 62'; Safawi Rasid (substituted in) 62'; Gabriel Guerra 65'; Gonzalo Cabrera (substituted off) 82'; Mohd Shakir Shaari (substituted in) 82'	Stadium: Panaad Park and Stadium

=== FELDA United ===
==== AFC Cup ====
===== Group stage =====
Pos	Team	Pld	W	D	L	GF	GA	GD	Pts	Qualification	CER	HAN	TAM	FEL
1	(Philippines) Ceres–Negros	6	3	2	1	16	8	+8	11 (Note: Head-to-head results: Hà Nội 1–1 Ceres–Negros, Ceres–Negros 6–2 Hà Nội.)	Zonal semi-finals	—	6–2	5–0	0–0
2	(Vietnam) Hà Nội	6	3	2	1	14	10	+4	11		1–1	—	4–0	4–1
3	(Singapore) Tampines Rovers	6	2	0	4	8	17	−9	6		2–4	1–2	—	2–1
4	(Malaysia) FELDA United	6	1	2	3	7	10	−3	5		3–0	1–1	1–3	—

Source: AFC
Rules for classification: Group stage tiebreakers
