= 2017 Ceres–Negros F.C. season =

Ceres–Negros
2017 season
- Chairman: Leo Rey Yanson
- Head coach: Risto Vidaković
- Stadium: Panaad Stadium
- PFL: 2nd (Regular Season); 1st (Final Series)
- AFC Cup: Inter-zone Play-off Semifinal
- Singapore Cup: Preliminary Round
- Top goalscorer: League: Bienvenido Marañón (22); All: Bienvenido Marañón (30)
- Highest home attendance: 8,965 vs Felda United (15 March 2017)
Home colours	Away colours
- All statistics correct as of 16 December 2017.

The 2017 season is Ceres–Negros' 1st season in the Philippines Football League (PFL), the top flight of Philippines football. They finished second in the PFL regular season though they became the league's first champions after they won over Global Cebu in the Final Series.

They also participated in the 2017 AFC Cup where they become the ASEAN zonal champions though they were eliminated by Tajik club Istiklol in the inter-zone Play-off semifinal.

== Competitions ==
=== Overview ===
Competition	First match	Last match	Starting round	Final position	Record							
Competition	First match	Last match	Starting round	Final position	Pld	W	D	L	GF	GA	GD	Win %
Philippines Football League	6 May 2017	16 December 2017	Matchday 1	2nd (League Table) / 1st (Final Series)	31	20	6	5	83	29	+54	64.52
AFC Cup	21 February 2017	12 September 2017	Group Stage	Inter-zone Play-off Semifinal	12	5	3	4	24	19	+5	41.67
Singapore Cup	20 June 2017	20 June 2017	Preliminary Round	Preliminary round	1	0	0	1	0	1	−1	0.00
Total					44	25	9	10	107	49	+58	56.82

Last updated: 16 December 2017
Source: Competitions

=== Philippines Football League ===
Pos	Team	Pld	W	D	L	GF	GA	GD	Pts	Qualification or relegation
1	Meralco Manila	28	17	7	4	43	33	+10	58	Qualification for finals series
2	Ceres–Negros (C)	28	17	6	5	76	27	+49	57	Qualification for finals series
3	Kaya FC–Makati	28	14	5	9	52	35	+17	47	Qualification for finals series
4	Global Cebu	28	13	8	7	47	37	+10	47	Qualification for finals series
5	Stallion Laguna	28	9	8	11	39	49	−10	35	
6	JPV Marikina	28	9	6	13	42	48	−6	33	
7	Davao Aguilas	28	4	10	14	35	56	−21	22	
8	Ilocos United	28	1	6	21	24	73	−49	9	

Source: Philippines Football League
Rules for classification: 1) Points; 2) Goal Difference; 3) Goals Scored
(C) Champions

==== Regular season ====
6 May 2017 1	Kaya FC–Makati	1–1	Ceres–Negros	Makati
16:00 UTC+8	Angeles 69'	Report	Ramsay 44'	Stadium: University of Makati Stadium

3 June 2017 2	Ceres–Negros	1–0	Global Cebu	Bacolod
16:00 UTC+8	Christiaens 83'	Report		Stadium: Panaad Stadium

17 June 2017 3	JPV Marikina	2–1	Ceres–Negros	Manila^{a}
16:00 UTC+8	Uesato 56' (pen.); Baguioro 79'	Report	Marañón 84'	Stadium: Rizal Memorial Stadium; Referee: Ariel Montana

24 June 2017 4	Ceres–Negros	3–1	Kaya FC–Makati	Biñan
19:00 UTC+8	Marañón 45+2', 69' (pen.), 88'	Report	Mendy 55'	Stadium: Biñan Football Stadium

28 June 2017 5	Ceres–Negros	5–1	Stallion Laguna	Bacolod
16:00 UTC+8	Marañón 18', 37'; Rodríguez 44', 57', 84'	Report	Melliza 27'	Stadium: Panaad Stadium

1 July 2017 6	Ceres–Negros	5–2	Stallion Laguna	Bacolod
16:00 UTC+8	Schröck 13'; Christiaens 27'; Ramsay 30'; Porteria 33'; Marañón 54' (pen.)	Report	Doctora 76'; Linatoc 81'	Stadium: Panaad Stadium

5 July 2017 7	Global Cebu	1–0	Ceres–Negros	Cebu City
19:00 UTC+8	Hartmann 43'	Report		Stadium: Cebu City Sports Complex

8 July 2017 8	Ceres–Negros	7–0	Ilocos United	Bacolod
16:00 UTC+8	Schröck 11'; Christiaens 24'; Rodríguez 31'; Porteria 69', 72'; Reichelt 83', 90+2'	Report		Stadium: Panaad Stadium

15 July 2017 9	Meralco Manila	0–7	Ceres–Negros	Manila
16:00 UTC+8		Report	Rodríguez 17', 20'; Ramsay 37', 50', 73'; Schröck 51'; Sarmiento 90+1' (o.g.)	Stadium: Rizal Memorial Stadium

22 July 2017 10	Ceres–Negros	2–0	Davao Aguilas	Bacolod
16:00 UTC+8	Porteria 27'; Schröck 57'			Stadium: Panaad Stadium

12 August 2017 11	Kaya FC–Makati	2–3	Ceres–Negros	Makati
16:00 UTC+8	Mendy 51'; Mintah 90+1'		Nazari 19'; Pasinabo 49'; Marañón 62'	Stadium: University of Makati Stadium

16 August 2017 12	Ceres–Negros	1–2	Meralco Manila	Bacolod
16:00 UTC+8	Súper 71'		Dizon 53'; Greatwich 73'	Stadium: Panaad Stadium

16 September 2017 13	Davao Aguilas	1–3	Ceres–Negros	Manila^{c}
16:00 UTC+8	Sawyer 90+1'		Rodríguez 19'; Marañón 51'; Christiaens 87'	Stadium: Rizal Memorial Stadium

20 September 2017 14	Davao Aguilas	1–1	Ceres–Negros	Tagum
16:00 UTC+8	J. Younghusband 27'		Rodríguez 73'	Stadium: Davao del Norte Sports Complex

24 September 2017 15	Ceres–Negros	1–0	Global Cebu	Bacolod
16:00 UTC+8	Schröck 79'			Stadium: Panaad Stadium

30 September 2017 16	Ceres–Negros	5–0	Ilocos United	Bacolod
19:00 UTC+8	Marañón 5'; Rodríguez 19' de Murga 28'; Schröck 35', 73'			Stadium: Panaad Stadium

14 October 2017 17	Ceres–Negros	3–2	Kaya FC–Makati	Bacolod
19:00 UTC+8	Marañón 10'; Rodríguez 15', 90+4'		Mintah 3'; Osei 56'	Stadium: Panaad Stadium

18 October 2017 18	Ceres–Negros	2–2	JPV Marikina	Bacolod
19:00 UTC+8	Rodríguez 23' (pen.), 42'		Uesato 71'; Odawara 83' (pen.)	Stadium: Panaad Stadium

21 October 2017 19	Stallion Laguna	0–1	Ceres–Negros	Biñan
19:00 UTC+8			Marañón 28'	Stadium: Biñan Football Stadium

25 October 2017 20	Stallion Laguna	2–0	Ceres–Negros	Biñan
16:00 UTC+8	Mascazzini 45+1'; Doctora 60'			Stadium: Biñan Football Stadium

28 October 2017 21	Ceres–Negros	5–0	JPV Marikina	Bacolod
16:00 UTC+8	Rodríguez 3'; Marañón 5', 80'; Ramsay 7'; Porteria 49'			Stadium: Panaad Stadium

2 November 2017 22	Ceres–Negros	5–1	Davao Aguilas	Bacolod
19:00 UTC+8	Rodríguez 1', 33', 39'; Reichelt 14'; Marañón 30'		Guirado 27'	Stadium: Panaad Stadium

5 November 2017 23	Ceres–Negros	6–0	Meralco Manila	Bacolod
19:00 UTC+8	Marañón 22', 67' de Murga 28'; Rodríguez 30', 36', 54'			Stadium: Panaad Stadium

8 November 2017 24	JPV Marikina	2–2	Ceres–Negros	Biñan^{a}
15:00 UTC+8	Belgira 29'; Mahmoud 68'		Rodríguez 25'; Marañón 34'	Stadium: Biñan Football Stadium

18 November 2017 25	Ilocos United	1–1	Ceres–Negros	Bantay^{b}
19:00 UTC+8	Mitter 35'		Pasinabo Jr. 77'	Stadium: Quirino Stadium

21 November 2017 26	Ilocos United	1–5	Ceres–Negros	Bantay^{b}
16:00 UTC+8	Uzoka 62'		Reichelt 29', 58'; Ingreso 72'; Marañón 86', 89'	Stadium: Quirino Stadium

24 November 2017 27	Meralco Manila	0–0	Ceres–Negros	Manila
19:00 UTC+8				Stadium: Rizal Memorial Stadium

28 November 2017 28	Global Cebu	2–0	Ceres–Negros	Cebu City
19:00 UTC+8	Sanchez 7'; Bahadoran 33'			Stadium: Cebu City Sports Complex

Note:

- a Because of the ongoing works in the Marikina Sports Complex, the team will play its first few league games at the Biñan Football Stadium and Rizal Memorial Stadium and will have to groundshare with Stallion Laguna and Meralco Manila, respectively.
- b The home stadium of the club is located in Bantay, Ilocos Sur, a nearby town of Vigan. For administrative and marketing purposes, the home city of Ilocos United is designated as "Vigan"
- c Because of the unavailability of the Davao del Norte Sports Complex, the match was played instead in Rizal Memorial Stadium, Manila.

==== Final Series ====
2 December 2017 Semi Final Leg 1	Kaya FC–Makati	0–1	Ceres–Negros	Makati
16:00UTC+8			Schröck 90+4'	Stadium: University of Makati Stadium

9 December 2017 Semi Final Leg 2	Ceres–Negros	2–1 (3–1 agg.)	Kaya FC–Makati	Bacolod
19:00 UTC+8	Marañón 30'; Ramsay 73'		Ugarte 43'	Stadium: Panaad Stadium

Ceres–Negros won 3–1 on aggregate.

16 December 2017 Finals	Ceres–Negros	4–1	Global Cebu	Bacolod
18:00 UTC+8	Marañón 4'; Ramsay 20', 27', 61'		Roberts 89'	Stadium: Panaad Stadium; Attendance: 2,553

=== AFC Cup ===
==== Group stage ====
Pos	Team	Pld	W	D	L	GF	GA	GD	Pts	Qualification	CER	HAN	TAM	FEL
1	(Philippines) Ceres–Negros	6	3	2	1	16	8	+8	11 (Note: Head-to-head results: Hà Nội 1–1 Ceres–Negros, Ceres–Negros 6–2 Hà Nội.)	Zonal semi-finals	—	6–2	5–0	0–0
2	(Vietnam) Hà Nội	6	3	2	1	14	10	+4	11		1–1	—	4–0	4–1
3	(Singapore) Tampines Rovers	6	2	0	4	8	17	−9	6		2–4	1–2	—	2–1
4	(Malaysia) FELDA United	6	1	2	3	7	10	−3	5		3–0	1–1	1–3	—

Source: AFC
Rules for classification: Group stage tiebreakers
Notes:

21 February 2017 Matchday 1	Hà Nội (Vietnam)	1–1	(Philippines) Ceres–Negros	Hanoi
18:00 UTC+7	Văn Dũng (yellow card) 41'; Văn Quyết 57'; Quang Hải (yellow card) 84'	Report	Ott (yellow card) 18'; Herrera (yellow card) 36'; Marañón 49'	Stadium: Mỹ Đình National Stadium; Attendance: 2,600; Referee: Yaqoub Al-Hammadi (United Arab Emirates)

7 March 2017 Matchday 2	Ceres–Negros (Philippines)	5–0	(Singapore) Tampines Rovers	Bacolod
19:30 UTC+8	Ramsay 1'; Marañón 24', 64'; Ott 38'; Fernando 72'	Report	Yong-chan (yellow card) 86'	Stadium: Panaad Park and Stadium; Attendance: 8,000; Referee: Kim Woo-sung (South Korea)

15 March 2017 Matchday 3	Ceres–Negros (Philippines)	0–0	(Malaysia) Felda United	Bacolod
19:30 UTC+8	Ramsay (yellow card) 77'; Ott (yellow card) 89'; Steuble (yellow card) 90'	Report	Yusof (yellow card) 32'; Hadin (yellow card) 40'; Cano (yellow card) 40'	Stadium: Panaad Park and Stadium; Attendance: 8,965; Referee: Wang Di (China)

4 April 2017 Matchday 4	Felda United (Malaysia)	3–0	(Philippines) Ceres–Negros	Shah Alam
16:45 UTC+8	Syahid 5'; Alias (yellow card) 23'; Hadin 66'; Fazrul 77'	Report	Steuble (yellow card) 26' de Jong (yellow card) 85'	Stadium: Shah Alam Stadium; Attendance: 250; Referee: Shukri Al-Hunfush (Saudi Arabia)

19 April 2017 Matchday 5	Ceres–Negros (Philippines)	6–2	(Vietnam) Hà Nội	Bacolod
19:30 UTC+8	Marañón 13' (pen.), 90'; Ingreso 21'; Herrera (yellow card) 23'; Fernando 53'; Kawase (yellow card) 60'; Silva 69' (o.g.) de Jong 89'	Report	Thành Lương 25'; Văn Quyết (yellow card) 26'; Duy Mạnh (yellow card) 34'; Ngọc Đức (yellow card) 52'; Samson (red card) 62'; Hùng Dũng 86' (pen.)	Stadium: Panaad Park and Stadium; Attendance: 8,366; Referee: Jameel Abdulhusin (Bahrain)

3 May 2017 Matchday 6	Tampines Rovers (Singapore)	2–4	(Philippines) Ceres–Negros	Kallang
19:30 UTC+8	Yong-chan (yellow card) 15'; Yasir 24', 60' (pen.); Shakir (red card) 27'; Fahrudin (yellow card) 35'; Ismadi (yellow card) 43'	Report	Marañón 6', 22'; Fernando (yellow card) 30', (goal) 44' (pen.); Kawase 65'; Steuble (yellow card) 82'	Stadium: Jalan Besar Stadium; Attendance: 856; Referee: Masoud Tufayelieh (Syria)

==== Knockout stage ====
===== ASEAN Zonal Semifinal =====
17 May 2017 First leg	Johor Darul Ta'zim F.C. (Malaysia)	3–2	(Philippines) Ceres–Negros	Johor Bahru
20:45 UTC+8	Tan (yellow card) 8'; Cabrera 18'; Kunanlan (yellow card) 35'; Safiq 45+1'; Nasrulhaq (yellow card) 45+1'; Hazwan 68'; Marlias (yellow card) 87'	Report	Fernando 21'; Marañón 25' de Jong (yellow card) 73'	Stadium: Tan Sri Dato Haji Hassan Yunos Stadium; Attendance: 14,220; Referee: Rowan Arumughan (India)

30 May 2017 Second leg	Ceres–Negros (Philippines)	2–1 (4^{a}–4 agg.)	(Malaysia) Johor Darul Ta'zim F.C.	Bacolod
19:30 UTC+8	Kawase 26'; Fernando 90+3' (pen.); Herrera (yellow card) 90+7'	Report	António (yellow card) 43'; Guerra 65', (yellow card) 65'; Bakri (yellow card) 82'; Marlias (red card) 90+5'; Rasid (yellow card) 90+8'	Stadium: Panaad Park and Stadium; Attendance: 5,687; Referee: Fu Ming (China)

4–4 on aggregate. Ceres–Negros won 2–1 on away goals.

===== ASEAN Zonal Final =====
2 August 2017 First leg	Home United (Singapore)	2–1	(Philippines) Ceres–Negros	Kallang
19:30 UTC+8	Plazibat 11' (pen.); Camara (yellow card) 19'; Izzdin (yellow card) 59'; Irfan (yellow card) 77'; Hariss 83'	Report	Christiaens (yellow card) 7'; Manuel Ott (yellow card) 33'; Steuble 45+3'; Herrera (yellow card) 74'	Stadium: Jalan Besar Stadium; Attendance: 3,024; Referee: Hiroyuki Kimura (Japan)

9 August 2017 Second leg	Ceres–Negros (Philippines)	2–0	(Singapore) Home United	Bacolod
19:30 UTC+8	Porteria 2'; Ott 42'; Ingreso (yellow card) 45+2'; Herrera (yellow card) 68'; Marañón (yellow card) 84'	Report	Yunos (yellow card) 41'; Nizam (yellow card) 63'; Camara (yellow card) 90+1'	Stadium: Panaad Park and Stadium; Attendance: 7,534; Referee: Hettikamkanamge Perera (Sri Lanka)

Ceres–Negros won 3–2 on aggregate.

===== Inter-zone Play-off Semifinal =====
22 August 2017 First leg	Istiklol (Tajikistan)	4–0	(Philippines) Ceres–Negros	Dushanbe
19:00 UTC+5	Juraboev (yellow card) 13'; Mawutor (yellow card) 21'; Nazarov 25' (pen.), (yellow card) 60'; Jalilov 45'; Dzhalilov 67', 88'	Report	Schröck (yellow card) 72'; Marañón (yellow card) 86'	Stadium: Pamir Stadium; Attendance: 13,800; Referee: Nivon Robesh Gamini (Sri Lanka)

12 September 2017 Second leg	Ceres–Negros (Philippines)	1–1	(Tajikistan) Istiklol	Bacolod
19:30 UTC+8	Ingreso (yellow card) 4'; López 34'; Marañón (yellow card) 85'	Report	Amirbek (yellow card) 12'; Mawutor (yellow card) 24'; Fathullo (yellow card) 24'; Barkov 45+1' (yellow card) 85'; Baranovskyi (red card) 70'	Stadium: Panaad Park and Stadium; Attendance: 4,752; Referee: Ko Hyung-jin (South Korea)

Istikol won 5–1 on aggregate.

=== Singapore Cup ===
20 June 2017 Preliminary Round	Hougang United (Singapore)	1–0	(Philippines) Ceres–Negros	Hougang
20:30 UTC+8	Vieterale 77'			Stadium: Hougang Stadium; Referee: Sukbir Singh

== Statistics ==
=== Goalscorers ===
As of 16 December 2017

Rank	Player	Nat	Position	PFL	AFC Cup	Singapore Cup	Total
1	Bienvenido Marañón	(Spain)	FW	22	8	0	30
2	Fernando Rodríguez	(Spain)	FW	21	5	0	26
3	Iain Ramsay	(Philippines)	MF	10	1	0	11
4	Stephan Shröck	(Philippines)	MF	8	0	0	8
5	OJ Porteria	(Philippines)	MF	5	1	0	6
6	Patrick Reichelt	(Philippines)	FW	5	0	0	5
7	Jeffrey Christiaens	(Philippines)	MF	4	0	0	4
8	Arnie Pasinabo Jr.	(Philippines)	DF	2	0	0	2
8	Súper	(Spain)	DF	1	1	0	2
8	Carli de Murga	(Philippines)	MF	2	0	0	2
8	Kevin Ingreso	(Philippines)	MF	1	1	0	2
8	Manuel Ott	(Philippines)	MF	0	2	0	2
8	Kota Kawase	(Japan)	DF	0	2	0	2
14	Omid Nazari	(Philippines)	MF	1	0	0	1
14	Jason de Jong	(Philippines)	DF	0	1	0	1
14	Martin Steuble	(Philippines)	MF	0	1	0	1
Own goals				1	1	0	2
Total				83	24	0	107

== League squad ==
As of 12 September 2017.

Squad No.	Name	Nationality	Position(s)	Date of birth (Age)	Previous club
Goalkeepers
1	Roland Müller	(Philippines) (Germany)	GK	2 March 1988 (age 38)	(Switzerland) Étoile Carouge FC
25	Louie Casas	(Philippines)	GK	12 March 1986 (age 40)	(Philippines) University of St. La Salle
88	Eduard Sacapaño	(Philippines)	GK	14 February 1980 (age 46)	(Philippines) Global FC
Defenders
2	Joshua Grommen	(Philippines) (Netherlands)	DF	10 July 1996 (age 30)	(Australia) Western Pride FC
3	Kota Kawase	(Japan)	DF	8 November 1992 (age 33)	(Australia) Bonnyrigg White Eagles FC
4	Súper	(Spain)	DF	21 November 1991 (age 34)	(Spain) Caudal Deportivo
16	Arnie Pasinabo Jr.	(Philippines)	DF	4 February 1996 (age 30)	(Philippines) Green Archers United FC
17	Junior Muñoz	(Philippines) (Netherlands)	DF	18 May 1987 (age 39)	(Philippines) Kaya F.C.
21	Luke Woodland	(Philippines) (England)	DF	21 July 1995 (age 31)	(England) York City F.C.
Midfielder
6	Kevin Ingreso	(Philippines) (Germany)	MF	10 February 1993 (age 33)	(Germany) SV Drochtersen/Assel
8	Manuel Ott	(Philippines) (Germany)	MF	6 May 1992 (age 34)	(Germany) FC Ingolstadt 04 II
10	OJ Porteria	(Philippines) (United States)	MF	9 May 1994 (age 32)	(Philippines) Kaya F.C.
11	Iain Ramsay	(Philippines) (Australia)	MF	27 February 1988 (age 38)	(Iran) Tractor Sazi F.C.
12	Stephan Schröck	(Philippines) (Germany)	MF	21 August 1986 (age 40)	(Germany) SpVgg Greuther Fürth
14	Carli de Murga	(Philippines) (Spain)	MF	30 November 1988 (age 37)	(Philippines) Global Cebu F.C.
20	Jorrel Aristorenas	(Philippines) (England)	MF	1 March 1994 (age 32)	(Philippines) Loyola Meralco Sparks F.C
22	Omid Nazari	(Philippines) (Iran)	MF	29 April 1991 (age 35)	(Malaysia) Melaka United F.C.
23	Martin Steuble	(Philippines) (Switzerland)	MF	9 June 1988 (age 38)	(United States) Sporting Kansas City
28	Jeffrey Christiaens	(Philippines) (Belgium)	MF	17 May 1991 (age 35)	(Philippines) Global Cebu F.C.
Strikers
7	Bienvenido Marañón	(Spain)	FW	15 May 1986 (age 40)	(Spain) UD Socuéllamos
9	Fernando Rodríguez	(Spain)	FW	11 May 1987 (age 39)	(Spain) FC Cartagena
29	Patrick Reichelt	(Philippines) (Germany)	FW	15 June 1988 (age 38)	(Thailand) Port F.C.

== Transfers ==
=== Preseason ===
==== In ====
Position	Player	Transferred From
GK	(Philippines) (Germany) Roland Müller	(Switzerland) Servette FC
DF	(Japan) Kota Kawase	(Australia) Bonnyrigg White Eagles FC
DF	(Philippines) (Italy) Simone Rota	(Philippines) Stallion Laguna F.C.
DF	(Spain) Súper	(Spain) Caudal Deportivo
DF	(Philippines) (Netherlands) Junior Muñoz	(Philippines) Kaya FC
DF	(Philippines) (England) Luke Woodland	(England) York City F.C.
MF	(Philippines) (Germany) Stephan Schröck	(Germany) SpVgg Greuther Fürth
MF	(Philippines) (Australia) Iain Ramsay	(Iran) Tractor Sazi F.C.
MF	(Philippines) (United States) OJ Porteria	(Philippines) Kaya FC
MF	(Philippines) (England) Jorrel Aristorenas	(Philippines) Loyola Meralco Sparks FC
MF	(Spain) Antonio Bello	(Spain) FC Jumilla
MF	(Philippines) (Iran) Omid Nazari	(Malaysia) Melaka United F.C.
MF	(Philippines) (Netherlands) Jason de Jong	(Philippines) Loyola Meralco Sparks FC
FW	(Spain) Fernando Rodríguez	(Spain) FC Cartagena

==== Out ====
Position	Player	Transferred To
DF	(Philippines) Jason Sabio	
DF	(Ghana) Valentine Kama	(Philippines) Ilocos United FC
DF	(South Korea) Sang-Min Kim	(India) Minerva Punjab FC
DF	(Philippines) Jalsor Soriano	(Philippines) Kaya FC
MF	(South Korea) Son Yong-chan	(Singapore) Tampines Rovers
MF	(Philippines) (Italy) Marwin Angeles	(Philippines) Kaya FC
MF	(Philippines) (Netherlands) Paul Mulders	(Philippines) Global FC
MF	(Philippines) (Spain) Juan Luis Guirado	(Spain) Real Burgos CF
FW	(Spain) Adrián Gallardo	(Maldives) New Radiant S.C.
FW	(Philippines) (United States) Nate Burkey	(Philippines) Davao Aguilas F.C.
FW	(South Korea) Jeong-Woo Lee	Released

=== Mid-season ===
==== In ====
Position	Player	Transferred From
MF	(Philippines) Joshua Dutosme	(Philippines) University of St. La Salle
MF	(Philippines) Nessi Ramos	(Philippines) University of St. La Salle

==== Out ====
Position	Player	Transferred To
DF	(Philippines) (Italy) Simone Rota	(Philippines) Davao Aguilas F.C.
MF	(Spain) Antonio Bello	(Spain) Xerez Deportivo FC
MF	(Philippines) (Netherlands) Jason de Jong	(Philippines) Davao Aguilas F.C.
MF	(Philippines) (England) Jorrel Aristorenas	(Philippines) Davao Aguilas F.C.
