= 2017 AFC Cup final =

- Event: 2017 AFC Cup
Istiklol	Al-Quwa Al-Jawiya
(Tajikistan)	(Iraq)
0	1
- Date: 4 November 2017
- Venue: Hisor Central Stadium, Hisor
- Referee: Mohammed Abdulla Hassan Mohamed (United Arab Emirates)
- Attendance: 20,000
- Weather: Windy; 16°C

The 2017 AFC Cup final was the final match of the 2017 AFC Cup, the 14th edition of the AFC Cup, Asia's secondary club football tournament organized by the Asian Football Confederation (AFC).

The final was contested as a single match between Tajik team Istiklol and Iraqi team Al-Quwa Al-Jawiya. The match was hosted by Istiklol at the Hisor Central Stadium in Hisor on 4 November 2017.

Al-Quwa Al-Jawiya defeated Istiklol 1–0 and were crowned AFC Cup champions for the second consecutive year.

== Teams ==
Team	Zone	Previous finals appearances (bold indicates winners)
(Tajikistan) Istiklol	Central Asia Zone (CAFA) (Inter-zone play-off winner)	1 (2015)
(Iraq) Al-Quwa Al-Jawiya	West Asia Zone (WAFF)	1 (**2016**)

== Venue ==
Hisor Central Stadium, in Hisor, Tajikistan, hosted the match. This was the second time that an AFC Cup final was played in Tajikistan, with the previous final being 2015.

== Road to the final ==
Note: In all results below, the score of the finalist is given first (H: home; A: away).

(Tajikistan) Istiklol				Round		(Iraq) Al-Quwa Al-Jawiya			
Opponent	Result			Group stage		Opponent	Result		
(Kyrgyzstan) Dordoi	2–0 (H)			Matchday 1		(Lebanon) Safa	0–0 (A)		
(Turkmenistan) Altyn Asyr	1–1 (A)			Matchday 2		(Bahrain) Al-Hidd	2–1 (H)		
(Kyrgyzstan) Alay Osh	3–1 (H)			Matchday 3		(Syria) Al-Wahda	0–0 (A)		
(Kyrgyzstan) Alay Osh	4–1 (A)			Matchday 4		(Syria) Al-Wahda	1–1 (H)		
(Kyrgyzstan) Dordoi	4–1 (A)			Matchday 5		(Lebanon) Safa	2–0 (H)		
(Turkmenistan) Altyn Asyr	1–0 (H)			Matchday 6		(Bahrain) Al-Hidd	1–0 (A)		
**Group D winners**: Pos / Team / Pld / Pts; **1** / (Tajikistan) Istiklol / **6** / **16**; 2 / (Turkmenistan) Altyn Asyr / 6 / **13**; 3 / (Kyrgyzstan) Dordoi / 6 / **3**; 4 / (Kyrgyzstan) Alay Osh / 6 / **3**; Source: AFC				Final standings		**Group B winners**: Pos / Team / Pld / Pts; **1** / (Iraq) Al-Quwa Al-Jawiya / **6** / **12**; 2 / (Syria) Al-Wahda / 6 / **11**; 3 / (Bahrain) Al-Hidd / 6 / **9**; 4 / (Lebanon) Safa / 6 / **1**; Source: AFC			
Opponent	Agg.	1st leg	2nd leg	Knockout stage		Opponent	Agg.	1st leg	2nd leg
(Philippines) Ceres–Negros	5–1	4–0 (H)	1–1 (A)	Inter-zone play-off semi-finals	Zonal semi-finals	(Iraq) Al-Zawraa	2–1	1–1 (H)	1–0 (A)
(India) Bengaluru FC	3–2	1–0 (H)	2–2 (A)	Inter-zone play-off final	Zonal finals	(Syria) Al-Wahda	2–2 (a)	1–2 (A)	1–0 (H)

== Format ==
The final was played as a single match, with the host team (winner of the Inter-zone play-off final) decided by draw, which was held on 6 June 2017. If tied after regulation, extra time and, if necessary, penalty shoot-out was used to decide the winner.

== Match ==
=== Details ===
4 November 2017
18:00 UTC+5

Istiklol (Tajikistan)	0–1	(Iraq) Al-Quwa Al-Jawiya
	Report	Mohsin 68'

Hisor Central Stadium, Hisor
Attendance: 20,000
Referee: Mohammed Abdulla Hassan Mohamed (United Arab Emirates)

**Istiklol**	**Al-Quwa Al-Jawiya**

GK	1	(Serbia) Nikola Stošić
RB	27	(Ukraine) Oleksandr Stetsenko
CB	5	(Ukraine) Artem Baranovskyi
CB	2	(Tajikistan) Siyovush Asrorov	(yellow card) 60'
LB	19	(Tajikistan) Akhtam Nazarov
RM	9	(Tajikistan) Jahongir Aliev		(substituted off) 88'
CM	8	(Tajikistan) Nuriddin Davronov		(substituted off) 72'
CM	4	(Ghana) David Mawutor
LM	18	(Tajikistan) Fatkhullo Fatkhuloev	(yellow card) 56'
CF	10	(Russia) Dmitry Barkov
CF	63	(Tajikistan) Manuchekhr Dzhalilov		(substituted off) 74'
Substitutes:
GK	35	(Tajikistan) Kurban Boboev
DF	3	(Tajikistan) Tabrezi Davlatmir
MF	11	(Tajikistan) Muhammadjoni Hasan
MF	20	(Tajikistan) Amirbek Juraboev		(substituted on) 72'
MF	21	(Tajikistan) Romish Jalilov		(substituted on) 88'
MF	23	(Tajikistan) Ehson Panjshanbe
FW	17	(Tajikistan) Dilshod Vasiev		(substituted on) 74'
Manager:
(Tajikistan) Mukhsin Mukhamadiev

GK	1	(Iraq) Fahad Talib
RB	6	(Iraq) Sameh Saeed
CB	2	(Iraq) Samal Saeed
CB	36	(Croatia) Sebastijan Antić
LB	33	(Iraq) Ali Bahjat
RM	7	(Iraq) Karrar Ali Bari	(yellow card) 87'	(substituted off) 90'
CM	18	(Syria) Zaher Midani	(yellow card) 66'
CM	40	(Syria) Khaled Mobayed
LM	11	(Iraq) Humam Tariq
CF	10	(Iraq) Hammadi Ahmad
CF	9	(Iraq) Emad Mohsin		(substituted off) 78'
Substitutes:
GK	21	(Iraq) Amjad Raheem
MF	5	(Iraq) Ahmed Abdul-Ridha		(substituted on) 90'
MF	27	(Iraq) Fahad Kareem
MF	30	(Iraq) Saif Salman		(substituted on) 78'
MF	32	(Iraq) Taher Hameed Moshin
FW	29	(Iraq) Amjad Radhi
FW	38	(Iraq) Ali Yousif
Manager:
(Syria) Hussam Al Sayed

Assistant referees:
Mohamed Al-Hammadi (United Arab Emirates)
Hasan Al-Mahri (United Arab Emirates)
Fourth official:
Ammar Al-Jeneibi (United Arab Emirates)
Fifth official:
Sabet Al-Ali (United Arab Emirates)

**Match rules**

- 90 minutes.
- 30 minutes of extra time if necessary.
- Penalty shoot-out if scores still level.
- Seven named substitutes, of which up to three may be used.

== See also ==
- 2017 AFC Champions League Final
