= 2017 AFC Cup group stage =

Football tournament group stage

The 2017 AFC Cup group stage was played from 20 February to 31 May 2017. A total of 34 teams competed in the group stage to decide the 11 places in the knockout stage of the 2017 AFC Cup.

== Draw ==
The draw for the group stage was held on 13 December 2016, 14:30 MYT (UTC+8), at the Hilton Petaling Jaya in Petaling Jaya, Malaysia. The 36 teams were drawn into nine groups of four: three groups each in the West Asia Zone (Groups A–C) and the ASEAN Zone (Groups F–H), and one group each in the Central Asia Zone (Group D), the South Asia Zone (Group E), and the East Asia Zone (Group I). Teams from the same association in the West Asia Zone and ASEAN Zone could not be drawn into the same group.

Due to the withdrawal of teams in the ASEAN Zone and the East Asia Zone after the draw, only 34 teams competed in the group stage, with Groups H and I having only three teams.

The seeding of each team in the draw was determined by their association and their qualifying position within their association. The mechanism of the draw was as follows:

- For the West Asia Zone, a draw was held for the five associations with two direct entrants (Iraq, Syria, Jordan, Bahrain, Lebanon) to determine the three associations occupying seeds 1 and 2, with seeds 1 placed in order for Groups A, B and C, and the two associations occupying seeds 3 and 4, with seeds 3 placed in order for Groups A and B. The remaining teams were then allocated to groups according to the rules set by AFC.
- For the ASEAN Zone, a draw was held for the four associations with two direct entrants (Vietnam, Malaysia, Myanmar, Philippines) to determine the three associations occupying seeds 1 and 2, with seeds 1 placed in order for Groups F, G and H, and the one association occupying seeds 3 and 4, with seed 3 placed in Group F. The remaining teams were then allocated to the groups according to the rules set by AFC.
- For the Central Asia Zone, the South Asia Zone, and the East Asia Zone, no draw was held, and the teams were allocated to the groups according to their association ranking published on 30 November 2016.

The following 34 teams entered into the group stage draw, which included the 29 direct entrants and the five winners of the play-off round of the qualifying play-offs, whose identity were not known at the time of the draw. Originally there were 30 direct entrants and six winners of the play-off round, but there were one fewer direct entrant in the ASEAN Zone due to the withdrawal of one team, and the East Asia Zone qualifying play-offs were not played due to the withdrawal of three teams.

| Zone | Groups | Seed 1 | Seed 2 | Seed 3 | Seed 4 |
|---|---|---|---|---|---|
| West Asia Zone | A–C | (Iraq) Al-Zawraa (Note: The seeding of the first and second group stage teams from Iraq, Syria, Jordan, Bahrain, and Lebanon were determined by draw.) | (Iraq) Al-Quwa Al-Jawiya | (Syria) Al-Jaish | (Syria) Al-Wahda |
| West Asia Zone | A–C | (Bahrain) Al-Hidd | (Bahrain) Al-Muharraq | (Lebanon) Safa | (Lebanon) Nejmeh |
| West Asia Zone | A–C | (Jordan) Al-Wehdat | (Jordan) Al-Ahli | (Oman) Saham | (Oman) Al-Suwaiq (Play-off West Asia) |
| Central Asia Zone | D | (Tajikistan) Istiklol | (Turkmenistan) Altyn Asyr | (Kyrgyzstan) Alay Osh | (Kyrgyzstan) Dordoi (Play-off Central Asia) |
| South Asia Zone | E | (India) Bengaluru | (Maldives) Maziya | (Bangladesh) Abahani Limited Dhaka | (India) Mohun Bagan (Play-off South Asia) |
| ASEAN Zone | F–H | (Malaysia) Johor Darul Ta'zim (Note: The seeding of the first and second group stage teams from Vietnam, Malaysia, Myanmar, and Philippines were determined by draw.) | (Malaysia) FELDA United | (Philippines) Global Cebu | (Philippines) Ceres–Negros |
| ASEAN Zone | F–H | (Vietnam) Hà Nội | (Vietnam) Than Quảng Ninh | (Singapore) Tampines Rovers | (Singapore) Home United (Play-off ASEAN 1) |
| ASEAN Zone | F–H | (Myanmar) Yadanarbon | (Myanmar) Magwe | ~~(Laos) Lanexang United~~ (Note: Lanexang United (Laos) withdrew from the group stage after the draw (originally drawn in Group H), and were not replaced, and only 11 teams competed in the ASEAN Zone group stage.) | (Cambodia) Boeung Ket Angkor (Play-off ASEAN 2) |
| East Asia Zone | I | (North Korea) April 25 | ~~(Guam) Rovers~~ (Note: Rovers (Guam) and Taipower (Chinese Taipei) withdrew from the group stage after the draw (both originally drawn in Group I), and Tatung (Chinese Taipei) withdrew from the qualifying play-offs, and thus Kigwancha (North Korea) and Erchim (Mongolia) advanced directly from the play-off round and preliminary round respectively to the group stage to replace them, and only three teams competed in the East Asia Zone group stage, and the East Asia Zone qualifying play-offs were not played.) | ~~(Chinese Taipei) Taipower~~ (North Korea) Kigwancha | ~~(Play-off East Asia)~~ (Mongolia) Erchim |

Standby teams (Note: The standby teams would replace a team from the same association which played in the AFC Champions League qualifying play-offs and advanced to the AFC Champions League group stage. There were no standby teams from Bahrain (for Al-Hidd).)

- ~~(Jordan) Al-Jazeera (for Al-Wehdat)~~
- ~~(India) East Bengal (for Bengaluru)~~
- ~~(Vietnam) SHB Đà Nẵng (for Hà Nội)~~
- ~~(Malaysia) Kedah (for Johor Darul Ta'zim)~~
- ~~(Myanmar) Yangon United (for Yadanarbon)~~
- ~~(Philippines) Loyola Meralco Sparks (for Global Cebu)~~
- ~~(Singapore) Geylang International (for Tampines Rovers)~~

== Format ==
In the group stage, each group was played on a home-and-away round-robin basis. The following teams advanced to the knockout stage:

- The winners of each group and the best runners-up in the West Asia Zone and the ASEAN Zone advanced to the Zonal semi-finals.
- The winners of each group in the Central Asia Zone, the South Asia Zone, and the East Asia Zone advanced to the Inter-zone play-off semi-finals.

=== Tiebreakers ===
The teams were ranked according to points (3 points for a win, 1 point for a draw, 0 points for a loss). If tied on points, tiebreakers were applied in the following order (Regulations Article 10.5):

1. Points in head-to-head matches among tied teams;
2. Goal difference in head-to-head matches among tied teams;
3. Goals scored in head-to-head matches among tied teams;
4. Away goals scored in head-to-head matches among tied teams;
5. If more than two teams are tied, and after applying all head-to-head criteria above, a subset of teams are still tied, all head-to-head criteria above are reapplied exclusively to this subset of teams;
6. Goal difference in all group matches;
7. Goals scored in all group matches;
8. Penalty shoot-out if only two teams are tied and they met in the last round of the group;
9. Disciplinary points (yellow card = 1 point, red card as a result of two yellow cards = 3 points, direct red card = 3 points, yellow card followed by direct red card = 4 points);
10. Team from the higher-ranked association.

== Schedule ==
The schedule of each matchday was as follows (W: West Asia Zone; C: Central Asia Zone; S: South Asia Zone; A: ASEAN Zone; E: East Asia Zone). Matches in the West Asia Zone were played on Mondays and Tuesdays, while matches in the Central Asia Zone, the South Asia Zone, the ASEAN Zone, and the East Asia Zone were played on Tuesdays and Wednesdays.

| Matchday | Dates | | Matches |
| Matchday | W, A | C, S, E | Matches |
|---|---|---|---|
| Matchday 1 | 20–22 February 2017 | 14 March 2017 | Team 1 vs. Team 4, Team 3 vs. Team 2 |
| Matchday 2 | 6–8 March 2017 | 4 April 2017 | Team 4 vs. Team 3, Team 2 vs. Team 1 |
| Matchday 3 | 13–15 March 2017 | 18–19 April 2017 | Team 4 vs. Team 2, Team 1 vs. Team 3 |
| Matchday 4 | 3–5 April 2017 | 3 May 2017 | Team 2 vs. Team 4, Team 3 vs. Team 1 |
| Matchday 5 | 17–19 April 2017 | 17 May 2017 | Team 4 vs. Team 1, Team 2 vs. Team 3 |
| Matchday 6 | 1–3 May 2017 | 31 May 2017 | Team 1 vs. Team 2, Team 3 vs. Team 4 |

== Groups ==
=== Group A ===
| Pos | Team | Pld | W | D | L | GF | GA | GD | Pts | Qualification | ZAW | JAI | AHL | SUW |
|---|---|---|---|---|---|---|---|---|---|---|---|---|---|---|
| 1 | (Iraq) Al-Zawraa | 6 | 3 | 3 | 0 | 9 | 3 | +6 | 12 | Zonal semi-finals | — | 3–1 | 1–1 | 0–0 |
| 2 | (Syria) Al-Jaish | 6 | 3 | 0 | 3 | 6 | 9 | −3 | 9 | | 0–3 | — | 1–0 | 1–2 |
| 3 | (Jordan) Al-Ahli | 6 | 1 | 3 | 2 | 5 | 6 | −1 | 6 | | 1–1 | 1–2 | — | 2–1 |
| 4 | (Oman) Al-Suwaiq | 6 | 1 | 2 | 3 | 3 | 5 | −2 | 5 | | 0–1 | 0–1 | 0–0 | — |

Source: AFC
Rules for classification: Group stage tiebreakers
20 February 2017
16:00 UTC+3

| Al-Jaish (Syria) | 1–0 | (Jordan) Al-Ahli |
|---|---|---|
| Hamdoko 24' | Report |

Al-Khor SC Stadium, Al Khor (Qatar) (Note: Teams from Syria are not allowed to host their home matches in their country due to security concerns.)
Attendance: 50
Referee: Sherzod Kasimov (Uzbekistan)
20 February 2017
18:00 UTC+3

| Al-Zawraa (Iraq) | 0–0 | (Oman) Al-Suwaiq |
|---|---|---|
| | Report |

Grand Hamad Stadium, Doha (Qatar) (Note: Teams from Iraq are not allowed to host their home matches in their country due to security concerns.)
Attendance: 100
Referee: Timur Faizullin (Kyrgyzstan)

6 March 2017
19:00 UTC+4

| Al-Suwaiq (Oman) | 0–1 | (Syria) Al-Jaish |
|---|---|---|
| | Report | Hamdoko 68' |

Sultan Qaboos Sports Complex, Muscat
Attendance: 1,200
Referee: Pranjal Banerjee (India)
6 March 2017
17:00 UTC+2

| Al-Ahli (Jordan) | 1–1 | (Iraq) Al-Zawraa |
|---|---|---|
| Tall 35' | Report | Abdul-Zahra 61' (pen.) |

Amman International Stadium, Amman
Attendance: 1,300
Referee: Khamis Al-Kuwari (Qatar)

13 March 2017
19:00 UTC+4

| Al-Suwaiq (Oman) | 0–0 | (Jordan) Al-Ahli |
|---|---|---|
| | Report |

Sultan Qaboos Sports Complex, Muscat
Attendance: 750
Referee: Çarymyrat Kurbanow (Turkmenistan)
13 March 2017
18:00 UTC+3

| Al-Zawraa (Iraq) | 3–1 | (Syria) Al-Jaish |
|---|---|---|
| Abdul-Raheem 41', 90+1'; Al Awad 50' (o.g.) | Report | Khashrif 54' |

Grand Hamad Stadium, Doha (Qatar)
Attendance: 100
Referee: Suhaizi Shukri (Malaysia)

4 April 2017
17:00 UTC+3

| Al-Ahli (Jordan) | 2–1 | (Oman) Al-Suwaiq |
|---|---|---|
| Tall 62'; Al-Essawi 76' | Report | Al-Sheyadi 55' |

Amman International Stadium, Amman
Attendance: 231
Referee: Sivakorn Pu-udom (Thailand)
4 April 2017
18:00 UTC+3

| Al-Jaish (Syria) | 0–3 | (Iraq) Al-Zawraa |
|---|---|---|
| | Report | Abdul-Raheem 48', 89'; Mhawi 68' |

Al-Khor SC Stadium, Al Khor (Qatar)
Attendance: 100
Referee: Yudai Yamamoto (Japan)

18 April 2017
19:00 UTC+4

| Al-Suwaiq (Oman) | 0–1 | (Iraq) Al-Zawraa |
|---|---|---|
| | Report | Kalaf 25' |

Sultan Qaboos Sports Complex, Muscat
Attendance: 500
Referee: Yaqoub Al-Hammadi (United Arab Emirates)
18 April 2017
18:00 UTC+3

| Al-Ahli (Jordan) | 1–2 | (Syria) Al-Jaish |
|---|---|---|
| Tall 85' | Report | Al Kaddour 22'; Kalfa 41' |

Amman International Stadium, Amman
Attendance: 150
Referee: Payam Heidari (Iran)

2 May 2017
18:00 UTC+3

| Al-Zawraa (Iraq) | 1–1 | (Jordan) Al-Ahli |
|---|---|---|
| Abdul-Zahra 90+2' (pen.) | Report | Al-Essawi 5' |

Grand Hamad Stadium, Doha (Qatar)
Attendance: 100
Referee: Ng Chiu Kok (Hong Kong)
2 May 2017
18:00 UTC+3

| Al-Jaish (Syria) | 1–2 | (Oman) Al-Suwaiq |
|---|---|---|
| Al Anizan 55' | Report | Diagné 69'; Kipré 73' |

Al-Khor SC Stadium, Al Khor (Qatar)
Attendance: 25
Referee: Suhaizi Shukri (Malaysia)

=== Group B ===
| Pos | Team | Pld | W | D | L | GF | GA | GD | Pts | Qualification | QUW | WAH | HID | SAF |
|---|---|---|---|---|---|---|---|---|---|---|---|---|---|---|
| 1 | (Iraq) Al-Quwa Al-Jawiya | 6 | 3 | 3 | 0 | 6 | 2 | +4 | 12 | Zonal semi-finals | — | 1–1 | 2–1 | 2–0 |
| 2 | (Syria) Al-Wahda | 6 | 3 | 2 | 1 | 10 | 3 | +7 | 11 | Zonal semi-finals | 0–0 | — | 0–2 | 2–0 |
| 3 | (Bahrain) Al-Hidd | 6 | 3 | 0 | 3 | 8 | 5 | +3 | 9 | | 0–1 | 0–1 | — | 3–1 |
| 4 | (Lebanon) Safa | 6 | 0 | 1 | 5 | 1 | 15 | −14 | 1 | | 0–0 | 0–6 | 0–2 | — |

Source: AFC
Rules for classification: Group stage tiebreakers
20 February 2017
14:30 UTC+2

| Safa (Lebanon) | 0–0 | (Iraq) Al-Quwa Al-Jawiya |
|---|---|---|
| | Report |

Saida Municipal Stadium, Sidon
Attendance: 300
Referee: Ahmad Yacoub Ibrahim (Jordan)
20 February 2017
18:15 UTC+3

| Al-Hidd (Bahrain) | 0–1 | (Syria) Al-Wahda |
|---|---|---|
| | Report | Omari 40' |

Bahrain National Stadium, Riffa
Attendance: 295
Referee: Sultan Al-Marzooqi (United Arab Emirates)

6 March 2017
14:30 UTC+2

| Al-Wahda (Syria) | 2–0 | (Lebanon) Safa |
|---|---|---|
| Fares 28'; Rafe 66' | Report |

Saida Municipal Stadium, Sidon (Lebanon)
Attendance: 31
Referee: Mahmood Al-Majarafi (Oman)
6 March 2017
18:00 UTC+3

| Al-Quwa Al-Jawiya (Iraq) | 2–1 | (Bahrain) Al-Hidd |
|---|---|---|
| Ahmad 62'; Mohsin 70' | Report | Agba 76' |

Saoud bin Abdulrahman Stadium, Al Wakrah (Qatar)
Attendance: 50
Referee: Payam Heidari (Iran)

14 March 2017
14:30 UTC+2

| Al-Wahda (Syria) | 0–0 | (Iraq) Al-Quwa Al-Jawiya |
|---|---|---|
| | Report |

Saida Municipal Stadium, Sidon (Lebanon)
Attendance: 10
Referee: Aziz Asimov (Uzbekistan)
14 March 2017
18:30 UTC+3

| Al-Hidd (Bahrain) | 3–1 | (Lebanon) Safa |
|---|---|---|
| Olusegun 11', 62'; Agba 32' | Report | Eshabi 33' |

Bahrain National Stadium, Riffa
Attendance: 175
Referee: Khurram Shahzad (Pakistan)

3 April 2017
15:15 UTC+3

| Safa (Lebanon) | 0–2 | (Bahrain) Al-Hidd |
|---|---|---|
| | Report | Adnan 7', 80' |

Saida Municipal Stadium, Sidon
Attendance: 50
Referee: Sherzod Kasimov (Uzbekistan)
3 April 2017
18:00 UTC+3

| Al-Quwa Al-Jawiya (Iraq) | 1–1 | (Syria) Al-Wahda |
|---|---|---|
| Kadhim 88' | Report | Mobayed 23' |

Saoud bin Abdulrahman Stadium, Al Wakrah (Qatar)
Attendance: 80
Referee: Mohammed Al-Hoish (Saudi Arabia)

18 April 2017
15:15 UTC+3

| Al-Wahda (Syria) | 0–2 | (Bahrain) Al-Hidd |
|---|---|---|
| | Report | Al-Dawud 59', 77' |

Saida Municipal Stadium, Sidon (Lebanon)
Attendance: 23
Referee: Timur Faizullin (Kyrgyzstan)
18 April 2017
18:00 UTC+3

| Al-Quwa Al-Jawiya (Iraq) | 2–0 | (Lebanon) Safa |
|---|---|---|
| Al Saadi 29' (o.g.); Radhi 38' (pen.) | Report |

Saoud bin Abdulrahman Stadium, Al Wakrah (Qatar)
Attendance: 150
Referee: Kim Woo-sung (South Korea)

2 May 2017
15:15 UTC+3

| Safa (Lebanon) | 0–6 | (Syria) Al-Wahda |
|---|---|---|
| | Report | Al Haj 43'; Fares 45+3'; Al Hasan 48'; Omari 84'; Shalha 89'; Habib 90+3' |

Camille Chamoun Sports City Stadium, Beirut
Attendance: 40
Referee: Bijan Heidari (Iran)
2 May 2017
18:00 UTC+3

| Al-Hidd (Bahrain) | 0–1 | (Iraq) Al-Quwa Al-Jawiya |
|---|---|---|
| | Report | Radhi 71' |

Bahrain National Stadium, Riffa
Attendance: 50
Referee: Ahmed Al-Ali (Jordan)

=== Group C ===
| Pos | Team | Pld | W | D | L | GF | GA | GD | Pts | Qualification | WEH | MUH | SAH | NEJ |
|---|---|---|---|---|---|---|---|---|---|---|---|---|---|---|
| 1 | (Jordan) Al-Wehdat | 6 | 3 | 3 | 0 | 9 | 6 | +3 | 12 | Zonal semi-finals | — | 3–2 | 2–1 | 1–0 |
| 2 | (Bahrain) Al-Muharraq | 6 | 3 | 1 | 2 | 9 | 8 | +1 | 10 | | 1–1 | — | 1–0 | 1–0 |
| 3 | (Oman) Saham | 6 | 2 | 1 | 3 | 9 | 9 | 0 | 7 | | 1–1 | 3–2 | — | 3–1 |
| 4 | (Lebanon) Nejmeh | 6 | 1 | 1 | 4 | 5 | 9 | −4 | 4 | | 1–1 | 1–2 | 2–1 | — |

Source: AFC
Rules for classification: Group stage tiebreakers
21 February 2017
19:00 UTC+4

| Saham (Oman) | 3–2 | (Bahrain) Al-Muharraq |
|---|---|---|
| Al-Jabri 33'; Al-Khaldi 45'; Al-Ghassani 88' | Report | Nelson 11'; Yaser 51' (pen.) |

Al-Seeb Stadium, Seeb
Attendance: 1,400
Referee: Mohammed Al-Hoish (Saudi Arabia)
21 February 2017
18:00 UTC+2

| Al-Wehdat (Jordan) | 1–0 | (Lebanon) Nejmeh |
|---|---|---|
| Abu Amarah 63' | Report |

King Abdullah II Stadium, Amman
Attendance: 10,000
Referee: Saoud Al-Athbah (Qatar)

7 March 2017
14:30 UTC+2

| Nejmeh (Lebanon) | 2–1 | (Oman) Saham |
|---|---|---|
| Moghrabi 45'; Cofie 70' | Report | Al-Ghassani 47' |

Saida Municipal Stadium, Sidon
Attendance: 2,700
Referee: Nivon Robesh Gamini (Sri Lanka)
7 March 2017
18:30 UTC+3

| Al-Muharraq (Bahrain) | 1–1 | (Jordan) Al-Wehdat |
|---|---|---|
| Abdullatif 8' | Report | Abu Amarah 29' (pen.) |

Bahrain National Stadium, Riffa
Attendance: 1,500
Referee: Nagor Amir Noor Mohamed (Malaysia)

13 March 2017
14:30 UTC+2

| Nejmeh (Lebanon) | 1–2 | (Bahrain) Al-Muharraq |
|---|---|---|
| Takaji 65' (pen.) | Report | Fuakumputu 16', 47' |

Saida Municipal Stadium, Sidon
Attendance: 2,100
Referee: Yudai Yamamoto (Japan)
13 March 2017
18:00 UTC+2

| Al-Wehdat (Jordan) | 2–1 | (Oman) Saham |
|---|---|---|
| Wridat 27'; Mustafa 49' | Report | Al-Ghassani 13' |

King Abdullah II Stadium, Amman
Attendance: 4,000
Referee: Hanna Hattab (Syria)

4 April 2017
19:00 UTC+4

| Saham (Oman) | 1–1 | (Jordan) Al-Wehdat |
|---|---|---|
| Jildemar 28' | Report | Faisal 84' |

Sultan Qaboos Sports Complex, Muscat
Attendance: 1,200
Referee: Takuto Okabe (Japan)
4 April 2017
18:45 UTC+3

| Al-Muharraq (Bahrain) | 1–0 | (Lebanon) Nejmeh |
|---|---|---|
| Rashid 90+3' | Report |

Bahrain National Stadium, Riffa
Attendance: 300
Referee: Saoud Al-Athbah (Qatar)

17 April 2017
15:15 UTC+3

| Nejmeh (Lebanon) | 1–1 | (Jordan) Al-Wehdat |
|---|---|---|
| Al-Hussain 88' | Report | Wasswa 84' (o.g.) |

Saida Municipal Stadium, Sidon
Attendance: 2,800
Referee: Ali Sabah (Iraq)
17 April 2017
18:45 UTC+3

| Al-Muharraq (Bahrain) | 1–0 | (Oman) Saham |
|---|---|---|
| Fuakumputu 37' | Report |

Bahrain National Stadium, Riffa
Attendance: 400
Referee: Kim Dae-yong (South Korea)

1 May 2017
18:00 UTC+3

| Al-Wehdat (Jordan) | 3–2 | (Bahrain) Al-Muharraq |
|---|---|---|
| Antić 1'; Abu Amarah 45+1'; Faisal 60' | Report | Fuakumputu 49'; Jamal 75' |

King Abdullah II Stadium, Amman
Attendance: 3,800
Referee: Khurram Shahzad (Pakistan)
1 May 2017
19:00 UTC+4

| Saham (Oman) | 3–1 | (Lebanon) Nejmeh |
|---|---|---|
| Al-Ghassani 36', 74', 87' | Report | Cofie 13' |

Sultan Qaboos Sports Complex, Muscat
Attendance: 180
Referee: Nagor Amir Noor Mohamed (Malaysia)

=== Group D ===
| Pos | Team | Pld | W | D | L | GF | GA | GD | Pts | Qualification | IST | ALT | DOR | ALA |
|---|---|---|---|---|---|---|---|---|---|---|---|---|---|---|
| 1 | (Tajikistan) Istiklol | 6 | 5 | 1 | 0 | 15 | 4 | +11 | 16 | Inter-zone play-off semi-finals | — | 1–0 | 2–0 | 3–1 |
| 2 | (Turkmenistan) Altyn Asyr | 6 | 4 | 1 | 1 | 12 | 4 | +8 | 13 | | 1–1 | — | 3–0 | 4–1 |
| 3 | (Kyrgyzstan) Dordoi | 6 | 1 | 0 | 5 | 6 | 16 | −10 | 3 (Note: Head-to-head results: Dordoi 1–0 Alay Osh, Alay Osh 5–4 Dordoi (Dordoi won on away goals).) | | 1–4 | 0–2 | — | 1–0 |
| 4 | (Kyrgyzstan) Alay Osh | 6 | 1 | 0 | 5 | 9 | 18 | −9 | 3 | | 1–4 | 1–2 | 5–4 | — |

Source: AFC
Rules for classification: Group stage tiebreakers
Notes:
14 March 2017
14:00 UTC+6

| Alay Osh (Kyrgyzstan) | 1–2 | (Turkmenistan) Altyn Asyr |
|---|---|---|
| Umarov 55' | Report | Annadurdyýew 43'; Umarov 45+2' (o.g.) |

Suyumbayev Stadion, Osh
Attendance: 5,000
Referee: Mohammad Arafah (Jordan)
14 March 2017
18:30 UTC+5

| Istiklol (Tajikistan) | 2–0 | (Kyrgyzstan) Dordoi |
|---|---|---|
| Mawutor 16'; Aliev 22' | Report |

Pamir Stadium, Dushanbe
Attendance: 16,500
Referee: Yaqoub Al-Hammadi (United Arab Emirates)

4 April 2017
16:00 UTC+6

| Dordoi (Kyrgyzstan) | 1–0 | (Kyrgyzstan) Alay Osh |
|---|---|---|
| Azizov 87' | Report |

Dolen Omurzakov Stadium, Bishkek
Attendance: 2,000
Referee: Hanna Hattab (Syria)
4 April 2017
17:00 UTC+5

| Altyn Asyr (Turkmenistan) | 1–1 | (Tajikistan) Istiklol |
|---|---|---|
| Annadurdyýew 49' | Report | Aliev 31' |

Sport Toplumy Stadium, Balkanabat
Attendance: 8,500
Referee: Jameel Abdulhusin (Bahrain)

18 April 2017
19:00 UTC+6

| Dordoi (Kyrgyzstan) | 0–2 | (Turkmenistan) Altyn Asyr |
|---|---|---|
| | Report | Ýagşyýew 43'; Annadurdyýew 85' |

Dolen Omurzakov Stadium, Bishkek
Attendance: 3,000
Referee: Hasan Akrami (Iran)
18 April 2017
19:00 UTC+5

| Istiklol (Tajikistan) | 3–1 | (Kyrgyzstan) Alay Osh |
|---|---|---|
| Davronov 45+1' (pen.); Mawutor 68'; Vasiev 89' | Report | Sylla 59' |

Pamir Stadium, Dushanbe
Attendance: 14,500
Referee: Hiroyuki Kimura (Japan)

3 May 2017
16:00 UTC+6

| Alay Osh (Kyrgyzstan) | 1–4 | (Tajikistan) Istiklol |
|---|---|---|
| Abdurakhmanov 89' | Report | Dzhalilov 33', 39'; Vasiev 79' (pen.), 82' |

Suyumbayev Stadion, Osh
Attendance: 3,000
Referee: Jansen Foo (Singapore)
3 May 2017
17:00 UTC+5

| Altyn Asyr (Turkmenistan) | 3–0 | (Kyrgyzstan) Dordoi |
|---|---|---|
| Annadurdyýew 14'; Amanow 17' (pen.), 34' (pen.) | Report |

Sport Toplumy Stadium, Balkanabat
Attendance: 8,200
Referee: Khamis Al-Kuwari (Qatar)

17 May 2017
17:00 UTC+5

| Altyn Asyr (Turkmenistan) | 4–1 | (Kyrgyzstan) Alay Osh |
|---|---|---|
| Ýagşyýew 32', 42', 82', 85' | Report | Akhmedov 53' |

Sport Toplumy Stadium, Balkanabat
Attendance: 8,285
Referee: Pranjal Banerjee (India)
17 May 2017
19:00 UTC+6

| Dordoi (Kyrgyzstan) | 1–4 | (Tajikistan) Istiklol |
|---|---|---|
| Soulemana 50' | Report | Dzhalilov 8', 46', 75'; Potapov 90+3' (o.g.) |

Dolen Omurzakov Stadium, Bishkek
Attendance: 1,000
Referee: Ng Chiu Kok (Hong Kong)

31 May 2017
16:00 UTC+6

| Alay Osh (Kyrgyzstan) | 5–4 | (Kyrgyzstan) Dordoi |
|---|---|---|
| Tukhtasinov 30'; Akhmedov 61'; Sidibé 73', 88'; Alimov 90+3' | Report | Shamshiev 11'; Azizov 26'; Zhyrgalbek Uulu 75', 81' |

Suyumbayev Stadion, Osh
Attendance: 1,500
Referee: Khurram Shahzad (Pakistan)
31 May 2017
20:00 UTC+5

| Istiklol (Tajikistan) | 1–0 | (Turkmenistan) Altyn Asyr |
|---|---|---|
| Vasiev 90+2' | Report |

Pamir Stadium, Dushanbe
Attendance: 9,000
Referee: Yaqoob Abdul Baki (Oman)

=== Group E ===
| Pos | Team | Pld | W | D | L | GF | GA | GD | Pts | Qualification | BFC | MAZ | MOH | ABD |
|---|---|---|---|---|---|---|---|---|---|---|---|---|---|---|
| 1 | (India) Bengaluru | 6 | 4 | 0 | 2 | 7 | 6 | +1 | 12 (Note: Head-to-head results: Maziya 0–1 Bengaluru, Bengaluru 1–0 Maziya.) | Inter-zone play-off semi-finals | — | 1–0 | 2–1 | 2–0 |
| 2 | (Maldives) Maziya | 6 | 4 | 0 | 2 | 10 | 4 | +6 | 12 | | 0–1 | — | 5–2 | 2–0 |
| 3 | (India) Mohun Bagan | 6 | 2 | 1 | 3 | 10 | 11 | −1 | 7 | | 3–1 | 0–1 | — | 3–1 |
| 4 | (Bangladesh) Abahani Limited Dhaka | 6 | 1 | 1 | 4 | 4 | 10 | −6 | 4 | | 2–0 | 0–2 | 1–1 | — |

Source: AFC
Rules for classification: Group stage tiebreakers
Notes:
14 March 2017
18:10 UTC+6

| Abahani Limited Dhaka (Bangladesh) | 0–2 | (Maldives) Maziya |
|---|---|---|
| | Report | Umair 5'; Abdulla 88' |

Bangabandhu National Stadium, Dhaka
Attendance: 800
Referee: Bijan Heidari (Iran)
14 March 2017
19:00 UTC+5:30

| Bengaluru (India) | 2–1 | (India) Mohun Bagan |
|---|---|---|
| Jhingan 51'; Chhetri 57' | Report | Yusa 36' (pen.) |

Sree Kanteerava Stadium, Bangalore
Attendance: 3,692
Referee: Shukri Al-Hunfush (Saudi Arabia)

4 April 2017
16:00 UTC+5

| Maziya (Maldives) | 0–1 | (India) Bengaluru |
|---|---|---|
| | Report | Johnson 90+3' |

National Football Stadium, Malé
Attendance: 846
Referee: Sultan Al-Marzooqi (United Arab Emirates)
4 April 2017
19:00 UTC+5:30

| Mohun Bagan (India) | 3–1 | (Bangladesh) Abahani Limited Dhaka |
|---|---|---|
| Lalpekhlua 45+1'; Ba. Singh 48'; Norde 87' | Report | Brown 21' |

Rabindra Sarobar Stadium, Kolkata
Attendance: 2,128
Referee: Mohammad Abu Loum (Jordan)

18 April 2017
19:00 UTC+5:30

| Bengaluru (India) | 2–0 | (Bangladesh) Abahani Limited Dhaka |
|---|---|---|
| Kumar 40'; Jugović 83' | Report |

Sree Kanteerava Stadium, Bangalore
Attendance: 2,012
Referee: Sherzod Kasimov (Uzbekistan)
19 April 2017
19:00 UTC+5:30

| Mohun Bagan (India) | 0–1 | (Maldives) Maziya |
|---|---|---|
| | Report | Umair 34' |

Rabindra Sarobar Stadium, Kolkata
Attendance: 1,842
Referee: Võ Minh Trí (Vietnam)

3 May 2017
16:00 UTC+5

| Maziya (Maldives) | 5–2 | (India) Mohun Bagan |
|---|---|---|
| Habeeb 13'; Umair 27'; Rakić 45', 60'; Abdulla 55' (pen.) | Report | Debnath 48'; Lalpekhlua 78' (pen.) |

National Football Stadium, Malé
Attendance: 200
Referee: Dmitry Mashentsev (Kyrgyzstan)
3 May 2017
18:10 UTC+6

| Abahani Limited Dhaka (Bangladesh) | 2–0 | (India) Bengaluru |
|---|---|---|
| Uddin 87'; Miya 90+3' | Report |

Bangabandhu National Stadium, Dhaka
Attendance: 3,200
Referee: Hussein Abo Yehia (Lebanon)

17 May 2017
16:00 UTC+5

| Maziya (Maldives) | 2–0 | (Bangladesh) Abahani Limited Dhaka |
|---|---|---|
| Umair 59'; Rakić 85' | Report |

National Football Stadium, Malé
Attendance: 1,349
Referee: Ahmad Yacoub Ibrahim (Jordan)
17 May 2017
19:00 UTC+5:30

| Mohun Bagan (India) | 3–1 | (India) Bengaluru |
|---|---|---|
| Lalpekhlua 9'; Lewis 74'; Bi. Singh 80' | Report | Doungel 52' |

Rabindra Sarobar Stadium, Kolkata
Attendance: 1,298
Referee: Ammar Mahfoodh (Bahrain)

31 May 2017
19:15 UTC+5:30

| Bengaluru (India) | 1–0 | (Maldives) Maziya |
|---|---|---|
| Chhetri 57' | Report |

Sree Kanteerava Stadium, Bangalore
Attendance: 3,173
Referee: Lau Fong Hei (Hong Kong)
31 May 2017
19:45 UTC+6

| Abahani Limited Dhaka (Bangladesh) | 1–1 | (India) Mohun Bagan |
|---|---|---|
| Onuoha 8' | Report | Yusa 83' (pen.) |

Bangabandhu National Stadium, Dhaka
Attendance: 800
Referee: Sukhbir Singh (Singapore)

=== Group F ===
| Pos | Team | Pld | W | D | L | GF | GA | GD | Pts | Qualification | GLO | JDT | BKA | MAG |
|---|---|---|---|---|---|---|---|---|---|---|---|---|---|---|
| 1 | (Philippines) Global Cebu | 6 | 5 | 0 | 1 | 13 | 9 | +4 | 15 | Zonal semi-finals | — | 3–2 | 3–1 | 1−0 |
| 2 | (Malaysia) Johor Darul Ta'zim | 6 | 4 | 1 | 1 | 16 | 5 | +11 | 13 | Zonal semi-finals | 4–0 | — | 3–0 | 3–1 |
| 3 | (Cambodia) Boeung Ket Angkor | 6 | 1 | 1 | 4 | 3 | 12 | −9 | 4 | | 0–2 | 0–3 | — | 1–0 |
| 4 | (Myanmar) Magwe | 6 | 0 | 2 | 4 | 5 | 11 | −6 | 2 | | 2–4 | 1–1 | 1–1 | — |

Source: AFC
Rules for classification: Group stage tiebreakers
21 February 2017
19:30 UTC+8

| Global Cebu (Philippines) | 1–0 | (Myanmar) Magwe |
|---|---|---|
| Bahadoran 39' | Report |

Rizal Memorial Stadium, Manila
Attendance: 456
Referee: Kim Hee-gon (South Korea)
21 February 2017
20:45 UTC+8

| Johor Darul Ta'zim (Malaysia) | 3–0 | (Cambodia) Boeung Ket Angkor |
|---|---|---|
| Guerra 3'; Nazmi 11'; Safiq 89' | Report |

Larkin Stadium, Johor Bahru
Attendance: 9,850
Referee: Hasan Akrami (Iran)

7 March 2017
15:30 UTC+6:30

| Magwe (Myanmar) | 1–1 | (Malaysia) Johor Darul Ta'zim |
|---|---|---|
| Sylla 89' | Report | Gopinathan 28' |

Thuwunna Stadium, Yangon
Attendance: 350
Referee: Hussein Abo Yehia (Lebanon)
7 March 2017
18:00 UTC+7

| Boeung Ket Angkor (Cambodia) | 0–2 | (Philippines) Global Cebu |
|---|---|---|
| | Report | Mulders 5', 65' (pen.) |

Olympic Stadium, Phnom Penh
Attendance: 3,000
Referee: Yu Ming-hsun (Chinese Taipei)

14 March 2017
18:00 UTC+7

| Boeung Ket Angkor (Cambodia) | 1–0 | (Myanmar) Magwe |
|---|---|---|
| Oulai 34' (o.g.) | Report |

Olympic Stadium, Phnom Penh
Attendance: 975
Referee: Masoud Tufayelieh (Syria)
14 March 2017
20:45 UTC+8

| Johor Darul Ta'zim (Malaysia) | 4–0 | (Philippines) Global Cebu |
|---|---|---|
| Mahali 30'; Safiq 34' (pen.); Ferreira 87'; Marcos António 90+2' | Report |

Larkin Stadium, Johor Bahru
Attendance: 11,090
Referee: Kim Dae-yong (South Korea)

5 April 2017
15:30 UTC+6:30

| Magwe (Myanmar) | 1–1 | (Cambodia) Boeung Ket Angkor |
|---|---|---|
| Sylla 62' | Report | Laboravy 61' |

Thuwunna Stadium, Yangon
Attendance: 155
Referee: Sukhbir Singh (Singapore)
5 April 2017
19:30 UTC+8

| Global Cebu (Philippines) | 3–2 | (Malaysia) Johor Darul Ta'zim |
|---|---|---|
| Villanueva 27'; Sasaki 32'; Aguinaldo 35' | Report | Guerra 49', 83' |

Rizal Memorial Stadium, Manila
Attendance: 458
Referee: Khamis Al-Kuwari (Qatar)

19 April 2017
15:30 UTC+6:30

| Magwe (Myanmar) | 2–4 | (Philippines) Global Cebu |
|---|---|---|
| Naing Naing Kyaw 38'; Naing Lin Tun 90+3' | Report | Minegishi 72'; Roberts 82', 83'; Sasaki 89' |

Thuwunna Stadium, Yangon
Attendance: 150
Referee: Mahmood Al-Majarafi (Oman)
19 April 2017
18:00 UTC+7

| Boeung Ket Angkor (Cambodia) | 0–3 | (Malaysia) Johor Darul Ta'zim |
|---|---|---|
| | Report | Safawi 8'; Nazmi 26'; Guerra 90+2' |

Olympic Stadium, Phnom Penh
Attendance: 1,277
Referee: Ammar Mahfoodh (Bahrain)

3 May 2017
20:35 UTC+8

| Johor Darul Ta'zim (Malaysia) | 3–1 | (Myanmar) Magwe |
|---|---|---|
| Guerra 16', 59', 79' (pen.) | Report | Kyaw Swar Linn 3' |

Larkin Stadium, Johor Bahru
Attendance: 10,190
Referee: Yudai Yamamoto (Japan)
3 May 2017
20:35 UTC+8

| Global Cebu (Philippines) | 3–1 | (Cambodia) Boeung Ket Angkor |
|---|---|---|
| Mulders 12'; Minegishi 28'; Roberts 90+3' | Report | Rosib 50' |

Rizal Memorial Stadium, Manila
Attendance: 310
Referee: Mohammad Arafah (Jordan)

=== Group G ===
| Pos | Team | Pld | W | D | L | GF | GA | GD | Pts | Qualification | CER | HAN | TAM | FEL |
|---|---|---|---|---|---|---|---|---|---|---|---|---|---|---|
| 1 | (Philippines) Ceres–Negros | 6 | 3 | 2 | 1 | 16 | 8 | +8 | 11 (Note: Head-to-head results: Hà Nội 1–1 Ceres–Negros, Ceres–Negros 6–2 Hà Nội.) | Zonal semi-finals | — | 6–2 | 5–0 | 0–0 |
| 2 | (Vietnam) Hà Nội | 6 | 3 | 2 | 1 | 14 | 10 | +4 | 11 | | 1–1 | — | 4–0 | 4–1 |
| 3 | (Singapore) Tampines Rovers | 6 | 2 | 0 | 4 | 8 | 17 | −9 | 6 | | 2–4 | 1–2 | — | 2–1 |
| 4 | (Malaysia) FELDA United | 6 | 1 | 2 | 3 | 7 | 10 | −3 | 5 | | 3–0 | 1–1 | 1–3 | — |

Source: AFC
Rules for classification: Group stage tiebreakers
Notes:
21 February 2017
18:00 UTC+7

| Hà Nội (Vietnam) | 1–1 | (Philippines) Ceres–Negros |
|---|---|---|
| Nguyễn Văn Quyết 57' | Report | Marañón 49' |

Mỹ Đình National Stadium, Hanoi
Attendance: 2,600
Referee: Yaqoub Al-Hammadi (United Arab Emirates)
21 February 2017
19:30 UTC+8

| Tampines Rovers (Singapore) | 2–1 | (Malaysia) FELDA United |
|---|---|---|
| Son Yong-chan 64'; Khairul 83' | Report | Fazrul 86' |

Jalan Besar Stadium, Singapore
Attendance: 1,277
Referee: Takuto Okabe (Japan)

7 March 2017
16:45 UTC+8

| FELDA United (Malaysia) | 1–1 | (Vietnam) Hà Nội |
|---|---|---|
| Krangar 23' | Report | Đỗ Hùng Dũng 90+1' |

Shah Alam Stadium, Shah Alam
Attendance: 200
Referee: Ahmed Al-Ali (Jordan)
7 March 2017
19:30 UTC+8

| Ceres–Negros (Philippines) | 5–0 | (Singapore) Tampines Rovers |
|---|---|---|
| Ramsay 1'; Marañón 24', 64'; Ott 38'; Rodríguez 72' | Report |

Panaad Park and Stadium, Bacolod
Attendance: 8,000
Referee: Kim Woo-sung (South Korea)

15 March 2017
18:00 UTC+7

| Hà Nội (Vietnam) | 4–0 | (Singapore) Tampines Rovers |
|---|---|---|
| Arnaud 16'; Nguyễn Văn Quyết 65'; Đỗ Hùng Dũng 89'; Marronkle 90+3' (pen.) | Report |

Mỹ Đình National Stadium, Hanoi
Attendance: 2,600
Referee: Mooud Bonyadifar (Iran)
15 March 2017
19:30 UTC+8

| Ceres–Negros (Philippines) | 0–0 | (Malaysia) FELDA United |
|---|---|---|
| | Report |

Panaad Park and Stadium, Bacolod
Attendance: 8,965
Referee: Wang Di (China)

4 April 2017
16:45 UTC+8

| FELDA United (Malaysia) | 3–0 | (Philippines) Ceres–Negros |
|---|---|---|
| Syahid 5'; Hadin 66'; Fazrul 77' | Report |

Shah Alam Stadium, Shah Alam
Attendance: 250
Referee: Shukri Al-Hunfush (Saudi Arabia)
4 April 2017
19:30 UTC+8

| Tampines Rovers (Singapore) | 1–2 | (Vietnam) Hà Nội |
|---|---|---|
| Yasir 68' | Report | Nguyễn Văn Quyết 75'; Phạm Văn Thành 90+2' |

Jalan Besar Stadium, Singapore
Attendance: 1,565
Referee: Mohammad Arafah (Jordan)

19 April 2017
19:30 UTC+8

| Ceres–Negros (Philippines) | 6–2 | (Vietnam) Hà Nội |
|---|---|---|
| Marañón 13' (pen.), 90'; Ingreso 21'; Rodríguez 53'; Silva 69' (o.g.); De Jong 89' | Report | Phạm Thành Lương 25'; Đỗ Hùng Dũng 86' (pen.) |

Panaad Park and Stadium, Bacolod
Attendance: 8,366
Referee: Jameel Abdulhusin (Bahrain)
19 April 2017
20:45 UTC+8

| FELDA United (Malaysia) | 1–3 | (Singapore) Tampines Rovers |
|---|---|---|
| Norshahrul 51' | Report | Džoni 29'; Khairul 68', 72' |

Tun Abdul Razak Stadium, Jengka
Attendance: 2,252
Referee: Lau Fong Hei (Hong Kong)

3 May 2017
18:30 UTC+7

| Hà Nội (Vietnam) | 4–1 | (Malaysia) FELDA United |
|---|---|---|
| Phạm Đức Huy 52'; Nguyễn Văn Quyết 76', 86'; Đỗ Hùng Dũng 90' | Report | Cellerino 90+3' (pen.) |

Mỹ Đình National Stadium, Hanoi
Attendance: 1,800
Referee: Yaqoob Abdul Baki (Oman)
3 May 2017
19:30 UTC+8

| Tampines Rovers (Singapore) | 2–4 | (Philippines) Ceres–Negros |
|---|---|---|
| Yasir 24', 60' (pen.) | Report | Marañón 6', 22'; Rodríguez 44' (pen.); Kawase 65' |

Jalan Besar Stadium, Singapore
Attendance: 856
Referee: Masoud Tufayelieh (Syria)

=== Group H ===
| Pos | Team | Pld | W | D | L | GF | GA | GD | Pts | Qualification | HOM | TQN | YAD |
|---|---|---|---|---|---|---|---|---|---|---|---|---|---|
| 1 | (Singapore) Home United | 4 | 3 | 0 | 1 | 12 | 8 | +4 | 9 | Zonal semi-finals | — | 3–2 | 4–1 |
| 2 | (Vietnam) Than Quảng Ninh | 4 | 1 | 1 | 2 | 10 | 9 | +1 | 4 (Note: Head-to-head results: Than Quảng Ninh 1–1 Yadanarbon, Yadanarbon 0–3 Than Quảng Ninh.) | | 4–5 | — | 1–1 |
| 3 | (Myanmar) Yadanarbon | 4 | 1 | 1 | 2 | 3 | 8 | −5 | 4 | | 1–0 | 0–3 | — |

Source: AFC
Rules for classification: Group stage tiebreakers
Notes:
22 February 2017
17:00 UTC+6:30

| Yadanarbon (Myanmar) | 1–0 | (Singapore) Home United |
|---|---|---|
| Aung Thu 45+2' | Report |

Mandalar Thiri Stadium, Mandalay
Attendance: 2,100
Referee: Muhammad Nazmi Nasaruddin (Malaysia)

8 March 2017
18:00 UTC+7

| Than Quảng Ninh (Vietnam) | 1–1 | (Myanmar) Yadanarbon |
|---|---|---|
| Vũ Minh Tuấn 45' (pen.) | Report | Yan Paing 22' |

Mỹ Đình National Stadium, Hanoi
Attendance: 2,579
Referee: Rowan Arumughan (India)

14 March 2017
19:30 UTC+8

| Home United (Singapore) | 3–2 | (Vietnam) Than Quảng Ninh |
|---|---|---|
| Song Ui-young 3', 84'; Faris 58' | Report | Tambwe 32'; Vũ Minh Tuấn 40' |

Jalan Besar Stadium, Singapore
Attendance: 1,971
Referee: Omar Al-Yaqoubi (Oman)

5 April 2017
18:00 UTC+7

| Than Quảng Ninh (Vietnam) | 4–5 | (Singapore) Home United |
|---|---|---|
| Juma'at 36' (o.g.); Bùi Văn Hiếu 44'; Vũ Minh Tuấn 78'; Nghiêm Xuân Tú 90+2' | Report | Nizam 11'; Plazibat 15' (pen.), 64', 69', 86' |

Mỹ Đình National Stadium, Hanoi
Attendance: 2,860
Referee: Muhammad Nazmi Nasaruddin (Malaysia)

18 April 2017
19:30 UTC+8

| Home United (Singapore) | 4–1 | (Myanmar) Yadanarbon |
|---|---|---|
| Afiq 12'; Faris 16' (pen.); Irfan 26'; Adam 72' | Report | Sithu Aung 45+3' |

Jalan Besar Stadium, Singapore
Attendance: 1,535
Referee: Mooud Bonyadifar (Iran)

2 May 2017
17:00 UTC+6:30

| Yadanarbon (Myanmar) | 0–3 | (Vietnam) Than Quảng Ninh |
|---|---|---|
| | Report | Nay Myo Aung 38' (o.g.); Dương Văn Khoa 56'; Nguyễn Hải Huy 74' |

Mandalar Thiri Stadium, Mandalay
Attendance: 1,500
Referee: Ahmad Yacoub Ibrahim (Jordan)

=== Group I ===
| Pos | Team | Pld | W | D | L | GF | GA | GD | Pts | Qualification | APR | KIG | ERC |
|---|---|---|---|---|---|---|---|---|---|---|---|---|---|
| 1 | (North Korea) April 25 | 4 | 2 | 2 | 0 | 14 | 3 | +11 | 8 (Note: Head-to-head results: April 25 1–1 Kigwancha, Kigwancha 2–2 April 25 (April 25 won on away goals).) | Inter-zone play-off semi-finals | — | 1–1 | 6–0 |
| 2 | (North Korea) Kigwancha | 4 | 2 | 2 | 0 | 13 | 3 | +10 | 8 | | 2–2 | — | 7–0 |
| 3 | (Mongolia) Erchim | 4 | 0 | 0 | 4 | 0 | 21 | −21 | 0 | | 0–5 | 0–3 | — |

Source: AFC
Rules for classification: Group stage tiebreakers
Notes:
14 March 2017
16:00 UTC+8:30

| April 25 (North Korea) | 6–0 | (Mongolia) Erchim |
|---|---|---|
| Kim Yu-song 12', 22', 24', 31', 59'; Om Chol-song 77' | Report |

Rungrado 1st of May Stadium, Pyongyang
Attendance: 8,000
Referee: Sivakorn Pu-udom (Thailand)

4 April 2017
16:00 UTC+8

| Erchim (Mongolia) | 0–3 | (North Korea) Kigwancha |
|---|---|---|
| | Report | Kim Yong-il 40', 90+3'; Galt 46' (o.g.) |

MFF Football Centre, Ulaanbaatar
Attendance: 2,850
Referee: Rowan Arumughan (India)

18 April 2017
16:00 UTC+8:30

| April 25 (North Korea) | 1–1 | (North Korea) Kigwancha |
|---|---|---|
| Pak Myong-song 45' | Report | Pak Kun-hyok 56' |

Rungrado 1st of May Stadium, Pyongyang
Attendance: 8,700
Referee: Yu Ming-hsun (Chinese Taipei)

3 May 2017
15:00 UTC+8:30

| Kigwancha (North Korea) | 2–2 | (North Korea) April 25 |
|---|---|---|
| Rim Kwang-hyok 35'; Ri Un-il 61' | Report | An Il-bom 70'; Kim Yu-song 90+8' |

Kim Il-sung Stadium, Pyongyang
Attendance: 8,000
Referee: Zhang Lei (China)

17 May 2017
16:00 UTC+8

| Erchim (Mongolia) | 0–5 | (North Korea) April 25 |
|---|---|---|
| | Report | Kim Yu-song 23', 57', 85'; An Il-bom 40'; Ri Hyong-jin 69' (pen.) |

MFF Football Centre, Ulaanbaatar
Attendance: 1,020
Referee: Saoud Al-Athbah (Qatar)

31 May 2017
15:00 UTC+8:30

| Kigwancha (North Korea) | 7–0 | (Mongolia) Erchim |
|---|---|---|
| Rim Kwang-hyok 30', 40', 79' (pen.), 82'; Kang Kuk-chol 60'; Han Thae-hyok 70'; Kim Yong-il 74' | Report |

Kim Il-sung Stadium, Pyongyang
Attendance: 2,500
Referee: Wang Di (China)

== Ranking of second-placed teams ==
=== West Asia Zone ===
| Pos | Grp | Team | Pld | W | D | L | GF | GA | GD | Pts | Qualification |
|---|---|---|---|---|---|---|---|---|---|---|---|
| 1 | B | (Syria) Al-Wahda | 6 | 3 | 2 | 1 | 10 | 3 | +7 | 11 | Zonal semi-finals |
| 2 | C | (Bahrain) Al-Muharraq | 6 | 3 | 1 | 2 | 9 | 8 | +1 | 10 | |
| 3 | A | (Syria) Al-Jaish | 6 | 3 | 0 | 3 | 6 | 9 | −3 | 9 | |

Source: AFC

=== ASEAN Zone ===
| Pos | Grp | Team | Pld | W | D | L | GF | GA | GD | Pts | Qualification |
|---|---|---|---|---|---|---|---|---|---|---|---|
| 1 | F | (Malaysia) Johor Darul Ta'zim | 4 | 3 | 0 | 1 | 12 | 3 | +9 | 9 | Zonal semi-finals |
| 2 | G | (Vietnam) Hà Nội | 4 | 2 | 1 | 1 | 9 | 8 | +1 | 7 | |
| 3 | H | (Vietnam) Than Quảng Ninh | 4 | 1 | 1 | 2 | 10 | 9 | +1 | 4 | |

Source: AFC
Note: Due to Group H having only three teams, the results against the fourth-placed teams in Groups F and G are not considered for this ranking.
