= 2017 AFC Cup knockout stage =

Football competition in Asia

The 2017 AFC Cup knockout stage was played from 16 May to 4 November 2017. A total of 11 teams competed in the knockout stage to decide the champions of the 2017 AFC Cup.

== Qualified teams ==
The following teams advanced from the group stage:

- The winners of each of the three groups and the best runners-up in the West Asia Zone (Groups A–C) and the ASEAN Zone (Groups F–H) advanced to the Zonal semi-finals.
- The winners of each group in the Central Asia Zone (Group D), the South Asia Zone (Group E), and the East Asia Zone (Group I) advanced to the Inter-zone play-off semi-finals.

Key to colours
Teams which enter the Inter-zone play-off semi-finals
Teams which enter the Zonal semi-finals

Zone	Group	Winners	Best Runners-up
West Asia Zone	A	(Iraq) Al-Zawraa	(Syria) Al-Wahda (Group B)
West Asia Zone	B	(Iraq) Al-Quwa Al-Jawiya	(Syria) Al-Wahda (Group B)
West Asia Zone	C	(Jordan) Al-Wehdat	(Syria) Al-Wahda (Group B)
Central Asia Zone	D	(Tajikistan) Istiklol	—
South Asia Zone	E	(India) Bengaluru	—
ASEAN Zone	F	(Philippines) Global Cebu	(Malaysia) Johor Darul Ta'zim (Group F)
ASEAN Zone	G	(Philippines) Ceres–Negros	(Malaysia) Johor Darul Ta'zim (Group F)
ASEAN Zone	H	(Singapore) Home United	(Malaysia) Johor Darul Ta'zim (Group F)
East Asia Zone	I	(North Korea) April 25	—

== Format ==
In the knockout stage, the 11 teams played a single-elimination tournament, with the teams split into the five zones until the Inter-zone play-off semi-finals. Each tie was played on a home-and-away two-legged basis, except the final which was played as a single match. The away goals rule (for two-legged ties), extra time (away goals would not apply in extra time) and penalty shoot-out were used to decide the winner if necessary (Regulations Article 11.3).

== Schedule ==
The schedule of each round was as follows (W: West Asia Zone; A: ASEAN Zone). Matches in the West Asia Zone were played on Mondays and Tuesdays, while matches in the ASEAN Zone and the Inter-zone play-offs were played on Tuesdays and Wednesdays.

Round	First leg	Second leg
Zonal semi-finals	16–17, 22 May 2017 (W, A)	29–31 May 2017 (W, A)
Zonal finals	2 August 2017 (A), 12 September 2017 (W)	9 August 2017 (A), 26 September 2017 (W)
Inter-zone play-off semi-finals	22–23 August 2017	12–13 September 2017
Inter-zone play-off final	27 September 2017	18 October 2017
Final	4 November 2017	

== Bracket ==
The bracket of the knockout stage was determined as follows:

Round	Matchups
Zonal semi-finals	(Matchups and order of legs determined by identity of best runner-up: first team listed host first leg, second team listed host second leg) West Asia Zone: If best runner-up from Group A; WSF1: Winner Group A vs. Winner Group C; WSF2: Runner-up Group A vs. Winner Group B; If best runner-up from Group B; WSF1: Winner Group B vs. Winner Group A; WSF2: Runner-up Group B vs. Winner Group C; If best runner-up from Group C; WSF1: Winner Group C vs. Winner Group B; WSF2: Runner-up Group C vs. Winner Group A; ASEAN Zone: If best runner-up from Group F; ASF1: Winner Group F vs. Winner Group H; ASF2: Runner-up Group F vs. Winner Group G; If best runner-up from Group G; ASF1: Winner Group G vs. Winner Group F; ASF2: Runner-up Group G vs. Winner Group H; If best runner-up from Group H; ASF1: Winner Group H vs. Winner Group G; ASF2: Runner-up Group H vs. Winner Group F
Zonal finals	(Order of legs decided by draw) West Asia Zone: WF: Winner WSF1 vs. Winner WSF2; ASEAN Zone: AF: Winner ASF1 vs. Winner ASF2
Inter-zone play-off semi-finals	(Matchups and order of legs decided by draw, involving Winner Group D, Winner Group E, Winner Group I, and Winner AF): IZSF1; IZSF2
Inter-zone play-off final	(Winner IZSF1 host first leg, Winner IZSF2 host second leg): IZF: Winner IZSF1 vs. Winner IZSF2
Final	(Host team decided by draw): Winner WF vs. Winner IZF

The bracket was decided after the draw for the knockout stage, which was held on 6 June 2017, 15:00 MYT (UTC+8), at the JW Marriott Hotel Kuala Lumpur in Kuala Lumpur, Malaysia.

Zonal semi-finals
(Philippines) Global Cebu	2	2	4
(Singapore) Home United	2	3	5
(Malaysia) Johor Darul Ta'zim	3	1	4
(Philippines) Ceres–Negros (a)	2	2	4
(Syria) Al-Wahda	4	0	4
(Jordan) Al-Wehdat	1	1	2
(Iraq) Al-Quwa Al-Jawiya	1	1	2
(Iraq) Al-Zawraa	1	0	1

Zonal finals
(Singapore) Home United	2	0	2
(Philippines) Ceres–Negros	1	2	3
(Syria) Al-Wahda	2	0	2
(Iraq) Al-Quwa Al-Jawiya (a)	1	1	2

Inter-zone play-off semi-finals
(Tajikistan) Istiklol	4	1	5
(Philippines) Ceres–Negros	0	1	1
(India) Bengaluru	3	0	3
(North Korea) April 25	0	0	0

Inter-zone play-off finals
(Tajikistan) Istiklol	1	2	3
(India) Bengaluru	0	2	2

Final
(Tajikistan) Istiklol	0
(Iraq) Al-Quwa Al-Jawiya	1

== Zonal semi-finals ==
In the Zonal semi-finals, the four qualified teams from the West Asia Zone (Groups A–C) played in two ties, and the four qualified teams from the ASEAN Zone (Groups F–H) played in two ties, with the matchups and order of legs determined by the group stage draw and identity of the best runner-up.

West Asia Zone
Team 1	Agg.	Team 2	1st leg	2nd leg
Al-Quwa Al-Jawiya (Iraq)	2–1	(Iraq) Al-Zawraa	1–1	1–0
Al-Wahda (Syria)	4–2	(Jordan) Al-Wehdat	4–1	0–1

ASEAN Zone
Team 1	Agg.	Team 2	1st leg	2nd leg
Global Cebu (Philippines)	4–5	(Singapore) Home United	2–2	2–3
Johor Darul Ta'zim (Malaysia)	4–4 (a)	(Philippines) Ceres–Negros	3–2	1–2

=== West Asia Zone ===
22 May 2017 (Note: The West Asia Zonal semi-final first leg between Al-Quwa Al-Jawiya and Al-Zawraa was agreed by the AFC to be staged in Iraq following FIFA's approval in May 2017 to allow international matches to be played there, and to allow logistical preparation, was moved from 15 May to 22 May. The second leg was also expected to be played in Iraq, but the home side Al-Zawraa requested that it be played in Qatar. The West Asia Zonal final second leg between Al-Quwa Al-Jawiya and Al-Wahda was also played in Qatar.)
18:00 UTC+3

Al-Quwa Al-Jawiya (Iraq)	1–1	(Iraq) Al-Zawraa
Radhi 74'	Report	Mhawi 67'

Franso Hariri Stadium, Erbil
Attendance: 11,509
Referee: Hiroyuki Kimura (Japan)
29 May 2017
21:30 UTC+3

Al-Zawraa (Iraq)	0–1	(Iraq) Al-Quwa Al-Jawiya
	Report	Mohsin 50'

Grand Hamad Stadium, Doha (Qatar)
Attendance: 75
Referee: Turki Al-Khudhayr (Saudi Arabia)

Al-Quwa Al-Jawiya won 2–1 on aggregate.

16 May 2017
15:30 UTC+3

Al-Wahda (Syria)	4–1	(Jordan) Al-Wehdat
Al Hasan 14'; Al Ghabbash 74' (pen.); Rafe 77', 85'	Report	Abu Amarah 32'

Camille Chamoun Sports City Stadium, Beirut (Lebanon) (Note: Teams from Syria are not allowed to host their home matches in their country due to security concerns.)
Attendance: 20
Referee: Nivon Robesh Gamini (Sri Lanka)
30 May 2017
23:00 UTC+3

Al-Wehdat (Jordan)	1–0	(Syria) Al-Wahda
Deeb 7'	Report

King Abdullah II Stadium, Amman
Attendance: 13,000
Referee: Aziz Asimov (Uzbekistan)

Al-Wahda won 4–2 on aggregate.

=== ASEAN Zone ===
16 May 2017
19:30 UTC+8

Global Cebu (Philippines)	2–2	(Singapore) Home United
Roberts 15'; Aguinaldo 53'	Report	Adam 34'; Plazibat 90+5'

Rizal Memorial Stadium, Manila
Attendance: 486
Referee: Wang Di (China)
30 May 2017
20:30 UTC+8

Home United (Singapore)	3–2	(Philippines) Global Cebu
Song Ui-young 36'; Plazibat 89', 90+4'	Report	Agustien 6' (pen.); Sasaki 49'

Jalan Besar Stadium, Singapore
Attendance: 1,370
Referee: Ammar Al-Jeneibi (United Arab Emirates)

Home United won 5–4 on aggregate.

17 May 2017
20:45 UTC+8

Johor Darul Ta'zim (Malaysia)	3–2	(Philippines) Ceres–Negros
Cabrera 18'; Safiq 45+1'; Hazwan 68'	Report	Rodríguez 21'; Marañón 25'

Larkin Stadium, Johor Bahru
Attendance: 14,220
Referee: Rowan Arumughan (India)
31 May 2017
19:30 UTC+8

Ceres–Negros (Philippines)	2–1	(Malaysia) Johor Darul Ta'zim
Kawase 26'; Rodríguez 90+3' (pen.)	Report	Guerra 65'

Panaad Park and Stadium, Bacolod
Attendance: 5,687
Referee: Fu Ming (China)

4–4 on aggregate. Ceres–Negros won on away goals.

== Zonal finals ==
The draw for the Zonal finals was held on 6 June 2017. In the Zonal finals, the two winners of West Asia Zonal semi-finals played each other, and the two winners of ASEAN Zonal semi-finals played each other, with the order of legs decided by draw. The winner of the West Asia Zonal final advanced to the final, while the winner of the ASEAN Zonal final advanced to the Inter-zone play-off semi-finals.

West Asia Zone
Team 1	Agg.	Team 2	1st leg	2nd leg
Al-Wahda (Syria)	2–2 (a)	(Iraq) Al-Quwa Al-Jawiya	2–1	0–1

ASEAN Zone
Team 1	Agg.	Team 2	1st leg	2nd leg
Home United (Singapore)	2–3	(Philippines) Ceres–Negros	2–1	0–2

=== West Asia Zone ===
12 September 2017
15:30 UTC+3

Al-Wahda (Syria)	2–1	(Iraq) Al-Quwa Al-Jawiya
Bouta 3'; Al Masri 64'	Report	Ahmad 90'

Saida Municipal Stadium, Sidon (Lebanon)
Attendance: 30
Referee: Jumpei Iida (Japan)
26 September 2017
18:00 UTC+3

Al-Quwa Al-Jawiya (Iraq)	1–0	(Syria) Al-Wahda
Radhi 90+4'	Report

Saoud bin Abdulrahman Stadium, Al Wakrah (Qatar)
Attendance: 306
Referee: Chris Beath (Australia)

2–2 on aggregate. Al-Quwa Al-Jawiya won on away goals.

=== ASEAN Zone ===
2 August 2017
19:30 UTC+8

Home United (Singapore)	2–1	(Philippines) Ceres–Negros
Plazibat 11' (pen.); Hariss 83'	Report	Steuble 45+3'

Jalan Besar Stadium, Singapore
Attendance: 3,024
Referee: Hiroyuki Kimura (Japan)
9 August 2017
19:30 UTC+8

Ceres–Negros (Philippines)	2–0	(Singapore) Home United
Porteria 2'; Ott 42'	Report

Panaad Park and Stadium, Bacolod
Attendance: 7,534
Referee: Hettikamkanamge Perera (Sri Lanka)

Ceres–Negros won 3–2 on aggregate.

== Inter-zone play-off semi-finals ==
The draw for the Inter-zone play-off semi-finals was held on 6 June 2017. In the Inter-zone play-off semi-finals, the four zonal winners other than the West Asia Zone played in two ties, i.e., the winner of the Central Asia Zone (Group D), the winner of the South Asia Zone (Group E), the winner of the East Asia Zone (Group I), and the winner of the ASEAN Zonal final (whose identity was not known at the time of the draw), with the matchups and order of legs decided by draw, without any seeding.

Team 1	Agg.	Team 2	1st leg	2nd leg
Istiklol (Tajikistan)	5–1	(Philippines) Ceres–Negros	4–0	1–1
Bengaluru (India)	3–0	(North Korea) April 25	3–0	0–0

22 August 2017
19:00 UTC+5

Istiklol (Tajikistan)	4–0	(Philippines) Ceres–Negros
Nazarov 25' (pen.); Jalilov 45'; Dzhalilov 67', 88'	Report

Hisor Central Stadium, Hisor
Attendance: 13,800
Referee: Nivon Robesh Gamini (Sri Lanka)
12 September 2017
19:30 UTC+8

Ceres–Negros (Philippines)	1–1	(Tajikistan) Istiklol
Súper 34'	Report	Barkov 45+1'

Panaad Park and Stadium, Bacolod
Attendance: 4,752
Referee: Ko Hyung-jin (South Korea)

Istiklol won 5–1 on aggregate.

23 August 2017
19:00 UTC+5:30

Bengaluru (India)	3–0	(North Korea) April 25
Chhetri 33' (pen.); U. Singh 51'; Rodrigues 77'	Report

Sree Kanteerava Stadium, Bangalore
Attendance: 4,709
Referee: Turki Al-Khudhayr (Saudi Arabia)
13 September 2017
17:00 UTC+8:30

April 25 (North Korea)	0–0	(India) Bengaluru
	Report

Rungrado 1st of May Stadium, Pyongyang
Attendance: 6,500
Referee: Wang Di (China)

Bengaluru won 3–0 on aggregate.

== Inter-zone play-off final ==
In the Inter-zone play-off final, the two winners of the Inter-zone play-off semi-finals played each other, with the order of legs determined by the Inter-zone play-off semi-final draw. The winner of the Inter-zone play-off final advanced to the final.

Team 1	Agg.	Team 2	1st leg	2nd leg
Istiklol (Tajikistan)	3–2	(India) Bengaluru	1–0	2–2

27 September 2017
19:00 UTC+5

Istiklol (Tajikistan)	1–0	(India) Bengaluru
Barkov 27'	Report

Hisor Central Stadium, Hisor
Attendance: 11,000
Referee: Valentin Kovalenko (Uzbekistan)
18 October 2017
19:00 UTC+5:30

Bengaluru (India)	2–2	(Tajikistan) Istiklol
Bheke 24'; Chhetri 65' (pen.)	Report	Davronov 4' (pen.); Barkov 56'

Sree Kanteerava Stadium, Bangalore
Attendance: 7,862
Referee: Khamis Al-Marri (Qatar)

Istiklol won 3–2 on aggregate.

== Final ==
The draw for the final was held on 6 June 2017. In the final, the winner of the West Asia Zonal final and the winner of the Inter-zone play-off final played each other, with the host team decided by draw.

4 November 2017
18:00 UTC+5

Istiklol (Tajikistan)	0–1	(Iraq) Al-Quwa Al-Jawiya
	Report	Mohsin 68'

Hisor Central Stadium, Hisor
Attendance: 20,000
Referee: Mohammed Abdulla Hassan Mohamed (United Arab Emirates)
