= Kota Kawase =

Japanese footballer (born 1992)

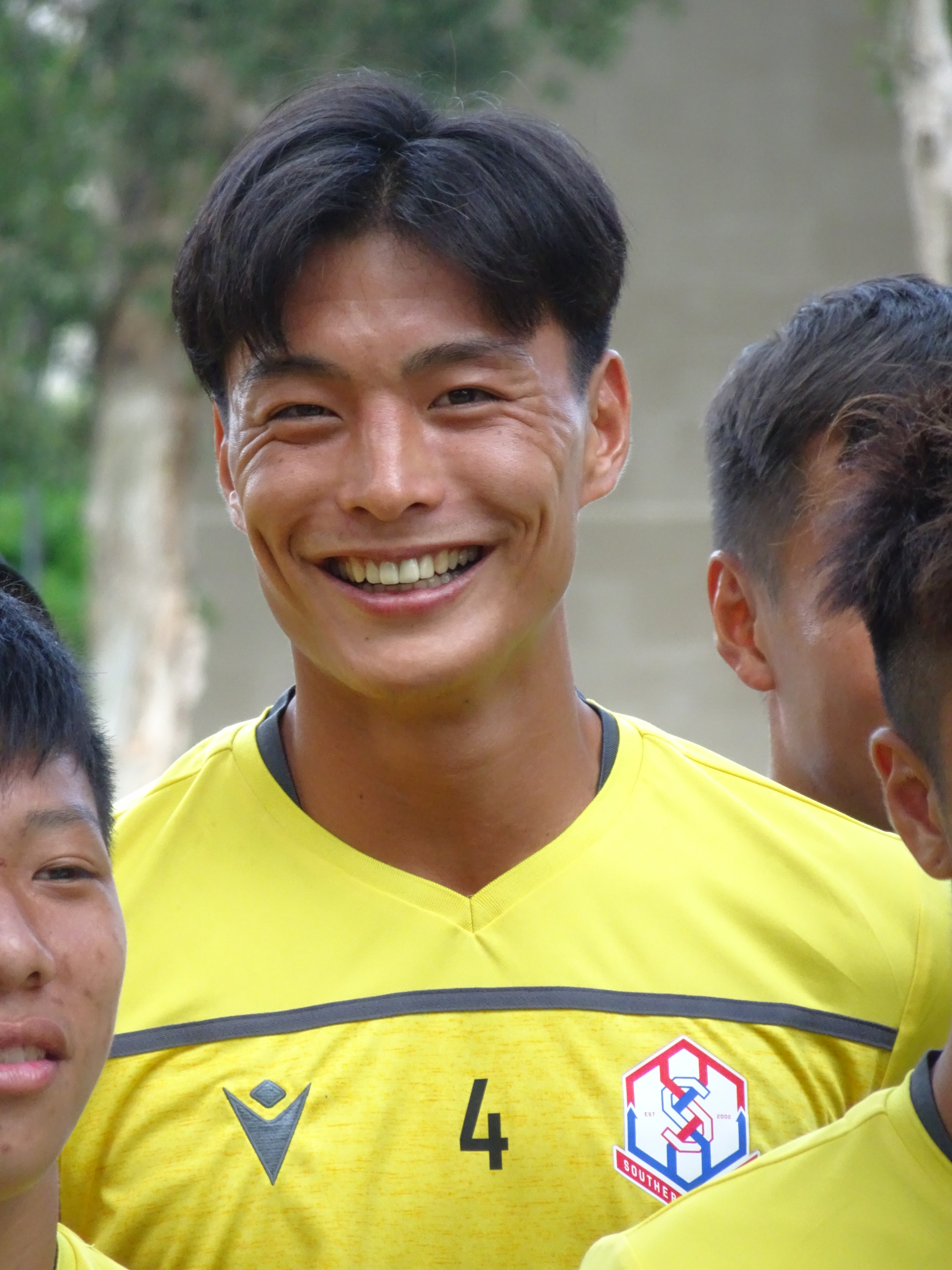
- Kawase with Southern in 2019

Personal information
- Full name: Kota Kawase
- Date of birth: 8 November 1992 (age 34)
- Place of birth: Otaru, Hokkaido, Japan
- Height: 1.90 m (6 ft 3 in)
- Position: Centre back

Team information
- Current team: Southern
- Number: 4

Youth career
- 2008–2010: Sapporo Moiwa High School

College career
Years	Team	Apps	(Gls)
2011–2015	Takushoku University		

Senior career*
Years	Team	Apps	(Gls)
2015–2016	Wollongong United		
2016	Wollongong Wolves	21	(2)
2016–2017	Bonnyrigg White Eagles	1	(0)
2017–2018	Ceres-Negros	28	(3)
2018	UiTM	13	(1)
2018–2019	Dreams FC	3	(2)
2019–	Southern	98	(7)
- * Club domestic league appearances and goals as of 21 November 2026

Kota Kawase (川瀬浩太, Kawase Kota; born 8 November 1992) is a Japanese professional footballer who currently plays as a centre back for Hong Kong Premier League club Southern.

== Career ==
=== Australia ===
Accepting a contract with Wollongong Wolves in late 2015 for his performances with Wollongong United in the Illawarra Premier League, Kawase decided to further his career in Australia due to the physicality of the footballers there as well as its level, setting a league title as his target with United. However, the Wolves were relegated at the end of the 2016 season and the Japanese defender had to leave despite participating in most of their fixtures, claiming to have become more erudite as a footballer.

=== Philippines ===
Bolstering Ceres for the 2017 Philippines Football League and AFC Cup, the Takushoku University alumnus started for the Busmen in their historic two-legged 3-2 win over Home United at the 2017 AFC Cup to become ASEAN Zone champions.

=== Malaysia ===
Kota was announced as one of UiTM's imports for the 2018 Malaysia Premier League with Lucas Pugh and Dechi Marcel N'Guessan.

=== Hong Kong ===
On 21 January 2019, Kota joined Hong Kong Premier League club Dreams FC.

On 26 June 2019, Kawase moved to fellow Hong Kong club Southern.

On 28 April 2020, Southern announced an agreement with Kawase to extend his contract.

== Honour ==
Southern

- Hong Kong Sapling Cup: 2022–23, 2024–25
