= Gabriel Guerra (footballer) =

Argentine footballer (born 1993)

Personal information
- Full name: Gabriel Miguel Guerra
- Date of birth: 17 April 1993 (age 33)
- Place of birth: Buenos Aires, Argentina
- Height: 1.83 m (6 ft 0 in)
- Positions: Midfielder; forward

Youth career
- 2013: Boca Juniors U20

Senior career*
Years	Team	Apps	(Gls)
2014–2018	Boca Juniors B	0	(0)
2015–2016	→ PKNS (loan)	44	(31)
2017	→ Johor Darul Ta'zim II (loan)	2	(5)
2017	→ Johor Darul Ta'zim (loan)	20	(7)
2018	→ Huracán (loan)	0	(0)
2019	PKNS FC	22	(4)
2020	Sarawak United	1	(0)
- * Club domestic league appearances and goals as of 17 March 2020

Gabriel Miguel Guerra (born 17 April 1993) is an Argentine footballer.

== Career statistics ==
=== Club ===
As of 13 September 2019.

Club performance			League		Cup		League Cup		Continental		Total	
Season	Club	League	Apps	Goals	Apps	Goals	Apps	Goals	Apps	Goals	Apps	Goals
PKNS (loan)	2015	Malaysia Premier League	22	16	1	0	9	4	–		32	20
PKNS (loan)	2016	Malaysia Premier League	22	15	5	2	7	3	–		34	20
Total			44	31	6	3	16	7	0	0	66	40
Johor Darul Ta'zim II	2017	Malaysia Premier League	2	5	0	0	0	0	0	0	2	5
Total			2	5	0	0	0	0	0	0	2	5
Johor Darul Ta'zim	2017	Malaysia Super League	20	7	4	2	9	3	8	8	41	20
PKNS	2019	Malaysia Super League	22	4	4	1	5	2	0	0	31	7
Selangor FC	2023	Malaysia Super League	0	0	0	0	0	0	0	0	0	0
Career total			88	47	14	6	30	12	8	8	139	72

== Honours ==
PKNS

- Malaysian FA Cup : Runners-up 2016
- Malaysia Premier League : Runners-up 2016

Johor Darul Ta'zim

- Malaysia Super League : 2017
- Malaysia Cup : 2017
