= 2014–15 PFF National Men's Club Championship =

Tournament details
- Country: Philippines
- Dates: 22 August 2014 – 31 January 2015
- Teams: 8 (Finals)

Final positions
- Champions: Loyola (1st Title)
- Runners-up: Global

Tournament statistics
- Top goal scorer: (Sudan) Izzo El Habbib (7 goals)

Awards
- Best player: (Philippines) Matthew Hartmann

The 2014–15 PFF National Men's Club Championship (also known as 2014–15 PFF–Smart National Club Championship) was the 4th season of the PFF National Men's Club Championship, a Filipino association football competition organized by the Philippine Football Federation.

Ceres were the defending champions, retaining the title for the second time after beating Global, 3-1 on aggregate in a two-leg finals in December 2013.

On 31 January 2015, Loyola Meralco Sparks defeated Global with a scoreline of 2 - 0 to win the title. The cup winners, Loyola Meralco Sparks are guaranteed a place in the 2016 AFC Cup Play-off.

== Competition format ==
Clubs in each Cluster will play a single round robin. The competition format at the Cluster Qualifier Stage will be followed regardless of the number of clubs for each Cluster. The winner in each Cluster and the best second-place club from cluster 1, 2, 3 and 4 in Mindanao and the best 2nd placed club from cluster 6, 7 and 8 in Luzon will be slotted in five groups (Group A, B, C, D, and E) during the Group Qualifiers stage.

Since Negros Oriental Football Association did not participate in the competition, there will be a vacancy in Group C, where it will be filled up by the best ranked 3rd placer in all Clusters (Clusters l-8). The winner in each of the five groups will advance to the National group stage which would include the top three UFL clubs.

The resulting eight clubs will be drawn into two groups (Group A and Group B). The clubs in each group (Group A and Group B) will play single round robin elimination, where top two clubs in each group will advance to the National Semi-Finals. The top two clubs in each group (Group A and Group B) will play in a cross-over format and the loser in Semi-Finals matches will play for 3rd and 4th place.

Winners in semi-final matches will play for the national championship.

== Regional qualifiers ==
The provincial eliminations for the tournament started last April 2014. Clusters from Luzon, Visayas and Mindanao regions underwent qualifiers to be able to advance to the regional group stage in August 2014.

=== National Capital Region Cluster ===
Cluster 5: Top three teams under National Capital Region Football Association gain direct entry to the group stage. Global FC and Stallion FC, although playing in National Capital Region Football Association's United Football League, underwent regional qualifications in their respective Provincial Football Associations (PFA) - Leyte Football Association and Iloilo Football Association respectively.

Top three clubs from the United Football League earned a spot in the National Capital Region Football Association cluster. National Capital Region eliminations were held from August 22–24, 2014. Qualified clubs are as follows:

- Loyola Meralco Sparks FC
- Kaya FC
- Global FC

=== Luzon Cluster ===
Cluster 6: North Luzon eliminations were held on August 23, 2014 in Montalban, Rizal.

- Flame United - Cherifer FC represented Cavite Football Association after winning the local qualifiers on May 23, 2014.
- Mendiola United FC represented Rizal Football Association.

Matches

Mendiola	2 – 1	Flame United

Mendiola United FC won the qualifiers.

Cluster 7: Central Luzon eliminations were held from August 27–29, 2014 at UP Los Baños, Laguna.

- Adriatico FC represented Oriental Mindoro FA.
- Representative from Quezon FA
- Schwarz F.C. represented Laguna Football Association.

Cluster 8: South Luzon eliminations were held from August 29–31, 2014 in Daet, Camarines Norte.

- Representative from Legazpi City - Albay Football Association
- Tribu FC represented Camarines Norte Football Association.
- ABC Stars FC represented Naga City- Camarines Sur Football Association.

Tribu FC won the qualifiers.

=== Visayas Cluster ===
West Visayas cluster

- Stallion FC represented Iloilo Football Association.
- Ceres-La Salle FC represented Negros Occidental Football Association by thrashing FC Bacolod, 7-0, in qualifiers.

East-central Visayas cluster

- Laos FC represented Leyte Football Association.
- ERCO-BRO Nationals represented Cebu Football Association.

=== Mindanao Cluster ===
Cluster 1: West Mindanao eliminations were held on August 22–24, 2014, in Dapitan, Zamboanga del Norte.

- Versache FC represented Misamis Occidental - Ozamis Football Association.
- Zamboanga Hermosa FC represented Zamboanga City Football Association.
- DMC FC represented Zamboanga del Norte - Dipolog Football Association after defeating Dipolog United FC in the finals.
- Saints FC represented Zamboanga del Sur - Pagadian Football Association.

Matches

22 August 2014	DMC	8 – 1	Versache FC	Dapitan, Zamboanga del Norte
13:00				Stadium: JRMSU Sports Grounds

22 August 2014	Zamboanga Hermosa FC	v	Saints FC	Dapitan, Zamboanga del Norte
15:00				Stadium: JRMSU Sports Grounds

23 August 2014	DMC FC	4 – 0	Zamboanga Hermosa FC	Dapitan, Zamboanga del Norte
13:00				Stadium: JRMSU Sports Grounds

23 August 2014	Saints FC	v	Versache FC	Dapitan, Zamboanga del Norte
15:00				Stadium: JRMSU Sports Grounds

24 August 2014	Zamboanga Hermosa FC	v	Versache FC	Dapitan, Zamboanga del Norte
13:00				Stadium: JRMSU Sports Grounds

24 August 2014	DMC FC	v	Saints FC	Dapitan, Zamboanga del Norte
15:00				Stadium: JRMSU Sports Grounds

DMC FC won the qualifiers.

Cluster 2: North Mindanao eliminations were held from August 22–24, 2014 in Valencia, Bukidnon.

- Manolo Fortich FC represented Bukidnon Football Association.
- Ampayon FC represented Butuan-Agusan del Norte Football Association after defeating DSC FC, 3-1, in the local elimination finals.
- Magis FC represented Cagayan de Oro - Misamis Oriental Football Association.
- FC 95 represented Iligan - Lanao del Norte Football Association.

Key to colours in group tables
Group winner advances to the next round

All times are Philippine Standard Time (PST) – UTC+8.

Team	Pld	W	D	L	GF	GA	GD	Pts
Manolo Fortich - Del Monte FC	3	3	0	0	14	2	12	9
Magis FC	3	2	0	1	10	4	6	6
FC 95	3	1	0	2	12	16	−4	3
Ampayon FC	3	0	0	3	4	14	−10	0

Matches

22 August 2014	Manolo Fortich FC	5 – 0	Ampayon FC	Valencia, Bukidnon

22 August 2014	Magis FC	4 – 1	FC 95	Valencia, Bukidnon

23 August 2014	FC 95	4 – 3	Ampayon FC	Valencia, Bukidnon

23 August 2014	Manolo Fortich FC	2 – 1	Magis FC	Valencia, Bukidnon

24 August 2014	Magis FC	5 – 1	Ampayon FC	Valencia, Bukidnon

24 August 2014	Manolo Fortich FC	7 – 1	FC 95	Valencia, Bukidnon

Cluster 3: Central Mindanao eliminations were held from August 29–31, 2014 in Koronadal City, South Cotabato.

- Sultan FC represented Maguindanao - Cotabato City Football Association
- M'lang FC represented North Cotabato Football Association
- Waterking FC represented Sultan Kudarat Football Association
- Real Marbel FC represented Football Association of South Cotabato

Key to colours in group tables
Group winner advances to the next round

All times are Philippine Standard Time (PST) – UTC+8.

Team	Pld	W	D	L	GF	GA	GD	Pts
M'lang	3	2	1	0	14	6	8	7
Real Marbel	3	2	1	0	8	3	5	7
Sultan	3	1	0	2	7	12	−5	3
Waterking	3	0	0	3	3	9	−6	0

Matches

29 August 2014	Sultan FC	2 - 1	Waterking FC	Koronadal, South Cotabato
				Stadium: South Cotabato Sports Complex

29 August 2014	Real Marbel FC	1 - 1	M'lang FC	Koronadal, South Cotabato
				Stadium: South Cotabato Sports Complex

30 August 2014	M'lang FC	6 - 3	Sultan FC	Koronadal, South Cotabato
				Stadium: South Cotabato Sports Complex

30 August 2014	Real Marbel FC	2 - 0 (Game Forfeited)	Waterking FC	Koronadal, South Cotabato
				Stadium: South Cotabato Sports Complex

31 August 2014	Real Marbel FC	5 - 2	Sultan FC	Koronadal, South Cotabato
				Stadium: South Cotabato Sports Complex

31 August 2014	M'lang FC	7 - 2	Waterking FC	Koronadal, South Cotabato
				Stadium: South Cotabato Sports Complex

Cluster 4: East Mindanao eliminations were held from August 29–31, 2014 in Tagum City, Davao del Norte.

- UM Tagum FC represented Davao del Norte Football Association after winning the local qualifiers held from April 20 to May 25, 2014.
- Tandag FC represented Agusan del Sur Football Association.
- Hooligans FC represented Davao Football Association.
- Montevista FC represented Compostela Valley Football Association.

Key to colours in group tables
Group winner advances to the next round

All times are Philippine Standard Time (PST) – UTC+8.

Team	Pld	W	D	L	GF	GA	GD	Pts
UM Tagum	3	2	1	0	17	2	15	7
Hooligans	3	1	2	0	14	2	12	5
Montevista	3	1	1	1	5	6	−1	4
Tandag City	3	0	0	3	2	28	−26	0

Matches

29 August 2014	UM Tagum	1 - 1	Hooligans	Tagum, Davao del Norte
				Stadium: Davao del Norte Sports and Tourism Complex

29 August 2014	Montevista	3 - 2	Tandag City	Tagum, Davao del Norte
				Stadium: Davao del Norte Sports and Tourism Complex

30 August 2014	UM Tagum	3 - 1	Montevista	Tagum, Davao del Norte
				Stadium: Davao del Norte Sports and Tourism Complex

30 August 2014	Hooligans	12 - 0	Tandag City	Tagum, Davao del Norte
				Stadium: Davao del Norte Sports and Tourism Complex

31 August 2014	Hooligans	1 - 1	Montevista	Tagum, Davao del Norte
				Stadium: Davao del Norte Sports and Tourism Complex

31 August 2014	UM Tagum	13 - 0	Tandag City	Tagum, Davao del Norte
				Stadium: Davao del Norte Sports and Tourism Complex

== Group stage ==
Clubs that advanced from the respective cluster eliminations are as follows:

Group A matches were held at North Football Field in Bacolod from September 26–28, 2014.

- Ceres - La Salle FC - Qualified direct from Visayas Cluster (Negros Occidental FA).
- DMC FC - Winner of Cluster 1 (West Mindanao).
- Mendiola United FC - Winner of Cluster 6 (North Luzon).

Key to colours in group tables
Group winner advances to the next round

All times are Philippine Standard Time (PST) – UTC+8.

Team	Pld	W	D	L	GF	GA	GD	Pts
Ceres	2	2	0	0	21	0	21	6
Mendiola	2	1	0	1	7	6	1	3
DMC	2	0	0	2	0	22	−22	0

Matches

26 September 2014	Mendiola	7 – 0	DMC FC	North Football Field, Bacolod
	Pedemonte 42', 45', 74'; Palampan 52'; Flores 81'; Taycung 84'; Sobrano 87'	Report

27 September 2014	Ceres	15 – 0	DMC FC	North Football Field, Bacolod

28 September 2014	Mendiola	0 – 6	Ceres	North Football Field, Bacolod
		Report	de Murga 15'; Panhay 28', 47'; Gallardo 34', 54'; S.M. Kim 57'

Group B matches were held at Central Philippine University Football Field in Iloilo City and Barotac Football Plaza in Barotac Nuevo from September 26–28, 2014.

- Stallion FC - Qualified direct from Visayas cluster (Iloilo FA).
- Del Monte FC - Winner of Cluster 2 (North Mindanao).
- Adriatico FC - Winner of Cluster 7 (Central Luzon).

Key to colours in group tables
Group winner advances to the next round

All times are Philippine Standard Time (PST) – UTC+8.

Team	Pld	W	D	L	GF	GA	GD	Pts
Stallion	2	2	0	0	17	1	16	6
Del Monte FC	2	1	0	1	5	8	−3	3
Adriatico FC	2	0	0	2	1	14	−13	0

Matches

26 September 2014	Stallion	7 – 1	Del Monte

27 September 2014	Del Monte FC	4 - 1	Adriatico FC

28 September 2014	Stallion	10 - 0	Adriatico FC

Group C matches were held at PFF Regional Center in Valencia City, Bukidnon from September 26–28, 2014.

- Zamboanga Hermosa FC - 2nd Best-Ranked Club of Cluster 1. They replaced the representative of Negros Oriental Football Association.
- M'lang FC - Winner of Cluster 3 (South-Central Mindanao).
- Tribu FC - Winner of Cluster 8 (South Luzon).

Group D matches were held at Abellana Sports Complex, Cebu City from October 1–3, 2014.

- ERCO-BRO Nationals - Qualified direct from Visayas cluster (Cebu FA).
- UM-Tagum FC - Winner of Cluster 4 (East Mindanao).
- Real Marbel FC - 2nd Best-Ranked Club from Cluster 3.

Key to colours in group tables
Group winner advances to the next round

All times are Philippine Standard Time (PST) – UTC+8.

Team	Pld	W	D	L	GF	GA	GD	Pts
ERCO-BRO Nationals	2	2	0	0	8	1	7	6
Real Marbel FC	2	0	1	1	1	4	−3	3
UM-Tagum FC	2	0	1	1	2	6	−4	3

Matches

1 October 2014	ERCO-BRO Nationals	3 - 0	Real Marbel FC
14:00	Villarico 50', 74' (pen.); Acre	Report

2 October 2014	UM-Tagum FC	1 - 1	Real Marbel FC
14:00

3 October 2014	ERCO-BRO Nationals	5 - 1	UM-Tagum FC
14:00

Group E

- Laos FC - Qualified direct from Visayas cluster (Leyte FA).
- Magis FC - 2nd Best-Ranked Club from Cluster 2. They replaced the representative of NCR Football Association.
- ABC Stars FC - 2nd Best-Ranked Club from Cluster 8.

Key to colours in group tables
Group winner advances to the next round

All times are Philippine Standard Time (PST) – UTC+8.

Team	Pld	W	D	L	GF	GA	GD	Pts
Laos	2	2	0	0	15	1	+14	6
ABC Stars FC	2	1	0	1	2	11	−9	3
Magis FC	2	0	0	2	2	7	−5	0

Matches

1 October 2014	Magis FC	1 - 2	ABC Stars FC
08:00

2 October 2014	Laos	10 - 0	ABC Stars FC
08:00

3 October 2014	Laos	5 - 1	Magis FC
08:00

== Final phase ==
Teams qualified for the National Group stage of PFF Smart Championship are the following:

- Ceres, winner of Group A.
- Stallion, winner of Group B.
- M'lang FC, winner of Group C.
- ERCO-BRO Nationals, winner of Group D.
- Laos, winner of Group E.
- Global, qualified via United Football League eliminations.
- Loyola Meralco Sparks, qualified via United Football League eliminations.
- Kaya, qualified via United Football League eliminations.

=== Group stage ===
Key to colours in group tables
Group winners and runners-up advance to the crossover Semi-Finals

==== Group A ====
Team	Pld	W	D	L	GF	GA	GD	Pts
Loyola	3	2	1	0	7	2	+5	7
Ceres	3	2	0	1	4	3	+1	6
Kaya	3	1	1	1	10	5	+5	4
Laos	3	0	0	3	0	11	−11	0

22 January 2015	Loyola	4 – 0	Laos	Rizal Memorial Stadium, Manila
	P. Younghusband 34', 60'; M. Hartmann 40'; Fenelon 4'	Report

22 January 2015	Ceres	3 – 2	Kaya	Rizal Memorial Stadium, Manila
	Burkey 32', 59'; Marasigan 54'	Report	Bedic 77', 82'

24 January 2015	Kaya	6 – 0	Laos	Rizal Memorial Stadium, Manila
	Beloya ?'; Bedic ?'; Porteria ?'; Greatwich ?'; Clark ?'; Osei ?'

24 January 2015	Ceres	0 – 1	Loyola	Rizal Memorial Stadium, Manila
		Report	P. Younghusband 15'

26 January 2015	Loyola	2 – 2	Kaya	Rizal Memorial Stadium, Manila
	M. Hartmann 24'; P. Younghusband 36'		Bedic 23', 65'

26 January 2015	Laos	0 – 1	Ceres	Rizal Memorial Stadium, Manila
			Patrick Reichelt 58'

==== Group B ====
Team	Pld	W	D	L	GF	GA	GD	Pts
Global	3	2	1	0	20	1	+19	7
Stallion	3	2	1	0	16	3	+13	7
ERCO-BRO Nationals	3	0	1	2	3	16	−13	1
M'lang	3	0	1	2	3	22	−19	1

23 January 2015	ERCO-BRO Nationals	1 – 5	Stallion	Rizal Memorial Stadium, Manila
	Ayibapreye 51'	Report	Doctora 4'; Clarino 43'; Landry 58', 85'; Mbata 90+2'

23 January 2015	Global	10 – 0	M'lang	Rizal Memorial Stadium, Manila
	Yanagawa 4'; Villanueva 13'; Martínez 21'; Hartmann 32'; El-Habib 61', 70'; Minegishi 66', 86'; Ōtomo 80'; Hoshide 87'	Report

25 January 2015	Global	1 – 1	Stallion	Rizal Memorial Stadium, Manila
	Ōtomo 59'	Report	Landry 73'

25 January 2015	ERCO-BRO Nationals	2 – 2	M'lang	Rizal Memorial Stadium, Manila
	Lavega 11'; Jasangas 66'	Report	Caruscay 22'; Meleke 89'

27 January 2015	Global	9 – 0	ERCO-BRO Nationals	Rizal Memorial Stadium, Manila
	El-Habib 6', 13', 18', 63', 77'; Bahadoran 25'; Hoshide 57'; Hartmann 65'; Kanayama 90'

27 January 2015	Stallion	10 – 1	M'lang	Rizal Memorial Stadium, Manila
	Doctora ?', ?', ?'

=== Knockout stage ===
==== Semi-finals ====
29 January 2015	Loyola	2 – 1 (a.e.t.)	Stallion	Rizal Memorial Stadium, Manila
	M. Hartmann 11'; P. Younghusband 95'		Rota 42'

29 January 2015	Global	3 – 1 (a.e.t.)	Ceres	Rizal Memorial Stadium, Manila
	Hartmann 48', 114'; Villanueva 112'		Ott 2'

==== Battle for Third ====
31 January 2015	Ceres	5 – 0	Stallion	Rizal Memorial Stadium, Manila

==== Final ====
31 January 2015	Loyola	2 – 0	Global	Rizal Memorial Stadium, Manila
	Mallari 18'; Hartmann 57'

== Top Goalscorers ==
Name	Team	Goals
(Sudan) Izzo El Habib	Global	7
(Philippines) Phil Younghusband	Loyola	5
(Philippines) Jovin Bedic	Kaya	5
(Philippines) Mark Hartmann	Global	4
(Spain) Adriano Gallardo	Ceres	4
(Philippines) Matthew Hartmann	Loyola	4
(Philippines) Ruben Doctora	Stallion	3
(Cameroon) Landry Nguene	Stallion	3
(Philippines) Nate Burkey	Ceres	3
(Japan) Yu Hoshide	Global	2
(Japan) Hikaru Minegishi	Global	2
(Philippines) Satoshi Ōtomo	Global	2
(Philippines) Dennis Villanueva	Global	2

== Awards ==
Champions
Loyola Meralco Sparks F.C.

Best Goalkeeper Award	Best Defender Award	Best Midfielder Award	Best Forward Award	Golden Boot	Most Valuable Player
(Philippines) Tomas Trigo (Loyola)	(Spain) Joaquin Cañas (Loyola)	(Philippines) Matthew Hartmann (Loyola)	(Sudan) Izzeldin El Habbib (Global)	(Sudan) Izzeldin El Habbib (Global)	(Philippines) Matthew Hartmann (Loyola)
