= Results of the 2016 Philippine House of Representatives elections by congressional district =

- May 9, 2016
- All 297 seats to the House of Representatives of the Philippines; 149 seats needed for a majority

The following are the results of the 2016 Philippine House of Representatives elections by congressional district.

== Abra ==
Candidate	Party	Votes	%
Joseph Sto. Niño B. Bernos	Liberal Party	63,919	49.70
Marco M. Bautista	Nacionalista Party	53,814	41.84
Joselito Bringas	Independent	7,460	5.80
Cecilia Seares-Luna	Lakas–CMD	3,424	2.66
Total		128,617	100.00

== Agusan del Norte ==
=== 1st District ===
Candidate	Party	Votes	%
Lawrence Lemuel H. Fortun	Liberal Party	88,549	54.06
Roan I. Libarios	Aksyon Demokratiko	75,245	45.94
Total		163,794	100.00

=== 2nd District ===
Candidate	Party	Votes	%
Erlpe John M. Amante	Nacionalista Party	70,937	53.34
Dale Corvera	Liberal Party	62,058	46.66
Total		132,995	100.00

== Agusan del Sur ==
=== 1st District ===
Candidate	Party	Votes	%
Ma. Valentina G. Plaza-Cornelio	National Unity Party	102,671	100.00
Total		102,671	100.00

=== 2nd District ===
Candidate	Party	Votes	%
Evelyn G. Plaza-Mellana	National Unity Party	113,495	100.00
Total		113,495	100.00

== Aklan ==
=== 1st District ===
Candidate	Party	Votes	%
Carlito Marquez	Nationalist People's Coalition	137,144	52.38
Teodorico Haresco Jr.	Nacionalista Party	124,686	47.62
Total		261,830	100.00

== Albay ==
=== 1st District ===
Candidate	Party	Votes	%
Edcel C. Lagman Sr	Liberal Party	102,939	59.91
Antonio Betito	Nationalist People's Coalition	52,555	30.59
Gregorio Luis C. Contacto III	PDP–Laban	16,316	9.50
Total		171,810	100.00

=== 2nd District ===
Candidate	Party	Votes	%
Jose Ma. Clemente S. Salceda	Liberal Party	171,339	91.96
Jose Ma. Los Baños	Independent	5,518	2.96
Danilo Maravillas	Independent	3,869	2.08
Josue Joshua Martinez Jr	Independent	3,546	1.90
Virgilio A. Goyena	Independent	2,051	1.10
Total		186,323	100.00

=== 3rd District ===
Candidate	Party	Votes	%
Fernando V. Gonzalez	Liberal Party	174,554	93.10
Oliver Olaybal	Independent	10,134	5.41
Elmer Felix M. Pornel	Independent	2,803	1.50
Total		187,491	100.00

== Antipolo ==
=== 1st District ===
Candidate	Party	Votes	%
Ma. Cristina A. Roa-Puno	National Unity Party	102,093	81.31
Juanito Lawis	Aksyon Demokratiko	17,183	13.69
Sonia L. Ampo	Independent	4,279	3.41
Florante S. Quizon	Independent	2,004	1.60
Total		125,559	100.00

=== 2nd District ===
Candidate	Party	Votes	%
Romeo Acop	Liberal Party	128,309	100.00
Total		128,309	100.00

== Antique ==
Candidate	Party	Votes	%
Paolo Everardo S. Javier	Liberal Party	120,096	52.62
Raymundo T. Roquero	United Nationalist Alliance	86,727	38.00
Robert Delfin	Nationalist People's Coalition	11,060	4.85
Junior Combong	Independent	3,791	1.66
Narzal B. Mallares	Lapiang Manggagawa	3,748	1.64
Rodelo S. Pidoy	Independent	1,700	0.74
Antero Florante L. Villaflor Jr	Kilusang Bagong Lipunan	1,093	0.48
Total		228,215	100.00

== Apayao ==
Candidate	Party	Votes	%
Eleanor C. Bulut-Begtang	Nationalist People's Coalition	41,654	100.00
Total		41,654	100.00

== Aurora ==
Candidate	Party	Votes	%
Bellaflor A. Angara-Castillo	Laban ng Demokratikong Pilipino	48,868	50.39
Annabelle Tangson	Nacionalista Party	48,114	49.61
Total		96,982	100.00

== Bacolod ==
Candidate	Party	Votes	%
Greg Gasataya	Nationalist People's Coalition	85,467	41.15
Jude Thaddeus Sayson	National Unity Party	84,431	40.65
Carlos Jose Lopez	Liberal Party	18,211	8.77
Archie Baribar	Independent	17,460	8.41
Rolando Villamor	Independent	1,491	0.72
Joel David Enriquez	Independent	628	0.30
Total		207,688	100.00

== Baguio ==
Candidate	Party	Votes	%
Marquez O. Go	Nacionalista Party	45,687	41.27
Nicasio M. Aliping Jr	Liberal Party	40,766	36.82
Bernardo Vergara	Nationalist People's Coalition	20,649	18.65
Rudy Aspilan	Independent	2,957	2.67
Edgardo L. Duque	Independent	648	0.59
Total		110,707	100.00

== Basilan ==
Candidate	Party	Votes	%
Jum Jainudin Akbar	Liberal Party	114,620	74.21
Abdulgani Salapuddin	Nacionalista Party	34,408	22.28
Al-Rasheed Sakkalahul	Independent	5,105	3.31
Sander Antig	Nationalist People's Coalition	323	0.21
Total		154,456	100.00

== Bataan ==
=== 1st District ===
Candidate	Party	Votes	%
Geraldine Roman	Liberal Party	106,015	62.12
Danilo Malana	Aksyon Demokratiko	64,643	37.88
Total		170,658	100.00

=== 2nd District ===
Candidate	Party	Votes	%
Jose Enrique S. Garcia III	National Unity Party	177,345	100.00
Total		177,345	100.00

== Batanes ==
Candidate	Party	Votes	%
Henedina Abad	Liberal Party	4,236	46.93
Efren Lizardo	Nationalist People's Coalition	1,795	19.88
Alex Narag	Independent	1,517	16.81
Nicanor Abad	United Nationalist Alliance	1,479	16.38
Total		9,027	100.00

== Batangas ==
=== 1st District ===
Candidate	Party	Votes	%
Ma. Elenita Milagros R. Ermita-Buhain	Nacionalista Party	191,351	81.36
Valentino Lopez	Independent	43,846	18.64
Total		235,197	100.00

=== 2nd District ===
Candidate	Party	Votes	%
Raneo Abu	Nacionalista Party	78,369	59.78
Nicanor M. Conti	National Unity Party	52,733	40.22
Total		131,102	100.00

=== 3rd District ===
Candidate	Party	Votes	%
Maria Theresa Collantes	Liberal Party	186,440	100.00
Total		186,440	100.00

=== 4th District ===
Candidate	Party	Votes	%
Lianda Bolilia	Liberal Party	110,485	54.73
Victor Portugal Jr	Nationalist People's Coalition	91,392	45.27
Total		201,877	100.00

=== 5th District ===
Candidate	Party	Votes	%
Mario Vittorio A. Mariño	Liberal Party	69,577	48.92
Danilo M. Berberabe	United Nationalist Alliance	46,967	33.02
Hernando Perez	Independent	15,951	11.22
Felipe Baroja	Independent	5,587	3.93
Carlito D. Bisa	Independent	4,145	2.91
Total		142,227	100.00

=== 6th District ===
Candidate	Party	Votes	%
Rosa Vilma T. Santos-Recto	Liberal Party	83,492	58.00
Bernadette P. Sabili	National Unity Party	60,472	42.00
Total		143,964	100.00

== Benguet ==
Candidate	Party	Votes	%
Ronald M. Cosalan	Liberal Party	87,445	52.59
Nestor B. Fongwan Sr	National Unity Party	78,822	47.41
Total		166,267	100.00

== Biliran ==
Candidate	Party	Votes	%
Rogelio Espina	Liberal Party	54,844	100.00
Total		54,844	100.00

== Biñan ==
Candidate	Party	Votes	%
Marlyn B. Alonte-Naguiat	Liberal Party	88,773	100.00
Total		88,773	100.00

== Bohol ==
=== 1st District ===
Candidate	Party	Votes	%
Rene Relampagos	Liberal Party	147,405	79.48
Joahna Cabalit-Initay	United Nationalist Alliance	28,516	15.38
Cresencio Alturas	PDP–Laban	9,547	5.15
Total		185,468	100.00

=== 2nd District ===
Candidate	Party	Votes	%
Erico Aristotle C. Aumentado	Nationalist People's Coalition	134,537	72.94
Gerardo Garcia	National Unity Party	49,909	27.06
Total		184,446	100.00

=== 3rd District ===
Candidate	Party	Votes	%
Arthur C. Yap	Nationalist People's Coalition	121,854	57.25
Conchita Toribio-delos Reyes	PDP–Laban	90,973	42.75
Total		212,827	100.00

== Bukidnon ==
=== 1st District ===
Candidate	Party	Votes	%
Ma. Lourdes O. Acosta-Alba	Liberal Party	106,194	93.22
Andres A. Eligan Jr	Independent	4,098	3.60
Petronilo Sumampong	Independent	3,629	3.19
Total		113,921	100.00

=== 2nd District ===
Candidate	Party	Votes	%
Florencio T. Flores Jr	Nacionalista Party	98,164	100.00
Total		98,164	100.00

=== 3rd District ===
Candidate	Party	Votes	%
Manuel Antonio F. Zubiri	Bukidnon Paglaum	129,678	90.61
Henry Iligan	Independent	13,441	9.39
Total		143,119	100.00

=== 4th District ===
Candidate	Party	Votes	%
Rogelio Neil Roque	Nationalist People's Coalition	66,964	63.70
Jemsly James Bation	Independent	36,067	34.31
Beverly Navarro	Independent	2,088	1.99
Total		105,119	100.00

== Bulacan ==
=== 1st District ===
Candidate	Party	Votes	%
Jose Antonio Sy-Alvarado	Liberal Party	157,828	57.08
Michael C. Fermin	Nationalist People's Coalition	118,663	42.92
Total		276,491	100.00

=== 2nd District ===
Candidate	Party	Votes	%
Gavini C. Pancho	National Unity Party	266,647	94.61
Jaime E. Villafuerte	Independent	11,609	4.12
Luisito C. Angeles	Kilusang Bagong Lipunan	3,587	1.27
Total		281,843	100.00

=== 3rd District ===
Candidate	Party	Votes	%
Lorna F. Cillian-Silverio	National Unity Party	119,988	52.04
Joselito Andrew R. Mendoza	Liberal Party	110,573	47.96
Total		230,561	100.00

=== 4th District ===
Candidate	Party	Votes	%
Linabelle Villarica	Liberal Party	216,963	84.42
Joan V. Alarilla	Nationalist People's Coalition	40,043	15.58
Total		257,006	100.00

== Cagayan ==
=== 1st District ===
Candidate	Party	Votes	%
Ramon C. Nolasco Jr	Liberal Party	89,123	54.00
Juan C. Ponce Enrile Jr	Nationalist People's Coalition	75,926	46.00
Total		165,049	100.00

=== 2nd District ===
Candidate	Party	Votes	%
Baby Aline Vargas-Alfonso	National Unity Party	74,081	76.90
Darwin B. Sacramed	Liberal Party	22,256	23.10
Total		96,337	100.00

=== 3rd District ===
Candidate	Party	Votes	%
Randolph Ting	National Unity Party	118,674	66.37
Raymund P. Guzman	Liberal Party	50,253	28.11
Isarco Antonio	United Nationalist Alliance	5,449	3.05
Carmelo Lasam	Independent	4,419	2.47
Total		178,795	100.00

== Cagayan de Oro ==
=== 1st District ===
Candidate	Party	Votes	%
Rolando Uy	Liberal Party	57,094	52.72
Lourdes Darimbang	Independent	51,208	47.28
Total		108,302	100.00

=== 2nd District ===
Candidate	Party	Votes	%
Maximo Rodriguez Jr.	Independent	46,363	40.06
Ramon B. Tabor	United Nationalist Alliance	34,123	29.48
Edgar S. Cabanlas	Liberal Party	29,343	25.35
Evangeline Carrasco	Independent	4,905	4.24
Chito Fernandez	Independent	507	0.44
Celso Balat	Independent	502	0.43
Total		115,743	100.00

== Caloocan ==
=== 1st District ===
Candidate	Party	Votes	%
Dale Gonzalo R. Malapitan	Liberal Party	215,639	68.49
Susana G. Punzalan	Nationalist People's Coalition	90,950	28.89
Romualdo C. Orbe	Partido Bagong Maharlika	2,996	0.95
Garth M. Gollayan	PDP–Laban	2,376	0.75
Violeta dela Cruz	Independent	1,744	0.55
Glenn Openiano	Independent	1,160	0.37
Total		314,865	100.00

=== 2nd District ===
Candidate	Party	Votes	%
Edgardo R. Erice	Liberal Party	101,051	64.53
Mary Mitzi L. Cajayon-Uy	Nationalist People's Coalition	52,549	33.56
Edgardo Espiritu	Partido Bagong Maharlika	2,996	1.91
Total		156,596	100.00

== Camarines Norte ==
=== 1st District ===
Candidate	Party	Votes	%
Renato J. Unico Jr	Liberal Party	56,143	51.15
Josefina Tallado	Nationalist People's Coalition	53,620	48.85
Total		109,763	100.00

=== 2nd District ===
Candidate	Party	Votes	%
Marisol Panotes	Liberal Party	54,406	47.26
Liwayway Vinzons-Chato	Nationalist People's Coalition	45,414	39.45
Senen Jerez	Nacionalista Party	12,695	11.03
Donald E. Asis	Independent	2,019	1.75
Reynante Napao	Independent	360	0.31
Romeo Balmeo	Independent	230	0.20
Total		115,124	100.00

== Camarines Sur ==
=== 1st District ===
Candidate	Party	Votes	%
Rolando Aureo G. Andaya Jr	Nationalist People's Coalition	55,526	70.70
Apolinar Rull Napoles	Liberal Party	22,185	28.25
Nestor V. de los Reyes	Nacionalista Party	830	1.06
Total		78,541	100.00

=== 2nd District ===
Candidate	Party	Votes	%
Luis Raymund Villafuerte	Nacionalista Party	88,693	70.55
Asuncion Arceño	Nationalist People's Coalition	37,029	29.45
Total		125,722	100.00

=== 3rd District ===
Candidate	Party	Votes	%
Gabriel H. Bordado Jr	Liberal Party	100,127	55.26
Luis R. Villafuerte Sr	Nationalist People's Coalition	81,074	44.74
Total		181,201	100.00

=== 4th District ===
Candidate	Party	Votes	%
Arnulfo Fuentebella	Nationalist People's Coalition	83,969	49.88
Imelda Papin	Liberal Party	83,229	49.44
William Iliw-Iliw	Lapiang Manggagawa	1,138	0.68
Total		168,336	100.00

=== 5th District ===
Candidate	Party	Votes	%
Salvio Fortuno	Liberal Party	134,372	78.56
Felix R. Alfelor Jr	United Nationalist Alliance	36,680	21.44
Total		171,052	100.00

== Camiguin ==
Candidate	Party	Votes	%
Xavier Jesus Romualdo	Liberal Party	40,383	88.56
Manuel Jaudian	PDP–Laban	5,217	11.44
Total		45,600	100.00

== Capiz ==
=== 1st District ===
Candidate	Party	Votes	%
Emmanuel A. Billones Sr	Liberal Party	103,872	78.39
Medardo Pestaño	United Nationalist Alliance	28,639	21.61
Total		132,511	100.00

=== 2nd District ===
Candidate	Party	Votes	%
Fredenil H. Castro	National Unity Party	118,433	100.00
Total		118,433	100.00

== Catanduanes ==
Candidate	Party	Votes	%
Cesar V. Sarmiento	Liberal Party	86,857	66.36
Hector S. Sanchez	United Nationalist Alliance	37,799	28.88
Leandro Verceles Jr.	Independent	6,240	4.77
Total		130,896	100.00

== Cavite ==
=== 1st District ===
Candidate	Party	Votes	%
Francis Gerald Abaya	Liberal Party	115,891	89.19
Marina Rieta Granados	Nationalist People's Coalition	14,053	10.81
Total		129,944	100.00

=== 2nd District ===
Candidate	Party	Votes	%
Edwin "Strike" M. Revilla	Lakas–CMD	141,468	89.71
Mark Orline Buena	Liberal Party	16,228	10.29
Total		157,696	100.00

=== 3rd District ===
Candidate	Party	Votes	%
Alex L. Advincula	Liberal Party	106,268	100.00
Total		106,268	100.00

=== 4th District ===
Candidate	Party	Votes	%
Jennifer N. Austria-Barzaga	National Unity Party	227,022	95.35
Alen Manzano	Independent	11,064	4.65
Total		238,086	100.00

=== 5th District ===
Candidate	Party	Votes	%
Roy Loyola	Liberal Party	135,405	73.34
Ruben Madlansacay	Nacionalista Party	49,209	26.66
Total		184,614	100.00

=== 6th District ===
Candidate	Party	Votes	%
Luis Ferrer IV	National Unity Party	178,074	100.00
Total		178,074	100.00

=== 7th District ===
Candidate	Party	Votes	%
Abraham Tolentino	Liberal Party	164,168	100.00
Total		164,168	100.00

== Cebu ==
=== 1st District ===
Candidate	Party	Votes	%
Gerald Anthony V. Gullas Jr	Nacionalista Party/Alayon	186,091	65.23
Antonio Canoy	Nationalist People's Coalition	92,589	32.45
Michael Nuñez	PDP–Laban	6,612	2.32
Total		285,292	100.00

=== 2nd District ===
Candidate	Party	Votes	%
Wilfredo Caminero	Liberal Party	81,167	80.75
Teresita Celis	One Cebu	11,893	11.83
Cora-Lou B. Kintanar	United Nationalist Alliance	7,453	7.41
Total		100,513	100.00

=== 3rd District ===
Candidate	Party	Votes	%
Gwendolyn Garcia	United Nationalist Alliance/One Cebu	140,097	62.18
Grecilda Sanchez-Zaballero	Liberal Party	83,023	36.85
Teodoro Osorio	Independent	2,206	0.98
Total		225,326	100.00

=== 4th District ===
Candidate	Party	Votes	%
Benhur Salimbangon	National Unity Party	135,437	60.93
Celestino E. Martinez Jr	Liberal Party	86,836	39.07
Total		222,273	100.00

=== 5th District ===
Candidate	Party	Votes	%
Ramon Durano VI	Nationalist People's Coalition/BAKUD	172,659	87.61
Gilbert R. Wagas	United Nationalist Alliance/One Cebu	24,425	12.39
Total		197,084	100.00

=== 6th District ===
Candidate	Party	Votes	%
Jonas Cortes	Liberal Party	154,524	72.51
Paulus Cañete	One Cebu	58,586	27.49
Total		213,110	100.00

=== 7th District ===
Candidate	Party	Votes	%
Peter John Calderon	Liberal Party	58,616	56.98
Pablo John Garcia	One Cebu	44,253	43.02
Total		102,869	100.00

== Cebu City ==
=== 1st District ===
Candidate	Party	Votes	%
Raul del Mar	Liberal Party/BO-PK	134,940	66.26
Alvin Garcia	United Nationalist Alliance/Partido Barug	64,348	31.60
Ricardo Adlawan	Independent	2,400	1.18
Juan U. Arenasa	Independent	1,952	0.96
Total		203,640	100.00

=== 2nd District ===
Candidate	Party	Votes	%
Rodrigo A. Abellanosa Sr	Liberal Party/BO-PK	149,259	59.28
Gerardo Carillo	United Nationalist Alliance/Partido Barug	97,491	38.72
Lea F. Ong	Independent	5,022	1.99
Total		251,772	100.00

== Compostela Valley ==
=== 1st District ===
Candidate	Party	Votes	%
Ma. Carmen S. Zamora-Apsay	Liberal Party	89,546	63.43
Joselito Brillantes	Aksyon Demokratiko	51,627	36.57
Total		141,173	100.00

=== 2nd District ===
Candidate	Party	Votes	%
Ruwel Peter Gonzaga	Liberal Party	87,231	52.83
Jose R. Caballero	Aksyon Demokratiko	77,884	47.17
Total		165,115	100.00

== Cotabato ==
=== 1st District ===
Candidate	Party	Votes	%
Jesus N. Sacdalan	Liberal Party	115,004	71.54
Fernando C. Sacdalan	Independent	40,290	25.06
Abdullatip Sabpel	Independent	4,558	2.84
Alex R. Alang	Independent	908	0.56
Total		160,760	100.00

=== 2nd District ===
Candidate	Party	Votes	%
Nancy Catamco	Liberal Party	94,845	57.85
Airene Claire P. Villarico	Independent	66,220	40.39
Virgilio O. Aspilla	Independent	2,872	1.75
Total		163,937	100.00

=== 3rd District ===
Candidate	Party	Votes	%
Jose Tejada	Liberal Party	96,558	61.53
Maybell Valdevieso	Independent	54,408	34.67
Amin G. Sindao	Independent	3,025	1.93
Samuel Bale	Kilusang Bagong Lipunan	2,304	1.47
Hyner Descalso	Independent	631	0.40
Total		156,926	100.00

== Davao City ==
=== 1st District ===
Candidate	Party	Votes	%
Karlo Alexei B. Nograles	National Unity Party	197,904	100.00
Total		197,904	100.00

=== 2nd District ===
Candidate	Party	Votes	%
Mylene J. Garcia-Albano	Liberal Party	148,509	90.03
Christopher Abierra	Independent	16,455	9.97
Total		164,964	100.00

=== 3rd District ===
Candidate	Party	Votes	%
Alberto T. Ungab	Nacionalista Party	114,910	68.30
Karlo S. Bello	Hugpong sa Tawong Lungsod	53,334	31.70
Total		168,244	100.00

== Davao del Norte ==
=== 1st District ===
Candidate	Party	Votes	%
Pantaleon Alvarez	PDP–Laban	69,108	40.63
Arrel Olaño	Nationalist People's Coalition	52,478	30.85
Nicandro Suaybaguio Jr	Independent	41,766	24.55
Emmanuel A. Mahipus	Independent	4,352	2.56
Richard Dexter Welborn	Pwersa ng Masang Pilipino	2,402	1.41
Total		170,106	100.00

=== 2nd District ===
Candidate	Party	Votes	%
Antonio R. Floirendo Jr	Kusog Baryohanon	170,832	100.00
Total		170,832	100.00

== Davao del Sur ==
Candidate	Party	Votes	%
Mercedes C. Cagas	Nacionalista Party	120,968	48.07
Joel Ray Lopez	Liberal Party	97,037	38.56
Wilhelmina B. King-Almendras	Independent	24,743	9.83
Pablo C. Villaber	Kilusang Bagong Lipunan	8,897	3.54
Total		251,645	100.00

== Davao Occidental ==
Candidate	Party	Votes	%
Lorna Bautista-Bandigan	Liberal Party	53,461	100.00
Total		53,461	100.00

== Davao Oriental ==
=== 1st District ===
Candidate	Party	Votes	%
Corazon T. Nuñez-Malanyaon	Nacionalista Party	52,416	62.18
Ronie S. Osnan	Independent	25,759	30.56
Eufronio T. Mangui-ob	Nationalist People's Coalition	6,125	7.27
Total		84,300	100.00

=== 2nd District ===
Candidate	Party	Votes	%
Joel Mayo Z. Almario	Liberal Party	74,840	62.08
Delfin Miones	Nacionalista Party	45,712	37.92
Total		120,552	100.00

== Dinagat Islands ==
Candidate	Party	Votes	%
Arlene J. Bag-ao	Liberal Party	25,363	54.99
Geraldine B. Ecleo-Villaroman	United Nationalist Alliance	20,758	45.01
Total		46,121	100.00

== Eastern Samar ==
Candidate	Party	Votes	%
Ben Evardone	Liberal Party	132,089	58.32
Annaliza G. Kwan	Nacionalista Party	94,388	41.68
Total		226,477	100.00

== Guimaras ==
Candidate	Party	Votes	%
Ma. Lucille L. Nava	Liberal Party	50,922	59.44
Henry G. Babiera	United Nationalist Alliance	31,738	37.05
Vicente de Asis	Nationalist People's Coalition	3,005	3.51
Total		85,665	100.00

== Ifugao ==
Candidate	Party	Votes	%
Teodoro B. Baguilat Jr	Liberal Party	49,640	55.47
Solomon Chungalao	Independent	39,847	44.53
Total		89,487	100.00

== Iligan ==
Candidate	Party	Votes	%
Frederick W. Siao	United Nationalist Alliance	34,222	29.93
Alipio Cirilo V. Badelles	Nationalist People's Coalition	26,267	22.98
Lawrence Lluch-Cruz	Liberal Party	21,521	18.82
Vermin Quimco	Centrist Democratic Party of the Philippines	13,662	11.95
Franklin Quijano	PDP–Laban	13,540	11.84
Melchora Ambalong	Independent	2,378	2.08
Uriel G. Borja	Independent	1,993	1.74
Samson N. Dajao	Independent	381	0.33
Luis Carillo	Independent	363	0.32
Total		114,327	100.00

== Ilocos Norte ==
=== 1st District ===
Candidate	Party	Votes	%
Rodolfo C. Fariñas Sr	Liberal Party	138,196	96.56
Reynaldo Francisco R. Remigio Jr	Kilusang Bagong Lipunan	3,213	2.24
Ruel Mandac	United Nationalist Alliance	1,712	1.20
Total		143,121	100.00

=== 2nd District ===
Candidate	Party	Votes	%
Imelda Remedios Visitación T. Romuáldez-Marcos	Nacionalista Party	134,725	98.47
Lorenzo S. Madamba	Independent	2,095	1.53
Total		136,820	100.00

== Ilocos Sur ==
=== 1st District ===
Candidate	Party	Votes	%
Deogracias Victor Savellano	Nacionalista Party	83,050	60.08
Christian Purisima	Independent	55,193	39.92
Total		138,243	100.00

=== 2nd District ===
Candidate	Party	Votes	%
Eric D. Singson Sr	Liberal Party	158,626	93.33
Henry S. Capela	Independent	9,478	5.58
Med Balicdang	PDP–Laban	1,859	1.09
Total		169,963	100.00

== Iloilo ==
=== 1st District ===
Candidate	Party	Votes	%
Oscar Richard S. Garin Jr	Liberal Party	133,811	87.98
Gerardo N. Flores	Nationalist People's Coalition	18,283	12.02
Total		152,094	100.00

=== 2nd District ===
Candidate	Party	Votes	%
Arcadio H. Gorriceta	Liberal Party	99,957	70.62
June Mondejar	United Nationalist Alliance	41,585	29.38
Total		141,542	100.00

=== 3rd District ===
Candidate	Party	Votes	%
Arthur Defensor Jr.	Liberal Party	148,941	100.00
Total		148,941	100.00

=== 4th District ===
Candidate	Party	Votes	%
Ferjenel Biron	National Unity Party	108,394	62.85
Carmen Rita Monfort-Bautista	Independent	63,465	36.80
Felicito Dolar Jr	Independent	609	0.35
Total		172,468	100.00

=== 5th District ===
Candidate	Party	Votes	%
Raul Tupas	Nationalist People's Coalition	117,610	59.57
Yvonne Angeli C. Lee-Tupas	Liberal Party	79,833	40.43
Total		197,443	100.00

== Iloilo City ==
Candidate	Party	Votes	%
Geronimo P. Treñas	Liberal Party	166,659	85.96
Daniel Cartagena	United Nationalist Alliance	27,222	14.04
Total		193,881	100.00

== Isabela ==
=== 1st District ===
Candidate	Party	Votes	%
Rodolfo Albano III	Nacionalista Party	139,998	98.41
Stephen G. Soliven	Independent	2,258	1.59
Total		142,256	100.00

=== 2nd District ===
Candidate	Party	Votes	%
Ana Cristina S. Go	Liberal Party	93,694	59.58
Edwin C. Uy	PDP–Laban	63,574	40.42
Total		157,268	100.00

=== 3rd District ===
Candidate	Party	Votes	%
Napoleon S. Dy	Nationalist People's Coalition	134,731	100.00
Total		134,731	100.00

=== 4th District ===
Candidate	Party	Votes	%
Ma. Lourdes R. Aggabao	Nationalist People's Coalition	96,446	51.93
Danilo S. Tan	Liberal Party	75,075	40.43
Hexilon Josephat Thaddeus G. Alvarez	Independent	9,529	5.13
Maximo Dirige	Philippine Green Republican Party	3,619	1.95
Nicolas M. de Guzman Jr	Independent	1,037	0.56
Total		185,706	100.00

== Kalinga ==
Candidate	Party	Votes	%
Allan Jesse C. Mangaoang	Liberal Party	54,006	55.73
Camilo T. Lammawin Jr	Nationalist People's Coalition	42,176	43.52
Carlos Duyan	Independent	728	0.75
Total		96,910	100.00

== La Union ==
=== 1st District ===
Candidate	Party	Votes	%
Pablo C. Ortega	Liberal Party	117,845	75.30
Manuel Victor R. Ortega Jr	Independent	26,633	17.02
Justo Oros III	Independent	12,017	7.68
Total		156,495	100.00

=== 2nd District ===
Candidate	Party	Votes	%
Sandra Eriguel	Nationalist People's Coalition	150,020	78.87
Tomas L. Dumpit Jr	National Unity Party	40,201	21.13
Total		190,221	100.00

== Laguna ==
=== 1st District ===
Candidate	Party	Votes	%
Arlene B. Arcillas-Nazareno	Liberal Party	196,440	100.00
Total		196,440	100.00

=== 2nd District ===
Candidate	Party	Votes	%
Joaquin M. Chipeco Jr	Liberal Party	270,906	100.00
Total		270,906	100.00

=== 3rd District ===
Candidate	Party	Votes	%
Marisol C. Aragones-Sampelo	United Nationalist Alliance	147,668	71.00
Florante L. Aquino	Liberal Party	39,222	18.86
Damaso Amante	Nationalist People's Coalition	19,215	9.24
Ma. Cristina T. Villamor	Independent	1,887	0.91
Total		207,992	100.00

=== 4th District ===
Candidate	Party	Votes	%
Benjamin Agarao Jr.	Liberal Party	137,760	57.61
Edgar San Luis	National Unity Party	99,535	41.63
Fidel Santos	Independent	1,814	0.76
Total		239,109	100.00

== Lanao del Norte ==
=== 1st District ===
Candidate	Party	Votes	%
Mohamad Khalid Dimaporo	Liberal Party	79,882	83.24
Joseph Mohamad Sangila Jr	United Nationalist Alliance	12,303	12.82
Dunhill Palomares	Independent	3,781	3.94
Total		95,966	100.00

=== 2nd District ===
Candidate	Party	Votes	%
Abdullah D. Dimaporo	Nationalist People's Coalition	80,691	68.85
Omar Usup	United Nationalist Alliance	36,511	31.15
Total		117,202	100.00

== Lanao del Sur ==
=== 1st District ===
Candidate	Party	Votes	%
Ansaruddin Abdul Malik A. Adiong	Liberal Party	78,851	54.62
Faysah Racman Pimping M. Dumarpa	United Nationalist Alliance	64,830	44.91
Calawanan Otara	Independent	450	0.31
Mar Paiso	Independent	231	0.16
Total		144,362	100.00

=== 2nd District ===
Candidate	Party	Votes	%
Mauyag B. Papandayan Jr	PDP–Laban	65,365	50.64
Yasser Balindong	Liberal Party	61,542	47.68
Mohammad Hafez Marohom	Nationalist People's Coalition	1,212	0.94
Rommel Alonto	Independent	962	0.75
Total		129,081	100.00

== Lapu-Lapu City ==
Candidate	Party	Votes	%
Aileen C. Radaza	Liberal Party	86,069	64.63
Celedonio B. Sitoy	PDP–Laban	33,043	24.81
Reynaldo Berdin	United Nationalist Alliance	5,967	4.48
Paulo Cabahug	Independent	3,875	2.91
Rene Espina	Nationalist People's Coalition	2,364	1.78
Niño Luis Jamili	Independent	1,038	0.78
Pablo Q. Doronio Jr	Philippine Green Republican Party	807	0.61
Total		133,163	100.00

== Las Piñas ==
Candidate	Party	Votes	%
Mark Villar	Nacionalista Party	174,533	86.05
Zardi Melito D. Abellera	PDP–Laban	23,780	11.72
Filipino R. Alvarado	United Nationalist Alliance	4,509	2.22
Total		202,822	100.00

== Leyte ==
=== 1st District ===
Candidate	Party	Votes	%
Yedda Marie M. Kittilsvedt-Romualdez	Lakas–CMD	147,477	73.66
Feliciano B. Clemencio	Independent	51,550	25.75
Jose T. Jacla	Independent	1,191	0.59
Total		200,218	100.00

=== 2nd District ===
Candidate	Party	Votes	%
Henry C. Ong	Nationalist People's Coalition	95,534	52.64
Sergio Antonio F. Apostol	Liberal Party	82,768	45.60
Alberto N. Hidalgo	Independent	2,249	1.24
Gary Ramos	PDP–Laban	943	0.52
Total		181,494	100.00

=== 3rd District ===
Candidate	Party	Votes	%
Vicente Sofronio E. Veloso III	National Unity Party	43,333	50.03
Ma. Victoria Y. Salvacion-David	Liberal Party	43,277	49.97
Total		86,610	100.00

=== 4th District ===
Candidate	Party	Votes	%
Lucy Marie M. Torres-Gomez	Liberal Party	137,601	62.50
Violeta C. Codilla	Aksyon Demokratiko	82,557	37.50
Total		220,158	100.00

=== 5th District ===
Candidate	Party	Votes	%
Jose Carlos L. Cari	Liberal Party	134,955	91.81
Marciano Jose V. Galenzoga	United Nationalist Alliance	12,033	8.19
Total		146,988	100.00

== Maguindanao ==
=== 1st District ===
Candidate	Party	Votes	%
Bai Sandra S. Ampatuan-Sema	Liberal Party	119,075	57.29
Tucao Mastura	United Nationalist Alliance	87,687	42.19
H'Je Palacala	Independent	595	0.29
Bufford Beto	Independent	501	0.24
Total		207,858	100.00

=== 2nd District ===
Candidate	Party	Votes	%
Zajid G. Mangudadatu	Liberal Party	104,389	77.77
Roger L. Mamalo	Independent	21,451	15.98
Lowell Macabangen	Nationalist People's Coalition	5,375	4.00
Pendatun A. Pangadil	Independent	3,012	2.24
Total		134,227	100.00

== Makati ==
=== 1st District ===
Candidate	Party	Votes	%
Manuel Monsour T. Del Rosario III	United Nationalist Alliance	76,728	60.27
Norman Nicholas Garcia	Liberal Party	38,377	30.14
Wilfredo M. Talag	Nationalist People's Coalition	6,043	4.75
Eugenia Carreon	Independent	3,580	2.81
Lourdesiree Latimer	Independent	2,584	2.03
Total		127,312	100.00

=== 2nd District ===
Candidate	Party	Votes	%
Luis Jose Angel N. Campos Jr	United Nationalist Alliance	79,748	54.01
Israel S. Cruzado	Liberal Party	62,145	42.09
Levi Perez	Partido Bagong Maharlika	3,394	2.30
Joel A. Sarza	Independent	1,248	0.85
Marvin Porciuncula	Independent	1,111	0.75
Total		147,646	100.00

== Malabon ==
Candidate	Party	Votes	%
Federico S. Sandoval II	Nationalist People's Coalition	69,887	49.96
Ma. Teresa A. Aquino-Oreta	Liberal Party	68,108	48.69
Robin Simon	Independent	1,886	1.35
Total		139,881	100.00

== Mandaluyong ==
Candidate	Party	Votes	%
Alexandria Pahati-Gonzales	Liberal Party	122,792	88.95
Francisco R. Reyes	Independent	9,543	6.91
Jack V. Ramel	PDP–Laban	4,147	3.00
Albert Yap	Independent	1,560	1.13
Total		138,042	100.00

== Manila ==
=== 1st District ===
Candidate	Party	Votes	%
Manuel Luis T. Lopez	Nationalist People's Coalition	55,627	35.35
Roberto R. Asilo	Liberal Party	43,640	27.73
Ernesto M. Dionisio Jr	Independent	42,878	27.25
Erick Ian O. Nieva	Independent	15,223	9.67
Total		157,368	100.00

=== 2nd District ===
Candidate	Party	Votes	%
Carlo Vincent V. Lopez	Liberal Party	72,409	100.00
Total		72,409	100.00

=== 3rd District ===
Candidate	Party	Votes	%
John Marvin C. Nieto	Asenso Manileño	46,353	44.93
Harry Angping	Nacionalista Party	38,636	37.45
Ramon D. Morales	Liberal Party	17,021	16.50
Ricardo Lee	Independent	689	0.67
Edgardo Ruiz	Independent	472	0.46
Total		103,171	100.00

=== 4th District ===
Candidate	Party	Votes	%
Edward Maceda	Asenso Manileño	46,349	41.53
Don Juan Bagatsing	KABAKA	23,807	21.33
Science A. Reyes	Independent	23,650	21.19
Rosemary Leilani B. Bonoan	National Unity Party	16,525	14.81
Jobe Sherwin E. Nkemakolam	PDP–Laban	1,263	1.13
Total		111,594	100.00

=== 5th District ===
Candidate	Party	Votes	%
Amanda Christina L. Bagatsing	KABAKA	48,380	37.40
Jose D. Hizon Jr	Pwersa ng Masang Pilipino	34,952	27.02
Mary Ann L. Susano	Nationalist People's Coalition	27,083	20.93
Josefina M. Siscar	Liberal Party	16,420	12.69
Jupakar P. Arabani	PDP–Laban	1,882	1.45
Mario P. Cayabyab	Lapiang Manggagawa	655	0.51
Total		129,372	100.00

=== 6th District ===
Candidate	Party	Votes	%
Rosenda Ann M. Ocampo	Liberal Party	56,844	53.41
Bienvenido M. Abante Jr	Asenso Manileño	48,260	45.35
Richard M. Bautista	Independent	695	0.65
Jose P. Castillo	Independent	623	0.59
Total		106,422	100.00

== Marikina ==
=== 1st District ===
Candidate	Party	Votes	%
Bayani Fernando	Nationalist People's Coalition	43,127	56.57
Samuel S. Ferriol	Liberal Party	29,619	38.85
Joseph Peter S. Sison	Independent	3,490	4.58
Total		76,236	100.00

=== 2nd District ===
Candidate	Party	Votes	%
Romero Federico S. Quimbo	Liberal Party	85,915	100.00
Total		85,915	100.00

== Marinduque ==
Candidate	Party	Votes	%
Lord Allan Jay Q. Velasco	National Unity Party	60,759	55.23
Regina Reyes Mandanas	Liberal Party	49,252	44.77
Total		110,011	100.00

== Masbate ==
=== 1st District ===
Candidate	Party	Votes	%
Ma. Vida Espinosa-Bravo	National Unity Party	46,026	78.05
Ciceron Altarejos	Nacionalista Party	12,947	21.95
Total		58,973	100.00

=== 2nd District ===
Candidate	Party	Votes	%
Elisa Olga T. Kho	Nacionalista Party	61,182	45.21
Vicente Homer Revil	National Unity Party	48,487	35.83
Darius M. Tuason Sr	Nationalist People's Coalition	25,671	18.97
Total		135,340	100.00

=== 3rd District ===
Candidate	Party	Votes	%
Scott Davies S. Lanete	Nationalist People's Coalition	63,684	56.66
Wilton Kho	Nacionalista Party	48,722	43.34
Total		112,406	100.00

== Misamis Occidental ==
=== 1st District ===
Candidate	Party	Votes	%
Jorge T. Almonte	Liberal Party	83,501	69.37
Marina P. Clarete	Nacionalista Party	36,868	30.63
Total		120,369	100.00

=== 2nd District ===
Candidate	Party	Votes	%
Henry S. Oaminal Sr	Nacionalista Party	115,833	100.00
Total		115,833	100.00

== Misamis Oriental ==
=== 1st District ===
Candidate	Party	Votes	%
Peter Unabia	Liberal Party	117,027	70.12
Reynaldo Moreno	Padayun Misamis	48,367	28.98
Rommel S. Zagado	Lapiang Manggagawa	1,495	0.90
Total		166,889	100.00

=== 2nd District ===
Candidate	Party	Votes	%
Juliette Uy	National Unity Party	139,830	62.97
Augusto H. Baculio Jr	Padayun Misamis	79,392	35.75
Manuel Po	Independent	2,833	1.28
Total		222,055	100.00

== Mountain Province ==
Candidate	Party	Votes	%
Maximo B. Dalog Sr	Liberal Party	63,629	100.00
Total		63,629	100.00

== Muntinlupa ==
Candidate	Party	Votes	%
Rozzano Rufino B. Biazon	Liberal Party	135,472	66.09
Ronald N. Ricketts	United Nationalist Alliance	69,508	33.91
Total		204,980	100.00

== Navotas ==
Candidate	Party	Votes	%
Tobias Reynald M. Tiangco	United Nationalist Alliance	84,550	95.67
Dong Luna	Independent	3,827	4.33
Total		88,377	100.00

== Negros Occidental ==
=== 1st District ===
Candidate	Party	Votes	%
Melecio J. Yap Jr	Nationalist People's Coalition	93,695	66.27
Santiago Maravillas	Liberal Party	44,298	31.33
Ernesto L. Librando	Kilusang Bagong Lipunan	3,388	2.40
Total		141,381	100.00

=== 2nd District ===
Candidate	Party	Votes	%
Leo Rafael M. Cueva	National Unity Party/United Negros Alliance	78,611	100.00
Total		78,611	100.00

=== 3rd District ===
Candidate	Party	Votes	%
Alfredo Abelardo B. Benitez	Independent	177,232	90.37
Gerard Anthony Puey	National Unity Party	13,393	6.83
Antonio Barello Jr	Independent	5,488	2.80
Total		196,113	100.00

=== 4th District ===
Candidate	Party	Votes	%
Juliet Marie B. de Leon-Ferrer	National Unity Party/United Negros Alliance	134,580	97.00
Enrique C. Erobas	Independent	4,159	3.00
Total		138,739	100.00

=== 5th District ===
Candidate	Party	Votes	%
Alejandro Mirasol	Liberal Party	88,897	50.93
Emilio Bernardino L. Yulo III	Nacionalista Party	85,638	49.07
Total		174,535	100.00

=== 6th District ===
Candidate	Party	Votes	%
Mercedes Alvarez–Lansang	Nationalist People's Coalition	129,619	100.00
Total		129,619	100.00

== Negros Oriental ==
=== 1st District ===
Candidate	Party	Votes	%
Jocelyn Sy-Limkaichong	Liberal Party	94,800	60.55
Jacinto Paras	National Unity Party	60,506	38.65
Danilo C. Roble	Independent	1,252	0.80
Total		156,558	100.00

=== 2nd District ===
Candidate	Party	Votes	%
Manuel T. Sagarbarria Sr	Nationalist People's Coalition	75,077	37.89
Ismail M. Amolat	Independent	72,548	36.62
Erwin Michael Macias	National Unity Party	46,936	23.69
Ryan B. Ybañez	Independent	2,060	1.04
Samuel Torres	Independent	1,498	0.76
Total		198,119	100.00

=== 3rd District ===
Candidate	Party	Votes	%
Arnolfo A. Teves Jr	Nationalist People's Coalition	81,768	55.82
Henry Sojor	Independent	61,677	42.11
Ivy Marie Pergamino	United Nationalist Alliance	3,032	2.07
Total		146,477	100.00

== Northern Samar ==
=== 1st District ===
Candidate	Party	Votes	%
Raul Daza	Liberal Party	80,157	50.01
Harlin C. Abayon Jr	Nacionalista Party	80,110	49.99
Total		160,267	100.00

=== 2nd District ===
Candidate	Party	Votes	%
Edwin Ongchuan	National Unity Party	67,653	100.00
Total		67,653	100.00

== Nueva Ecija ==
=== 1st District ===
Candidate	Party	Votes	%
Estrellita B. Suansing	Liberal Party/Unang Sigaw	145,685	64.98
Josefina M. Joson	United Nationalist Alliance/BALANE	78,512	35.02
Total		224,197	100.00

=== 2nd District ===
Candidate	Party	Votes	%
Micaela O. Salvador-Violago	Liberal Party	122,470	58.56
Joselito F. Violago	Nacionalista Party	86,674	41.44
Total		209,144	100.00

=== 3rd District ===
Candidate	Party	Votes	%
Rosanna Vergara	Nationalist People's Coalition	133,256	50.34
Aurelio Umali	Liberal Party/Unang Sigaw	130,677	49.36
Gaudencio Castro	Independent	804	0.30
Total		264,737	100.00

=== 4th District ===
Candidate	Party	Votes	%
Magnolia Rosa C. Antonino-Nadres	United Nationalist Alliance/BALANE	159,299	66.73
Napoleon G. Interior	Liberal Party/Unang Sigaw	69,916	29.29
Virgilio Bote	Independent	6,874	2.88
Montano Cayanan	Independent	2,626	1.10
Total		238,715	100.00

== Nueva Vizcaya ==
Candidate	Party	Votes	%
Luisa Cuaresma	United Nationalist Alliance	84,616	44.56
Ruth R. Padilla	Nacionalista Party	84,217	44.35
Donna Lyn Gerdan	Liberal Party	20,449	10.77
Lawrence S. Sta. Ana	Independent	631	0.33
Total		189,913	100.00

== Occidental Mindoro ==
Candidate	Party	Votes	%
Josephine Y. Ramirez-Sato	Liberal Party	142,551	83.93
Damaso A. Malabanan	United Nationalist Alliance	20,748	12.22
Thomas Ledesma	Independent	6,556	3.86
Total		169,855	100.00

== Oriental Mindoro ==
=== 1st District ===
Candidate	Party	Votes	%
Paulino Salvador Leachon	Liberal Party	113,908	61.09
Joel Teves	United Nationalist Alliance	72,539	38.91
Total		186,447	100.00

=== 2nd District ===
Candidate	Party	Votes	%
Reynaldo Umali	Liberal Party	102,429	82.92
Mylene Morante	Independent	21,102	17.08
Total		123,531	100.00

== Palawan ==
=== 1st District ===
Candidate	Party	Votes	%
Franz Josef George E. Alvarez	National Unity Party/PPP	112,165	76.41
Mariano Parangue	Independent	34,632	23.59
Total		146,797	100.00

=== 2nd District ===
Candidate	Party	Votes	%
Frederick Abueg	Liberal Party	94,860	100.00
Total		94,860	100.00

=== 3rd District ===
Candidate	Party	Votes	%
Gil P. Acosta Sr	Nationalist People's Coalition	55,068	49.32
Douglas S. Hagedorn	Liberal Party	51,993	46.57
Cil Acosta	Independent	4,592	4.11
Total		111,653	100.00

== Pampanga ==
=== 1st District ===
Candidate	Party	Votes	%
Carmelo Lazatin II	Lingap Lugud	127,762	53.94
Joseller M. Guiao	Liberal Party	106,086	44.78
Edwin Bacay	Independent	1,828	0.77
Juan Pagaran	Independent	1,203	0.51
Total		236,879	100.00

=== 2nd District ===
Candidate	Party	Votes	%
Ma. Gloria M. Macapagal-Arroyo	Lakas–CMD	190,631	100.00
Total		190,631	100.00

=== 3rd District ===
Candidate	Party	Votes	%
Aurelio Gonzales Jr.	Nationalist People's Coalition	137,786	51.40
Oscar Samson Rodriguez	Liberal Party	123,935	46.24
Jose D. Quiwa III	Independent	3,260	1.22
Amado L. Santos	Independent	3,069	1.14
Total		268,050	100.00

=== 4th District ===
Candidate	Party	Votes	%
Juan Pablo Bondoc	Nacionalista Party	148,641	63.44
Oscar Tetangco Jr	Nationalist People's Coalition	85,643	36.56
Total		234,284	100.00

== Pangasinan ==
=== 1st District ===
Candidate	Party	Votes	%
Jesus F. Celeste	Nationalist People's Coalition	147,273	87.03
Wilmer Panabang	Liberal Party	18,799	11.11
Paul Tucay	Kilusang Bagong Lipunan	3,140	1.86
Total		169,212	100.00

=== 2nd District ===
Candidate	Party	Votes	%
Leopoldo N. Bataoil	Liberal Party	172,078	100.00
Total		172,078	100.00

=== 3rd District ===
Candidate	Party	Votes	%
Rose Marie B. Jimenez-Arenas	Liberal Party	192,831	71.66
Generoso C. Tulagan Sr	Kilusang Bagong Lipunan	53,844	20.01
Eric Galo V. Acuña	PDP–Laban	22,404	8.33
Total		269,079	100.00

=== 4th District ===
Candidate	Party	Votes	%
Christopher George Martin P. de Venecia	Liberal Party	172,089	91.72
Angel Aquino	Independent	6,525	3.48
Arvin de Guzman	Independent	4,829	2.57
Mario Operaña	Independent	2,293	1.22
Ronaldo Ebreo	Independent	1,897	1.01
Total		187,633	100.00

=== 5th District ===
Candidate	Party	Votes	%
Amado Espino Jr.	Aksyon Demokratiko	133,381	58.93
Ma. Carmen S. Cojuangco	Nationalist People's Coalition	92,943	41.07
Total		226,324	100.00

=== 6th District ===
Candidate	Party	Votes	%
Marlyn Primicias-Agabas	Nationalist People's Coalition	183,175	100.00
Total		183,175	100.00

== Parañaque ==
=== 1st District ===
Candidate	Party	Votes	%
Eric Olivarez	Liberal Party	79,760	73.57
Vicente R. Celeridad Jr	United Nationalist Alliance	28,651	26.43
Total		108,411	100.00

=== 2nd District ===
Candidate	Party	Votes	%
Gustavo Alonzo S. Tambunting	United Nationalist Alliance	64,545	50.59
Jose Roilo S. Golez	Independent	61,493	48.20
Pacifico C. Rosal	Independent	881	0.69
Pedro C. Montaño	Lakas–CMD	666	0.52
Total		127,585	100.00

== Pasay ==
Candidate	Party	Votes	%
Imelda G. Calixto-Rubiano	Liberal Party	140,774	80.51
Santiago C. Quial	Independent	30,890	17.67
Jose Allan M. Tebelin	Independent	1,929	1.10
Deogracias Laguipo	Independent	1,265	0.72
Total		174,858	100.00

== Pasig ==
Candidate	Party	Votes	%
Richard C. Eusebio	Nacionalista Party	145,677	47.95
Christian G. Sia	Liberal Party	87,711	28.87
Montserrat T. Romulo-Tantoco	Nationalist People's Coalition	70,392	23.17
Total		303,780	100.00

== Quezon ==
=== 1st District ===
Candidate	Party	Votes	%
Anna Katrina M. Enverga-de la Paz	Nationalist People's Coalition	90,306	43.29
Irvin M. Alcala	Liberal Party	86,376	41.41
Teresita Dator	United Nationalist Alliance	26,126	12.53
Carlos Portes	PDP–Laban	5,775	2.77
Total		208,583	100.00

=== 2nd District ===
Candidate	Party	Votes	%
Vicente J. Alcala	Liberal Party	175,273	64.44
Rosauro V. Masilang	Independent	86,161	31.68
Vivencio Escueta	Independent	10,549	3.88
Total		271,983	100.00

=== 3rd District ===
Candidate	Party	Votes	%
Danilo Suarez	United Nationalist Alliance	124,963	100.00
Total		124,963	100.00

=== 4th District ===
Candidate	Party	Votes	%
Angelina Tan	Nationalist People's Coalition	127,590	69.94
Lorenzo R. Tañada III	Liberal Party	53,101	29.11
Armando Mendoza	Independent	1,537	0.84
Marcil Guay	Lapiang Manggagawa	203	0.11
Total		182,431	100.00

== Quezon City ==
=== 1st District ===
Candidate	Party	Votes	%
Vincent Crisologo	United Nationalist Alliance	81,799	58.91
Francisco A. Calalay Jr	Liberal Party	57,056	41.09
Total		138,855	100.00

=== 2nd District ===
Candidate	Party	Votes	%
Winston T. Castelo	Liberal Party	172,001	100.00
Total		172,001	100.00

=== 3rd District ===
Candidate	Party	Votes	%
Jorge John B. Banal Jr	Liberal Party	79,579	100.00
Total		79,579	100.00

=== 4th District ===
Candidate	Party	Votes	%
Feliciano Belmonte Jr.	Liberal Party	115,007	91.37
Albert Hans C. Palacios	Independent	6,900	5.48
Hadja Lorna Aquino	Independent	3,961	3.15
Total		125,868	100.00

=== 5th District ===
Candidate	Party	Votes	%
Alfredo Paolo D. Vargas III	Liberal Party	134,946	100.00
Total		134,946	100.00

=== 6th District ===
Candidate	Party	Votes	%
Jose Christopher Y. Belmonte	Liberal Party	102,171	100.00
Total		102,171	100.00

== Quirino ==
Candidate	Party	Votes	%
Dakila Carlo E. Cua	Liberal Party	68,356	100.00
Total		68,356	100.00

== Rizal ==
=== 1st District ===
Candidate	Party	Votes	%
Michael John R. Duavit	Nationalist People's Coalition	246,141	82.63
Avelino Zapanta	Liberal Party	24,543	8.24
Wilfrido C. Naval	PDP–Laban	13,741	4.61
Titus T. Perez	Partido Bagong Maharlika	8,825	2.96
Jerry D. Barbacena	Independent	4,635	1.56
Total		297,885	100.00

=== 2nd District ===
Candidate	Party	Votes	%
Isidro S. Rodriguez Jr	Nationalist People's Coalition	220,209	77.72
Luisa Ayuson	Pwersa ng Masang Pilipino	38,969	13.75
Omar Mohammad Fajardo	Liberal Party	19,792	6.99
Said Usman	Nacionalista Party	4,372	1.54
Total		283,342	100.00

== Romblon ==
Candidate	Party	Votes	%
Emmanuel F. Madrona	Nacionalista Party	57,483	44.90
Robert M. Fabella	Independent	57,228	44.70
Jose Madrid	United Nationalist Alliance	13,307	10.39
Total		128,018	100.00

== Samar ==
=== 1st District ===
Candidate	Party	Votes	%
Edgar Mary Sarmiento	Liberal Party	86,115	51.86
Raymund C. Uy	Nacionalista Party	77,548	46.70
Irma Sarmiento	Independent	2,401	1.45
Total		166,064	100.00

=== 2nd District ===
Candidate	Party	Votes	%
Milagrosa Tan	Nationalist People's Coalition	137,248	69.16
Myrna Ojeda-Tan	Liberal Party	61,189	30.84
Total		198,437	100.00

== San Jose del Monte ==
Candidate	Party	Votes	%
Florida Robes	Arangkada San Joseño	83,945	52.58
Eduardo S. Roquero Jr	Liberal Party	75,692	47.42
Total		159,637	100.00

== San Juan City ==
Candidate	Party	Votes	%
Ronaldo Zamora	Nacionalista Party	31,172	56.63
Jannah A. Ejercito	Pwersa ng Masang Pilipino	22,922	41.64
George Cordero	Independent	952	1.73
Total		55,046	100.00

== Sarangani ==
Candidate	Party	Votes	%
Rogelio Pacquiao	United Nationalist Alliance/PCM	142,307	86.10
Elson O. Formoso	Independent	13,938	8.43
Megie Ramos-Orig	Nationalist People's Coalition	6,306	3.82
Victor Mejia	Kilusang Bagong Lipunan	2,731	1.65
Total		165,282	100.00

== Siquijor ==
Candidate	Party	Votes	%
Ramon Vicente Antonio M. Rocamora	Independent	22,125	40.61
Marie Anne S. Pernes	Liberal Party	18,216	33.44
Orlando A. Fua Jr	United Nationalist Alliance	9,695	17.80
Carl Mark Ganhinhin	Independent	4,439	8.15
Total		54,475	100.00

== Sorsogon ==
=== 1st District ===
Candidate	Party	Votes	%
Evelina B. Guevara-Escudero	Nationalist People's Coalition	116,069	100.00
Total		116,069	100.00

=== 2nd District ===
Candidate	Party	Votes	%
Deogracias B. Ramos Jr	Liberal Party	111,608	70.35
Eduardo Ong Jr	PDP–Laban	47,040	29.65
Total		158,648	100.00

== South Cotabato ==
=== 1st District ===
Candidate	Party	Votes	%
Pedro B. Acharon Jr	Nationalist People's Coalition	173,255	60.07
Ryan Rivera	Kilusang Bagong Lipunan	115,149	39.93
Total		288,404	100.00

=== 2nd District ===
Candidate	Party	Votes	%
Ferdinand L. Hernandez	Nationalist People's Coalition	142,817	62.45
Arthur Y. Pingoy Jr	Independent	85,883	37.55
Total		228,700	100.00

== Southern Leyte ==
=== 1st District ===
Candidate	Party	Votes	%
Roger Mercado	Liberal Party	123,806	65.23
Rico C. Rentuza	United Nationalist Alliance	65,998	34.77
Total		189,804	100.00

== Sultan Kudarat ==
=== 1st District ===
Candidate	Party	Votes	%
Suharto Mangudadatu	Partidong Tinig ng Masa	92,385	74.52
Carlos L. Valdez Jr	Liberal Party	31,583	25.48
Total		123,968	100.00

=== 2nd District ===
Candidate	Party	Votes	%
Horacio P. Suansing Jr	Liberal Party	39,042	35.13
Kahirup C. Ang	Partidong Tinig ng Masa	38,090	34.28
Amelia Go	National Unity Party	32,893	29.60
Freiding Alejaga	Independent	1,099	0.99
Total		111,124	100.00

== Sulu ==
=== 1st District ===
Candidate	Party	Votes	%
Habib Tupay T. Loong	National Unity Party	85,547	66.82
Saripuddin D. Jikiri	PDP–Laban	42,475	33.18
Total		128,022	100.00

=== 2nd District ===
Candidate	Party	Votes	%
Abdulmunir Arbison Sr.	Liberal Party	40,569	68.19
Nur-Ana Sahidulla	PDP–Laban	18,922	31.81
Total		59,491	100.00

== Surigao del Norte ==
=== 1st District ===
Candidate	Party	Votes	%
Francisco Jose Matugas II	Liberal Party	30,397	66.58
Constantino L. Navarro III	Nacionalista Party	14,984	32.82
Lanelyn D. Pangilinan	United Nationalist Alliance	271	0.59
Total		45,652	100.00

=== 2nd District ===
Candidate	Party	Votes	%
Robert Ace S. Barbers	Nacionalista Party	104,877	60.86
Mary Ann Lucille Sering	Liberal Party	67,459	39.14
Total		172,336	100.00

== Surigao del Sur ==
=== 1st District ===
Candidate	Party	Votes	%
Prospero Pichay Jr.	Lakas–CMD	64,755	58.48
Gregorio T. Murillo Jr	PDP–Laban	45,967	41.52
Total		110,722	100.00

=== 2nd District ===
Candidate	Party	Votes	%
Johnny Pimentel	Liberal Party	37,080	55.20
Conrad Cejoco	United Nationalist Alliance	30,088	44.80
Total		67,168	100.00

== Taguig ==
Candidate	Party	Votes	%
Arnel Cerafica	Liberal Party/Kilusang Diwa ng Taguig	81,143	89.22
Gloria G. Cabrera	Partido Bagong Maharlika	9,804	10.78
Total		90,947	100.00

== Taguig–Pateros ==
Candidate	Party	Votes	%
Pilar Juliana S. Cayetano	Nacionalista Party	93,813	69.38
Michelle Anne B. Gonzales	United Nationalist Alliance	41,396	30.62
Total		135,209	100.00

== Tarlac ==
=== 1st District ===
Candidate	Party	Votes	%
Carlos O. Cojuangco	Nationalist People's Coalition	151,199	95.06
Cristino Diamsay	Independent	7,859	4.94
Total		159,058	100.00

=== 2nd District ===
Candidate	Party	Votes	%
Victor Yap	Nationalist People's Coalition	165,982	79.72
Florentino Galang	Pwersa ng Masang Pilipino	40,685	19.54
Joseph Doloricon	Independent	1,543	0.74
Total		208,210	100.00

=== 3rd District ===
Candidate	Party	Votes	%
Noel L. Villanueva	Nationalist People's Coalition	130,611	100.00
Total		130,611	100.00

== Tawi-Tawi ==
Candidate	Party	Votes	%
Ruby Sahali	Liberal Party	69,614	51.26
Myrna C. Ajihil	National Unity Party	66,187	48.74
Total		135,801	100.00

== Valenzuela ==
=== 1st District ===
Candidate	Party	Votes	%
Weslie T. Gatchalian	Nationalist People's Coalition	92,541	80.38
Ritche D. Cuadra	Liberal Party	22,246	19.32
Victor Reponia	Partido Bagong Maharlika	336	0.29
Total		115,123	100.00

=== 2nd District ===
Candidate	Party	Votes	%
Eric Martinez	PDP–Laban	86,069	66.15
Adelma Yang-Gunigundo	Liberal Party	44,045	33.85
Total		130,114	100.00

== Zambales ==
=== 1st District ===
Candidate	Party	Votes	%
Jeffrey D. Khonghun	Liberal Party	146,773	92.54
Michael Macapagal	PDP–Laban	11,832	7.46
Total		158,605	100.00

=== 2nd District ===
Candidate	Party	Votes	%
Cheryl P. Deloso-Montalla	Liberal Party	127,961	70.94
Reinhard Jeresano	Sulong Zambales Party	52,415	29.06
Total		180,376	100.00

== Zamboanga City ==
=== 1st District ===
Candidate	Party	Votes	%
Celso Lobregat	Laban ng Demokratikong Pilipino	62,218	52.21
Crisanto B. de la Cruz	Nationalist People's Coalition	36,150	30.33
Cesar F. Climaco Jr	Independent	15,540	13.04
Abdulbasir Yasin Tamsilani	Independent	2,881	2.42
Taib H. Nasaron	PDP–Laban	1,872	1.57
Elmer Pangan	Independent	372	0.31
Anito Tilos	Partido Bagong Maharlika	145	0.12
Total		119,178	100.00

=== 2nd District ===
Candidate	Party	Votes	%
Manuel Jose M. Dalipe	Nationalist People's Coalition	69,100	55.48
Lilia M. Nuño	Nacionalista Party	48,497	38.94
Abdul Karim Ladjamatli	PDP–Laban	3,983	3.20
Abu Bakar Barahama	Partido Bagong Maharlika	2,973	2.39
Total		124,553	100.00

== Zamboanga del Norte ==
=== 1st District ===
Candidate	Party	Votes	%
Seth Frederick P. Jalosjos	Nacionalista Party	56,425	53.13
Lester Ong	Liberal Party	39,405	37.10
Vicente Edgar A. Balisado	National Unity Party	10,378	9.77
Total		106,208	100.00

=== 2nd District ===
Candidate	Party	Votes	%
Glona Labadlabad	Nacionalista Party	119,854	76.54
Gilbert Cruz	Liberal Party	36,746	23.46
Total		156,600	100.00

=== 3rd District ===
Candidate	Party	Votes	%
Isagani Amatong	Liberal Party	87,727	65.20
Cesar G. Jalosjos	Nacionalista Party	42,452	31.55
Ednu-Sajar Hambali	Independent	2,656	1.97
Joshua Baroro	Independent	1,068	0.79
Popoy Tumagidgid	Independent	657	0.49
Total		134,560	100.00

== Zamboanga del Sur ==
=== 1st District ===
Candidate	Party	Votes	%
Divina Grace Yu	Nationalist People's Coalition	180,705	83.00
Alex Acain	National Unity Party	37,000	17.00
Total		217,705	100.00

=== 2nd District ===
Candidate	Party	Votes	%
Aurora C. Enerio-Cerilles	Nationalist People's Coalition	117,658	92.31
James Yecyec	Aksyon Demokratiko	9,805	7.69
Total		127,463	100.00

== Zamboanga Sibugay ==
=== 1st District ===
Candidate	Party	Votes	%
Wilter Palma II	Liberal Party	49,342	52.61
Belma Cabilao	Nacionalista Party	42,417	45.23
Omar B. Karim	Kilusang Bagong Lipunan	1,241	1.32
Eric Dalis	Independent	412	0.44
Reynaldo N. Tecechian	Independent	371	0.40
Total		93,783	100.00

=== 2nd District ===
Candidate	Party	Votes	%
Dulce Ann K. Hofer-Santos	Liberal Party	119,175	94.42
Edgar Alegre	PDP–Laban	7,043	5.58
Total		126,218	100.00
