= Henry Sojor =

Henry A. Sojor is the former president (first university president) of Negros Oriental State University (formerly Central Visayas Polytechnic College - CVPC) Main Campuses I & II, Dumaguete City; Pamplona Farm; Bais City Campuses I & II; Guihulngan City; Mabinay Campus Siaton Campus; Sta. Catalina-Bayawan Campus;

Former OIC president, Jose Rizal Memorial State University (former JRMSC) The State University in Zamboanga del Nortest.

First graduate, Doctor of Philosophy (Ph.D.), Silliman University, (1977); Fellow, International Advisory Council, Royal Institute of Education, Singapore.
