= Jose Rizal Memorial State University =

Public university in Zamboanga del Norte, Philippines

- Pag-alaalang Pamantasang Pampamahalaan Jose Rizal (Filipino)
- Former name: Jose Rizal Memorial State College (before 2010)
- Type: State university
- Established: 2010 (university)
- Affiliations: PASUC-SCUAA—MASCUF
- President: Dr. Maria Rio A. Naguit
- Vice-president: Dr. Reynaldo M. Venezuela (Administration); Dr. Jay D. Telen (Academic Affairs); Dr. Rizza B. Bagalanon (Research, Development & Extension); Dr. Joseph Salvel R. Campiseño (External Affairs, Linkages & Resource Generation); Atty. Nizza P. Lesterio-Absin (Finance)
- Students: 4,700
- Location: Gov. Guading Adaza Street, Santa Cruz, Dapitan, Zamboanga del Norte, 7100, Philippines; 8.656389°N 123.422778°E
- Campus: *Dipolog Campus (General Luna Street, Turno, Dipolog); Katipunan Campus (National Highway, Barangay Dos, Katipunan, Zamboanga del Norte); Tampilisan Campus (Z.N.A.C. Road, Tampilisan, Zamboanga del Norte); Siocon Campus (Siocon, Zamboanga del Norte); Sibuco External Studies Unit (Sibuco, Zamboanga del Norte)
- Newspaper: The State Collegian
- Colors: Navy Blue and Gold
- Nickname: JRMSU
- Website: jrmsu.edu.ph

Jose Rizal Memorial State University (JRMSU; Filipino: Pag-alaalang Pamantasang Pampamahalaan Jose Rizal) is a provincial state university with its network of universities located in the province of Zamboanga del Norte, Philippines. It operates multiple campuses, with its main campus in Dapitan.

It is mandated to provide higher professional, technical, special instructions for special purposes and promote research and extension services, advanced studies and progressive leadership in education, agriculture, arts and sciences, engineering and other fields. Its main campus is located in Dapitan. It became a university in 2010 by virtue of Republic Act 9852.

== History ==
Jose Rizal Memorial State University was established by virtue of RA 9852 with Congresswoman Cecilia G. Jalosjos-Carreon as principal author, Congressman Cesar Jalosjos as co-author. It was approved by President Gloria Macapagal Arroyo on December 15, 2009. It was formerly the Jose Rizal Memorial State College by virtue of Republic Act 8193 sponsored by Congressman Romeo G. Jalosjos of the 1st District of Zamboanga del Norte which was approved on June 11, 1996, by the President of the Republic, Fidel V. Ramos.

It was a consolidation of the Rizal Memorial Vocational School (RMNVS) in Dapitan, the Zamboanga del Norte School of Arts and Trades (ZNSAT) in Dipolog which was formed in 1961, and the Siocon National Vocational School (SNVS) in the municipality of Siocon, Zamboanga del Norte.

In 2002, two higher education institutions (HEIs) within Zamboanga del Norte, namely the Katipunan National Agricultural School (KNAS) in the municipality of Katipunan, Zamboanga del Norte and the Zamboanga del Norte Agricultural College (ZNAC) in the Municipality of Tampilisan, Zamboanga del Norte (which was then a part of the Western Mindanao State University system), were integrated into then JRMSC pursuant to CHED Memorandum Order No. 27 series of 2000 thus comprising the fourth and fifth campuses, respectively of JRMSU.

The first president was Dr. Felipe O. Ligan, who was appointed in 1997. On June 7, 2002, CHED Special Order No. 35, s. 2002 appointed Dr. Henry A. Sojor as the OIC President of the Jose Rizal Memorial State College in concurrent capacity as president of Central Visayas Polytechnic College in Dumaguete, now Negros Oriental State University.

In the span of two years and eight months, the board of trustees then deemed it best for the college to have its permanent leader. Thus, on March 1, 2005, Dr. Edgar S. Balbuena assumed office as the second president of JRMSC pursuant to BOT Resolution No. 4, series of 2005 chaired by Fr. Rolando V. Rosa, OP.

== Campuses ==
- Main Campus: Dapitan, Zamboanga del Norte
- Dipolog, Zamboanga del Norte
- Katipunan, Zamboanga del Norte
- Tampilisan, Zamboanga del Norte
- Siocon, Zamboanga del Norte
- Sibuco, Zamboanga del Norte - External Studies Unit

== Campus life ==
Jose Rizal Memorial State University Hymn (shortened as JRMSU Hymn) is the official hymn of the Jose Rizal Memorial State University . The hymn was composed by Wilfredo D. Carreon Jr., while its melody was arranged by Earl John Lapore.
