= Negros Oriental State University =

Public university in Negros Oriental, Philippines

- Pamantasang Pampamahalaan ng Negros Oriental (Filipino)
- Former names: Negros Oriental Provincial School (1907–1927); Negros Oriental Trade School (1927-1956); East Visayan School of Arts and Trades (1956-1983); Central Visayas Polytechnic College (1983-2004)
- Motto: Our Pride, Our Hope, Our Future
- Type: Public state university, research, non-profit, coeducational higher education institution
- Established: 2004; 22 years ago (as NORSU)
- Academic affiliations: AACUP, PASUC
- President: Noel Marjon E. Yasi, Psy.D.
- Vice-president: Dr. Merivic G. Catada (Administration & Finance); Dr. Libertine C. de Guzman (Academic Affairs); Dr. Edwin F. Romano, Jr. (Research, Development & Extension; Dr. Cesar P. Estrope (Acting, Student Affairs & Services)
- Faculty: 334
- Undergraduates: 32,098
- Postgraduates: 770
- Doctoral students: 109
- Location: Kagawasan Avenue, Dumaguete, Negros Oriental, Philippines; 9°18′43″N 123°18′12″E
- Campus: Urban Main: I & II (Bajumpandan) Satellite; Mabinay Campus; Bais Campuses I & II; Guihulngan Campus; Siaton Campus; Bayawan-Sta. Catalina Campus Extension Pamplona Campus
- Colors: Blue and White
- Nickname: NOrSUnian
- Mascot: NOrSU Blue Dolphins
- Website: norsu.edu.ph
- Location in the Visayas Location in the Philippines

Negros Oriental State University (NOrSU) is a public, nonsectarian higher education institution in Dumaguete City, Philippines. Established in 2004 through Republic Act No. 9299, it is the sole state university in the province of Negros Oriental.

The university's Main Campus, situated along Kagawasan Avenue beside the Negros Oriental Provincial Capitol, offers the widest array of academic programs and student organizations among all NORSU campuses.

Formerly known as Central Visayas Polytechnic College (CVPC), the institution was elevated to university status to serve a broader student population from the Visayas and Mindanao. Today, NORSU operates seven satellite campuses and one extension campus across the province, expanding access to quality education throughout the province.

== History ==
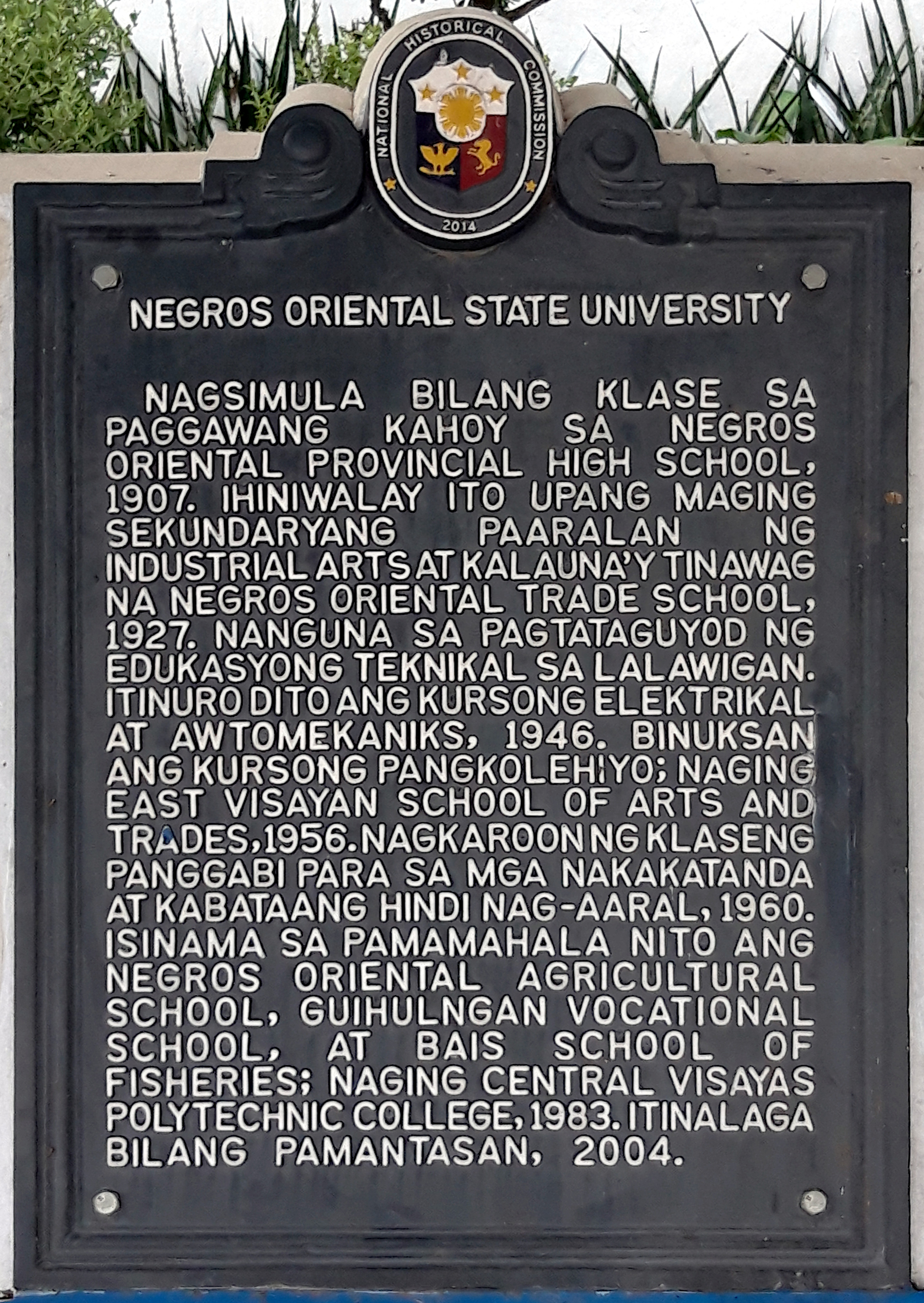
NORSU historical marker

The beginnings of what is now the Negros Oriental State University date back to 1907, from a single woodworking class at what was then the Negros Oriental Provincial School, the forerunner of the present Negros Oriental High School. As more industrial art subjects were added, a separate arts and trade school on the secondary level called the Negros Oriental Trade School, which became the East Visayan School of Arts and Trades in 1956 and the Central Visayas Polytechnic College in 1983. In 2004, it was converted into what is now the Negros Oriental State University.

=== The Negros Oriental Provincial School ===
The Negros Oriental Provincial High School was the precursor of what is now the Negros Oriental High School. It opened in Dumaguete on September 1, 1902. The "Provincial School," as it was simply referred to before, arose at the time when the principal stress in the program of public instruction of the American Civil Government in the Philippines was simply the introduction of the most basic academic program at the elementary and secondary levels. It was one of the 23 high schools in the country at that time.

1907 The school was started as a small shop on the intermediate level (fifth grade). It was located on the City Hall ground and was adjunct to the provincial schools which had both intermediate and high school classes. Mr. Leonard Brendenstein, a foreigner, was in charge of the school and woodworking was the only course offered at that time. 1916 Mr. Candido Alcazar became the principal of the school and the only course offered was still woodworking. The sixth and seventh grades were opened and conducted in the same small shop. 1922 Mr. Teodoro Senador Sr. took over as principal with Miss Salud Blanco, Mr. Estanislao Alviola Sr. and Mr. Fermin Canlas as teachers. There were at that time 258 intermediate pupils.

The curriculum offered by the Provincial School included English, reading, grammar, composition, arithmetic, geography, US history, and spelling. There was also a sewing class, which served as prototype of the vocational arts and trades education in the public schools in the province.

=== The Negros Oriental Trade School (NOTS) ===
The Negros Oriental Trade School (NOTS) was ordered to be created on December 3, 1927, by virtue of Act No. 3377 of the Philippine Legislature. The school was officially named NEGROS ORIENTAL TRADE SCHOOL (NOTS) and became a separate trade school on the secondary level to stress the promotion of education in trades and industries.

In July 1928, with Mr. Flaviano Santos as Principal, the first year class has 25 students. Though it was already considered as a separate institution, its students, however, continued to take their academic courses in English and Mathematics at the Negros Oriental Provincial High School.

With the growth in size of the Negros Oriental Trade School, it became imperative to have its own campus. Thus on July 26, 1930, Mr. Paul Wittman, the Division Superintendent of Schools for Negros Oriental, petitioned the Governor-General Henry Dwight F. Davis to reserve for the future campus of the Negros Oriental Trade School a piece of property adjoining the Catholic town cemetery, which lay at what was then the outskirts of Dumaguete.

In 1930 Mr. Flaviano Santos continued to be the principal with two sections of the First year and one section of the Second year. Mr. Fermin Canlas taught drawing and Mr. Estanislao Alviola Sr. taught shopwork. Building Construction was introduced with woodworking as a course.

In 1932, NOTS was transferred from its premises at the ground floor of the Municipal Hall to its present campus. That same year, it conferred diplomas on its first 18 graduates. The trade school was transferred to the present site and 18 fourth year students were turned out as first graduates with Julian Abrasado and Sixto Dilicano as valedictorian and salutatorian respectively. Upon the transfer of Mr. Flaviano Santos, Mr. Isabelo Sarmiento assumed office as principal of the school. He served less than a year on account of his transfer to Bohol.

In 1933 Mr. Vicente Enrile took over the principalship of the school for a short time and he was later transferred to Zamboanga Trade School. A permanent L-shaped building costing more than P35,000.00 was constructed from national funds.

From 1934-1941 Mr. Vicente Macairan became the principal. Shop courses were housed in the concrete building and students took their academic subjects at the Negros Oriental High School. Mr. Simplicio Mamicpic headed the academic department. About 1938, Building Construction was offered as a course.

The members of class 1942 of NOTS were never to finish the school year. Like all other schools throughout the country, Negros Oriental Trade School was closed. Some of its male faculty and students rose to join the colors during the World War II.

The Negros Oriental Trade School campus was used by the US Army in 1945 as quarters for Japanese prisoners of war whom they captured. NOTS was then reopened in July 1946.

In 1946 Mr. Francisci Apilado took charge of the school when it reopened. Later Mr. Roberto Angeles became the principal of the school until his transfer to Agusan as Industrial Supervisor. Then Mr. Proceso Gabor became the principal. Electricity and Automechanics were new courses offered. Reparation machines were acquired from Leyte to augment the technical shop equipment.

In 1948 The Related Subjects building was constructed from provincial funds. The academic department was headed by Mr. Esperidion G. Heceta after the liberation. After serving for a year, Mr. Heceta was promoted as principal of Larena Sub-Provincial High School. Mr. Fermin C. Santos took over the headship of the department. In view of the BPS ruling that National (Insular) teachers be placed in the national schools, Mr. Santos was persuaded by the Division Superintendent of Schools to exchange places with Mr. Pedro S. Flores, a National (Insular) teacher of the Negros Oriental High School. Mr. Flores did not stay long in this capacity and Mr. Santos was called back to assume the position of the academic department head.

In 1950 Mr. Marcelo Bonilla headed the school as principal. The Girls Trade semi-permanent building was constructed. Courses for girls were offered for the first time and 24 girls enrolled. The total enrolment was 865 and there were 40 teachers. It became coeducational for the first time.

In 1951 the enrolment soared to 1476 and there were 311 girls and 1165 boys. The faculty and staff totaled 66.

From 1953-1955 under the PHILCUSA-FOA Program, equipment and supplies were given to the school. Some buildings were constructed under the foreign aid program. Equipment and machinery in the Machine Shop, Woodworking, and Sheet Metal were installed. The enrolment of the school further rose to 1943 in the school year 1954-55, and the personnel and the teachers totaled 84. Mr. Teodulfo Despojo was the principal when Mr. Marcelo Bonilla was promoted as Superintendent of Zamboanga School of Arts and Trades.

=== The East Visayan School of Arts and Trades (EVSAT) ===
By virtue of Republic Act No. 1579 signed into law on June 16, 1956, the Negros Oriental Trade School became the EAST VISAYAN SCHOOL OF ARTS AND TRADES (EVSAT). Under this new status, EVSAT was headed by a "Superintendent" with a "Principal" assisting him in administering the academic program of the school. The responsibility for the financial support of the school also shifted from the shoulders of the province of Negros Oriental to the national government. The most salient developments in the life of the school at this time included its rise in status to a collegiate level, the diversification of its technical curriculum, and the increase in buildings, machinery, and equipment. The implementation took effect during the school year 1957-58. Mr. Mariano P. Dagdag became the first Superintendent of the School and Mr. Julian A. Corpuz assumed office as principal of the school replacing Mr. Despojo who was transferred Agusan Trade School. Technical Education college courses like machine shop technology, electricity technology, technical drafting, technical building construction and girls trade technical courses were offered.

In 1957, during the administration of Mr. Mariano P. Dagdag, technical education courses on the collegiate level were offered for the first time. These included technical machine shop, technical building construction, technical automotive mechanics, and a number of girl's trades technical courses.

In 1959 Mr. Gregorio P. Espinosa took over as the second superintendent of the school on February 9, succeeding Mr. Dagdag upon his transferred.

In 1960, Evening Opportunity Classes were introduced for the first time, to make trade education accessible to adults and out-of-school youth, and in 1961, three other government schools in Negros Oriental were placed under the administration and supervision of EVSAT. These were the Negros Oriental National Agricultural School (NONAS) in Bayawan, the Guihulngan Vocational School in Guihulngan, and the Bais School of Fisheries in Bais City. To the three was subsequently added the Larena National Vocational School in Larena, Siquijor.

In 1965, EVSAT was authorized by virtue of Republic Act No. 4401 to offer a teacher education program leading to the degree of Bachelor of Science in Industrial Education. This raised EVSAT to the full status of a collegiate institution and pointed in a fresh direction which in time was to bring an entirely new character to the institution.

In 1975, new shop courses in Marine Engineering and Electronics, and Saturday classes in Practical Arts were offered for the first time. EVSAT was also authorized to offer a four-year technical educational program, leading to the degree of Bachelor of Science in Industrial Technology (BSIT), with a major in industrial management and supervision.

The need for candidates for the BSIE degree, major in industrial arts, for laboratory classes to do practice teaching led to MECS authorization in 1976 for EVSAT to open elementary classes at first in Grade V to VI. The full elementary school program began at the start of the new school year in June 1977. In later years, a high school was added as a second laboratory schools.

In 1976, EVSAT's graduate program was inaugurated, starting with the Master of Education degree.

=== The Central Visayas Polytechnic College ===
By virtue of Batas Pambansa No. 401 passed on April 14, 1983, and signed into law by President Ferdinand E. Marcos on June 10, 1983, the Central Visayas Polytechnic College came into being. The state college was the result of the merger of three government institutions in Negros Oriental, namely the East Visayan School of Arts and Trades in Dumaguete, the Bais School of Fisheries in Okiot, Bais, and the Guihulngan Vocational School in Guihulngan City, Negros Oriental.

In its educational task, the primary responsibility of the Central Visayas Polytechnic College was "to give professional and technical training in science and technology, advanced specialized instruction in literature, philosophy, arts and sciences, besides providing for the promotion of scientific and technological researchers." The State College was authorized to offer undergraduate courses in liberal arts, engineering, fisheries, agriculture, and short-term vocational courses for the development of middle-level skills. It was also authorized to offer graduate courses, after the passage of five years and at the discretion of its Board of Trustees."

On December 11, 1986, Atty. Marcelo C. Jalandoon was formally appointed as the first President of Central Visayas Polytechnic College. President Jalandoon's administration of CVPC encompassed the transition period after Martial Law. Philippine education was faced with the great challenge of responding to the need to stabilize the country's political situation by solidifying its economic foundations and fulfilling the expectations of a better life.

By 1991, with the solid foundation established by the earnest efforts of CVPC's previous administrators and the unflagging commitment to service of its faculty and staff, Dr. Henry A. Sojor was appointed by Philippine President Corazon C. Aquino on August 1, 1991, as the second President of the College. He took his oath of office five days later before the Secretary of the Department of Education, Culture and Sports, Dr. Isidro Carino.

=== Negros Oriental State University ===
Republic Act No. 9299 was signed by President Gloria Macapagal Arroyo on June 25, 2004, and the Central Visayas Polytechnic College (CVPC) was converted into a state university, now known as the Negros Oriental State University (NORSU), integrating therewith the Genaro Goñi Memorial College in the City of Bais, the Siaton Community College in the Municipality of Siaton, and the Mabinay Institute of Technology in the Municipality of Mabinay. And it is officially recognized by the Commission on Higher Education of the Philippines.

== Colleges ==
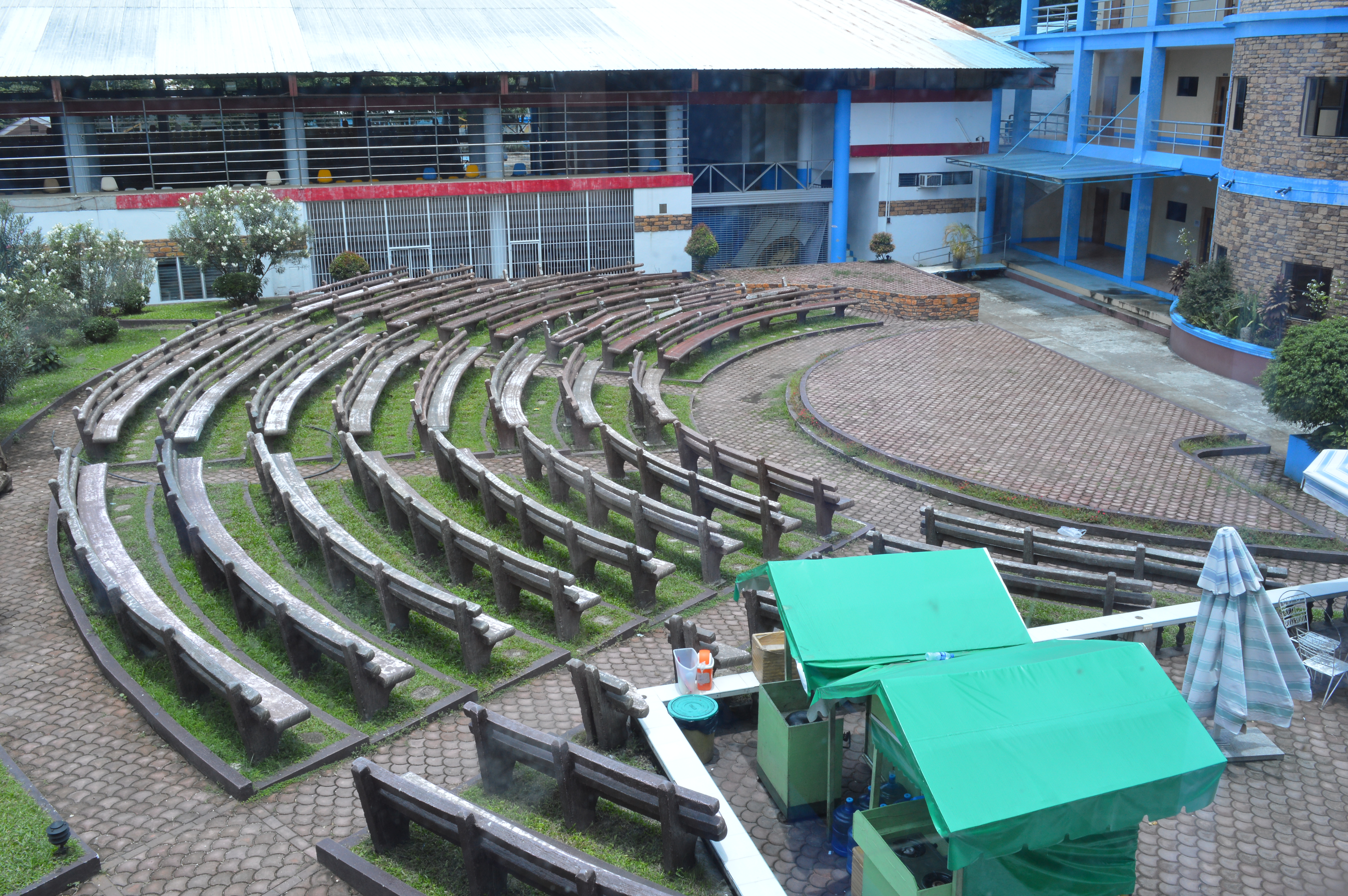
The NORSU Amphitheater

The Dumaguete Campuses of NORSU house ten colleges offering a diverse range of undergraduate degree programs across various disciplines. The Graduate School is also based at the Main Campus. Meanwhile, the College of Agriculture, Forestry, and Fisheries operates at the Pamplona Extension Campus, providing specialized training in the agricultural sciences.

Commission on Higher Education
(CHED) Philippines
National Centers of Development (COD)
Teacher Education

College	Dean	Associate Dean
College of Agriculture, Forestry and Fisheries	Dr. Darlyn B. Posas	Dr. Josie M. Rodriguez
College of Arts and Sciences	Dr. Priscilla S. Cielo	Dr. Catherine T. Eliaga
College of Business Administration	Dr. Lovely R. Tinguha	Ms. Reli Maria L. Barillo
College of Criminal Justice Education	Dr. Jose Rene A. Cepe	
College of Engineering and Architecture	Dr. Josef Vill S. Villanueva	Engr. Elijah B. Serate
College of Industrial Technology	Dr. Herminio S. Tinguban	Assoc. Prof. Carlos L. Elloreg Jr.
College of Nursing, Pharmacy & Allied Health Sciences	Dr. Christine Y. Dela Peña	Assoc. Prof. Analiza V. Bais
College of Teacher Education	Dr. Roulette P. Cordevilla	Dr. Regidor T. Carale
College of Tourism and Hospitality Management	Dr. Tulip F. Lopez	Dr. Millard Vaughn Tubog
School of Law	Atty. Marcelino Mikhail Lee L. Maxino	Atty. Mary Sloane T. Rockwell-Callao
Graduate School	Dr. Chizanne S. Larena	

== Campuses ==
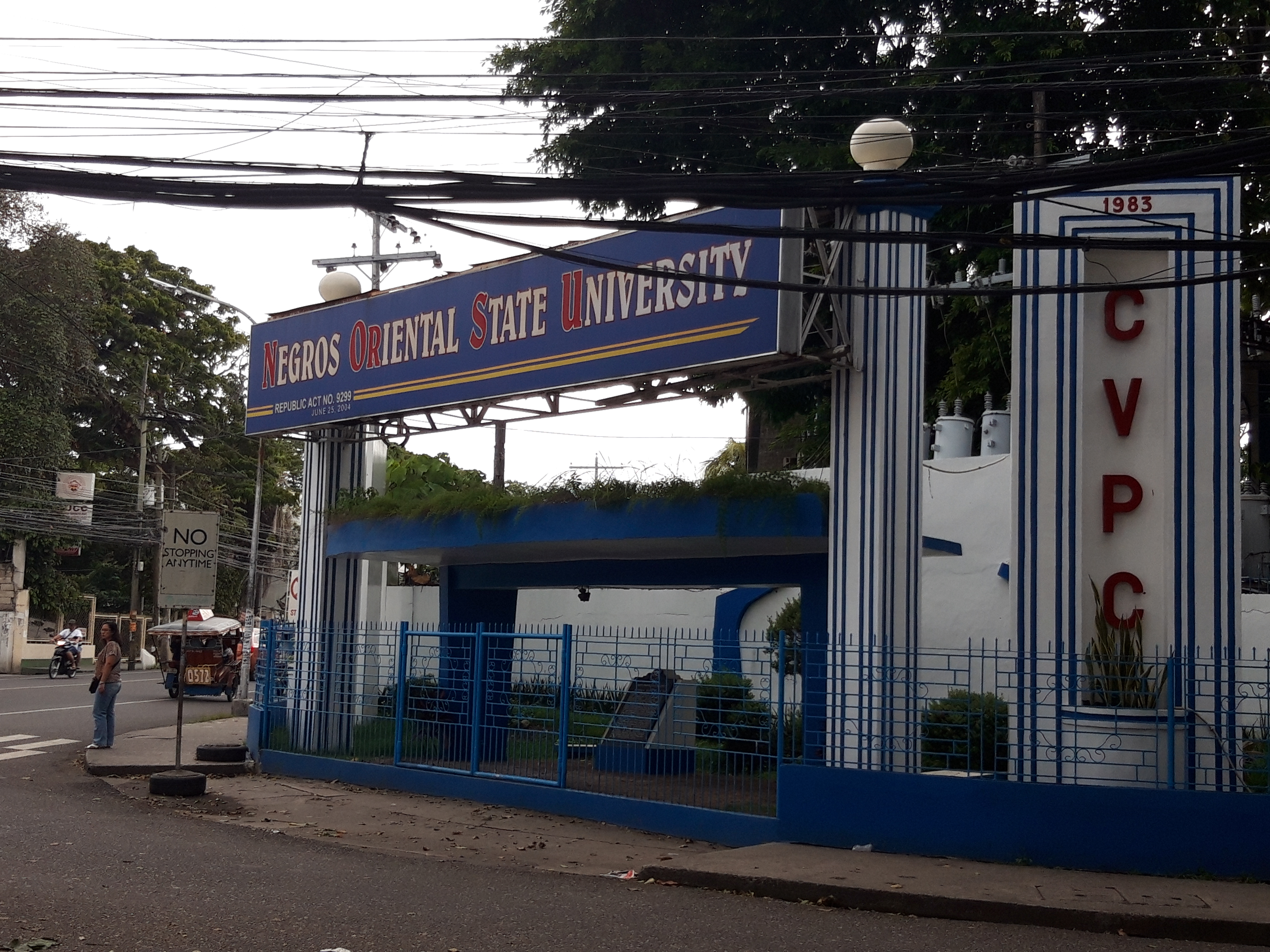
NORSU Main Campus corner signage

Campus	Location	Campus Director
Main Campus I	Kagawasan Avenue, Dumaguete City	Dr. Ryan O. Tayco
Main Campus II	Bajumpandan, Dumaguete City	Dr. Ryan O. Tayco
Pamplona Extension Campus (Note: extension of Main Campus)	Poblacion, Pamplona	Dr. Ryan O. Tayco
Bais Campus I (Note: formerly Bais School of Fisheries)	Okiot, Bais City	Dr. Dennis R. Chiu
Bais Campus II (Note: formerly Genaro Goñi Memorial College)	Quezon Street, Bais City	Dr. Dennis R. Chiu
Bayawan–Sta. Catalina Campus (Note: formerly Negros Oriental National Agricultural School)	National Highway, Caranoche, Sta. Catalina	
Guihulngan Campus (Note: formerly Guihulngan Vocational School)	National Highway, Poblacion, Guihulngan City	Dr. Richard P. Osumo
Mabinay Campus (Note: formerly Mabinay Institute of Technology)	Old Namangka, Mabinay	Dr. Arcie S. Nogra
Siaton Campus (Note: formerly Siaton Community College)	Progresso Street, Poblacion III, Siaton	Dr. Candido G. Kinkito Jr.

== Student life ==
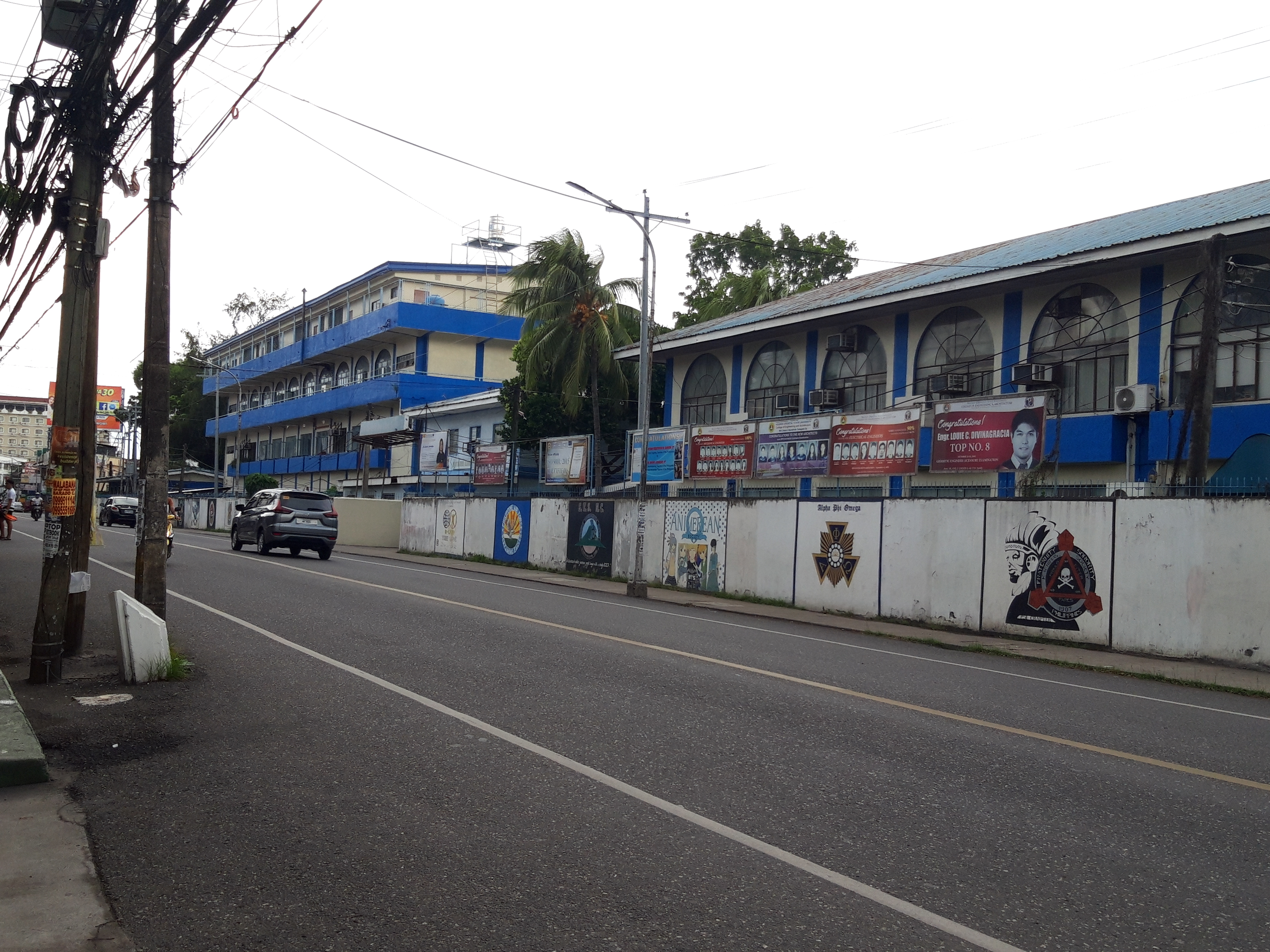
NORSU Main Campus eastern wall mural

NORSU is known as the school for poor but deserving students. As a state university, NORSU is covered by the free tuition law and attracts thousands of enrollees with only hundreds chosen. NORSU consistently produces many board passers and topnotchers every year.

=== Enrollment and population ===
The university adopted a bi-semestral system wherein students enroll twice each year. Starting S.Y. 2019-2020, NORSU opened the school year on August following the mandate of CHED.

The Dumaguete campuses alone has an average enrollment of about 12,000 students per semester. University-wide enrollment reaches more than 20,000. NORSU doesn't only cater Oriental Negrenses but also students from other provinces notably Siquijor, Negros Occidental, Cebu and Zamboanga del Norte. Some may come from farther provinces, even from Luzon. As of the 1st semester of SY 2017-2018, the population is more or less 12,000 students in the main campuses.

=== Pylon ===
Pylon is the Official Yearbook of Negros Oriental State University System. Pylon consist of four (4) Departments: Creative Design & Photography Department, Creative Writing Department, Information, Equipment and Record Management Department and Multimedia & Information System Department.

=== Student government ===
The student government of Negros Oriental State University, named Negros Oriental State University – Federation of Supreme Student Governments (NORSU–FSSG), is composed of all the student governments of all NORSU system namely:

1. NORSU Supreme Student Government of Dumaguete City (NORSU SSGDC)
2. NORSU Supreme Student Government of Bayawan-Sta. Catalina (NORSU SSGBSC)
3. NORSU Supreme Student Government of Bais City (NORSU SSGBC)
4. NORSU Supreme Student Government of Siaton Campus (NORSU SSGSC)
5. NORSU Supreme Student Government of Guihulngan City (NORSU SSGGC)
6. NORSU Supreme Student Government of Mabinay Campus (NORSU SSGMC)

=== The NORSUnian ===
The NORSUnian, commonly known as TN, is the official weekly student publication of the Negros Oriental State University (NORSU) System (formerly Central Visayas Polytechnic College) located in Dumaguete City in Negros Oriental, Philippines. The NORSUnian is one of the three acclaimed student publications in the country which comes out weekly together with the Philippine Collegian of the University of the Philippines in Metro Manila, and the Weekly Sillimanian of Silliman University of Dumaguete.

Formerly known as The Edutech, the publication has grown in number and coverage with 15 writers and four editors, with 10 other members including layout artists and webpage designers.

In its quest to "Fight for Students, Write for Students" (TN dogma), TN has not only published stories about in-campus activities but also columns and opinion articles on national, local, and societal issues geared toward the positive transformation of the country.

== Hugyawan Festival ==
The Hugyawan Festival, held on NORSU's Foundation Day, is a celebration with a parade, festivities, and street parties to showcase the way of life of the inhabitants of Negros Oriental, and at the same time, capture the customary response of the Negrenses towards Nature, Fate, and what God has given them, which is thanksgiving through celebration, merrymaking and revelry.

Hugyawan, comes from the Cebuano term “hugyaw” or revelry, is a condensation of the phrase “hugot sa pagbayaw”, which literally translates to sincere tribute or heartfelt offering to God, country and culture and to ourselves. On the cultural front, “hugyaw” means “to make very loud noise using drums and other musical instruments or any other indigenous materials that would make varied types of noise” Making noise is done while dancing, jumping and parading on the streets. It is participated in by all the campuses of the NORSU System.

== NORSU-ROTC ==
Negros Oriental State University—ROTC is the only program offering the Air Force-ROTC, Naval-ROTC and Army-ROTC in the Philippines together with the Literacy Training Service (LTS) pursuant to Republic Act 9163 or otherwise known as " The National Service Training Program (NSTP) Act of 2001."

== See also ==
- The NORSUnian
