= The Weekly Sillimanian =

- Towards a Progressive Campus Press
- Type: Student publication
- Format: Broadsheet
- Owner: Silliman University
- Editor-in-chief: Jasper Dominic F. Miranda
- Associate editor: Lysander Kendrick Tiu
- Founded: 1903
- Language: English
- Headquarters: G/F Guy Hall, SU Campus, Dumaguete, Philippines
- Circulation: University-wide
- Website: twsillimanian.com

The Weekly Sillimanian, also known as tWS, is the official weekly student paper of Silliman University, a private university in Dumaguete, Philippines. Its origin dates back to as early as 1903. Today, the paper is one of only four campus publications in the country that publishes on a weekly basis. Its office is situated at the ground floor of Guy Hall, SU Campus along Hibbard Avenue.

== History ==
=== Establishment ===
the Weekly Sillimanian traces its origins to the launching of the first campus publication of the then Silliman Institute named as Silliman Truth. As the first periodical in the Province of Negros Oriental at that time, the little magazine that it was served both the public and the campus. Copies were mailed to the Presbyterian Board and to other subscribers. Varied in terms of content, the publication was multilingual. English, Spanish and Cebuano were interchangeably used. The initial copies of the magazine were printed using a small press purchased by Dr. David Hibbard but later, copies were printed using a much larger press after a $400 grant was received by the Institute from Dr. Horace Silliman.

During the early years of the Silliman Truth (1903–1918), the publication was edited primarily by American missionaries. However, in August 1918 a decision was made to assign the editing to Junior and Senior English students. This evolved the paper from being a missionary-edited publication to that of a student organ.

=== Transformation ===
By the year 1920, the missionary-founded Silliman Truth was foreshadowed by the emergence of an outright student periodical bearing the name Sillimanian. Published twice a week, the paper became the official student organ of Silliman University. In the absence of a regular alumni publication during that period, the Sillimanian became an effective tool in updating the alumni of events that transpire in the campus and vice versa. The Silliman Truth on the other hand was transformed as a monthly periodical, serving as the official publication of the University's Board of Trustees. At the outbreak of the Second World War, the Sillimanian became a daily newspaper and was published both in English and Cebuano, becoming at that time as the voice of the resistance movement in the province against the Japanese occupation.

In 1958, the school paper first competed in the Columbia Scholastic Press Association Contest in Columbia University, a member of the Ivy League, and won several First Place awards.

In 1967, the daily Sillimanian became a weekly and served primarily as a school publication. Due to lack of a regular and reliable community periodical in Dumaguete during that period, the Sillimanian continued to contain a community portion where events of Dumaguete and Negros Oriental are published. In the 1970s, an experiment was made to hand over total control of the paper to the student body. The position of a faculty adviser was abolished and because of this administrative action, the school paper eventually fell into the hands of militant activists. When Martial Law was declared by President Ferdinand Marcos in 1972, the office of the Sillimanian was raided by the Philippine Constabulary (now the Philippine National Police) and was closed down for three years.

=== Weekly Sillimanian ===
After school papers in the country were allowed to resume in 1974, the Sillimanian was revived as a fortnightly in 1975 and resumed as a weekly in June 1976. Since its resumption, the Sillimanian has been referred to as the Weekly Sillimanian and continues to be named as such today. At times, it is abbreviated with three letters: a small letter "t" and two capitalized letters "W" and "S" forming tWS.

At present, the school paper is assigned with a faculty adviser and placed under supervision of the University's Office of Information and Publications. The tWS office is currently situated at the Guy Hall, SU Campus, Dumaguete, Negros Oriental, Philippines.

== Notes and references ==
=== References ===
- Carson, Arthur, L. (1965), Silliman University, 1901-1959, United Board for Christian Higher Education in Asia.
- Tiempo, Edilberto K.; Maslog, Crispin C.; Sitoy, T. Valentino Jr. (1977), Silliman University, 1901-1976, Silliman University Press.
