= M'lang F.C. =

M'lang
- Full name: M'lang Football Club
- Nickname(s): Blue Kawayan

M'lang Football Club is a Filipino football club based in M'lang, Cotabato. M'lang has played at the final phase of the PFF National Men's Club Championship.
