= Football at the 2015 SEA Games – Men's team squads =

Below are the squads for the Football at the 2015 SEA Games - men's tournament, hosted by Singapore, which took place between 29 May and 15 June 2015.

== Group A ==
=== Singapore ===
Head coach: (Singapore) Aide Iskandar

No.	Pos.	Player	Date of birth (age)	Club
1	GK	Rudy Khairullah	19 July 1994 (aged 20)	(Football Association of Singapore) Courts Young Lions
2	DF	Shakir Hamzah	10 October 1992 (aged 22)	(Football Association of Singapore) Courts Young Lions
3	DF	Fadli Kamis	24 March 1994 (aged 21)	(Football Association of Singapore) Courts Young Lions
4	DF	Amirul Adli Azmi	13 January 1996 (aged 19)	(Football Association of Singapore) Courts Young Lions
5	MF	Adam Swandi	12 January 1996 (aged 19)	(Football Association of Singapore) Courts Young Lions
6	MF	Anumanthan Kumar	14 July 1994 (aged 20)	(Football Association of Singapore) Courts Young Lions
7	FW	Sahil Suhaimi	8 July 1992 (aged 22)	(Football Association of Malaysia) LionsXII
8	MF	Shamil Sharif	8 May 1992 (aged 23)	(Football Association of Singapore) Courts Young Lions
9	FW	Amy Recha	13 May 1992 (aged 23)	(Football Association of Singapore) Courts Young Lions
10	FW	Faris Ramli	24 August 1992 (aged 22)	(Football Association of Malaysia) LionsXII
11	MF	Shahfiq Ghani	17 March 1992 (aged 23)	(Football Association of Singapore) Courts Young Lions
12	MF	Pravin Guanasagaran	12 January 1993 (aged 22)	(Football Association of Singapore) Courts Young Lions
13	DF	Ho Wai Loon	20 August 1993 (aged 21)	(Football Association of Singapore) Balestier Khalsa
15	DF	Sheikh Abdul Hadi	24 March 1992 (aged 23)	(Football Association of Singapore) Courts Young Lions
17	DF	Irfan Fandi	13 August 1997 (aged 17)	(Football Association of Singapore) Courts Young Lions
18	DF	Al-Qaasimy Rahman (c)	21 January 1992 (aged 23)	(Football Association of Singapore) Courts Young Lions
19	MF	Stanely Ng	27 May 1992 (aged 23)	(Football Association of Singapore) Home United
23	MF	Suria Prakash	23 December 1993 (aged 21)	(Football Association of Singapore) Courts Young Lions
24	GK	Syazwan Buhari	7 June 1992 (aged 22)	(Football Association of Singapore) Courts Young Lions
28	MF	Safirul Sulaiman	12 October 1992 (aged 22)	(Football Association of Singapore) Courts Young Lions

=== Indonesia ===
Head coach: (Indonesia) Aji Santoso

No.	Pos.	Player	Date of birth (age)	Club
1	GK	Teguh Amiruddin	13 August 1993 (aged 21)	(Football Association of Indonesia) Barito Putera
2	DF	Vava Mario Yagalo	21 April 1993 (aged 22)	(Football Association of Indonesia) Persija Jakarta
3	DF	Abduh Lestaluhu	16 October 1993 (aged 21)	(Football Association of Indonesia) Persija Jakarta
4	DF	Syaiful Cahya	28 May 1992 (aged 23)	(Football Association of Indonesia) Persija Jakarta
5	DF	Zalnando	25 December 1996 (aged 18)	(Football Association of Indonesia) Sriwijaya
6	MF	Evan Dimas	13 March 1995 (aged 20)	(Football Association of Indonesia) Bhayangkara
7	FW	Ahmad Nufiandani	20 November 1994 (aged 20)	(Football Association of Indonesia) Arema Cronus
8	MF	Muhammad Hargianto	24 July 1996 (aged 18)	(Football Association of Indonesia) Bhayangkara
9	FW	Muchlis Hadi	26 October 1996 (aged 18)	(Football Association of Indonesia) PSM Makassar
10	FW	Wawan Febrianto	23 February 1994 (aged 21)	(Football Association of Indonesia) Persipasi Bandung Raya
11	FW	Yandi Munawar	25 May 1992 (aged 23)	(Football Association of Indonesia) Persib Bandung
12	GK	Muhammad Natshir	13 February 1993 (aged 22)	(Football Association of Indonesia) Persib Bandung
13	MF	Manahati Lestusen (c)	17 December 1993 (aged 21)	(Football Association of Indonesia) Barito Putera
15	DF	Agung Prasetyo	22 December 1992 (aged 22)	(Football Association of Indonesia) PSM Makassar
16	DF	Hansamu Yama	16 January 1995 (aged 20)	(Football Association of Indonesia) Barito Putera
17	MF	Paulo Sitanggang	17 October 1995 (aged 19)	(Football Association of Indonesia) Barito Putera
18	FW	Adam Alis	19 December 1993 (aged 21)	(Football Association of Indonesia) Persija Jakarta
19	MF	Zulfiandi	17 July 1995 (aged 19)	(Football Association of Indonesia) Bhayangkara
20	FW	Ilham Armaiyn	10 May 1996 (aged 19)	(Football Association of Indonesia) Bhayangkara

=== Myanmar ===
Head coach: (Myanmar) Kyi Lwin

No.	Pos.	Player	Date of birth (age)	Club
1	GK	Kyaw Zin Phyo	1 February 1994 (aged 21)	(Myanmar Football Federation) Magway
5	MF	Sithu Aung	16 October 1996 (aged 18)	(Myanmar Football Federation) Yadanarbon
6	MF	Hlaing Bo Bo	8 July 1996 (aged 18)	(Myanmar Football Federation) Yadanarbon
7	MF	Aung Show Thar Maung	7 March 1993 (aged 22)	(Myanmar Football Federation) Magway
8	MF	Nay Lin Tun (c)	19 March 1993 (aged 22)	(Myanmar Football Federation) Ayeyawady United
9	FW	Kaung Sat Naing	21 March 1994 (aged 21)	(Myanmar Football Federation) Magway
11	FW	Aung Kyaw Naing	20 December 1994 (aged 20)	(Myanmar Football Federation) Ayeyawady United
12	DF	Kyaw Zin Lwin	4 May 1993 (aged 22)	(Myanmar Football Federation) Magway
13	DF	Ko Ko Hein	27 August 1994 (aged 20)	(Myanmar Football Federation) Zwekapin United
14	DF	Phyo Ko Ko Thein	24 January 1993 (aged 22)	(Myanmar Football Federation) Ayeyawady United
15	DF	Hein Thiha Zaw	1 August 1995 (aged 19)	(Myanmar Football Federation) Ayeyawady United
17	FW	Zon Moe Aung	8 July 1993 (aged 21)	(Myanmar Football Federation) Yangon United
19	MF	Chit Su Moe	4 December 1994 (aged 20)	(Myanmar Football Federation) Chin United
20	FW	Shine Thura	10 March 1996 (aged 19)	(Myanmar Football Federation) Yadanarbon
21	MF	Ye Ko Oo	20 August 1994 (aged 20)	(Myanmar Football Federation) Yadanarbon
22	FW	Thiha Zaw	28 December 1993 (aged 21)	(Myanmar Football Federation) Ayeyawady United
26	DF	Ye Win Aung	6 August 1993 (aged 21)	(Myanmar Football Federation) Yadanarbon
27	DF	Thein Naing Oo	14 May 1995 (aged 20)	(Myanmar Football Federation) Kanbawza
29	DF	Win Zin Oo	4 March 1994 (aged 21)	(Myanmar Football Federation) Yadanarbon
30	GK	Aung Wai Phyo	3 May 1993 (aged 22)	(Myanmar Football Federation) Yangon United

=== Cambodia ===
Head coach: (South Korea) Lee Tae-hoon

No.	Pos.	Player	Date of birth (age)	Club
1	GK	Um Sereyroth	25 September 1995 (aged 19)	(Football Federation of Cambodia) National Defense Ministry
2	DF	Sok Sovan	5 April 1992 (aged 23)	(Football Federation of Cambodia) Boeung Ket Angkor
3	DF	Nen Sothearoth	24 December 1995 (aged 19)	(Football Federation of Cambodia) Svay Rieng
4	DF	Nub Tola	1 October 1996 (aged 18)	(Football Federation of Cambodia) Svay Rieng
5	DF	Soeuy Visal	19 August 1995 (aged 19)	(Football Federation of Cambodia) Svay Rieng
6	DF	Samoeun Pidor	20 May 1996 (aged 19)	(Football Federation of Cambodia) Svay Rieng
7	FW	Prak Mony Udom (c)	24 March 1994 (aged 21)	(Football Federation of Cambodia) Svay Rieng
8	FW	Hoy Phallin	30 March 1996 (aged 19)	(Football Federation of Cambodia) Svay Rieng
9	FW	Phuong Soksana	2 April 1992 (aged 23)	(Football Federation of Cambodia) National Defense Ministry
10	FW	Keo Sokpheng	3 March 1992 (aged 23)	(Football Federation of Cambodia) Boeung Ket Angkor
11	FW	Chan Vathanaka	23 June 1994 (aged 20)	(Football Federation of Cambodia) Boeung Ket Angkor
12	MF	Sos Suhana	4 April 1992 (aged 23)	(Football Federation of Cambodia) Phnom Penh Crown
13	MF	Ol Ravy	15 August 1993 (aged 21)	(Football Federation of Cambodia) National Police Commissary
14	MF	Tith Dina	5 June 1993 (aged 21)	(Football Federation of Cambodia) National Police Commissary
15	MF	Sok Chanraksmey	10 January 1992 (aged 23)	(Football Federation of Cambodia) Cambodia Tiger
16	DF	Ngoy Srin	1 September 1994 (aged 20)	(Football Federation of Cambodia) Phnom Penh Crown
17	FW	Chhin Chhoeun	10 September 1992 (aged 22)	(Football Federation of Cambodia) National Defense Ministry
20	FW	Phanny Y Ratha	20 May 1993 (aged 22)	(Football Federation of Cambodia) Svay Rieng
21	GK	Peng Bunchay	2 April 1992 (aged 23)	(Football Federation of Cambodia) Boeung Ket Angkor
22	DF	Touch Pancharong	7 July 1992 (aged 22)	(Football Federation of Cambodia) Boeung Ket Angkor

=== Philippines ===
Head coach: (Philippines) Marlon Maro

Note: The Philippines were the only team not to use a fixed captain at the Games. Captaincy was shared between Gerardo Valmayor, Florencio Badelic Jr., Shirmar Felongco and Fitch Arboleda.

No.	Pos.	Player	Date of birth (age)	Club
1	GK	Florencio Badelic Jr.	22 May 1994 (aged 21)	(Philippine Football Federation) Global
2	DF	Mark Besaña	14 March 1995 (aged 20)	(Philippine Football Federation) UP Fighting Maroons
3	DF	Neil Dorimon	3 January 1992 (aged 23)	(Philippine Football Federation) Mendiola FC 1991
4	MF	Fitch Arboleda	4 January 1993 (aged 22)	(Philippine Football Federation) Stallion
5	DF	Julian Clariño	15 August 1995 (aged 19)	(Philippine Football Federation) UP Fighting Maroons
6	MF	Nathaniel Alquiros	27 July 1992 (aged 22)	(Philippine Football Federation) Stallion
7	MF	Arnel Amita	10 January 1995 (aged 20)	(Philippine Football Federation) Manila Jeepney
8	MF	Daniel Gadia	3 July 1995 (aged 19)	(Philippine Football Federation) UP Fighting Maroons
9	MF	Paolo Bugas	22 October 1994 (aged 20)	(Philippine Football Federation) Global
11	FW	Connor Tacagni	27 September 1993 (aged 21)	(Philippine Football Federation) Mendiola
14	DF	Dominic del Rosario	14 November 1996 (aged 18)	(Philippine Football Federation) JP Voltes
15	MF	Richard Talaroc	23 April 1995 (aged 20)	(Philippine Football Federation) Global
17	FW	Jaime Cheng	28 August 1995 (aged 19)	
19	FW	Paolo Salenga	17 December 1994 (aged 20)	(Philippine Football Federation) Global
20	FW	Kennedy Uzoka	8 August 1993 (aged 21)	(Philippine Football Federation) Green Archers United
22	DF	Francisco Santos	8 January 1994 (aged 21)	
25	GK	Nathanael Villanueva	25 October 1995 (aged 19)	(Philippine Football Federation) Pachanga Diliman
27	DF	Shirmar Felongco	27 April 1993 (aged 22)	(Philippine Football Federation) Stallion
28	MF	Ronnie Aguisanda	21 January 1992 (aged 23)	(Philippine Football Federation) Green Archers United
29	FW	Gerardo Valmayor	8 June 1992 (aged 22)	(Philippine Football Federation) Pachanga Diliman

== Group B ==
=== Thailand ===
Head coach: (Thailand) Choketawee Promrut

No.	Pos.	Player	Date of birth (age)	Club
1	GK	Chanin Sae-ear	5 July 1992 (aged 22)	(Football Association of Thailand) Chainat Hornbill
2	DF	Peerapat Notchaiya	4 February 1993 (aged 22)	(Football Association of Thailand) BEC Tero Sasana
3	DF	Suriya Singmui	7 April 1995 (aged 20)	(Football Association of Thailand) Muangthong United
4	MF	Chaowat Veerachat	23 June 1996 (aged 18)	(Football Association of Thailand) Buriram United
5	DF	Adisorn Promrak	21 October 1993 (aged 21)	(Football Association of Thailand) BEC Tero Sasana
6	MF	Sarach Yooyen (c)	30 May 1992 (aged 22)	(Football Association of Thailand) Muangthong United
7	MF	Thitipan Puangchan	1 September 1993 (aged 21)	(Football Association of Thailand) Muangthong United
8	DF	Atit Daosawang	11 November 1992 (aged 22)	(Football Association of Thailand) Muangthong United
11	MF	Pinyo Inpinit	1 July 1993 (aged 21)	(Football Association of Thailand) Police United
12	MF	Nurul Sriyankem	8 February 1992 (aged 23)	(Football Association of Thailand) Chonburi
13	DF	Narubadin Weerawatnodom	12 July 1994 (aged 20)	(Football Association of Thailand) Buriram United
14	MF	Pakorn Prempak	2 February 1993 (aged 22)	(Football Association of Thailand) Police United
17	DF	Tanaboon Kesarat	21 September 1993 (aged 21)	(Football Association of Thailand) BEC Tero Sasana
18	MF	Chanathip Songkrasin	5 October 1993 (aged 21)	(Football Association of Thailand) BEC Tero Sasana
19	DF	Tristan Do	31 January 1993 (aged 22)	(Football Association of Thailand) BEC Tero Sasana
20	GK	Somporn Yos	23 June 1993 (aged 21)	(Football Association of Thailand) BEC Tero Sasana
22	FW	Chenrop Samphaodi	2 June 1995 (aged 19)	(Football Association of Thailand) BEC Tero Sasana
23	FW	Chananan Pombuppha	17 March 1992 (aged 23)	(Football Association of Thailand) Muangthong United
24	MF	Siwakorn Jakkuprasat	23 April 1992 (aged 23)	(Football Association of Thailand) Muangthong United
29	MF	Rungrath Poomchantuek	17 May 1992 (aged 23)	(Football Association of Thailand) Chiangrai United

=== Malaysia ===
Head coach: (Malaysia) Ong Kim Swee

No.	Pos.	Player	Date of birth (age)	Club
1	GK	Farhan Abu Bakar	14 February 1993 (aged 22)	(Football Association of Malaysia) Harimau Muda
3	DF	Shahrul Saad	8 July 1993 (aged 21)	(Football Association of Malaysia) Felda United
5	DF	Syazwan Tajudin	7 January 1994 (aged 21)	(Football Association of Malaysia) Kedah
6	MF	D. Saarvindran	4 November 1992 (aged 22)	(Football Association of Malaysia) Pahang
7	MF	Nazmi Faiz Mansor	16 August 1994 (aged 20)	(Football Association of Malaysia) Selangor
8	MF	Saiful Ridzuwan	16 March 1992 (aged 23)	(Football Association of Malaysia) Selangor
9	FW	Syafiq Ahmad	28 June 1995 (aged 19)	(Football Association of Malaysia) Kedah
12	MF	Gary Steven Robbat	3 September 1992 (aged 22)	(Football Association of Malaysia) Johor Darul Ta'zim
16	MF	Nurridzuan Abu Hassan	20 April 1992 (aged 23)	(Football Association of Malaysia) Perak
17	DF	Fandi Othman (c)	25 April 1992 (aged 23)	(Football Association of Malaysia) Johor Darul Ta'zim
18	MF	Syahrul Azwari	12 January 1993 (aged 22)	(Football Association of Malaysia) Harimau Muda
19	MF	Faizat Ghazli	28 November 1994 (aged 20)	(Football Association of Malaysia) Harimau Muda
20	FW	S. Kumaahran	3 July 1996 (aged 18)	(Football Association of Malaysia) Harimau Muda
21	DF	Nazirul Naim	6 April 1993 (aged 22)	(Football Association of Malaysia) Harimau Muda
22	GK	Firdaus Muhamad	13 January 1994 (aged 21)	(Football Association of Malaysia) Kedah
24	DF	Ariff Farhan Isa	4 July 1996 (aged 18)	(Football Association of Malaysia) Harimau Muda
25	DF	Adam Nor	5 January 1996 (aged 19)	(Football Association of Malaysia) Harimau Muda
26	DF	Amer Saidin	25 July 1992 (aged 22)	(Football Association of Malaysia) Johor Darul Ta'zim
28	MF	Amirul Hisyam Kechik	5 May 1995 (aged 20)	(Football Association of Malaysia) Harimau Muda
29	DF	Matthew Davies	7 February 1995 (aged 20)	(Football Association of Malaysia) Pahang

=== Vietnam ===
Head coach: (Japan) Toshiya Miura

No.	Pos.	Player	Date of birth (age)	Club
1	GK	Phạm Văn Tiến	30 April 1993 (aged 22)	(Vietnam Football Federation) Hoàng Anh Gia Lai
2	MF	Nguyễn Hữu Dũng	28 August 1995 (aged 19)	(Vietnam Football Federation) Thanh Hóa
3	DF	Phạm Mạnh Hùng	3 March 1993 (aged 22)	(Vietnam Football Federation) Sông Lam Nghệ An
6	DF	Nguyễn Minh Tùng	9 August 1992 (aged 22)	(Vietnam Football Federation) Than Quảng Ninh
10	FW	Nguyễn Công Phượng	21 January 1995 (aged 20)	(Vietnam Football Federation) Hoàng Anh Gia Lai
11	DF	Đỗ Duy Mạnh	29 September 1996 (aged 18)	(Vietnam Football Federation) Hà Nội
12	DF	Vũ Ngọc Thịnh	8 July 1992 (aged 22)	(Vietnam Football Federation) Hải Phòng
13	MF	Huỳnh Tấn Tài	17 August 1994 (aged 20)	(Vietnam Football Federation) Đồng Tâm Long An
14	MF	Nguyễn Huy Hùng	2 March 1992 (aged 23)	(Vietnam Football Federation) QNK Quảng Nam
15	DF	Quế Ngọc Hải (c)	15 May 1993 (aged 22)	(Vietnam Football Federation) Sông Lam Nghệ An
16	FW	Lê Thanh Bình	8 August 1995 (aged 19)	(Vietnam Football Federation) Thanh Hóa
17	MF	Mạc Hồng Quân	1 January 1992 (aged 23)	(Vietnam Football Federation) Than Quảng Ninh
18	MF	Hồ Ngọc Thắng	10 February 1994 (aged 21)	(Vietnam Football Federation) SHB Đà Nẵng
19	FW	Nguyễn Văn Toàn	12 April 1996 (aged 19)	(Vietnam Football Federation) Hoàng Anh Gia Lai
20	FW	Trần Phi Sơn	14 March 1992 (aged 23)	(Vietnam Football Federation) Sông Lam Nghệ An
22	DF	Nguyễn Thanh Hiền	16 April 1993 (aged 22)	(Vietnam Football Federation) Đồng Tháp
23	MF	Phạm Đức Huy	20 January 1995 (aged 20)	(Vietnam Football Federation) Hà Nội
25	FW	Võ Huy Toàn	15 March 1993 (aged 22)	(Vietnam Football Federation) SHB Đà Nẵng
26	DF	Bùi Tiến Dũng	2 October 1995 (aged 19)	(Vietnam Football Federation) Viettel
27	GK	Phí Minh Long	11 February 1995 (aged 20)	(Vietnam Football Federation) Hà Nội

=== Laos ===
Head coach: (England) Dave Booth

No.	Pos.	Player	Date of birth (age)	Club
1	GK	Vathana Keodouangdeth	28 January 1996 (aged 19)	(Lao Football Federation) Lao Toyota
2	DF	Thinnakone Vongsa	20 March 1992 (aged 23)	(Lao Football Federation) Lao Police
3	DF	Sonevilay Sihavong	18 August 1996 (aged 18)	(Lao Football Federation) Hoang Anh Attapeu
7	FW	Khonesavanh Sihavong	10 October 1994 (aged 20)	(Lao Football Federation) Lao Toyota
8	MF	Keoviengphet Liththideth	30 November 1992 (aged 22)	(Lao Football Federation) Ezra
9	FW	Sitthideth Khanthavong	2 September 1994 (aged 20)	(Lao Football Federation) Lao Police
10	MF	Soukaphone Vongchiengkham	9 March 1992 (aged 23)	(Lao Football Federation) Lane Xang United
11	MF	Maitee Sihalath	10 June 1998 (aged 16)	(Lao Football Federation) Lao Toyota
12	DF	Thenthong Phonsettha	19 October 1993 (aged 21)	(Lao Football Federation) Lao Toyota
13	DF	Bounthavy Sipasong	4 July 1996 (aged 18)	(Lao Football Federation) Hoang Anh Attapeu
14	MF	Soukchinda Natphasouk	30 October 1995 (aged 19)	(Lao Football Federation) Lao Police
15	MF	Phoutthasay Khochalern	29 December 1995 (aged 19)	(Lao Football Federation) Ezra
16	FW	Sinnalone Sihalath	3 May 1994 (aged 21)	(Lao Football Federation) Lao Police
17	MF	Vilayuth Sayyabounsou	27 November 1992 (aged 22)	(Lao Football Federation) Ezra
18	GK	Soukthavy Soundala	2 September 1994 (aged 20)	(Lao Football Federation) Ezra
19	DF	Sengdao Inthilath	3 June 1994 (aged 20)	(Lao Football Federation) Yotha
20	DF	Khouanta Sivongthong	10 February 1992 (aged 23)	(Lao Football Federation) Lao Police
21	MF	Tiny Bounmalay (c)	6 June 1993 (aged 21)	(Lao Football Federation) Lao Police
23	FW	Xaysongkham Champathong	19 May 1993 (aged 22)	(Lao Football Federation) Lao Toyota
26	FW	Lembo Saysana	2 December 1995 (aged 19)	(Lao Football Federation) Hoang Anh Attapeu

=== Brunei ===
Head coach: (Singapore) Stephen Ng Heng Seng

No.	Pos.	Player	Date of birth (age)	Club
1	GK	Ahsanuddin Dani	13 April 1994 (aged 21)	(Football Association of Brunei Darussalam) Tabuan Muda
2	DF	Nur Azees Ali	17 March 1993 (aged 22)	(Football Association of Brunei Darussalam) Tabuan Muda
3	MF	Asnawi Syazni Abdul Aziz	16 June 1996 (aged 18)	(Football Association of Brunei Darussalam) Tabuan Muda
4	DF	Khairil Shahme Suhaimi	16 April 1993 (aged 22)	(Football Association of Brunei Darussalam) Tabuan Muda
5	DF	Suhaimi Anak Sulau	3 March 1996 (aged 19)	(Football Association of Brunei Darussalam) Tabuan Muda
8	DF	Yura Indera Putera Yunos	25 March 1996 (aged 19)	(Football Association of Singapore) DPMM
9	MF	Faiq Jefri Bolkiah (c)	9 May 1998 (aged 17)	(The Football Association) Chelsea
10	MF	Nur Ikhmal Damit	5 March 1993 (aged 22)	(Football Association of Brunei Darussalam) MS ABDB
11	DF	Aminuddin Zakwan Tahir	24 October 1994 (aged 20)	(Football Association of Singapore) DPMM
12	DF	Aman Abdul Rahim	23 June 1996 (aged 18)	(Football Association of Brunei Darussalam) Tabuan Muda
18	MF	Nadzri Erwan	16 June 1995 (aged 19)	(Football Association of Brunei Darussalam) Tabuan Muda
19	FW	Abdul Halim Hassan	17 April 1993 (aged 22)	(Football Association of Brunei Darussalam) Tabuan Muda
20	FW	Saiful Ammar Adis	27 June 1993 (aged 21)	(Football Association of Brunei Darussalam) Tabuan Muda
21	MF	Shafie Effendy	4 August 1995 (aged 19)	(Football Association of Brunei Darussalam) Tabuan Muda
22	DF	Azri Zahari	12 February 1992 (aged 23)	(Football Association of Brunei Darussalam) Najip I-Team
24	DF	Hanif Hamir	22 February 1997 (aged 18)	(Football Association of Brunei Darussalam) Tabuan Muda
25	FW	Rakin Ramli	21 May 1992 (aged 23)	(Football Association of Brunei Darussalam) Tabuan Muda
27	MF	Azwan Ali Rahman	11 January 1992 (aged 23)	(Football Association of Singapore) DPMM
29	FW	Nur Syazwan Halidi	8 August 1993 (aged 21)	(Football Association of Brunei Darussalam) Tabuan Muda
30	GK	Abdul Hafiz Abdul Rahim	6 November 1996 (aged 18)	(Football Association of Brunei Darussalam) Tabuan Muda

=== Timor-Leste ===
Head coach: (Brazil) Fábio Magrão

No.	Pos.	Player	Date of birth (age)	Club
1	GK	Exposto Gusmão	22 October 1996 (aged 18)	(East Timor Football Federation) Teouma
2	DF	Ezequiel Fernandes	8 April 1996 (aged 19)	(East Timor Football Federation) Teouma
3	DF	Jorge Sabas Victor	5 December 1997 (aged 17)	(Football Association of Indonesia) Persiku Kupang
4	DF	Filipe Oliveira	14 May 1995 (aged 20)	(East Timor Football Federation) Teouma
5	FW	Henrique Cruz	6 December 1997 (aged 17)	(East Timor Football Federation) Teouma
6	FW	Anggisu Barbosa (c)	16 March 1993 (aged 22)	(Football Association of Thailand) Sriracha
8	MF	José Oliveira	28 October 1997 (aged 17)	(East Timor Football Federation) Teouma
9	FW	Jairo Neto	4 March 1994 (aged 21)	(Portuguese Football Federation) SL Marinha
10	MF	Nilo Soares	8 June 1992 (aged 22)	(East Timor Football Federation) SLB Dili
11	MF	Nataniel Reis	25 March 1995 (aged 20)	(East Timor Football Federation) Teouma
12	GK	Ramos Maxanches	12 April 1994 (aged 21)	(East Timor Football Federation) Teouma
13	MF	Carlos Magno	29 May 1997 (aged 18)	(East Timor Football Federation) Gleno
14	FW	Frangcyatma Alves	27 January 1997 (aged 18)	(Football Association of Indonesia) Persiku Kupang
15	DF	Agostinho	28 August 1997 (aged 17)	(East Timor Football Federation) Teouma
16	MF	Paulo Helber	28 June 1992 (aged 22)	(Brazilian Football Confederation) Monte Azul
17	DF	Nidio Neto	9 October 1995 (aged 19)	(East Timor Football Federation) Teouma
18	DF	Cândido Oliveira	2 December 1997 (aged 17)	(East Timor Football Federation) Teouma
19	FW	Feliciano Gonçalves	11 February 1997 (aged 18)	(East Timor Football Federation) Teouma
20	GK	Fagio Augusto	29 April 1997 (aged 18)	(East Timor Football Federation) Taouma
23	MF	José Fonseca	19 September 1994 (aged 20)	(Football Association of Thailand) Phayao
