= Blue Guards F.C. =

Blue Guards
- Full name: Blue Guards Football Club
- Founded: 1965; 60 years ago
- Manager: Dodie King
Home colours

Blue Guards Football Club is an amateur Filipino association football club that is one of the three guest teams that joined the fifth edition of the United Football League Cup. The team was able to compete in the group stages of the tournament with Dolphins United, Green Archers United, Loyola Meralco Sparks and Philippine Navy, but lost all of its games including a 33–0 defeat against Loyola. This is regarded as one of the most lopsided scores in the history of the United Football League (UFL) since it began a semi-professional league in 2009.

== History ==
Blue Guards, founded by Johnny Romualdez, Victor Dualan and a group of friends, is one of three amateur guest football club that joined the 2013 UFL Cup, the other two are Bright Star and Manila Jeepney, some of their players are 40 years old and above featuring some of the members are their goalkeeper Samuel Letargo at 40 years of age, striker Noel Reyes at 48 and perhaps the Philippines' oldest active footballer Mindo Fajardo at the age of 80, also several other players have played for the national team during their times. This is the first time that a team that haven't played the third tier of Weekend Football League endeavor to join a top-flight competition like the UFL Cup.

=== 2013 season ===
In their first match, Green Archers United defeated Blue Guards in a 17–0 scoreline that formerly holds the record in most goals scored in the UFL before the match. It was then followed by another loss against Philippine Navy in a huge 10–0 defeat. On their third game, they faced Division 2 side Dolphins United with an 11–1 loss, this is the only game Blue Guards made a goal against their opponent.

Blue Guards ended their run in the tournament at the bottom of the group standings with a −70 in goal difference in losing to all its matches in double digits.

=== 0–33 defeat to Loyola Meralco Sparks ===
On 30 October 2013, the Loyola Meralco Sparks and Blue Guards battled in the group stages of the 2013 UFL Cup Group E. The match was played at the Emperador Stadium, Fort Bonifacio, Taguig, Philippines. It surpassed the largest winning margin in international association football which is a 31–0 victory of Australia against American Samoa and three goals shy of a 36–0 win of Arbroath over Bon Accord.

==== Match summary ====
30 October 2013
18:00 (UTC+8)

| Loyola Meralco Sparks | 33–0 | Blue Guards |
|---|---|---|
| Bonney 1'; P. Younghusband 2', 11', 19', 28', 62', 69', 80', 90'; Hartmann 8', 17', 18', 46', 55'; J. Younghusband 13', 22', 26', 56', 78'; Cañedo 15'; Lee Young 16', 33', 41'; Gould 48', 57', 66', 68', 79', 82', 87'; Morallo 54', 64'; Greatwich 85' | Report |

Emperador Stadium, Taguig

The match was started when Samuel Bonney scored a goal at the first minute. Then came in the next minute when Phil Younghusband scored his first goal of the game. Soon, after 15 minutes it is 6–0 for Loyola, goals by Matthew Hartmann, James Younghusband, his brother Phil and Robert Cañedo. At the eighteenth minute, Blue Guards got their first counterattack of the game, they breach the defense of Loyola to allow Roger Sulit to have a shot on goal, but it misses. The work continued by Lee Joo-Young and Matthew Hartmann enough to put their club by leading 15 goals. The team was able to hold the score in the last 15 minutes of the first half.

In the second half, a tactical change happened for Blue Guards, they switched their formation into 8–1–1. But after two minutes, Matthew Hartmann scored the first goal of the half. Chad Gould subbed in the game and scored a goal from a free kick at the 48th minute. The scoreline reached 17–0. Gould scored 6 more goals, 3 goals each by Jake Morallo and James Younghusband, and 1 goal each by Simon Greatwich and Matthew Hartmann. Phil Younghusband finished the game by scoring in the 90th minute and in the final minute.

Phil Younghusband scored 8 goals at the match which helped him to become the current scoring leader in the tournament at 18 goals, followed by Chad Gould at seven and five goals a piece to his brother James Younghusband and Matthew Hartmann.
