= Mark Villon =

Filipino footballer

Personal information
- Full name: Mark Villon
- Date of birth: 6 July 1983 (age 43)
- Place of birth: Zamboanga City, Philippines
- Height: 1.73 m (5 ft 8 in)
- Position: Defender

Team information
- Current team: Manila Jeepney F.C.
- Number: 4

Senior career*
Years	Team	Apps	(Gls)
2002–2003	San Beda Red Lions	?	(?)
2003–2004	Mendiola United	?	(?)
2004–2006	San Beda Red Lions	?	(?)
2006–2013	Mendiola United	?	(?)
2013–	Manila Jeepney F.C.	0	(0)

International career^{‡}
2002–2006	Philippines	11	(0)
- * Club domestic league appearances and goals as of 21:43, 10 June 2010 (UTC) ‡ National team caps and goals as of 21:43, 10 June 2010 (UTC)

Mark Villon (born 6 July 1983) is a Filipino international footballer who plays as a defender for Manila Jeepney F.C. Villon previously played for San Beda College and made his international debut in 2002.
