= Chul-soo =

- Hangul: 철수
- RR: Cheolsu
- MR: Ch'ŏlsu

Chul-soo, also spelled Cheol-su, Cheol-soo, Chol-su, or Chol-soo, is a Korean given name.

People with this name include:

- Park Chul-soo (1948–2013), South Korean film director
- Kim Chul-soo (footballer) (born 1952), South Korean footballer
- Chol Soo Lee (1952–2014), Korean-American exoneree
- Bae Cheol-soo (born 1953), South Korean radio host
- Ahn Cheol-soo (born 1962), South Korean businessman and politician
- Choe Chol-su (born 1969), North Korean boxer
- Jang Cheol-soo (born 1974), South Korean film director
- Kim Chol-su (born 1982), North Korean judoka

Fictional characters with this name include

- Chul-soo, in 2012 South Korean film A Werewolf Boy
- Park Chul-soo, in 2006 South Korean television series What's Up Fox
- Cheol-su, Young-Hee's other doll in Squid Game

== See also ==
- List of Korean given names
