= BGFC =

BGFC may refer to:

- Bangkok Glass F.C.
- Beijing Guoan F.C.
- Blue Guards F.C.
