= 2015 United Football League =

The 2015 United Football League was the sixth season of the UFL since its establishment as a semi-professional league in 2009. Ten teams competed in UFL Division 1 while seven teams were in Division 2.

Global were the defending champions, having won the Division 1 of the 2014 United Football League season.

Ceres outclassed Team Socceroo 6-0 on 15 July 2015 to clinch the 2015 United Football League title with two games to spare.

== Season summary ==
UFL Division 1 headlined a complete 10-team cast for the highest level of Philippine League football. Ceres and Manila Jeepney played in Division I, replacing the relegated Pasargad and the spot left by Manila Nomads' last season.

UFL Division 2 only had seven participants with new side Kabuscorp and returnees Mendiola. Six Division 2 clubs, namely, Philippine Air Force, Manila Nomads, UIM, Philippine Navy, Dolphins United, Cimarron, participated in the 2015 UFL League competitions.

== Division 1 ==
United Football League Division 1
- Season: 2015
- Champions: Ceres
- Relegated: Philippine Army
- Matches: 81
- Goals: 341 (4.21 per match)
- Top goalscorer: 18 goals (Spain) Adrián Gallardo
- Highest scoring: 14 goals Pachanga Diliman 5–9 Green Archers United
- Longest winning run: 7 games Ceres
- Longest unbeaten run: 10 games Global
- Longest winless run: 10 games Team Socceroo
- Longest losing run: 10 games Team Socceroo

=== Clubs ===
Club	Head coach	Captain	Kit manufacturer	Shirt sponsor
Ceres	(Philippines) Ali Go	(Philippines) Juan Luis Guirado	(Germany) Adidas	Ceres Liner
Global	(Scotland) Leigh Manson	(Philippines) Misagh Bahadoran	(Philippines) Accel	Smart
Green Archers United	(Philippines) Rodolfo Alicante	(Philippines) Christian Pasilan	(Japan) Mizuno	Globe Telecom
Kaya	(Trinidad and Tobago) Fabien Larry Lewis	(Philippines) Chris Greatwich	(Philippines) LGR Athletic	LBC Express
Loyola Meralco Sparks	(Scotland) Simon McMenemy	(Philippines) James Younghusband	(United States) Under Armour	Meralco
Manila Jeepney	(South Korea) Kim Chul-Soo	(Italy) Davide Cortina	(Philippines) LGR Athletic	
Pachanga Diliman	(Japan) Yuki Matsuda	(Philippines) Anton Gonzales	(England) Umbro	
Philippine Army	(Philippines) Patricio Bumidang	(Philippines) Roel Gener		Artificial Turf Sejung
Stallion	(Philippines) Ernest Nierras	(Philippines) Ruben Doctora	(Japan) Mizuno	Gilligan's
Team Socceroo	(Philippines) Franklin Cacacho	(South Korea) Lee Jeong Woo	(Philippines) Loro Sports	Chevrolet

=== Managerial changes ===
Team	Outgoing head coach	Manner of departure	Incoming head coach
Loyola	(Philippines) Vince Santos	End of Contract	(Scotland) Simon McMenemy
Kaya	(Australia) David Perkovic	End of Contract	(England) Adam Reekie
Kaya	(England) Adam Reekie	Resigned	(Trinidad and Tobago) Fabien Larry Lewis
Ceres	(South Korea) Cha Seung-ryong	Resigned	(Philippines) Ali Go

=== Venues ===
Club	Stadium	Location	Capacity
All Clubs	Rizal Memorial Stadium	Manila	12,000

=== League table ===
Pos	Team	Pld	W	D	L	GF	GA	GD	Pts	Qualification or relegation
1	Ceres (C)	17	14	1	2	59	13	+46	43	Qualification to the 2015 AFC Cup Group stage
2	Global	17	10	5	2	50	15	+35	35	
3	Loyola Meralco Sparks	17	11	2	4	46	26	+20	35	
4	Kaya (Q)	17	10	1	6	47	23	+24	31	Qualification to the 2015 AFC Cup Group stage (Note: Kaya qualified to the 2016 AFC Cup Group stage by winning the 2015 UFL Cup.)
5	Stallion	17	10	1	6	36	24	+12	31	
6	Green Archers United	17	7	3	7	36	33	+3	24	
7	Manila Jeepney	17	4	4	9	30	48	−18	16	
8	Pachanga Diliman	17	3	3	11	27	52	−25	12	
9	Team Socceroo (R)	17	1	1	15	7	69	−62	4	Qualification to the 2015 Relegation playoffs
10	Philippine Army (D, E)	9	0	1	8	3	38	−35	1	Disqualified from the tournament

Updated to match(es) played on 6 August 2015. Source: rsssf.com, soccerway.com
Rules for classification: 1) Points; 2) Goal Difference; 3) Goals Scored
(C) Champions; (D) Disqualified; (E) Eliminated; (Q) Qualified for the phase indicated; (R) Relegated

=== Results ===
Home \ Away	CER	GLO	GAU	KAY	LMS	MJP	PAC	PAR	STA	SOC
Ceres		2–2	2–1	2–0	5–2	2–1	3–0		2–1	6–0
Global	2–0		1–1	0–2	2–2	10–1	1–1	5–0	2–1	6–0
Green Archers United	0–7	0–2		0–2	0–1	1–1	3–1		3–3	4–0
Kaya	1–2	1–3	0–2		3–2	4–1	4–1	4–0	0–3	5–0
Loyola Meralco Sparks	1–6	1–0	4–0	3–3		2–0	5–2	7–0	1–2	1–0
Manila Jeepney	2–1	2–2	2–3	0–4	2–3		1–4	2–2	3–2	5–0
Pachanga Diliman	0–5	0–2	5–9	2–6	0–4	3–3		4–1	1–3	1–1
Philippine Army	0–7		0–3						0–2	0–4
Stallion	0–3	1–2	2–1	2–1	1–3	4–1	1–0			4–0
Team Socceroo	0–4	0–8	0–5	0–7	0–4	1–3	0–2		1–4	

Source: uflph.com
Legend: Blue = home team win; Yellow = draw; Red = away team win.

== Division 2 ==
United Football League Division 2
- Season: 2015
- Champions: Laos
- Promoted: Laos
- Matches: 36
- Goals: 152 (4.22 per match)
- Top goalscorer: 12 goals (Japan) Chihiro Noda
- Highest scoring: 11 goals JP Voltes 9–2 Mendiola
- Longest winning run: 11 games Laos
- Longest unbeaten run: 12 games Laos
- Longest winless run: 6 games Kabuscorp
- Longest losing run: 6 games Kabuscorp

=== Clubs ===
Club	Head coach	Team captain	Kit manufacturer	Shirt sponsor
Agila	(Philippines) Ramon Vicente Roxas	(Nigeria) Olayemi Bakare	LGR Athletic	Blue Booters
Forza	(Philippines) Jun Mark Saraga	(Philippines) Allan Auman	LGR Athletic	Orient Freight
JP Voltes	(Japan) Shinichiro Maeno	(Japan) Yuki Tanaka	LGR Athletic	JK Mart
Kabuscorp De Laguna	(Philippines) Eliezer Fabroada		LGT Athletic	Kabuscorp SCP
Laos	(Philippines) Rudy Del Rosario	(Philippines) Rolly Lear	LGR Athletic	
Mendiola	(Philippines) Aris Caslib		Adidas	victory liner
Pasargad	(Philippines) Mike Agbayani	(Philippines) Jay Torres	LGR Athletic	Cord Marine Epoxy

=== Venues ===
Club	Stadium	Location	Capacity
All Clubs	Rizal Memorial Stadium	Manila	12,000

=== League table ===
Pos	Team	Pld	W	D	L	GF	GA	GD	Pts	Qualification or relegation
1	Laos (C, P)	11	10	1	0	33	8	+25	31	Promotion to the 2016 UFL Division 1
2	JP Voltes (O, P)	11	7	3	1	48	12	+36	24	Qualification to the 2015 Promotion playoffs
3	Forza	11	6	2	3	27	17	+10	20	
4	Agila	11	4	0	7	17	35	−18	12	
5	Mendiola	11	2	2	7	15	28	−13	8	
6	Pasargad	11	2	2	7	11	25	−14	8	
7	Laguna Kabuscorp (D, E)	6	0	0	6	1	27	−26	0	Disqualified from the tournament

Updated to match(es) played on 6 August 2015. Source: rsssf.com
Rules for classification: 1) Points; 2) Goal Difference; 3) Goals Scored
(C) Champions; (D) Disqualified; (E) Eliminated; (O) Play-off winners; (P) Promoted

=== Results ===
Home \ Away	AGI	FOR	JPV	KDL	LAO	MEN	PSG
Agila		1–3	0–8	3–0	0–3	4–1	3–1
Forza	5–2		2–2		1–2	4–2	2–1
JP Voltes	8–0	2–1		7–0	2–3	9–2	5–0
Kabuscorp De Laguna		1–7			0–3	0–3	
Laos	3–2	3–0	1–1			2–1	3–1
Mendiola	3–1	0–0	2–3		0–3		0–1
Pasargad	0–1	1–2	1–1	4–0	0–7	1–1	

Source: uflph.com
Legend: Blue = home team win; Yellow = draw; Red = away team win.

== Promotion-relegation playoffs ==
Team Socceroo, the 9th-placed team of Division 1 faced the 2nd-placed 2015 UFL Division 2 side JP Voltes in a two-legged playoff. The winner on aggregate score after both matches will earn a spot in the 2016 UFL Division 1.

Team 1	Agg.	Team 2	1st leg	2nd leg
Team Socceroo	1 - 12	JP Voltes	1 - 3	0 - 9

1st Leg

August 8, 2015
19:30 PST

Team Socceroo	1 - 3	JP Voltes
Matsunaga 28'	Report	Tatsuya Nakamura 6'; Michael Mabanag 26' del Rosario 45'

Rizal Memorial Stadium, Manila

2nd Leg

August 11, 2015
19:30 PST

JP Voltes	9 - 0	Team Socceroo
del Rosario 17', 49', 72'; Chihiro Noda 34', 45', 61', 69', 83'; John Celiz 57'	Report

Rizal Memorial Stadium, Manila

JP Voltes won 12–1 on aggregate and earned a United Football League Division 1 spot for the 2016 season.

== Top goalscorers ==
=== Division 1 ===
Rank	Name	Team	Goals
1	(Spain) Adrián Gallardo	Ceres	18
2	(Senegal) Robert Lopez Mendy	Green Archers United	11
2	(Philippines) Phil Younghusband	Loyola	11
4	(Philippines) Jose Porteria	Kaya	10
5	(Philippines) Mark Hartmann	Global	9
5	(Ghana) Jordan Mintah	Stallion	9
5	(Japan) Hikaru Minegishi	Global	9
5	(England) Bradley Grayson	Loyola	9
9	(South Korea) Lee Jeong Woo	Pachanga Diliman/Ceres	8
9	(England) Louis Max Clark	Kaya	8
9	(Saint Kitts and Nevis) Tishan Hanley	Kaya	8
9	(Iran) Hamed Hajimahdi	Pachanga Diliman	8
9	(Philippines) Ruben Doctora	Stallion	8

Correct as of 22:30, 5 August 2015
Source: uflph.com

=== Division 2 ===
Rank	Name	Team	Goals
1	(Japan) Chihiro Noda	JP Voltes	12
2	(Iran) Shayan Jafary Dastjerdi	Laos	9
3	(France) Nicolas Vandelli	Forza	6
3	(Japan) Takashi Odawara	JP Voltes	6
3	(Philippines) Patrik James Franksson	Laos	6
6	(Liberia) Jangobah Johnson	Forza	5
7	(Japan) Yugo Kobayashi	JP Voltes	4
8	(Philippines) Romeo Sydney Gohi	Agila	3
8	(Japan) Yuta Nakagaito	JP Voltes	3
8	(Philippines) John Celiz	JP Voltes	3
8	(Ivory Coast) Cheick Ahmed Camara	Laos	3
8	(Philippines) Jim Ashley Flores	Mendiola	3
8	(Philippines) Renando Mantua, Jr.	JP Voltes	3
8	(Senegal) Amadou Lamine Ngom	Forza	3

Correct as of 23:00, 18 July 2015
Source: uflph.com

== Hat-tricks ==
Division	Player	For	Against	Result	Date
1	(Philippines) Ruben Doctora	Stallion	Team Socceroo	4–1	14 February 2015
1	(Spain) Adrián Gallardo	Ceres	Philippine Army	7–0	3 March 2015
1	(Philippines) Mark Hartmann	Global	Manila Jeepney	10–1	11 April 2015
1	(Spain) Adrián Gallardo	Ceres	Loyola Meralco Sparks	5–2	11 April 2015
1	(Senegal) Robert Lopez Mendy	Green Archers United	Pachanga Diliman	9–5^{‡}	20 June 2015
1	(Spain) Bienvenido Marañón	Ceres	Loyola Meralco Sparks	6–1	20 June 2015
1	(Spain) Adrián Gallardo	Ceres	Pachanga Diliman	5–0^{‡}	23 June 2015
1	(Saint Kitts and Nevis) Tishan Hanley	Kaya	Pachanga Diliman	4–1	11 July 2015
1	(Spain) Adrián Gallardo	Ceres	Green Archers United	7–0	15 July 2015
1	(Philippines) Phil Younghusband	Loyola Meralco Sparks	Pachanga Diliman	5–2	22 July 2015
1	(Saint Kitts and Nevis) Tishan Hanley	Kaya	Team Socceroo	7–0	29 July 2015
2	(Japan) Chihiro Noda	JP Voltes	Mendiola	9–2^{‡}	22 February 2015
2	(Japan) Chihiro Noda	JP Voltes	Kabuscorp De Laguna	7–0^{‡}	26 February 2015
2	(France) Nicolas Vandelli	Forza	Kabuscorp De Laguna	7–1^{‡}	12 March 2015
2	(Japan) Yugo Kobayashi	JP Voltes	Agila	8–0^{‡}	19 March 2015

- ^{‡} Player scored more than three goals

Correct as of 22:00, 29 July 2015
Source: uflph.com

== Discipline ==
=== Division 1 ===
- Most yellow cards (club): 26
  - Philippine Army
- Least yellow cards (club): 10
  - Pachanga Diliman
- Most yellow cards (player): 5
  - Ronel Gener (Philippine Army)
- Most red cards (club): 2
  - Philippine Army^{XY}
  - Team Socceroo^{XY}
- Least red cards (club): 0
  - Pachanga Diliman
  - Stallion
- Most red cards (player): 1
  - Jalsor Soriano (Ceres)^{Y}
  - William Herve Ebanda (Green Archers United)^{Y}
  - Jorge Butron (Kaya)^{Y}
  - Joo Young Lee (Loyola)^{Y}
  - Dexter Chio (Manila Jeepney)^{X}
  - Erwin Silvestre (Philippine Army)^{Y}
  - Lauren Bedua (Philippine Army)^{X}
  - Arnes Casil (Team Socceroo)^{Y}
  - Rogie Maglinas (Team Socceroo)^{X}
- Most red cards (Team Management): 1
  - Jorge Kuriyama (Global GK Coach)^{X}

Note: ^{X} means Straight Red Card; ^{Y} means 2 Yellow Cards

Correct as of 22:30, 18 April 2015
Source: UFL Philippines

=== Division 2 ===
- Most yellow cards (club): -
- Most yellow card (player): -
- Most red cards (club): -
- Most red cards (player): -

Correct as of__:__, __ ______ 2015
Source: UFL Philippines

== Cards and suspension ==
=== Division 1 ===
Ceres (Total: 18 Cards)
Player	Card	Against	Date	Suspended	Date
(Philippines) Martin Steuble	Yellow card	MJP; KAY; STA	2/17/15; 3/14/15; 3/22/15	Green Archers Utd	4/07/15
(Philippines) Martin Steuble	Yellow card	LMS	4/11/15		
(Philippines) Angelo Marasigan	Yellow card	PAC	3/01/15		
(Philippines) Arnie Pasinabo Jr.	Yellow card	PAR	3/03/15		
(Philippines) Jason Sabio	Yellow card	PAR	3/03/15		
(Philippines) Camelo Tacusalme	Yellow card	PAR	3/03/15		
(Philippines) Patrick Reichelt	Yellow card	KAY; STA	3/14/15; 3/22/15		
(Philippines) Marvin Angeles	Yellow card	STA	3/22/15		
(South Korea) Sang Min Kim	Yellow card	GAU; LMS	4/07/15; 04/11/15		
(Philippines) Jalsor Soriano	(yellow card) (yellow-red card)	GAU	4/07/15	Loyola	4/11/15
(Philippines) Manuel Ott	Yellow card	LMS; GLO	4/11/15; 4/18/15		
(Spain) Adrian Gallardo Valdes	Yellow card	GLO	4/18/15		

Global (Total: 16 Cards)
Player	Card	Against	Date	Suspended	Date
(Philippines) Richard Talaroc	Yellow card	GAU	2/07/15		
(Japan) Yu Hoshide	Yellow card	PAC	2/14/15		
(Mexico) Raúl Martinez	Yellow card	PAC; PAR; LMS	2/14/15; 2/28/15; 3/21/15	Manila Jeepney	4/11/15
(Philippines) Amani Aguinaldo	Yellow card	STA; LMS	2/21/15; 3/21/15		
(Japan) Masaki Yanagawa	Yellow card	STA	2/21/15		
(Mexico) Renato González	Yellow card	PAR	2/28/15		
(Philippines) Dennis Villanueva	Yellow card	PAR	2/28/15		
(Japan) Hikaru Minegishi	Yellow card	KAY	3/07/15		
(Philippines) Jerry Barbaso	Yellow card	LMS	3/21/15		
(Philippines) Daisuke Sato	Yellow card	LMS	3/21/15		
(Mexico) Renato Gonzales	Yellow card	MJP; CER	4/11/15; 4/18/15		
(Philippines) Paolo Salenga	Yellow card	MJP	4/11/15		
(Philippines) Mark Hartmann	Yellow card	CER	4/18/15		

Green Archers United (Total: 19 Cards)
Player	Card	Against	Date	Suspended	Date
(Spain) Daniel del Rio	Yellow card	GLO; STA	2/07/15; 4/18/15		
(Philippines) Robert Cañedo	Yellow card	GLO	2/07/15		
(Cameroon) Hervé Ebanda	Yellow card	GLO; KAY; LMS	2/07/15; 2/15/15; 3/15/15	Team Socceroo	3/22/15
(Cameroon) Hervé Ebanda	(yellow card) (yellow-red card)	STA	4/18/15	Global	5/31/15
(Cameroon) Hervé Ebanda	Yellow card	CER	4/04/15		
(Philippines) Reynald Villareal	Yellow card	KAY; SOC; STA	2/15/15; 3/22/15; 4/18/15	Global	5/31/15
(Australia) Jesse Martindale	Yellow card	KAY; LMS	2/15/15; 3/15/15		
(Spain) David Icardo	Yellow card	PAR	2/22/15		
(Senegal) Robert Lopez Mendy	Yellow card	LMS	3/15/15		
(Philippines) Christian Pasilan	Yellow card	LMS	3/15/15		
(Philippines) Tommy Escoltero	Yellow card	SOC	3/22/15		
(Philippines) Paolo Pascual	Yellow card	STA	4/18/15		

Kaya (Total: 16 Cards)
Player	Card	Against	Date	Suspended	Date
(United States) Jorge Butron	(yellow card) (yellow-red card)	STA	4/12/15	Loyola	4/19/15
(United States) Jorge Butron	Yellow card	PAR; CER	2/07/15; 3/14/15		
(Philippines) Miguel Tanton	Yellow card	PAR; CER; PAC	2/07/15; 3/14/15; 3/21/15	Stallion	4/12/15
(England) Louis Clark	Yellow card	GAU; LMS	2/15/15; 3/07/15		
(Philippines) Joshua Beloya	Yellow card	MJP; STA	2/21/15; 4/12/15		
(Ghana) Alfred Osei	Yellow card	LMS; STA	3/07/15; 4/12/15		
(Australia) Richard Greer	Yellow card	CER	3/14/15		
(Philippines) Christopher Greatwich	Yellow card	CER	3/14/15		
(Philippines) James Rochlitz	Yellow card	PAC	3/21/15		

Loyola Meralco Sparks (Total: 15 Cards)
Player	Card	Against	Date	Suspended	Date
(Philippines) James Younghusband	Yellow card	SOC; MJP; GAU	2/08/15; 2/15/15; 3/15/15	Global	3/21/15
(Philippines) Charlie Beaton	Yellow card	PAC	2/22/15		
(Cameroon) Yves Ashime	Yellow card	STA	2/28/15		
(Philippines) Simon Greatwich	Yellow card	STA; GAU; CER	2/28/15; 3/15/15; 4/11/15	Kaya	4/19/15
(England) Adam Mitter	Yellow card	GAU	3/15/15		
(South Korea) Joo Young Lee	(yellow card) (yellow-red card)	GAU	3/15/15	Global	3/21/15
(United States) Anthony Putrus-Schnell	Yellow card	GLO; CER	3/21/15; 4/11/15		
(Philippines) Anton Edward Del Rosario	Yellow card	CER	4/11/15		
(Philippines) Phil Younghusband	Yellow card	CER	4/11/15		

Manila Jeepney (Total: 16 Cards)
Player	Card	Against	Date	Suspended	Date
(Philippines) Chy Villasenor	Yellow card	CER; STA	2/07/15; 3/10/15		
(Philippines) Jake Morallo	Yellow card	CER	2/07/15		
(France) Manuel Chaffort	Yellow card	CER; LMS	2/07/15; 2/15/15		
(Philippines) Peter Fadrigalan	Yellow card	CER; GAU; GLO	2/07/15; 2/28/15; 4/11/15	Team Socceroo	4/18/15
(Spain) Alvaro Alonzo	Yellow card	LMS	2/15/15		
(South Korea) Hyun Don In	Yellow card	LMS	2/15/15		
(Philippines) Dexter Chio	Red card	KAY	2/28/15	Stallion	3/10/15
(South Korea) Su Hyun Park	Yellow card	PAC	3/14/15		
(Philippines) Arnel Amita	Yellow card	GLO; SOC	4/11/15; 4/18/15		
(Ivory Coast) N'gnan Koffi Kouassi	Yellow card	GLO	4/11/15		
(Cameroon) Rodrigue Nembot Talla	Yellow card	SOC	4/18/15		

Pachanga Diliman (Total: 10 Cards)
Player	Card	Against	Date	Suspended	Date
(Philippines) Stephen Permanes	Yellow card	STA	2/08/15		
(Iran) Hossein Doustdarsefidmazgi	Yellow card	STA; GLO	2/08/15; 2/14/15		
(Iran) Ali Mahmoud	Yellow card	GLO; LMS; GAU	2/14/15; 2/22/15; 4/12/15	Philippine Army	4/19/15
(Philippines) Jayson Cutamora	Yellow card	LMS	2/22/15		
(Philippines) Raffy Cabug	Yellow card	SOC; MJP	3/07/15; 3/14/15		
(Philippines) Nathan Octavio	Yellow card	GAU	4/12/15		

Philippine Army (Total: 27 Cards)
Player	Card	Against	Date	Suspended	Date
(Mali) Djibril Sissako	Yellow card	KAY	2/07/15		
(Philippines) Ronel Gener	Yellow card	KAY; GAU; GLO	2/07/15; 2/22/15; 2/28/15	Ceres	3/03/15
(Philippines) Ronel Gener	Yellow card	LMS; SOC	3/03/15; 4/11/15	Pachanga Diliman	4/19/15
(Philippines) Eduardo Gempisaw Jr.	Yellow card	KAY; CFC; STA	2/07/15; 3/03/15; 3/15/15	Manila Jeepney	3/21/15
(South Korea) Yong Ok Choi	Yellow card	KAY; GAU; STA	2/07/15; 2/22/15; 3/15/15	Manila Jeepney	3/21/15
(South Korea) Song Ji Hun	Yellow card	GAU; LMS; STA	2/22/15; 3/07/15; 3/15/15	Manila Jeepney	3/21/15
(Philippines) Lauren Bedua	Yellow card	GAU	2/22/15		
(Philippines) Elmo Pabilona Jr.	Yellow card	GFC; LMS; STA	2/28/15; 3/07/15; 3/15/15	Manila Jeepney	3/21/15
(Philippines) Erwin Silvestre	(yellow card) (yellow-red card)	CFC	3/03/15	Loyola	3/07/15
(Philippines) Rodrigo Betita	Yellow card	LMS; STA	3/07/15; 3/15/15		
(Philippines) Roel Gener	Yellow card	MJP	3/21/15		
(Philippines) Luisito Brillantes	Yellow card	MJP	3/21/15		
(Philippines) Wilson Dela Cruz	Yellow card	SOC	4/11/15		
(Philippines) Lauren Bedua	Red card	SOC	4/11/15	Pachanga Diliman	4/19/15

Stallion (Total: 24 Cards)
Player	Card	Against	Date	Suspended	Date
(Philippines) Shirmar Felongco	Yellow card	PAC; LMS; PAR	2/08/15; 2/28/15; 3/15/15	Ceres	3/22/15
(Philippines) Shirmar Felongco	Yellow card	KAY	4/12/15		
(Philippines) OJ Clariño	Yellow card	PAC; CER; KAY	2/08/15; 3/22/15; 4/12/15	Green Archers Utd	4/18/15
(Philippines) Ruben Doctora	Yellow card	GLO	2/21/15		
(Ghana) Jordan Mintah	Yellow card	GLO; KAY; GAU	2/21/15; 4/12/15; 4/18/15	Pachanga Diliman	5/30/15
(Trinidad and Tobago) Sean Bateau	Yellow card	GLO	2/21/15		
(Andorra) Louis Kaole	Yellow card	GLO; LMS; CER	2/21/15; 2/28/15; 3/22/15	Kaya	4/12/15
(Andorra) Louis Kaole	Yellow card	GAU	4/18/15		
(Philippines) Milan Arends	Yellow card	LMS; PAR; KAY	2/28/15; 3/15/15; 4/12/15	Green Archers Utd	4/18/15
(Philippines) Jose Luis Lozano	Yellow card	MJP	3/10/15		
(Cameroon) Landry Nguene	Yellow card	PAR	3/15/15		
(Cameroon) Christian Nana	Yellow card	CER	3/22/15		
(Philippines) Nathanael Alquiros	Yellow card	GAU	4/18/15		
(Philippines) David Basa	Yellow card	GAU	4/18/15		

Team Socceroo (Total: 18 Cards)
Player	Card	Against	Date	Suspended	Date
(Philippines) Justin Mengane	Yellow card	LMS	2/08/15		
(Philippines) John Michael Navarro	Yellow card	LMS; KAY	2/08/15; 3/17/15		
(Iran) Masood Shadideh	Yellow card	LMS	2/08/15		
(Brazil) Guilherme Hasegawa	Yellow card	STA	2/14/15		
(Philippines) Mandie Lunag	Yellow card	GLO	2/17/15		
(Senegal) Mamadou Sangare	Yellow card	GLO; GAU; MJP	2/17/15; 3/22/15; 4/18/15	Loyola	5/30/15
(Philippines) Paolo Casambre	Yellow card	PAC; PAR	3/07/15; 4/11/15		
(Senegal) Stanley Ankrah	Yellow card	PAC	3/07/15		
(Philippines) Marco Poli	Yellow card	PAC	3/07/15		
(Philippines) Feb Baya	Yellow card	KAY	3/17/15		
(Philippines) Arnel Casil	(yellow card) (yellow-red card)	GAU	3/22/15	Ceres	3/31/15
(Nigeria) Beleu Cleopas	Yellow card	PAR	4/11/15		
(Philippines) Rogie Maglinas	Red card	PAR	4/11/15	Manila Jeepney	4/18/15

Correct as of 22:30, 18 April 2015
Source: UFL Philippines
