= 2011 PFF National Men's U-23 Championship =

Tournament details
- Country: Philippines
- Dates: 21 March – 22 May

Final positions
- Champions: Negros Occidental
- Runners-up: Iloilo

The 2011 PFF National Men's Under-23 Championship (known as the PFF-Suzuki Under-23 Championship for sponsorship reasons) is a football tournament in the Philippines organized by the Philippine Football Federation (PFF) and Japanese automaker Suzuki. It is the first of its kind in the country.

The tournament was announced after the two bodies agreed on a P3.2 million sponsorship deal for the national tournament. It aims to get the finest under-23 players that would represent the country in the upcoming Under-23 Southeast Asian Games (SEA Games) tournament late in 2011.

On 22 May 2011, Negros Occidental defeated Iloilo with a 12–1 aggregate scoreline to win the title.

== The rules ==
The Under-23 Suzuki championship will adopt the rules and guidelines set by the ASEAN Football Federation.

The tournament will be divided into four clusters: National Capital Region, Luzon, Visayas, and Mindanao. The top two of each will advance to the national championship in June 2011. In the Finals, the remaining teams will follow a home-and-away format.

== Schedule ==
- March 21 up to 31 - Visayas and Mindanao Cluster Qualifying Round
- April 11 up to 23 - Regional Qualifiers

== The officials ==
- Mariano Araneta - PFF President
- Satoshi Ochida - Suzuki Philippines representative

== Timeline ==
- Late March to May 2011

== Mission ==
In addition, standout players in the tournament will be considered as part of the national team for the 26th South East Asian Games and the AFF U-23 tournament in July, which both events will happen in Indonesia this year.

== PFF Suzuki Cup Under-23 National Championship ==
=== Quarterfinals ===
Quarterfinals will divided into two groups and two venues, the Laguna group and the Bacolod group.

The University of the Philippines-Los Baños pitch will be the site for the Laguna group that includes host and Luzon second placer Laguna; Mindanao overall leader Davao; NCR Team A, and Visayas’ number two seed, Iloilo.

Panaad Stadium will be the venue for the group of Visayas’ top seed Bacolod, NCR Team B, Mindanao second placer Dipolog, and Luzon topnotcher, Masbate.

Laguna

- All matches were played in University of the Philippines-Los Baños pitch.

Team	Pld	W	D	L	GF	GA	GD	Pts
Iloilo	3	2	1	0	12	2	+10	7
Davao	3	1	1	1	7	6	+1	4
NCR A	3	1	0	2	3	11	−8	3
Laguna	3	0	2	1	3	6	−3	2

- Iloilo and Davao already qualified for semifinals, but there is a protest against Iloilo team.

Bacolod

- All matches were played in the Panaad pitch.

Team	Pld	W	D	L	GF	GA	GD	Pts
Bacolod	3	2	1	0	10	2	+8	7
NCR B	3	2	0	1	8	2	+6	6
Masbate	3	1	1	1	1	1	0	4
Dipolog	3	0	0	3	1	15	−14	0

- Bacolod and NCR B to semi-finals.

=== Knockout stage ===
Semi-Finals
L1	Iloilo	2
B2	NCR B	1
B1	NOFA	3
L2	Davao	2

Finals
L1	Iloilo	1
B1	NOFA	12

==== Semi-finals ====
15 May 2011
14:30 UTC+8

Iloilo	2 – 1	NCR B
Gustilo 7'; Felongco 23'	Report	Melliza 12'

Barotac Nuevo Football Field, Iloilo
16 May 2011
14:30 UTC+8

NOFA	3 – 2	Davao
Beloya; Rayumas; Dolino	Report	Tiboron; Arobo

Panaad Stadium, Bacolod

==== Finals ====
First Leg

19 May 2011
14:00 UTC+8

Iloilo	1 – 3 (aet)	NOFA
Sobremisana 54' (pen.)		Dolino 13'; Dolino; Bedic

Central Philippines University, Iloilo

Second Leg

22 May 2011
18:00 UTC+8

NOFA	9 – 0	Iloilo
Beloya 6', 75'; Gino Palomo 38', 45', 50'; Dolino 21'; Layumas 79', 80'; Morallo 88'

Panaad Stadium, Bacolod

NOFA won 12–1 on aggregate.

=== Awards ===
The following were the competition’s top individual awardees.

- Best Striker: Joshua Beloya (NOFA)
- Most Valuable Player: Aldrin Dolino (NOFA)
- Best Defender: Camelo Tacusalme (NOFA)
- Best Goalkeeper: John Robert Mendoza (NOFA)
- Best Midfielder: Francis Gustilo (Iloilo)
