= Shirmar Felongco =

Filipino footballer

Personal information
- Full name: Shirmar Guanzon Felongco
- Date of birth: April 27, 1993 (age 33)
- Place of birth: Calinog, Iloilo, Philippines
- Position: Right-back

Team information
- Current team: Manila Digger F.C.
- Number: 29

College career
Years	Team	Apps	(Gls)
- University of Santo Tomas

Senior career*
Years	Team	Apps	(Gls)
2012	Pachanga Diliman		
2013–2015	Stallion	18	(0)
2015–2023	Kaya–Iloilo	50	(2)
2023	Stallion Laguna	5	(0)
2024	Bavarians FC		
2024–	Manila Digger	25	(0)

International career
2014	Philippines U21		
2015	Philippines U23	7	(1)
- * Club domestic league appearances and goals

Shirmar Guanzon "Noy" Felongco (born 27 April 1993) is a Filipino professional footballer who plays as a right-back for and captains Philippines Football League club Manila Digger. He has also played for the youth teams of the Philippines.

== Personal life ==
Felongco was born in Calinog, Iloilo.

== Collegiate career ==
Felongco played youth football in the PFF National Men's U-23 Championship in 2011, scoring in the semi-final and leading the team to the final where they lost heavily to NOFA. He also played college football for the University of Santo Tomas. In 2013, he earned the "Best Defender" award as UST lost to De La Salle University in the semifinals in Season 76 of the UAAP.

== Club career ==
=== Pachanga Diliman ===
While still playing college football, he signed for UFL club Pachanga Diliman as the club competed for the first time in the 2012 UFL Division 2, alongside future teammate Jovin Bedic. The club were crowned champions at the season's end.

=== Stallion ===
In 2013, he signed for Stallion FC, also of the United Football League. At the season's end, Stallion won their first-ever (and to date only) national football title. He stayed with them for two more seasons.

=== Kaya ===
At the end of the 2015 United Football League season, it was announced that Felongco would leave Stallion in favor of fellow UFL club Kaya FC, who were competing in the AFC Cup for the first time. He made his first appearance in the AFC Cup in Kaya's 1–0 win over Maldivian side New Radiant.

He stayed with Kaya in 2017 as they renamed to Kaya–Makati and participated in the newly–formed Philippines Football League. In 2018, Kaya moved to the province of Iloilo, the home province of Felongco, and he scored in the club's first-ever match in the province as Kaya tied 1–1 with Ceres-Negros.

In 2021, Kaya qualified for the AFC Champions League for the first time, with Felongco coming off the bench in a 5–0 loss to Viettel FC.

=== Re-signing with Stallion ===
In February 2023, just before the resumption of the 2022–23 PFL season, Kaya announced the departure of Felongco after 7 years at the club. Later that month, it was announced that he would be re-signing for Stallion Laguna, helping the club qualify for the 2023–24 edition of the AFC Cup.

== International career ==
=== Philippines U21 ===
Felongco first played for the Philippines U21 in the 2014 Hassanal Bolkiah Trophy.

=== Philippines U23 ===
In 2015, Felongco was first called up to the U23 team of the Philippines in the 2016 AFC U-23 Championship qualifiers in Thailand. Later that year, he played for the team in the 2015 Southeast Asian Games, scoring his first goal in a 5–1 loss to Myanmar.

=== Philippines ===
In July 2016, Felongco received his first call-up for the Philippine senior team in an unofficial friendly against A-League side Perth Glory. Later that year, he was announced in the final squad for the 2016 AFF Championship, although he did not make an appearance.

== Honors ==
Stallion Laguna

- United Football League: 2013

Kaya–Iloilo

- Copa Paulino Alcantara: 2018, 2021; runner-up: 2019, 2022

Manila Digger

- Philippines Football League: 2025–26
