= 2013 UFL Cup =

2013 United Football Cup
Tournament details
- Country: Philippines
- Dates: October 12 – December 5
- Teams: 23

Final positions
- Champions: Loyola (1st title)
- Runners-up: Pachanga Diliman

Tournament statistics
- Matches played: 58
- Goals scored: 301 (5.19 per match)
- Top goal scorer(s): (Philippines) Phil Younghusband (21 goals)

Awards
- Best player: (Philippines) Phil Younghusband

The 2013 United Football League Cup was the fifth edition of the United Football League Cup. The competition started on October 12 and finished on December 5, 2013.

Stallion were the defending champions.

The UFL Cup opens the new season with the launching of its Fantasy Football Games after UFL has signed a three-year partnership with FanXT. Also, UFL has announced that it has undergone partnership with low-cost airline Tigerair Philippines which will serve as their Official Airline for a year.

On December 5, 2013, Loyola Meralco Sparks defeated Pachanga Diliman with a 3–2 scoreline to win their first ever UFL Cup.

== Competition format ==
In this edition of UFL Cup, total of 27 clubs will compete for the cup after the pullout of Division 1 team Manila Nomads citing the five-foreigners-on-the-field rule issue. This year will also see the return of Cebu Queen City United to the cup competition along with the 8 guest/invited clubs which include the defending PFF National Men's Club Championship titleholders Ceres. The groups with five teams will see their top three enter the knockout round-of-16 stage, while the groups with four clubs will have their top two assured of passage, plus the best third-placer.

From the 27-team competition, it was later reduced to 23 teams after Division 1 team Pasargad together with three guest/invited clubs Manila Tala FC, Mendiola United and Manila Hurricanes FC decided to withdraw their participation in the Cup citing their inability to field a competitive team. Due to their withdrawal to the tournament, the UFL redrawn teams and the format of having 6 groups was changed to 5 wherein five teams comprised groups A, C and E while four teams were featured in groups B and D. The top three teams of each group will be advancing to the Knockout Round-of-16 stage and the highest ranked fourth-placed team among the five groups will be the sixteenth team to qualify.

== Rules on foreign players ==
For the 2013/14 UFCA (UFL) Football Season, the UFL Executive Committee has decided to implement a Foreign Player Rule. A club may only field in a maximum of five foreign players on the pitch at any given time. Of the six remaining players on the pitch, two may still be foreigners provided that they are permanent residents of the Philippines for at least five years.

== Group stage ==
Key to colours in group tables
Group winners, Runners-up and Third-placed team advance to the knock out stage
Qualified for Best Ranked Fourth-placed team that will advance to the knock out stage

All times are Philippine Standard Time (PST) – UTC+8.

=== Group A ===
Team	Pld	W	D	L	GF	GA	GD	Pts
Ceres	4	3	0	1	14	1	+11	9
Pachanga Diliman	4	2	1	1	11	3	+8	7
Manila Jeepney	4	2	1	1	7	7	0	7
Philippine Army	4	1	1	2	4	10	−6	4
Laos	4	0	1	3	3	16	−13	1

12 October 2013	Pachanga	4 – 0	Laos	Emperador Stadium
18:00 UTC+8	Amirkhizan, Reza 5'; Appiah, Ernest 12'; Diop, Ousseynou 16'; Nate Burkey 49'	Report

12 October 2013	Ceres	6 – 1	Manila Jeepney	Emperador Stadium
20:00 UTC+8	Conmigo, Jaymile 30' (o.g.); Olaniyi, Samson 58', 81'; Joshua Beloya 63'; Poderoso, Jaime 83'; Kim Jin Ho 90' (pen.)	Report	Iliff, Sean 75'

15 October 2013	Laos	0 – 3	Manila Jeepney	Emperador Stadium
19:00 UTC+8		Report	Shadideh Masood 44', 55'; Iliff, Sean 84'

15 October 2013	Pachanga Diliman	5 – 0	Philippine Army	Emperador Stadium
21:00 UTC+8	Nate Burkey 24', 32', 43'; Zerrudo, Ariel 29'; Amirkhizan, Reza 49'	Report

20 October 2013	Manila Jeepney	2 – 0	Philippine Army	Emperador Stadium
18:00 UTC+8	Sean Iliff 60', 78'	Report

20 October 2013	Ceres	6 – 0	Laos	Emperador Stadium
18:00 UTC+8	Jayson Panhay 17', 36'; Jin Ho Kim 19', 87'; Beloya 39'; Angelo Marasigan 79'	Report

26 October 2013	Ceres	0 – 1	Philippine Army	Emperador Stadium
18:00 UTC+8		Report	Meliton Pelayo 38'

26 October 2013	Manila Jeepney	1 – 1	Pachanga Diliman	Emperador Stadium
20:00 UTC+8	Sean Iliff 75'	Report	Nate Burkey 21'

29 October 2013	Ceres	2 – 1	Pachanga Diliman	Emperador Stadium
19:00 UTC+8	Jin Ho Kim 34'; Jalsor Soriano 41'	Report	Ariel Zerrudo 57'

29 October 2013	Laos	3 – 3	Philippine Army	Emperador Stadium
21:00 UTC+8	Mohammad Ghasemi 9', 17'; Patrik James Franksson 23'	Report	Nestorio Margarse 49'; Jeoffrey Lobaton 52'; Romano Vestal 68'

=== Group B ===
Team	Pld	W	D	L	GF	GA	GD	Pts
Union Internacional Manila	3	3	0	0	11	6	+5	9
Kaya	3	2	0	1	13	4	+9	6
Cimarron	3	0	1	2	2	6	−4	1
Manila All-Japan	3	0	1	2	1	11	−10	1

13 October 2013	Cimarron	2 – 3	Union Internacional Manila	Emperador Stadium
18:00 UTC+8	Permanes, Ralph 79'; Ucang, Jusua 88'	Report	Jafari Dastjerdi Shayan 36', 90+2'; Hajimhedi Hamed 40'

17 October 2013	Kaya	7 – 0	Manila All-Japan	Emperador Stadium
21:00 UTC+8	del Rosario 25'; Danilo De Jong 42'; Emmanuel Mbata 44'; Antonio Ugarte 57'; Kenshiro Daniels 73'; Mitchell Davidson 77', 88'	Report

23 October 2013	Kaya	3 – 0	Cimarron	Emperador Stadium
19:00 UTC+8	Mitchell Davidson 40'; Kenshiro Daniels 45+1'; Greatwich 70'	Report

23 October 2013	Manila All-Japan	1 – 4	Union Internacional Manila	Emperador Stadium
21:00 UTC+8	Eiji Sugisaki 79'	Report	Fidelis Nnabuife 7', 53'; Muhamed Hassan 57', 77'

6 November 2013	Manila All-Japan	0 – 0	Cimarron	Emperador Stadium
21:00 UTC+8		Report

9 November 2013	Union Internacional Manila	4 – 3	Kaya	Emperador Stadium
20:00 UTC+8	Mahmoud Ali 3'; Fidelis Nnabuife 14'; Hamed Hajimhedi 28'; Shayan Jafari 43'	Report	Kenshiro Daniels 27'; Masa Omura 67'; Janrick Soriano 89'

=== Group C ===
Team	Pld	W	D	L	GF	GA	GD	Pts
Stallion	4	3	0	1	8	5	+3	9
Cebu Queen City United	4	2	1	1	9	4	+6	7
Philippine Air Force	4	2	0	2	6	7	−1	6
Agila	4	1	1	2	2	5	−3	4
Bright Star FC	4	0	2	2	5	9	−4	2

13 October 2013	Bright Star FC	1 – 1	Agila	Emperador Stadium
14:00 UTC+8	Sissako Mahamadou 62'	Report	Stanley Ajah 16'

13 October 2013	Cebu Queen City United	3 – 0	Philippine Air Force	Emperador Stadium
16:00 UTC+8	Kabulo Pintho 8', 28'; Camara, Ahmed 19'	Report

16 October 2013	Stallion	1 – 0	Agila	Emperador Stadium
19:00 UTC+8	Zamora, Cesar 47'	Report

16 October 2013	Cebu Queen City United	2 – 2	Bright Star FC	Emperador Stadium
21:00 UTC+8	Camara, Ahmed 30'; Apurado, Siegfred 49'	Report	Acampado, Mark 17'; Sissako Mahamadou 33'

20 October 2013	Philippine Air Force	3 – 1	Bright Star FC	Emperador Stadium
14:00 UTC+8	Araneta 9', 74'; Rodolf Bebanco 33'	Report	Jayson Delos Santos 53'

20 October 2013	Stallion	1 – 4	Cebu Queen City United	Emperador Stadium
14:00 UTC+8	Benjamin Gordon 86'	Report	Ahmed Camara 50'; Pintho Kabulo 72'; Junard Aguilar 76', 86'

27 October 2013	Bright Star FC	1 – 3	Stallion	Emperador Stadium
18:00 UTC+8	Vaseeba Toure 43'	Report	Ruben Doctora 9'; Bo Bae Park 20'; Jeremy Hohn 89'

27 October 2013	Agila	0 – 3	Philippine Air Force	Emperador Stadium
20:00 UTC+8		Report	Araneta 5'; Neckson Leonora 15'; Randy Bela-ong 86'

5 November 2013	Philippine Air Force	0 – 3 PAF abandoned the match	Stallion	Emperador Stadium
19:00 UTC+8		Report

5 November 2013	Agila	1 – 0	Cebu Queen City United	Emperador Stadium
21:00 UTC+8	Wanyou Vagbe 9'	Report

=== Group D ===
Team	Pld	W	D	L	GF	GA	GD	Pts
Global	3	3	0	0	16	1	+15	9
Forza	3	2	0	1	3	4	−1	6
General Trias	3	1	0	2	2	6	−4	3
Team Socceroo	3	0	0	3	1	11	−10	0

13 October 2013	Forza	2 – 0	Team Socceroo	Emperador Stadium
20:00 UTC+8	Pacquiao, Gerald 29'; Johnson, Jangobah 71'	Report

17 October 2013	General Trias	0 – 5	Global	Emperador Stadium
19:00 UTC+8		Report	Izzo El Habbib 9'; Angel Guirado 12', 28', 71'; Aaron Altiche 89'

24 October 2013	General Trias	2 – 0	Team Socceroo	Emperador Stadium
19:00 UTC+8	Shin Seok Jeon 4'; Cristituto Pino 36'	Report

24 October 2013	Global	4 – 0	Forza	Emperador Stadium
21:00 UTC+8	Izzo El Habbib 14', 50', 52'; Mark Hartmann 23'	Report

4 November 2013	Team Socceroo	1 – 7	Global	Emperador Stadium
16:00 UTC+8	Danstin Muraoka 90+2'	Report	Christiaens 4', 28', 55'; Izzo El Habbib 40', 45+1', 78'; Jason De Jong 53'

6 November 2013	Forza	1 – 0	General Trias	Emperador Stadium
19:00 UTC+8	Jangobah Johnson 85'	Report

=== Group E ===
Team	Pld	W	D	L	GF	GA	GD	Pts
Loyola	4	4	0	0	61	0	+61	12
Green Archers United	4	3	0	1	26	3	+23	9
Navy	4	2	0	2	12	15	−3	6
Dolphins United	4	1	0	3	12	23	−11	3
Blue Guards	4	0	0	4	1	71	−70	0

19 October 2013	Loyola	16 – 0	Dolphins United	Emperador Stadium
18:00 UTC+8	J.Younghusband 10', 29', 70'; Gould 35', 43', 47'; Samuel Bonney 41'; Robert Cañedo 52'; Lee Joo Young 45+1'; Jake Morallo 56', 67', 73'; Alex Elnar 74'; Dorlas 77'; Arnel Amita 80', 83'	Report

19 October 2013	Green Archers United	17 – 0	Blue Guards	Emperador Stadium
20:00 UTC+8	Caligdong 2', 4', 40'; Jesse Martindale 9', 38', 60'; Patrick Bocobo 12'; Gabriel Olowoyeye 16'; Jesus Melliza 58', 63', 66', 70', 72'; Shag Shapay Johnson 77'; Reynald Villareal 81', 82'; Ronnie Aguisanda 87'	Report

22 October 2013	Dolphins United	0 – 4	Green Archers United	Emperador Stadium
19:00 UTC+8		Report	Gabriel Olowoyeye 2'; Jesus Melliza 13'; Caligdong 17'; Jesse Martindale 55'

22 October 2013	Blue Guards	0 – 10	Navy	Emperador Stadium
21:00 UTC+8		Report	Richard Leyble 14'; Noel Reyes 30' (o.g.); Arnaldo Montana 42'; Friday Okoro 45', 57'; Rachy Gunda 53'; Mohamed Diallo 60', 73'; Arnold Carino 66'; Gary Viliran 88'

27 October 2013	Dolphins United	11 – 1	Blue Guards	Emperador Stadium
14:00 UTC+8	Abdou Moussa Obono 1', 8', 44'; Anthony Delante 17'; Jerome Cuyos 25', 71'; John Caballero 47'; Enow Lewis 64'; Jerad Baron 77'; Georg Bragas 81' (o.g.); Bryan Baleos 89'	Report	Roger Sulit 32'

27 October 2013	Loyola	9 – 0	Navy	Emperador Stadium
16:00 UTC+8	Gould 23'; P.Younghusband 48', 49', 59', 67', 72', 76'; Robert Cañedo 64'; Jake Morallo 88'	Report

30 October 2013	Blue Guards	0 – 33	Loyola	Emperador Stadium
19:00 UTC+8		Report	Samuel Bonney 1'; P.Younghusband 2', 11', 19', 28', 62', 69', 80', 90'; Hartmann 8', 17', 18', 46', 55'; J.Younghusband 13', 22', 26', 56', 78'; Robert Cañedo 15'; Joo Young Lee 16', 33', 41'; Gould 48', 57', 66', 68', 79', 82', 87'; Jake Morallo 54', 64'; Greatwich 85'

30 October 2013	Navy	0 – 5	Green Archers United	Emperador Stadium
21:00 UTC+8		Report	Reynald Villareal 14'; Pasilan 23', 30'; Jesse Martindale 84'; Robert Mendy 90+1'

7 November 2013	Navy	2 – 1	Dolphins United	Emperador Stadium
19:00 UTC+8	Friday Okoro 20', 83'	Report	Abdou Moussa Obono 16'

7 November 2013	Green Archers United	0 – 3	Loyola	Emperador Stadium
21:00 UTC+8		Report	Hartmann 50'; Gould 83'; Arnel Amita 89'

=== Ranking of Groups' Fourth-placed team ===
The best ranked fourth-placed team among the groups will qualify for the Knock-out Round-of-16 Stage. In the groups of 5, the matches between the 4th placed and the bottom-placed team were not considered for games played calculation.

They are determined by the parameters in this order:

1. Highest number of points
2. Goal difference
3. Highest number of goals scored (goals for)

Grp	Team	Pld	W	D	L	GF	GA	GD	Pts
C	Agila	3	1	0	2	1	4	−3	3
A	Philippine Army	3	1	0	2	1	7	−6	3
B	Manila All-Japan	3	0	1	2	1	11	−10	1
D	Team Socceroo	3	0	0	3	1	11	−10	0
E	Dolphins United	3	0	0	3	1	22	−21	0

== Knockout stage ==
Round of 16

Quarter-finals

Semi-finals

Final

November 21 – Taguig

Green Archers United
6

November 26 – Taguig

Manila Jeepney
2

Green Archers United
2

November 14 – Taguig

Ceres
1

Agila
2

December 3 – Taguig

Ceres
7

Green Archers United
0

November 21 – Taguig

Loyola
2

Global
8

November 26 – Taguig

Philippine Navy
0

Global
0

November 19 – Taguig

Loyola
2

Cimarron
0

December 5 – Taguig

Loyola
10

Loyola
3

November 19 – Taguig

Pachanga Diliman
2

Philippine Air Force
1

November 28 - Taguig

Kaya
0

Philippine Air Force
1

November 12 – Taguig

Union Internacional Manila
0

Union Internacional Manila
4

December 3 – Taguig

General Trias
1

Philippine Air Force
2

November 14 – Taguig

Pachanga Diliman
3

Third place

Stallion
2

November 28 – Taguig

December 5 – Taguig

Cebu Queen City United
0

Stallion
3
Green Archers United
3

November 12 – Taguig

Pachanga Diliman
5

Philippine Air Force
0

Forza
0 (3)

Pachanga Diliman
0 (4)

=== Round of 16 ===
November 12, 2013	Union Internacional Manila	4 – 1	General Trias	Emperador Stadium
17:15 UTC+8	Shayan Jafari Dastjerdi 55', 58', 75'; Muhamed Hassan 87'	Report	Song Woo 61'

November 12, 2013	Forza	0 – 0 (a.e.t.) (3 – 4 p)	Pachanga Diliman	Emperador Stadium
20:30 UTC+8		Report
	Penalties
	David Adebanjo (penalty scored); Arvin Gaspe (penalty missed); Jangobah Johnson (penalty scored); Luis Celdran (penalty scored); Elle Cagayanan (penalty missed)		(penalty scored) Burkey; (penalty scored) Anto Gonzales; (penalty scored) Daniel Gadia; (penalty scored) Jayson Cutamora

November 14, 2013	Stallion	2 – 0	Cebu Queen City United	Emperador Stadium
17:15 UTC+8	Bo Bae Park 15'; Ruben Doctora Jr. 27'	Report

November 14, 2013	Agila	2 – 7	Ceres	Emperador Stadium
20:30 UTC+8	Olayemi Victor Bakare 11', 18'	Report	Younousse Yaogo 16'; Jayson Panhay 35', 58'; Jin Ho Kim 49'; Byeong Jun Yoon 66'; Beloya 74'; Hwa Seo Park 90+3'

November 19, 2013	Philippine Air Force	1 – 0 (a.e.t.)	Kaya	Emperador Stadium
17:15 UTC+8	Jimmy Vergara Jr. 104'	Report

November 19, 2013	Cimarron	0 – 10	Loyola	Emperador Stadium
20:30 UTC+8		Report	J.Younghusband 4', 77'; Gould 16', 40'; Lee Joo Young 20'; P.Younghusband 23', 66', 92'; Hartmann 74'; Yves de Luis 10(o.g.)'

November 21, 2013	Green Archers United	6 – 2	Manila Jeepney	Emperador Stadium
17:15 UTC+8	Agbayomi Gabriel Olowoyeye 6'; Arnie Pasinabo 12'; Caligdong 40'; Pasilan 54'; Jesse Martindale 77'; Michael Garcia 87'	Report	Mamadou Sangare 48'; Chris Arceo 68'

November 21, 2013	Global	8 – 0	Philippine Navy	Emperador Stadium
20:30 UTC+8	Christiaens 5'; Hartmann 12', 16', 53'; El Habbib 32' de Jong 61'; Aaron Altiche 82'; Guirado 86'	Report

=== Quarter-finals ===
November 26, 2013	Green Archers United	2 – 1	Ceres	Emperador Stadium
17:15 UTC+8	Caligdong 33', 90+2'	Report	Jayson Panhay 28'

November 26, 2013	Global	0 – 2	Loyola	Emperador Stadium
20:30 UTC+8		Report	P.Younghusband 58'; Hartmann 76'

November 28, 2013	Philippine Air Force	1 – 0 (a.e.t.)	Union Internacional Manila	Emperador Stadium
17:15 UTC+8	Jimmy Vergara Jr. 117'	Report

November 28, 2013	Stallion	3 – 5	Pachanga Diliman	Emperador Stadium
20:30 UTC+8	Mario Javier Clarino 18'; Junior Muñoz 32'; Ruben Doctora Jr. 67'	Report	Andrew Santiago 1', 64'; Oussenynou Diop 6'; Reza Amirkhizan 51'; Ariel Zerrudo 82'

=== Semi-finals ===
December 3, 2013	Green Archers United	0 – 2	Loyola	Emperador Stadium
17:15 UTC+8		Report	P.Younghusband 14', 58'

December 3, 2013	Philippine Air Force	2 – 3 (a.e.t.)	Pachanga Diliman	Emperador Stadium
20:30 UTC+8	Araneta 28'; Jezurel Tonog 95'	Report	Burkey 29'; Ariel Zerrudo Jr. 91'; Reza Amirkhizan 112'

=== Third-place playoff ===
December 5, 2013	Green Archers United	3 – 0	Philippine Air Force	Emperador Stadium
17:15 UTC+8	Nicolas Leonora Jr. 9' (o.g.); Caligdong 51', 57'	Report

=== Final ===
December 5, 2013	Loyola	3 – 2	Pachanga Diliman	Emperador Stadium
20:30 UTC+8	J.Younghusband 19'; Gould 45'; P.Younghusband 52'	Report	Ariel Zerrudo Jr. 16', 53'

== Loyola Meralco Sparks-Blue Guards match ==
Last October 30, 2013, Loyola Meralco Sparks and Blue Guards played each other in the tournament at the Emperador Stadium, Fort Bonifacio, Taguig, Philippines. It surpassed the largest winning margin in international association football which is a 31–0 victory of Australia against American Samoa and three goals shy of a 36–0 win of Arbroath over Bon Accord.

Loyola defeated Blue Guards by a margin of 33 goals making a new record and the most lopsided match in the history of the United Football League since it began a semi-professional league in 2009.

The match has received many reactions. Many suggested that there must be a screening next year for new clubs.

== Top goalscorers ==
Rank	Player	Club	Goals
1	(Philippines) Phil Younghusband	Loyola	21
2	(Philippines) Chad Gould	Loyola	15
3	(Philippines) James Younghusband	Loyola	11
4	(Philippines) Matthew Hartmann	Loyola	9
4	(Philippines) Chieffy Caligdong	Green Archers United	9

Correct as of 11:30, December 5, 2013

== Awards ==
The following were the competition’s top individual awardees.

- Golden Gloves: (Ghana) Baba Sampana (Loyola)
- Golden Boot: (Philippines) Phil Younghusband (Loyola)
- Golden Ball: (Philippines) Phil Younghusband (Loyola)
- Fair Play Awards: Global
