= Kabuscorp De Laguna F.C. =

Kabuscorp De Laguna
- Full name: Kabuscorp De Laguna Football Club
- League: UFL Division 2
- 2015: Withdrew from the league

The Kabuscorp De Laguna Football Club or Kabuscorp De Laguna is an association football club based in the Laguna, Philippines. They played in the Second Division of the United Football League first featuring in the 2015 season.

Zeferino Fielda Silva and Angel Chan was behind the conception of the football club.

== See also ==
- Kabuscorp Sport Clube do Palanca – a related sporting club in Angola.
