= Hanif Hamir =

Bruneian footballer

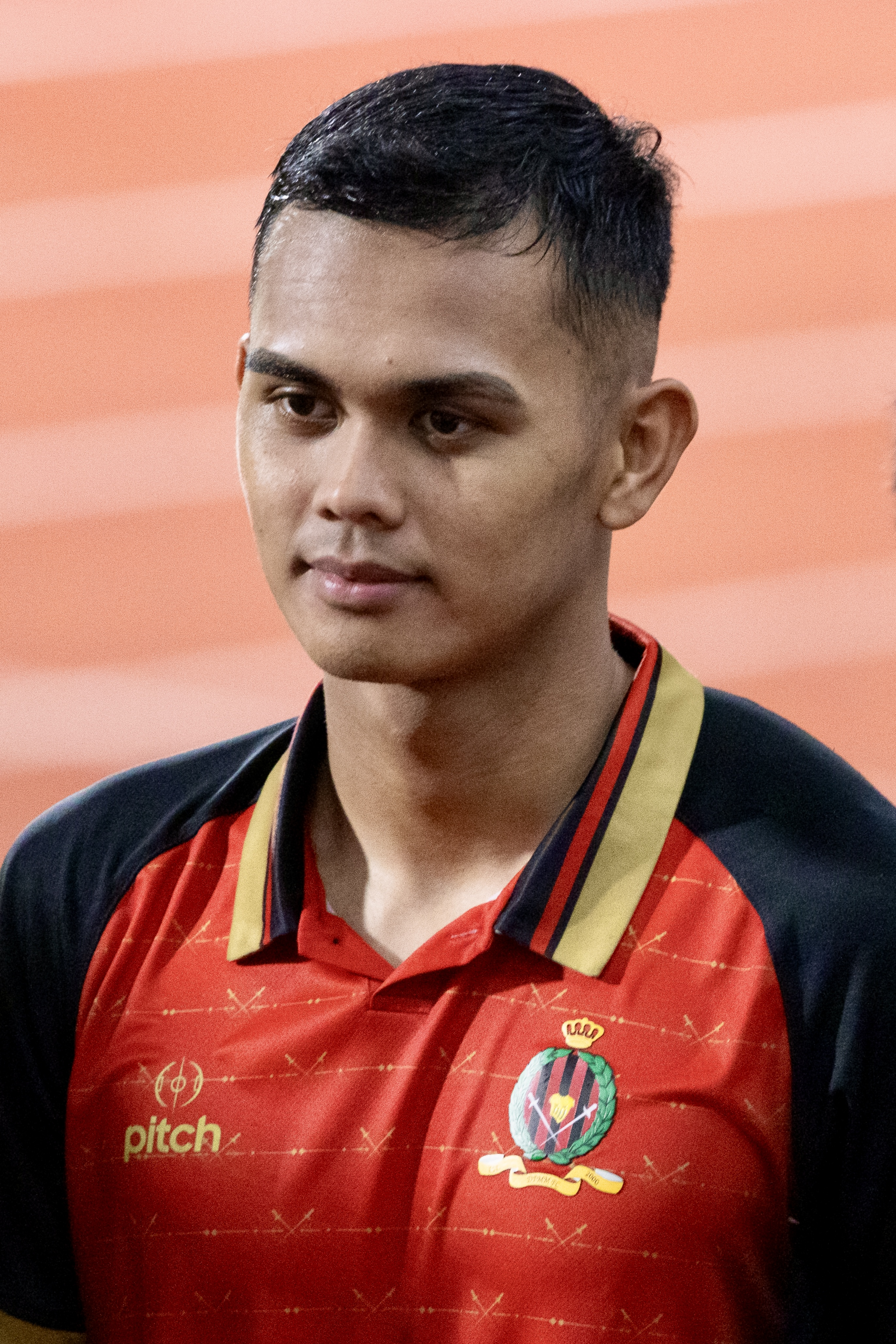
- Hanif with DPMM in 2024

Personal information
- Full name: Muhammad Hanif @ Abdul Hadi bin Hamir
- Date of birth: 22 February 1997 (age 29)
- Place of birth: Brunei
- Height: 1.84 m (6 ft 0 in)
- Position: Centre-back

Team information
- Current team: DPMM FC
- Number: 13

Youth career
- Sports School
- 2015: DPMM U19

Senior career*
Years	Team	Apps	(Gls)
2014	Najip		(0)
2015	Tabuan U18		(0)
2015–2016	Tabuan Muda		(1)
2017–2019	DPMM	20	(0)
2021–	DPMM	40	(1)

International career^{‡}
2014	Brunei U21	1	(0)
2015–2019	Brunei U23	8	(0)
2015	Brunei U19	5	(0)
2015–	Brunei	29	(0)
- * Club domestic league appearances and goals as of 26 October 2025 ‡ National team caps and goals as of 30 September 2026

Muhammad Hanif @ Abdul Hadi bin Hamir (born 22 February 1997) is a Bruneian professional footballer who plays as a defender for DPMM FC and the Brunei national team.

== Club career ==
Hanif is a graduate of Brunei's Sports School, the institution that also produced Bruneian internationals such as Azwan Ali Rahman and Shafie Effendy. He began his league football career with Najip FC in 2014, a team that lost every game in their previous season. Coached by the late Johari Bungsu, Hanif achieved a third-place finish with Najip FC in the 2014 Brunei Super League and also reached the final of the FA Cup that season, scoring the winner in the semi-final along the way.

Brunei's football association NFABD created Tabuan Muda in 2015, a league team that serves to prepare for international tournaments, mirroring Singapore's Young Lions and Malaysia's Harimau Muda teams. Hanif was assigned to the Under-18s playing in the Brunei Premier League at the start of the season, however he was promoted to the Brunei Super League team in the second half of the season. Tabuan Muda finished fifth in the 2015 and 2016 seasons of the BSL.

Hanif trialled out for and joined Brunei DPMM FC's Under-19 team in early 2015. Although he was overlooked for promotion in 2016, he was handed a professional contract by Steve Kean to play for DPMM in the S.League in 2017. He signed full terms on 15 January. He made his debut in the 4–0 loss against Albirex Niigata FC (S) on 16 June.

Hanif made eight league appearances for DPMM in the 2019 season en route to the championship, his first with the professional club. He left DPMM at the end of the season.

Hanif re-signed for DPMM before the 2021 Brunei Super League began on 11 June 2021. A year later, he won the Brunei FA Cup after beating Kasuka FC in the final on 4 December 2022.

After DPMM returned to the Singapore Premier League in 2023, Hanif scored the winner against Tanjong Pagar United on 15 March at Jalan Besar Stadium in a 2–1 victory.

== International career ==
Hanif has been playing for the national team and its various youth teams since 2014. His youth tournaments include the 2014 Hassanal Bolkiah Trophy for Under-21, the 28th SEA Games for Under-23, the 2015 AFF U-19 Youth Championship and the 2016 AFC U-19 Championship qualification with the Under-19s.

Hanif was called up to the national team for the 2018 World Cup qualifiers against Chinese Taipei in March 2015. He started both games at centre-back in a 1-2 aggregate loss which eliminated Brunei from the 2018 World Cup.

Hanif played in a 6-1 drubbing by Cambodia in a friendly on 3 November 2015. His next callup was at the 2016 AFF Suzuki Cup qualification matches held in Cambodia in October, and started all three matches. He missed out on the 2016 AFC Solidarity Cup squad a fortnight later due to injury.

In 2017, Hanif was announced as one of Brunei's athletes for the year's SEA Games football tournament held in Malaysia in August, playing with the under-23s. However he was replaced by Nadzri Erwan on the eve of the biennial sporting event.

Hanif was appointed captain of the Brunei Under-23 squad for the 2020 AFC U-23 Championship qualification matches that was held in Vietnam in late March 2019. They finished with three losses in three games.

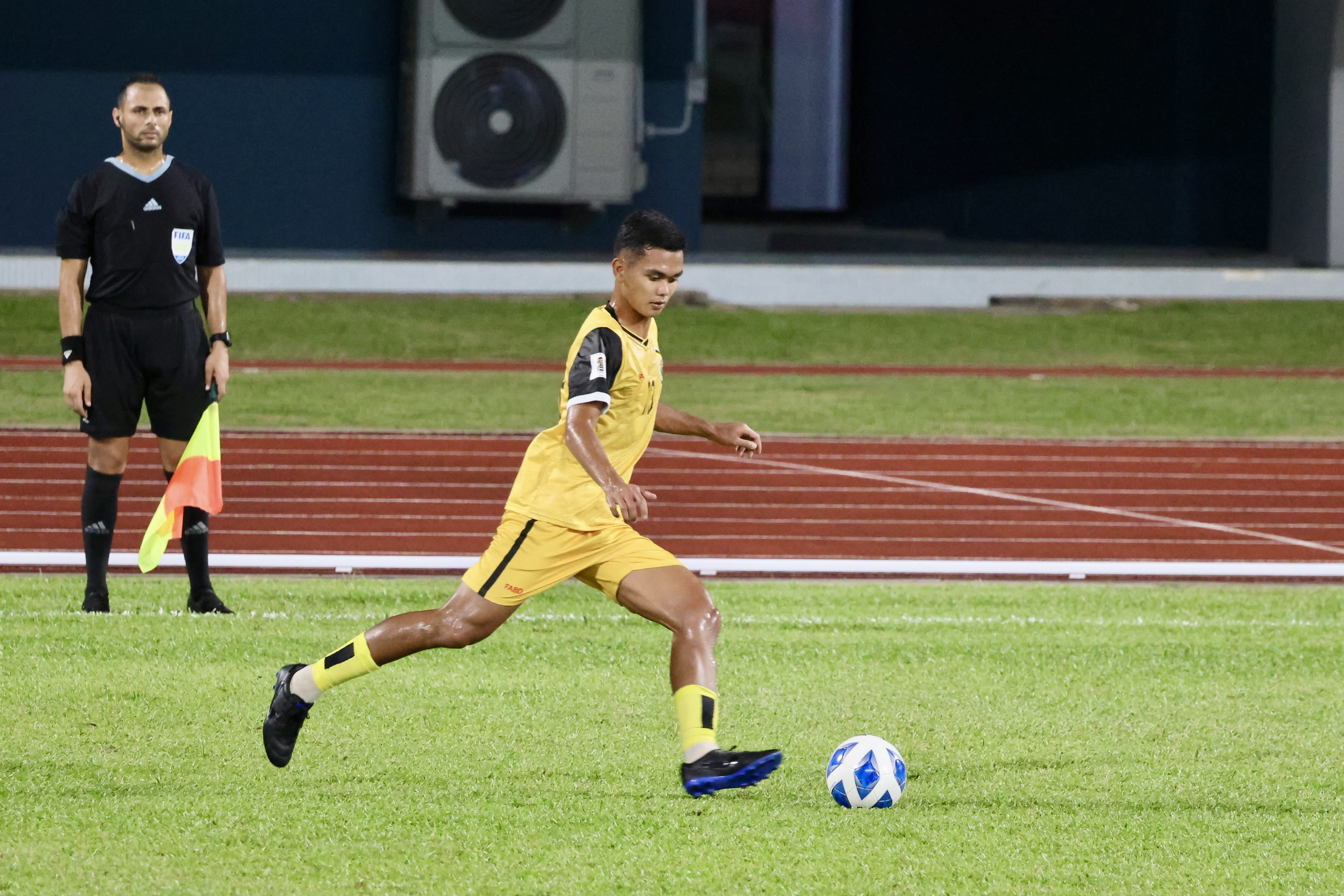
Hanif playing against Indonesia during the 2026 FIFA World Cup qualification

Yet to register an appearance in the 2019 Singapore Premier League, Hanif accepted a callup to the senior national team for the two-legged 2022 World Cup qualification matches against Mongolia in June of that year. He was deployed by Robbie Servais as a starter in both games alongside captain Sairol Sahari at centre-back. In the first leg, he was at the short end of a weak backpass by Helmi Zambin for the crucial second Mongolia goal. The second match was also eventful for Hanif as he was the one who felled Narmandakh Artag inside the penalty box that led to a Mongolia penalty scored by Tsedenbal Norjmoo. Brunei were beaten 2–3 on aggregate and failed to progress to Round 2 of the qualification process.

Hanif was selected and started the friendly match away against Laos on 27 March 2022 which ended in a 3–2 loss. Later in the year, he was retained for a tri-nation tournament in late September involving the Maldives and Laos and played in both fixtures. That December, he was selected for the Brunei squad for the 2022 AFF MItsubishi Electric Cup in their second ever appearance at the level since 1996. He was brought in as an early substitute against Thailand in a 0–5 defeat in the first group game. He then started the third game against Indonesia where he suffered an injury early in the game and was taken off.

Hanif was selected for the Brunei national team at the 2026 World Cup qualifying matches against Indonesia held in October 2023 over two legs. He played the full 180 minutes in a 0–12 aggregate loss to their Southeast Asian compatriots.

Hanif was fielded by caretaker head coach Rui Capela for two friendlies against Sri Lanka in June 2024. That following October, he was selected for the 2024 ASEAN Championship qualification two-legged affair against Timor-Leste, and made a second-half appearance in the second leg that finished 0–0.

On 25 March 2025, Hanif was deployed by new national team tactician Fabio Maciel to start the first group game of the 2027 AFC Asian Cup qualification against Lebanon in Qatar. The Wasps were defeated 5–0. After a 1–0 friendly defeat on 5 June to Sri Lanka away in Bangkok where he was utilised as a substitute, Maciel reinstated him in central defence and gave him the armband for the second Asian Cup qualifying group game at home against Bhutan and this time the Wasps came out as 2–1 victors. Hanif was kept in the backline against Yemen in the two games that were for the Asian Cup qualification in October 2025, but a poor showing by the Wasps resulted in two defeats home and away.

On 31 March 2026, Hanif partnered Nurikhwan Othman as the starting centre-backs against Bhutan in the final fixture of the Asian Cup qualification, and the Wasps were beaten 2–1 in the game. The following June, Hanif reprised his starting role under Ali Mustafa for the 2026 ASEAN Championship qualification games against Timor-Leste. Unfortunately he could not prevent the Crocs from scoring three times in each match, eliminating Brunei from the Hyundai Cup. In the 2026 FIFA ASEAN Cup Division 2 that was held in Hong Kong that September, Hanif started both group games against Laos and the host nation where he was sent off in the latter match for a dangerous tackle on Matt Orr.

== Honours ==
DPMM FC

- Singapore Premier League: 2019
- Brunei FA Cup: 2022
