= Chad Gould =

Filipino footballer

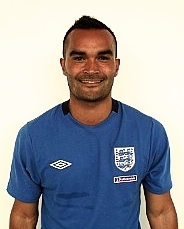

Personal information
- Full name: Chad Edward Alesna Gould
- Date of birth: September 30, 1982 (age 44)
- Place of birth: Cebu City, Philippines
- Height: 1.85 m (6 ft 1 in)
- Positions: Striker; defender

Youth career
- Bournemouth
- Southampton

Senior career*
Years	Team	Apps	(Gls)
2001–2003	Swanage Town & Herston		
2007–2008	AFC Wimbledon		
2012–2014	Loyola Meralco Sparks		

International career^{‡}
2005	Philippines U-23	3	(1)
2004–2010	Philippines	12	(6)
2010	England (beach soccer)	17	(10)
- * Club domestic league appearances and goals as of June 6, 2013 ‡ National team caps and goals as of January 16, 2010

Chad Edward Alesna Gould (born September 30, 1982) is a Filipino former footballer who played as a central defender or striker for the Loyola Meralco Sparks and the Philippines national team. He is currently a FIFA Licensed Football agent. He previously was also a music artist signed by Warner Music Philippines. In December 2021, his song "Daisy" was played on BBC Music Introducing Show.

== Honours ==
=== Club ===
Loyola Meralco Sparks

- United Football League Cup: 2013

== Early life and education ==
Gould was born on 30 September 1982 in Cebu City, Philippines and grew up in England.

He studied at Brunel University where he obtained a degree in sports science.

== Football career ==
=== Youth ===
He spent his youth career with Bournemouth and Southampton.

=== Club ===
He was part of the reserves team of AFC Wimbledon during the 2007–08 season making reserve league appearances and a single reserve cup appearance. He scored four goals for the reserve team. He left the club on 22 September 2008.

In 2012, he joined the Loyola Meralco Sparks F.C. of the United Football League. With the club, Gould won the 2013 UFL Cup. He was also part of Loyola's squad that participated in the 2013 Menpora Cup in Indonesia. He left Loyola after two seasons.

Chad is currently a free agent.

=== International ===
Gould first appeared for the Philippines in the 2004 Tiger Cup, playing in two matches. His debut came in the 4–1 defeat to Malaysia where he scored the Philippines' only goal.

In 2006, Gould took a break from football, but returned to the national team in 2008 play until 2010.

He was later selected to play for the England national beach soccer team after he was scouted playing in a tournament organised by Nuts magazine.

=== International goals ===
Scores and results list the Philippines' goal tally first.

#	Date	Venue	Opponent	Score	Result	Competition
1.	10 December 2004	Bukit Jalil National Stadium, Kuala Lumpur	Malaysia	1–4	1–4	2004 AFF Championship
2.	17 May 2008	Barotac Nuevo Plaza Field, Barotac Nuevo	Bhutan	1–0	3–0	2008 AFC Challenge Cup qualifier
3.	19 October 2008	Phnom Penh Olympic Stadium, Phnom Penh	Brunei	1–1	1–1	2008 AFF Suzuki Cup qualifier
4.	23 October 2008	Phnom Penh Olympic Stadium, Phnom Penh	Cambodia	3–2	3–2	2008 AFF Suzuki Cup qualifier
5.	14 April 2009	Rasmee Dhandu Stadium, Malé	Bhutan	1–0	1–0	2010 AFC Challenge Cup qualifier
6.	16 April 2009	Rasmee Dhandu Stadium, Malé	Maldives	2–3	2–3	2010 AFC Challenge Cup qualifier

=== Current ===
Since January 2017, Gould has been working as football coach and therapeutic mentor. In 2024, Gould successfully passed his FIFA football agent's exam at Wembley Stadium. He is also currently a recording music artist. In June 2020, Gould signed a three-year deal with Warner Music Group in the Philippines.
