= Nadzri Erwan =

Bruneian footballer

Personal information
- Full name: Muhammad Nadzri bin Haji Erwan
- Date of birth: 16 June 1995 (age 31)
- Place of birth: Bandar Seri Begawan, Brunei
- Height: 1.63 m (5 ft 4 in)
- Position: Midfielder

Team information
- Current team: Nelayan FT
- Number: 13

Youth career
- 2005: PIP
- MSSSBD

Senior career*
| Years | Team | Apps | (Gls) |
| 2009–2011 | Brunei Youth Team | | |
| 2015–2016 | Tabuan Muda | | (1) |
| 2023–2025 | Nelayan | | |

International career^{‡}
| 2013 | Brunei U19 | 8 | (0) |
| 2015 | Brunei U23 | 5 | (0) |
| 2015 | Brunei | 1 | (0) |
- * Club domestic league appearances and goals as of 22 January 2024 ‡ National team caps and goals as of 8 September 2017

Leading Hand Muhammad Nadzri bin Haji Erwan (born 16 June 1995) is a Bruneian footballer who plays as a midfielder for Nelayan FT of the Belait District League. He has played for various national youth teams in Brunei since 2009 and has one cap for the Brunei national football team.

== Club career ==
At the club level, Nadzri turned out for the league teams of the national youth setup, namely Brunei Youth Team (from 2009 to 2011) and Tabuan Muda (from 2015 to 2016). His contemporaries include Shafie Effendy, Khairil Shahme Suhaimi, Aman Abdul Rahim and Abdul Khair Basri.

== International career ==
Nadzri played for the Young Wasps starting from under-14 level all the way up to under-23 level. He participated in two editions of the Southeast Asian Games, namely the 2015 tournament in Singapore and also in 2017 that was hosted in Malaysia as a late replacement for Hanif Hamir.

Nadzri's first international cap came in a friendly match against Cambodia in a 1–6 loss, where he was a starter in the match.

== Personal life ==
Nadzri is currently employed by the Royal Brunei Navy.
