= Dominic del Rosario =

Filipino footballer

Personal information
- Full name: Dominic Liam del Rosario
- Date of birth: 14 November 1996 (age 29)
- Place of birth: Sydney, Australia
- Position: Midfielder

Youth career
- c. 2002–2010: Austral F.C.
- c.2011: Liverpool Olympic
- 2012: Southwest Wanderers F.C.
- John Edmondson High School
- 2012: World F.C.

Senior career*
Years	Team	Apps	(Gls)
?	Fairfield City Lions		
2013–2017	Kaya		
2015	→ JP Voltes (loan)		
2017	Ilocos United		
2017–2019	Global Cebu		
2019	Green Archers United		
2020	Global		

International career^{‡}
2014	Philippines U21		
2015	Philippines U23	1	(0)
2016–	Philippines	1	(0)
- * Club domestic league appearances and goals ‡ National team caps and goals as of 25 March 2016 (UTC)

Dominic Liam del Rosario (born 14 November 1996) is a footballer who currently plays for Green Archers United of the Philippines Football League. He has also played as part of the Philippines national football team debuting for the senior side against Uzbekistan in a 2018 FIFA World Cup qualifier match.

== Early life ==
Dominic Liam del Rosario was born in Sydney, Australia on 14 November 1996. and spent his childhood in Australia visiting the Philippines almost every year to spend time with relatives based in San Pedro, Laguna. He was born to a Filipino mother and Irish-French-Latvian father.

== Club career ==
=== Youth ===
Austral Football Club was the first club that del Rosario entered where he played for 8 years. He switched to Liverpool Olympic where he played for two years. He was coached by his best friend's father in both Austral and Liverpool. At age 14, he decided to pursue a football career. At age 15, del Rosario played for Southwest Wanderers F.C. for a year. He also became part of the varsity football team of the John Edmondson High School as a goalkeeper as a second year student.

He entered Sydney-based World Football Club, a football academy at age 15. He went two times to Europe with the academy. He had six games against teams. He received inquiries from six coaches after a match against Sheffield United in England, but only three of which extended invitation for a trial.

Del Rosario returned to Europe for a third time, without the academy. During his third trip to Europe he had trials with the Blackpool and Manchester City Shadow Squad with the latter being a trial team for the Manchester City Academy.

=== Senior ===
Del Rosario also played for the Fairfield Lions for one season before he signed with Kaya F.C. his first Philippine club in September 2013 after an invitation from then Kaya coach, David Perković. Months earlier during the Holy Week he had training sessions with Stallion F.C. He also received offer from Blackburn but he was leaving for England at that time shortly.

He had a brief stint with then Division-2 sides, JP Voltes F.C. in 2015. Playing for the club on a loan basis, del Rosario helped the club achieve promotion to Division 1 after winning a two-legged play-off of the 2015 United Football League season. However, in the 2016 season, Division 2 was merged into Division 1. Del Rosario returned to Kaya.

After a stint with Kaya, del Rosario joined newly formed side Ilocos United F.C. of the Philippines Football League, a league considered to be the successor of the UFL.

In August 2020, del Rosario joined NWSF Super League club Macquarie Dragons.

== International career ==
=== Philippines U21 ===
Del Rosario represented the Philippines at the youth level. He debuted for the Philippine U21 national team at the 2014 Hassanal Bolkiah Trophy where he also made his first assist.

=== Philippines U23 ===
Del Rosario was called up to the Philippines U23 national team for the 2015 Southeast Asian Games. He made his debut in a 1–5 defeat against Myanmar U23.

=== Philippines ===
He debuted for the senior side in a 2018 FIFA World Cup qualifier match against Uzbekistan on 25 March 2016 in Tashkent. He came in as a substitute at that match into 2 minutes of extra time in the second half for Luke Woodland.
