= Kim Chul-soo (footballer) =

South Korean footballer (born 1952)

Kim Chul-soo 김철수
Personal information
- Full name: Kim Chul-soo
- Date of birth: July 6, 1952
- Date of death: September 1, 2026 (aged 74)
- Place of death: South Korea
- Height: 1.76 m (5 ft 9 1/2 in)
- Position: Defender

Youth career
- Hanyang University (한양대학교)

Senior career*
Years	Team	Apps	(Gls)
?–1986	POSCO Atoms	47	(0)

International career
–	South Korea	9	(0)

Managerial career
- 2011–2013: Loyola Meralco Sparks
- –: Far Eastern University (men and women)
- 2014–2015: Manila Jeepney
- 2024: Loyola
- * Club domestic league appearances and goals

- Kim Chul-soo
- Hangul: 김철수
- Hanja: 金哲洙
- RR: Gim Cheolsu
- MR: Kim Ch'ŏlsu

Kim Chul-soo (Korean: 김철수; July 6, 1952 – September 1, 2026) was a South Korean football coach and former player.

== Early life and education ==
Kim Chul-soo was born on July 6, 1952. Kim graduated from the Incheon College of Physical Education and is listed as an alumnus of Hanyang University.

== Playing career ==
Kim Chul-soo played as a defender for POSCO Atoms. He played for POSCO in the K League from its inaugural season in 1983 until 1986. However, he had already represented POSCO in the National Semi-professional Football League, being named the league's best player in the 1981 Autumn League season.

Kim also played for Jeil Life Insurance. He represented the South Korea national team.

== Coaching career ==
=== In South Korea ===
Kim started his coaching career in Suwon Jidong Elementary School in 1983. He coached at various schools in South Korea. Among his students were Lee Young-pyo of Anyang Elementary School and Park Ji-sung of Seryu Elementary School. He became disillusioned with coaching in the school football system due to pressure from parents and school administrators.

In 2000, Kim opened a restaurant in Hongcheon County, Gangwon. He organized a football team made of orphan youth from the vicitnity.

=== In the Philippines ===
Kim first went to the Philippines in 2006, where he organized a team for Kopil, or Kopino children, including youth who had been abandoned by their Korean fathers.

=== Far Eastern University ===
The Far Eastern University (FEU) also made him technical director of their football program. The school takes part in the University Athletic Association of the Philippines (UAAP) Kim coached the FEU Tamaraws football team in UAAP Season 76 and 77 (2013–2014 and 2014–2015).

He was also coach of the FEU Lady Tamaraws, the school's women's team. Kim was briefly banned for a few games from the UAAP after he and three of his players attacked a referee after a lost in 2010. He however, help the team win the Season 73 women's football title in 2011.

=== United Football League ===
Kim coached the Loyola Meralco Sparks in the United Football League (UFL). The team took part at the 2012 Singapore Cup. Vince Santos succeeded Kim ahead of the 2013 UFL season. Kim later briefly coached the Manila Jeepney.

== Death ==
Kim died in South Korea in September 1, 2026.

== Honours ==
=== As a player ===
Individual

- K League Best XI: 1983, 1985
- National Semi-professional Football League Autumn League Best Player: 1981

=== As coach ===
Far Eastern University (men)

- UAAP football champions: Seasons 76 (2013–2014), 77 (2014–2015)

Far Eastern University (women)

- UAAP football champions: Seasons 73 (2010–2011)
