= Manila Jeepney F.C. =

Manila Jeepney
- Full name: Manila Jeepney Football Club
- Nickname: Los Manileños
- Founded: 2013; 13 years ago
- League: UFL Division 1
Home colours	Away colours

Manila Jeepney Football Club was a professional Filipino football club, based in the city of Manila, Philippines. The team competed in the United Football League, the highest level of club football in the Philippines.

The team entered the United Football League as a guest team in the 2013 United Football League Cup, before being admitted as an official club of the UFL Division 2 in 2014. In their first season in the second division of the United Football League, the team won promotion to the first division. However, after participating at the 2015 season it withdrew from the league. It is acknowledged as the official football club of the city of Manila.

== Etymology ==
The name of the football club is derived from the jeepney, a popular mode of transport in the Philippines.

== History ==
Manila Jeepney FC was established in June 2013 with the vision of being the official city team of the City of Manila. The club was founded by young business executives and passionate football fans led by Javier Mantecon, Alfonso Javier and Antonio Longa.

A first squad was formed under the auspices of former Kaya FC coach, Kale Alvarez. The club made its debut at the United Football League in 2013 participating at the 2013 UFL Cup where it reached the knockout stages. Manila Jeepney later entered the league proper in 2014, and entered Division 2 of the league. It finished second in the UFL-2 2014 season and earned a promotion to UFL Division 1.

== Sponsorships ==
In late September 2013, the Club secured support from the ICTSI Foundation Inc., and CORD Chemicals Inc. as the primary partners.

In October 2013, the City of Manila officially acknowledged the club as the official city team of Manila with complete backing from the Mayor, the Honorable Joseph Ejercito (Erap) Estrada and Vice Mayor, Francisco (Isko) Moreno.

== Football development program ==
Manila Jeepney was established to support the development of football in the city of Manila. The club partnered with Leveriza F.C., which is a grassroots team composing of youths from the slums in Manila.

Simultaneously with its participation in league competitions, the club undertook its one-of-a-kind football advocacy program aimed at enhancing lives of Manila's street children population through football with Project LIPAD. The project aspires to have an intake of approximately 100 children in the initial stages with plans to expand further to cover more.

== Kit manufacturers and shirt sponsors ==
Period	Kit manufacturer	Shirt partner
2013–2015	LGR Athletic Wears	Cord Epoxy

== Coaches ==
Coaches by Years (2013–2015)

Name	Nat	Period	Honours
Michael Angelo Alvarez	(Philippines)	2013–2014	UFL Division 2 Runners-up
Kim Chul-Soo	(South Korea)	2014–2015	

== Honors ==
=== Domestic competitions ===
- United Football League Division 2

- Runners-up : 2014

== Records ==
Season	Division	Tms.	Pos.	PFF Men's	UFL Cup	UFL FA LC	UFL FA Cup
2013–14	2	12	2nd	—	Round of 16		—
2014–15	1	10	7th	—	Quarter-finals	Group stage	

Key

- Tms. = Number of teams
- Pos. = Position in league
- TBD = To be determined
- DNQ = Did not qualify
