= List of foreign Philippines Football League players =

This is a list of foreign players in the Philippines Football League. The following players are considered foreign if they do not hold a Philippine passport. If a player is naturalized through various means, then he is no longer considered a foreign player.

Up to now, 33 different nations have been represented in the Philippines Football League.

== Current foreign players ==
PFL clubs can register a maximum of six foreign players with at least one player of AFC affiliated nationality, but may only register four per matchday.

As of 19 August 2023

=== Foreign players ===
Club	Player 1	Player 2	Player 3	Player 4	Player 5	Player 6
Dynamic Herb Cebu	(Japan) Rintaro Hama	(Japan) Ken Murayama	(Japan) Ryo Togashi	(Turkey) Arda Çınkır	(Turkey) Göktuğ Demiroğlu	(Ivory Coast) Marius Kore
Kaya–Iloilo	(Japan) Daizo Horikoshi	(Japan) Akito Saito	(Cameroon) Henri Bandeken	(Senegal) Robert Lopez Mendy	(Argentina) Ricardo Sendra	(Senegal) Abou Sy
Maharlika Manila	(Morocco) Soufiane Bouazzaoui	(The Gambia) Ousman Jeng	(United States) Tyler John	(Cameroon) Boris Moundang	(Senegal) Ibrahima Ndour	
Mendiola 1991	(Iran) Milad Behgandom	(Lebanon) Ali Ghamloush	(Iran) Hamed Hajimehdi	(Cameroon) Junior Sam		
Stallion Laguna	(Japan) Reo Nakamura	(Japan) Yuta Nomura	(United States) Kraig Bonanken	(Argentina) Ignacio Giampaoli	(Argentina) Cristian Ivanobski	(United States) Abraham Placito

== Asia (AFC) ==
As of 27th May 2022

Country	Player	Club	Season
Australia
Australia	Andrew Pawiak	Ilocos United	2017
Australia	Blake Powell	Ceres–Negros	2018
Australia	Harry Sawyer	Davao Aguilas	2017, 2018
Australia	Jesse Curran	Kaya–Iloilo	2022–23
Australia	Tahj Minniecon	Meralco Manila	2017
Australia	Tahj Minniecon	Davao Aguilas	2018
Australia	Yianni Perkatis	Global Cebu	2017
Iran
Iran	Hamed Hajimehdi	Mendiola 1991	2019, 2020, 2021, 2022–23, 2023–24
Iran	Hamed Hajimehdi	Stallion Laguna	2022–23
Iran	Milad Behgandom	Mendiola 1991	2020, 2023–24
Iran	Milad Behgandom	Kaya–Iloilo	2022–23
Iran	Mahdi Keygobadhi	Mendiola 1991	2022–23
Iran	Amir Memari	Stallion Laguna	2022–23
Iran	Mahan Rahmani	Mendiola 1991	2022–23
Iraq	Ahamad Azzawi	Global Cebu	2017
Japan	Atsushi Shimono	JPV Marikina	2017, 2018
Japan	Daizo Horikoshi	Kaya–Iloilo	2020, 2021, 2022–23, 2023–24
Japan	Tamon Horikoshi	Kaya–Iloilo	2022–23
Japan	Keigo Moriyasu	JPV Marikina	2018
Japan	Ken Kensei	Stallion Laguna	2018
Japan	Rintaro Hama	Dynamic	2022–23, 2023–24
Japan	Kota Kawase	Ceres–Negros	2017
Japan	Masaki Yanagawa	JPV Marikina	2017
Japan	Masanari Omura	Kaya–Iloilo	2017, 2018, 2019, 2020, 2021
Japan	Dylan Nobiraki	Kaya–Iloilo	2022–23
Japan	Ren Okuda	Dynamic Herb Cebu	2022–23, 2023–24
Japan	Ryo Fujii	Kaya–Iloilo	2021, 2022–23
Japan	Ryo Tamiya	Stallion Laguna	2017
Japan	Ryota Ishikawa	Stallion Laguna	2017
Japan	Ryuki Kozawa	JPV Marikina	2018
Japan	Shu Sasaki	Global Cebu	2017
Japan	Takashi Odawara	JPV Marikina	2017
Japan	Takashi Odawara	Davao Aguilas	2018
Japan	Takashi Odawara	Ceres–Negros	2019
Japan	Takashi Odawara	United City	2020
Japan	Takumi Uesato	JPV Marikina	2017, 2018
Japan	Takumi Uesato	Ceres–Negros	2018
Japan	Takumi Uesato	Kaya–Iloilo	2020
Japan	Tsubasa Suzuki	JPV Marikina	2018
Japan	Yu Hoshide	Global Cebu	2017
Japan	Yusuke Yamagata	Stallion Laguna	2017
Japan	Yusuke Hayashi	Stallion Laguna	2022–23
Japan	Kosuke Uchida	Stallion Laguna	2022–23
Japan	Ken Murayama	Dynamic Herb Cebu	2023–24
Japan	Ryo Togashi	Dynamic Herb Cebu	2023–24
Japan	Akito Saito	Kaya–Iloilo	2023–24
Japan	Reo Nakamura	Stallion Laguna	2023–24
Japan	Yuta Nomura	Stallion Laguna	2023–24
Lebanon	Ali Ghamloush	Mendiola 1991	2022–23, 2023–24
South Korea	Jung Da-hwon	United City	2021
South Korea	Kim Dong-Hyeon	Stallion Laguna	2019
South Korea	Kim Dongyeon	Stallion Laguna	2020
South Korea	Kim Hyun-Kyoon	Green Archers United	2019
South Korea	Kim Minsu	Mendiola 1991	2021, 2022–23
South Korea	Kim Myung-Su	Stallion Laguna	2017
South Korea	Kim Sung-min	Davao Aguilas	2018,
South Korea	Kim Sung-min	Stallion Laguna	2021
South Korea	Kim Sung-min	Maharlika Manila	2020, 2022–23
South Korea	Ko Kyung-joon	Stallion Laguna	2017, 2018
South Korea	Lee Jeong-min	Meralco Manila	2017
South Korea	Lee Jeong-min	Global Cebu	2018
South Korea	Park Jeong-chol	Stallion Laguna	2019
South Korea	Yu Seungpyo	Stallion Laguna	2019
South Korea	Yu Sung-Na	Stallion Laguna	2018
Tajikistan	Amirbek Juraboev	United City	2022–23
Yemen	Gamal Al Mesbahi	Dynamic Herb Cebu	2021

== Africa (CAF) ==
As of 19 June 2022

Country	Player	Club	Season
Cameroon	Boris Moundang	Philippine Air Force	2019
Cameroon	Boris Moundang	Maharlika Manila	2022–23, 2023–24
Cameroon	Christian Nana	Stallion Laguna	2017, 2019
Cameroon	Frank Baring	Maharlika Manila	2022–23
Cameroon	Freddy Mbang	Green Archers United	2019
Cameroon	Henri Bandeken	Green Archers United	2019
Cameroon	Henri Bandeken	Maharlika Manila	2020, 2022–23
Cameroon	Henri Bandeken	Mendiola 1991	2022–23
Cameroon	Henri Bandeken	Kaya–Iloilo	2023–24
Cameroon	Joel Okono	Green Archers United	2019
Cameroon	Joel Okono	Philippine Air Force	2019
Cameroon	Junior Ngong Sam	United City	2022–23
Cameroon	Junior Ngong Sam	Mendiola 1991	2022–23, 2023–24
Cameroon	Serge Kaole	Global Cebu	2017
Cameroon	Serge Kaole	Kaya–Iloilo	2018
Cameroon	Serge Kaole	Maharlika Manila	2020
Cameroon	Serge Kaole	Mendiola 1991	2022–23
Cameroon	Souleyman Ndepe	Mendiola 1991	2019, 2020
Cameroon	William Ebanda	Ilocos United	2017
(Democratic Republic of the Congo); DR Congo	Gary Epesso	Maharlika Manila	2020, 2022–23
Equatorial Guinea	Ben Konaté	Maharlika Manila	2022–23
(The Gambia); Gambia	Ousman Jeng	Maharlika Manila	2022–23, 2023–24
Ghana	Alfred Osei	Kaya–Iloilo	2017, 2018, 2019
Ghana	Baba Sampana	Ilocos United	2017
Ghana	Isaac Essel	Maharlika Manila	2022–23
Ghana	Daniel Ashley	Mendiola 1991	2021
Ghana	David Asare	Maharlika Manila	2022–23
Ghana	Emmanuel Osei	Kaya–Iloilo	2020
Ghana	Patrick Arthur	Kaya–Iloilo	2022–23
Ghana	Patrick Asare	Kaya–Iloilo	2021
Ghana	Samuel Bonney	Stallion Laguna	2020
Ghana	Stephen Appiah	Green Archers United	2019
Ghana	Stephen Appiah	Mendiola 1991	2020, 2022–23
Ghana	Valentine Kama	Ilocos United	2017
Guinea	Mohamed Soumah	Dynamic Herb Cebu	2021, 2022–23
Guinea	Sekou Sylla	Global Cebu	2017
Ivory Coast	Arthur Kouassi	Ilocos United	2017
Ivory Coast	Dini Ouattara	Mendiola 1991	2019, 2020
Ivory Coast	Hosni Dosso	Mendiola 1991	2021
Ivory Coast	Marius Kore	Dynamic Herb Cebu	2021, 2022–23, 2023–24
Ivory Coast	Roland Sadia	Stallion Laguna	2017
Morocco	Soufiane Bouazzaoui	Maharlika Manila	2023–24
Nigeria	Anthony Okoh	Global Makati	2019
Nigeria	Ekundayo Andrew	Dynamic Herb Cebu	2021
Nigeria	Emmanuel Otuyemi	Global Makati	2019
Nigeria	Emmanuel Otuyemi	Maharlika Manila	2022–23
Nigeria	Ilemona Usman	Dynamic Herb Cebu	2021
Nigeria	Kenneth Obananaya	Global Makati	2019
Senegal	Abou Sy	Stallion Laguna	2018, 2019, 2020, 2021, 2022–23
Senegal	Abou Sy	Kaya–Iloilo	2023–24
Senegal	Alassane Wade	Mendiola 1991	2022–23
Senegal	Ibrahima Ndour	Stallion Laguna	2020
Senegal	Ibrahima Ndour	Maharlika Manila	2022–23, 2023–24
Senegal	Robert Lopez Mendy	Kaya–Iloilo	2017, 2018, 2022–23, 2023–24
Senegal	Robert Lopez Mendy	Ceres–Negros	2019
Senegal	Robert Lopez Mendy	United City	2020
South Africa	Alan Robertson	United City	2022–23
Togo	Ibrahim Moro	Dynamic Herb Cebu	2022–23

== Europe (UEFA) ==
As of 28 May 2022

Country	Player	Club	Season
Bosnia and Herzegovina	Mahir Karic	Ceres–Negros	2019
England	Adam Mitter	Ilocos United	2017
England	Adam Mitter	Global Cebu	2018
Norway	Simen Lyngbø	Azkals Development Team	2020
Norway	Simen Lyngbø	United City	2022–23
Serbia	Bojan Mališić	Davao Aguilas	2017
Serbia	Marko Trkulja	Davao Aguilas	2017
Serbia	Milan Nikolić	Meralco Manila	2017
Serbia	Milan Nikolić	Global Cebu	2018
Serbia	Miloš Krstić	Davao Aguilas	2017
Serbia	Nikola Grubješić	Davao Aguilas	2017
Spain	Antonio Bello	Ceres–Negros	2017
Spain	Bienvenido Marañón	Ceres–Negros	2017, 2018, 2019
Spain	Bienvenido Marañón	United City	2020
Spain	Bienvenido Villaflor	Maharlika Manila	2022–23
Spain	Fernando Rodríguez	Ceres–Negros	2017
Spain	Joaco Cañas	Meralco Manila	2017
Spain	Joaco Cañas	Dynamic Herb Cebu	2021, 2022–23
Spain	Rufo Sánchez	Global Cebu	2017, 2018
Spain	Súper	Ceres–Negros	2017, 2018, 2019, 2020
Spain	Toni Doblas	Ceres–Negros	2018
Sweden	Andoni Suescun	Stallion Laguna	2019
Switzerland	Carlo Polli	Stallion Laguna	2017, 2018
Switzerland	Gabriele Mascazzini	Stallion Laguna	2017
Turkey	Arda Çınkır	Dynamic Herb Cebu	2022–23, 2023–24
Turkey	Mert Altınöz	Dynamic Herb Cebu	2022–23
Turkey	Nazım Özcan	Dynamic Herb Cebu	2022–23

== North and Central America, Caribbean (CONCACAF) ==
As of 28 May 2022

Country	Player	Club	Season
Canada	Edris Najm	Stallion Laguna	2019
Canada	Matt Silva	United City	2022–23
Canada	Leaford Allen	Dynamic Herb Cebu	2022–23
Curaçao	Kemy Agustien	Global Cebu	2017
Mexico	Juan Trujillo	Stallion Laguna	2021, 2022–23, 2023–24
Trinidad and Tobago	Carlyle Mitchell	Kaya–Iloilo	2020, 2021, 2022–23
Trinidad and Tobago	Darren Mitchell	Davao Aguilas	2017
Trinidad and Tobago	Darryl Roberts	Global Cebu	2017, 2018
Trinidad and Tobago	Darryl Roberts	Kaya–Iloilo	2019
Trinidad and Tobago	Darryl Roberts	Azkals Development Team	2020
United States	Abraham Placito	Stallion Laguna	2021, 2022–23, 2023–24
United States	Jonny Campbell	United City	2021
United States	Tyler John	Maharlika Manila	2023–24
United States	Hunter Harrison	Meralco Manila	2017
United States	Oscar Delgado	Stallion Laguna	2022–23
United States	Rafael Nogueda	Stallion Laguna	2022–23
United States	Kraig Bonanken	Stallion Laguna	2022–23, 2023–24

== Oceania (OFC) ==
As of 28 May 2022

Country	Player	Club	Season
New Zealand	Jai Ingham	United City	2021
Papua New Guinea	Brad McDonald	Davao Aguilas	2017, 2018

== South America (CONMEBOL) ==
As of 28 May 2022

Country	Player	Club	Season
Argentina	Ricardo Sendra	Mendiola 1991	2019
Argentina	Ricardo Sendra	Stallion Laguna	2020
Argentina	Ricardo Sendra	Dynamic Herb Cebu	2021
Argentina	Ricardo Sendra	United City	2022–23
Argentina	Ricardo Sendra	Kaya–Iloilo	2023–24
Argentina	Cristian Ivanobski	Stallion Laguna	2023–24
Argentina	Ignacio Giampaoli	Stallion Laguna	2023–24
Brazil	Daniel Matsunaga	Maharlika Manila	2020
Brazil	Diego Alves	Davao Aguilas	2018
Brazil	Gabriel Silva	Stallion Laguna	2021, 2022–23
Brazil	Leonardo Nogueira	Stallion Laguna	2022–23
Brazil	Rafael Dumas	Global Cebu	2017
Brazil	Wesley dos Santos	Global Cebu	2017, 2018
Brazil	Wesley dos Santos	Davao Aguilas	2018
