= 2022 Copa Paulino Alcantara final =

- Event: 2022 Copa Paulino Alcantara
Kaya–Iloilo	United City
2	3
- Date: May 22, 2022
- Venue: PFF National Training Center, Carmona
- Man of the Match: Anthony Pinthus (United City)
- Referee: Clifford Daypuyat

The final of the fourth season of the Copa Paulino Alcantara was contested by Kaya–Iloilo and United City on neutral ground at the PFF National Training Center in Carmona, Cavite.

== Background ==
Unlike the previous editions of the Copa Paulino Alcantara, all seven teams of the Philippines Football League were drawn into one large group stage dubbed as the "Elimination round", where each team played the other teams once. Kaya came into the competition as the defending cup champions, having won the 2021 cup tournament against the Azkals Development Team, while this was United City's first Copa under current management after MMC Sportz took control of the club following the financial problems of the previous owner, Leo Rey Yanson. United City (in the form of Ceres-Negros), last won the 2019 final against Kaya.

Kaya and United City met in the elimination round on March 28, with United City taking the lead through captain Mike Ott. Kaya equalized in the second half through Japanese winger Daizo Horikoshi, with the match eventually ending 1–1. Horikoshi would end up with the most goals in the elimination round, scoring 5 in 6 matches as Kaya went through the round unbeaten, snatching top spot with a 3–0 over second-placed Dynamic Herb Cebu on the last matchday. United City likewise got through the round unbeaten, but finished in third due to draws with Dynamic Herb Cebu, Mendiola 1991, and a draw on the last matchday against Stallion Laguna that saw the latter qualify for the semifinals.

In the semifinals, Kaya were without the services of Carlyle Mitchell after the defender got into an argument with Stallion defender Kameron Bolden over refereeing in Kaya's 3–2 over Stallion. The tournament's leading scorer Daizo Horikoshi scored the eventual winner in the last 10 minutes after close attempts from both sides. United City faced Dynamic Herb Cebu, who were without the services of Turkish defender Nazim Özcan, who was suspended on the last matchday of the elimination round. Simen Lyngbø likewise scored the only goal in the game after Ace Villanueva's missed clearance.

== Route to the final ==
Kaya–Iloilo		Round	United City	
Opponent	Result	Group stage	Opponent	Result
Maharlika Manila	1–0	Matchday 1	Maharlika Manila	4–0
United City	1–1	Matchday 2	Kaya–Iloilo	1–1
Mendiola 1991	1–0	Matchday 3	Azkals Development Team	4–0
Azkals Development Team	4–0	Matchday 4	Mendiola 1991	0–0
Stallion Laguna	3–2	Matchday 5	Dynamic Herb Cebu	1–1
Dynamic Herb Cebu	3–0	Matchday 6	Stallion Laguna	0–0
Elimination round winners: Pos / Team / Pld / Pts; 1 / Kaya–Iloilo / 6 / 16; 2 / Dynamic Herb Cebu / 6 / 13; 3 / United City / 6 / 10; 4 / Azkals Development Team / 6 / 7; 5 / Stallion Laguna / 6 / 4; 6 / Maharlika Manila / 6 / 4; 7 / Mendiola 1991 / 6 / 2; Source: PFL (via Facebook)		Final standings	Elimination round third place: Pos / Team / Pld / Pts; 1 / Kaya–Iloilo / 6 / 16; 2 / Dynamic Herb Cebu / 6 / 13; 3 / United City / 6 / 10; 4 / Azkals Development Team / 6 / 7; 5 / Stallion Laguna / 6 / 4; 6 / Maharlika Manila / 6 / 4; 7 / Mendiola 1991 / 6 / 2; Source: PFL (via Facebook)	
Opponent	Result	Knockout phase	Opponent	Result
Stallion Laguna	1–0	Semi-finals	Dynamic Herb Cebu	1–0

== Match summary ==
External videos
- 2022 Copa Paulino Alcantara Final
- Copa Paulino Alcantara 2022 - Final - Kaya FC-Iloilo vs. United City FC by the Philippines Football League

The final of the 2022 Copa Paulino Alcantara was held on May 22, 2022 in the PFF National Training Center in Carmona, Cavite. While the previous edition's final was held in a bubble format with no spectators allowed to watch, this year's final saw a nearly packed out crowd due to the easing of COVID-19 cases in the Philippines. Kaya fielded a full-strength lineup, but were without the services of Japanese midfielder Ryo Fujii due to the league only allowing four foreigners during one match. Jovin Bedic, Sandro Reyes, and Oskari Kekkonen also recently returned from national team duty in the 2021 Southeast Asian Games, but Kekkonen played the entire match while Bedic was subbed on. United City fielded an almost full-strength lineup, although Tajikistani midfielder Amirbek Juraboev was recovering from an injury, as well as called up to the national team for the AFC Asian Cup qualification matches. Kaya last won the tournament in 2021 over the Azkals Development Team, while United City's predecessors, Ceres–Negros, won the Copa in 2019, versus Kaya, after fielding only 12 outfield players.

After only 11 minutes, the match saw the first goal, with Curt Dizon's lofted ball falling just outside the box, where Kenshiro Daniels, who scored for Kaya in the 2021 final, scored after confusion between Zach Banzon and Carlyle Mitchell, becoming the only player to score in three successive Copa finals, scoring a consolation in the 2019 final and the winner in the 2021 final. However, only 3 minutes later, a defensive error from Alan Robertson saw Senegalese forward Robert Lopez Mendy steal into the box and score an equalizer. Kaya proceeded to dominate the match, with Kaya midfielder Jesus Melliza eventually scoring his third goal of the campaign from outside the box. Kaya went into the half 2–1 up, but United City were growing into the match. In the second half, Hikaru Minegishi, who last played for Global Cebu in the finals series, scored with a perfectly timed volley that launched the ball into the top corner. United City became more aggressive and found the winner, as Mark Hartmann's low corner was volleyed home by captain Mike Ott. Kaya pushed for a late equalizer, but Anthony Pinthus came up with several fine saves to bring United City their first ever Copa Paulino Alcantara title.

The match ended with United City 3–2 victors over Kaya, in the highest-scoring Copa final to date. In doing so, they qualified for the group stages of the 2023–24 AFC Cup, although they still might qualify for the 2023–24 AFC Champions League through the 2022 Philippines Football League, which starts in June 2022. The final also saw another record as Audie Menzi and Jovin Bedic became the first players to appear in four Copa finals, having first appeared in the inaugural final in 2018.

Anthony Pinthus' fine performance saw him win Player of the match, with two individual awards going United City's way, with Pinthus also winning the Golden Glove and Mike Ott winning Golden Ball. Kaya's Daizo Horikoshi won Golden Boot by scoring six goals in the tournament, 2 more than Dynamic Herb Cebu's Arda Çınkır.

May 22, 2022
20:30 UTC+8

Kaya–Iloilo	2–3	United City
Lopez Mendy 14'; Melliza 32'		Daniels 11'; Minegishi 52'; Ott 69'

PFF National Training Center, Carmona
Referee: Clifford Daypuyat

Kaya–Iloilo	United City

GK	1	(Philippines) Zach Banzon
	12	(Philippines) Mar Diano	(substituted off) 73'
	19	(Trinidad and Tobago) Carlyle Mitchell
	23	(Philippines) Simone Rota (c)
	44	(Philippines) Audie Menzi
	6	(Philippines) Oskari Kekkonen
	13	(Philippines) Jesus Melliza	(substituted off) 79'
	4	(Senegal) Patrick Arthur
	8	(Philippines) Jesse Curran
	17	(Senegal) Robert Lopez Mendy
	20	(Japan) Daizo Horikoshi
Substitutes:
GK	2	(Philippines) Kenry Balobo
	7	(Philippines) Jovin Bedic	(substituted in) 79'
	9	(Philippines) Eric Giganto
	10	(Philippines) Arnel Amita
	18	(Philippines) Jarvey Gayoso	(substituted in) 73'
	22	(Philippines) Fitch Arboleda
	27	(Philippines) Shirmar Felongco
Head Coach:
(Japan) Yu Hoshide

GK	1	(Philippines) Anthony Pinthus
	99	(Philippines) Pete Forrosuelo
	44	(Philippines) Mathew Custodio
	23	(South Africa) Alan Robertson
	2	(Norway) Simen Lyngbø
	19	(Philippines) Curt Dizon	(substituted off) 81'
	20	(Philippines) Mark Hartmann
	30	(Argentina) Ricardo Sendra
	14	(Philippines) Hikaru Minegishi	(substituted off) 90+2'
	9	(Philippines) Mike Ott (c)
	11	(Philippines) Kenshiro Daniels
Substitutes:
GK	28	(Canada) Matt Silva
	3	(Philippines) Dean Ebarle
	7	(Philippines) Paolo Salenga
	9	(Philippines) Kieran Hayes	(substituted in) 81'
	10	(Philippines) Andreas Esswein
	17	(Philippines) Ivan Ouano	(substituted in) 90+2'
	88	(Philippines) William Grierson
Head Coach:
(England) Jason Withe
