= 2022 Kaya F.C.–Iloilo season =

Kaya–Iloilo
2022 season
- Owner: Santi Araneta
- Head Coach: Yu Hoshide
- Stadium: Iloilo Sports Complex
- Philippines Football League: TBD
- Copa Paulino Alcantara: Runners-up
- AFC Champions League: Preliminary round
- AFC Cup: Group stage
- Top goalscorer: League: Daizo Horikoshi (7); All: Daizo Horikoshi (13)
- Biggest win: 7-0 (Oct 16 v Mendiola 1991, PFL Matchday 9)
- Biggest defeat: 0–5 (Mar 8 v Sydney, Preliminary Round 1))
Home colours
- All statistics correct as of November 12, 2022.

The 2022 season is Kaya F.C.–Iloilo's 5th season in the Philippines Football League and 4th in the Copa Paulino Alcantara. Kaya will also compete in the AFC Champions League qualifying Preliminary round and the AFC Cup.

The season saw a lot of changes in the lineup of the club. Masanari Omura, who had been with the club since 2011, decided to retire, as well as keeper Louie Casas. Foreign player Patrick Asare departed the club, with local players Dylan de Bruycker and Marwin Angeles moving to Nakhon Ratchasima and Persik Kediri, respectively. Kenshiro Daniels left the club to be closer to his family in the United States, eventually joining rivals United City F.C. in March. Kaya also made a number of signings, including Philippines national football team prospect Jesse Curran, Oskari Kekkonen, Mar Diano, and Sandro Reyes from the Azkals Development Team, as well as the ADT's Jarvey Gayoso, who had previously played for the club on loan in the 2021 AFC Champions League. 2018 Philippines Football League top scorer and Senegalese forward Robert Lopez Mendy also rejoined the club from Svay Rieng in Cambodia.

== Players ==
=== Squad information ===
As of August 9, 2022

No.	Pos.	Nat.	Name	Notes
1	GK	(Philippines)	Zach Banzon	
2	GK	(Philippines)	Kenry Balobo	
4	MF	(Ghana)	Patrick Arthur	
5	DF	(Philippines)	Camelo Tacusalme	
6	MF	(Philippines)	Oskari Kekkonen	Second nationality: (Finland)
7	FW	(Philippines)	Jovin Bedic	Captain
8	MF	(Philippines)	Marwin Angeles	
9	FW	(Philippines)	Eric Giganto	
10	MF	(Philippines)	Arnel Amita	
12	DF	(Philippines)	Mar Diano	
13	MF	(Philippines)	Jesus Melliza	
14	MF	(Japan)	Ryo Fujii	
15	DF	(Philippines)	Marco Casambre	
16	GK	(Philippines)	Quincy Kammeraad	
17	FW	(Senegal)	Robert Lopez Mendy	Vice-captain
18	FW	(Philippines)	Jarvey Gayoso	
19	DF	(Trinidad and Tobago)	Carlyle Mitchell	
20	MF	(Japan)	Daizo Horikoshi	
21	MF	(Philippines)	Sandro Reyes	
22	MF	(Philippines)	Fitch Arboleda	
23	DF	(Philippines)	Simone Rota	Second nationality: (Italy)
27	DF	(Philippines)	Shirmar Felongco	
31	GK	(Philippines)	Nathan Bata	Academy player
44	DF	(Philippines)	Audie Menzi	

== Transfers ==
Note: Flags indicate national team as defined under FIFA eligibility rules. Players may hold more than one non-FIFA nationality.

=== In ===
Date	Pos.	Nat.	Name	Age	From	Type	Ref.
Pre-season
January 23, 2022	DF	(Philippines)	Mar Diano	24	(Philippines) Azkals Development Team	Free transfer	
January 25, 2022	MF	(Philippines)	Oskari Kekkonen	22	(Philippines) Azkals Development Team	Free transfer	
January 27, 2022	FW	(Senegal)	Robert Lopez Mendy	34	(Cambodia) Svay Rieng	Free transfer	
January 29, 2022	MF	(Philippines)	Sandro Reyes	18	(Philippines) Azkals Development Team	Free transfer	
February 8, 2022	FW	(Philippines)	Jarvey Gayoso	24	(Philippines) Azkals Development Team	Free transfer	
February 20, 2022	MF	(Philippines)	Jesse Curran	25	(Thailand) Muangthong United	Free transfer	
March 20, 2022	GK	(Philippines)	Kenry Balobo	23	(Philippines) United City	Free transfer	
April 13, 2022	MF	(Ghana)	Patrick Arthur	25	Free Agent	Free transfer	
July 28, 2022	DF	(Philippines)	Marco Casambre	23	(Thailand) Sukhothai	Return from loan	
July 29, 2022	MF	(Philippines)	Marwin Angeles	31	(Indonesia) Persik Kediri	Free transfer	

=== Out ===
Date	Pos.	Nat.	Name	Age	To	Type	Ref.
Pre-season
November 30, 2021	MF	(Philippines)	Dylan de Bruycker	23	(Thailand) Nakhon Ratchasima	Free transfer	
January 13, 2022	MF	(Philippines)	Marwin Angeles	31	(Indonesia) Persik Kediri	Free transfer	
January 24, 2022	GK	(Philippines)	Louie Casas	35	Retired		
January 31, 2022	DF	(Japan)	Masanari Omura	37	Retired		
February 14, 2022	FW	(Ghana)	Patrick Asare	27	Unattached	Free transfer	
February 28, 2022	FW	(Philippines)	Kenshiro Daniels	27	(Philippines) United City	Free transfer	
July 4, 2022	MF	(Philippines)	Jesse Curran	26	(Thailand) BG Pathum	Free transfer	

== Kits ==
Supplier: (Philippines) LGR / Sponsor: LBC

Home

Goalkeeper 1

== Preseason and friendlies ==
Win Draw Loss

=== Friendlies ===
February 12, 2022 Friendly	Stallion Laguna	unknown	Kaya–Iloilo	Biñan
			Lopez Mendy ?'	Stadium: Biñan Football Stadium

== Competitions ==
=== Overview ===
Competition	First match	Last match	Starting round	Final position	Record							
Competition	First match	Last match	Starting round	Final position	Pld	W	D	L	GF	GA	GD	Win %
Philippines Football League	August 7, 2022	TBD	Matchday 1	TBD	12	10	0	2	35	10	+25	83.33
Copa Paulino Alcantara	March 14, 2022	May 22, 2022	Elimination round	Final	8	6	1	1	16	6	+10	75.00
AFC Cup	June 24, 2022	June 30, 2022	Group stage	Group stage	3	0	0	3	2	7	−5	0.00
AFC Champions League	March 8, 2022	March 8, 2022	Preliminary Round 1	Preliminary Round 1	1	0	0	1	0	5	−5	0.00
Total					24	16	1	7	53	28	+25	66.67

Last updated: March 13, 2020
Source: Competitions

=== Philippines Football League ===
Pos	Team	Pld	W	D	L	GF	GA	GD	Pts	Qualification or relegation
1	Kaya–Iloilo (C)	22	18	1	3	70	20	+50	55	Qualification for the 2023–24 AFC Champions League
2	Dynamic Herb Cebu	22	15	6	1	52	23	+29	51	Qualification for the 2023–24 AFC Cup
3	Stallion Laguna	22	11	2	9	39	26	+13	35	Qualification for the 2023–24 AFC Cup
—	United City	12	7	3	2	27	13	+14	24	Withdrew
—	Azkals Development Team (Note: The Azkals Development Team were a guest team for the PFL and ineligible to qualify for AFC club competitions.)	22	6	3	13	26	39	−13	21	Withdrew
4	Mendiola 1991	22	5	0	17	19	66	−47	15	
5	Maharlika Manila	22	2	1	19	14	60	−46	7	

Source: PFL
Rules for classification: 1) Points; 2) Goal Difference; 3) Goals scored
(C) Champions
Notes:

August 7, 2022 1	Kaya–Iloilo	1-0	Azkals Development Team	Manila
17:00 UTC+8	Giganto 90+1'	Report		Stadium: Rizal Memorial Stadium

August 14, 2022 2	Kaya–Iloilo	3-0	Dynamic Herb Cebu	Manila
19:00 UTC+8	Gayoso 55'; Horikoshi 86', 90+2'	Report		Stadium: Rizal Memorial Stadium

August 20, 2022 3	Kaya–Iloilo	6-1	Mendiola 1991	Manila
17:30 UTC+8	Bedic 40', 75'; Giganto 45+2'; Gayoso 56'; Horikoshi 89'; Melliza 90+2'	Report	Altiche 21'	Stadium: Rizal Memorial Stadium

August 27, 2022 4	Kaya–Iloilo	4-1	Maharlika Manila	Manila
15:00 UTC+8	Gayoso 13', 79', 81'; Mitchell 41'	Report	Clarino 90+4'	Stadium: Rizal Memorial Stadium

September 3, 2022 5	Kaya–Iloilo	3-0	Stallion Laguna	Manila
19:00 UTC+8	Gayoso 38'; Bedic 41'; Horikoshi 64'			Stadium: Rizal Memorial Stadium

September 17, 2022 6	United City	2-0	Kaya–Iloilo	Cavite
16:00 UTC+8	Bugas 57'; Minegishi 87'	Report		Stadium: PFF National Training Center

October 1, 2022 7	Azkals Development Team	0-1	Kaya–Iloilo	Manila
16:00 UTC+8		Report	Lopez Mendy 28'	Stadium: Rizal Memorial Stadium

October 9, 2022 8	Dynamic Herb Cebu	3-2	Kaya–Iloilo	Cebu
15:00 UTC+8	Çınkır 33', 50'; Altınöz 46'	Report	Lopez Mendy 18', 82'	Stadium: Dynamic Herb Sports Complex

October 16, 2022 9	Mendiola 1991	0-7	Kaya–Iloilo	Cavite
16:00 UTC+8		Report	Lopez Mendy 2', 63'; Menzi 21'; Horikoshi 29'; Giganto 55'; Fujii 67'; Melliza 84'	Stadium: City of Imus Grandstand and Track Oval

October 22, 2022 10	Maharlika Manila	1-4	Kaya–Iloilo	Cavite
16:00 UTC+8	Galasa 79'	Report	Horikoshi 5'; Giganto 35', 89'; Casambre 43'	Stadium: PFF National Training Center

October 30, 2022 11	Stallion Laguna	1-2	Kaya–Iloilo	Cavite
16:00 UTC+8	Belgira 41'	Report	Horikoshi 8'; Melliza 21'	Stadium: PFF National Training Center

November 12, 2022 12	Kaya–Iloilo	2-1	United City	Iloilo
15:00 UTC+8	Amita 35'; Gayoso 78'	Report	Daniels 45+2'	Stadium: Iloilo Sports Complex; Attendance: 1,899

=== Copa Paulino Alcantara ===
==== Elimination round ====
Pos	Team	Pld	W	D	L	GF	GA	GD	Pts	Qualification	KAY	CEB	UCT	ADT	STA	MAH	MEN
1	Kaya–Iloilo	6	5	1	0	13	3	+10	16	Semi-finals	—	3–0	1–1	4–0	—	—	—
2	Dynamic Herb Cebu	6	4	1	1	11	6	+5	13	Semi-finals	—	—	—	3–0	—	2–1	3–1
3	United City	6	2	4	0	10	2	+8	10	Semi-finals	—	1–1	—	4–0	—	4–0	—
4	Azkals Development Team	6	2	1	3	7	13	−6	7	Withdrew (Note: Did not participate in the semifinals due to inability to compete. The team forms core of the Philippine national U23 team which competed at the 2021 Southeast Asian Games.)	—	—	—	—	1–1	3–1	3–0
5	Stallion Laguna	6	0	4	2	4	7	−3	4	Semi-finals	2–3	0–2	0–0	—	—	—	—
6	Maharlika Manila	6	1	1	4	5	12	−7	4		0–1	—	—	—	1–1	—	2–1
7	Mendiola 1991	6	0	2	4	2	9	−7	2		0–1	—	0–0	—	0–0	—	—

Source: PFL (via Facebook)

March 14, 2022 1	Maharlika Manila	0–1	Kaya–Iloilo	Carmona
17:00 UTC+8			Horikoshi 47'	Stadium: PFF National Training Center

March 28, 2022 2	Kaya–Iloilo	1-1	United City	Carmona
19:15 UTC+8	Horikoshi 56'		Ott 34'	Stadium: PFF National Training Center

April 11, 2022 3	Mendiola 1991	0-1	Kaya–Iloilo	Carmona
16:00 UTC+8			Melliza 69'	Stadium: PFF National Training Center

April 20, 2022 4	Kaya–Iloilo	4-0	Azkals Development Team	Carmona
19:15 UTC+8	Lopez Mendy 20', 30'; Mitchell 24'; Horikoshi 80'			Stadium: PFF National Training Center

May 2, 2022 5	Stallion Laguna	2-3	Kaya–Iloilo	Carmona
16:00 UTC+8	Sy 61'; Nierras 70'		Mitchell 10'; Felongco 19'; Melliza 28'	Stadium: PFF National Training Center

May 12, 2022 6	Kaya–Iloilo	3-0	Dynamic Herb Cebu	Carmona
17:00 UTC+8	Arthur 14'; Horikoshi 33' (pen.), 59'			Stadium: PFF National Training Center

==== Semi-finals ====
May 17, 2022 Semi-final	Kaya–Iloilo	1–0	Stallion Laguna	Carmona
17:00 UTC+8	Horikoshi 86'			Stadium: PFF National Training Center; Referee: Mick Jon Pineda

==== Final ====
May 22, 2022 Final	Kaya–Iloilo	2-3	United City	Carmona
20:30 UTC+8	Lopez Mendy 14'; Melliza 32'		Daniels 11'; Minegishi 52'; Ott 69'	Stadium: PFF National Training Center; Attendance: 1,106

=== AFC Champions League ===
==== Qualifying preliminary round ====
8 March 2022	Sydney FC (Australia)	5–0	(Philippines) Kaya–Iloilo	Sydney
16:30 UTC+8	Buhagiar 30'; Bobô 47', 49' (pen.); Le Fondre 71', 81'	Report		Stadium: Jubilee Oval; Referee: Rowan Arumughan (India)

=== AFC Cup ===
==== Group stage ====
The draw for the group stage was held on 17 January 2022 at the AFC House in Kuala Lumpur, Malaysia. Kaya were drawn into Group G alongside Malaysia Super League runners-up Kedah Darul Aman, Indonesia Liga 1 champions Bali United, Hun Sen Cup winners Visakha. All matches will be held in Denpasar, Bali, Indonesia.

Pos	Team	Pld	W	D	L	GF	GA	GD	Pts	Qualification	KED	VIS	BAL	KAY
1	(Malaysia) Kedah Darul Aman	3	2	0	1	9	4	+5	6 (Note: Head-to-head standings: Tied on head-to-head points.; Head-to-head goal difference: Kedah Darul Aman: +2, Visakha FC –1, Bali United –1.; Head-to-head goals scored: Visakha FC 6, Bali United 4.)	Zonal semi-finals	—	5–1	—	4–1
2	(Cambodia) Visakha FC	3	2	0	1	8	8	0	6		—	—	5–2	—
3	(Indonesia) Bali United (H)	3	2	0	1	5	5	0	6		2–0	—	—	—
4	(Philippines) Kaya F.C.–Iloilo	3	0	0	3	2	7	−5	0		—	1–2	0–1	—

Source: AFC
Rules for classification: Tiebreakers
(H) Hosts
Notes:

24 June 2022	Kaya–Iloilo (Philippines)	1-2	(Cambodia) Visakha FC	Denpasar
--:-- UTC+8	Amita 30'	Report	Chansopheak 47'; Ty 59'	Stadium: Kapten I Wayan Dipta Stadium; Attendance: 821; Referee: Abdul Hakim Haidi (Brunei)

27 June 2022	Kedah Darul Aman (Malaysia)	4-1	(Philippines) Kaya–Iloilo	Denpasar
--:-- UTC+8	Fayadh 57', 90+3'; Al-Mardi 63'; Ngah 82'	Report	Gayoso 86'	Stadium: Kapten I Wayan Dipta Stadium; Attendance: 100; Referee: Payam Heidari (Iran)

30 June 2022	Kaya–Iloilo (Philippines)	0-1	(Indonesia) Bali United	Denpasar
--:-- UTC+8		Report	Mulyana 25'	Stadium: Kapten I Wayan Dipta Stadium; Attendance: 5,069; Referee: Shukri Al Hanfosh (Saudi Arabia)

== Statistics ==
=== Appearances ===
No.	Pos.	Player	PFL	Copa Paulino Alcantara	AFC Champions League	AFC Cup	Total
1	GK	(Philippines) Zach Banzon	1	6	1	0	8
2	GK	(Philippines) Kenry Balobo	6	2	0	0	8
4	MF	(Ghana) Patrick Arthur	5	4	0	1	10
5	DF	(Philippines) Camelo Tacusalme	4	0	0	0	4
6	MF	(Philippines) Oskari Kekkonen	6	4	1	3	14
7	FW	(Philippines) Jovin Bedic	9	6	1	3	19
8*	MF	(Philippines) Jesse Curran	0	5	1	0	6
8	MF	(Philippines) Marwin Angeles	10	0	0	0	10
9	FW	(Philippines) Eric Giganto	11	3	1	2	17
10	MF	(Philippines) Arnel Amita	7	7	0	3	17
12	DF	(Philippines) Mar Diano	9	7	1	2	19
13	MF	(Philippines) Jesus Melliza	11	8	1	3	23
14	MF	(Japan) Ryo Fujii	10	6	0	3	19
15	DF	(Philippines) Marco Casambre	11	0	0	0	11
16	GK	(Philippines) Quincy Kammeraad	5	0	0	3	8
17	FW	(Senegal) Robert Lopez Mendy	6	7	1	2	16
18	FW	(Philippines) Jarvey Gayoso	11	4	1	2	18
19	DF	(Trinidad and Tobago) Carlyle Mitchell	6	6	1	0	13
20	MF	(Japan) Daizo Horikoshi	11	8	1	2	22
21	MF	(Philippines) Sandro Reyes	0	3	1	3	7
22	MF	(Philippines) Fitch Arboleda	10	5	1	1	17
23	DF	(Philippines) Simone Rota	11	8	0	3	22
27	DF	(Philippines) Shirmar Felongco	6	5	0	3	14
44	DF	(Philippines) Audie Menzi	9	8	1	3	21

=== Goalscorers ===
No.	Pos.	Player	PFL	Copa Paulino Alcantara	AFC Champions League	AFC Cup	Total
4	MF	(Ghana) Patrick Arthur	0	1	0	0	1
7	FW	(Philippines) Jovin Bedic	3	0	0	0	3
9	FW	(Philippines) Eric Giganto	5	0	0	0	5
10	MF	(Philippines) Arnel Amita	1	0	0	1	2
13	MF	(Philippines) Jesus Melliza	2	3	0	0	5
14	MF	(Japan) Ryo Fujii	1	0	0	0	1
15	DF	(Philippines) Marco Casambre	1	0	0	0	1
17	FW	(Senegal) Robert Lopez Mendy	5	3	0	0	8
18	FW	(Philippines) Jarvey Gayoso	7	0	0	1	8
19	DF	(Trinidad and Tobago) Carlyle Mitchell	1	2	0	0	3
20	MF	(Japan) Daizo Horikoshi	7	6	0	0	13
27	MF	(Philippines) Shirmar Felongco	0	1	0	0	1
44	DF	(Philippines) Audie Menzi	1	0	0	0	1

=== Top assists ===
No.	Pos.	Player	PFL	Copa Paulino Alcantara	AFC Champions League	AFC Cup	Total
4	MF	(Ghana) Patrick Arthur	0	1	0	0	1
6	MF	(Philippines) Oskari Kekkonen	1	0	0	0	1
7	MF	(Philippines) Jovin Bedic	0	1	0	0	1
8	MF	(Philippines) Jesse Curran	0	1	0	0	1
9	FW	(Philippines) Eric Giganto	5	0	0	0	5
10	MF	(Philippines) Arnel Amita	5	0	0	0	5
12	DF	(Philippines) Mar Diano	1	0	0	0	1
13	MF	(Philippines) Jesus Melliza	2	3	0	0	5
14	MF	(Japan) Ryo Fujii	2	1	0	2	5
15	DF	(Philippines) Marco Casambre	1	0	0	0	1
18	FW	(Philippines) Jarvey Gayoso	1	0	0	0	1
20	MF	(Japan) Daizo Horikoshi	9	2	0	0	11
22	DF	(Philippines) Fitch Arboleda	2	0	0	0	2
23	DF	(Philippines) Simone Rota	1	0	0	0	1

=== Clean sheets ===
No.	Pos.	Player	PFL	Copa Paulino Alcantara	AFC Champions League	AFC Cup	Total
1	GK	(Philippines) Zach Banzon	0	4	0	0	4
2	GK	(Philippines) Kenry Balobo	3	1	0	0	4
16	GK	(Philippines) Quincy Kammeraad	2	0	0	0	2
