= 2022 Copa Paulino Alcantara =

4th season of the Copa Paulino Alcantara

Tournament details
- Country: Philippines
- Dates: March 14 – May 24
- Teams: 7

Final positions
- Champions: United City (2nd title)

Tournament statistics
- Matches played: 25
- Goals scored: 62 (2.48 per match)
- Top goal scorer(s): Daizo Horikoshi (6 goals)

The 2022 Copa Paulino Alcantara was the fourth edition of the Copa Paulino Alcantara, the domestic football cup competition of the Philippines. The 2022 edition marked the first time since the 2019 Copa Paulino Alcantara that matches are not held in a "bubble format", and also the first season in more than two years that allowed spectators to watch the matches, all of which are held at the PFF National Training Center in Carmona, Cavite. The final saw United City grab a narrow 3–2 win over defending champions Kaya–Iloilo in the highest-scoring final to date. As a result, United City won their second Copa title. They last won the title in the 2019, as Ceres–Negros.

== Scheduling ==
The COVID-19 pandemic still persists as of 2022, which led to the cancellation of the league tournament in 2021 and the commencement of the 2021 Copa Paulino Alcantara in its place. The 2022 Copa Paulino Alcantara is scheduled to start in March 14 with the final set to be held on May 23.

== Participating clubs ==
All seven clubs of the Philippines Football League participated. The 2021 season was cancelled and not held but the league had a new club, Dynamic Herb Cebu which already took part in the 2021 cup tournament. United City and Maharlika Manila are set to make a return after foregoing the 2021 cup tournament.

Philippines Football League
The 7 teams of the PFL
- Azkals Development Team
- Dynamic Herb Cebu
- Kaya–Iloilo
- Maharlika Manila
- Mendiola 1991
- Stallion Laguna
- United City

== Format ==
=== Competition ===
Unlike previous editions of the Copa, where the teams would be separated into different groups, this year's edition of the competition will see all the current teams of the Philippines Football League play against each other once. The 7 clubs, playing in what is dubbed as the "elimination round", will play against each other once. At the end of the elimination round, the top four teams will then meet each other in the semifinals, with the first-placed team facing the fourth-placed team, while the second-placed team faced the third-placed team, similar to the Finals Series in the inaugural PFL season. Just like in the 2021 edition, the losers of the semifinals will play each other in the third place match while the winners meet in the final, which will consist of a single match.

The Azkals Development Team initially finished fourth place in the elimination round, but due to the national team's participation in the 2021 Southeast Asian Games, the ADT were forced to cede their semifinal slot to Stallion Laguna, who finished fifth above Maharlika Manila on goal difference. The competition will be held in a closed-circuit format due to the COVID-19 pandemic. All matches will be held at the PFF National Training Center in Carmona, Cavite.

== Elimination round ==
Pos	Team	Pld	W	D	L	GF	GA	GD	Pts	Qualification	KAY	CEB	UCT	ADT	STA	MAH	MEN
1	Kaya–Iloilo	6	5	1	0	13	3	+10	16	Semi-finals	—	3–0	1–1	4–0	—	—	—
2	Dynamic Herb Cebu	6	4	1	1	11	6	+5	13	Semi-finals	—	—	—	3–0	—	2–1	3–1
3	United City	6	2	4	0	10	2	+8	10	Semi-finals	—	1–1	—	4–0	—	4–0	—
4	Azkals Development Team	6	2	1	3	7	13	−6	7	Withdrew (Note: Did not participate in the semifinals due to inability to compete. The team forms core of the Philippine national U23 team which competed at the 2021 Southeast Asian Games.)	—	—	—	—	1–1	3–1	3–0
5	Stallion Laguna	6	0	4	2	4	7	−3	4	Semi-finals	2–3	0–2	0–0	—	—	—	—
6	Maharlika Manila	6	1	1	4	5	12	−7	4		0–1	—	—	—	1–1	—	2–1
7	Mendiola 1991	6	0	2	4	2	9	−7	2		0–1	—	0–0	—	0–0	—	—

Source: PFL (via Facebook)

March 14, 2022 1	Maharlika Manila	0–1	Kaya–Iloilo	Carmona
17:00 UTC+8		Report	Horikoshi 47'	Stadium: PFF National Training Center

March 21, 2022 2	Maharlika Manila	2–1	Mendiola 1991	Carmona
17:00 UTC+8	G. Clarino 49'; M. Clarino 77'	Report	Flores 44'	Stadium: PFF National Training Center; Referee: Meliton Pelayo

March 24, 2022 3	United City	4–0	Maharlika Manila	Carmona
17:00 UTC+8	Robertson 23'; Sendra 26'; Ouano 44'; Minegishi 73'	Report		Stadium: PFF National Training Center; Referee: Mick Jon Pineda

March 28, 2022 4	Azkals Development Team	3–0	Mendiola 1991	Carmona
16:00 UTC+8	Woods 45+2' (pen.); Guerrero 74'; Ocampo 82'	Report		Stadium: PFF National Training Center; Referee: Mick Jon Pineda

March 28, 2022 5	Kaya–Iloilo	1–1	United City	Carmona
19:15 UTC+8	Horikoshi 56'	Report	Ott 34'	Stadium: PFF National Training Center; Referee: Clifford Daypuyat

March 31, 2022 6	United City	4–0	Azkals Development Team	Carmona
17:00 UTC+8	Sendra 12'; Juraboev 21'; Ouano 71'; Daniels 89'	Report		Stadium: PFF National Training Center; Referee: Meliton Pelayo

April 4, 2022 7	Mendiola 1991	0–0	United City	Carmona
17:00 UTC+8		Report		Stadium: PFF National Training Center; Referee: Meliton Pelayo

April 11, 2022 8	Mendiola 1991	0–1	Kaya–Iloilo	Carmona
16:00 UTC+8		Report	Melliza 68'	Stadium: PFF National Training Center; Referee: Meliton Pelayo

April 11, 2022 9	Azkals Development Team	1–1	Stallion Laguna	Carmona
19:15 UTC+8	Woods 87'	Report	Nogueira 19'	Stadium: PFF National Training Center; Referee: Mick Jon Pineda

April 20, 2022 10	Mendiola 1991	0–0	Stallion Laguna	Carmona
16:00 UTC+8		Report		Stadium: PFF National Training Center; Referee: Clifford Daypuyat

April 20, 2022 11	Kaya–Iloilo	4–0	Azkals Development Team	Carmona
19:15 UTC+8	Lopez Mendy 19', 29'; Mitchell 23'; Horikoshi 80'	Report		Stadium: PFF National Training Center; Referee: Linjun Talaver

April 25, 2022 12	Stallion Laguna	0–2	Dynamic Herb Cebu	Carmona
16:00 UTC+8		Report	Uzoka 33'; Corsame 90'	Stadium: PFF National Training Center; Referee: Linjun Talaver

April 25, 2022 13	Azkals Development Team	3–1	Maharlika Manila	Carmona
19:15 UTC+8	Bias 23'; Ocampo 24'; Chung 89'	Report	Kim Sung-min 66'	Stadium: PFF National Training Center; Referee: Mick Jon Pineda

April 28, 2022 14	Dynamic Herb Cebu	3–0^{a}	Azkals Development Team	Carmona
				Stadium: PFF National Training Center

May 2, 2022 15	Stallion Laguna	2–3	Kaya–Iloilo	Carmona
16:00 UTC+8	Sy 61'; Nierras 70'	Report	Mitchell 10'; Felongco 18'; Melliza 28'	Stadium: PFF National Training Center; Referee: Linjun Talaver

May 2, 2022 16	Dynamic Herb Cebu	3–1	Mendiola 1991	Carmona
19:15 UTC+8	Çınkır 57', 73'; Altınöz 90+3'		Hajimehdi 42' (pen.)	Stadium: PFF National Training Center; Referee: Clifford Daypuyat

May 5, 2022 17	Dynamic Herb Cebu	2–1	Maharlika Manila	Carmona
17:00 UTC+8	Çınkır 37'; Borlongan 56'		Kim Sung-min 69'	Stadium: PFF National Training Center; Referee: Mick Jon Pineda

May 8, 2022 18	United City	1–1	Dynamic Herb Cebu	Carmona
17:00 UTC+8	Sendra 6'		Patalinghug 70'	Stadium: PFF National Training Center; Referee: Mick Jon Pineda

May 8, 2022 19	Maharlika Manila	1–1	Stallion Laguna	Carmona
20:15 UTC+8	Silva 87' (o.g.)		Sy 48'	Stadium: PFF National Training Center; Referee: Clifford Daypuyat

May 12, 2022 20	Kaya–Iloilo	3–0	Dynamic Herb Cebu	Carmona
17:00 UTC+8	Arthur 14'; Horikoshi 33' (pen.), 59'	Report		Stadium: PFF National Training Center; Referee: Clifford Daypuyat

May 12, 2022 21	Stallion Laguna	0–0	United City	Carmona
20:15 UTC+8		Report		Stadium: PFF National Training Center; Referee: Meliton Pelayo

Notes:

a Dynamic Herb Cebu was awarded a 3–0 win due to ADT's inability to compete. The ADT forms the core of the Philippine national U23 team which held a training camp in Malaysia as part of its preparation for the 2021 Southeast Asian Games.

== Knock-out stage ==
Semi-finals
P1	Kaya–Iloilo	1
P5	Stallion Laguna	0
P2	Dynamic Herb Cebu	0
P3	United City	1

Final
W1	Kaya–Iloilo	2
W2	United City	3
Third place
L1	Stallion Laguna	2
L2	Dynamic Herb Cebu	1

=== Semi-finals ===
May 17, 2022 Semi-final	Kaya–Iloilo	1–0	Stallion Laguna	Carmona
17:00 UTC+8	Horikoshi 86'			Stadium: PFF National Training Center; Referee: Mick Jon Pineda

May 17, 2022 Semi-final	Dynamic Herb Cebu	0–1	United City	Carmona
21:00 UTC+8			Lyngbø 60'	Stadium: PFF National Training Center; Referee: Meliton Pelayo

=== Third place play-off ===
May 22, 2022 Third place	Stallion Laguna	2–1	Dynamic Herb Cebu	Carmona
17:00 UTC+8	Sy 17'; Bedia 88'		Çınkır 34'	Stadium: PFF National Training Center; Referee: Mick Jon Pineda

=== Final ===
May 22, 2022 Final	Kaya–Iloilo	2–3	United City	Carmona
20:30 UTC+8	Lopez Mendy 14'; Melliza 32'		Daniels 11'; Minegishi 52'; Ott 69'	Stadium: PFF National Training Center; Referee: Clifford Daypuyat

== Top scorers ==
Team eliminated / inactive for this round.

Rank	Player	Team	MD1	MD2	MD3	MD4	MD5	MD6	SF	3P	F	Total
1	(Japan) Daizo Horikoshi	Kaya–Iloilo	1	1		1		2	1			6
2	(Turkey) Arda Çınkır	Dynamic Herb Cebu			2	1				1		4
3	(Senegal) Robert Lopez Mendy	Kaya–Iloilo				2					1	3
3	(Philippines) Jesus Melliza	Kaya–Iloilo			1		1				1	3
3	(Argentina) Ricardo Sendra	United City	1		1		1					3
3	(Senegal) Abou Sy	Stallion Laguna				1	1			1		3
7	(Philippines) Kenshiro Daniels	United City			1						1	2
7	(South Korea) Kim Sung-min	Maharlika Manila				1	1					2
7	(Philippines) Hikaru Minegishi	United City	1								1	2
7	(Trinidad and Tobago) Carlyle Mitchell	Kaya–Iloilo				1	1					2
7	(Philippines) Lance Ocampo	ADT	1				1					2
7	(Philippines) Mike Ott	United City		1							1	2
7	(Philippines) Ivan Ouano	United City	1		1							2
7	(Philippines) Scott Woods	ADT	1		1							2

== Awards ==
Award	Winner	Club
Golden Ball	(Philippines) Mike Ott	United City
Golden Boot	(Japan) Daizo Horikoshi	Kaya–Iloilo
Golden Glove	(Philippines) Anthony Pinthus	United City
