= 2022–23 Philippines Football League =

5th season of the Philippines Football League

Philippines Football League
- Season: 2022–23
- Dates: August 7, 2022 – June 11, 2023
- Champions: Kaya–Iloilo; 1st title
- AFC Champions League: Kaya–Iloilo
- AFC Cup: Dynamic Herb Cebu; Stallion Laguna
- Matches: 84
- Goals: 283 (3.37 per match)
- Top goalscorer: Daizo Horikoshi (15 goals)
- Best goalkeeper: Florencio Badelic Jr. Anthony Pinthus (4 clean sheets)
- Biggest home win: Dynamic Herb Cebu 7–1 Mendiola 1991 (September 16)
- Biggest away win: Mendiola 1991 0–7 Kaya–Iloilo (October 16)
- Highest scoring: Dynamic Herb Cebu 7–1 Mendiola 1991 (September 16); Mendiola 1991 2–6 Dynamic Herb Cebu (September 24)
- Longest winning run: Kaya–Iloilo (Feb 26 – Apr 14) (6 matches)
- Longest unbeaten run: Dynamic Herb Cebu (Aug 20 – May 24) (23 matches)
- Longest winless run: Maharlika Manila (Aug 7 – Mar 4) (14 matches)
- Longest losing run: United City (Nov 12 – June 11) (12 matches)
- Highest attendance: 1,899 Kaya–Iloilo 2–1 United City (November 12)
- Lowest attendance: 0 (behind closed doors) Stallion Laguna 2–0 Mendiola 1991 (August 8)

The 2022–23 Philippines Football League was the fifth season of Philippines Football League (PFL), the professional football league of the Philippines. This is the second season of the PFL under the sponsorship of Qatar Airways. The season began on August 7, 2022, and concluded on June 11, 2023, marking the first time during the Philippines Football League era that a season takes place in an inter-year format. The league was initially contested by seven teams (later reduced to five), and played each other four times during the season.

The 2021 Philippines Football League season was planned to commence in late 2021 but was cancelled due to the COVID-19 pandemic, and was eventually replaced by the league cup tournament, the 2021 Copa Paulino Alcantara. Marking a change in the format of the previous seasons, the 2022 Copa Paulino Alcantara was held before the league season, with United City emerging as first-time winners of the competition. The success of the Copa, as well as the easing of COVID-19 restrictions and the return of fans, prompted the league season to resume in August.

The 2022 season saw the first time since 2019 that teams will play home and away. Several changes were witnessed in the league's system, such as the format changing from an intra-year to an inter-year format, with seasons spanning two years rather than one. After changing the foreigner restrictions in the Copa Paulino Alcantara, the league also increased its foreigner count from 3+1 to 5+1, adhering to the new AFC regulations. While all matches were held at the PFF National Training Center for the 2020 season, matches are played in the home stadiums of the PFL clubs for the 2022 season, with plans to allow fans back after the success of the 2022 Copa Paulino Alcantara. Dynamic Herb Cebu is the only new team competing for this season.

Kaya–Iloilo secured their first league title on May 24, 2023 with one match to spare.

Sponsored by Qatar Airways, the competition is officially known as The 2022–23 Philippines Football League brought to you by Qatar Airways.

== Format changes ==
Since the league was last held in 2020, there have been several changes. All six teams of the 2020 season are set to compete, with Dynamic Herb Cebu being the new team joining after previously competing in the 2021 and 2022 editions of the Copa Paulino Alcantara. While the 2020 edition was held under closed-circuit format to limit the spread of COVID-19, this season marks the first time since 2019 that the league reverts to a home-and-away Round-robin tournament, with all teams playing each other 4 times, for a total of 24 matches.

Since the 2020 Philippines Football League, several clubs have undergone location changes. United City, who previously competed without a home city and stadium, will be temporarily based in Capas, Tarlac, while their stadium is under construction. After the 2022–23 season, they will rename to United Clark from United City. Maharlika Manila, who also competed without a home stadium but represented the city of Manila, will play their games at the Rizal Memorial Stadium.

The most noticeable change this season is the league changing its format for scheduling. Previously, the league followed the scheduling system of most Asian leagues such as the Singapore Premier League or Malaysia Super League. However, in 2022, the Asian Football Confederation changed its system of scheduling, shifting from an intra- to an inter-year system. Several leagues followed this, such as the Thai League 1, the Indonesia Liga 1, and the Indian Super League, prompting the PFL to switch to this format as well.

== Teams ==
All 6 clubs from the previous PFL season are set to compete, with Maharlika Manila and United City competing for the first time in 2 years, having taken a break during the 2021 Copa Paulino Alcantara. Dynamic Herb Cebu were given a provisional club license, which would have allow the club to debut in the cancelled 2021 season, but due to the season's cancellation, 2022 was their first league season in the Philippine top flight.

Two potential new entries in the 2022 season were LAOS (Leyte Association of Organized Sports), who last competed in the 2016 United Football League, and new club Rapids F.C. from Cagayan de Oro. The two clubs started their license application process at the same time as Dynamic Herb Cebu. However, the PFF approved Cebu's license while the other two clubs' licenses were still found lacking in requirements. United City withdrew mid-season in February 2023. Azkal Development Team soon withdrew as well in May 2023.

=== Stadiums and locations ===
Several of the teams have nominated venues as temporary home venues due to their home stadiums being under construction. United City is temporarily based in the New Clark City Athletics Stadium, while Mendiola 1991 is temporarily holding their home matches in the City of Imus Grandstand and Track Oval. United City plan to hold their future home matches in their "field of dreams" in Pampanga while Mendiola 1991 will build their stadium in Taytay, Rizal.

In February 2022, the McKinley Hill Stadium in Taguig was approved by the PFL as Maharlika Manila's home stadium.

Team	Location	Stadium	Capacity
Azkals Development Team	Carmona, Cavite	PFF National Training Center	1,000
Dynamic Herb Cebu	Talisay, Cebu	Dynamic Herb Sports Complex	550
Kaya–Iloilo	Iloilo City, Iloilo	Iloilo Sports Complex	7,000
Maharlika Manila	Manila, Metro Manila	Rizal Memorial Stadium (until February 2023)	12,873
Maharlika Manila	Taguig, Metro Manila	McKinley Hill Stadium (February 2023 onwards)	2,000
Mendiola 1991	Imus, Cavite	City of Imus Grandstand and Track Oval	4,800
Stallion Laguna	Biñan, Laguna	Biñan Football Stadium	3,000
United City	Capas, Tarlac	New Clark City Athletics Stadium	20,000

Home venues of PFL clubs
2022–23 Philippines Football League is located in Philippines	Calabarzon
2022–23 Philippines Football League is located in Philippines	2022–23 Philippines Football League is located in Calabarzon

=== Personnel and kits ===
As part of the criteria imposed by the sponsorship of Qatar Airways, each team's kit should contain the Qatar Airways logo where the manufacturer's logo would usually be. The official logo of the PFL should also be placed on one of the sleeves of the kit.

Team	Head coach	Captain	Kit manufacturer	Sponsors
Azkals Development Team	(Philippines) Stephan Schröck	(Philippines) Quincy Kammeraad	(Philippines) Monté	4Gives^{1}, Chooks-to-Go^{2}, PHSD^{4}
Dynamic Herb Cebu	(Turkey) Mehmet Kakil	(Philippines) Nathanael Villanueva	(Philippines) RAD Apparel	WinZir^{1}, Leylam^{2}, Beko^{3}, Tigertek Sports^{4}, Pocari Sweat, The Green Table
Kaya–Iloilo	(Japan) Yu Hoshide	(Philippines) Jovin Bedic	(Philippines) LGR	LBC^{1}, Fitogether^{2}, ICanServe^{4}, Peakform, Pretty Huge
Maharlika Manila	(Philippines) Roxy Dorlas	(Philippines) David Basa	(United States) Equipt Studios	AIA^{1}, Reparil Ice-Spray^{2}, Elan Vita^{3}, Wheyl Nutrition, Kinetix Lab
Mendiola 1991	(Philippines) Joel Villarino	(Philippines) Jim Ashley Flores	(Philippines) Ropa	Vill-Mell Trading, Jon Enterprises, Thunderbird Feed, Best Diagnostic
Stallion Laguna	(Philippines) Ernest Nierras	(Philippines) Ruben Doctora	(Philippines) Cutz Apparel	Giligan's Restaurant^{1}, Airlock389^{2}, South Coast Industrial Door^{3}, Pi Tracer
United City	(Spain) Joan Esteva	(South Africa) Alan Robertson	(Philippines) Chronos Athletics	Allianz^{1}, Gravity Sport^{3}, Sportskred, Rsportz, BCDA, Klean Athlete

Notes:

1. Located on the front of the shirt.
2. Located on the back of the shirt.
3. Located on the sleeves.
4. Located on the shorts.

=== Coaching changes ===
Team	Outgoing coach	Manner of departure	Date of vacancy	Position in table	Incoming coach	Date of appointment
Maharlika Manila	(Philippines) Arvin Soliman	End of contract	Undisclosed	Pre-season	(South Korea) Jeongil Kim	February 20, 2022
Mendiola 1991	(Philippines) Dan Padernal	Personal Reasons	February 2022	Pre-season	(Philippines) Christopher Pedimonte	March 10, 2022
Azkals Development Team	(Philippines) Giovanni Villagracia	Undisclosed	January 2022	Pre-season	(Philippines) Norman Fegidero	March 11, 2022
Dynamic Herb Cebu	(Philippines) Oliver Colina	Appointed by Philippines U23	March 14, 2022	Pre-season	(Turkey) Mehmet Kakil	March 18, 2022
Azkals Development Team	(Philippines) Norman Fegidero	Undisclosed	June 2022	Pre-season	(Philippines) Giovanni Villagracia	June 23, 2022
Mendiola 1991	(Philippines) Christopher Pedimonte	Appointed by Philippines U17	July 2022	Pre-season	(Philippines) Joel Villarino	July 31, 2022
United City	(Philippines) Franklin Muescan	Demoted to assistant coach	September 17, 2022	2nd	(Spain) Joan Esteva	September 19, 2022
Maharlika Manila	(South Korea) Jeongil Kim	Mutual consent	September 21, 2022	7th	(Philippines) Arman Esteban	September 22, 2022
Maharlika Manila	(Philippines) Arman Esteban	End of contract	Undisclosed	7th	(Philippines) Roxy Dorlas	January 2023
Azkals Development Team	(Philippines) Giovanni Villagracia	Demoted to assistant coach	February 2023	4th	(Philippines) Stephan Schröck	February 25, 2023

== Foreign players ==
A maximum of six foreigners are allowed per club, with five players of any nationality and a sixth coming from an AFC member nation. This is in line with the upcoming AFC regulations that allow for more foreigners to be signed by clubs. However, only 4 foreign players can be registered in the starting 11 during a matchday, with one of them being from an AFC member nation. A further two foreign substitutes may be placed on the bench.

Players name in bold indicates the player was registered during the mid-season transfer window. The window lasted from 1 January 2023 to 26 March 2023, with the initial deadline for registered squads set on February 9.

Club	Players						Former players^{1}
Azkals Development Team	Withdrew mid-season						
Dynamic Herb Cebu	(Canada) **Leaford Allen**	(Turkey) Mert Altınöz	(Japan) **Rintaro Hama**	(Ivory Coast) Marius Kore	(Ghana) **Ibrahim Moro**	(Guinea) Mohamed Soumah	(Turkey) Arda Çınkır (Japan) Ren Okuda
Kaya–Iloilo	(Iran) **Milad Behgandom**	(Japan) Daizo Horikoshi	(Japan) **Tamon Horikoshi**	(Senegal) Robert Lopez Mendy	(Japan) **Dylan Nobiraki**		(Japan) Ryo Fujii (Trinidad and Tobago) Carlyle Mitchell (Ghana) Patrick Arthur
Maharlika Manila	(Ghana) **David Asare**	(South Korea) Kim Sungmin	(Equatorial Guinea) **Ben Konaté**	(Senegal) **Ibrahima Ndour**	(Nigeria) **Emmanuel Otuyemi**	(United States) Bienvenido Villaflor	(Ghana) Isaac Essel (Cameroon) Frank Baring (Cameroon) Boris Moundang (The Gambia) Ousman Jeng
Mendiola 1991	(Lebanon) **Ali Ghamloush**	(Iran) **Hamed Hajimehdi**	(Cameroon) Serge Kaole	(Iran) **Mahdi Keyghobadi**	(Iran) **Mahan Rahmani**	(Cameroon) Junior Ngong Sam	(Ghana) Stephen Appiah (Senegal) Alassane Wade (Cameroon) Henri Bandeken (South Korea) Kim Min-su
Stallion Laguna	(United States) **Kraig Bonanken**	(Japan) **Yusuke Hayashi**	(United States) Rafael Nogueda	(United States) **Abraham Placito**	(Japan) **Kosuke Uchida**	(Senegal) Abou Sy	(Iran) Hamed Hajimehdi (Mexico) Juan Trujillo (Brazil) Leonardo Nogueira (Brazil) Gabriel Silva (Iran) Amir Memari
United City	Withdrew mid-season						(Tajikistan) Amirbek Juraboev (Norway) Simen Lyngbø^{2} (South Africa) Alan Robertson (Argentina) Ricardo Sendra

Notes

1. Former players only include players who left after the start of the 2022–23 season.
2. Jesse Curran was originally a citizen of Australia but was called up by the Philippines national football team to participate in the 2022 FAS Tri-Nations Series, while Simen Lyngbø was considered a Norwegian import until he played for the Philippines in the 2022 AFF Championship.

Foreign players by confederation
AFC	Japan (6), Iran (3), South Korea (1), Lebanon (1)
CAF	Ghana (1), Cameroon (2), Senegal (3), Guinea (1), Ivory Coast (1), Equatorial Guinea (1), Togo (1), Nigeria (1)
CONCACAF	United States (5), Canada (1)
UEFA	Turkey (1)

== League table ==
Pos	Team	Pld	W	D	L	GF	GA	GD	Pts	Qualification or relegation
1	Kaya–Iloilo (C)	22	18	1	3	70	20	+50	55	Qualification for the 2023–24 AFC Champions League
2	Dynamic Herb Cebu	22	15	6	1	52	23	+29	51	Qualification for the 2023–24 AFC Cup
3	Stallion Laguna	22	11	2	9	39	26	+13	35	Qualification for the 2023–24 AFC Cup
—	United City	12	7	3	2	27	13	+14	24	Withdrew
—	Azkals Development Team (Note: The Azkals Development Team were a guest team for the PFL and ineligible to qualify for AFC club competitions.) (G)	22	6	3	13	26	39	−13	21	Withdrew
4	Mendiola 1991	22	5	0	17	19	66	−47	15	
5	Maharlika Manila	22	2	1	19	14	60	−46	7	

Source: PFL
Rules for classification: 1) Points; 2) Goal Difference; 3) Goals scored
(C) Champions; (G) Guests

== Positions by round ==
Team ╲ Round	1	2	3	4	5	6	7	8	9	10	11	12	13	14	15	16	17	18	19	20	21	22	23	24
Azkals Development Team	4	4	3	3	4	4	5	5	5	5	4	4	4	3	3	4	4	4	4	4	4	4	4	4
Dynamic Herb Cebu	6	5	5	5	3	3	3	3	2	2	2	2	2	2	2	2	2	2	2	2	2	2	2	2
Kaya–Iloilo	3	2	1	1	1	1	1	2	1	1	1	1	1	1	1	1	1	1	1	1	1	1	1	1
Maharlika Manila	7	6	6	7	7	7	7	7	7	7	7	7	7	7	7	7	7	7	7	7	7	7	7	7
Mendiola 1991	5	7	7	6	6	6	6	6	6	6	6	6	6	6	6	6	6	6	6	6	6	6	6	6
Stallion Laguna	2	3	4	4	5	5	4	4	4	4	5	5	5	5	5	3	3	3	3	3	3	3	3	3
United City	1	1	2	2	2	2	2	1	3	3	3	3	3	4	4	5	5	5	5	5	5	5	5	5

Updated to match(es) played on June 11, 2023. Source:

== Results by round ==
Team ╲ Round	1	2	3	4	5	6	7	8	9	10	11	12	13	14	15	16	17	18	19	20	21	22	23	24
Azkals Development Team	L	W	W	D	L	W	L	D	D	L	W	W	W	W	L	L	L	L	W	L	L	L	L	L
Dynamic Herb Cebu	L	D	W	D	W	W	W	W	W	D	W	W	W	D	W	W	W	W	W	D	W	W	W	D
Kaya–Iloilo	W	W	W	W	W	L	W	L	W	W	W	W	L	W	W	W	W	W	W	D	W	W	W	W
Maharlika Manila	L	L	L	L	L	L	L	L	L	D	L	L	L	L	W	L	L	W	W	L	L	W	L	L
Mendiola 1991	L	L	L	W	L	L	L	L	L	L	L	W	W	L	L	L	L	L	W	L	L	W	W	W
Stallion Laguna	W	W	L	L	L	W	W	W	L	L	L	D	L	W	W	W	W	L	D	L	W	W	W	W
United City	W	W	D	L	W	W	W	W	D	D	W	L	L	L	L	L	L	L	L	L	L	L	L	L

Updated to match(es) played on June 11, 2023. Source:
W = Win; D = Draw; L = Loss

== Results ==
The seven clubs will play each other in two rounds of home and away matches. A total of 82 matches will be played. United City withdrew mid-season in February 2023 and will not feature in the second round.

=== First round ===
Home \ Away	ADT	CEB	KAY	MAH	MEN	STA	UCT
Azkals Development Team	—	0–0	0–1	4–0	3–0	0–2	3–0 (Note: Match was postponed due to an Influenza outbreak within the United City team. The PFL disciplinary committee later deemed the match a 3–0 win in favor of the ADT.)
Dynamic Herb Cebu	3–0 (Note: Match was postponed due to inclement weather caused by Typhoon Paeng. The PFL disciplinary committee later deemed the match a 3–0 win in favor of Cebu.)	—	3–2	5–1	7–1	0–0 (Note: Match was postponed due to unknown reasons. The match has been rescheduled to May 24, 2023.)	3–3
Kaya–Iloilo	1–0	3–0	—	4–1	6–1	3–0	2–1
Maharlika Manila	1–1	0–1	1–4	—	0–3	1–2	0–5
Mendiola 1991	1–3	2–6	0–7	1–0	—	0–4	0–5
Stallion Laguna	1–2	3–4	1–2	4–0	2–0	—	2–4
United City	2–2	1–1	2–0	1–0	2–0	1–0	—

Updated to match(es) played on March 24, 2022. Source:
Legend: Blue = home team win; Yellow = draw; Red = away team win.

=== Second round ===
Home \ Away	ADT	CEB	KAY	MAH	MEN	STA	UCT
Azkals Development Team	—	1–2	1–3	4–1	0–3	0–3	3–0
Dynamic Herb Cebu	3–0	—	1–1	2–0	1–0	1–0	3–0
Kaya–Iloilo	3–2	2–3	—	5–0	4–0	3–1	3–0
Maharlika Manila	3–0	1–2	1–5	—	1–2	0–1	3–0
Mendiola 1991	3–0	1–3	1–6	0–1	—	0–3	3–0
Stallion Laguna	3–0	1–1	0–3	4–1	2–0	—	3–0
United City	0–3	0–3	0–3	0–3	0–3	0–3	—

Updated to match(es) played on June 11, 2023. Source:
Legend: Blue = home team win; Yellow = draw; Red = away team win.

== Season statistics ==
=== Scoring ===
==== Top goalscorers ====
As of May 23, 2023

Rank	Player	Club	Goals
1	(Japan) Daizo Horikoshi	Kaya–Iloilo	15
2	(Philippines) Jarvey Gayoso	Kaya–Iloilo	12
3	(Turkey) Arda Çınkır	Dynamic Herb Cebu	8
3	(Philippines) Eric Giganto	Kaya–Iloilo	8
5	(Philippines) Jesus Melliza	Kaya–Iloilo	7
5	(Philippines) Chima Uzoka	Dynamic Herb Cebu	7
7	(Philippines) Kenshiro Daniels	United City	6
7	(Cameroon) Junior Ngong Sam	Mendiola 1991	6
9	(Philippines) Andres Aldeguer	ADT	5
9	(Turkey) Mert Altınöz	Dynamic Herb Cebu	5
9	(Philippines) Daniel Gadia	Dynamic Herb Cebu	5
9	(Senegal) Robert Lopez Mendy	Kaya–Iloilo	5
9	(Philippines) Griffin McDaniel	Stallion Laguna	5
9	(Argentina) Ricardo Sendra	United City	5

==== Top assists ====
As of May 27, 2023

Rank	Player	Club	Assists
1	(Japan) Daizo Horikoshi	Kaya–Iloilo	19
2	(Turkey) Mert Altınöz	Dynamic Herb Cebu	8
2	(Philippines) Jeremiah Borlongan	Dynamic Herb Cebu	8
4	(Philippines) Arnel Amita	Kaya–Iloilo	7
5	(Philippines) Griffin McDaniel	Stallion Laguna	6
5	(Philippines) Hikaru Minegishi	United City	6
7	(Turkey) Arda Çınkır	Dynamic Herb Cebu	5
7	(Philippines) Eric Giganto	Kaya–Iloilo	5
7	(Ivory Coast) Marius Kore	Dynamic Herb Cebu	5
7	(Philippines) Jesus Melliza	Kaya–Iloilo	5
7	(Mexico) Juan Trujillo	Stallion Laguna	5

==== Own goals ====
As of March 4, 2022

Rank	Player	Club	Own goals
1	(South Africa) Alan Robertson	United City	1
1	(Philippines) Richard Talaroc	Mendiola 1991	1
1	(Equatorial Guinea) Ben Konaté	Maharlika Manila	1

=== Hat-tricks ===
As of September 16, 2022

Player	Club	Result	Against	Date
(Philippines) Jarvey Gayoso	Kaya–Iloilo	4–1 (H)	Maharlika Manila	27 August 2022
(Turkey) Arda Çınkır^{4}	Dynamic Herb Cebu	7–1 (H)	Mendiola 1991	16 September 2022

Note

(H) – Home; (A) – Away

^{4} Player scored four goals

=== Clean sheets ===
As of June 4, 2023

Rank	Player	Club	Clean sheets
1	(Philippines) Florencio Badelic Jr.	United City; Dynamic Herb Cebu	4
1	(Philippines) Anthony Pinthus	United City	4
3	(Philippines) Michael Asong	Stallion Laguna	3
3	(Philippines) Kenry Balobo	Kaya–Iloilo	3
3	(Philippines) Zach Banzon	Kaya–Iloilo	3
3	(Philippines) Hayeson Pepito	Stallion Laguna	3
7	(Philippines) Joseph Ceniza	Mendiola 1991	2
7	(Philippines) Patrick Deyto	Stallion Laguna	2
7	(Philippines) Quincy Kammeraad	Kaya–Iloilo	2
7	(Philippines) Julian Schwarzer	ADT	2
7	(Philippines) Nathanael Villanueva	Dynamic Herb Cebu	2

=== Discipline ===
==== Red cards ====
As of June 11, 2023

Rank	Player	Team	Red cards
1	(Philippines) Simone Rota	Kaya–Iloilo	2
1	(Philippines) Daniel Gadia	Dynamic Herb Cebu	2
3	(Philippines) Arnel Amita	Kaya–Iloilo	1
3	(Ghana) Patrick Arthur	Kaya–Iloilo	1
3	(Philippines) Enzo Ceniza	Mendiola 1991	1
3	(Philippines) Charles Dabao	Dynamic Herb Cebu	1
3	(Philippines) Patrick Deyto	Stallion Laguna	1
3	(Philippines) Shirmar Felongco	Stallion Laguna	1
3	(Philippines) Nicolas Ferrer Jr.	Dynamic Herb Cebu	1
3	(Trinidad and Tobago) Carlyle Mitchell	Kaya–Iloilo	1
3	(United States) Rafael Nogueda	Stallion Laguna	1
3	(Philippines) Kenneth Payosalan	Mendiola 1991	1
3	(South Africa) Alan Robertson	United City	1
3	(Brazil) Gabriel Silva	Stallion Laguna	1

== Awards ==
The following awards were given at the conclusion of the tournament.

Award	Winner	Club
Golden Ball	(Japan) Daizo Horikoshi	Kaya—Iloilo
Golden Boot	(Japan) Daizo Horikoshi	Kaya—Iloilo
Golden Glove	(Philippines) Zach Banzon	Kaya—Iloilo

== Attendances ==
#	Football club	Average attendance
1	Kaya FC	231
2	Cebu FC	187
3	Stallion Laguna	156
4	Mendiola FC	124
5	Maharlika Manila	109
