= Kenry Balobo =

Filipino footballer (born 1998)

Personal information
- Full name: Kenry Abella Balobo
- Date of birth: September 22, 1998 (age 28)
- Place of birth: Cebu City, Philippines
- Position: Goalkeeper

Team information
- Current team: Maharlika
- Number: 22

Youth career
- Don Bosco Technology Center

College career
Years	Team	Apps	(Gls)
2017–2019	San Beda University		

Senior career*
Years	Team	Apps	(Gls)
2020–2021	Mendiola 1991	4	(0)
2021–2022	United City	0	(0)
2022–2024	Kaya–Iloilo	9	(0)
2024–	Maharlika	28	(0)

International career^{‡}
2019	Philippines U23	1	(0)
- * Club domestic league appearances and goals as of 5:59, March 11, 2026 (UTC) ‡ National team caps and goals as of 02:29, July 26, 2024 (UTC)

Kenry Abella Balobo (born 22 September 1998) is a Filipino professional footballer who plays as a goalkeeper for Philippines Football League club Maharlika F.C..

== Youth career ==
Balobo was born in Cebu City in the Philippines. In his youth, he played football for Don Bosco Technical College-Cebu (then known as Don Bosco Technology Center) and was known for his shot-stopping abilities, especially with penalties.

His impressive performances gave him the opportunity to take his career further, and Balobo earned a scholarship to study and play for San Beda University. In his time at San Beda, he won two NCAA football titles in three years, winning a slew of individual awards such as 3 Best Goalkeeper Awards.

== Club career ==
=== Mendiola ===
After graduating from San Beda, Balobo was signed by an club affiliated with San Beda, Mendiola FC 1991 of the Philippines Football League. He made his debut on the opening matchday of the 2020 season, a 6–0 loss to United City. In the penultimate match against Kaya, he was at the forefront of the action as he made a number of saves to deny Kaya from scoring, giving United City the 2020 PFL title. During Mendiola's match against Maharlika Manila, he was substituted late on in the match as an outfielder.

=== United City ===
United City would be his next destination after the season's end, with the defending champions announcing his signing from Mendiola in early 2021 as part of their preparation for the club's debut in the 2021 AFC Champions League group stage. United City would end up finishing that season in third, with a win over Beijing Guoan. However, he didn't play in an official match for the club, as they suddenly withdrew from the 2021 Copa Paulino Alcantara in the latter half of the year.

=== Kaya–Iloilo ===
After his spell at United City, Balobo would sign for Kaya–Iloilo, the club he had shut out two years prior. During his time at the club he played backup to Zach Banzon, Quincy Kammeraad, and Walid Birrou, and slowly racked up 10 PFL appearances over his first two seasons. His stint also saw trophies come to Kaya, with the club winning the PFL back to back in 2022–23 and 2024, as well as the 2023 Copa Paulino Alcantara.

== International career ==
=== Philippines U14 ===
While still playing football in Cebu, Balobo was included by coach Oliver Colina to the Philippines U14 training camp that was being held there, which included members of the team dubbed "The Little Azkals".

=== Philippines U19 ===
Four years later, he was called up to the Philippine U19 National Team for the 2016 AFF U19 Championship, though he remained on the bench behind fellow San Beda keeper Michael Asong.

=== Philippines U23 ===
In 2019, he represented the country once more as a member of the U23 National Team. He was called up first to the 2019 AFF U22 Championship where he remained on the bench, but was called up again for the 2020 AFC U23 Championship Qualifiers, making his debut in between the sticks as the Philippines lost 3–0 to Malaysia.
