= 2020 Philippines Football League =

4th season of the Philippines Football League

Philippines Football League
- Season: 2020
- Dates: October 28 – November 9, 2020
- Champions: United City; 4th title
- AFC Champions League: United City; Kaya–Iloilo
- Matches: 15
- Goals: 46 (3.07 per match)
- Top goalscorer: Bienvenido Marañón (7 goals)
- Best goalkeeper: Anthony Pinthus; Louie Casas (3 clean sheets each)
- Highest scoring: Maharlika Manila 0–10 United City (November 3)
- Longest winning run: United City (Oct 28 – Nov 6) (4 matches)
- Longest unbeaten run: Kaya–Iloilo (Oct 28 – Nov 9) (5 matches)
- Longest winless run: Stallion Laguna (Oct 31 – Nov 12) (5 matches)
- Longest losing run: Stallion Laguna (Nov 6 – 12) (3 matches)

The 2020 Philippines Football League, also known as The Philippines Football League brought to you by Qatar Airways, due to the league's title sponsorship, was the fourth season of the Philippines Football League (PFL), the professional football league of the Philippines.

For the first time, the champion of the tournament qualified for the Group Stage of the 2021 AFC Champions League, which was expanded to 40 teams from previous 32.

Originally scheduled to start on March 21, 2020, the league was postponed due to the COVID-19 pandemic. The league was supposed to commence on October 25, 2020, under a shortened calendar with each club playing a total of only five matches. However the opener was postponed once again to October 28 due to five players and a coach testing positive for COVID-19, as well as due to anticipated inclement weather by Typhoon Molave (Quinta).

All matches were held at the PFF National Training Center in Carmona, Cavite. The 2020 season played under a bubble format with all players and staff restricted to the Seda Nuvali hotel in Santa Rosa, Laguna, where they were checked-in for the entire duration of the season, and the playing venue in Carmona.

United City, which had been rebranded from Ceres–Negros starting this season, are the three-time defending champions. As Ceres–Negros, they have won every season of top-tier Philippine professional league football so far in the PFL era. They successfully defended their title when they won 7–1 against Stallion Laguna on November 6, 2020, with one match to spare and winning its previous three matches. Kaya–Iloilo became the first-ever team in PFL history to remain unbeaten during the duration of the league and not win the title.

== Impact of the COVID-19 pandemic ==
=== Postponement ===
Due to the COVID-19 pandemic, the league's commencement, originally scheduled for March 21, was postponed at two times. First, the league's opening match was moved to April 18, and was later moved again to late-May. The league adopted a double home-and-away format for the 2020 seasons, with each club playing against each other four times for a total of 60 matches.

The Philippine Football Federation (PFF) is planning to start the league on July 15 with practice sessions for the league's member clubs planned to commence on June 15. The PFF has submitted a 27-page document outlying the protocols on how to organize the league amidst the pandemic to the Games and Amusements Board (GAB) on May 30 for approval prior to sending the same to the Inter-Agency Task Force for the Management of Emerging Infectious Diseases (IATF-EID) on June 1.

The IATF-EID announced on July 3, that it has allowed the clubs of the PFL to conduct training. The PFF plans to start the season on August 15. Staff and players of the member PFL clubs underwent RT-PCR testing for COVID-19 on July 8, 2020.

A joint administration order by GAB, the Department of Health, and the Philippine Sports Commission was released within the July 2020, but start of training was postponed due to the re-imposition of modified enhanced community quarantine in Metro Manila and nearby provinces from August 4 to 18. GAB and the IATF allowed the league to start. The PFF spent an estimated amount of ₱6 million just to start the postponed season.

The kickoff of the league on October 25 was postponed due to expected inclement weather conditions caused by Typhoon Molave (Quinta). Also nine people including five players and a coach from two clubs tested positive for COVID-19. The league organizers maintained that the disease has been contained and the season began on October 28, 2020.

=== Format changes ===
Due to the league's postponement, the league for the 2020 season feature a shortened calendar to be played under a single round-robin format, instead of a double round-robin format with each team playing only five matches for the whole season. Several situational calendars have been prepared for the planning of the league's schedule.

There was a prior plan to adopt a playoff finals consisting of a semifinals and finals phase after the regular season. The league last had a playoff finals in the 2017 season which was known as the Final Series. This plan was scrapped in favor of a shorter schedule to minimize injury risk for the league's players.

The Copa Paulino Alcantara for the 2020 season was cancelled due to the time constraints caused by the postponement of the league. Due to this, the league second placers will qualify for the 2021 AFC Champions League playoffs scheduled for February 2021.

=== Bubble ===
PFL Bubble venues
1 PFF National Training Center
2 Seda Nuvali

Due to the COVID-19 pandemic players and staff of the PFL for the 2020 season were confined in a "bubble" setup. For the duration of the season they will only be allowed at the Seda Nuvali hotel in Santa Rosa, Laguna where they were checked-in and the PFF National Training Center in Carmona, Cavite where training and league matches were held. Players and staff underwent a series of test prior and shortly after entering the "bubble".

==== Schedule ====
The PFL bubble followed the schedule below:

Stage/round	Date(s)
Pre-bubble entry RT-PCR testing	October 16
Entry into the PFL bubble	October 21
League matches	October 28 – November 9

The league final match day which was originally scheduled on November 12, 2020, was cancelled due to Typhoon Vamco (Ulysses).

== Teams ==
Carmona, Cavite
PFF National Training Center
Capacity: 1,200
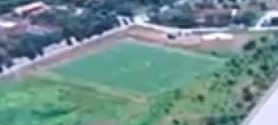
Location of the PFF National Training Center.

Six clubs, including the Azkals Development Team, participated in the 2020 season. Ceres-Negros rebranded as United City and competed under that name starting the 2020 season. Green Archers United and Philippine Air Force decided not to participate for this season. Newly formed Maharlika F.C. (later renamed Maharlika Manila F.C.) applied to join the league, which was eventually approved. After a scandal involving Global F.C. refusing to pay their players' salaries, the PFF and PFL ordered Global to comply with the regulations and sort out all their payments within 10 days. After 10 days, Global had still not paid, and therefore their case was referred to the PFF's Club Licensing First Instance Body (FIB), and rendered them unable to compete in the 2020 season. Appropriate licensing fees for applicant clubs were waived due to the COVID-19 pandemic.

=== Stadium ===
Most league matches were originally planned to be held at the Rizal Memorial Stadium instead of the club's designated home stadiums for the 2020 season. However, due to disruptions caused by the COVID-19 pandemic, all matches were held at the PFF National Training Center in Carmona, Cavite, approximately 6.70 kilometers (4.16 mi) south of Metro Manila. The clubs were requested to hold their training sessions at the venue.

The Rizal Memorial Stadium and the Biñan Football Stadium were ruled out as possible primary venues for the 2020 season due to the venues being close to COVID-19 quarantine/isolation facilities (at the Rizal Memorial Coliseum and the Alonte Sports Arena).

The Games and Amusements Board allowed training sessions to be held at the PFF National Training Center in Carmona and the Blue Pitch at the Circuit Makati in Makati, Metro Manila.

=== Personnel and kits ===
Team	Head coach	Captain	Kit manufacturer	Sponsors
Azkals Development Team	(Republic of Ireland) Scott Cooper	(Philippines) Marvin Angeles	(Philippines) LGR	Alphaland Corporation, Stream Mobile
Kaya–Iloilo	(Japan) Yu Hoshide	(Philippines) Jovin Bedic	(Germany) Adidas	LBC, Fitness First
Maharlika Manila	(Philippines) Roxy Dorlas	(Philippines) Jerry Barbaso	(Philippines) Gameville Sportswear	Philam Life, Reparil Ice-Spray, Arepa Nootropics
Mendiola 1991	(Philippines) Dan Padernal	(Philippines) Ashley Flores	(Indonesia) FAT	Penson and Company, Focus Athletics
Stallion Laguna	(Philippines) Ernest Nierras^{1}	(Philippines) Ruben Doctora	(Philippines) Cutz Apparel	Giligan's Restaurant, Pi Tracer, Airlock389
United City	(England) Trevor Morgan^{3}	(Philippines) Stephan Schröck	(Philippines) Montè	Manila Regenerative Center, Midas Magnesium, Gatorade

=== Coaching changes ===
Team	Outgoing coach	Manner of departure	Date of vacancy	Position in table	Incoming coach	Date of appointment
Kaya–Iloilo	(Philippines) Noel Marcaida	End of Contract	December 31, 2019	Pre-season	(Japan) Yu Hoshide^{2}	Unknown
United City	(Serbia) Risto Vidaković	Force Majeure	July 8, 2020	Pre-season	(England) Trevor Morgan^{3}	August 21, 2020
Maharlika Manila	None	N/A	N/A	Pre-season	(Philippines) Roxy Dorlas	August 24, 2020

Interim coach

1. (Philippines) Ernest Nierras was only able to join Stallion Laguna on November 2, 2020. Richard Leyble is Nierras' assistant coach.
2. (Philippines) Oliver Colina was interim head coach for the 2020 AFC Cup. He took a leave-of absence from his original teams, Leylam FC and the Sacred Heart School-Ateneo de Cebu (SHS-AdC) Magis Eagles. Yu Hoshide took over sometime prior to the beginning of the season.
3. (Philippines) Frank Muescan was named interim head coach by October 2020 prior to the start of the season due to Trevor Morgan not arriving yet despite being signed in as United City's coach.

== Foreign players ==
A maximum of four foreigners are allowed per club which follows the Asian Football Confederation's (AFC) '3+1 rule'; three players of any nationality and a fourth coming from an AFC member nation. However, the PFF waived the regulations for the 2020 season due to difficulties teams had in entering in the PFL bubble, such as player commitments and in-team COVID cases.

Club	Players				Former Players^{1}
Azkals Development Team	None				(Trinidad and Tobago) Darryl Roberts
Kaya–Iloilo	(Japan) Daizo Horikoshi	(Trinidad and Tobago) Carlyle Mitchell	(Japan) Masanari Omura	(Ghana) Emmanuel Osei	(Japan) Takumi Uesato
Maharlika Manila	(Cameroon) Henri Bandeken	(Spain) Joaco Cañas	(Democratic Republic of the Congo) Gary Epesso	(Cameroon) Serge Kaole	(Brazil) Daniel Matsunaga (South Korea) Kim Sung-min
Mendiola 1991	(Ghana) Stephen Appiah	(Iran) Hamed Hajimehdi	(Cameroon) Souleyman Ndepe	(Ivory Coast) Dini Ouattara	(Iran) Milad Behgandom
Stallion Laguna	(Ghana) Samuel Bonney	(South Korea) Kim Dongyeon	(Senegal) Ibrahima Ndour	(Argentina) Ricardo Sendra	(Senegal) Abou Sy
United City	(Spain) Bienvenido Marañón	(Japan) Takashi Odawara	(Senegal) Robert Lopez Mendy		(Spain) Súper

Notes

1. Includes pre-season signings of players who weren't able to enter the PFL Bubble.

Foreign players by confederation
AFC	Japan (3), Iran (1)
CAF	Ghana (3), Cameroon (3), Senegal (3), Ivory Coast (1), Democratic Republic of the Congo (1)
CONCACAF	Trinidad and Tobago (1)
CONMEBOL	Argentina (1)
UEFA	Spain (2)

== League table ==
Pos	Team	Pld	W	D	L	GF	GA	GD	Pts	Qualification
1	United City (C)	5	4	0	1	25	3	+22	12	Qualification for 2021 AFC Champions League group stage and 2022 AFC Champions League group stage (Note: As a result of the 2021 Philippines Football League being cancelled due to the COVID-19 pandemic in the Philippines, the PFF nominated the 2020 champions, United City, as the participating club in the 2021 AFC Champions League Group Stage.)
2	Kaya–Iloilo	5	3	2	0	5	2	+3	11	Qualification for 2021 AFC Champions League qualifying play-offs
3	Azkals Development Team (Note: The Azkals Development Team are a guest team for the PFL and ineligible to qualify for AFC club competitions.) (G)	5	3	0	2	9	2	+7	9	
4	Mendiola 1991	5	1	2	2	2	8	−6	5	Standby team for AFC Cup group stage (Note: Due to the COVID-19 pandemic in the Philippines, the 2020 Copa Paulino Alcantara was cancelled by the Philippine Football Federation. As a result, the 2020 Philippines Football League runners-up will qualify for the AFC Champions League qualifying play-offs, and the third place team will qualify for the 2021 AFC Cup unless the PFL runners-up fail to qualify for the AFC Champions League.)
5	Maharlika Manila	5	1	0	4	2	19	−17	3	
6	Stallion Laguna	5	0	2	3	3	12	−9	2	

Source: PFL
Rules for classification: 1) Points; 2) Goal difference; 3) Goals scored.
(C) Champions; (G) Guests

== Positions by round ==
Team ╲ Round	1	2	3	4	5
ADT	4	5	3	3	3
Kaya–Iloilo	1	2	2	2	2
Maharlika Manila	4	3	4	5	5
Mendiola 1991	6	6	6	4	4
Stallion Laguna	3	4	5	6	6
United City	1	1	1	1	1

Updated to match(es) played on November 9, 2020. Source:

== Results by round ==
Team ╲ Round	1	2	3	4	5
ADT	L	L	W	W	W
Kaya-Iloilo	W	W	D	D	W
Maharlika Manila	L	W	L	L	L
Mendiola	L	L	D	W	D
Stallion Laguna	L	D	L	L	D
United City	W	W	W	W	L

W = Win; D = Draw; L = Loss

== Results ==
Club	ADT	KAY	MAH	MEN	STA	UNI
Azkals Development Team	—	—	—	2–0	—	—
Kaya–Iloilo	1–0	—	1–0	0–0	—	—
Maharlika Manila	0–5	—	—	0–2	—	0–10
Mendiola 1991	—	—	—	—	0–0 (Note: Match was originally postponed due to Typhoon Vamco (Ulysses). However the match never took place and league records considered the match to be a goalless draw between Mendiola and Stallion.)	0–6
Stallion Laguna	0–2	1–1	1–2	—	—	—
United City	1–0	1–2	—	—	7–1	—

Source: PFL
Legend: Blue = left column team win; Yellow = draw; Red = top row team win.

== Season statistics ==
=== Scoring ===
==== Top goalscorers ====
As of November 9, 2020

Rank	Player	Club	Goals
1	(Spain) Bienvenido Marañón	United City	7
2	(Philippines) Mike Ott	United City	6
3	(Senegal) Robert Lopez Mendy	United City	5
4	(Philippines) Javier Gayoso	ADT	4
4	(Philippines) OJ Porteria	United City	4
6	(Philippines) Kenshiro Daniels	Kaya–Iloilo	2
6	(Senegal) Ibrahima Ndour	Stallion Laguna	2
6	(Philippines) Chima Uzoka	ADT	2

==== Top assists ====
As of November 6, 2020

Rank	Player	Club	Assists
1	(Philippines) Hikaru Minegishi	United City	6
2	(Senegal) Robert Lopez Mendy	United City	5
3	(Spain) Bienvenido Marañón	United City	4
4	(Philippines) Manny Ott	United City	3
4	(Philippines) Mike Ott	United City	3
6	(Philippines) Kenshiro Daniels	Kaya–Iloilo	2
6	(Philippines) Javier Gayoso	ADT	2
6	(Philippines) Yrick Gallantes	ADT	2
6	(Philippines) Lance Ocampo	ADT	2
6	(Philippines) OJ Porteria	United City	2

=== Hat-tricks ===
As of November 6, 2020

Player	Club	Result	Against	Date	Ref
(Spain) Bienvenido Marañón	United City	6–0 (A)	Mendiola 1991	October 31, 2020	
(Senegal) Robert Lopez Mendy	United City	10–0 (A)	Maharlika Manila	November 3, 2020	
(Philippines) OJ Porteria	United City	10–0 (A)	Maharlika Manila	November 3, 2020	
(Spain) Bienvenido Marañón	United City	7–1 (H)	Stallion Laguna	November 6, 2020	

=== Clean sheets ===
As of November 9, 2020

Rank	Player	Club	Clean sheets
1	(Philippines) Louie Casas	Kaya–Iloilo	3
1	(Philippines) Anthony Pinthus	United City	3
3	(Philippines) Anton Yared	ADT	2
4	(Philippines) Kenry Balobo	Mendiola 1991	1
4	(Philippines) Quincy Kammeraad	ADT	1
4	(Ivory Coast) Dini Ouattara	Mendiola 1991	1

=== Discipline ===
==== Red cards ====
As of November 6, 2020

Rank	Player	Club	Red Cards
1	(Philippines) Manuel Ott	United City	1
1	(Philippines) Anton del Rosario	Maharlika Manila	1

== Awards ==
The following awards were given on November 9, 2020.

Award	Winner	Club
Golden Ball	(Philippines) Stephan Schröck	United City
Golden Boot	(Spain) Bienvenido Marañón	United City
Golden Glove	(Philippines) Anthony Pinthus	United City
