= Emmanuel Carlos Osei =

Ghanaian footballer

Personal information
- Date of birth: December 25, 1992 (age 33)
- Place of birth: Accra, Ghana
- Height: 1.83 m (6 ft 0 in)
- Position: Forward

Team information
- Current team: Loyola

Senior career*
Years	Team	Apps	(Gls)
2008	Kotoku Royals		
2008–2010	All Stars		
2011	Liberty Professionals		
2012	Deportivo		
2013–2016	Ashanti Gold		
2016–2017	Asante Kotoko		
2017	→ Asokwa Deportivo (loan)		
2017	→ Bechem United (loan)		
2018	Dordoi Bishkek		(4)
2020–?	Kaya–Iloilo		
2024–	Loyola		

International career
	Ghana U17	2008-2009	
- * Club domestic league appearances and goals as of 01 April 2024

Emmanuel Carlos Osei (born 25 December 1992) is a Ghanaian professional footballer who plays as a forward for Loyola of the Philippines Football League (PFL).

== Career ==
=== Club ===
Osei signed a three-year contract with Asante Kotoko in June 2016. In February 2017, Osei moved to Bechem United on a season-long loan deal. Osei was released by Asante Kotoko in November 2017. On 11 January 2018, Osei signed for Dordoi Bishkek on a one-year contract, leaving by mutual agreement on 16 July 2018, having scored 4 league goals. In September 2018, Osei went on trial with Rwanda Premier League club Rayon Sports.

Osei was signed by Kaya–Iloilo for the 2020 Philippines Football League season.
