= Lance Ocampo =

Filipino footballer (born 2001)

Personal information
- Full name: Matt Lancelot Ocampo
- Date of birth: 23 September 2001 (age 25)
- Place of birth: Cebu, Philippines
- Height: 1.79 m (5 ft 10 in)
- Position: Midfielder

Youth career
- 2011–2013: Philippine Army FC
- 2013–2015: Loyola FC
- 2015–2019: GOM Football Center of Excellence

College career
Years	Team	Apps	(Gls)
2022–	Nagoya University of Commerce & Business		

Senior career*
Years	Team	Apps	(Gls)
2019	Global FC		
2020–2022	Azkals Development Team		(2)

International career
2022–	Philippines U23	11	(1)
- * Club domestic league appearances and goals

Matt Lancelot Ocampo (born 23 September 2001) is a Filipino footballer who played as a midfielder for the Nagoya University of Commerce & Business.

== Life and career ==
Ocampo was born on 23 September 2001 in Cebu, Philippines. He attended iAcademy in the Philippines. He studied software development. He mainly operates as a midfielder. He can also operate as a left-winger or as a right-winger. He is right-footed. In 2011, he joined the youth academy of Filipino side Philippine Army FC. In 2013, he joined the youth academy of Filipino side Loyola FC. In 2015, he joined the youth academy of Filipino side GOM Football Center of Excellence. He was recommended by Philippines international Mark Hartmann to Philippines national football team general manager Dan Palami.

Ocampo started his senior career with Filipino side Global FC. In 2020, he signed for Filipino side Azkals Development Team. He was described as "among the players making a mark with the ADT" while playing for the club. In 2022, he started attending Nagoya University of Commerce & Business in Japan. He played for their football team. He studied global business. He is a Philippines youth international. He played for the Philippines national under-23 football team at the 2022 AFF U-23 Championship. He also played for the Philippines national under-23 football team at the 2023 SEA Games. He was considered to be called up to the Philippines national football team for the 2020 AFF Championship.
