= Pretty Huge =

Philippine multi-sport and performance training facility

Pretty HUGE
- Former names: Pretty Huge Obstacles
- Address: SM Aura Premier, Bonifacio Global City
- Location: Taguig, Philippines
- Type: Multi-sports and performance training facility

Construction
- Opened: 1 February 2019

Website
- www.prettyhuge.com.ph

Pretty Huge (stylized as Pretty HUGE) is a multi-sports and performance training facility at the SM Aura Premier, Bonifacio Global City in Taguig, Metro Manila, Philippines. Originally established as a multi-level obstacle course racing, the facility was expanded to include a FIBA-grade indoor basketball court that may be used for other indoor sports and an elevated 100m race track.

== History ==
While already being used in 2018, the facility was officially launched on February 1, 2019 and opened to the general public on March 1, 2019. Pretty Huge Obstacles temporarily closed and underwent renovation during the COVID-19 pandemic, and reopened on June 1, 2022, with its rebranded name, 'Pretty Huge'.

== Facilities ==
Located inside the Civic Center at the SM Aura Premier, Pretty Huge covers an area of 2,300 m^{2} (25,000 sq ft) and the space offers amenities and training equipment.
