= Mehmet Kakil =

Turkish football manager (1967–2023)

Mehmet Kakil (1 January 1967 – 12 November 2023) was a Turkish football manager. He died on 12 November 2023, at the age of 56.

== Career ==
In 2023, Kakil was appointed manager of Filipino club Dynamic Herb Cebu.
