= Mert Altınöz =

Turkish footballer (born 2002)

Personal information
- Date of birth: 28 May 2002 (age 24)
- Place of birth: Hatay, Turkey
- Height: 1.76 m (5 ft 9 in)
- Position: Attacking midfielder

Team information
- Current team: Tire 2021 FK
- Number: 23

Youth career
- 2016–2021: Hatayspor

Senior career*
Years	Team	Apps	(Gls)
2021–2022	Hatayspor	0	(0)
2022–2023	Dynamic Herb Cebu	19	(5)
2023–2024	Elazığspor	8	(1)
2024–2025	Çayelispor	14	(2)
2025	Aliağa FK	6	(0)
2025–	Tire 2021 FK	7	(0)
- * Club domestic league appearances and goals as of 29 November 2025

Mert Altınöz (born 28 May 2002) is a Turkish footballer who plays as an attacking midfielder for TFF 3. Lig club Tire 2021 FK. Although he plays primarily as an attacking midfielder for his club, his versatility as a player means he can play a variety of roles across the midfield.

== Personal life ==
Altınöz was born in the province of Hatay in Turkey. He is described as "quick, dynamic, and creative with the ball at his feet". His younger brother, Ali, is currently playing for the U19 team of Süper Lig club Hatayspor.

== Club career ==
=== Youth ===
Altınöz signed with Turkish side Hatayspor as a youth player in 2016, eventually getting promoted from the youth academy to the U21 team in 2019, playing matches for Hatayspor's U21 and U19 teams.

=== Hatayspor ===
After spending 2 years in the Hatayspor youth teams, he signed his first professional contract with the club in 2021. He did not make a single appearance for the team in the Süper Lig, but played his first match for the club in a 2–1 win over Şanlıurfaspor in the Turkish Cup.

=== Dynamic Herb Cebu ===
In March 2022, it was announced by Hatay mayor Lütfü Savaş that Altınöz, along with Arda Çınkır and Nazım Özcan, his teammates, would be transferring to Philippines Football League side Dynamic Herb Cebu, as part of the club's partnership with the Turkish side. His signing was formally announced on 1 April 2022.

Altınöz made his debut for the club in the 2022 Copa Paulino Alcantara, the country's domestic cup competition, in a 2–0 win over Stallion Laguna. On 2 May 2022 he scored his first goal for the club in a 3–1 win over Mendiola 1991, scoring the club's third goal. He remained with the club for the 2022–23 Philippines Football League, claiming 5 goals and 8 assists before renewing his contract with the club for the 2nd half of the season. In March, Cebu and Altınöz qualified for the 2023–24 edition of the AFC Cup.
