= Zach Banzon =

Filipino footballer (born 1996)

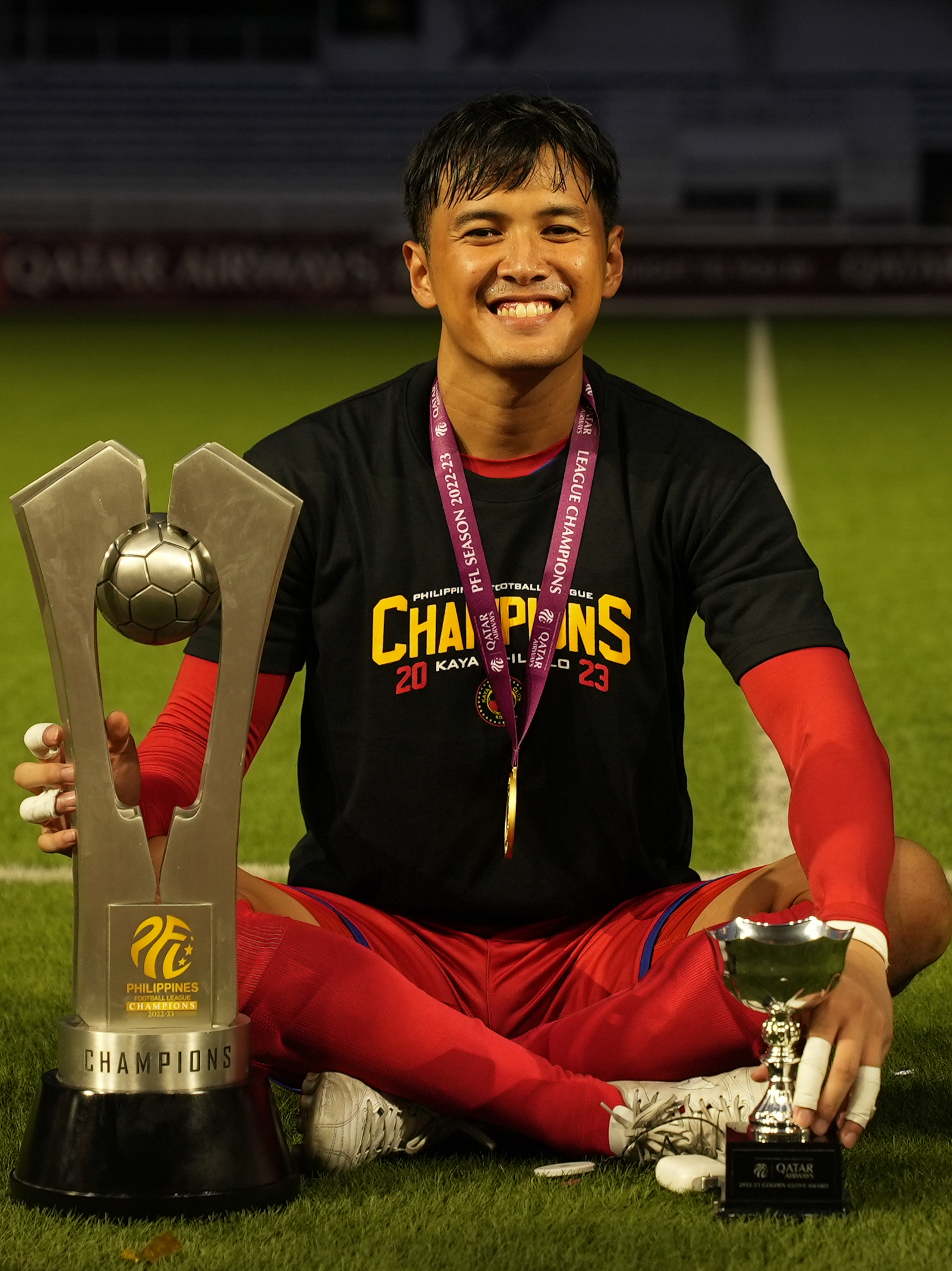
- Banzon in 2025

Personal information
- Full name: Zach Banzon
- Date of birth: 8 October 1996 (age 30)
- Place of birth: Manila, Philippines
- Position: Goalkeeper

Team information
- Current team: Port Talbot Town F.C Reserves

Youth career
- 2015: Kaya FC Academy

Senior career*
Years	Team	Apps	(Gls)
2016–2023	Kaya–Iloilo	24	(0)
2024–	Prague Raptors		
- * Club domestic league appearances and goals as of 22 September 2025

Zach Banzon (born 8 October 1996) is a Filipino former professional footballer who played as a goalkeeper. He spent his entire professional career with Kaya–Iloilo from 2016 until his retirement in 2023.

Banzon's career was highlighted by significant performances in the AFC Champions League in 2021. He culminated his domestic career by winning the Philippines Football League championship with Kaya F.C. in the 2022–23 season. For his performance, he was awarded the Golden Glove as the league's best goalkeeper.

Following his championship season, Banzon announced his retirement from professional football to pursue a Master's degree in Sports Ethics and Integrity in Europe.

== Club career ==
=== Kaya FC-Iloilo (2016–2023) ===
Banzon came through the Kaya FC Academy Elite program before being promoted to the senior team in 2016. Initially a University of the Philippines student studying Psychology with the aim of pursuing Medicine, Banzon graduated Magna Cum Laude while balancing his football career.

Over his career, he became a key figure and often served as vice-captain, taking the captain's armband whenever regular captain Jovin Bedic wasn't on the pitch during his final season. He was positioned behind several established goalkeepers including Matt Acton, Ref Cuaresma, Ace Villanueva, and Mike Casas during his early years.

He had a breakout performance on the continental stage during the 2021 AFC Champions League. After serving as the backup goalkeeper behind Louie Casas for the first three matches, Banzon was given the starting spot for the final three group matches and earned praise for his displays against top Asian clubs, including defending champions Ulsan Hyundai of South Korea and Thailand's BG Pathum United.

The 2022–23 PFL season was the pinnacle of his domestic career. Banzon was instrumental in leading Kaya F.C.–Iloilo to its first Philippines Football League (PFL) title, earning him the PFL Golden Glove award. Banzon announced his retirement from professional football in June 2023, stating "This decision has been difficult because I know there are things I still want to achieve, but it's time for me to step away from football and chase a new dream." This campaign was his final one before focusing on his postgraduate studies.

=== Prague Raptors (2024–present) ===
After retirement from professional football, Banzon joined Prague-based amateur team Prague Raptors in 2024 while pursuing his Master's studies in Europe.

== Post-football career and advocacy ==
After retiring, Banzon enrolled in an Erasmus Mundus Joint Master of Arts program in Sports Ethics and Integrity, inspired by sustainability concerns surrounding the 2022 FIFA World Cup. He aims to help implement sustainable practices in Philippine sports.

Banzon is an ambassador for WePlayGreen, an organization of athletes advocating for climate action, and a project manager for Project Liwanag PH, a non-profit providing solar-powered lighting to indigenous communities. He has also appeared on the BBC World Service podcast The Climate Question to discuss sustainability in sports.

== Honours ==
Kaya F.C.–Iloilo

- Philippines Football League: 2022–23 PFL season

Individual

- PFL Golden Glove: 2022–23
