= Kenshiro Daniels =

Filipino footballer (born 1995)

Personal information
- Full name: Kenshiro Michael Lontok Daniels
- Date of birth: 13 January 1995 (age 31)
- Place of birth: Newport Beach, California, United States
- Height: 1.77 m (5 ft 10 in)
- Position: Forward

Team information
- Current team: Lamphun Warriors
- Number: 9

Youth career
- Irvine Lasers
- Santa Anita SC
- La Sierra High School

Senior career*
Years	Team	Apps	(Gls)
2012	Laos	0	(0)
2013–2018	Kaya–Iloilo	78	(19)
2019–2022	Kaya–Iloilo	18	(4)
2022–2023	United City	14	(5)
2023	Sukhothai	14	(3)
2023–2024	RANS Nusantara	23	(3)
2024	Stallion Laguna	5	(2)
2024–2025	Nakhon Ratchasima	7	(1)
2025	Kaya–Iloilo	7	(1)
2026–	Lamphun Warriors	5	(1)

International career^{‡}
2014	Philippines U22	4	(2)
2014–2023	Philippines	36	(4)
Medal record
Men's football
Representing Philippines
AFC Challenge Cup
Silver medal – second place	2014 Maldives
- * Club domestic league appearances and goals as of 11 April 2026 ‡ National team caps and goals as of 17 October 2023

Kenshiro Michael Lontok Daniels (born January 13, 1995) is a professional footballer who plays as a forward for Thai League 1 club Lamphun Warriors. Born in the United States, he plays for the Philippines national team.

He was born in Newport Beach, California to British actor and retired kickboxer Gary Daniels and a Filipino mother.

== Club career ==
=== Kaya ===
Daniels began his professional career with the Kaya–Iloilo of the United Football League in 2013.

In June 2018, after his 5-year spell, Daniels parted ways with Kaya–Iloilo and moved to the Malaysia Super League, alongside Robert Lopez Mendy, Antonio Ugarte, and Miguel Tanton.

=== Stallion Laguna ===
The signing of Daniels was announced by Stallion's head coach, Ernie Nierras, through a Facebook post.

== International career ==
Daniels was born in Irvine, California to an English father and a Filipino mother, which made him eligible to play for England, the Philippines and the United States.

Daniels made his international debut for the Philippines as a substitute in a 0–0 draw over Malaysia in Selayang, Malaysia on March 1, 2014.

=== International goals ===
Scores and results list the Philippines' goal tally first.

#	Date	Venue	Opponent	Score	Result	Competition
2018
1.	6 October 2018	Sylhet District Stadium, Sylhet, Bangladesh	Bangladesh	1–0	1–0	2018 Bangabandhu Cup
2022
2.	20 December 2022	Morodok Techo National Stadium, Phnom Penh, Cambodia	Cambodia	1–2	2–3	2022 AFF Championship
3.	20 December 2022	Morodok Techo National Stadium, Phnom Penh, Cambodia	Cambodia	2–2	2–3	2022 AFF Championship
4.	23 December 2022	Rizal Memorial Stadium, Manila, Philippines	Brunei	1–0	5–1	2022 AFF Championship

== Personal life ==
Daniels is not of Japanese descent. His given name was derived from Kenshiro, the protagonist of the Fist of the North Star. His father Gary Daniels named him after the character. His father, an actor by profession, portrayed the character in the American film adaptation which premiered in 1995, the year the younger Daniels was born.

== Career statistics ==
=== Club ===
As of 24 December 2022.

Club	Season	League			Cup		Continental		Other		Total	
Club	Season	Division	Apps	Goals	Apps	Goals	Apps	Goals	Apps	Goals	Apps	Goals
Kaya–Iloilo	2017	PFL	21	1	–		–		0	0	21	1
Kaya–Iloilo	2018	PFL	2	1	0	0	–		0	0	2	1
Kaya–Iloilo	2019	PFL	5	2	2	4	–		0	0	7	6
Kaya–Iloilo	2020	PFL	5	2	–		1	0	0	0	6	2
Kaya–Iloilo	2021	PFL	–		4	2	7	0	0	0	11	2
United City	2022–23	PFL	8	6	7	2	6	0	0	0	21	8
Career total			41	12	13	8	14	0	0	0	68	20

== Honors ==
=== International ===
Philippines

- AFC Challenge Cup runner-up: 2014
