= Arda Çınkır =

Turkish footballer (born 2002)

Personal information
- Date of birth: 3 April 2002 (age 24)
- Place of birth: Antakya, Turkey
- Height: 1.87 m (6 ft 2 in)
- Position: Forward

Youth career
- 2013–2014: Hatay Serinyolsport
- 2014–2021: Hatayspor

Senior career*
| Years | Team | Apps | (Gls) |
| 2021–2022 | Hatayspor | | |
| 2022 | Dynamic Herb Cebu | 10 | (8) |
| 2023 | Darıca Gençlerbirliği | | |
| 2023 | Dynamic Herb Cebu | | |
- * Club domestic league appearances and goals

Arda Çınkır (born 3 April 2002) is a Turkish professional footballer who plays as a forward.

== Personal life ==
Çınkır was born in Antakya in the province of Hatay. He also likes playing table tennis and volleyball, which his father played professionally.

== Club career ==
=== Youth ===
Çınkır played for the youth football program of Hatay, before joining the youth team of Süper Lig club Hatayspor in 2014. He played with the club's U19 team for several years.

=== Hatayspor ===
After playing with the youth teams of the club, Çınkır was promoted to the Hatayspor senior team in 2020, although he didn't play a single professional appearance for the club.

=== Dynamic Herb Cebu ===
In March 2022, it was announced that Çınkır, along with fellow Hatayspor players Mert Altınöz and Nazım Özcan, would be playing for PFL side Dynamic Herb Cebu in the Copa Paulino Alcantara and Philippines Football League as a result of club owner Ugur Tasci's partnership with Hatayspor.

Çınkır made his first appearance for the club in a 2–0 win over Stallion Laguna, scoring his first and second goals for the club in their second match, a 3–1 win over Mendiola 1991. Cebu ended up finishing fourth. Çınkır would resign with Cebu for the club's upcoming PFL season, eventually becoming the league's second top scorer with 8 goals by the time the league entered the winter break.

=== Darıca Gençlerbirliği ===
In January 2023, after almost a year with Cebu, Çınkır announced his departure from the club, signing for Turkish side Darıca Gençlerbirliği. He remained mostly on the bench, making only one substitute appearance in the club's 1–0 win over Bulvarspor. His contract with the club ended in August.

=== Return to Cebu ===
In mid-August 2023, Cebu had announced that they had re-signed Çınkır as a foreign reinforcement, along with a host of other players as the club began preparations for its participation the 2023–24 edition of the AFC Cup.
