= Quincy Kammeraad =

Filipino footballer (born 2001)

Personal information
- Full name: Quincy Julian Boltron Kammeraad
- Date of birth: 1 February 2001 (age 25)
- Place of birth: Haarlem, Netherlands
- Height: 1.85 m (6 ft 1 in)
- Position: Goalkeeper

Team information
- Current team: Kuala Lumpur City
- Number: 1

Youth career
- Zeeburgia
- AZ
- FC Volendam
- Zeeburgia

Senior career*
Years	Team	Apps	(Gls)
2017	Global	0	(0)
2020–2022	Azkals Development Team	6	(0)
2022–2023	Kaya–Iloilo	6	(0)
2024–2025	One Taguig	26	(0)
2025–	Kuala Lumpur City	24	(0)

International career^{‡}
2017–2018	Philippines U19	5	(0)
2021–2023	Philippines U23	11	(0)
2024–	Philippines	6	(0)
- * Club domestic league appearances and goals as of 21 August 2026 ‡ National team caps and goals as of 21 August 2026

Quincy Julian Boltron Kammeraad (born 1 February 2001) is a professional footballer who plays as a goalkeeper for Malaysia Super League club Kuala Lumpur City. Born in the Netherlands, he plays for the Philippines national team.

== Early life ==
Kammeraad was born in the Haarlem, Netherlands to a Filipino mother and Dutch father. He was born to a football family with his father and brother being into the sport. He played football leisurely until age ten when he began garnering interest from local football clubs.

== Club career ==
=== Global ===
Kammeraad started his career with Filipino side Global after playing for the youth academy of Zeeburgia in the Dutch lower leagues. He left after six months due to homesickness and a lack of payment. He was also not registered and thus ineligible to play. before returning to the youth academy of Zeeburgia.

=== Azkals Development Team ===
On 29 January 2020, Kammeraad signed a two-year contract for the Filipino club Azkals Development Team. He make his debut for the club in a 1–0 lost to United City on 28 October.

=== Kaya–Iloilo ===
After a two-year stint with the Azkals Development Team, it was announced that Kammeraad joined Kaya–Iloilo on 21 June 2022 ahead of their 2022 AFC Cup campaign. He make his debut for the club on 24 June in a 2–1 lost to Cambodian club Visakha.

In Kammeraad second season at the club, he was exposed to playing in the 2023–24 AFC Champions League group stage where he make his debut on 19 September 2023 in a 1–3 lost to Chinese club Shandong Taishan. Kammeraad also helped the club to win the 2023 Copa Paulino Alcantara.

=== One Taguig ===
In January 2024, Kammeraad signed with Filipino club One Taguig. He made his debut for the club on 7 April in a 4–1 win over Manila Montet.

=== Kuala Lumpur City ===
On 3 July 2025, Kammeraad signed with Malaysia Super League club Kuala Lumpur City.

== International career ==
=== Philippines U19 ===
In October 2017, Kammeraad was called up to the Philippines U19 for the 2018 AFC U-19 Championship qualification matches against Myanmar U19, China U19, and Cambodia U19.

=== Philippines U23 ===
In October 2021, Kammeraad was called up to the Philippines U23 for the 2022 AFC U-23 Asian Cup qualification matches against South Korea U23, Singapore U23, and Timor-Leste U23. He made his debut in a 3–0 defeat against South Korea U23

Kammeraad was included in the 20-man squad for 31st Southeast Asian Games, which was held in Vietnam.

=== Philippines ===
In December 2021, Kammeraad was named in the Philippines 23-man squad for the 2020 AFF Championship held in Singapore.

Kammeraad made his debut for the senior team when he replaced starting keeper Patrick Deyto early on in their match against Indonesia in the 2024 ASEAN Championship; they won 1–0, earning them a spot in the semi-finals. He was named the 'Man of the Match'.

On 20 July 2026, Kammeraad was named in the final roster for the 2026 ASEAN Championship. He was the starting keeper for the national team's first two group stage matches against Myanmar and Laos, before being replaced by Patrick Deyto in the next match.

== Honours ==
Kaya–Iloilo

- Philippines Football League: 2022–23
- Copa Paulino Alcantara: 2023
