= Maharlika F.C. =

Filipino association football club based in Taguig

Maharlika
- Full name: Maharlika Football Club
- Nicknames: Koponan ng Masa (Team of the Masses)
- Short name: MAH
- Founded: 2020; 6 years ago
- Ground: McKinley Hill Stadium
- Capacity: 2,000
- Owner: M1 International Limited
- Chairman: Teddy Tsai
- CEO: Denis Lucindo
- Coach: Moon Hong
- League: Philippines Football League
- 2025–26: Philippines Football League, 7th of 15
- Website: maharlikafc.com
Home colours	Away colours

Maharlika Football Club, commonly referred to as Maharlika, is a Philippine professional football club that competes in the Philippines Football League.

The club was founded in 2019 as an all-star seven-a-side team that competed in the 7's Football League. The professional team was formed in 2020 amid the COVID-19 pandemic. The club was co-founded by former Philippines national team defender Anton del Rosario.

== History ==
=== Seven-a-side team (2019) ===
Former Philippine national team defender Anton del Rosario announced that to open his 7's Football League's 2019 season, the league was launching a new competition called the Kampeon Cup 2019. The competition was held from July 27 to 28 at the McKinley Hill Stadium in Taguig, and featured all-star 7-a-side squads from Manila, Bacolod, Cebu City, and Davao City. The team based in Manila was Maharlika F.C.

Several Philippines Football League (PFL) standouts played for the club during the Kampeon Cup, including former Ilocos United goalkeeper Cedric Hodreal, former Kaya and Philippine national team defender Aly Borromeo, Mendiola midfielders Hamed Hajimehdi and Roberto Corsame Jr., and Philippine Air Force stalwart Alexandro Elnar. The team had noted Philippine celebrities in its squad such as Nico Bolzico, husband of actress Solenn Heussaff, and Brazilian-Japanese model Daniel Matsunaga.

During the Kampeon 7s Cup in 2019, Maharlika faced all-star clubs from around the Philippines and finished second out of four clubs in the group stage. In the final, it lost 5–3 to the Cebu all-star team, Cebu Leylam FC, with Hajimehdji, Del Rosario, and Borromeo scoring the goals. The team was also planned to join the Kampeon 7s Cup 2020 in Cebu featuring clubs from Davao, Bacolod, Cebu, and Iloilo City from March 13 to 15, However, due to the COVID-19 Pandemic, the competition was cancelled.

=== Philippines Football League (2020–) ===
On July 27, the Facebook and Instagram pages of Maharlika were created, leading to exciting new rumours of the formation of a new club. The club began engaging its fans by asking them questions regarding topics such as player signings and sustainability. On July 30, the club opened its doors to training via Zoom. Pictures of these training sessions were later posted, revealing Del Rosario alongside a set of younger football players as well as many former United Football League and Philippines Football League veterans such as former Kaya-Iloilo players Serge Kaole and Alfred Osei, Hodreal, who played for Maharlika in the Kampeon 7s Cup, former Manila Nomads Sports Club player Mateo Yuhico, and former Global keeper Enrique Ortiz.

The starting lineup that garnered Maharlika's first-ever win over Stallion Laguna.

On August 6, during a livestream on the Facebook page of Sports On Air, Del Rosario revealed that Maharlika was applying for a license to be able to join the PFL as early as the 2020 season. Should they not participate in this year's season, they were open to join the 2020 season of the Weekend Futbol League. He also stated that he doesn't want to commit just yet, given the COVID-19 pandemic in the Philippines. The team's lineup wasn't revealed either, but it is hinted by Del Rosario to contain former Azkals players, former football players, and some youth players. Brazilian-Japanese model Daniel Matsunaga is one of those who is part of the lineup. On August 9, Misagh Bahadoran hinted that he had joined Maharlika Football Club, stating that the club had the mentality of former Azkals' players.

On September 1, Maharlika was granted a provisional license allowing it to participate in the PFL's 2020 season. For at least the first season, players were signed to play for a wage of ₱1, essentially pro bono, until the club becomes more sustainable. On September 22, 2020, Maharlika formally partnered with the Manila city government and were formally endorsed by Mayor Isko Moreno.

Maharlika's first-ever PFL match took place on October 28 at the PFF National Training Centre, where they lost 1–0 to Kaya–Iloilo. On their following match, on October 31, Maharlika scored their first-ever PFL goal, with Jose Montelibano scoring against Stallion Laguna. That same match was also their first-ever PFL win, which ended 2–1 courtesy of winger Jeremy Theuer.

In February 2023, the McKinley Hill Stadium in Taguig was approved by the PFL as the club's home stadium. The club then renamed themselves as Maharlika Taguig in January 2024, before the start of the 2024 Philippines Football League.

F.C. Vikings, a team which has played in the Taiwan Football Premier League, fully acquired the Filipino club by January 2025 taking over the ownership from Anton del Rosario while remaining in the PFL. The club was renamed once more to Maharlika F.C. At th end of the 2024–25 season, however, the club almost disbanded following the death of Vikings team leader Ryan Chen. Taiwan-based Company M1 International Limited fully acquired the rights to Maharlika, with chairman Teddy Tsai and Denis Lucindo taking over the team at the start of the 2025-26 season.

== Team image ==
Maharlika Taguig markets itself as the "Koponan ng Masa" and adopts the motto of "For the people, by the people, we are the People's Club". The club's crest was designed by Augustino Cabral of Southside Football with its own nickname featured at the bottom using the traditional Baybayin script. The club is named after a feudal warrior class of the ancient Tagalog society in Luzon during the pre-colonial era.

=== Kit manufacturers and sponsors ===
Period	Kit Manufacturer	Shirt Partner
2020–2021	Gameville Sportswear	Philam Life
2022–	Equipt Studios	AIA

== Affiliated clubs ==
- (Philippines) EMA Bulacan Highlanders (2024)
- (Chinese Taipei) Vikings (2025) – owners for 2024-25 season.

In May 2024, the club officially announced their partnership with amateur club EMA Bulacan Highlanders with the aim to improve grassroots and youth development football in Bulacan.

== Players ==
As of 28 August 2026

Note: Flags indicate national team as defined under FIFA eligibility rules; some limited exceptions apply. Players may hold more than one non-FIFA nationality.

No.	Pos.	Nation	Player
1	GK	USA	Adam Braman
2	DF	PHI	Giap Bongolan
3	DF	PHI	Bryan Palpal-Latoc
5	DF	PHI	Enzo Lucindo
6	MF	KOR	Park Jae-hyun
7	FW	KOR	Jo Woo-hyuk
8	MF	PHI	Nathan Rilloraza
9	FW	JPN	Ren Nagamatsu
10	MF	PHI	Jorrel Aristorenas (Captain)
11	FW	COL	Cristian Molina Escobar
15	MF	JPN	Hayato Kame
17	FW	PHI	Ivan Ouano
19	FW	TTO	Michael Kedman
20	DF	PHI	Dean Ebarle (co-captain)

No.	Pos.	Nation	Player
22	GK	PHI	Kenry Balobo (co-captain)
23	MF	PHI	Charlie Beaton
24	FW	PHI	Kintaro Miyagi
25	MF	GHA	Daniel Oppong
27	DF	PHI	OJ Clarino
29	FW	KOR	Ji Eon-hak
30	DF	PHI	Roberto Corsame
39	MF	PHI	Paolo Bugas
44	DF	PHI	Michael Menzi (co-captain)
71	FW	JPN	Kira Yamamoto
88	GK	PHI	Shane Salino
94	MF	POR	Anderson Pinto
99	DF	KOR	Park Eun-soo

== Coaching staff ==
As of July 30, 2021

Position	Staff
General manager	(Philippines) Choy Calunsod
Head coach	(South Korea) Moon Hong
Assistant head coaches	(Philippines) Alvin Ocampo
Assistant head coaches	(Philippines) Adrian Payson
Strength and conditioning coach	(Philippines) Cris Roldan
Physical therapist	(Philippines) Lorenzo Simbulan

=== Head coaches ===
Dates	Name	Notes
2020	(Philippines) Roxy Dorlas	
2021	(Philippines) Arvin Jay Soliman	
2022	(South Korea) Derick Jeongil Kim	
2022	(Philippines) Arman Esteban	
2023	(Philippines) Roxy Dorlas	
2024	(Nigeria) Lerche Njang	
2024–2025	(Romania) Marian Mihail	
2025	(South Korea) Jung Donggyu	
2025–	(South Korea) Moon Hong	

== Records ==
Season	Division	Teams	League position	Copa Paulino Alcantara	AFC Champions League	AFC Cup
2020	1	6	5th	Canceled	—	—
2021	1	7	Canceled	Did not participate	—	—
2022	—	—	—	6th	—	—
2022–23	1	5	5th	Quarter-final	—	—
2024	1	15	9th	—	—	—
2024–25	1	10	7th	—	—	—
Updated as of May 6, 2025
