= Alan Robertson (South African soccer) =

South African soccer player (born 1994)

Personal information
- Date of birth: 17 February 1994 (age 32)
- Place of birth: South Africa
- Height: 1.89 m (6 ft 2 in)
- Position: Defender

Youth career
- 2012–2013: Barnet

Senior career*
Years	Team	Apps	(Gls)
2013–2015	University of Pretoria	1	(0)
2015–2017	AmaZulu	17	(0)
2017–2022	Stellenbosch	98	(3)
2022–2023	United City	24	(3)
2023–2024	Kedah	0	(0)
- * Club domestic league appearances and goals as of 4 January 2023

Alan Robertson (born 17 February 1994) is a South African professional soccer player who plays as a defender.
