= Mike Ott =

Filipino footballer (born 1995)

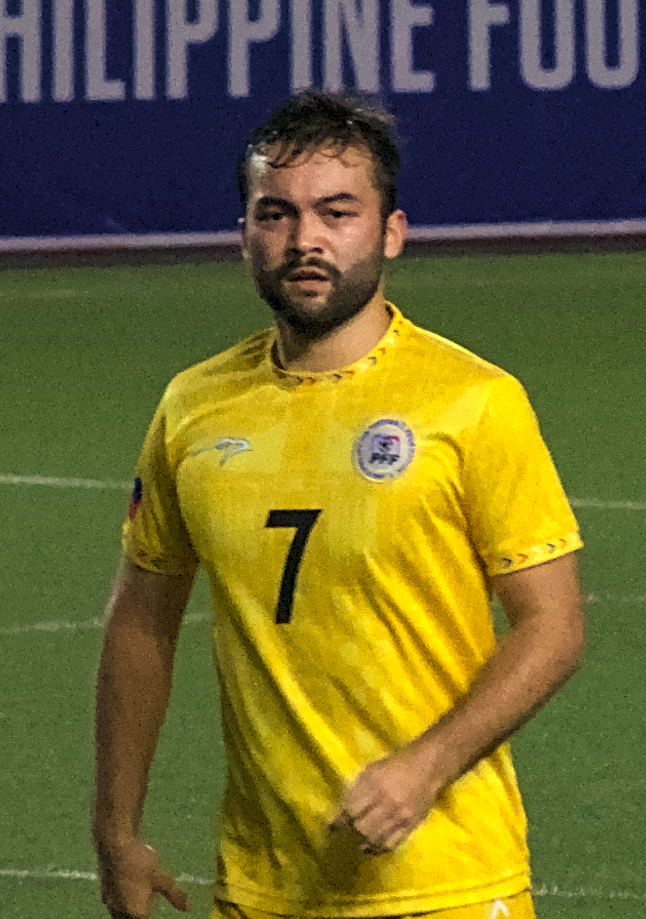
- Ott playing for Philippines in 2023

Personal information
- Full name: Mike Rigoberto Ott (Note: Mike Ott was born in Germany. Thus, he does not possess his mother's maiden name which is Gelito.)
- Date of birth: 2 March 1995 (age 31)
- Place of birth: Munich, Germany
- Height: 1.66 m (5 ft 5 in)
- Position: Attacking midfielder

Team information
- Current team: Visakha
- Number: 6

Youth career
- 2002–2003: FSV Ilmmünster
- 2003–2005: FSV Pfaffenhofen
- 2005–2014: 1860 Munich

Senior career*
Years	Team	Apps	(Gls)
2012–2014	1860 Munich II	25	(12)
2014–2015	1. FC Nürnberg	0	(0)
2014–2017	1. FC Nürnberg II	52	(8)
2017–2018	Angthong	30	(7)
2018–2022	United City	54	(35)
2022–2024	Barito Putera	60	(10)
2024–2025	Visakha	29	(7)
2025–	Kaya–Iloilo	15	(11)

International career^{‡}
2016–	Philippines	40	(5)
- * Club domestic league appearances and goals as of 11 March 2026 ‡ National team caps and goals as of 22:00; 21 March 2024 (UTC)

Mike Rigoberto Ott (born 2 March 1995) is a professional footballer who plays as an attacking midfielder for Philippines Football League club Kaya–Iloilo. Born in Germany, he plays for the Philippines national team.

== Personal life ==
Mike is the younger brother of Manuel Ott who is also an international footballer for the Philippines and also has a twin brother named Marco. Their father is German and their mother is Filipina who is a native of Boracay in Malay, Aklan.

== Club career ==
=== 1860 Munich II ===
Born in Munich, Ott had his youth career at TSV 1860 Munich. On 17 November 2012, he made his debut for the club's reserves in a 2–0 home defeat against Eintracht Bamberg. He scored 12 goals in 25 games for Munich II before joining 1. FC Nürnberg.

=== 1. FC Nürnberg ===
In April 2014, Ott signed a three-year deal with 1. FC Nürnberg. After failing to impress at the senior squad, Ott was demoted to Nürnberg's second team. In the second team, he played 52 matches and has 8 goals, 10 assists.

=== Angthong ===
On 25 January 2017, Angthong F.C. of Thai League 2 announced that they have signed Ott.

=== Ceres-Negros and United City ===
In 2018, Ott joined Philippines Football League club Ceres-Negros. He reunited with his brother Manuel who is also a player of Ceres-Negros. In mid-2020, Ceres–Negros became United City, after undergoing a management change in mid-2020 amidst the COVID-19 pandemic. Ott and his brother were re-signed by the club's new owners.

=== PS Barito Putera ===
On 4 August 2022, Ott decided to go to Indonesia and signed a contract with Liga 1 club PS Barito Putera. He made his club debut on 13 August, coming on as a starter in a 1–0 lose against PSS Sleman. Ott assisted a goal by Kahar Kalu Muzakkar in Barito's 5–2 lose against Persib Bandung on 16 September.

On 10 January 2023, Ott scored his first league goal and saved his team from defeat in a 1–1 draw with PSM Makassar. On 14 February, Ott scored a brace for the club in a 4–1 home win against RANS Nusantara. On 21 March, Ott scored an equalizer against Persis Solo, although the team went on to lose 2-3 anyways.

== International career ==
In June 2013, Ott was called up for the Philippines national team by German coach Michael Weiss for an international friendly against Hong Kong but did not take part. In late September 2016, he was called up by American coach Thomas Dooley for the October international friendly matches against Bahrain and North Korea as part of their preparation for the 2016 AFF Championship.

He made his debut against Bahrain, coming on as a half-time substitute for Kevin Ingreso and scored the Philippines' only goal within five minutes as they lost 3–1.

=== International goals ===
Scores and results list the Philippines' goal tally first, score column indicates score after each Ott goal.

List of international goals scored by Mike Ott
No.	Date	Venue	Opponent	Score	Result	Competition
1	6 October 2016	Rizal Memorial Stadium, Manila, Philippines	Bahrain	1–2	1–3	Friendly
2	10 October 2017	Saoud bin Abdulrahman Stadium, Al Wakrah, Qatar	Yemen	1–1	1–1	2019 AFC Asian Cup qualification
3	5 September 2019	Panaad Stadium, Bacolod, Philippines	Syria	2–4	2–5	2022 FIFA World Cup qualification
4	16 July 2022	Kapten I Wayan Dipta Stadium, Bali, Indonesia	Timor-Leste	1–0	4–1	Friendly
5	19 June 2023	Rizal Memorial Stadium, Manila, Philippines	Chinese Taipei	1–1	2–3	Friendly
