= Robert Lopez Mendy =

Senegalese footballer

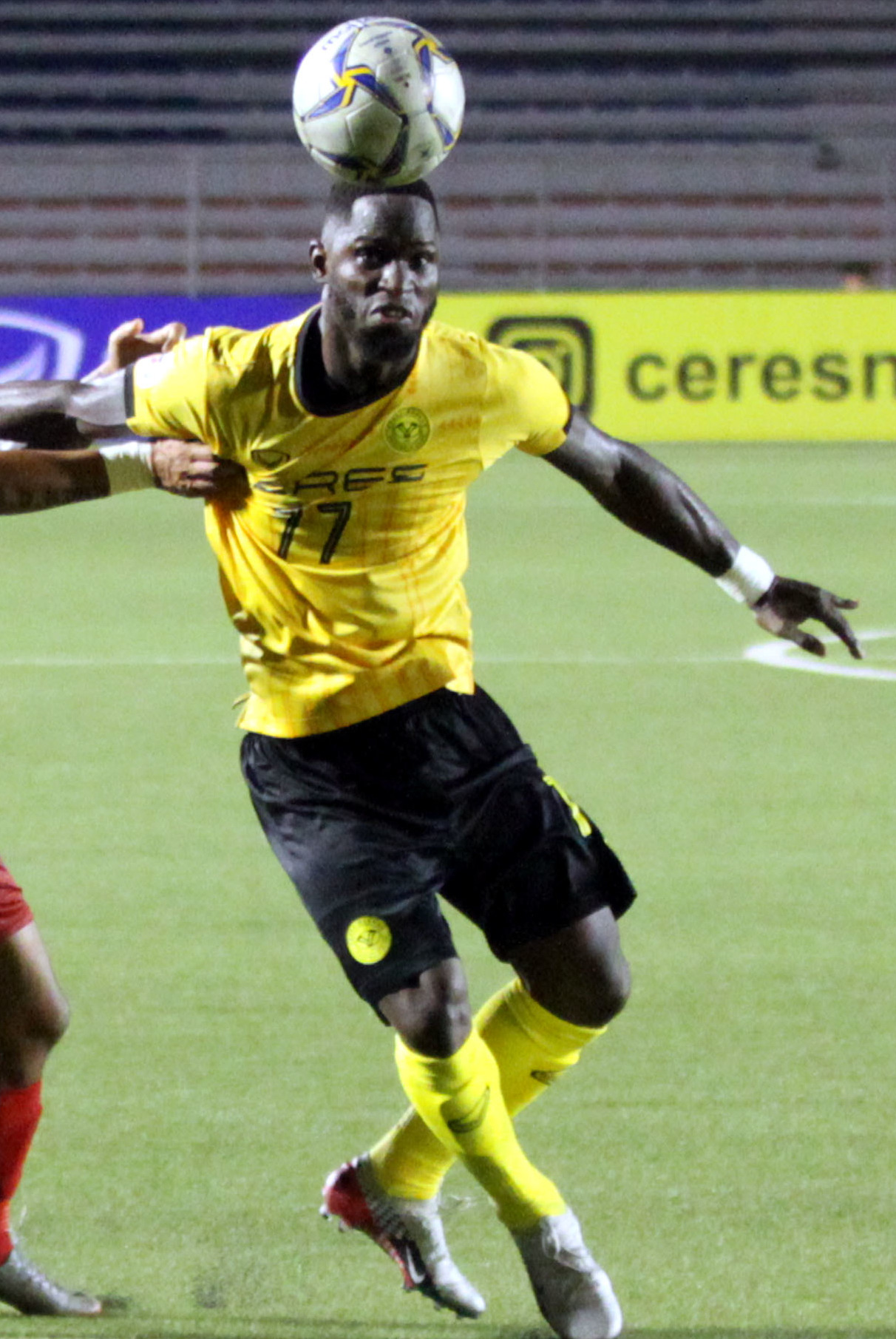
- Lopez Mendy in 2020

Personal information
- Full name: Robert Waly Lopez Mendy
- Date of birth: 23 February 1987 (age 39)
- Place of birth: Dakar, Senegal
- Height: 1.78 m (5 ft 10 in)
- Position: Forward

Team information
- Current team: Davao Aguilas F.C.

Senior career*
Years	Team	Apps	(Gls)
2013–2015	Green Archers United		(26)
2016–2018	Kaya–Iloilo	45 (Note: Counted from season 2017 onwards)	(45 (Note: Counted from season 2016 onwards))
2019	UiTM	11	(7)
2019–2020	Ceres–Negros / United City	19	(22)
2021–2022	PKR Svay Rieng	19	(7)
2022–2024	Kaya–Iloilo		
- * Club domestic league appearances and goals

Robert Waly Lopez Mendy (born 23 February 1987) is a Senegalese professional footballer who plays as a Forward.

== Club career ==
=== Green Archers United ===
Lopez Mendy moved to the Philippines in August 2013 to play in the United Football League (UFL). He joined Green Archers United and scored the last goal in the team's 5–0 victory over Philippine Navy in the 2013 UFL Cup group stage. Green Archers finished third in the tournament.

In the 2014 league season, Lopez Mendy played as a midfielder. On 23 January, on an assist provided by Chieffy Caligdong, he scored the second goal in a 2–2 draw with Philippine Army. He then scored on the fourth minute in an eventual 4–1 loss to Stallion on 25 February. On 22 March, he scored the Archers' first goal in a 2–1 comeback win against Loyola Meralco Sparks. In the next match, on 27 March, he scored a brace in the 2–1 victory over Team Socceroo, with the second goal scored in the 89th minute. He then scored a consolation goal in another 4–1 loss to Stallion on 10 April. He then scored a brace and registered an assist in the following match, a 4–2 win over Philippine Army. On 29 April, he scored a brace in a 2–1 win over Pasargad, with the first goal scored on the 8th minute. On 3 May, he converted the penalty to equalize 1–1 with Loyola Meralco Sparks. A month later, on 3 June, he scored a brace in the 2–0 win over Kaya. He netted another brace in the first half of their 3–0 win over Philippine Army on 19 June, their second to the last match of the season. Lopez Mendy ended the season with 15 goals.

During the first UFL All-Star Weekend held on 25 April 2015, Lopez Mendy played in the Philippines vs the Rest of the World exhibition game. He was named man of the match for scoring a hat-trick in the second half as the foreigners won 5–4.

In the 2015 UFL Cup group stage, Lopez Mendy scored a brace within 6 minutes of game time as the Archers defeated Pasargad 6–0 on 10 May. In their last group match against Ceres, he scored in the 3rd minute of an eventual 4–1 defeat. GAU were later eliminated in the quarter-finals.

=== Kaya ===
Lopez Mendy was signed by Kaya for their 2016 season. He scored a total of 11 goals in the 2016 UFL Cup, making him the tournament's top scorer as Kaya finished third. He found the net a lot that season, including a brace to help Kaya beat his former club Green Archers United 5-1. However, the Senegalese striker was sent off despite scoring Kaya's only goal to help beat Loyola Meralco 1-0, his only red card that season. Lopez Mendy was still part of Kaya for the maiden season of the incipient Philippines Football League (PFL) in 2017. For the 2018 season, Lopez Mendy was named Player of the Season by Kaya's fan club.

=== UiTM ===
In January 2019 it was reported that Lopez Mendy has joined UiTM F.C. of the second-tier league Malaysia Premier League.

=== Ceres–Negros / United City ===
Lopez Mendy returned to the Philippines to sign up to play for Ceres Negros of the PFL in August 2019. At the 2019 Copa Paulino Alcantara, in which his club Ceres Negros won the title, Lopez Mendy won the Golden Boot individual award for scoring five goals in the whole tournament.

When Ceres Negros had a management overhaul in July 2020 and was renamed as United City, the new management re-signed Lopez Mendy to play for the club. After the conclusion of the 2020 season, United City in February 2021 announced the departure of Lopez Mendy from the club to play for a Cambodian club.

== Personal life ==
Robert Waly Lopez Mendy was born on 23 February 1987 in Dakar, Senegal. He earned a college degree in French language and literature from College Sacre Coeur in Dakar.

In 2016, he married his Filipina wife, Maebel "Ameera" Ybera Lacastesantos; the couple have a son.

On 3 March 2020, a Senate bill was passed by Senator Migz Zubiri to grant Filipino citizenship to Lopez Mendy through naturalization. It can make him eligible to play for the Philippines national team.

== Honours ==
=== Club ===
Green Archers United

- United Football League Cup third place: 2013

Kaya–Iloilo

- Philippines Football League: 2022–23, 2024
- Copa Paulino Alcantara: 2018
- United Football League Cup third place: 2016

Ceres–Negros / United City

- Philippines Football League: 2019, 2020
- Copa Paulino Alcantara: 2019

=== Individual ===
- Copa Paulino Alcantara Golden Boot: 2019
- United Football League Cup top scorer: 2016
