= Carlyle Mitchell =

Trinidadian international footballer

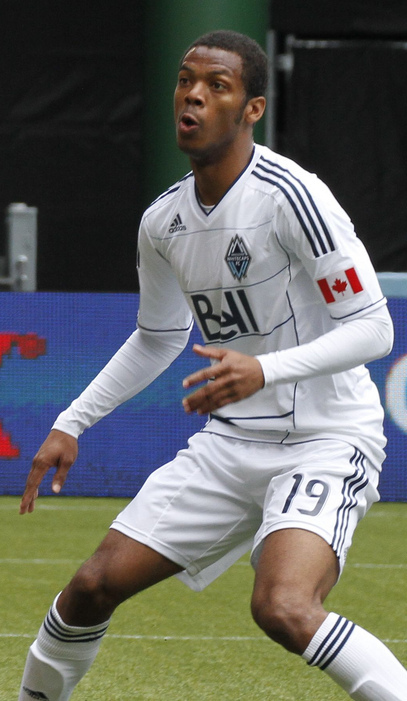
- Mitchell with Vancouver Whitecaps in 2012

Personal information
- Full name: Carlyle Deon Mitchell
- Date of birth: 8 August 1987 (age 39)
- Place of birth: Arima, Trinidad and Tobago
- Position: Centre back

Senior career*
Years	Team	Apps	(Gls)
2008–2011	Joe Public		
2011–2014	Vancouver Whitecaps FC	28	(1)
2013	→ FC Edmonton (loan)	7	(0)
2015–2016	Seoul E-Land	56	(7)
2017	San Juan Jabloteh		
2017–2018	East Bengal		
2018	Central FC	0	(0)
2018	Indy Eleven	31	(2)
2019–2020	St. Ann's Rangers		
2020–2023	Kaya–Iloilo		
2023–2025	Morvant Caledonia		

International career
2010–2019	Trinidad and Tobago	39	(3)
- * Club domestic league appearances and goals

Carlyle Deon Mitchell (born 8 August 1987) is a Trinidadian former international footballer who played as a centre back for the Trinidad and Tobago national football team.

== Club career ==
Mitchell was born in Arima and educated at Hillview College, where he represented the school in the Secondary Schools Football League. He began his career in the TT Pro League with Joe Public in 2008.

He signed with Vancouver Whitecaps FC of Major League Soccer on 15 September 2011, making his debut for the club on 6 October 2011. Mitchell was loaned to NASL club FC Edmonton on 11 March 2013. He was released by the Whitecaps on 14 November 2014 after their 2014 season ended.

He signed for South Korean club Seoul E-Land in December 2014, for the 2015 season.

In July 2017, he signed for Indian I-League club East Bengal after a brief spell with San Juan Jabloteh, and appeared in the Calcutta Football League.

In early February 2018, Mitchell joined Central FC. However, he left shortly after and signed with Indy Eleven on 12 February 2018, alongside Central teammate Nathan Lewis.

Mitchell moved to the Philippines in early 2020, to join Kaya–Iloilo of the Philippines Football League.

Mitchell joined Morvant Caledonia United in 2023, and played with them across three seasons, retiring after his last match on 2 June 2025.

== International career ==
Mitchell made his international debut for Trinidad and Tobago in 2010. He scored his first goal for the national side in a 2018 FIFA World Cup Qualification 3–1 loss to Honduras on 15 November 2016.

=== International goals ===
Scores and results list Trinidad and Tobago's goal tally first.

Goal	Date	Venue	Opponent	Score	Result	Competition
1.	15 November 2016	Estadio Olímpico Metropolitano, San Pedro Sula, Honduras	Honduras	1–2	1–3	2018 FIFA World Cup qualification
2.	30 December 2016	Nicaragua National Football Stadium, Managua, Nicaragua	Nicaragua	2–1	3–1	Friendly
3.	27 July 2017	Estadio George Capwell, Guayaquil, Ecuador	Ecuador	1–1	1–3	Friendly
