= 2024 Kaya F.C.–Iloilo season =

Kaya–Iloilo
2024 season
- Owner: Santi Araneta
- Head Coach: Yu Hoshide
- Stadium: Campo Alcantara Stadium
- Philippines Football League: Champions
- All statistics correct as of March 10, 2024.

The 2024 season was Kaya F.C.–Iloilo's 6th season in both the Philippines Football League and Copa Paulino Alcantara, having won both in the previous season. The club will also compete in AFC competitions after winning the 2023 Copa Paulino Alcantara.

The previous season saw the club complete a historic title sweep across all competitions, winning the PFL, Copa, PFF Women's League, and PFF National U19 Championship. Then-manager Colum Curtis left the club at the end of 2023 after his contract expired, with assistant coach Yu Hoshide taking over for the season. The club saw a considerable player overhaul with the club attempting to form a new core. Veterans Arnel Amita and Eric Giganto left, as well as star player Daizo Horikoshi. A host of midseason signings also departed the club - Ricardo Sendra and Curt Dizon went to United City, Abou Sy went to Dynamic Herb Cebu, and Quincy Kammeraad went to newcomers Taguig. The club signed Shuto Komaki and Kaishu Yamazaki formerly of the Singapore Premier League, Eric Esso from Hearts of Oak, as well as the signing of former Pachanga Diliman defender Park Yi-young who had recently been let go from 2. Bundesliga side FC St. Pauli.

== Squad ==
As of 13 July 2024

Squad No.	Name	Nationality	Date of birth (age)	Previous club
Goalkeepers
1	Walid Birrou	(Spain)	6 September 1995 (age 30)	(Gibraltar) Glacis United
2	Kenry Balobo	(Philippines)	22 September 1998 (age 27)	(Philippines) United City
16	Nathan Bata	(Philippines)	24 January 2005 (age 20)	(Philippines) Kaya FC Academy
Defenders
3	Akito Saito	(Japan)	15 August 1999 (age 26)	(India) Aizawl
12	Mar Diano	(Philippines)	24 July 1997 (age 28)	(Philippines) Azkals Development Team
15	Marco Casambre	(Philippines)	18 December 1998 (age 27)	(Thailand) Sukhothai
20	Park Yi-young	(South Korea)	29 June 1994 (age 31)	(Germany) St. Pauli II
23	Simone Rota	(Philippines) (Italy)	6 November 1984 (age 41)	(Philippines) Davao Aguilas
44	Audie Menzi	(Philippines)	11 October 1994 (age 31)	(Philippines) Kaya FC Academy
Midfielders
6	Mark Swainston	(Philippines) (England)	13 November 1999 (age 26)	(Hong Kong) Eastern
8	Marwin Angeles	(Philippines) (Italy)	9 January 1991 (age 35)	(Indonesia) Persik Kediri
22	Fitch Arboleda	(Philippines)	4 January 1993 (age 33)	(Philippines) Stallion Laguna
25	Eric Esso	(Ghana)	21 June 1994 (age 31)	(Ghana) Hearts of Oak
26	Bandiougou Konate	(Mali)	2 March 2003 (age 22)	(Philippines) Blue Guards
33	Julian Romero	(Philippines)	13 February 2004 (age 21)	(Philippines) Kaya FC Academy
77	Martini Rey	(Philippines)	13 June 1999 (age 26)	(Philippines) Far Eastern University
88	Kaishu Yamazaki	(Japan)	12 July 1997 (age 28)	(Indonesia) Persikabo 1973
Forwards
7	Jovin Bedic	(Philippines)	8 July 1990 (age 35)	(Philippines) Stallion Laguna
9	Lee Do-kyung	(South Korea)	17 February 2003 (age 22)	(South Korea) Yangcheon TNT
13	Jesus Melliza	(Philippines)	20 April 1992 (age 33)	(Philippines) Stallion Laguna
14	Shuto Komaki	(Japan)	30 May 2000 (age 25)	(Japan) Albirex Niigata (S)
17	Robert Lopez Mendy	(Senegal)	23 February 1987 (age 38)	(Cambodia) Svay Rieng
24	Sherwin Basindanan	(Philippines)	—	(Philippines) Far Eastern University

== Transfers ==
Note: Flags indicate national team as defined under FIFA eligibility rules. Players may hold more than one non-FIFA nationality.

=== In ===
Date	Pos.	Nat.	Name	From	Ref.
Pre-season
February 9	FW	(Japan)	Shuto Komaki	(Japan) Albirex Niigata (S)	
February 10	MF	(Ghana)	Eric Esso	(Ghana) Hearts of Oak	
February 11	MF	(Japan)	Kaishu Yamazaki	(Indonesia) Persikabo 1973	
February 17	DF	(South Korea)	Park Yi-young	(Germany) St. Pauli II	
March 9	MF	(Mali)	Bandiougou Konate	(Philippines) Blue Guards	
March 10	GK	(Spain)	Walid Birrou	(Gibraltar) Glacis United	
April 1	FW	(South Korea)	Lee Do-kyung	(South Korea) Yangcheon TNT	

=== Out ===
Date	Pos.	Nat.	Name	To	Ref.
Pre-season
January 12	FW	(Japan)	Daizo Horikoshi	(Thailand) Trat	
January 20	GK	(Cameroon)	Henri Bandeken	(Philippines) United City	
January 21	MF	(Philippines)	Justin Baas	(Thailand) Uthai Thani	
January 26	FW	(Senegal)	Abou Sy	(Philippines) Dynamic Herb Cebu	
January 27	MF	(Argentina)	Ricardo Sendra	(Philippines) United City	
January 29	MF	(Philippines)	Arnel Amita	(Philippines) One Taguig	
January 30	FW	(Philippines)	Eric Giganto	(Philippines) Manila Digger	
January 31	FW	(Philippines)	Curt Dizon	(Philippines) United City	
January 31	GK	(Philippines)	Quincy Kammeraad	(Philippines) One Taguig	
July 11	FW	(Philippines)	Jarvey Gayoso	(Cambodia) Phnom Penh Crown	

== Preseason and friendlies ==
Win Draw Loss

=== Friendlies ===
February 24, 2024 Friendly	Kaya–Iloilo	2–1	Manila Digger	Makati
	Lopez Mendy; Esso		Jatta	Stadium: University of Makati Stadium

March 9, 2024 Friendly	Loyola	0–3	Kaya–Iloilo	Manila
				Stadium: Rizal Memorial Stadium

March 13, 2024 Friendly	Stallion Laguna	unknown	Kaya–Iloilo	Biñan
				Stadium: Biñan Football Stadium

March 20, 2024 Friendly	Davao Aguilas	3–4	Kaya–Iloilo	Makati
	Ndour			Stadium: University of Makati Stadium

July 4, 2024 Friendly	Philippines U19	0–0	Kaya–Iloilo	Manila
				Stadium: Rizal Memorial Stadium

== Competitions ==
=== Overview ===
Competition	First match	Last match	Starting round	Final position	Record							
Competition	First match	Last match	Starting round	Final position	Pld	W	D	L	GF	GA	GD	Win %
Philippines Football League	April 7, 2024	July 13, 2024	Matchday 1	Winners	14	13	1	0	82	5	+77	92.86
ASEAN Club Championship	August 22, 2024	TBA	Matchday 1	TBD	0	0	0	0	0	0	+0	—
Total					14	13	1	0	82	5	+77	92.86

Last updated: July 13, 2024
Source: Competitions

=== Philippines Football League ===
==== Standings ====
Pos	Team	Pld	W	D	L	GF	GA	GD	Pts	Qualification
1	Kaya–Iloilo (Note: Assured a place in the AFC Champions League Two Group stage as 2023 Copa Paulino Alcantara Winners) (C)	14	13	1	0	82	5	+77	40	Qualification for 2024–25 AFC Champions League Two Group stage
2	Dynamic Herb Cebu	14	12	0	2	66	9	+57	36	Qualification for 2024–25 AFC Champions League Two Group stage
3	Stallion Laguna	14	10	2	2	65	12	+53	32	
4	Davao Aguilas	14	10	2	2	39	6	+33	32	
5	One Taguig	14	9	4	1	69	14	+55	31	
6	United City	14	9	3	2	51	13	+38	30	

Source: PFL
Rules for classification: 1) Points; 2) Goal difference; 3) Goals scored.
(C) Champions
Notes:

Results summary

Overall								Home						Away					
Pld	W	D	L	GF	GA	GD	Pts	W	D	L	GF	GA	GD	W	D	L	GF	GA	GD
14	13	1	0	82	5	+77	40	8	0	0	41	4	+37	5	1	0	41	1	+40

Last updated: May 8, 2024.
Source: pfl.org.ph/ PFL

==== Results by round ====
Round	1	2	3	4	5	6	7	8	9	10	11	12	13	14
Ground	A	A	A	A	H	H	H	H	H	A	H	H	H	A
Result	W	W	W	D	W	W	W	W	W	W	W	W	W	W
Position	5	1	2	3	3	1	1	1	1	1	1	1	1	1

Updated to match(es) played on July 4, 2024. Source: PFL
A = Away; H = Home; W = Win; D = Draw; L = Loss

==== Matches ====
April 7, 2024 1	United City	0–2	Kaya–Iloilo	Manila
17:30 UTC+8			Esso 4'; Melliza 81'	Stadium: Rizal Memorial Stadium

April 13, 2024 2	DB Garelli United	0–12	Kaya–Iloilo	Manila
20:30 UTC+8	Mahinay (yellow card) 26'; Zurbito (yellow card) 40'		Yamazaki 4', 23'; Komaki 6', 29'; Gayoso 8', 68', 86', 90+2'; Park Yi-young (yellow card) 31'; Melliza 38' (pen.); Lopez Mendy 66', 79'	Stadium: Rizal Memorial Stadium

April 21, 2024 3	Maharlika Taguig	1–10	Kaya–Iloilo	Manila
20:30 UTC+8	del Rosario 18'; Nkoa (yellow card) 80' (yellow-red card) 83'		Gayoso 5', 44'; Melliza 17', 47'; Komaki 20', 40', 45'; Casambre 54'; Menzi 58'; Esso 76'; Arboleda (yellow card) 83'	Stadium: Rizal Memorial Stadium

April 27, 2024 4	One Taguig	0–0	Kaya–Iloilo	Manila
17:45 UTC+8	Schröck (yellow card) 49'; Ingreso (yellow card) 90+5'		Diano (yellow card) 35'; Esso (yellow card) 61'	Stadium: Rizal Memorial Stadium

May 5, 2024 5	Kaya–Iloilo	1–0	Dynamic Herb Cebu	Pavia
15:45 UTC+8	Lopez Mendy 90+5'			Stadium: Campo Alcantara Stadium

May 8, 2024 6	Kaya–Iloilo	9–0	Philippine Air Force	Pavia
15:45 UTC+8	Angeles 13', 80'; Gayoso 22', 29', 68', 70' (pen.); Birrou (yellow card) 28'; Diano 64'; Bandiougou 79'; Lee Do-kyung 87'		Bronda (yellow card) 63'	Stadium: Campo Alcantara Stadium

May 29, 2024 7	Kaya–Iloilo	9–0	Tuloy	Manila
17:45 UTC+8	Gayoso 8', 42', 45', 45+2', 56', 64', 75'; Komaki 13'; Menzi 84'			Stadium: Rizal Memorial Stadium

June 2, 2024 8	Kaya–Iloilo	3–1	Manila Digger	Manila
17:45 UTC+8	Gayoso 18'; Lopez Mendy 67'; Komaki 79'		Jatta 26' Kuriyama (yellow card) 90+1'	Stadium: Rizal Memorial Stadium

June 9, 2024 9	Kaya–Iloilo	9–1	Mendiola 1991	Manila
20:30 UTC+8	Komaki 9', 71'; Esso 16'; Lopez Mendy 18', 28'; Menzi (red card) 44'; Melliza 50'; Yamazaki 54'; Bedic 75'; Edulan 90+1' (o.g.)		Aningalan (red card) 44'; Hajimehdi 65'; See (yellow card) 80'	Stadium: Rizal Memorial Stadium; Referee: Mick Jon Pineda

June 15, 2024 10	Manila Montet	0–14	Kaya–Iloilo	Manila
15:00 UTC+8			Rey 4', 27', 39', 58'; Lee Do-kyung 7', 11', 22', 34'; Basindanan 23'; Swainston 25'; Bedic 49' (pen.); Park Yi-young 53'; Angeles 90'; Gayoso 90+3'	Stadium: Rizal Memorial Stadium

June 22, 2024 11	Kaya–Iloilo	6–0	Philippine Army	Pavia
15:30 UTC+8	Lopez Mendy 21'; Gayoso 28', 74'; Diano 39'; Komaki 59'; Dorimon 70' (o.g.)		Ariola (yellow card) 84'	Stadium: Campo Alcantara Stadium

June 30, 2024 12	Kaya–Iloilo	3–2	Stallion Laguna	Manila
17:45 UTC+8	Melliza 45+1'; Menzi 58'; Gayoso (yellow card) 61', (goal) 88'; Park Yi-young (yellow card) 90+1'; Bedic (yellow card) 90+8'		McDaniel (yellow card) 51'; Gomez 71'; Placito 90+4', (yellow card) 90+7'	Stadium: Rizal Memorial Stadium

July 7, 2024 13	Kaya–Iloilo	1–0	Davao Aguilas	Manila
20:30 UTC+8	Gayoso 18' (pen.)			Stadium: Rizal Memorial Stadium; Referee: Clifford Daypuyat

July 13, 2024 14	Loyola	0–3	Kaya–Iloilo	Manila
17:45 UTC+8			Diano 28'; Rota 30'; Bedic 37'	Stadium: Rizal Memorial Stadium
