= 2021 Copa Paulino Alcantara final =

- Event: 2021 Copa Paulino Alcantara
Azkals Development Team	Kaya–Iloilo
0	1
- Date: 19 November 2021
- Venue: PFF National Training Center, Carmona
- Referee: Clifford Daypuyat
- Attendance: N/A

The final of the third season of the Copa Paulino Alcantara was contested by the Azkals Development Team and Kaya F.C.–Iloilo on 19 November 2021 on neutral ground at the PFF National Training Center in Carmona, Cavite.

== Background ==
Both ADT and Kaya–Iloilo were drawn to Group B along with Mendiola for the 2021 Copa Paulino Alcantara. Both teams faced against each other in their first match of the tournament. Kaya–Iloilo prevailed 2–0 over ADT. Kaya–Iloilo finished on the top of the group after winning 6–0 over Mendiola qualifying for the semifinals. ADT also qualified after routing Mendiola 9–0.

ADT and Kaya–Iloilo figured against the only two teams of Group A; Cebu and Stallion Laguna. The third team of that group, United City, withdrew assuring the remaining teams a place in the semifinals.

In the semifinals, ADT won 2–1 in extra time against Stallion Laguna after initially trailing by a goal, while Kaya–Iloilo scored the solitary goal in the late minutes of their semifinal match against Cebu through a penalty kick.

== Route to the final ==
Azkals Development Team		Round	Kaya–Iloilo	
Opponent	Result	Group stage	Opponent	Result
Kaya–Iloilo	0–2	Matchday 1	Azkals Development Team	2–0
Mendiola	9–0	Matchday 2	Mendiola	6–0
Group B runner-ups: Pos / Team / Pld / Pts; 1 / Kaya–Iloilo / 2 / 6; 2 / Azkals Development Team / 2 / 3; 3 / Mendiola 1991 / 2 / 0; Source: PFL		Final standings	Group B winners: Pos / Team / Pld / Pts; 1 / Kaya–Iloilo / 2 / 6; 2 / Azkals Development Team / 2 / 3; 3 / Mendiola 1991 / 2 / 0; Source: PFL	
Opponent	Result	Knockout phase	Opponent	Result
Stallion Laguna	2–1 (a.e.t.)	Semi-finals	Dynamic Herb Cebu	1–0

== Match summary ==
External videos
- 2021 Copa Paulino Alcantara Final
- Copa Paulino Alcantara 2021 Final - Azkals Development Team vs. Kaya FC-Iloilo by the Philippines Football League

The 2021 Copa Paulino Alcantara final was held on November 19, 2021 in the PFF National Training Center in Carmona, Cavite. No spectators were allowed due to the restrictions imposed by the COVID-19 pandemic in the Philippines. ADT were without the service of their captain Jarvey Gayoso, who scored six goals in the tournament after he suffered from a hamstring injury during the second half of ADT's semifinal match against Stallion Laguna. Kaya–Iloilo last clinched the Copa Paulino Alcantara title in 2018, when it won against Davao Aguilas in extra time in that tournament's final.

The match was disrupted by a power interruption but the match resumed after the issue was resolved. Both Kaya–Iloilo and the ADT were evenly matched in the first half, with Mar Diano clearing a shot from Jovin Bedic off the line. In the 47th minute a lofted cross from Simone Rota fell to Kenshiro Daniels, who poked it in the net to make it 1–0 in favor of Kaya–Iloilo. The ADT pushed for an equalizer and nearly got it when Mar Diano's header narrowly went over the crossbar. Despite more chances for the ADT, Kaya managed to hold on and eventually secured their 2nd ever Copa title.

The match ended in favor of Kaya–Iloilo, with a 1–0 scoreline. In doing so, Kaya became the first ever team to win the Copa Paulino Alcantara without conceding a single goal, scoring 10 goals in the process. Kaya also qualified as the country's representative in the 2022 AFC Champions League qualifying round, as well as earning a direct ticket to the 2022 AFC Cup.

November 19, 2021
19:45 UTC+8

ADT	0–1	Kaya–Iloilo
		Daniels 47'

PFF National Training Center, Carmona
Referee: Clifford Daypuyat

ADT	Kaya–Iloilo

GK	1	(Philippines) Quincy Kammeraad
	4	(Philippines) Mathew Custodio
	12	(Philippines) Mar Diano (c)
	18	(Philippines) Christian Rontini
	11	(Philippines) Yrick Gallantes
	22	(Philippines) Oskari Kekkonen
	9	(Philippines) Troy Limbo
	10	(Philippines) Oliver Bias
	21	(Philippines) Sandro Reyes
	7	(Philippines) Dennis Chung
	17	(Philippines) Ivan Ouano	(substituted off) 66'
Substitutes:
GK	15	(Philippines) Anton Yared
	3	(Philippines) Frederico Alegre
	5	(Philippines) Pete Forrosuelo
	8	(Philippines) Kainoa Bailey	(substituted in) 66'
	13	(Philippines) Andres Aldeguer
	23	(Philippines) Jethro Borlongan
	24	(Philippines) Vincent Parpan
Head Coach:
(Philippines) Giovanni Villagracia

Starting XI

GK	25	(Philippines) Louie Casas
	23	(Philippines) Simone Rota
	19	(Trinidad and Tobago) Carlyle Mitchell
	44	(Philippines) Audie Menzi
	21	(Philippines) Dylan De Bruycker	(yellow card) 44' (yellow-red card) 90+3'
	8	(Philippines) Marwin Angeles		(substituted off) 61'
	4	(Japan) Masanari Omura		(substituted off) 80'
	14	(Japan) Ryo Fujii
	10	(Philippines) Kenshiro Daniels		(substituted off) 89'
	20	(Japan) Daizo Horikoshi	(yellow card) 76'
	7	(Philippines) Jovin Bedic (c)
Substitutes:
GK	1	(Philippines) Zach Banzon
	5	(Philippines) Camelo Tacusalme
	27	(Philippines) Shirmar Felongco		(substituted in) 61'
	13	(Philippines) Jesus Melliza		(substituted in) 89'
	17	(Philippines) Arnel Amita		(substituted in) 80'
	9	(Philippines) Eric Giganto
	22	(Philippines) Fitch Arboleda
Head Coach:
(Japan) Yu Hoshide
