= UAAP Season 79 Men's Football Final =

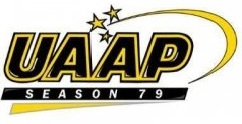
- Event: UAAP Season 79 football tournaments
Ateneo Blue Eagles	FEU Tamaraws
1	0
- Date: 7 May 2017
- Venue: Rizal Memorial Stadium, Manila
- Attendance: 120
- Weather: Fine

The UAAP Season 79 Men's Football Final took place on 7 May 2017 at the Rizal Memorial Stadium.It was the final match of the UAAP Season 79 football tournaments of the UAAP Season 79. It was contested between the Ateneo Blue Eagles and the FEU Tamaraws. Ateneo won 1-0, with Jarvey Gayoso's goal at the 39th minute to claim their seventh UAAP Football Championship title.

== Route to the Final ==
The Final Four of the tournament were #1 seed Ateneo Blue Eagles, #2 UP Fighting Maroons, #3 FEU Tamaraws, and #4 UST Growling Tigers who just finished from the Elimination Round. The number 1 seeded team Ateneo Blue Eagles beat the #4 team UST Growling Tigers 2-1, and in the other match, the number 3 seeded team FEU Tamaraws beat the defending champions and the number 2 seeded team UP Fighting Maroons 1-2. Ateneo Blue Eagles met the FEU Tamaraws in the championship match.

=== Team standings ===
Pos	Team	Pld	W	D	L	GF	GA	GD	Pts	Qualification
1	Ateneo Blue Eagles	14	11	2	1	33	7	+26	35	Semifinals
2	UP Fighting Maroons	14	8	4	2	21	8	+13	28	Semifinals
3	FEU Tamaraws	14	6	4	4	20	12	+8	22	Semifinals
4	UST Growling Tigers (H)	14	6	3	5	18	16	+2	21	Semifinals
5	NU Bulldogs	14	6	1	7	17	19	−2	19	
6	De La Salle Green Archers	14	4	4	6	12	13	−1	16	
7	UE Red Warriors	14	4	2	8	13	25	−12	14	
8	Adamson Soaring Falcons	14	1	0	13	8	40	−32	3	

Source: ABS-CBN Sports
(H) Hosts

=== Playoffs ===
Semifinals
1	**Ateneo**	**2**
4	UST	1
2	UP	1
3	**FEU**	**2**

Finals
1	**Ateneo**	**1**
3	FEU	0

Bold = winner
* = after extra time, ( ) = penalty shootout score

=== Semifinals ===
May 4, 2017
15:00 UTC+8

Ateneo Blue Eagles	2–1	UST Growling Tigers
Jarvey Gayoso 22' 44'		Marvin Bricenio 54'

Rizal Memorial Stadium
May 4, 2017
17:00 UTC+8

UP Fighting Maroons	1–2	FEU Tamaraws
Kintaro Miyagi 24'		Rico Andes 23' 57'

Rizal Memorial Stadium

== Match ==
Jarvey Gayoso scored for Ateneo in the 39th minute with a winning left-foot attack that finally penetrated FEU's defense after a deflation to give Ateneo a good end of the first half. In the second half, the FEU Tamaraws had several offsides and free kicks but it did not change the momentum of the match and Ateneo claimed their seventh title of the UAAP Football Championship. Ateneo last tasted the championship victory in 2012.

=== Details ===
May 7, 2017
15:00 UTC+8

Ateneo Blue Eagles	1–0	FEU Tamaraws
Jarvey Gayoso 39'

Rizal Memorial Stadium
Attendance: 120

Ateneo Blue Eagles	FEU Tamaraws

GK	1	(Philippines) Alexandre Jae Arcilla
RB	88	(Philippines) (England) William Jay Grierson
CB	29	(Philippines) Jeremiah Rocha
LB	27	(Philippines) Joseph Gerard Poe
DM	7	(Philippines) Julian Roxas
RW	2	(Philippines) (England) Jordan Jarvis
LW	15	(Philippines) Alfredo Mathay
RM	16	(Philippines) Mario Ceniza
LM	19	(Philippines) Inigo Herrera
RF	18	(Philippines) Carlo Liay
LF	11	(Philippines) Jarvey Gayoso
Manager:
(Philippines) Jaypee Merida

GK	19	(Philippines) Ray Joseph Joyel
RB	88	(Philippines) John Renz Saldivar
CB	44	(Philippines) Audie Menzi
CB	26	(Philippines) Reymart Cubon
LB	37	(Philippines) Resty Monterona
CDM	11	(Philippines) Michael Menzi
RM	8	(Philippines) Dominique Canonigo
LM	39	(Philippines) Paolo Bugas
RW	7	(Philippines) Rico Andes
LW	29	(Philippines) Val Jurao
CF	12	(Philippines) Nickael Ferrer
Manager:
(Philippines) Vince Santos

Match rules

- 90 minutes.
- 30 minutes of extra-time if necessary.
- Penalty shoot-out if scores still level.
- Seven named substitutes.
- Maximum of three substitutions.

== Broadcasting ==
The match was broadcast live on ABS-CBN Sports+Action for regular channel and ABS-CBN Sports+Action HD via livestream and Cable TV. The match commentators were Bob Guerrero and Armand Del Rosario.

== Attendance ==
The match was attended by 120 people in Rizal Memorial Stadium. Some notable spectators were the FEU Lady Tamaraws Volleyball team, FEU Courtside Reporter Ganiel Krishnan, former Ateneo Blue Eagles basketball star Chris Newsome, and several players from the Ateneo Lady Eagles and Ateneo Blue Eagles Volleyball team.
