= List of Cebu F.C. seasons =

Cebu F.C. commonly known as Dynamic Herb Cebu or DH Cebu, is a Filipino professional football team based in Talisay, Cebu. Founded in 2021, the club played its first professional game on November 11, 2021, when they participated at the Copa Paulino Alcantara.

The club have been runners-up twice in the Philippines Football League and has appeared at two continental tournaments.

== History ==
The club, founded in 2021. Were given a provisional-license on August 24, 2021, allowing it to compete in the Philippines Football League. Originally planned to debut in the 2021 season, the season was cancelled due to the COVID-19 pandemic. Instead, the domestic cup, Copa Paulino Alcantara. Took its place in lieu of the competition.

In 2022, the club secured a partnership with Turkish Süper Lig club, Hatayspor. The club officially debuted in the Philippines Football League in the 2022-23 season where they lost 3–0 against eventual champions Kaya F.C.–Iloilo. Furthermore, the club finished second in the season and qualified for the first-time in the AFC Cup. Cebu FC made their continental debut on September 21, 2023, against Cambodian side Phnom Penh Crown FC where they lost 0–3 at home. On October 26, 2023, the club won its first continental match against Burmese side Shan United F.C. 1–0.

== Key ==
- Pld = Matches played
- W = Matches won
- D = Matches drawn
- L = Matches lost
- GF = Goals for
- GA = Goals against
- Pts = Points
- Pos = Final position
- PFL = Philippines Football League
- F = Final
- Group = Group stage
- QF = Quarter-finals
- SF = Semi-finals

Winners	Runners-up

== Seasons ==
Correct as of the end of the 2024 Philippines Football League.

Seasons of Cebu F.C.
Season	League										Copa Paulino Alcantara	AFC Champions League Two/AFC Cup	Top goalscorer(s)	
Season	Division	Tier	P	W	D	L	GF	GA	Pts	Pos	Copa Paulino Alcantara	AFC Champions League Two/AFC Cup	Player(s)	Goals
2021	PFL	1	Cancelled due to enhanced community quarantine.								SF	–	–	
2022	PFL	1	22	15	6	1	52	23	51	2nd	SF	–	Arda Çınkır (Note: Only goals from 2022 Copa Paulino Alcantara)	4
2023	PFL	1	22	15	6	1	52	23	51	2nd	SF	–	Arda Çınkır	14
2024	PFL	1	14	12	0	2	65	12	36	2nd	–	Group (3rd)	Zamoranho Ho-A-Tham	11
