= UAAP Season 79 football tournaments =

Philippine college football tournament

UAAP Season 79 Football
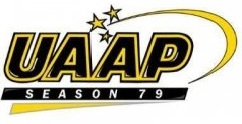
- Host school: University of Santo Tomas
Men's Finals	G1	Wins
Ateneo Blue Eagles	1	1
FEU Tamaraws	0	0
- Duration: May 7, 2017
- Arena: Rizal Memorial Stadium
- Finals MVP: (Philippines) Jarvey Gayoso
- Winning coach: (Philippines) Jaypee Merida
- Semifinalists: UST Growling Tigers; UP Fighting Maroons
- TV network: ABS-CBN Sports+Action
Women's Finals	G1	Wins
De La Salle Lady Archers	3	1
UST Growling Tigresses	1	0
- Duration: May 07,2017
- Arena: Rizal Memorial Stadium
- Winning coach: Hans-Peter Smit
- TV network: ABS-CBN Sports+Action
Juniors' Finals	G1	Wins
FEU–D Baby Tamaraws	1	1
Zobel Junior Archers	0	0
- Arena: Rizal Memorial Stadium
- Finals MVP: Orlan Togores

The UAAP Season 79 seniors division football tournament started on February 4, 2017, following the shift in the start of the league at the Rizal Memorial Stadium in Manila. Other games were held at the Moro Lorenzo Football Field of Ateneo de Manila University in Katipunan Ave., Loyola Heights, Quezon City.

== Venues ==
Quezon City	Quezon City	Manila
FEU Diliman Football Field	Moro Lorenzo Football Field	Rizal Memorial Stadium
Capacity: 500	Capacity: 900	Capacity: 20,000

== Men's tournament ==
=== Elimination round ===
==== Team standing ====
Pos	Team	Pld	W	D	L	GF	GA	GD	Pts	Qualification
1	Ateneo Blue Eagles	14	11	2	1	33	7	+26	35	Semifinals
2	UP Fighting Maroons	14	8	4	2	21	8	+13	28	Semifinals
3	FEU Tamaraws	14	6	4	4	20	12	+8	22	Semifinals
4	UST Growling Tigers (H)	14	6	3	5	18	16	+2	21	Semifinals
5	NU Bulldogs	14	6	1	7	17	19	−2	19	
6	De La Salle Green Archers	14	4	4	6	12	13	−1	16	
7	UE Red Warriors	14	4	2	8	13	25	−12	14	
8	Adamson Soaring Falcons	14	1	0	13	8	40	−32	3	

Source: ABS-CBN Sports
(H) Hosts

===== Match-up results =====
	Round 1							Round 2						
Team ╲ Game	1	2	3	4	5	6	7	8	9	10	11	12	13	14
AdU	Ateneo school colors	FEU school colors	La Salle school colors	UST school colors	NU school colors	UE school colors	UP school colors	La Salle school colors	UST school colors	NU school colors	UP school colors	Ateneo school colors	FEU school colors	UE school colors
AdMU	Adamson school colors	NU school colors	UST school colors	La Salle school colors	UE school colors	UP school colors	FEU school colors	UP school colors	NU school colors	UST school colors	Adamson school colors	UE school colors	La Salle school colors	FEU school colors
DLSU	UP school colors	UE school colors	Ateneo school colors	Adamson school colors	FEU school colors	UST school colors	NU school colors	Adamson school colors	UE school colors	FEU school colors	NU school colors	UP school colors	Ateneo school colors	UST school colors
FEU	UST school colors	Adamson school colors	NU school colors	La Salle school colors	UP school colors	UE school colors	Ateneo school colors	NU school colors	UP school colors	La Salle school colors	UE school colors	Adamson school colors	UST school colors	Ateneo school colors
NU	UE school colors	Ateneo school colors	UP school colors	FEU school colors	Adamson school colors	La Salle school colors	UST school colors	FEU school colors	Ateneo school colors	Adamson school colors	UE school colors	La Salle school colors	UST school colors	UP school colors
UE	NU school colors	UP school colors	La Salle school colors	UST school colors	Ateneo school colors	Adamson school colors	FEU school colors	UST school colors	La Salle school colors	UP school colors	NU school colors	FEU school colors	Ateneo school colors	Adamson school colors
UP	La Salle school colors	UE school colors	NU school colors	UST school colors	Ateneo school colors	FEU school colors	Adamson school colors	Ateneo school colors	FEU school colors	UE school colors	Adamson school colors	UST school colors	La Salle school colors	NU school colors
UST	FEU school colors	Ateneo school colors	UE school colors	UP school colors	Adamson school colors	La Salle school colors	NU school colors	UE school colors	Adamson school colors	Ateneo school colors	UP school colors	NU school colors	FEU school colors	La Salle school colors

= Win; = Draw; = Loss

===== Scores =====
Team	AdU	ADMU	DLSU	FEU	NU	UE	UP	UST
Adamson		0–4	1–0	0–4	1–2	1–2	1–2	0–3
Ateneo	7–1		1–0	0–0	3–0	3–1	1–0	5–1
DLSU	2–0	0–2		0–1	1–3	2–0	0–0	2–2
FEU	5–1	1–3	1–1		1–0	1–1	0–0	2–0
NU	4–0	0–1	0–1	1–2		2–2	0–4	1–0
UE	1–0	2–1	0–2	2–1	0–1		0–4	1–2
UP	3–1	1–1	2–1	1–0	1–2	3–1		1–0
UST	4–1	0–1	0–0	2–1	2–1	2–0	0–0	

Legend: Blue = left column team win; Yellow = draw; Red = top row team win.

==== First round ====
4 February 2017
14:00 UTC+8

UE Red Warriors	2–2	NU Bulldogs
Mar Diano 14'; Bon Opeña 26'	Report	Patrick Valenzuela 82'; Lawrence Colina 87'

Rizal Memorial Stadium
4 February 2017
16:00 UTC+8

De La Salle Green Archers	0–0	UP Fighting Maroons
	Report

Rizal Memorial Stadium

5 February 2017
15:00 UTC+8

FEU Tamaraws	2–0	UST Growling Tigers
Val Jurao 33'; Rico Andes 35'	Report

Rizal Memorial Stadium
5 February 2017
17:00 UTC+8

Ateneo Blue Eagles	4–0	Adamson Soaring Falcons
Jarvey Gayoso 4', 71'; Iñigo Herrera 57'; Samuel Lim 67'	Report

Rizal Memorial Stadium

9 February 2017
14:00 UTC+8

Ateneo Blue Eagles	3–0	NU Bulldogs
Samuel Lim 45+2'; Jarvey Gayoso 47'; Lorenzo Ceniza 78'	Report

Moro Lorenzo Football Field
9 February 2017
16:00 UTC+8

UE Red Warriors	0–4	UP Fighting Maroons
	Report	Daniel Saavedra 32'; Sean Patangan 38'; Kintaro Miyagi 45'; Ray Sanciangco 61'

Moro Lorenzo Football Field

11 February 2017
16:00 UTC+8

Adamson Soaring Falcons	0–4	FEU Tamaraws
	Report	Dominique Canonigo 16'; Rico Andes 38', 67'; Val Jurao 45+1'

Rizal Memorial Stadium

12 February 2017
14:00 UTC+8

De La Salle Green Archers	2–0	UE Red Warriors
Yoshiharu Koizumi 17'; John Saldivar 79' (o.g.)	Report

Rizal Memorial Stadium
12 February 2017
16:00 UTC+8

NU Bulldogs	0–4	UP Fighting Maroons
	Report	Jeremiah Borlongan 22', 27'; Kintaro Miyagi 49'; James Condat 77'

Rizal Memorial Stadium
12 February 2017
16:00 UTC+8

UST Growling Tigers	1–5	Ateneo Blue Eagles
AJ Pasion 11'	Report	Jarvey Gayoso 10'; Ryan Haosen 37'; Rupert Baña 60'; Paolo Alilam 81', 90+4'

Rizal Memorial Stadium

16 February 2017
14:00 UTC+8

UE Red Warriors	1–2	UST Growling Tigers
Jo Mallen 10'	Report	AJ Pasion 42'; John De Castro 56'

Moro Lorenzo Football Field
16 February 2017
16:00 UTC+8

De La Salle Green Archers	0–1	Ateneo Blue Eagles
	Report	Jarvey Gayoso 36'

Moro Lorenzo Football Field
Attendance: 190

18 February 2017
16:00 UTC+8

NU Bulldogs	0–1	FEU Tamaraws
	Report	Audie Menzi 49'

Rizal Memorial Stadium

19 February 2017
09:00 UTC+8

De La Salle Green Archers	0–1	Adamson Soaring Falcons
	Report	Ejike Ugwoke 58'

FEU Diliman Football Field
19 February 2017
13:00 UTC+8

Ateneo Blue Eagles	3–1	UE Red Warriors
Lorenzo Ceniza 16'; Samuel Lim 30'; Jordan Jarvis 39'	Report	Bon Opeña 71'

FEU Diliman Football Field
19 February 2017
15:00 UTC+8

UP Fighting Maroons	1–0	UST Growling Tigers
Marco Casambre 14'	Report

FEU Diliman Football Field

23 February 2017
14:00 UTC+8

Adamson Soaring Falcons	0–3	UST Growling Tigers
	Report	Dexter Benecio 32'; Jayson Rafol 66'; Marvin Bricenio 79'

Moro Lorenzo Football Field
23 February 2017
16:00 UTC+8

FEU Tamaraws	1–0	De La Salle Green Archers
Nicolas Ferrer 34'	Report

Moro Lorenzo Football Field

26 February 2017
14:00 UTC+8

UP Fighting Maroons	0–1	Ateneo Blue Eagles
	Report	Lorenzo Ceniza 70'

Rizal Memorial Stadium
26 February 2017
16:00 UTC+8

Adamson Soaring Falcons	1–2	NU Bulldogs
Khristian Melliza 47' (pen.)	Report	Patrick Valenzuela 7'; Elmer Sampaga 40'

Rizal Memorial Stadium
26 February 2017
18:00 UTC+8

UST Growling Tigers	2–2	De La Salle Green Archers
Jason Rafol 25', 50'	Report	Marcus Garcia 36'; Jose Montelibano 90+2'

Rizal Memorial Stadium

2 March 2017
14:00 UTC+8

NU Bulldogs	3–1	De La Salle Green Archers
Lawrence Colina 76', 84' (pen.), 90+2'	Report	Rigo Joseph 53'

Moro Lorenzo Football Field
2 March 2017
16:00 UTC+8

Adamson Soaring Falcons	1–2	UE Red Warriors
Ejike Ugwoke 41'	Report	Mark Anthony Lerion 7'; Alberto Lechin 89'

Moro Lorenzo Football Field
2 March 2017
18:00 UTC+8

FEU Tamaraws	0–0	UP Fighting Maroons
	Report

Moro Lorenzo Football Field

5 March 2017
15:00 UTC+8

UP Fighting Maroons	2–1	Adamson Soaring Falcons
Kyle Magdato 43'; Julian Clarino 55'	Report	Bless Jumo II 45+2'

Rizal Memorial Stadium
5 March 2017
18:00 UTC+8

UE Red Warriors	1–1	FEU Tamaraws
Mar Diano 5'	Report	Audie Menzi 25'

Rizal Memorial Stadium

9 March 2017
14:00 UTC+8

UST Growling Tigers	0–1	NU Bulldogs

Moro Lorenzo Football Field
9 March 2017
16:00 UTC+8

Ateneo Blue Eagles	0–0	FEU Tamaraws

Moro Lorenzo Football Field

12 March 2017
15:00 UTC+8

FEU Tamaraws	2–1	NU Bulldogs

Rizal Memorial Stadium
12 March 2017
17:00 UTC+8

Ateneo Blue Eagles	1–1	UP Fighting Maroons

Rizal Memorial Stadium

==== Second round ====
16 March 2017
14:00 UTC+8

UE Red Warriors	0–2	UST Growling Tigers

Moro Lorenzo Football Field
16 March 2017
16:00 UTC+8

De La Salle Green Archers	2–0	Adamson Soaring Falcons

Moro Lorenzo Football Field

18 March 2017
17:00 UTC+8

NU Bulldogs	0–1	Ateneo Blue Eagles

Rizal Memorial Stadium
18 March 2017
19:00 UTC+8

UP Fighting Maroons	1–0	FEU Tamaraws

Rizal Memorial Stadium

19 March 2017
15:00 UTC+8

De La Salle Green Archers	2–0	UE Red Warriors

Rizal Memorial Stadium
19 March 2017
19:00 UTC+8

Adamson Soaring Falcons	1–3	UST Growling Tigers

Rizal Memorial Stadium

23 March 2017
14:00 UTC+8

NU Bulldogs	4–0	Adamson Soaring Falcons

Moro Lorenzo Football Field
23 March 2017
16:00 UTC+8

UP Fighting Maroons	3–1	UE Red Warriors

Moro Lorenzo Football Field

25 March 2017
17:00 UTC+8

De La Salle Green Archers	1–1	FEU Tamaraws

Rizal Memorial Stadium
25 March 2017
19:00 UTC+8

Ateneo Blue Eagles	1–0	UST Growling Tigers

Rizal Memorial Stadium

26 March 2017
09:00 UTC+8

Adamson Soaring Falcons	1–3	UP Fighting Maroons

FEU Diliman Football Field
26 March 2017
15:00 UTC+8

UE Red Warriors	0–1	NU Bulldogs

FEU Diliman Football Field

30 March 2017
14:00 UTC+8

UST Growling Tigers	0–0	UP Fighting Maroons

Moro Lorenzo Football Field
30 March 2017
16:00 UTC+8

De La Salle Green Archers	1–0	NU Bulldogs

Moro Lorenzo Football Field

1 April 2017
15:00 UTC+8

UE Red Warriors	2–1	FEU Tamaraws

Rizal Memorial Stadium
1 April 2017
17:00 UTC+8

Adamson Soaring Falcons	1–7	Ateneo Blue Eagles

Rizal Memorial Stadium

2 April 2017
15:00 UTC+8

UST Growling Tigers	2–1	NU Bulldogs

Rizal Memorial Stadium
2 April 2017
17:00 UTC+8

UP Fighting Maroons	2–1	De La Salle Green Archers

Rizal Memorial Stadium

6 April 2017
14:00 UTC+8

Adamson Soaring Falcons	1–5	FEU Tamaraws

Moro Lorenzo Football Field
6 April 2017
16:00 UTC+8

UE Red Warriors	2–1	Ateneo Blue Eagles

Moro Lorenzo Football Field

9 April 2017
15:00 UTC+8

FEU Tamaraws	1–2	UST Growling Tigers

Rizal Memorial Stadium
9 April 2017
17:00 UTC+8

Ateneo Blue Eagles	2–0	De La Salle Green Archers

Rizal Memorial Stadium
9 April 2017
19:00 UTC+8

UE Red Warriors	1–0	Adamson Soaring Falcons

Rizal Memorial Stadium

20 April 2017
14:00 UTC+8

De La Salle Green Archers	0–0	UST Growling Tigers

Moro Lorenzo Football Field
20 April 2017
16:00 UTC+8

Ateneo Blue Eagles	3–1	FEU Tamaraws

Moro Lorenzo Football Field
20 April 2017
18:00 UTC+8

UP Fighting Maroons	1–2	NU Bulldogs

Moro Lorenzo Football Field

=== Playoffs ===
Semifinals
1	**Ateneo**	**2**
4	UST	1
2	UP	1
3	**FEU**	**2**

Finals
1	**Ateneo**	**1**
3	FEU	0

Bold = winner
* = after extra time, ( ) = penalty shootout score

=== Semifinals ===
May 4, 2017
15:00 UTC+8

Ateneo Blue Eagles	2–1	UST Growling Tigers
Jarvey Gayoso 22' 44'		Marvin Bricenio 54'

Rizal Memorial Stadium
May 4, 2017
17:00 UTC+8

UP Fighting Maroons	1–2	FEU Tamaraws
Kintaro Miyagi 24'		Rico Andes 23' 57'

Rizal Memorial Stadium

=== Finals ===
May 7, 2017
15:00 UTC+8

Ateneo Blue Eagles	1–0	FEU Tamaraws
Jarvey Gayoso 39'

Rizal Memorial Stadium
Attendance: 120

=== Awards ===
UAAP Season 79 men's football champions
Ateneo Blue Eagles
Seventh title

- Most Valuable Player: Jarvey Gayoso (Ateneo de Manila University)
- Rookie of the Year: Jordan Jarvis (Ateneo de Manila University)
- Best Striker: Jarvey Gayoso (Ateneo De Manila University)
- Best Midfielder: Paolo Bugas (Far Eastern University)
- Best Defender: Jeremiah Rocha (Ateneo de Manila University)
- Best Goalkeeper: AJ Arcilla (Ateneo de Manila University)

=== Mythical Eleven ===
- Goalkeeper: AJ Arcilla (Ateneo de Manila University)
- Defenders: Jeremiah Rocha (Ateneo de Manila University), Noel Brago (De La Salle University), Jordan Jarvis (Ateneo de Manila University), Darryl Regala (University of Santo Tomas)
- Midfielders: Paolo Bugas (Far Eastern University), Enzo Ceniza (Ateneo De Manila University), Julian Roxas (Ateneo De Manila University), Jed Diamante (De La Salle University)
- Strikers: Jarvey Gayoso (Ateneo de Manila University), Rico Andes (Far Eastern University)

== Women's tournament ==
=== Elimination round ===
==== Team standing ====
Pos	Team	Pld	W	D	L	GF	GA	GD	Pts	Qualification
1	De La Salle Lady Archers	8	8	0	0	27	5	+22	24	Finals
2	UST Growling Tigresses (H)	8	4	1	3	16	18	−2	13	Finals
3	Ateneo Lady Eagles	8	2	2	4	14	22	−8	8	One-game playoff
4	UP Fighting Maroons	8	1	3	4	7	14	−7	6	
5	FEU Lady Tamaraws	8	1	2	5	11	16	−5	5	

Source: ABS-CBN Sports
(H) Hosts

==== First round ====
11 February 2017
14:00 UTC+8

UP Lady Maroons	0–1	Ateneo Lady Eagles
	Report	Nona Amoncio 5'

Rizal Memorial Stadium
11 February 2017
18:00 UTC+8

FEU Lady Tamaraws	1–2	UST Growling Tigresses
Jovelle Sudaria 77'	Report	Hazel Lustan 56'; Charisa Lemoran 61'

Rizal Memorial Stadium

18 February 2017
14:00 UTC+8

Ateneo Lady Eagles	4–3	FEU Lady Tamaraws
Pamela Diaz 19'; Camille Rodriguez 27' (pen.), 76', 78'	Report	Nina Catedrilla 13' (o.g.); Jovelle Sudaria 20'; Bia Requerme 58'

Rizal Memorial Stadium
18 February 2017
18:00 UTC+8

De La Salle Lady Archers	2–1	UP Lady Maroons
Kyrhen Dimaandal 45+1'; Kyla Inquig 48'	Report	BG Sta. Clara 55'

Rizal Memorial Stadium

25 February 2017
14:00 UTC+8

UP Lady Maroons	0–0	FEU Lady Tamaraws
	Report

Rizal Memorial Stadium
25 February 2017
16:00 UTC+8

De La Salle Lady Archers	6–2	UST Growling Tigresses
Sara Castañeda 13', 54'; Kyrhen Dimaandal 30', 90+2'; Nicole Andaya 34', 52'	Report	Charisa Lemoran 47', 76'

Rizal Memorial Stadium

4 March 2017
15:00 UTC+8

UST Growling Tigresses	1–0	UP Lady Maroons
Hazel Lustan 85'	Report

Rizal Memorial Stadium
4 March 2017
17:00 UTC+8

Ateneo Lady Eagles	0–3	De La Salle Lady Archers
	Report	Kyra Dimaandal 41'; Nicole Andaya 55'; Irish Navaja 69'

Rizal Memorial Stadium

11 March 2017
15:00 UTC+8

FEU Lady Tamaraws	0–1	De La Salle Lady Archers

Rizal Memorial Stadium
11 March 2017
17:00 UTC+8

UST Growling Tigresses	3–2	Ateneo Lady Eagles

Rizal Memorial Stadium

==== Second round ====
18 March 2017
15:00 UTC+8

UP Lady Maroons	2–1	UST Growling Tigresses

Rizal Memorial Stadium

19 March 2017
17:00 UTC+8

Ateneo Lady Eagles	2–3	FEU Lady Tamaraws

Rizal Memorial Stadium

25 March 2017
15:00 UTC+8

De La Salle Lady Archers	2–1	FEU Lady Tamaraws

Rizal Memorial Stadium

26 March 2017
13:00 UTC+8

Ateneo Lady Eagles	2–2	UST Growling Tigresses

FEU Diliman Football Field

29 March 2017
13:00 UTC+8

FEU Lady Tamaraws	1–1	UP Lady Maroons

FEU Diliman Football Field
29 March 2017
15:00 UTC+8

De La Salle Lady Archers	5–0	Ateneo Lady Eagles

FEU Diliman Football Field

19 April 2017
13:00 UTC+8

FEU Lady Tamaraws	2–4	UST Growling Tigresses

FEU Diliman Football Field
19 April 2017
15:00 UTC+8

UP Lady Maroons	0–5	De La Salle Lady Archers

FEU Diliman Football Field

23 April 2017
15:00 UTC+8

Ateneo Lady Eagles	3–3	UP Lady Maroons

Moro Lorenzo Football Field
23 April 2017
17:00 UTC+8

UST Growling Tigresses	1–3	De La Salle Lady Archers

Moro Lorenzo Football Field

=== Playoffs ===
May 4, 2017
08:00 UTC+8

UST Growling Tigresses	5–4	Ateneo Lady Eagles

Rizal Memorial Stadium

=== Finals ===
May 7, 2017
18:00 UTC+8

De La Salle Lady Archers	3–1	UST Growling Tigresses
Kyra Dimaandal 57'; Sara Castañeda 85'; Inna Palacios 93' (pen.)		Hazel Lustan 73'

Rizal Memorial Stadium

=== Awards ===
UAAP Season 79 women's football champions
De La Salle Lady Archers
Ninth title, fifth consecutive title

- Most Valuable Player: Kyla Inquig (De La Salle University)
- Rookie of the Year: Mary Indac (University of Santo Tomas)
- Best Striker: Kyra Dimaandal (De La Salle University)
- Best Midfielder: Sara Castañeda (De La Salle University)
- Best Defender: Regine Metillo (De La Salle University)
- Best Goalkeeper: Inna Palacios (De La Salle University)

=== Mythical Eleven ===
- Goalkeeper: Inna Palacios (De La Salle University)
- Defenders: Regine Metillo (De La Salle University), Isay Sabio (Ateneo de Manila University), Ira Ilan (University of Santo Tomas), Mariel Tejada (De La Salle University)
- Midfielders: Sara Castañeda (De La Salle University), Hazel Lustan (University of Santo Tomas), Irish Navaja (De La Salle University), Cam Rodriguez (Ateneo De Manila University)
- Strikers: Kyra Dimaandal (De La Salle University), Charisa Lemoran (University of Santo Tomas)

== Juniors' tournament ==
=== Elimination round ===
==== Team standing ====
Pos	Team	Pld	W	D	L	GF	GA	GD	Pts	Qualification
1	FEU–D Baby Tamaraws	6	5	0	1	24	6	+18	15	Finals
2	Zobel Junior Archers	6	5	0	1	18	7	+11	15	Finals
3	Ateneo Blue Eaglets (H)	6	0	2	4	4	17	−13	2	
4	UST Tiger Cubs	6	0	2	4	7	23	−16	2	

Source: ABS-CBN Sports
(H) Hosts

==== Match-up results ====
	Round 1			Round 2		
Team ╲ Game	1	2	3	4	5	6
AdMU	UST school colors	La Salle school colors	FEU school colors	FEU school colors	La Salle school colors	UST school colors
DLSU	FEU school colors	Ateneo school colors	UST school colors	UST school colors	Ateneo school colors	FEU school colors
FEU	La Salle school colors	UST school colors	Ateneo school colors	Ateneo school colors	UST school colors	La Salle school colors
UST	Ateneo school colors	FEU school colors	La Salle school colors	La Salle school colors	FEU school colors	Ateneo school colors

= Win; = Draw; = Loss

==== Scores ====
Results to the right and top of the gray cells are first round games, those to the left and below are second round games.

Team	AdMU	FEU	DLSU	UST
AdMU		0–4	0–1	0–0
FEU	2–0		1–2	7–1
DLSZ	6–0	2–5		4–1
UST	4–4	1–5	0–3	

Legend: Blue = left column team win; Yellow = draw; Red = top row team win.

=== Final ===
February 4, 2017

FEU–D Baby Tamaraws	1–0	Zobel Junior Archers
Chester Gio Pabualan 29'

Rizal Memorial Stadium

=== Awards ===
UAAP Season 79 juniors' football champions
FEU–D Baby Tamaraws
Seventh title, seventh consecutive title

- Most Valuable Player: Orlan Togores (Far Eastern University-Diliman)
- Rookie of the Year: Jermi Darapan (Far Eastern University-Diliman)
- Best Striker: Keith Absalon (Far Eastern University-Diliman)
- Best Midfielder: Chester Gio Pabualan (Far Eastern University-Diliman)
- Best Defender: Keith Absalon (Far Eastern University-Diliman)
- Best Goalkeeper: Gavin Rosario (Ateneo de Manila University)
- Fair Play Award: De La Salle-Zobel

== Overall championship points ==
=== Seniors' division ===
Team	Men	Women	Total
Adamson Soaring Falcons	1	—	1
Ateneo Blue Eagles	15	10	25
De La Salle Green Archers	4	15	19
FEU Tamaraws	12	6	18
NU Bulldogs	6	—	6
UE Red Warriors	2	—	2
UP Fighting Maroons	10	8	18
UST Growling Tigers	8	8	16

=== Juniors' division ===
Team	Boys'	Points
FEU–D Baby Tamaraws	15	15
Zobel Junior Archers	12	12
Ateneo Blue Eaglets	10	10
UST Tiger Cubs	8	8

Pts.	Ranking
15	Champion
12	2nd
10	3rd
8	4th
6	5th
4	6th
2	7th
1	8th
—	Did not join
WD	Withdrew

== See also ==
- UAAP Season 79
