= Pete Forrosuelo =

Filipino footballer (born 1999)

Personal information
- Full name: Pete Andrei Pareja Forrosuelo
- Date of birth: July 6, 1999 (age 27)
- Place of birth: Sindangan, Zamboanga del Norte, Philippines
- Position: Full-back

Team information
- Current team: One Taguig
- Number: 99

Youth career
- FEU Baby Tamaraws

College career
Years	Team	Apps	(Gls)
2019–2021	Far Eastern University		

Senior career*
Years	Team	Apps	(Gls)
2021–2022	Azkals Development Team	3	(0)
2022	United City	17	(0)
2023	Rajpracha	0	(0)
2023–2024	Davao Aguilas	8	(0)
2024	United City	3	(0)
2024–2025	Loyola	16	(0)
2025–	One Taguig	10	(0)

International career^{‡}
2018	Philippines U19	5	(0)
2019–2022	Philippines U23	5	(0)
2022–	Philippines	1	(0)
- * Club domestic league appearances and goals as of 9:51, 5 May 2024 (UTC) ‡ National team caps and goals as of 9:51, November 4, 2023 (UTC)

Pete Andrei Pareja Forrosuelo (born 6 July 1999) is a Filipino professional footballer who plays as a full-back for Philippine club One Taguig and the Philippines national team.

== College career ==
Forrosuelo was born in the municipality of Sindangan, Zamboanga del Norte. He played high school football for the junior team of Far Eastern University, the Baby Tamaraws, where he won several juniors titles. He would go on to play for the college team of FEU in 2019, though his stay was cut short due to the COVID-19 pandemic.

== Club career ==
=== Azkals Development Team ===
While still in college, he played club football for the Azkals Development Team of the PFL, making his debut in the 2021 Copa Paulino Alcantara. He would register one assist and was on the bench as the ADT lost in the final.

=== United City ===
During the pre-season transfer window, he moved to United City, where he became a fixture in defense in the club's campaigns in the PFL, Copa, and AFC Champions League. In the 2022 Copa Paulino Alcantara, he was a starter as United City won their first-ever title. However, his contract with the club ended in December as the club were forced to withdraw from the PFL due to financial issues.

=== Rajpracha ===
After United City, Forrosuelo was signed by Thai League 2 side Rajpracha, becoming one of the first Philippine-born football players to move to the country. However, he didn't feature in a first-team game for the club.

=== Davao Aguilas ===
Forrosuelo signed with former PFL side Davao Aguilas in the summer of 2023 as the club prepared for their return to club football with the 2023 Copa Paulino Alcantara. Davao and Forrosuelo would go on a fairytale run to the final, with Davao becoming the first-ever non-league side to make the Copa Paulino Alcantara Final.

== International career ==
=== Philippines U19 ===
While still with FEU's juniors team, Forrosuelo was called up to the Philippine National U-19 team in 2018 in preparation for the AFF U19 Championship. He made his debut in the opening match, a 2–1 win against Singapore.

=== Philippines U23 ===
Forrosuelo was later called up to the Philippine National U-23 team a year later for the 2019 Merlion Cup, starting both teams' matches as they lost to Singapore and Indonesia. He would make a brief return to the team 3 years later, featuring in the 2022 AFF U23 Championship.

=== Philippines ===
In 2022, Forrosuelo got his first call-up to the Philippine senior team in a 4–1 friendly win over Timor-Leste. He would be called up again for the 2022 AFF Championship, but couldn't make the cut due to injury.

== Honours ==
United City

- Copa Paulino Alcantara: 2022
