= 2021 Copa Paulino Alcantara =

3rd season of the Copa Paulino Alcantara

Tournament details
- Country: Philippines
- Dates: November 7–19
- Teams: 5

Final positions
- Champions: Kaya–Iloilo (2nd title)

Tournament statistics
- Matches played: 8
- Goals scored: 23 (2.88 per match)
- Top goal scorer(s): Jarvey Gayoso (6 goals)

The 2021 Copa Paulino Alcantara was the third edition of the Copa Paulino Alcantara, the domestic football cup competition of the Philippines. United City (then called Ceres–Negros) won the previous edition in 2019, but withdrew from the 2021 edition. Kaya–Iloilo won their second title by defeating the Azkals Development Team 1–0 in the final. All matches were played at the PFF National Training Center in Carmona, Cavite.

== Scheduling ==
The Copa Paulino Alcantara was not held in the 2020 season due to the COVID-19 pandemic, with the league tournament held under a bubble format.

There were initially plans to hold the cup tournament earlier in the year, but it was cancelled in March 2021 (along with several postponements to the 2021 Philippines Football League). The tournament was revived once again in October 2021, after the league season was cancelled, and now scheduled to take place during November 7–19.

== Participating clubs ==
All six clubs in the 2020 Philippines Football League were eligible to participate in the tournament. Cebu which was given a provisional license and also eligible to join. However the PFF added that only clubs willing to spend for their participation would take part in the tournament. Maharlika Manila decided not to enter. United City withdrew after the draw due to an undisclosed legal dispute filed against the club when it was still Ceres–Negros and under a different management. The club withdrew since it believe it could affect the nominations of the other clubs to the 2022 AFC Cup had they entered.

Philippines Football League
4 teams from the 2020 season + 1 new club
- Azkals Development Team
- Kaya FC–Iloilo
- Mendiola
- Stallion Laguna
- ~~United City~~
- Dynamic Herb Cebu (joined in 2021)

== Format ==
=== Competition ===
The Copa Paulino Alcantara will consist of two rounds; the group stage and the knock-out stage. For the group stage, the six participating clubs were divided into two groups of three. The top two teams from each group will advance to the semifinals. There will also be a third place play-off for the losing semifinalists. The third placed teams in the group stage were supposed to play-off in the Plate final, but this was cancelled due to an absence of a third team in Group A after United City's withdrawal.

The winners will qualify for the 2022 AFC Champions League qualifying play-offs. Kaya–Iloilo, Mendiola and Stallion Laguna are eligible to qualify as holders of an AFC club license.

The tiebreaker used for the tournament is as follows: lowest number of red cards accumulated, lowest number of yellow cards or through a coin toss.

=== Draw ===
The draw was held on October 27, 2021.

Pot 1 (Seeded teams)	Pot 2 (Non-seeded teams)	
United City (PFL champions); Kaya–Iloilo (PFL Runners-up)	Azkals Development Team; Dynamic Herb Cebu	Mendiola 1991; Stallion Laguna

== Group stage ==
=== Group A ===
Pos	Team	Pld	W	D	L	GF	GA	GD	Pts	Qualification
1	Stallion Laguna	1	1	0	0	1	0	+1	3	Semi-finals
2	Dynamic Herb Cebu	1	0	0	1	0	1	−1	0	Semi-finals
3	United City	0	0	0	0	0	0	0	0	Withdrew

Source: PFL

November 10, 2021 1	Stallion Laguna	1–0	Dynamic Herb Cebu	Carmona
19:30 UTC+8	Sy 19'	Report		Stadium: PFF National Training Center; Referee: Steve Suprecencia

=== Group B ===
Pos	Team	Pld	W	D	L	GF	GA	GD	Pts	Qualification
1	Kaya–Iloilo	2	2	0	0	8	0	+8	6	Semi-finals
2	Azkals Development Team	2	1	0	1	9	2	+7	3	Semi-finals
3	Mendiola 1991	2	0	0	2	0	15	−15	0	

Source: PFL

November 7, 2021 1	Kaya–Iloilo	2–0	Azkals Development Team	Carmona
19:30 UTC+8	Horikoshi 54'; Rota 70'	Report		Stadium: PFF National Training Center; Referee: Clifford Daypuyat

November 10, 2021 2	Mendiola 1991	0–6	Kaya–Iloilo	Carmona
16:00 UTC+8		Report	Bedic 11', 35'; Fujii 40'; Daniels 63'; Horikoshi 83'; Mitchell 90+2'	Stadium: PFF National Training Center; Referee: Mick Jon Pineda

November 13, 2021 3	Azkals Development Team	9–0	Mendiola 1991	Carmona
19:30 UTC+8	Gayoso 16' (pen.), 38', 52', 72' (pen.), 73'; Chung 29'; Rontini 34'; Diano 36'; Reyes 76'	Report		Stadium: PFF National Training Center; Referee: Mick Jon Pineda

== Knock-out stage ==
Semi-finals
A1	Stallion Laguna	1
B2	ADT	2
B1	Kaya–Iloilo	1
A2	Dynamic Herb Cebu	0

Final
W1	ADT	0
W2	Kaya–Iloilo	1
Third place
L1	Stallion Laguna	0(5)
L2	Dynamic Herb Cebu	0(4)

=== Semi-finals ===
November 16, 2021 Semi-final	Stallion Laguna	1–2 (a.e.t.)	Azkals Development Team	Carmona
16:00 UTC+8	Placito 53'	Report	Gayoso 66'; Gallantes 116'	Stadium: PFF National Training Center; Referee: Steve Suprecencia

November 16, 2021 Semi-final	Kaya–Iloilo	1–0	Dynamic Herb Cebu	Carmona
20:15 UTC+8	Bedic 86' (pen.)	Report		Stadium: PFF National Training Center; Referee: Mick Jon Pineda

=== Third place play-off ===
November 19, 2021 Third place	Stallion Laguna	0–0 (a.e.t.) (5–4 p)	Dynamic Herb Cebu	Carmona
16:00 UTC+8				Stadium: PFF National Training Center; Referee: Mick Jon Pineda
	Penalties
	Silva (penalty scored); Placito (penalty scored); Kim (penalty scored); Bedia (penalty scored); McDaniel (penalty scored)		(penalty scored) Gadia; (penalty scored) Sendra; (penalty scored) Dabao; (penalty missed) Corsame; (penalty scored) Cañas

=== Final ===
November 19, 2021 Championship	Azkals Development Team	0–1	Kaya–Iloilo	Carmona
19:45 UTC+8			Daniels 47'	Stadium: PFF National Training Center; Referee: Clifford Daypuyat

== Top scorers ==
Team eliminated / inactive for this round.

Rank	Player	Team	MD1	MD2	SF	3P	F	Total
1	(Philippines) Jarvey Gayoso	ADT		5	1			6
2	(Philippines) Jovin Bedic	Kaya–Iloilo		2	1			3
3	(Philippines) Kenshiro Daniels	Kaya–Iloilo		1			1	2
3	(Japan) Daizo Horikoshi	Kaya–Iloilo	1	1				2
5	(Philippines) Dennis Chung	ADT		1				1
5	(Philippines) Mar Diano	ADT		1				1
5	(Japan) Ryo Fujii	Kaya–Iloilo		1				1
5	(Philippines) Yrick Gallantes	ADT			1			1
5	(Trinidad and Tobago) Carlyle Mitchell	Kaya–Iloilo		1				1
5	(United States) Abraham Placito	Stallion Laguna			1			1
5	(Philippines) Sandro Reyes	ADT		1				1
5	(Philippines) Simone Rota	Kaya–Iloilo	1					1
5	(Philippines) Christian Rontini	ADT		1				1
5	(Senegal) Abou Sy	Stallion Laguna	1					1

== Awards ==
Award	Winner	Club
Golden Ball	(Philippines) Jovin Bedic	Kaya–Iloilo
Golden Boot	(Philippines) Jarvey Gayoso	ADT
Golden Glove	(Philippines) Louie Casas	Kaya–Iloilo
