= 2019 Albirex Niigata Singapore FC season =

Albirex Niigata (S)
2019 season
- Chairman: Daisuke Korenaga
- Head coach: (Japan) Keiji Shigetomi
- Stadium: Jurong East Stadium
- Singapore Premier League: 4th
- Singapore Cup: Group Stage
- Charity Shield: Runners-up

The 2019 season was Albirex Niigata Singapore FC's 16th consecutive season in the top flight of Singapore football and in the Singapore Premier League, having joined the league in 2004. Along with the 2019 Singapore Premier League, the club also competed in the Singapore Cup and the Singapore League Cup. They were the defending champions.

== Key events ==
=== Pre-season ===
==== Players and Staff ====
1. On 11/12/2018, the club announced the former assistant, Keiji Shigetomi, as its new coach for the season.

==== New Sponsor ====
1. On 18/12/2018, the club announced its first “Jersey Partner” with Reeracoen.
2. On 20/12/2018, Bridgestone Tyre Sales Singapore Pte Ltd announced that they have come on board joining with Albirex Jersey Partner for 2019 season!
3. On 27/12/2018, Lensmode announced that they have come on board joining with Albirex Jersey Partner for 2019 season!

== Squad ==
=== S.League squad ===
As of 14 December 2017.

Squad No.	Name	Nationality	Date of birth (age)	Previous club	Contract Start	Contract end
Goalkeepers
1	Kengo Fukudome ^{>30}	(Japan)	14 May 1987 (age 39)	(Japan) Azul Claro Numazu	2019	
21	Hyrulnizam Juma'at	(Singapore)	14 November 1986 (age 40)	(Singapore) Warriors FC	2019	
22	Yusuke Kawagoe	(Japan)	28 April 1999 (age 27)	Japan Soccer College	2019	
Defenders
2	Gerald Ang	(Singapore)	10 July 1996 (age 30)	(Singapore) SAFSA (NFL)	2019	2019
3	Shuhei Sasahara	(Japan)	22 November 1996 (age 29)	(Japan) Tokai University	2018	
4	Naruki Takahashi	(Japan)	17 December 1998 (age 27)	(Japan) Montedio Yamagata	2019	
7	Kaishu Yamazaki	(Japan)	12 July 1997 (age 29)	(Japan) Iwaki FC	2018	
15	Kodai Sumikawa	(Japan)	9 April 1999 (age 27)	(Japan) Teikyo Nagaoka High School	2018	
16	Souta Sugiyama	(Japan)	7 November 2000 (age 26)	(Japan) Kaishi Gakuen JSC	2019	
18	Gamu Tasaka	(Japan)	23 July 1999 (age 27)	Japan Soccer College	2019	
19	Shunsuke Fukuda	(Japan)	3 March 1999 (age 27)	Japan Soccer College	2019	
	Tatsuya Morita	(Japan)	27 June 1996 (age 30)	(Brazil) Santos FC B (Trainee)	2019	
Midfielders
5	Firas Irwan	(Singapore)	1 January 2001 (age 25)	(Singapore) NFA U18	2019	2019
6	Shoki Ohara	(Japan)	28 August 1999 (age 27)	(Japan) Mito HollyHock	2019	
10	Kyoga Nakamura (Captain)	(Japan)	25 April 1996 (age 30)	(Japan) YSCC Yokohama	2019	
14	Ryo Nakano	(Japan)	27 June 1999 (age 27)	(Japan) FC Tiamo Hirakata	2019	
17	Noor Akid Nordin ^{<23}	(Singapore)	28 October 1996 (age 30)	(Singapore) Balestier Khalsa	2019	
20	Daichi Tanabe	(Japan)	26 January 2001 (age 25)	Japan Soccer College	2019	
23	Daniel Martens	(Singapore)	25 February 1999 (age 27)	(Singapore) Hougang United U19	2019	2019
24	Zamani Zamri	(Singapore)	31 May 2001 (age 25)	(Singapore) F-17 Academy	2019	2019
25	Yosuke Nakagawa	(Japan)	28 April 1998 (age 28)	(Japan) Mito HollyHock	2019	
Strikers
8	Daizo Horikoshi	(Japan)	14 September 1996 (age 30)	(Japan) Tokai University	2019	
9	Hiroyoshi Kamata	(Japan)	4 April 1997 (age 29)	(Japan) Albirex Niigata U18	2016	
11	Yoshikatsu Hiraga	(Japan)	8 October 1997 (age 29)	(Japan) Momoyama Gakuin University	2019	
13	Makito Hatanaka	(Japan)	7 June 1996 (age 30)	(Japan) Gainare Tottori	2019	

== Coaching staff ==
Position	Name
Head Coach	(Japan) Keiji Shigetomi
Coach	(Japan) Jun Hirabayashi
Coach	(Japan) Yuto Inabe
Goalkeeper Coach	(Australia) Scott Starr
Fitness Coach	(Singapore) Yi Fei
Team Manager	(Singapore) Matthew Sean
Physiotherapist	(Japan)
Kitman	(Singapore) Roy Krishnan

== Transfer ==
=== Pre-season transfer ===
==== In ====
Position	Player	Transferred From	Ref
Coach	(Japan) Keiji Shigetomi	Promoted	
GK	(Japan) Kengo Fukudome	(Japan) Azul Claro Numazu (J3)	
GK	(Singapore) Hyrulnizam Juma'at	(Singapore) Warriors FC	Free
GK	(Japan) Yusuke Kawagoe	Japan Soccer College	
DF	(Japan) Gamu Tasaka	Japan Soccer College	
DF	(Japan) Shunsuke Fukuda	Japan Soccer College	
DF	(Japan) Souta Sugiyama	(Japan) Kaishi Gakuen JSC	
DF	(Japan) Naruki Takahashi	(Japan) Montedio Yamagata (J2)	Season loan
DF	(Japan) Tatsuya Morita	(Brazil) Santos FC B (Trainee)	
DF	(Singapore) Gerald Ang	(Singapore) SAFSA	Undisclosed
MF	(Singapore) Zamani Zamri	(Singapore) F-17 Academy	Free
MF	(Singapore) Firas Irwan	(Singapore) NFA U18	Free
MF	(Singapore) Martens Daniel Jordan Rowsing	(Singapore) Hougang United U19	Season loan
MF	(Singapore) Noor Akid Nordin	(Singapore) Balestier Khalsa	Undisclosed
MF	(Japan) Kyoga Nakamura	(Japan) YSCC Yokohama (J3)	
MF	(Japan) Ryo Nakano	(Japan) FC Tiamo Hirakata (J6)	
MF	(Japan) Daichi Tanabe	Japan Soccer College	
MF	(Japan) Shoki Ohara	(Japan) Mito HollyHock (J2)	Season loan
FW	(Japan) Makito Hatanaka	(Japan) Gainare Tottori (J3)	
FW	(Japan) Yoshikatsu Hiraga	(Japan) Momoyama Gakuin University	
FW	(Japan) Daizo Horikoshi	(Japan) Tokai University	

Note 1: Tatsuya Morita was released before the season start.

==== Out ====
Position	Player	Transferred To	Ref
Coach	(Japan) Kazuaki Yoshinaga	(Japan) Albirex Niigata	
GK	(Japan) Yosuke Nozawa	(Japan) Albirex Niigata	
GK	(Singapore) Shahul Rayyan	(Singapore) Warriors FC	
GK	(Japan) Taiki Itsukaichi	Free Agent	
DF	(Japan) Riku Moriyasu	(Japan) FC Tiamo Hirakata (J6)	
DF	(Japan) Kazuki Sumiishi	Free Agent	
DF	(Japan) Ryujiro Yamanaka	(Japan) Okinawa SV (J5)	Free
MF	(Japan) Daiki Asaoka	(Japan) Tokyo United FC (J5)	
MF	(Japan) Wataru Murofushi	(Canada) York 9 FC (T1)	Free
MF	(Japan) Ryuji Yamauchi	Free Agent	
MF	(Japan) Kazuya Kojima	Free Agent	
MF	(Japan) Ryutaro Shibanoki	Free Agent	
MF	(Singapore) Adam Swandi	(Singapore) Home United	Free
FW	(Japan) Shuhei Hoshino	(South Korea) Busan TC (T3)	Free
FW	(Japan) Kenya Takahashi	Free Agent	
FW	(Japan) Taku Morinaga	(Montenegro) FK Rudar Pljevlja (T1)	
FW	(Japan) Ibuki Inoue	Free Agent	
FW	(Japan) Shun Kumagai	(Cambodia) National Police Commissary (T1)	Free

==== Retained ====
Position	Player	Ref
DF	(Japan) Kaishu Yamazaki	
DF	(Japan) Kodai Sumikawa	
DF	(Japan) Shuhei Sasahara	
MF	(Japan) Hiroyoshi Kamata	

==== Extension ====
Position	Player	Ref

=== Mid-season transfer ===
==== In ====
Position	Player	Transferred From	Ref
MF	(Japan) Yosuke Nakagawa	(Japan) Mito HollyHock	Season loan

== Friendly ==
=== Pre-Season Friendly ===
Win Draw Loss

2 February 2019 1	Albirex Niigata (S) (Singapore)	2–0	(Singapore) Hougang United	Jalan Besar Stadium
	Hiroyoshi Kamata 44'; Daizo Horikoshi 86'

7 February 2019 2	Albirex Niigata (S) (Singapore)	0–6	(Singapore) Hougang United	Hougang Stadium

13 February 2019 3	Albirex Niigata (S) (Singapore)	6–0	Singapore U19	Jalan Besar Stadium
	Kaishu Yamazaki 27', 49'; Makito Hatanaka 71'; Yoshikatsu Hiraga 77', 82'; Kyoga Nakamura 87'	Report

16 February 2019 4	Albirex Niigata (S) (Singapore)	0–4	(Singapore) Tampines Rovers	Our Tampines Hub
			Khairul Amri; Jordan Webb; Zehrudin Mehmedović; Shahdan Sulaiman (pen.)

=== In-Season Friendly ===
Tour of Myanmar (6 to 10 March)

7 March 2019 1	Myanmar U19	1–3	(Singapore) Albirex Niigata (S)
	Goal		Daizo Horikoshi 14'; Hiroyoshi Kamata 26', 78'

9 March 2019 2	Myanmar U22	0–0	(Singapore) Albirex Niigata (S)
		Report

== Team statistics ==
=== Appearances and goals ===
No.	Pos.	Player	Sleague		Singapore Cup		Charity Shield		Total	
No.	Pos.	Player	Apps.	Goals	Apps.	Goals	Apps.	Goals	Apps.	Goals
1	GK	(Japan) Kengo Fukudome	23	0	3	0	1	0	27	0
3	DF	(Japan) Shuhei Sasahara	20	0	3	0	0(1)	0	24	0
4	DF	(Japan) Naruki Takahashi	17(4)	1	0(2)	0	1	0	24	1
5	MF	(Singapore) Firas Irwan	8(1)	0	3	0	1	0	13	0
6	MF	(Japan) Shoki Ohara	21	2	3	0	1	0	25	2
7	DF	(Japan) Kaishu Yamazaki	24	3	3	0	1	0	28	3
8	FW	(Japan) Daizo Horikoshi	18(1)	6	3	2	1	0	23	8
9	FW	(Japan) Hiroyoshi Kamata	24	7	3	0	1	0	28	7
10	MF	(Japan) Kyoga Nakamura	23	7	3	0	1	0	27	7
11	FW	(Japan) Yoshikatsu Hiraga	1(20)	4	0(1)	0	0	0	22	4
13	FW	(Japan) Makito Hatanaka	0(6)	0	0(2)	0	0	0	8	0
14	MF	(Japan) Ryo Nakano	1(2)	0	0	0	1	0	4	0
15	DF	(Japan) Kodai Sumikawa	1(5)	0	0(1)	0	1	0	8	0
16	DF	(Japan) Souta Sugiyama	21(2)	1	3	0	0(1)	0	27	1
17	MF	(Singapore) Noor Akid Nordin	6	1	0	0	1	0	7	1
18	DF	(Japan) Gamu Tasaka	0(2)	0	0	0	0	0	2	0
19	DF	(Japan) Shunsuke Fukuda	0(2)	0	0	0	0	0	2	0
20	MF	(Japan) Daichi Tanabe	8(12)	0	0(3)	1	0	0	23	1
21	GK	(Singapore) Hyrulnizam Juma'at	1	0	0	0	0	0	1	0
23	MF	(Singapore) Martens Daniel	13	1	2	0	0	0	15	1
24	MF	(Singapore) Zamani Zamri	20	1	1	0	1	0	22	1
25	MF	(Japan) Yosuke Nakagawa	14	2	3	0	0	0	17	2

== Competitions ==
=== Overview ===
Competition	Record							
Competition	P	W	D	L	GF	GA	GD	Win %
Singapore Premier League	24	12	5	7	36	25	+11	50.00
Singapore Cup	3	1	0	2	3	3	+0	33.33
Total	27	13	5	9	39	28	+11	48.15

=== Charity Shield ===
Win Draw Loss

23 February 2019 Charity Shield	Albirex Niigata (S) (Singapore)	0–0 (4–5 p)	(Singapore) Home United	Jalan Besar Stadium
18:00	Souta Sugiyama (yellow card) 85'		Izzdin Shafiq (yellow card) 60'; Hami Syahin (yellow card) 77'	Referee: G. Letchman
	Penalties
	Kyoga Nakamura (penalty scored); Hiroyoshi Kamata (penalty missed); Daizo Horikoshi (penalty scored); Ryo Nakano (penalty missed); Kaishu Yamazaki (penalty scored); Shoki Ohara (penalty scored); Naruki Takahashi (penalty missed)		Adam Swandi (penalty scored); Aqhari Abdullah (penalty missed); Faritz Abdul Hameed (penalty missed); Izzdin Shafiq (penalty scored); Abdil Qaiyyim Mutalib (penalty scored); Faizal Roslan (penalty scored); Hami Syahin (penalty scored)

=== Singapore Premier League ===
Win Draw Loss

2 March 2019 1	Geylang International (Singapore)	1–0	(Singapore) Albirex Niigata (S)	Our Tampines Hub
	Yuki Ichikawa 86'; Danish Irfan (yellow card) 41'; Umar Akhbar (yellow card) 47'; Zainol Gulam (yellow card) 90'	Report		Referee: Jansen Foo

15 March 2019 2	Albirex Niigata (S) (Singapore)	0–0	Brunei DPMM	Jurong East Stadium
	Shuhei Sasahara (yellow card) 90+1'	Report	Azwan Ali Rahman (yellow card) 24'; Hendra Azam Idris (yellow card) 38'; Najib Tarif (yellow card) 45' (yellow-red card) 53'; Charlie Clough (yellow card) 68'	Referee: Farhan Mohamed

29 March 2019 3	Tampines Rovers (Singapore)	0–0	(Singapore) Albirex Niigata (S)	Our Tampines Hub
	Irwan Shah (yellow card) 49'		Kodai Sumikawa (yellow card) 90'	Referee: Juherman Zaiton

6 April 2019 4	Albirex Niigata (S) (Singapore)	2–1	(Singapore) Balestier Khalsa	Jurong East Stadium
	Shoki Ohara 85'; Yoshikatsu Hiraga 90+2'; Daizo Horikoshi (yellow card) 71'; Kyoga Nakamura (yellow card) 72'		Huzaifah Aziz 4' (yellow card) 75'; Akbar Shah (yellow card) 22'; Fazli Shafie (yellow card) 25'; Raihan Rahman (yellow card) 68'	Referee: Ahmad A'Qashah

13 April 2019 5	Warriors FC (Singapore)	1–2	(Singapore) Albirex Niigata (S)	Jurong East Stadium
	Jonathan Béhé 37'; Kento Fukuda (yellow card) 53'; Faizal Raffi (yellow card) 64'		Daizo Horikoshi 25'; Kyoga Nakamura (penalty missed); Hiroyoshi Kamata 49'	Referee: Nathan Chan

21 April 2019 6	Albirex Niigata (S) (Singapore)	2–1	(Singapore) Young Lions FC	Jurong East Stadium
	Naruki Takahashi 14'; Hiroyoshi Kamata 90+5'; Kengo Fukudome (yellow card) 30'; Kyoga Nakamura (yellow card) 88'		Haiqal Pashia 31' (pen.) (yellow card) 76'; Syed Akmal (yellow card) 82'; Syahrul Sazali (yellow card) 90+7'	Referee: Ahmad A'Qashah

24 April 2019 7	Hougang United (Singapore)	4–2	(Singapore) Albirex Niigata (S)	Jalan Besar Stadium
	Faris Ramli 9', 28'; Nikesh Singh Sidhu 56'; Shahfiq Ghani 70'		Daizo Horikoshi 67'; Yoshikatsu Hiraga 90+2'	Referee: Muhammad Zulfiqar

27 April 2019 8	Albirex Niigata (S) (Singapore)	4–0	(Singapore) Home United	Jurong East Stadium
	Kyoga Nakamura 2' (pen.) 45+4' (yellow card) 66'; Daizo Horikoshi 22'; Martens Daniel 38'; Souta Sugiyama (yellow card) 67'		Hami Syahin (yellow card) 52'; Adam Swandi (yellow card) 74'	Referee: Edwin Lee / G. Letchman

5 May 2019 9	Albirex Niigata (S) (Singapore)	2–0	(Singapore) Geylang International	Jurong East Stadium
	Kyoga Nakamura 85' 90'		Umar Akhbar (yellow card) 54'; Darren Teh (yellow card) 62'; Noor Ariff (yellow card) 70' (yellow-red card) 79'	Referee: Jansen Foo

24 May 2019 10	Albirex Niigata (S) (Singapore)	0–0	Brunei DPMM	Jurong East Stadium
			Yura Indera Putera Yunos (yellow card) 70'	Referee: Juherman Zaiton

15 June 2019 11	Albirex Niigata (S) (Singapore)	3–1	(Singapore) Tampines Rovers	Jurong East Stadium
	Hiroyoshi Kamata 5'; Daizo Horikoshi 41'; Shah Shahiran 69' (o.g.); Shoki Ohara (yellow card) 36'; Kyoga Nakamura (yellow card) 70'		Shahdan Sulaiman 81'; Joel Chew (yellow card) 35'; Zehrudin Mehmedovic (yellow card) 55'; Zulfadhmi Suzliman (yellow card) 70'; Irwan Shah (yellow card) 75'; Yasir Hanapi (yellow card) 82'	Referee: G. Letchman

21 June 2019 12	Balestier Khalsa (Singapore)	1–3	(Singapore) Albirex Niigata (S)	Bishan Stadium
	Sime Zuzul 1'; Huzaifah Aziz (yellow card) 33'; Ahmad Syahir (yellow card) 45+2'; Raihan Rahman (yellow card) 58'; Nurullah Hussein (yellow card) 80'		Kaishu Yamazaki 75'; Noor Akid Nordin 78' (yellow card) 25'; Yosuke Nakagawa 90+4'	Referee: Juherman Zaiton

30 June 2019 13	Albirex Niigata (S) (Singapore)	1–0	(Singapore) Warriors FC	Bishan Stadium
	Hiroyoshi Kamata 30'; Naruki Takahashi (yellow card) 54'; Kengo Fukudome (yellow card) 83'		Daniel Shafiq (yellow card) 17'	Referee: Muhammad Taqi

6 July 2019 14	Young Lions FC (Singapore)	1–2	(Singapore) Albirex Niigata (S)	Jalan Besar Stadium
	Syahrul Sazali 56'; Joshua Pereira (yellow card) 17'; Haiqal Pashia (yellow card) 34' (yellow-red card) 90+4'; Abdul Rasaq Akeem (yellow card) 58'; Syahrul Sazali (red card) 89'		Kyoga Nakamura 19'; Yoshikatsu Hiraga 62'; Sota Sugiyama (yellow card) 55'	Referee: Syahir Ahmadi

13 July 2019 15	Albirex Niigata (S) (Singapore)	1–2	(Singapore) Hougang United	Jurong East Stadium
	Zamani Zamri 53'; Kyoga Nakamura (yellow card) 71'		Stipe Plazibat 25' 31'; Nikesh Singh Sidhu (yellow card) 5'; Timothy David Yeo (yellow card) 29'; Ridhuan Barudin (yellow card) 86'	Referee: Farhan Mohd

18 July 2019 16 (Rescheduled)	Home United (Singapore)	3–3	(Singapore) Albirex Niigata (S)	Bishan Stadium
	Amiruldin Asraf 32'; Song Ui-young 81'; Shahril Ishak 84'; Aqhari Abdullah (yellow card) 75'		Yosuke Nakagawa 36' (yellow card) 63'; Hiroyoshi Kamata 56'; Kyoga Nakamura 79'	Referee: Muhammad Zulfiqar

26 July 2019 17	Geylang International (Singapore)	1–0	(Singapore) Albirex Niigata (S)	Our Tampines Hub
	Zikos Vasileios Chua 90+5'; Umar Akhbar (yellow card) 24'; Yuki Ichikawa (yellow card) 37'; Christopher Van Huizen (yellow card) 56'		Sota Sugiyama (yellow card) 12'; Daichi Tanabe (yellow card) 76'; Kyoga Nakamura (yellow card) 78'; Makito Hatanaka (yellow card) 85'	Referee: Lim Liang Yi

10 September 2019 18 (Rescheduled)	Brunei DPMM	2–0	(Singapore) Albirex Niigata (S)	Hassanal Bolkiah National Stadium
	Razimie Ramlli 67'; Adi 77'

18 August 2019 19 (Rescheduled)	Tampines Rovers (Singapore)	2–0	(Singapore) Albirex Niigata (S)	Our Tampines Hub
	Shadan Sulaiman 2'; Jordan Webb 22'			Referee: Farhan Mohamed

18 September 2019 20 (Rescheduled)	Albirex Niigata (S) (Singapore)	2–0	(Singapore) Balestier Khalsa	Jurong East Stadium
	Hiroyoshi Kamata 19' (pen.); Kyoga Nakamura 90+3'

31 August 2019 21	Warriors FC (Singapore)	2–1	(Singapore) Albirex Niigata (S)	Jurong East Stadium
	Kento Fukuda 40'; Jonathan Béhé 59'		Daizo Horikoshi 58'	Referee: Muhammad Taqi

15 September 2019 22	Albirex Niigata (S) (Singapore)	4–1	(Singapore) Young Lions FC	Jurong East Stadium
	Kaishu Yamazaki 44' 53'; Shoki Ohara 57'; Daizo Horikoshi 77'		Ilhan Fandi 2'	Referee: Jansen Foo

27 August 2019 23 (Rescheduled)	Hougang United (Singapore)	1–1	(Singapore) Albirex Niigata (S)	Jalan Besar Stadium
	Faris Ramli 40'		Souta Sugiyama 20'	Referee: Juherman Zaiton

29 September 2019 24	Albirex Niigata (S) (Singapore)	1–0	(Singapore) Home United	Jurong East Stadium
	Hiroyoshi Kamata 15'			Referee: Nathan Chan

Pos	Team	Pld	W	D	L	GF	GA	GD	Pts	Qualification or relegation
2	Tampines Rovers	24	12	8	4	52	29	+23	44	Qualification for AFC Champions League preliminary round 1
3	Hougang United	24	13	4	7	58	45	+13	43	Qualification for AFC Cup group stage
4	Albirex Niigata (S) (Note: The two foreign clubs – Albirex Niigata (S) and DPMM – as well as the Football Association of Singapore (FAS) under-21 team, Young Lions, are ineligible for any AFC competition spots.)	24	12	5	7	36	25	+11	41	
5	Geylang International	24	10	3	11	41	48	−7	33	
6	Home United	24	9	3	12	34	46	−12	30	

Source: Singapore Premier League
Rules for classification: 1) points; 2) goal difference; 3) number of goals scored; 4) number of wins

=== Singapore Cup ===
Win Draw Loss

25 September 2019 Match 1	Albirex Niigata (S) (Singapore)	1–2	(Singapore) Hougang United	Jurong East Stadium
	Daizo Horikoshi 29'		Kong Ho-won 28'; Faris Ramli 90' (pen.)	Referee: G. Letchman

19 October 2019 Match 2	Geylang International (Singapore)	0–2	(Singapore) Albirex Niigata (S)	Our Tampines Hub
			Daizo Horikoshi 81'; Daichi Tanabe 85'	Referee: Abirami Naidu

23 October 2019 Match 3	Albirex Niigata (S) (Singapore)	0–1	Brunei DPMM	Jurong East Stadium
			Azwan Ali Rahman 12'	Referee: Muhammad Zulfiqar

== See also ==
- 2014 Albirex Niigata Singapore FC season
- 2015 Albirex Niigata Singapore FC season
- 2017 Albirex Niigata Singapore FC season
- 2018 Albirex Niigata Singapore FC season
