= Park Yi-young =

South Korean footballer

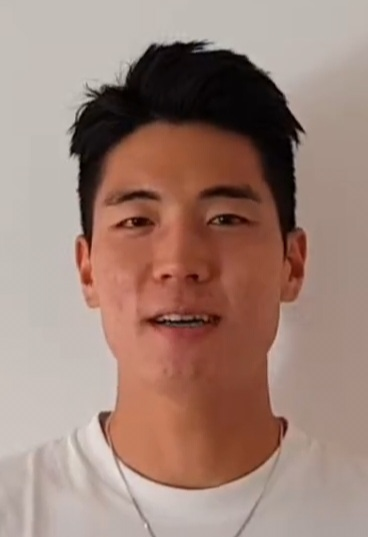

Personal information
- Date of birth: 29 June 1994 (age 32)
- Place of birth: Seoul, South Korea
- Height: 1.86 m (6 ft 1 in)
- Positions: Center-back; right-back

Team information
- Current team: Negeri Sembilan
- Number: 4

Senior career*
Years	Team	Apps	(Gls)
2013–2014	Team Socceroo	21	(5)
2014	Pachanga Diliman		
2015–2024	FC St. Pauli II	104	(3)
2017–2019	FC St. Pauli	25	(1)
2020–2021	→ Türkgücü München (loan)	28	(0)
2024	Kaya-Iloilo	13	(1)
2024–2026	Phnom Penh Crown	40	(1)
2026–	Negeri Sembilan	0	(0)
- * Club domestic league appearances and goals as of 18 May 2026

Park Yi-young (Korean: 박이영; born 29 June 1994) is a South Korean professional footballer who plays as a center-back or right-back for Malaysia Super League club Negeri Sembilan.

== Club career ==
=== Team Socceroo ===
Park was going to join a university, but he left for the Philippines after hearing the news that Philippine football clubs were recruiting South Korean based players. In 2013, he joined Team Socceroo, a team of Philippine second division, and contributed to their league title. The next year, he scored five goals and provided six assists during 21 games in the first division.

=== Pachanga Diliman ===
Park moved to Pachanga Diliman in July 2014 and participated in friendly games after the league season ended.

=== St. Pauli ===
In 2015, Park was eliminated from tryouts for Marítimo and Teplička nad Váhom, challenging Europe, but succeeded in joining St. Pauli. He established himself as the first team's right back in the second half of the 2017–18 season. On 6 May 2018, he scored the crucial winning goal against Arminia Bielefeld which prevented his team's relegation. In August 2018, he agreed a contract extension until June 2022.

==== loan to Türkgücü München ====
For the 2020-21 season, he moved on loan to 3. Liga side to Türkgücü München.

=== Kaya–Iloilo ===
On 7 February 2024, Park moved back to the Philippines now with league champions Kaya-Iloilo for the Philippines Football League 2024 season.

In July 2024, Park became a victim of six women pickpocketers in Bonifacio Global City. He lost some cash but recovered his wallet.

=== Phnom Penh Crown ===
In December 2024, he signed for Phnom Penh Crown in the Cambodian Premier League.

== Career statistics ==
As of 30 November 2022

Appearances and goals by club, season and competition
Club	Season	League			National Cup		League Cup		Continental		Other		Total	
Club	Season	Division	Apps	Goals	Apps	Goals	Apps	Goals	Apps	Goals	Apps	Goals	Apps	Goals
Team Socceroo	2013	UFL Division 2	—		—		—		—		—			
Team Socceroo	2014	UFL Division 1	21	5	—		—		—		—		21	5
Team Socceroo	Total		21	5	—		—		—		—		21	5
Pachanga Diliman	2014	UFL Division 1	—		—		—		—		—			
St. Pauli II	2015–16	Regionalliga Nord	22	1	—		—		—		—		22	1
St. Pauli II	2016–17	Regionalliga Nord	26	0	—		—		—		—		26	0
St. Pauli II	2017–18	Regionalliga Nord	6	0	—		—		—		—		6	0
St. Pauli II	2018–19	Regionalliga Nord	9	0	—		—		—		—		9	0
St. Pauli II	2019–20	Regionalliga Nord	1	0	—		—		—		—		1	0
St. Pauli II	2021-22	Regionalliga Nord	22	1	—		—		—		—		22	1
St. Pauli II	2022-23	Regionalliga Nord	18	1	—		—		—		—		18	1
St. Pauli II	Total		104	3	—		—		—		—		104	3
St. Pauli	2016–17	2. Bundesliga	2	0	—		—		—		—		2	0
St. Pauli	2017–18	2. Bundesliga	15	1	—		—		—		—		15	1
St. Pauli	2018–19	2. Bundesliga	7	0	0	0	—		—		—		7	0
St. Pauli	2019–20	2. Bundesliga	1	0	0	0	—		—		—		1	0
St. Pauli	Total		25	1	0	0	—		—		—		25	1
Türkgücü München (loan)	2020–21	3. Liga	28	0	0	0	—		—		—		28	0
Türkgücü München (loan)	Total		28	0	0	0	—		—		—		28	0
Kaya–Iloilo	2024	PFL	13	1	0	0	0	0	0	0	0	0	13	1
Kaya–Iloilo	2024–25	PFL	6	0	0	0	0	0	6 (Note: ACL Two)	0	1 (Note: ASEAN Club Championship)	0	13	0
Kaya–Iloilo	Total		19	1	0	0	0	0	6	0	1	0	26	1
Phnom Penh Crown	2024–25	Cambodian Premier League	13	1	0	0	0	0	0	0	0	0	13	1
Phnom Penh Crown	2025–26	Cambodian Premier League	27	0	0	0	0	0	6 (Note: AFC Challenge League)	0	1 (Note: Cambodian Super Cup)	0	33	0
Phnom Penh Crown	Total		40	1	0	0	0	0	6	0	1	0	47	1
Negeri Sembilan	2026–27	Malaysia Super League	0	0	0	0	0	0	—		—		0	0
Negeri Sembilan	Total		0	0	0	0	0	0	—		—		0	0
Career total			237	11	0	0	0	0	23	0	4	0	264	11

== Honours ==
=== Club ===
Team Socceroo

- UFL Division 2: 2013

==== Kaya–Iloilo ====
- Philippines Football League: 2024

==== Phnom Penh Crown ====
- Hun Sen Cup: 2024-25
