= Rico Andes =

Filipino footballer (born 1998)

Personal information
- Full name: Rico Ofredo Andes
- Date of birth: 14 March 1998 (age 28)
- Place of birth: Magallanes, Sorsogon, Philippines
- Height: 1.75 m (5 ft 9 in)
- Position: Striker

Team information
- Current team: Manila Digger
- Number: 14

Youth career
- 2014–2015: FEU Diliman

College career
Years	Team	Apps	(Gls)
2015–2018	Far Eastern University		(17)
2019–2020	National University	2	(0)

Senior career*
Years	Team	Apps	(Gls)
2022–2023	Dynamic Herb Cebu	2	(0)
2024–2025	Loyola	14	(9)
2025–2026	Dynamic Herb Cebu	7	(5)
2026	Pattani	5	(2)
2026–	Manila Digger	6	(4)

International career^{‡}
2019	Philippines U23	2	(0)
- * Club domestic league appearances and goals as of 22:23, 8 November 2026 (UTC) ‡ National team caps and goals as of 10 January 2026

Rico Ofredo Andes (born 14 March 1998) is a Filipino professional footballer who plays as a striker for Philippines Football League club Manila Digger. He has also represented the Philippines at the under-23 level.

== Career ==
=== Youth career ===
Andes was born in Magallanes in the province of Sorsogon. In high school, he played for the youth team of Far Eastern University, the Baby Tamaraws. He also played for FEU at the senior level in the UAAP, scoring eight goals in his rookie year. He would lead FEU to the final in Season 79, scoring against UP in the semifinals.

In 2019, Andes transferred to National University. He made two appearances in Season 82, but the season was cut short due to the COVID-19 pandemic. Andes would forgo his last season of eligibility to play professionally.

=== Dynamic Herb Cebu ===
In August 2022, Andes signed for Dynamic Herb Cebu in the Philippines Football League. However, instead of his position at striker, he was listed as a defender. He made his debut in a 4–3 win over Stallion Laguna, but made only two appearances for the Gentle Giants before being let go in early 2023.

=== Loyola ===
Andes was signed by Loyola ahead of the 2024–25 season of the PFL, where he shifted back to the striker position. He scored on his debut in a 4–1 loss to Maharlika. He would end up as one of the top scorers that season, scoring nine goals in 14 games.

=== Return to Cebu ===
In August 2025, Andes rejoined Cebu during the club's preparations for the ASEAN Club Championship. He scored in both legs against Kasuka of Brunei to bring Cebu to the group stage, scoring in a home game against Selangor. He also proved important for the club in the PFL, scoring a late winner against Stallion and racking up five goals in seven games.

=== Pattani ===
Andes signed for Thai League 2 club Pattani on 15 January 2026.

Andes made his league debut for Pattani later that season, and on 4 March 2026, he scored his first goals for the club, netting twice in a 4–2 victory against Chiangmai United. His brace was widely regarded as his breakthrough performance in the league and contributed significantly to Pattani's competitive campaign in the 2025–26 season.

=== Manila Digger ===
After a stint overseas, Andes signed with defending PFL champions Manila Digger ahead of the 2026–27 season.

== International career ==
=== Philippines U23 ===
Before the 2019 AFF U-22 Youth Championship, Andes was called up to the national team for the first time, representing the U-23 team. He made his debut in a 2–1 loss to Vietnam, coming on in the 79th minute for Ray Sanciangco.

== Career statistics ==
As of match played 18 November 2026

Appearances and goals by club, season and competition
Club	Season	League			League cup (Note: Includes Thai League Cup)		Asia		Other		Total	
Club	Season	Division	Apps	Goals	Apps	Goals	Apps	Goals	Apps	Goals	Apps	Goals
Dynamic Herb Cebu	2022–23	Philippines Football League	2	0	–		–		–		2	0
Loyola	2024–25	Philippines Football League	14	9	–		–		–		14	9
Dynamic Herb Cebu	2025–26	Philippines Football League	7	5	–		–		4 (Note: Appearances in ASEAN Club Championship)	4	11	9
Pattani	2025–26	Thai League 2	5	2	2	0	–		–		7	2
Manila Digger	2026–27	Philippines Football League	6	4	–		1 (Note: Appearance in AFC Challenge League)	0	3 (Note: Appearances in ASEAN Club Championship)	0	10	4
Career total			34	20	2	0	1	0	7	4	44	20
