= 2021 Philippines Football League =

Cancelled 5th season of the Philippines Football League

Philippines Football League
- Season: 2021
- Dates: October 27, 2021 (latest scheduled start date)
- Champions: None awarded

The 2021 Philippines Football League (known as The Philippines Football League brought to you by Qatar Airways for sponsorship reasons) was to be the fifth season of Philippines Football League (PFL), professional football league of the Philippines. However, the season was canceled due to the COVID-19 pandemic.

== Cancellation ==
The league's 2021 season was scheduled to kick off on August 21, 2021, but was postponed due to the implementation of enhanced community quarantine in Metro Manila and nearby provinces. It was postponed again for several times. The latest schedule for the season's start date was on October 27, 2021, provided that Cavite is under general community quarantine by October 16 and there are at least six confirmed participating clubs.

The 2021 season was canceled on October 22, 2021, and it was announced that the league cup tournament, 2021 Copa Paulino Alcantara, would be held in its place. It will start on November 7, 2021. The organization of the Copa Paulino Alcantara was previously uncertain, having not been held during the previous season.

== Stadium ==
Carmona, Cavite
PFF National Training Center
Capacity: 1,200
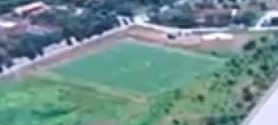
Location of the PFF National Training Center

Like previously, all games of 2021 season were planned to be held at the PFF National Training Center in Carmona, Cavite, under a close-circuit format due to prevailing COVID-19 pandemic. Biñan Football Stadium in Biñan, Laguna is being considered as a potential second venue.

== Teams ==
Cebu F.C. was given a provisional club license, which would have allowed the club to debut in the now canceled 2021 season. Laos and Rapids F.C. from Cagayan de Oro were the other applicant clubs.

=== Personnel and kits ===
Team	Head coach	Captain	Kit manufacturer	Sponsors
Azkals Development Team	(Republic of Ireland) Scott Cooper	(Philippines) Jarvey Gayoso	(Spain) Kelme	PHSD, Chooks-to-Go
Dynamic Herb Cebu	(Philippines) Oliver Colina	(Philippines) Evren Tasci	(Philippines) RAD Apparel	Dynamic Herb Sports, The Green Table, Tigertek Sports, Pocari Sweat, My Pinoy Teleserye, Borromeo Bros. Estate, Inc.
Kaya–Iloilo	TBD	(Philippines) Jovin Bedic	(Philippines) LGR	LBC, Fitness First
Maharlika Manila	(Philippines) Arvin Soliman	(Spain) Joaco Cañas	(Philippines) Gameville Sportswear	Philam Life, Reparil Ice-Spray, Arepa Nootropics
Mendiola 1991	(Philippines) Dan Padernal	(Philippines) Ashley Flores	(Indonesia) FAT	Penson and Company, Focus Athletics, Mr. Swabber, Best Diagnostic Corporation
Stallion Laguna	(Philippines) Ernest Nierras	(Philippines) Ruben Doctora	(Philippines) Cutz Apparel	Giligan's Restaurant, Pi Tracer, Airlock389, TANIS, South Coast Industrial Door Inc.
United City	(England) Jason Withe	(Philippines) Stephan Schröck	(Philippines) Chronos Athletics	Manila Regenerative Center, Midas Magnesium, Gatorade, BCDA, Allianz

=== Coaching changes ===
Team	Outgoing coach	Manner of departure	Date of vacancy	Incoming coach	Date of appointment
United City	(England) Trevor Morgan^{1}	Undisclosed	Undisclosed	(England) Jason Withe	31 March 2021
Kaya–Iloilo	(Japan) Yu Hoshide	Demoted to assistant manager	Undisclosed	(England) Graham Harvey^{1}	10 June 2021
Maharlika Manila	(Philippines) Roxy Dorlas	Undisclosed	Undisclosed	(Philippines) Arvin Soliman	30 July 2021
Kaya–Iloilo	(England) Graham Harvey^{1}	End of Contract	17 July 2021	(Japan) Yu Hoshide	October 2021

1. Named head coach for the 2020 season but was not able to coach the team. Withe was hired for the 2020 AFC Champions League due to having the appropriate pro coaching license to lead a club in the continental tournament.
1. Coached for the club at the 2020 AFC Champions League.

== Foreign players ==
A maximum of five foreigners are allowed per club, with four players of any nationality and a fifth coming from an AFC member nation. This is a change from the previous four seasons which followed the AFC's "3+1" rule. This resulted from an earlier press conference dubbed We Are PFL 2021, where managers of the clubs expressed a desire to increase the foreign quota from four to five.

Club	Players					Former Players
Azkals Development Team	None					None
Dynamic Herb Cebu	(Argentina) Ricardo Sendra	(Spain) Joaco Cañas				
Kaya–Iloilo	(Ghana) Patrick Asare	(Japan) Ryo Fujii	(Japan) Daizo Horikoshi	(Trinidad and Tobago) Carlyle Mitchell	(Japan) Masanari Omura	(Ghana) Emmanuel Osei
Maharlika Manila	(Cameroon) Henri Bandeken	(Democratic Republic of the Congo) Gary Epesso	(Cameroon) Serge Kaole			(Spain) Joaco Cañas
Mendiola 1991	(Ghana) Daniel Ashley	(Ivory Coast) Hosni Dosso	(Iran) Hamed Hajimehdi	(South Korea) Kim Minsu		(Ivory Coast) Dini Ouattara (Ghana) Stephen Appiah
Stallion Laguna	(South Korea) Kim Sungmin	(United States) Abraham Placito	(Brazil) Gabriel Silva	(Senegal) Abou Sy	(Mexico) Juan Trujillo	(Senegal) Ibrahima Ndour (Argentina) Ricardo Sendra
United City	(United States) Jonny Campbell	(New Zealand) Jai Ingham	(South Korea) Jung Da-hwon	(Spain) Bienvenido Marañón^{1}		(Japan) Takashi Odawara (Senegal) Robert Lopez Mendy

Notes

1. Now a naturalized citizen of the Philippines. Sporting nationality change was subject to be confirmed by FIFA.

Foreign players by confederation
AFC	South Korea (3), Japan (3), Iran (1)
CAF	Ghana (2), Cameroon (2), Senegal (1), Ivory Coast (1), Democratic Republic of the Congo (1)
CONCACAF	Mexico (1), Trinidad and Tobago (1), United States (2)
CONMEBOL	Brazil (1), Argentina (1)
OFC	New Zealand (1)
UEFA	Spain (2)
