= Abraham Placito =

American soccer player (born 1994)

Personal information
- Full name: Abraham Placito
- Date of birth: February 9, 1994 (age 32)
- Place of birth: Perris, California, United States
- Height: 6 ft 2 in (1.88 m)
- Position: Center-back

Team information
- Current team: Stallion Laguna
- Number: 34

Youth career
- –2014: Chivas USA

College career
Years	Team	Apps	(Gls)
2012–2014	Mt. SAC Mounties		
2014–2016	Northwest Nazarene Nighthawks	16	(4)
2016–2017	California Baptist Lancers		

Senior career*
Years	Team	Apps	(Gls)
2017–2019	Golden State Force	7	(0)
2019–2020	Los Angeles Force	1	(0)
2021	Golden State Force	2	(0)
2021	Stallion Laguna	0	(0)
2023–	Stallion Laguna	32	(9)
- * Club domestic league appearances and goals as of June 7, 2025

Abraham Placito (born February 9, 1994) is an American professional soccer player who currently plays as a center-back for Philippines Football League club Stallion Laguna.

== Personal life ==
Placito was born in Perris, California. While playing college soccer, he also played with the academy of now-defunct Major League Soccer side Chivas USA.

== Career ==
=== College career ===
==== Mt. San Antonio College ====
While playing for Chivas USA's reserves, he played soccer for Mt. San Antonio College for two years. In 2014, his last year with the team, he was named defensive player of the year in the South Coast Conference and was named in the All-American squad.

==== Northwest Nazarene University ====
Placito transferred to Northwest Nazarene University in 2014, playing for their soccer team for three years. In 2015, he was named to the West Region Team of the NSCAA.

==== California Baptist University ====
In 2016, his last year in college, he transferred again to California Baptist University, and was included in the second team for the All-America team in the 2017 NCAA Division II as a senior.

=== Professional career ===
==== Golden State Force ====
In 2017, Placito signed his first professional contract with Golden State Force of the USL League Two, playing for two years.

==== Los Angeles Force ====
In 2019, he signed with the Los Angeles Force of the National Independent Soccer Association.

==== Stallion Laguna ====
In late 2021, he left Golden State Force to sign with Stallion Laguna of the Philippines Football League. The club was supposed to compete in the 2021 season of the Philippines Football League, but the season was canceled due to the COVID-19 pandemic. Placito instead made his debut for the team in the 2021 Copa Paulino Alcantara. He scored in the semifinals against the Azkals Development Team to put Stallion 1–0 up, before the team conceded two and finished third. After leaving Stallion for a short while, he returned in 2023 to help the club reach the AFC Cup for the very first time. He renewed his contract with the club that same year.
