= Louie Casas =

Filipino association football player

Personal information
- Full name: Louie Michael Roble Casas
- Date of birth: 12 March 1986 (age 40)
- Place of birth: Danao, Cebu, Philippines
- Height: 1.71 m (5 ft 7 in)
- Position: Goalkeeper

Team information
- Current team: Kaya–Iloilo
- Number: 25

Youth career
- 2004–2008: San Beda FC
- 2008–2013: USLS F.C.

Senior career*
Years	Team	Apps	(Gls)
2013–2018	Ceres–Negros		
2018	Global Cebu		
2019–2022	Kaya–Iloilo		

International career^{‡}
2004–2018	Philippines	14	(0)
- * Club domestic league appearances and goals as of 1 March 2019 ‡ National team caps and goals as of 3 March 2016

Louie Michael Roble Casas (born 12 March 1986) is a Filipino former footballer who last played as a goalkeeper for Kaya–Iloilo in the Philippines Football League. He previously played in the now defunct UFL Division 1 for Ceres. Casas was a member of the Philippines national football team being part of the squad in the 2004 AFF Championship.

== Career ==
=== Ceres-Negros ===
In 2013, after graduating in University of St. La Salle he joined UFL Division 2 club Ceres. On 23 February 2016, he made his AFC Cup debut with Ceres F.C. in a 2–2 draw against Selangor FA.

=== Global Cebu ===
On 2018, after his five-year stint with Ceres, he joined fellow Philippines Football League club Global Cebu on a free transfer.

=== Kaya F.C.–Iloilo ===
Casas was signed by Kaya F.C.–Iloilo in January 2019. He led the team to win the 2021 Copa Paulino Alcantara. He retired from competitive football in January 2022.

== International career ==
Casas made his debut for the Philippines in the 2004 AFF Championship.

After 14 years, in September 2018, he was again called up in the Philippines squad for a national team training camp, and a friendly game against Bahrain.
