= Marco Casambre =

Filipino footballer (born 1998)

Personal information
- Full name: Marco Alessandro Punzal Casambre
- Date of birth: December 18, 1998 (age 27)
- Place of birth: Quezon City, Philippines
- Height: 1.80 m (5 ft 11 in)
- Position: Center-back

Team information
- Current team: Kaya–Iloilo
- Number: 15

Youth career
- Kaya Elite

College career
Years	Team	Apps	(Gls)
- University of the Philippines

Senior career*
Years	Team	Apps	(Gls)
2015–2017	Global Cebu	15	(0)
2018	Davao Aguilas	8	(0)
2019–2020	Chainat Hornbill	9	(0)
2020–	Kaya–Iloilo	23	(1)
2022	→ Sukhothai (loan)	3	(0)

International career^{‡}
2011	Philippines U13		
2012	Philippines U14		
2014–2015	Philippines U19		
2019–2021	Philippines U23	0	(0)
2016–2019	Philippines	2	(0)
- * Club domestic league appearances and goals as of 27 May 2023 ‡ National team caps and goals as of 13:52 7 June 2019 (UTC)

Marco Alessandro Punzal Casambre (born December 18, 1998) is a Filipino professional footballer who plays as a center-back for Philippines Football League club Kaya–Iloilo.

== Education ==
Casambre studied at Claret School of Quezon City where he graduated with first honorable mention. He entered the University of the Philippines to take up a course on Sports Science.

== Collegiate career ==
Casambre played for the UP Fighting Maroons collegiate football team. He was part of the squad that won the 2016 University Games in Dumaguete before playing in UAAP Season 79 for the said University team.

== Club career ==
=== Youth ===
He once played for the Kaya Elite youth team.

=== Ceres ===
Casambre previously played for Ceres F.C. of the then-existing United Football League before moving to Global F.C.

=== Global Cebu ===
He made his starting player debut in an international club competition with Global at the 2016 Singapore Cup in a match against Cambodian club Nagaworld FC on May 28, 2016. He played for Global, which renamed itself as Global Cebu when it joined the Philippines Football League (PFL).

=== Davao Aguilas ===
In July 2018, he moved to Davao Aguilas. His club would later decide to dissolve its first team in December 2018, leaving him without a club.

=== Chainat Hornbill ===
In January 2019, Casambre signed with the Chainat Hornbill of the Thai League 1.

=== Kaya–Iloilo ===
In 2020, Casambre returned to the Philippines and joined Kaya–Iloilo.

==== Loan to Sukhothai ====
In January 2022, Casambre was sent out on loan to Thai League 2 club Sukhothai until June 2022.

== International career ==
=== Philippines youth ===
In 2011, Casambre was part of the Philippine national under-13 team that participated in the AFC U13 Festival of Football in Malaysia. In 2012, Casambre played for the Philippine national under-14 team which participated at the six-nation Japan-East Asean Football Exchange Programme U-14 Youth Football Festival hosted in Osaka. The youth team finished third in said tournament.

=== Philippines U19 ===
He later became part of the under-19 team and was part of the squad that participated at the 2015 AFF U-19 Youth Championship. He made his debut for Philippines U19 in a 1−2 win against Brunei U19.

=== Philippines U22 ===
Casambre was part of the Philippines U22 squad that competed in the 2019 Southeast Asian Games held in the Philippines.

=== Philippines ===
In March 2016, he was among the 35 players called up by the Philippine Football Federation to participate in a training camp with the senior national team, which was preparing for two then upcoming 2018 FIFA World Cup qualification matches.

Casambre impressed Philippine head coach Thomas Dooley during training. Dooley described the footballer as "awake" and "there", complimented his play using his left foot, noted his minimal mistakes when passing out of the back, and remarked that he was "good in the air". This led to the Philippine mentor to select him as one of the starting players in the Philippines match against Thailand on November 25, 2016, the team's final group stage match at the 2016 AFF Championship. He was later subbed out in his international debut match for Kevin Ingreso in the 79th minute.

== Honors ==
Kaya–Iloilo

- Philippines Football League: 2022–23
