= Moro Lorenzo =

Filipino basketball player and corporate executive

- Occupations: Businessman; Basketball executive
- Known for: Former chairman and president of Pepsi-Cola Products Philippines, Inc.
- Basketball career

Career information
- College: Ateneo

Career history
- Philippine Airlines
Medals
Men's basketball
Representing Philippines
Asian Games
Gold medal – first place	1951 New Delhi	Team

Luis Francisco "Chitong" Lorenzo (died April 12, 1997), better known as Moro Lorenzo and also as Luis F. Lorenzo Sr., was a Filipino basketball player and corporate executive.

Lorenzo played college basketball for the Ateneo de Manila. The fabled Blue Eagle was the original one-hand set-shooter of Philippine basketball. The dusky cager from Zamboanga was the scoring ace of the Eagles who thrilled the NCAA crowd in the years 1947 to 1951. He moved on to play for Philippine Airlines in the Manila Industrial and Commercial Athletic Association.

After his playing years, Lorenzo became manager of Del Monte Packing Corporation plantation in Bukidnon from 1964 to 1970. He was elected to the Constitutional Convention and by the 1970s, he was vice president of his company with offices at Makati, Rizal.

Later on, he was also part of the Philippine national basketball team that won the gold medal at the 1951 Asian Games. He was also the owner of the Pepsi Bottlers basketball team in the Philippine Basketball Association, and the chairman and president of Pepsi-Cola Products Philippines, Inc. The Moro Lorenzo Sports Center inside the Ateneo de Manila University is named after him.

Lorenzo married Dr. Alicia "Alice" Paez. His son, Luis P. Lorenzo Jr., is an influential Filipino businessman and politician, having served as Secretary of Agriculture and a presidential advisor.
