= Eric Esso =

Ghanaian footballer (born 1994)

Personal information
- Full name: Eric Esso
- Date of birth: 21 June 1994 (age 32)
- Place of birth: Ghana
- Height: 1.76 m (5 ft 9 in)
- Position: Midfielder

Team information
- Current team: Kaya–Iloilo
- Number: 25

Senior career*
Years	Team	Apps	(Gls)
2019–2022	Ashanti Gold	66	(4)
2022–2024	Hearts of Oak	38	(0)
2024–	Kaya–Iloilo	38	(4)
- * Club domestic league appearances and goals as of 21 February 2026

Eric Esso (born 21 June 1994) is a Ghanaian professional footballer who plays as midfielder for Philippines Football League club Kaya–Iloilo. He is the brother of Joseph Esso.

== Club career ==
Esso was signed by Ashanti Gold in December 2019. Prior to that he had featured for Heart of Lions. He featured for Ashanti Gold during the 2020–21 CAF Confederation Cup.

== Personal life ==
Esso is the older brother of fellow professional footballer Joseph Esso who is currently player with Malaysia Super League club Negeri Sembilan as of 2025.
