= Jarvey Gayoso =

Filipino footballer (born 1997)

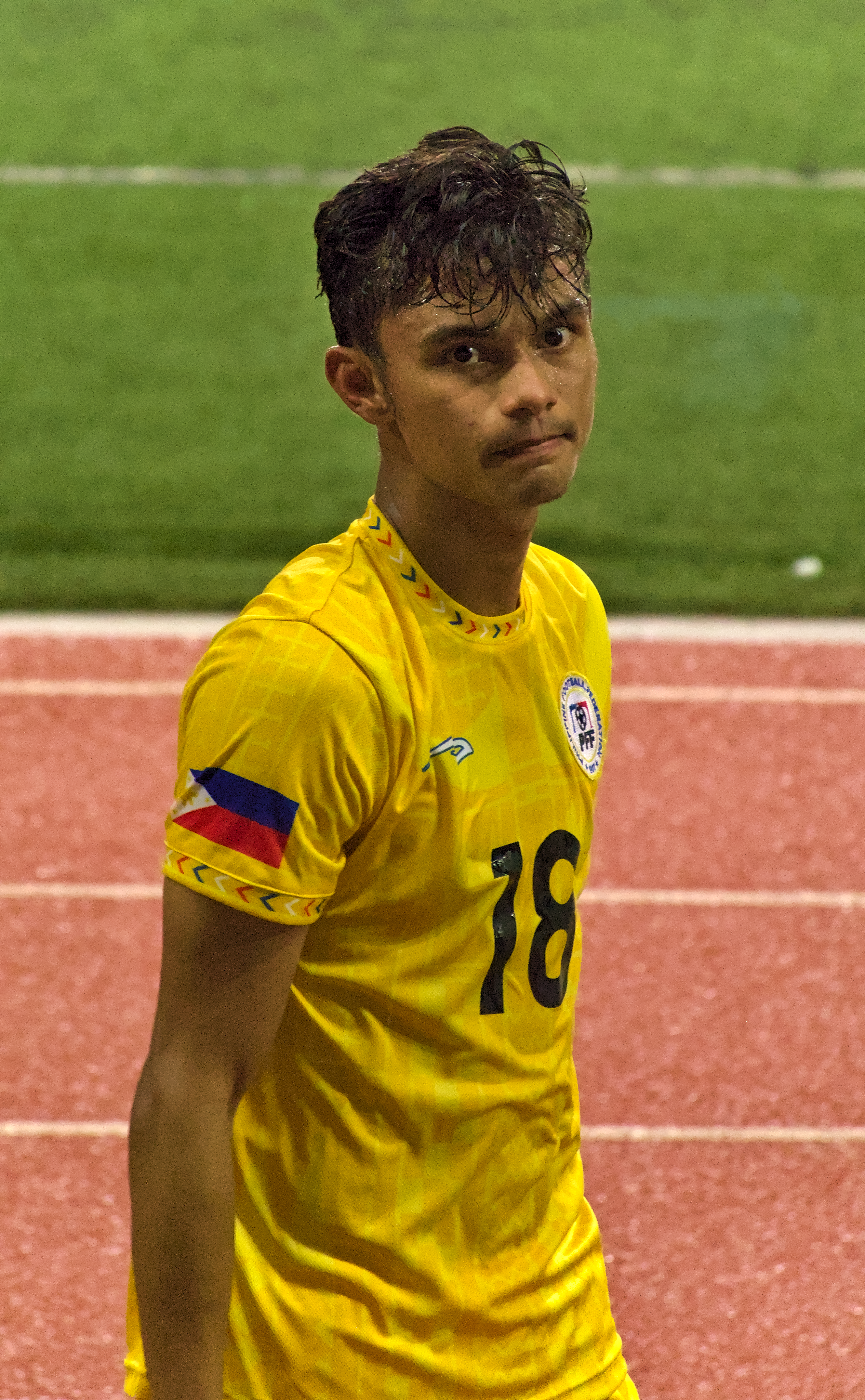
- Gayoso after a match against Afghanistan in 2023

Personal information
- Full name: Javier Agustine Ocampo Gayoso
- Date of birth: February 11, 1997 (age 29)
- Place of birth: Las Piñas, Philippines
- Height: 1.85 m (6 ft 1 in)
- Position: Forward

Team information
- Current team: Penang

Youth career
- 2013–2015: Ateneo de Manila High School

College career
Years	Team	Apps	(Gls)
2015–2019	Ateneo de Manila University	63	(50)

Senior career*
Years	Team	Apps	(Gls)
2016	Agila MSA	3	(2)
2020–2022	Azkals Development Team	5	(4)
2021	→ Kaya–Iloilo (loan)	0	(0)
2022–2024	Kaya–Iloilo	31	(35)
2024–2025	Phnom Penh Crown	24	(14)
2025–2026	Bangkok	21	(2)
2026–	Penang	0	(0)

International career^{‡}
2015	Philippines U19	3	(1)
2017–2019	Philippines U23	10	(2)
2017–	Philippines	41	(7)
- * Club domestic league appearances and goals as of August 14, 2026 ‡ National team caps and goals as of October 5, 2026

Javier Augustine "Jarvey" Ocampo Gayoso (Tagalog pronunciation: [hɐvˈjeɾ haɾvi ɡɐˈjoso]; born February 11, 1997) is a Filipino professional footballer who plays as a forward for Penang and the Philippines national team.

== Early life and education ==
Javier Gayoso, who is the son of professional basketball player Jayvee Gayoso, played basketball in his youth but eventually decided to focus on football, which he started playing at age 4. His mother introduced him to football in kindergarten and allowed him to participate in a football camp.

His maternal grandfather, Ed Ocampo, and maternal uncle, Alvin Ocampo, were both footballers.

Gayoso attended the Ateneo de Manila High School and is currently pursuing collegiate studies at the Ateneo de Manila University. Despite his decision to end his collegiate football stint in February 2020, he expressed intent to finish his studies. He planned to finish the first semester of that school year and take a leave of absence from the Ateneo to concentrate on football.

== High school and college career ==
=== High school ===
Gayoso played for the football and track and field teams of Ateneo de Manila High School where he achieved gold medals for the 200 meter dash, 400 meter dash, high jump, and long jump, and was named MVP of UAAP Season 77 for Athletics.

=== Ateneo de Manila University ===
In the University Athletic Association of the Philippines (UAAP), Gayoso played for the senior football team of the Ateneo de Manila University, debuting in Season 78. Ateneo finished third in the elimination round and later lost to the University of the Philippines in the final. Gayoso was recognized as the top scorer of the season with 11 goals along with Paolo Salenga of the National University.

In Season 79, Gayoso helped Ateneo secure the UAAP football title by scoring the lone goal of the match. He was eventually named Best Striker and MVP of Season 79. In Season 80 in 2018, he was again awarded best striker of the UAAP. In Season 81 he scored a goal that led to extra time in the 90th minute. He also received his fourth best striker award with 12 goals scored and was named MVP of Season 81.

In February 2020, Gayoso announced that he would not play for Ateneo in Season 82, despite still having one year eligibility, deciding to pursue a professional career after his stint with the Philippine youth national team at the 2019 Southeast Asian Games.

== Club career ==
=== Azkals Development Team ===
==== 2020 PFL season ====
As part of Gayoso's announcement to prematurely end his collegiate career, he cited an opportunity to play football outside the Philippines as one of his reasons. He also disclosed as part of his preparations to play overseas that he would be playing for a local club.

Gayoso joined the Azkals Development Team (ADT) of the Philippines Football League (PFL) for the 2020 season. Despite previously playing as a striker in college and youth-level competitions, he was listed as a defender for ADT, which is mentored by Philippines national team coach Scott Cooper. Previously, Gayoso had also played as a defender for the Philippines at the 2019 Southeast Asian Games. He made his PFL debut in the league's first match of the season on October 28, a 1–0 loss to United City. He was named man of the match after scoring ADT's first-ever PFL goal on November 3, in a 2–0 win over Mendiola. He was man of the match again in their 5–0 win over Maharlika Manila on November 6, when he scored a brace and assisted Chima Uzoka twice. In their final match of the season, Gayoso's penalty kick sealed their 2–0 win over Stallion Laguna.

In December 2020, Gayoso and Cooper went to Thailand to complete a transfer deal with Muangthong United of Thai League 1. However, as of June 2021, the move apparently fell through.

==== 2021 loan to Kaya–Iloilo ====
On June 13, 2021, PFL club Kaya–Iloilo announced their signing of Gayoso. He made his debut on June 26, coming on as a second-half substitute in the club's first ever AFC Champions League group stage match, a 4–1 loss to BG Pathum United.

==== 2021 Copa Paulino Alcantara ====
On August 6, 2021, Kaya announced that Gayoso would return to ADT. In the 2021 Copa Paulino Alcantara group stage, he scored five goals in their 9–0 thrashing of Mendiola, setting the competition's record for most goals by a player in a single match. He also scored in the semi-final against Stallion Laguna, but suffered a hamstring injury late in the match. This made him miss the final, which ADT lost to Kaya. Nonetheless, his total of six goals won him the Golden Boot award.

=== Kaya–Iloilo ===
On February 8, 2022, Kaya–Iloilo announced the signing of Gayoso. With the club, he won two PFL titles (2023-24, and 2024) and a Copa Paulino Alcantara title in 2023.

=== Phnom Penh Crown ===
Cambodian Premier League club Phnom Penh Crown announced on July 11, 2024, that they have signed in Gayoso.

== International career ==
=== Youth ===
For most of his youth career, Gayoso played as a forward. Gayoso was part of the Philippine national under-19 team that took part in the 2016 AFC U-19 Championship qualifiers in 2015. He scored the national team's solitary goal in the campaign during the 2–1 loss to Laos.

He was a member of the Philippine under-22 team that participated in the 2017 Southeast Asian Games. In that stint, he scored a brace against East Timor. The Philippines finished fourth out of six in their group and were unable to advance to the knockout rounds.

In March 2019, Gayoso played for the Philippines in the qualifiers for the 2020 AFC U-23 Championship. He scored a brace in the first half of the match against Laos; however, the Laotians managed to come back and win 3–2. Gayoso's goals were the only ones scored by the Philippines in the qualifiers as they crashed out without a single win.

Gayoso took part in the Southeast Asian Games again in the 2019 edition which was hosted at home. He almost did not make the final squad but his college coach Jaypee Merida helped him work on his weaknesses. For this edition of the regional games, he played out-of-position as a right-back. National team coach Scott Cooper, is a proponent of Gayoso's shift from playing as a striker to a defender.

=== Senior ===
In November 2017, Gayoso received his first call-up to play for the senior national team which played at the 2017 CTFA International Tournament, a friendly tournament in Taiwan. The squad was led by Marlon Maro in lieu of head coach Thomas Dooley. He earned his first senior cap on December 1, 2017, appearing as a starter in the 3–1 win against Laos.

Gayoso scored his first international goal on October 3, 2018, against Laos during the 2018 Bangabandhu Cup at the Sylhet District Stadium.

== Career statistics ==
=== Club ===
As of April 27, 2024

Club	Season	League			Cup		Continental		Total	
Club	Season	Division	Apps	Goals	Apps	Goals	Apps	Goals	Apps	Goals
ADT	2020	PFL	5	4	–		–		5	4
ADT	2021	PFL	–		3	6	–		3	6
Kaya–Iloilo	2021	PFL	–		–		5	0	5	0
Kaya–Iloilo	2022–23	PFL	18	12	4	0	3	1	25	13
Kaya–Iloilo	2023–24	PFL	12	23	6	5	5	2	23	30
Phnom Penh Crown	2024–25	CPL	1	1	1	0	–	–	2	1
Career total			36	40	14	11	13	3	63	54

=== International ===
As of match played 2 October 2026

Appearances and goals by year
National team	Year	Apps	Goals
Philippines	2017	1	0
Philippines	2018	2	1
Philippines	2019	0	0
Philippines	2020	0	0
Philippines	2021	3	0
Philippines	2022	3	0
Philippines	2023	4	1
Philippines	2024	13	1
Philippines	2025	6	1
Philippines	2026	9	3
Total		41	7

Scores and results list the Philippines' goal tally first.

#	Date	Venue	Opponent	Score	Result	Competition
1.	October 3, 2018	Sylhet District Stadium, Sylhet, Bangladesh	Laos	2–0	3–1	2018 Bangabandhu Cup
2.	June 16, 2023	Rizal Memorial Stadium, Manila, Philippines	Nepal	1–0	1–0	Friendly
3.	December 18, 2024	Rizal Memorial Stadium, Manila, Philippines	Vietnam	1–0	1–1	2024 ASEAN Championship
4.	October 14, 2025	New Clark City Athletics Stadium, Capas, Philippines	Timor-Leste	3–1	3–1	2027 AFC Asian Cup qualification
5.	June 3, 2026	Rizal Memorial Stadium, Manila, Philippines	Guam	2–0	5–1	Friendly
6.	July 28, 2026	New Clark City Athletics Stadium, Capas, Philippines	Myanmar	1–2	1–4	2026 ASEAN Championship
7.	August 1, 2026	New Laos National Stadium, Vientiane, Laos	Laos	3–1	4–1	2026 ASEAN Championship

== Personal life ==
Gayoso married his long-time girlfriend, Danica Gutierrez, in December 2024. They have a daughter, born in 2025.

== Honors ==
Azkals Development Team

- Copa Paulino Alcantara runner-up: 2021

Kaya–Iloilo

- Philippines Football League: 2022–23, 2024
- Copa Paulino Alcantara: 2023

Individual

- Copa Paulino Alcantara Golden Boot: 2021
- Philippines Football League Golden Boot: 2023–24
