= Mar Diano =

Filipino footballer (born 1997)

Personal information
- Full name: Mar Vincent Azuero Diano
- Date of birth: July 24, 1997 (age 29)
- Place of birth: Masbate City, Philippines
- Height: 1.74 m (5 ft 9 in)
- Position: Centre back

Team information
- Current team: Kaya–Iloilo
- Number: 12

College career
Years	Team	Apps	(Gls)
–	University of the East		

Senior career*
Years	Team	Apps	(Gls)
2019	Mendiola	21	(1)
2020–2022	Azkals Development Team	5	(0)
2022–	Kaya–Iloilo	23	(0)

International career^{‡}
2015–2016	Philippines U19	7	(0)
2019	Philippines U23	4	(1)
2021–	Philippines	2	(0)
- * Club domestic league appearances and goals as of 25 May 2023 ‡ National team caps and goals as of September 10, 2022

Mar Vincent Azuero Diano (born 24 July 1997) is a Filipino professional footballer who plays as a centre back for Philippines Football League club Kaya–Iloilo and the Philippines national team.

== College career ==
Diano attended the University of the East, playing for the UE Red Warriors football team in the University Athletic Association of the Philippines (UAAP). He played as a striker with the Red Warriors.

== Club career ==
=== Mendiola 1991 ===
Diano has played in the Philippines Football League. In 2019, he was part of Mendiola F.C. 1991.

=== Azkals Development Team ===
In 2020, he joined Azkals Development Team (ADT), a club whose roster is meant to comprise prospects for the Philippine national team.

In late 2020, Thai club Muangthong United reportedly wanted to sign in Diano after his 2020 season run with ADT. However the transfer has not materialized and Diano remained with ADT. Diano would help ADT finish as runners-up at the 2021 Copa Paulino Alcantara.

=== Kaya-Iloilo ===
In January 2022, Diano signed for Kaya-Iloilo.

== International career ==
=== Philippines U19 ===
Diano represented his country at the 2015 AFF U-19 Youth Championship

=== Philippines U22 ===
He was also part of the U22 squad at the 2019 Southeast Asian Games, where he scored a goal against Timor-Leste.

=== Philippines ===
Diano had his first international cap for the Philippines national team during the 2022 FIFA World Cup qualifiers match against Maldives 15 June 2021. He came in as a substitute for Justin Baas in the match which ended in a 1–1 draw.

== Career statistics ==
=== Club ===
As of 25 May 2023.

Club	Season	League			Cup		Continental		Total	
Club	Season	Division	Apps	Goals	Apps	Goals	Apps	Goals	Apps	Goals
Mendiola 1991	2019	PFL	21	1	3	0	–		24	1
Azkals Development Team	2020	PFL	5	0	–		–		5	0
Azkals Development Team	2021	PFL	–		3	1	–		3	1
Kaya–Iloilo	2022–23	PFL	23	0	7	0	3	0	33	0
Career total			49	1	13	1	3	0	65	2

== Honors ==
Azkals Development Team

- Copa Paulino Alcantara runner-up: 2021

Kaya–Iloilo

- Philippines Football League: 2022–23
- Copa Paulino Alcantara runner-up: 2022
