= Yrick Gallantes =

Filipino footballer

Personal information
- Full name: Yrick Rapisura Gallantes
- Date of birth: 14 January 2001 (age 25)
- Place of birth: Manila, Philippines
- Position: Left back

Team information
- Current team: Preston Athletic

Youth career
- Hibernian

Senior career*
Years	Team	Apps	(Gls)
2019–2021	Hibernian	0	(0)
2019–2020	→ Gala Fairydean Rovers (loan)		
2020	→ Azkals Development Team (loan)	5	(1)
2021–2023	Azkals Development Team	12	(0)
2023–2024	Preston Athletic		
2024–2025	One Taguig	24	(1)
2025–	Preston Athletic	0	(0)

International career
2019–2023	Philippines U23	16	(0)
2019–	Philippines	7	(0)
- * Club domestic league appearances and goals

Yrick Rapisura Gallantes (born 14 January 2001) is a Filipino professional footballer who plays as a left back for Preston Athletic and the Philippines national team.

== Club career ==
=== Hibernian ===
Gallantes was born in the Philippines, but was raised in Scotland after his family emigrated there. He started his football career in the Hibernian academy. He first played for the club's development squad in October 2016, aged 15.

==== Loan to Gala Fairydean Rovers ====
In July 2019, Galantes was sent out on loan to Lowland Football League club Gala Fairydean Rovers. On 21 September, he scored in the first round of the Scottish Cup as Gala won 3–1 away over Dalbeattie Star.

=== Azkals Development Team ===
In October 2020, Gallantes was loaned to the Azkals Development Team (ADT) of the Philippines Football League (PFL). He started in ADT's first PFL match of the season on 28 October, a 1–0 loss to United City. He scored his first PFL goal on 6 November, in a 5–0 victory over Maharlika Manila.

In September 2021, Gallantes returned to ADT on a permanent deal.

=== Preston Athletic ===
In July 2025, Gallantes returned to East of Scotland League First Division club Preston Athletic.

== International career ==
He is currently available to represent both the Philippines and Scotland.

=== Philippines U-23 ===
Gallantes was part of the Philippines U-23 squad that competed in the 2019 Southeast Asian Games held in Philippines.

Gallantes was included in the 20-man squad for 31st Southeast Asian Games, which was held in Vietnam.

=== Philippines ===
In March 2019, Gallantes received an invitation to train with the Philippines national team. He was called up for the Philippines squad in August 2019, ahead of the 2022 FIFA World Cup qualifiers against Syria and Guam. He made his debut for the Philippines in a 4–1 win against Guam on 10 September. He was part of the starting eleven of that match but was substituted out on the 36th minute for Javier Patiño.

== Other ventures ==
=== Costa Coffee ===
In October 2025, Gallantes accepted a job offer at Costa Coffee and is still currently under employment.
