= Joaco Cañas =

Spanish footballer (born 1987)

Personal information
- Full name: Joaquín Carlos Cañas García
- Date of birth: 30 August 1987 (age 39)
- Place of birth: Madrid, Spain
- Height: 1.85 m (6 ft 1 in)
- Position: Centre back

Team information
- Current team: Cebu
- Number: 4

Senior career*
| Years | Team | Apps | (Gls) |
| 2006–2009 | Puerta Bonita | | |
| 2009–2010 | Colmenar Viejo | | |
| 2010–2012 | Internacional Madrid | | |
| 2012–2013 | Stallion | | |
| 2013–2017 | Meralco | | |
| 2018 | Victory | | |
| 2020–2021 | Maharlika Manila | | |
| 2021– | Cebu | 3 | (0) |
- * Club domestic league appearances and goals as of 2 November 2021

Joaquín Carlos "Joaco" Cañas García (Spanish pronunciation: [ˈkaɲas]; born 30 August 1987) is a Spanish footballer who plays as a defender for Philippines Football League (PFL) club Cebu.

== Career ==
In 2006, Joaco Cañas began his professional football career playing for CD Puerta Bonita at the age of 17. He played for AD Colmenar Viejo and Internacional de Madrid before moving to the Philippines in 2012. From 2012 to 2017, Joaco Cañas played in the United Football League (UFL) with Stallion F.C. (2012/2013) and with Loyola (2013/2017). He moved to the Maldives in 2018 to play for Victory Sports Club. He then went back to the Philippines in 2019 and in 2020 he played for Maharlika Manila F.C.

Cañas joined Cebu F.C. in 2021.
