= Daizo Horikoshi =

Japanese footballer

Personal information
- Date of birth: 14 September 1996 (age 30)
- Place of birth: Kanagawa, Japan
- Height: 1.71 m (5 ft 7 1/2 in)
- Positions: Forward; winger

Team information
- Current team: ISI Dangkor Senchey
- Number: 20

Youth career
- 2012–2014: Tama University Meguro High School

College career
Years	Team	Apps	(Gls)
2015–2018	Tokai University		

Senior career*
Years	Team	Apps	(Gls)
2019–2020	Albirex Niigata (S)	19	(6)
2020–2023	Kaya–Iloilo	27	(15)
2024	Trat	14	(2)
2024	Kaya–Iloilo	6	(2)
2025–2026	FC Osaka	9	(2)
2026	NWS Spirit	4	(0)
2026–	ISI Dangkor Senchey	6	(1)
- * Club domestic league appearances and goals as of 10 November 2026

Daizo Horikoshi (堀越 大蔵, Horikoshi Daizo; born 14 September 1996) is a Japanese professional footballer who plays as a winger for Australian NPL NSW club NWS Spirit.

== Club career ==
=== Albirex Niigata (S) ===
After graduating from Tokai University, Horikoshi signed for Albirex Niigata (S) of the Singapore Premier League (SPL) for their 2019 season. He started in the 2019 Singapore Community Shield, where they lost to Home United, 5–4 on penalties. He scored the opening goal on their 2–1 away league win over Warriors FC on 13 April.

=== Kaya–Iloilo ===
In February 2020, it was announced that Horikoshi had signed for Kaya–Iloilo of the Philippines Football League (PFL). He make his debut for the club on 12 February during the 2020 AFC Cup group stage match against Myanmar club Shan United in a 2–0 win.

On 26 June 2021, Horikoshi make his AFC Champions League debut in a 4–1 lost against Thailand club BG Pathum United.He scored his first goal for the club on 7 November 2021 in their Copa Paulino Alcantara opening match, a 2–0 win over the Azkals Development Team. He was named the man of the match that night. Kaya went on to win the 2021 Copa Paulino Alcantara.

Horikoshi was the top goalscorer in the 2022 Copa Paulino Alcantara with six goals in the tournament, earning him the Golden Boot award. Kaya finished as the competition's runners-up.

In the 2022–23 PFL season, he won the league's Golden Ball (best player of the season) and Golden Boot awards, scoring 15 goals and providing 19 assists as Kaya won the league title for the first time. Kaya went on to complete a domestic double by winning the 2023 Copa Paulino Alcantara. Horikoshi registered the most assists in the Copa, with 15, and was awarded the Golden Ball.

In the 2023–24 AFC Champions League group stage, he scored an equalizer against J1 League champions Yokohama F. Marinos. However, the match ended as a 2–1 home lost. Horikoshi departed Kaya in January 2024.

=== Trat ===
On 18 January 2024, Horikoshi joined Thai League 1 club Trat for the second half of the 2023–24 season. He make his debut for the club on 11 February in a 1–1 draw against Sukhothai. Horikoshi then scored his first goal for the club on 4 March in a 2–2 draw against Ratchaburi. On 28 April, Horikoshi assisted twice where he was instrumental in the match helping his team to defeat Police Tero in a 4–2 league win.

=== Return to Kaya–Iloilo ===
On 5 September 2024, Kaya–Iloilo announced the return of Horikoshi to the club. On 3 October, he scored the opening goal during the 2024–25 AFC Champions League Two group stage match against Australian club Sydney FC, however, the club lost to the visitors 4–1.

== Personal life ==
Horikoshi's younger brother, Tamon, is also a footballer. He also attended Tokai University and had been Daizo's teammate at Kaya in 2023.

== Career statistics ==
=== Club ===
As of match played 6 May 2025

Club	Season	League			Cup (Note: Includes the Singapore Cup in Singapore, and the Copa Paulino Alcantara in the Philippines.)		League Cup		Asia		Other		Total	
Club	Season	League	Apps	Goals	Apps	Goals	Apps	Goals	Apps	Goals	Apps	Goals	Apps	Goals
Albirex Niigata (S)	2019	Singapore Premier League	19	6	3	2	0	0	0	0	1 (Note: Appearance in Singapore Community Shield)	0	23	8
Albirex Niigata (S)	Total		19	6	3	2	0	0	0	0	1	0	23	8
Kaya–Iloilo	2020	Philippines Football League	5	0	~~0~~	~~0~~	~~0~~	~~0~~	3 (Note: Appearances in AFC Cup)	0	0	0	8	0
Kaya–Iloilo	2021	Philippines Football League	~~0~~	~~0~~	4	2	~~0~~	~~0~~	7 (Note: Appearances in AFC Champions League)	0	0	0	11	2
Kaya–Iloilo	2022–23	Philippines Football League	22	15	17 (Note: 8 appearances in 2022 and 9 appearances in 2023.)	12 (Note: 6 goals in 2022 and 6 goals in 2023.)	~~0~~	~~0~~	6	1	0	0	45	28
Kaya–Iloilo	Total		27	15	21	14	~~0~~	~~0~~	16	1	0	0	64	30
Trat	2023–24	Thai League 1	14	2	0	0	1	0	0	0	0	0	15	2
Kaya–Iloilo	2024	Philippines Football League	6	2	0	0	0	0	6	2	0	0	12	4
FC Osaka	2025	J3 League	6	1	0	0	1	0	0	0	0	0	7	1
Career total			72	26	24	16	2	0	22	3	1	0	121	45

== Honours ==
Kaya–Iloilo

- Philippines Football League: 2022–23
- Copa Paulino Alcantara: 2021, 2023; runner-up: 2022

Individual

- Philippines Football League Golden Ball: 2022–23
- Philippines Football League Golden Boot: 2022–23
- Copa Paulino Alcantara Golden Ball: 2023
- Copa Paulino Alcantara Golden Boot: 2022
