= Simone Rota =

Filipino footballer (born 1984)

Personal information
- Full name: Simone Mondiali Rota
- Date of birth: November 6, 1984 (age 42) (Note: As per records; Rota is reportedly at least a two month old baby when he was taken in by orphanage in Parañaque in November 1984.)
- Place of birth: Parañaque, Philippines
- Height: 1.78 m (5 ft 10 in)
- Position: Right-back

Senior career*
Years	Team	Apps	(Gls)
2001–2010	Pro Sesto	127	(5)
2006	→ Manfredonia (loan)	7	(0)
2008–2009	→ Lugano (loan)	17	(6)
2010–2012	Borgomanero	54	(3)
2012–2014	Asti	15	(3)
2014–2016	Stallion	43	(7)
2017	Ceres-Negros	1	(0)
2017–2019	Davao Aguilas	28	(1)
2019–2025	Kaya–Iloilo	55	(5)
Total		347	(30)

International career
2004–2005	Italy U20 Lega Pro		
2014–2022	Philippines	27	(2)
Medal record
Men's football
Representing Philippines
AFC Challenge Cup
Silver medal – second place	2014 Maldives
- * Club domestic league appearances and goals as of August 7, 2018

Simone Mondiali Rota (born November 6, 1984) is a Filipino former professional footballer who played as a right-back.

== Early life ==
Simone Rota is reportedly a product of teenage pregnancy and was abandoned. He was taken in by Buklod Kalinga, an orphanage in Parañaque run by Franciscan sisters when he was a baby. He was raised by Sister May Memorial, whom he considers a second mother. A woman named Sonia Tuley reportedly left Rota at the convent when he was about two months old in November 1984. As per records however, Rota's birthday is on November 6, 1984, with Parañaque as his birthplace.

Rota was later adopted by Maurizio Rota and Marilena Mondiali, an Italian couple who worked as taxi drivers. He has a sister, Valentina, who was also born on November 6 and adopted from the Philippines.

Mother Flora Zippo, an Italian missionary, helped find families to adopt Rota.

== Club career ==
=== Italy ===
Rota entered the first team of Pro Sesto in the 2001–02 Serie C2 season, becoming a regular the following year. In 2005, the team was promoted to Serie C1 as the Group A winner of the 2004–05 Serie C2 season. Subsequently, Rota was also selected for the Mirop Cup as a member of Italy U-20 Lega Pro. Their team went up against the youth national teams of Styria, Croatia, Hungary, and Slovenia, and eventually Italy's U-20 Lega Pro team was named the champion of that tournament.

Rota also capped for the Italy U-20 Lega Pro team in the 2005 Trofeo Dossena, which lost to Sport Club Internacional in the final game. He did not suit up for Italy in the final match of that tournament. In January 2006, Rota was transferred from Pro Sesto to Manfredonia. By the end of that season, Manfredonia finished tenth, and Pro Sesto was relegated. Rota returned to Pro Sesto as a regular, though he missed the rest of the season.

In November 2007, Rota returned to Pro Sesto, playing eight games of the season. He was then transferred to Lugano of Swiss Challenge League in 2008. In 2009, Rota returned to Pro Sesto, but the club went bankrupt and finished last in the 2009–10 Lega Pro Seconda Divisione.

=== Philippines ===
In October 2013, Rota showed interest in playing in the United Football League to have more chances of being selected by the Philippines national football team. He signed with Stallion FC in January 2014.

In January 2017, Ceres-Negros announced that they had signed Rota, along with few other players, to play for the club ahead of the 2017 AFC Cup. He went on to join Davao Aguilas later in the year to play in the Philippines Football League (PFL).

Rota joined PFL club Kaya–Iloilo in February 2019. He retired from football at age 41 on December 11, 2025, after playing Kaya's 2025–26 AFC Champions League Two group stage match against the Pohang Steelers.

== International career ==
=== Italy ===
Rota represented the Italy U20 Lega Pro team at the 2005–06 Mirop Cup.

=== Philippines ===
Rota received his first call up for the Philippines national football team in February 2014, making his international debut in a friendly match against Malaysia on March 1, 2014. He scored his first international goal in the 2014 AFC Challenge Cup group stage match against Laos on 22 May 2014.

In August 2016, Rota suffered a serious ACL tear that would rule him out for the rest of the year, including the 2016 AFF Championship in which the Philippines were the host.

Rota returned in the 2019 AFC Asian Cup qualifiers and was part of the team which won against the final qualifier match against Tajikistan, which secured a berth for the Philippines in the 2019 AFC Asian Cup.

His final cap for the national team was in June 2022 window for the 2023 AFC Asian Cup qualifiers.

== Personal life ==
Since his return to the Philippines in 2014, Rota makes a point of volunteering at the orphanage where he grew up. Rota is an A.C. Milan fan, and although he fluently speaks Italian, he has difficulty speaking English and Filipino. Rota has multiple tattoos, including the outline of the Philippines archipelago and the names of his sister, adopted mother and father on his right forearm and a prayer and Sister May's name on his left forearm.

Rota's biography has been depicted in the film Journeyman Finds Home: The Simone Rota Story, which was directed by Albert Almendralejo and Maricel Cariaga. The film which had its Philippine premiere on February 28, 2018, also tackled the search for Rota's biological mother.

== Career statistics ==
=== International ===
Scores and results list the Philippines' goal tally first.

#	Date	Venue	Opponent	Score	Result	Competition
1.	22 May 2014	Addu Football Stadium, Addu City, Maldives	Laos	1–0	2–0	2014 AFC Challenge Cup
2.	22 November 2014	Mỹ Đình National Stadium, Hanoi, Vietnam	Laos	1–1	4–1	2014 AFF Suzuki Cup

== Honors ==
Kaya–Iloilo

- Philippines Football League: 2022–23
