= 2024 Stallion Laguna F.C. season =

Stallion Laguna
2024 season
- Owner: Filbert Alquiros
- Head Coach: Ernest Nierras
- Stadium: Biñan Football Stadium
- Philippines Football League: 3rd
- All statistics correct as of April 4, 2024.

The 2024 season will be Stallion Laguna's 6th season in both the Copa Paulino Alcantara and Philippines Football League, having been a founding member when it was established in 2017.

The previous season saw the club finish 3rd overall in the Philippines Football League after both United City and the Azkals Development Team withdrew before the season's end. As a result, the club qualified for the 2023–24 AFC Cup for the very first time. However, the club finished bottom of Group G, losing two games to both Bali United and Macarthur FC, though it got its first-ever point with a 2–2 draw against Malaysia's Terengganu FC. In the 2023 edition of the Copa Paulino Alcantara, the club was knocked out in the semifinals by eventual champions Kaya–Iloilo. Due to Liga Futbol Inc.'s relaxing of foreigner regulations, the club let go of many of its older core players and brought in a large number of foreign players, including Copa Sudamericana champion Ezequiel Cirigliano, and Brazilians Gabriel Silva, Magson Dourado, and Théo, The club also managed to keep forward Griffin McDaniel despite interest from Saudi First Division League, A-League, Malaysia Super League, and USL Championship teams.

== Squad ==
As of 4 April 2024

Squad No.	Name	Nationality	Date of birth (age)	Previous club
Goalkeepers
1	Alfredo Cortez	(United States)	12 September 1998 (age 27)	(United States) Chiriaco FC
12	Hayeson Pepito	(Philippines)	1 December 1993 (age 32)	(Philippines) National University
25	Vicente Valdez III	(Philippines)	5 September 2001 (age 24)	(Philippines) Maharlika Taguig
Defenders
2	Miguel de Mesa	(Philippines)	22 February 2002 (age 23)	University of the Philippines
3	Matthew Nierras	(Philippines) (United States)	6 February 1993 (age 32)	(Philippines) De La Salle University
4	Hayato Kame	(Japan)	19 July 1990 (age 35)	(Mongolia) Khovd
5	Charles Pickering	(Philippines) (New Zealand)	25 December 2001 (age 24)	(Philippines) Azkals Development Team
13	Gabriel Silva	(Brazil) (United States)	1 January 1996 (age 30)	(Brazil) Legião
14	Angelo Marasigan	(Philippines) (Belgium)	14 May 1992 (age 33)	(Philippines) United City
21	Paolo Pavone	(Philippines) (United States)	6 October 1999 (age 26)	(United States) El Farolito
26	Ken Pryde	(Philippines) (England)	19 March 2001 (age 24)	(United States) Duluth
34	Abraham Placito	(United States)	9 February 1994 (age 31)	(United States) Golden State Force
Midfielders
6	Ezequiel Cirigliano	(Argentina) (Italy)	24 January 1992 (age 33)	(Italy) Albalonga
9	Ruben Doctora	(Philippines)	17 April 1986 (age 39)	(Philippines) Union Internacional Manila
17	Spencer Galasa	(Philippines)	4 January 1998 (age 28)	(Philippines) Manila Digger
19	Julian Stifano	(United States) (Uruguay)	5 October 1998 (age 27)	(Costa Rica) SoccerViza
22	Jesus Salazar	(United States)	28 July 2001 (age 24)	(United States) University of Portland
23	Leonardo Nogueira	(Brazil)	23 July 1996 (age 29)	(United States) Cal State LA
24	Jo Bedia	(Philippines)	13 April 1995 (age 30)	(Philippines) De La Salle University
31	Christian Schaffner	(Philippines) (United States)	25 September 2000 (age 25)	(Philippines) Maharlika Taguig
68	Jacob Peña	(Philippines)	22 November 2002 (age 23)	(Canada) Douglas College
77	Aoi Isami	(Japan)	15 September 1995 (age 30)	(Japan) BTOP Hokkaido
Forwards
7	Théo	(Brazil)	19 April 2000 (age 25)	(Brazil) VOCEM
8	Griffin McDaniel	(Philippines) (United States)	30 March 2000 (age 25)	(Philippines) California Baptist University
10	Cristián Ivanobski	(Argentina) (North Macedonia)	11 February 1990 (age 35)	(United States) Los Angeles Force
11	Juan Trujillo	(Mexico)	5 October 1999 (age 26)	(Mexico) Cocodrilos
33	Junior Ngong Sam	(Cameroon)	17 February 1998 (age 27)	(Philippines) Mendiola 1991
88	Magson Dourado	(Brazil)	22 March 1992 (age 33)	(Thailand) Khon Kaen

== Transfers ==
Note: Flags indicate national team as defined under FIFA eligibility rules. Players may hold more than one non-FIFA nationality.

=== In ===
Date	Pos.	Nat.	Name	From	Ref.
Pre-season
January 12	GK	(United States)	Alfredo Cortez	(United States) Chiriaco FC	
January 14	FW	(Brazil)	Théo	(Brazil) VOCEM	
January 17	MF	(United States)	Julian Stifano	(Costa Rica) SoccerViza	
January 19	MF	(Philippines)	Spencer Galasa	(Philippines) Manila Digger	
January 26	MF	(Brazil)	Leonardo Nogueira	Free agent	
January 30	DF	(Brazil)	Gabriel Silva	(Brazil) Legião	
January 31	DF	(Cameroon)	Junior Ngong Sam	(Philippines) Mendiola 1991	
February 12	MF	(Argentina)	Ezequiel Cirigliano	(Italy) Albalonga	
March 9	MF	(Japan)	Aoi Isami	(Japan) BTOP Hokkaido	
March 31	MF	(United States)	Jesus Salazar	(United States) University of Portland	
April 2	FW	(Brazil)	Magson Dourado	(Thailand) Khon Kaen	
April 2	DF	(Japan)	Hayato Kame	(Mongolia) Khovd	
April 2	DF	(Philippines)	Angelo Marasigan	Free agent	
April 2	DF	(Philippines)	Paolo Pavone	(United States) El Farolito	

=== Out ===
Date	Pos.	Nat.	Name	To	Ref.
Pre-season
January 13	MF	(United States)	Kraig Bonanken	Free agent	
February 1	DF	(Japan)	Reo Nakamura	Free agent	
February 16	DF	(Philippines)	Jordan Jarvis	(Philippines) One Taguig	
February 16	FW	(Japan)	Yuta Nomura	Free agent	
February 19	FW	(Philippines)	Zachary Ford	Free agent	
March 1	DF	(Philippines)	Michael Menzi	(Philippines) United City	
March 1	DF	(Philippines)	Jayvee Kallukaran	(Philippines) Loyola	
March 2	DF	(Philippines)	Kouichi Belgira	(Myanmar) Shan United	
March 6	MF	(Philippines)	Charlie Beaton	(Philippines) Loyola	
March 20	DF	(Philippines)	Miguel Mendoza	(Canada) Calgary Foothills	
April 2	MF	(Philippines)	Jorrel Aristorenas	(Philippines) Loyola	
April 2	DF	(Philippines)	Shirmar Felongco	(Mongolia) Bavarians FC	
April 2	GK	(Philippines)	Nelson Gasic	(Philippines) Manila Digger	
April 2	MF	(Philippines)	Nathan Rilloraza	(Chinese Taipei) Leopard Cat	
April 2	FW	(Philippines)	Johnny Toledo	Free agent	
April 3	DF	(Philippines)	Patrick Artes	(Philippines) One Taguig	

== Preseason and friendlies ==
Win Draw Loss

=== Friendlies ===
March 13, 2024 Friendly	Stallion Laguna	unknown	Kaya–Iloilo	Biñan
				Stadium: Biñan Football Stadium

March 15, 2024 Friendly	Maharlika Taguig	1–5	Stallion Laguna	Taguig
				Stadium: McKinley Hill Stadium

March 24, 2024 Friendly	Stalllion Laguna	1–0	Loyola	Carmona
	Magson			Stadium: PFF National Training Center

March 27, 2024 Friendly	United City	1–2	Stallion Laguna	Manila
			McDaniel	Stadium: Rizal Memorial Stadium

March 31, 2024 Friendly	Stallion Laguna	9–0	Manila Montet	Biñan
	McDaniel; Théo; Ngong Sam			Stadium: Biñan Football Stadium

== Competitions ==
=== Overview ===
Competition	First match	Last match	Starting round	Final position	Record							
Competition	First match	Last match	Starting round	Final position	Pld	W	D	L	GF	GA	GD	Win %
Philippines Football League	May 5, 2024	July 6, 2024	Matchday 1	TBD	14	10	2	2	65	12	+53	71.43
Total					14	10	2	2	65	12	+53	71.43

Last updated: July 5, 2024
Source: Competitions

=== Philippines Football League ===
==== Standings ====
Pos	Team	Pld	W	D	L	GF	GA	GD	Pts	Qualification
1	Kaya–Iloilo (Note: Assured a place in the AFC Champions League Two Group stage as 2023 Copa Paulino Alcantara Winners) (C)	14	13	1	0	82	5	+77	40	Qualification for 2024–25 AFC Champions League Two Group stage
2	Dynamic Herb Cebu	14	12	0	2	66	9	+57	36	Qualification for 2024–25 AFC Champions League Two Group stage
3	Stallion Laguna	14	10	2	2	65	12	+53	32	
4	Davao Aguilas	14	10	2	2	39	6	+33	32	
5	One Taguig	14	9	4	1	69	14	+55	31	
6	United City	14	9	3	2	51	13	+38	30	

Source: PFL
Rules for classification: 1) Points; 2) Goal difference; 3) Goals scored.
(C) Champions
Notes:

Results summary

Overall								Home						Away					
Pld	W	D	L	GF	GA	GD	Pts	W	D	L	GF	GA	GD	W	D	L	GF	GA	GD
14	10	2	2	65	12	+53	32	7	1	0	50	6	+44	3	1	2	15	6	+9

Last updated: July 5, 2024.
Source: PFL

==== Results by round ====
Round	1	2	3	4	5	6	7	8	9	10	11	12	13	14
Ground	A	H	H	H	H	A	H	H	A	H	H	A	A	A
Result	W	W	W	W	D	L	W	W	D	W	W	W	L	W
Position	1	2	1	1	2	5	4	3	3	3	3	3	3	3

Updated to match(es) played on July 5, 2024. Source: PFL
A = Away; H = Home; W = Win; D = Draw; L = Loss

==== Matches ====
April 6, 2024 1	DB Garelli United	0–7	Stallion Laguna	Manila
15:00 UTC+8			Magson 7'; McDaniel 13'; Silva 45+1'; Trujillo 59'; Stifano 79'; Ngong Sam 82', 87'	Stadium: Rizal Memorial Stadium

April 13, 2024 2	Stallion Laguna	5–0	Loyola	Manila
17:30 UTC+8	Trujillo 31', 48'; McDaniel 36'; Placito (yellow card) 58'; Ngong Sam 76', 83'; Bedia (yellow card) 90+4'		Kim Sung-min (yellow card) 45'	Stadium: Rizal Memorial Stadium

April 21, 2024 3	Stallion Laguna	13–0	Manila Montet	Manila
15:00 UTC+8	Magson 4', 35', 60'; McDaniel 8', 13', 37', 40', 45' (pen.); Silva 25'; Trujillo 49'; Bedia 65'; Ngong Sam 90+1', 90+2'			Stadium: Rizal Memorial Stadium

April 28, 2024 4	Stallion Laguna	6–0	Philippine Army	Manila
17:45 UTC+8	Magson (yellow card) 5', (goal) 25'; Pickering (yellow card) 18'; McDaniel 22', 38', 75'; Cirigliano (yellow card) 42'; Pryde 79'; Ngong Sam 86'		Bernardo (yellow card) 5'; Soriano (yellow card) 43'	Stadium: Rizal Memorial Stadium

May 5, 2024 5	Stallion Laguna	3–3	One Taguig	Manila
17:30 UTC+8	Pryde 4'; Silva (yellow card) 28'; McDaniel 45+3' (pen.); Ngong Sam 70'		Grogg 4', 54'; Hiraishi 65'	Stadium: Rizal Memorial Stadium

May 12, 2024 6	Davao Aguilas	1–0	Stallion Laguna	Manila
17:30 UTC+8	S. Sato (yellow card) 39'; Villareal (yellow card) 60'; D. Sato (yellow card) 64'; Dalapo 87'; Ouattara (yellow card) 90+8'		Schaffner (yellow card) 45+2'; Silva (yellow card) 64'; Salazar (yellow card) 78'	Stadium: Rizal Memorial Stadium

May 18, 2024 7	Stallion Laguna	6–1	Mendiola 1991	Manila
17:30 UTC+8	Trujillo 14', 73', 90+1'; Théo 51'; Magson 53'; McDaniel 69'		Sison (yellow card) 48'; J. Tañamor (yellow card) 66' (yellow-red card) 79'; See 90+3'	Stadium: Rizal Memorial Stadium

May 25, 2024 8	Stallion Laguna	2–1	Manila Digger	Manila
17:30 UTC+8	Peña (yellow card) 37'; McDaniel 45+4', 51' (pen.)		Marzan 2'; Crestal (yellow card) 44'; Jatta (yellow card) 46'	Stadium: Rizal Memorial Stadium

June 1, 2024 9	United City	1–1	Stallion Laguna	Manila
17:30 UTC+8	Limbo 39'; Menzi (yellow card) 47'		Schaffner (yellow card) 71'; Magson 83'; Silva (yellow card) 90+1'	Stadium: Rizal Memorial Stadium

June 8, 2024 10	Stallion Laguna	8–0	Philippine Air Force	Manila
17:30 UTC+8	Halm 15'; Cirigliano (yellow card) 30'; Trujillo 50', 51', 64', 68'; Placito (yellow card) 66'; Peña (yellow card) 73'; Magson 80'; Théo 86'; Ivanobski 90+1'		Belgira (yellow card) 45+1'; Albor (yellow card) 70'	Stadium: Rizal Memorial Stadium

June 16, 2024 11	Stallion Laguna	7–1	Tuloy	Manila
20:00 UTC+8	Marasigan 8', 45+2', (yellow card) 23'; McDaniel 18' (pen.), 84'; Pavone (yellow card) 40'; Magson 48'; Silva 59'; Placito (yellow card) 77'; Ngong Sam 90+3'		C. Saut 44'	Stadium: Rizal Memorial Stadium

June 22, 2024 12	Maharlika Taguig	0–3	Stallion Laguna	Manila
17:30 UTC+8	Gold (yellow card) 87'		Peña (yellow card) 28', (goal) 62'; Silva 47', 56', (yellow card) 81'	Stadium: Rizal Memorial Stadium

June 30, 2024 13	Kaya–Iloilo	3–2	Stallion Laguna	Manila
17:30 UTC+8	Melliza 45+1'; Menzi 57'; Gayoso (yellow card) 61', (goal) 88'; Park Yi-young (yellow card) 90+1'; Bedic (yellow card) 90+*'		McDaniel (yellow card) 51'; Gomez 70'; Placito 90+3', (yellow card) 90+7'	Stadium: Rizal Memorial Stadium

July 6, 2024 14	Dynamic Herb Cebu	1–2	Stallion Laguna	Talisay
17:00 UTC+8	Dabao (yellow card) 44'; Corsame (yellow card) 50'; Hama 90'; Zamoranho (yellow card) 90+2'		Trujillo (yellow card) 44'; Magson (yellow card) 50', (goal) 56'; McDaniel 60'; Gomez (yellow card) 81'	Stadium: Dynamic Herb Sports Complex
