= 2023–24 Loyola F.C. season =

Loyola
2023–24 season
- Owner: Randy Roxas
- Head coach: Roxy Dorlas
- Stadium: Rizal Memorial Stadium
- Philippines Football League: 8th
- Copa Paulino Alcantara: Group Stage
- All statistics correct as of 8 December 2023.

The 2023–24 season is Loyola's first season after ceasing its senior team operations in 2018. The club participated in the 2023 Copa Paulino Alcantara and the 2024 Philippines Football League.

== Kits ==
Home kits

(2023 CPA)	(2024 PFL)

Away kits

2023 CPA	2024 PFL

== Competitions ==
=== Copa Paulino Alcantara ===
Pos	Team	Pld	W	D	L	GF	GA	GD	Pts	Qualification	KAY	CFM	PAF	FEU	LOY	GAR
1	Kaya–Iloilo	5	5	0	0	40	2	+38	15	Quarter-finals	—	8–0	9–1	—	—	11–0
2	CF Manila	5	3	1	1	9	12	−3	10	Quarter-finals	—	—	3–1	—	—	3–2
3	Philippine Air Force	5	2	1	2	8	14	−6	7		—	—	—	2–2	3–0	—
4	Far Eastern University	5	1	3	1	10	10	0	6		1–5	1–1	—	—	—	4–0
5	Loyola	5	1	1	3	8	15	−7	4		0–7	0–2	—	2–2	—	—
6	Don Bosco Garelli	5	0	0	5	3	25	−22	0		—	—	0–1	—	1–6	—

==== Matches ====
16 July 2023 1	Loyola	0–2	CF Manila	Manila
18:30 UTC+8		Report	Umilin 75'; Panotes 82'	Stadium: Rizal Memorial Stadium; Referee: Meliton Pelayo

22 July 2023 2	Loyola	2–2	Far Eastern University	Manila
18:30 UTC+8	Montelibano 58'; Baña 63'	Report	Ae 27' (o.g.); Rey 44'	Stadium: Rizal Memorial Stadium; Referee: John Mike Basinang

31 July 2023 3	Philippine Air Force	3–0	Loyola	Manila
17:00 UTC+8	Ja. Delariarte 21'; Je. Delariarte 28', 90+5'	Report		Stadium: Rizal Memorial Stadium; Referee: John Mike Basinang

5 August 2023 4	Don Bosco Garelli	1–6	Loyola	Manila
16:00 UTC+8	Mahinay 28'		Baña 13'; Montelibano 29', 60', 75' (pen.); Anoh 82', 89'	Stadium: Rizal Memorial Stadium; Referee: Clifford Daypuyat

12 August 2023 5	Loyola	0–7	Kaya–Iloilo	Manila
18:30 UTC+8		Report	Sendra 11'; Arboleda 31', 42'; Baas 33', 50'; Sy 58'; Swainston 89'	Stadium: Rizal Memorial Stadium; Referee: Michael Barajas

=== Philippines Football League ===
Pos	Team	Pld	W	D	L	GF	GA	GD	Pts
5	One Taguig	14	9	4	1	69	14	+55	31
6	United City	14	9	3	2	51	13	+38	30
7	Manila Digger	14	8	0	6	35	25	+10	24
8	Loyola	14	5	1	8	32	45	−13	16
9	Maharlika Taguig	14	5	1	8	23	53	−30	16
10	Mendiola 1991	14	4	1	9	27	46	−19	13
11	DB Garelli United	14	4	0	10	15	85	−70	12

Source: PFL
Rules for classification: 1) Points; 2) Goal difference; 3) Goals scored.

==== Matches ====
6 April 2024 1	Dynamic Herb Cebu	4–0	Loyola	Talisay, Cebu
17:00 UTC+8	Sy 35', 49' (pen.); Ho-A-Tham 44', 60'			Stadium: Dynamic Herb Sports Complex

13 April 2024 2	Stallion Laguna	5–0	Loyola	Manila
17:30 UTC+8	Trujillo 31', 48'; McDaniel 36'; Ngong Sam 76', 83'			Stadium: Rizal Memorial Stadium

27 April 2024 3	Loyola	5–1	DB Garelli	Manila
15:30 UTC+8	Kobayashi 5'; Kante 43'; Kallukaran 54'; Baña 65'; Aristorenas 80'		Johnson 90+5' (pen.)	Stadium: Rizal Memorial Stadium

4 May 2024 4	Manila Digger	3–1	Loyola	Manila
15:00 UTC+8	Piñero 7'; Jatta 39'; Annan 67' (o.g.)		Kallukaran 90+3'	Stadium: Rizal Memorial Stadium

11 May 2024 5	Loyola	8–0	Manila Montet	Manila
15:30 UTC+8	Winter 21', 40'; Kallukaran 25'; Baña 44'; Beaton 45+3'; Aristorenas 70', 80'; Kante 73' (pen.)			Stadium: Rizal Memorial Stadium

19 May 2024 6	Philippine Army	3–4	Loyola	Manila
20:00 UTC+8	Celiz 28'; Ariola 41'; Soriano 90+2'		Kante 13'; Winter 59'; Anoh 80'; Aristorenas 90+7' (pen.)	Stadium: Rizal Memorial Stadium

25 May 2024 7	Loyola	5–1	Philippine Air Force	Manila
15:00 UTC+8	Winter 27'; Asare 38'; Acot 58'; Kallukaran 75'; Anoh 87'		Delariarte 70'	Stadium: Rizal Memorial Stadium

2 June 2024 8	Davao Aguilas	3–0	Loyola	Manila
20:30 UTC+8	Dalapo 6'; Unoki 8'; Bricenio 45+2'			Stadium: Rizal Memorial Stadium

9 June 2024 9	Maharlika Taguig	2–2	Loyola	Manila
17:30 UTC+8	del Rosario 8'; Basana 8'		Kim 45+2'; Sidibe 90+1'	Stadium: Rizal Memorial Stadium

15 June 2024 10	Loyola	5–1	Mendiola	Manila
20:00 UTC+8	Kim 3', 27'; Winter 50'; Baña 90'		Hajimehdi 25'	Stadium: Rizal Memorial Stadium

23 June 2024 11	Loyola	1–7	One Taguig	Manila
16:00 UTC+8	Winter 44'		Jahanbakhsh 45+1'; Shimomura 8', 23'; Amita 50'; Aldeguer 69', 79'; Bahadoran 90+2'	Stadium: Rizal Memorial Stadium

30 June 2024 12	Loyola	0–6	United City	Manila
15:00 UTC+8			Ngueukam 9'; Sendra 12', 39'; Bugas 63'; Hartmann 65'; Limbo 68'	Stadium: Rizal Memorial Stadium

6 July 2024 13	Tuloy	6–2	Loyola	Manila
15:00 UTC+8	Lupango 4', 11'; C. Saut 8'; Sajor 45+2'; Jalique 74'; S. Saut 77'		Anoh 38'; Harada 59'	Stadium: Rizal Memorial Stadium

13 July 2024 14	Loyola	0–3	Kaya–Iloilo	Manila
20:30 UTC+8			Diano 28'; Rota 31'; Bedic 37'	Stadium: Rizal Memorial Stadium

== Squads ==
=== Copa Paulino Alcantara squad ===
As of 23 July 2023

Note: Flags indicate national team as defined under FIFA eligibility rules; some limited exceptions apply. Players may hold more than one non-FIFA nationality.

No.	Pos.	Nation	Player
1	GK	PHI	Javi Coscolluela
2	GK	PHI	Matti Puno
3	DF	PHI	Thirdy Closa
4	DF	PHI	David Pahud
6	MF	PHI	Marcus Arias
7	MF	PHI	Sam Lim
8	MF	PHI	Jerard Astorga
9	MF	PHI	Ranzo Aljama
10	DF	PHI	Gabriel Vergara
11	FW	CIV	Franck Anoh
12	GK	PHI	Polo Tansingco
13	DF	PHI	Ziggy Ae
14	MF	PHI	Szymon Mercado
17	MF	PHI	Miguel Arias
18	GK	PHI	Pio Unlay
19	DF	PHI	Aaron Flores
20	DF	PHI	Nathan De Ocampo

No.	Pos.	Nation	Player
21	DF	PHI	Luis Sandejas
22	DF	PHI	Jethro Flores (captain)
23	MF	PHI	Rupert Baña
24	MF	PHI	Robbie Torres
26	FW	PHI	John Lumagbas
29	DF	PHI	Joem Logarta
42	DF	PHI	Jose Montelibano
44	DF	PHI	Marwan Pantusan
77	DF	PHI	Mateo Yuhico
87	MF	PHI	James Detera
88	MF	PHI	Rafael Plaza
—	MF	PHI	Mikel Maniquis
—	MF	PHI	Shaun Saludez

=== Philippines Football League squad ===
As of 18 July 2024

Note: Flags indicate national team as defined under FIFA eligibility rules; some limited exceptions apply. Players may hold more than one non-FIFA nationality.

No.	Pos.	Nation	Player
1	GK	PHI	Javier Coscolluela
3	DF	PHI	Thirdy Closa
4	DF	SEN	Alassane Wade
5	MF	PHI	Theodore Travis
6	MF	KOR	Kim Sung-min (captain)
7	MF	PHI	Charlie Beaton
8	MF	PHI	Jorrel Aristorenas
9	FW	CIV	Ousmane Sidibé
10	DF	PHI	Jayvee Kallukaran
11	FW	JPN	Takaya Harada
12	GK	GHA	Mohammed Ali
13	MF	PHI	Marco Cauyong
14	DF	PHI	Dyango Echter
15	DF	PHI	Joem Logarta
16	GK	GHA	Isaac Annan
17	DF	GHA	David Asare

No.	Pos.	Nation	Player
18	FW	GHA	Emmanuel Osei
19	DF	GHA	Isaac Acheampong
20	MF	JPN	Daisuke Kobayashi
21	FW	CMR	Boris Kante
22	MF	PHI	Roven Lumagbas
23	FW	PHI	Rupert Baña
24	MF	PHI	Vincent Saludo
25	DF	PHI	RM Lapitan
27	FW	PHI	Ian Chua
28	MF	PHI	Mauro Acot
29	FW	PHI	William Winter
31	GK	PHI	Mark Jones
32	FW	CIV	Franck Anoh
37	MF	PHI	Angelo Marasigan (on loan from Stallion Laguna)
72	DF	PHI	Brando Soliman (on loan from Stallion Laguna)
