= 2018 Stallion Laguna F.C. season =

Stallion Laguna
2018 season
- Head coach: Ernest Nierras
- Stadium: Biñan Football Stadium
- Philippines Football League: 4th (ongoing)
- Copa Paulino Alcantara: Group Stage (TBA)
- Top goalscorer: League: Carlo Polli (6); Jesus Melliza (6); All: Carlo Polli (6); Jesus Melliza (6)
Home colours	Away colours	Third colours
- All statistics correct as of 20 May 2018.

The 2018 season is Stallion Laguna's 2nd season in the top flight of Philippine football.

== Pre-season and friendlies ==
Win Draw Loss

=== Friendlies ===
2 February 2018	Stallion Laguna	2–3	JPV Marikina	Makati
	(2x)	Report	Kozawa; Suzuki	Stadium: Gatorade-Chelsea Bluepitch

14 February 2018	Stallion Laguna	2–1	JPV Marikina	Biñan
		Report		Stadium: Biñan Football Stadium

== Competitions ==
=== Overview ===
Competition	First match	Last match	Starting round	Final position	Record							
Competition	First match	Last match	Starting round	Final position	Pld	W	D	L	GF	GA	GD	Win %
Philippines Football League	4 April 2018	25 August 2018	Matchday 1	4th	25	12	3	10	46	39	+7	48.00
Copa Paulino Alcantara	15 September 2018	TBC	Group stage	TBC	0	0	0	0	0	0	+0	—
Total					25	12	3	10	46	39	+7	48.00

Last updated: 25 August 2018
Source: Competitions

=== Philippines Football League ===
Pos	Team	Pld	W	D	L	GF	GA	GD	Pts	Qualification or relegation
1	Ceres–Negros (C)	25	19	3	3	66	25	+41	60	Qualification for the AFC Champions League Preliminary Round 1 or AFC Cup Group Stage
2	Kaya–Iloilo	25	15	4	6	58	32	+26	49	
3	Davao Aguilas	25	11	6	8	52	39	+13	39	
4	Stallion Laguna	25	12	3	10	49	45	+4	36 (Note: Three points were deducted from Stallion Laguna due to the club's failure to comply with Liga Futbol Inc. Disciplinary Committee’s Decision No. 010318DC03.)	
5	JPV Marikina	25	7	2	16	46	63	−17	20 (Note: Three points were deducted from JPV Marikina due to the club's failure to comply with Liga Futbol Inc. Disciplinary Committee’s Decision No. 010318DC02.)	
6	Global Cebu	25	1	2	22	18	85	−67	5	

Source: Philippines Football League
Rules for classification: 1) Points; 2) Goal Difference; 3) Goals Scored
(C) Champions

==== Results summary ====
Overall								Home						Away					
Pld	W	D	L	GF	GA	GD	Pts	W	D	L	GF	GA	GD	W	D	L	GF	GA	GD
25	12	3	10	46	39	+7	36^{^{a}}	7	2	4	28	18	+10	5	1	6	18	21	−3

Last updated: 25 August 2018.
Source: Philippines Football League

Note:

- a Three points was deducted for Stallion Laguna from the league standing due to the club's failure to comply with Liga Futbol Inc. Disciplinary Committee’s Decision No. 010318DC03.

==== Results by round ====
Round	1	2	3	4	5	6	7	8	9	10	11	12	13	14	15	16	17	18	19	20	21	22	23	24	25
Ground	H	A	H	H	A	H	A	H	H	A	H	A	H	A	A	A	H	H	H	A	A	H	H	A	A
Result	L	W	L	W	L	W	W	L	L	W	W	L	W	L	L	L	W	W	D	W	W	W	D	D	L
Position	5	4	6	5	5	4	4	4	4	4	3	3	3	4	4	4	4	4	4	4	3	3	4	4	4

Updated to match(es) played on 25 August 2018. Source: Philippines Football League
A = Away; H = Home; W = Win; D = Draw; L = Loss

==== Matches ====
11 March 2018 1	Stallion Laguna	1–2	JPV Marikina	Biñan
16:00 UTC+8	Tuason 44'	Report	Ko Kyung-joon 8' (o.g.); Altiche 90+3'	Stadium: Biñan Football Stadium

4 April 2018 2	Global Cebu	1–2	Stallion Laguna	Biñan^{a}
16:00 UTC+8	Roberts 60'	Report	Arboleda 56'; Polli 78'	Stadium: Biñan Football Stadium

8 April 2018 3	Stallion Laguna	0–1	Davao Aguilas	Biñan
16:00 UTC+8		Report	J. Younghusband 38'	Stadium: Biñan Football Stadium

14 April 2018 4	Stallion Laguna	3–1	Kaya–Iloilo	Biñan
16:00 UTC+8	Polli 52' (pen.); Melliza 70'; Arboleda 90+4'	Report	Tanton 15'	Stadium: Biñan Football Stadium

22 April 2018 5	Kaya–Iloilo	4–1	Stallion Laguna	Makati^{b}
16:00 UTC+8	Bedic 4'; Mintah 18', 42'; Soriano 30'	Report	Polli 50'	Stadium: University of Makati Stadium

6 May 2018 6	Stallion Laguna	3–0	Davao Aguilas	Biñan
16:00 UTC+8	Cordova (red card) 65'; Polli 69'; Melliza 76', 90+2'	Report		Stadium: Biñan Football Stadium

19 May 2018 7	JPV Marikina	1–4	Stallion Laguna	Biñan^{c}
19:00 UTC+8	Moriyasu 52'		Melliza 23'; Ko 55'; Tuason 75'; Sy 90+4'	Stadium: Biñan Football Stadium

26 May 2018 8	Stallion Laguna	2–3	Ceres–Negros	Biñan
16:00 UTC+8	Melliza 10', 25'		Schröck 55'; Marañón 58', 63'	Stadium: Biñan Football Stadium

2 June 2018 9	Stallion Laguna	2–6	Ceres–Negros	Biñan
16:00 UTC+8	Sy 73'; Arboleda 77'		Reichelt 9'; Porteria 11', 71'; Mi. Ott 53', 57'; Ingreso 64'	Stadium: Biñan Football Stadium

6 June 2018 10	JPV Marikina	1–4	Stallion Laguna	Biñan^{c}
16:00 UTC+8	Kozawa 79'		Ko 56'; Sy 62'; Arboleda 81'; Alquiros 87'	Stadium: Biñan Football Stadium

10 June 2018 11	Stallion Laguna	2–1	Global Cebu	Biñan
16:00 UTC+8	Regala 23'; Doctora 74'		Valmayor 87'	Stadium: Biñan Football Stadium

16 June 2018 12	Davao Aguilas	5–0	Stallion Laguna	Manila^{d}
16:00 UTC+8	Kim 3', 13'; Rota 7'; De Bruycker 51'; De Jong 85'			Stadium: Rizal Memorial Stadium

20 June 2018 13	Stallion Laguna	4–0	Global Cebu	Biñan
15:00 UTC+8	Sy 21'; Polli 28', 90+1'; Arboleda 57'			Stadium: Biñan Football Stadium

27 June 2018 14	Ceres–Negros	2–0	Stallion Laguna	Bacolod
19:00 UTC+8				Stadium: Panaad Park and Stadium

1 July 2018 15	Ceres–Negros	2–0	Stallion Laguna	Bacolod
19:00 UTC+8				Stadium: Panaad Park and Stadium

4 July 2018 16	Kaya–Iloilo	4–2	Stallion Laguna	Iloilo City
16:00 UTC+8				Stadium: Iloilo Sports Complex

14 July 2018 17	Stallion Laguna	3–2	JPV Marikina	Biñan
15:00 UTC+8				Stadium: Biñan Football Stadium

21 July 2018 18	Stallion Laguna	2–0	Kaya–Iloilo	Biñan
15:00 UTC+8				Stadium: Biñan Football Stadium

28 July 2018 19	Stallion Laguna	1–1	Davao Aguilas	Biñan
15:00 UTC+8	Arboleda 90+3'		Dos Santos 38'	Stadium: Biñan Football Stadium

4 August 2018 20	Global Cebu	1–2	Stallion Laguna	Carmona^{a}
15:00 UTC+8	Beaton 1'		Alquiros 5'; Bugas 79'

9 August 2018 21	Global Cebu	0–3^{e} Awarded	Stallion Laguna	Biñan^{a}
				Stadium: Biñan Football Stadium

15 August 2018 22	Stallion Laguna	4–0	JPV Marikina	Biñan
15:00 UTC+8				Stadium: Biñan Football Stadium

19 August 2018 23	Stallion Laguna	1–1	Kaya–Iloilo	Biñan
15:00 UTC+8				Stadium: Biñan Football Stadium

22 August 2018 24	Davao Aguilas	2–2	Stallion Laguna	Manila^{d}
16:00 UTC+8	De Jong 4'; Hall (yellow card) 35'; Linatoc 50' (o.g.)		Sy 64', 67'	Stadium: Rizal Memorial Stadium

25 August 2018 25	Ceres–Negros	4–1	Stallion Laguna	Bacolod
17:30 UTC+8	Marañon 32', 89'; Steuble 49'; Powell 67'		Alquiros 50'	Stadium: Panaad Stadium

Notes:

a Due to the bad condition of the pitch in the Cebu City Sports Complex, both teams agreed to play the matches in Stallion's home venue Biñan Football Stadium or in neutral venue PFF National Training Centre.
b Due to the unavailability of Iloilo Sports Complex, the match will be played in their previous "home" venue University of Makati Stadium.
c Due to the unavailability of Marikina Sports Complex, both teams agreed to play all the matches in Stallion's home venue Biñan Football Stadium.
d Due to the unavailability of Davao del Norte Sports Complex, both matches will be played in the neutral venue Rizal Memorial Stadium.
d Originally schedule on 8 July but the match was abandoned by Global Cebu. Stallion Laguna won 3–0 by default.

=== Copa Paulino Alcantara ===
Pos	Team	Pld	W	D	L	GF	GA	GD	Pts	Qualification	DAV	STA	CER
1	Davao Aguilas	4	3	1	0	9	2	+7	10	Semi-finals	—	0–0	2–1
2	Stallion Laguna	4	1	1	2	4	6	−2	4	Semi-finals	0–4	—	3–0
3	Ceres–Negros	4	1	0	3	4	9	−5	3		1–3	2–1	—

Source: LFI

==== Group stage ====
15 September 2018 1	Stallion Laguna	3–0	Ceres–Negros	Biñan
16:00 UTC+8	Doctora 24'; Melliza 41', 52'			Stadium: Biñan Football Stadium

19 September 2018 2	Ceres–Negros	2–1	Stallion Laguna	Manila^{b}
19:00 UTC+8	Powell 56'; M. Ott 84'		Arboleda 40'	Stadium: Rizal Memorial Stadium

26 September 2018 3	Davao Aguilas	0–0	Stallion Laguna	Manila^{c}
16:00 UTC+8				Stadium: Rizal Memorial Stadium

17 October 2018 4	Stallion Laguna	0–4	Davao Aguilas	Biñan
15:00 UTC+8			P. Younghusband 40', 83'; Kim S.M. 70', 84'	Stadium: Biñan Football Stadium

Notes:

a Due to the unavailability of Biñan Football Stadium, the match will be played in neutral venue Rizal Memorial Stadium.
b Due to the unavailability of Panaad Stadium, the match will be played in neutral venue Rizal Memorial Stadium.
c Due to the unavailability of Davao del Norte Sports Complex, the match will be played in neutral venue Rizal Memorial Stadium.

==== Knockout stage ====
21 October 2018 Semi-Final	Kaya FC–Iloilo	3–2	Stallion Laguna	Iloilo City
14:30 UTC+8	Lopez Mendy 3', 15', 47'		Arboleda 20'; Polli 43'	Stadium: Iloilo Sports Complex

== League squad ==
As of 23 June 2018.

Note: Flags indicate national team as defined under FIFA eligibility rules; some limited exceptions apply. Players may hold more than one non-FIFA nationality.

No.	Pos.	Nation	Player
1	GK	PHI	Benito Rosalia
2	GK	PHI	Hayeson Pepito
3	DF	PHI	Matthew Nierras
4	MF	PHI	Terence Linatoc
6	MF	PHI	Nathan Alquiros
7	FW	PHI	Yannick Tuason
8	MF	PHI	Bervic Italia
9	MF	PHI	Ruben Doctora (captain)
10	FW	PHI	Jesus Melliza
12	MF	PHI	Nicholas Ferrer
13	DF	PHI	Jason Cordova
14	DF	KOR	Ko Kyung-joon

No.	Pos.	Nation	Player
17	FW	SEN	Abou Mohamed Sy
18	DF	PHI	Yuki Ishihara
19	MF	SUI	Carlo Polli
20	DF	PHI	Reynald Villareal
21	MF	PHI	Farbod Mahmudi
22	FW	PHI	Anton Amistoso
23	DF	PHI	Gerald Layumas
27	MF	PHI	Fitch Arboleda
29	DF	PHI	Darwin Regala
-	MF	PHI	Paolo Bugas
-	MF	PHI	OJ Clariño
-	FW	PHI	Gino Clariño

== Transfers ==
=== Pre-season transfer ===
==== In ====
Position	Player	Transferred From
	(Philippines) (Iran) Farbod Mahmudi	
	(Philippines) Anton Amistoso	(Philippines) Stallion Laguna B
	(Japan) Ken Kensei	

=== Mid-season transfer ===
==== In ====
Position	Player	Transferred From
MF	(Philippines) Paolo Bugas	(Philippines) Global Cebu F.C.
FW	(Philippines) Gino Clariño	
MF	(Philippines) OJ Clariño	(Philippines) Global Cebu F.C.

==== Out ====
Position	Player	Transferred To
FW	(Switzerland) Gabriele Mascazzini	(Australia) South West Phoenix FC
