= 2017 Stallion Laguna F.C. season =

Stallion Laguna
2017 season
- Head coach: Ernest Nierras
- Stadium: Biñan Football Stadium
- PFL: 5th (Regular Season)
- Stalion Cup: Champion
Home colours	Away colours	Third colours
- All statistics correct as of 16 December 2017.

The 2017 season is Stallion Laguna's 1st season in the top flight of Philippines football.

== Preseason and friendlies ==
Win Draw Loss

=== Stallion Invitational Cup ===
March 15, 2017 GS Grp. A	Stallion Laguna (Philippines)	6–0	(Philippines) Davao Aguilas	Biñan
		Report		Stadium: Biñan Football Stadium

March 18, 2017 GS Grp. A	Stallion Laguna (Philippines)	3–0	(Philippines) Global Cebu	Biñan
	Doctora 9', 71'; Nathan Alquiros 55'	Report		Stadium: Biñan Football Stadium

March 21, 2017 Semifinal	Stallion Laguna (Philippines)	unknown	(United States) Belmont-Deft Touch	Biñan
				Stadium: Biñan Football Stadium

March 24, 2017 Final	Stallion Laguna (Philippines)	2–0 (a.e.t.)	(Philippines) Loyola Meralco Sparks	Biñan
	Rio Tamiya 105'; Thomert Nana 120'	Report		Stadium: Biñan Football Stadium

== Competitions ==
=== Philippines Football League ===
Pos	Team	Pld	W	D	L	GF	GA	GD	Pts	Qualification or relegation
1	Meralco Manila	28	17	7	4	43	33	+10	58	Qualification for finals series
2	Ceres–Negros (C)	28	17	6	5	76	27	+49	57	Qualification for finals series
3	Kaya FC–Makati	28	14	5	9	52	35	+17	47	Qualification for finals series
4	Global Cebu	28	13	8	7	47	37	+10	47	Qualification for finals series
5	Stallion Laguna	28	9	8	11	39	49	−10	35	
6	JPV Marikina	28	9	6	13	42	48	−6	33	
7	Davao Aguilas	28	4	10	14	35	56	−21	22	
8	Ilocos United	28	1	6	21	24	73	−49	9	

Source: Philippines Football League
Rules for classification: 1) Points; 2) Goal Difference; 3) Goals Scored
(C) Champions

==== Regular season ====
6 May 2017 1	Stallion Laguna	1–5	Meralco Manila	Biñan
16:00 UTC+8				Stadium: Biñan Football Stadium

21 May 2017 2	Stallion Laguna	1–1	Global Cebu	Biñan
16:00 UTC+8				Stadium: Biñan Football Stadium

31 May 2017 3	Stallion Laguna	0–4	JPV Marikina	Biñan
16:00 UTC+8				Stadium: Biñan Football Stadium

4 June 2017 4	Kaya FC–Makati	1–0	Stallion Laguna	Makati
16:00 UTC+8				Stadium: University of Makati Stadium

18 June 2017 5	Stallion Laguna	0–0	Davao Aguilas	Biñan
16:00 UTC+8				Stadium: Biñan Football Stadium

24 June 2017 6	Meralco Manila	1–1	Stallion Laguna	Manila
16:00 UTC+8				Stadium: Rizal Memorial Stadium

28 June 2017 7	Ceres–Negros	5–1	Stallion Laguna	Bacolod
16:00 UTC+8				Stadium: Panaad Stadium

1 July 2017 8	Ceres–Negros	5–2	Stallion Laguna	Bacolod
16:00 UTC+8				Stadium: Panaad Stadium

5 July 2017 9	Stallion Laguna	1–3	Kaya FC–Makati	Biñan
16:00 UTC+8				Stadium: Biñan Football Stadium

9 July 2017 10	Global Cebu	3–0	Stallion Laguna	Cebu City
19:00 UTC+8				Stadium: Cebu City Sports Complex

16 July 2017 11	Ilocos United	1–1	Stallion Laguna	Bantay^{a}
16:00 UTC+8				Stadium: Quirino Stadium

19 July 2017 12	JPV Marikina	0–2	Stallion Laguna	Manila^{b}
16:00 UTC+8				Stadium: Rizal Memorial Stadium

23 July 2017 13	JPV Marikina	1–2	Stallion Laguna	Manila^{b}
16:00 UTC+8				Stadium: Rizal Memorial Stadium

26 July 2017 14	Stallion Laguna	1–0	Ilocos United	Biñan
19:00 UTC+8				Stadium: Biñan Football Stadium

30 July 2017 15	Stallion Laguna	1–1	Kaya FC–Makati	Biñan
19:00 UTC+8				Stadium: Biñan Football Stadium

12 August 2017 16	Stallion Laguna	2–3	Meralco Manila	Biñan
16:00 UTC+8				Stadium: Biñan Football Stadium

16 August 2017 17	Ilocos United	1–4	Stallion Laguna	Bantay^{a}
19:00 UTC+8				Stadium: Quirino Stadium

25 August 2017 18	Stallion Laguna	2–1	Global Cebu	Biñan
16:00 UTC+8				Stadium: Biñan Football Stadium

10 September 2017 19	Stallion Laguna	5–0	Ilocos United	Biñan
16:00 UTC+8				Stadium: Biñan Football Stadium

17 September 2017 20	Stallion Laguna	1–0	JPV Marikina	Biñan
16:00 UTC+8				Stadium: Biñan Football Stadium

23 September 2017 21	Kaya FC–Makati	4–0	Stallion Laguna	Makati
16:00 UTC+8				Stadium: University of Makati Stadium

30 September 2017 22	Stallion Laguna	2–2	Davao Aguilas	Biñan
16:00 UTC+8				Stadium: Biñan Football Stadium

14 October 2017 23	Meralco Manila	0–0	Stallion Laguna	Manila
16:00 UTC+8				Stadium: Rizal Memorial Stadium

21 October 2017 24	Stallion Laguna	0–1	Ceres–Negros	Biñan
16:00 UTC+8			Marañón 28'	Stadium: Biñan Football Stadium

25 October 2017 25	Stallion Laguna	2–0	Ceres–Negros	Biñan
16:00 UTC+8	Mascazzini 45+1'; Doctora 60'			Stadium: Biñan Football Stadium

29 October 2017 26	Davao Aguilas	2–2	Stallion Laguna	Tagum
16:00 UTC+8				Stadium: Davao del Norte Sports Complex

2 November 2017 27	Global Cebu	4–3	Stallion Laguna	Manila^{c}
16:00 UTC+8				Stadium: Rizal Memorial Stadium

5 November 2017 28	Davao Aguilas	0–2	Stallion Laguna	Tagum
16:00 UTC+8				Stadium: Davao del Norte Sports Complex

Note:

- a The home stadium of the club is located in Bantay, Ilocos Sur, a nearby town of Vigan. For administrative and marketing purposes, the home city of Ilocos United is designated as "Vigan"
- b Because of the ongoing works in the Marikina Sports Complex, the team will play its first few league games at the Biñan Football Stadium and Rizal Memorial Stadium and will have to groundshare with Stallion Laguna and Meralco Manila, respectively.
- c Because of the unavailability of the Cebu City Sports Complex, the match was played instead in Rizal Memorial Stadium, Manila.

== League squad ==
As of 30 May 2017.

Note: Flags indicate national team as defined under FIFA eligibility rules; some limited exceptions apply. Players may hold more than one non-FIFA nationality.

No.	Pos.	Nation	Player
—	DF	PHI	Bervic Italia
—	DF	PHI	Matthew Nierras
—	FW	PHI	Terence Linatoc
—	FW	PHI	Nathan Alquiros
—	FW	PHI	Yannick Tuason
—	FW	PHI	Ruben Doctora (captain)
—	FW	PHI	Joshua Beloya
—	GK	PHI	Andy Tan
—	DF	SEN	Christian Nana
—	MF	PHI	Arnel Casil
—	GK	CIV	Roland Sadia
—	MF	PHI	Fitch Arboleda
—	MF	PHI	Jay Soberano
—	MF	JPN	Ryota Ishikawa

No.	Pos.	Nation	Player
—	FW	JPN	Ryo Tamiya
—	GK	PHI	Benito Rosalia
—	DF	PHI	Jose Montelibano
—	DF	PHI	Darwin Regala
—	DF	PHI	Reynald Villareal
—	DF	JPN	Yusuke Yamagata
—	DF	PHI	Yuki Verzosa
—	MF	PHI	Loren Urtula
—	MF	PHI	Ronnie Aguisanda
—	MF	PHI	Iñigo Gonzales
—	MF	PHI	Jesus Melliza
—	FW	JPN	Takumi Ozawa
—	FW	PHI	Nicholas Ferrer
—	FW	PHI	Julian Miranda
