= Hamed Hajimehdi =

Iranian footballer (born 1988)

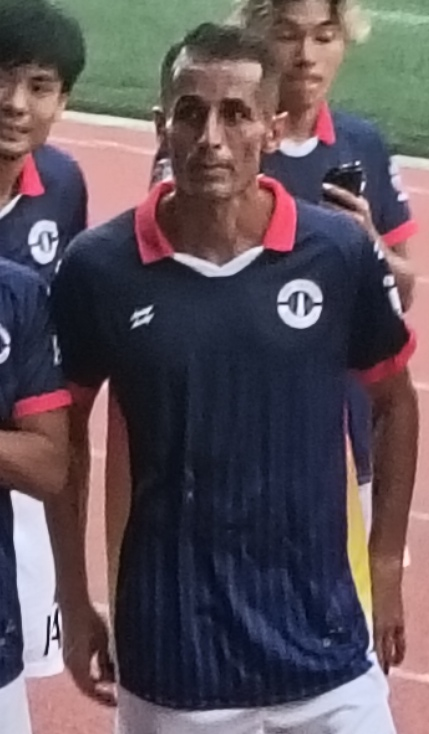
- Hajimehdi in 2025

Personal information
- Full name: Hamed Hajimehdi
- Date of birth: January 19, 1988 (age 38)
- Place of birth: Tehran, Iran
- Height: 1.81 m (5 ft 11 in)
- Position: Midfielder

Team information
- Current team: One Taguig
- Number: 10

Senior career*
Years	Team	Apps	(Gls)
- Persepolis (futsal)
2012–2013	Pasargad		
2013	Inter Manila		
2014	Stallion	9	(3)
2014	Global	5	(0)
2015–2016	Pachanga Diliman	12	(8)
2016–2017	Laos	17	(4)
2019–2022	Mendiola 1991	37	(6)
2022–2023	Stallion Laguna	6	(1)
2023–2025	Mendiola 1991	33	(13)
2025–	One Taguig	6	(1)
- * Club domestic league appearances and goals as of March 11, 2026

Hamed Hajimehdi (Persian: حامد حاجی مهدی; born 19 January 1988) is an Iranian professional footballer and former futsal player who plays as a midfielder for One Taguig of the Philippines Football League. He has mainly played for various clubs in the Philippines.

== Football career ==
=== Pasargad ===
Hajimehdi first played futsal in various countries, playing for the futsal team of Persepolis in his home country of Iran and also the UAE and Thailand.

In 2012, he and his brother Hassan signed for Pasargard FC in the Philippines, who were participating in the United Football League. In 2013, Pasargad made it to the final of the 2012–13 PFF National Men's Club Championship, but lost to Ceres–La Salle. He left after two seasons at the club.

=== Stallion and Global ===
After playing one season with Union Internacional Manila, he joined then-UFL champions Stallion. After half a season with the team, he joined Global, where he won the 2014 United Football League.

=== Pachanga Diliman ===
In 2015, he joined Pachanga Diliman alongside other Iranian players. He had his most successful club stint so far, notching 8 goals that season.

=== Laos FC ===
For the 2016 United Football League he left Pachanga as they withdrew from the UFL to play for newly promoted side Laos FC.

=== Mendiola 1991 ===
In 2019, he joined newly formed Mendiola 1991 that would be having its first-ever season in the professionalized Philippines Football League. He would play three seasons there, guiding the club to a semifinal finish at the 2019 Copa Paulino Alcantara.

=== Reuniting with Stallion ===
Hajimehdi would reunite with coach Ernest Nierras and Stallion, now renamed Stallion Laguna, at the onset of the 2022–23 Philippines Football League. He scored his first goal for the club on matchday 2 in a 2–1 win over Maharlika Manila and notched an assist, though his season would be hampered by injuries.

=== Return to Mendiola ===
In early 2023, Stallion would confirm his departure from the club as he rejoined Mendiola, though injuries kept him on the bench until the 2023 edition of the Copa Paulino Alcantara.

== Futsal career ==
Although his latter career saw him play football, Hajimehdi began it playing for the futsal team of Iranian side Persepolis. When he went to the Philippines he would also join futsal leagues, being one of the foreign players of Bohemian SC.

Hajimehdi would play 7's football, and represented the National Capital Region in the Philam 7's Kampeon Cup. In 2018, a team composed of various foreigners including Hajimehdi nicknamed "Persepolis" won the Philippine division of Neymar Jr's Five World Finals, representing the country in Brazil.

== Coaching career ==
Aside from playing, Hajimehdi is also a coach, mostly for youth sides. Alongside Jason de Jong, he played for and coached Bohemian SC. He was coaching youth team FC Arayat in 2023.

He also led the Philippine national seven-a-side team also known as the "Azkals" to a runner-up finish in the 2024 Asia 7s tournament.

== Personal life ==
Hajimehdi was born in Tehran, Iran. His brother, Hassan, also played alongside him at Pasargad.

In 2020, after Typhoon Ulysses, he was one of several professional footballers who auctioned his jersey off in a fundraiser for the victims.
