= Yusuke Yamagata =

Japanese footballer

Personal information
- Date of birth: 14 July 1986 (age 40)
- Place of birth: Japan
- Height: 1.81 m (5 ft 11 1/2 in)
- Position: Defender

Team information
- Current team: Stallion Laguna

Youth career
- Chuo University

Senior career*
Years	Team	Apps	(Gls)
2009–2011	SP Kyoto		
2011–2012	Sagamihara		
- Build Bright United
- Lanexang United
2016	Shillong Lajong	4	(0)
2017–	Stallion Laguna	0	(0)
- * Club domestic league appearances and goals as of 13 February 2016

Yusuke Yamagata (山形 雄介, Yamagata Yūsuke; born 14 July 1986) is a Japanese professional footballer who plays as a defender for Philippines Football League club Stallion Laguna.

== Career ==
Yamagata started his career in the Japanese lower divisions with SP Kyoto and Sagamihara. He soon moved to Cambodia, where he played for Build Bright United. He also played in Laos for Lanexang United.

On 31 December 2015, it was announced that Yamagata had signed with Indian I-League side, Shillong Lajong. He made his debut for the club on 28 January 2016 against Salgaocar. He played the full match as Shillong Lajong won 1–0.

== Indian statistics ==
As of 13 February 2016

Club	Season	League			League Cup		Domestic Cup		Continental		Total	
Club	Season	Division	Apps	Goals	Apps	Goals	Apps	Goals	Apps	Goals	Apps	Goals
Shillong Lajong	2015–16	I-League	4	0	—	—	0	0	—	—	4	0
Career total			4	0	0	0	0	0	0	0	4	0
