= Amir Memari =

Iranian footballer

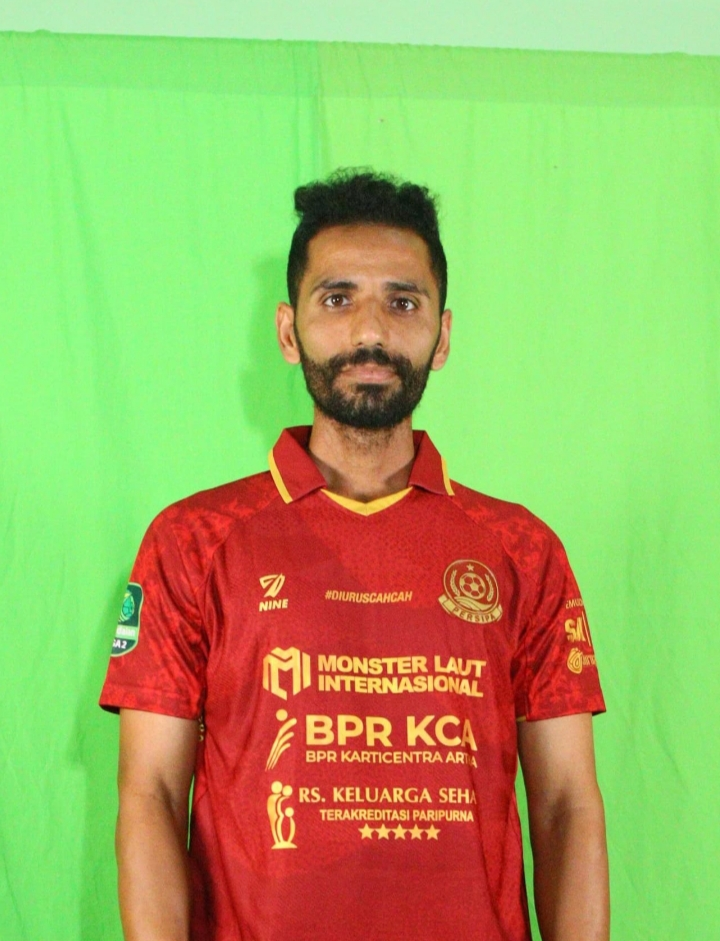

Personal information
- Full name: Amri Memari Manesh
- Date of birth: 9 April 1993 (age 33)
- Place of birth: Behbahan, Iran
- Height: 1.77 m (5 ft 10 in)
- Position: Forward

Team information
- Current team: Samail
- Number: 77

Youth career
- 2014: Fajr U20

Senior career*
Years	Team	Apps	(Gls)
2014–2015	Shahrdari Yasouj	10	(5)
2015–2016	Khayr Vahdat	20	(9)
2019–2020	Panjshir	17	(6)
2021	Dushanbe-83	12	(4)
2021	Khalij Fars	6	(1)
2022	Qala Diza	9	(2)
2022	Biss Buru	10	(8)
2023	Stallion Laguna	9	(3)
2023	Persipa Pati	2	(0)
2024	Aizawl	5	(0)
2024	Attack Energy SC		
2024–2025	Mendiola F.C. 1991	9	(2)
2025–	Samail	0	(0)
2025–2026	Stallion Laguna F.C.	7	(3)
- * Club domestic league appearances and goals

Amir Memari (Persian: امیر معماری; born 9 April 1993) is an Iranian professional footballer who plays as a forward for Omani club Samail.
