= Carlo Polli =

Swiss footballer (born 1989)

Personal information
- Full name: Carlo Roberto Polli
- Date of birth: 7 February 1989 (age 37)
- Place of birth: Lugano, Switzerland
- Height: 1.75 m (5 ft 9 in)
- Position: Midfielder

Team information
- Current team: Mendrisio-Stabio

Youth career
- 2001–2006: Team Ticino U-18

Senior career*
Years	Team	Apps	(Gls)
2006–2008	Lugano	8	(0)
2008–2011	Genoa	0	(0)
2010	→ FC Locarno (loan)	10	(1)
2010–2011	→ FC Chiasso (loan)	23	(1)
2011–2012	Ħamrun Spartans	15	(2)
2012–2016	FC Locarno	?	(?)
2016–2017	Stallion	18	(1)
2017	AC Bellinzona	0	(0)
2017–2018	Stallion–Laguna	36	(11)
2019–	Mendrisio-Stabio	?	(?)
- * Club domestic league appearances and goals as of 14 February 2017

Carlo Roberto Polli (born 7 February 1989) is a Swiss footballer who plays for Mendrisio-Stabio.

== Club career ==
Polli began his career with Team Ticino U-18, the youth team of AC Lugano. In mid-2006 he was promoted to the first team. He made his professional debut for Lugano before leaving for abroad. On 1 September 2008 Polli was signed by Genoa for their youth team, which plays in Campionato Nazionale Primavera. In the same season he won Coppa Italia Primavera against AS Roma and Supercoppa Primavera against Palermo. On 5 February 2010 Genoa loaned him to Swiss club FC Locarno until the end of the 2010 season. In the 2010–11 season Polli was loaned to FC Chiasso and in July 2011, he signed with Maltese club Ħamrun Spartans.

On 1 May 2016, he made his debut for Stallion in a 4-2 defeat against 2016 UFL Cup Champions, Global.

Polli signed with Mendrisio-Stabio on 2 January 2019.
