= Jesus Salazar =

American soccer player (born 2001)

Jesús Salazar
Personal information
- Full name: Jesús Francisco Salazar
- Date of birth: July 28, 2001 (age 25)
- Place of birth: San Diego, California
- Position: Midfielder

Team information
- Current team: Kasuka
- Number: 22

Youth career
- 2018–2020: D.C. United

College career
Years	Team	Apps	(Gls)
2020–2023	Mount St. Mary's Mountaineers		
2023–2024	Portland Pilots		

Senior career*
Years	Team	Apps	(Gls)
2024	Stallion Laguna	9	(0)
2024–2026	HKFC	31	(3)
2026–	Kasuka	0	(0)
- * Club domestic league appearances and goals

Jesús Francisco Salazar (born July 28, 2001) is an American professional soccer player who plays as a midfielder for Brunei Super League team Kasuka.

== Youth and college career ==
Salazar began his career at the D.C. United academy and later became the captain of the under-23 team, scoring 14 goals and 17 assists over the three-year period. During his time at the club, he was invited to train with the first team.

Salazar enrolled in Mount St. Mary's University in Maryland and played for its soccer team. On 26 August 2021, in his sophomore year, he scored the game-winning goal against Saint Peter's University. He started 14 times in the 2021–22 season.

In his junior year, he made the All-MAAC selection, starting in 17 games, scoring 5 goals and notching 8 assists.

In the 2023–24 season, in his senior year, Salazar transferred to the University of Portland, making five appearances for its soccer team.

== Club career ==
=== Stallion Laguna ===
In 2024, he joined the Philippine club Stallion Laguna, signing his first professional contract in Asia. Salazar made nine appearances for Stallion Laguna.

=== HKFC ===
He joined Hong Kong Premier League club HKFC for the 2024–2025 season and made his league debut as a substitute in a match against Kowloon City on September 29, 2024.

On November 10, 2024, he started in a match against Southern and scored his first Hong Kong Premier League goal. 43 days later, he scored the sole goal in a 1–0 win against Southern again.

=== Kasuka ===
On 25 August 2026, Bruneian club Kasuka FC announced the signing of Salazar. He made his competitive debut in the 2026–27 ASEAN Club Championship qualifying play-off round first leg against Manila Digger in a 5–1 defeat.
