= Magson Dourado =

Brazilian footballer

Personal information
- Full name: Jose Magson Bezerra Dourado
- Date of birth: March 22, 1992 (age 34)
- Place of birth: Belém, Brazil
- Height: 1.74 m (5 ft 9 in)
- Position: Winger

Team information
- Current team: Stallion Laguna
- Number: 88

Youth career
- –2012: Goiás Esporte Clube
- 2013: Bahia

Senior career*
Years	Team	Apps	(Gls)
2014–2015	Águia de Marabá	16	(0)
2015–2016	Castanhal	7	(3)
2017	Independente-AP	6	(0)
2017–2018	Carajás	1	(0)
2018	Atlético Roraima	8	(6)
2018	Baré	5	(0)
2018–2019	Gavião Kyikatejê	2	(0)
2019–2020	National Police Commissary		
2020	Kirivong Sok Sen Chey	12	(5)
2020–2021	Tiffy Army		
2021	Asia Euro United	6	(0)
2021–2022	Prey Veng	4	(2)
2022–2023	Phitsanulok Unity	3	(1)
2023–2024	Khon Kaen		
2024–2025	Stallion Laguna	19	(11)
2025	Cebu	10	(0)
2025–	Stallion Laguna	8	(0)
- * Club domestic league appearances and goals as of 11:16, March 11, 2026 (UTC)

Jose Magson Bezerra Dourado (born 22 March 1992), also known as Magson Dourado or simply Magson, is a Brazilian professional footballer who plays as a winger for Stallion Laguna of the Philippines Football League. He has also played for a number of clubs in Cambodia and Thailand.

== Youth career and controversy ==
Dourado was born in Belém in Northern Brazil. He played youth football first for the youth team for Goiás, where he was a standout in the youth ranks, and was remarked to be more muscular and powerful than his teammates. A year later, after he moved to the youth team of Bahia, it was reported that Dourado had faked his age to be included in the lower age groups. Documents obtained showed that his real birth year was 1992 and not 1996, meaning that Dourado had been participating in the U17 tournaments while being in his early 20s.

== Club career ==
=== Career in Brazil ===
After leaving the youth team of Bahia, he started his first contract at Águia de Marabá, where he stayed for two seasons. For the next 5 years he would play for various clubs in Brazil's lower leagues, transferring to Castanhal in 2015, Independente-AP in 2017, and Carajás that same year. In 2018 he played for three different clubs, most notably at Baré EC, where his team made it to the final of the Campeonato Roraimense but lost on penalties.

=== Cambodia ===
After next playing for Gavião Kyikatejê in Brazil, he departed to seek a contract abroad, where he signed with Cambodian club National Police Commissary of the league then-known as the C-League. Although the next season would be delayed by the COVID-19 pandemic, he would sign with Kirivong Sok Sen Chey, another Cambodian club. He would leave the club mid-season to sign with another Cambodian side, Tiffy Army.

The next season would see him sign for Asia Euro United, where he stayed for the first half of the league. After yet another half season, he would transfer to Prey Veng. He departed the club - and Cambodia - after the season's end to seek opportunities elsewhere.

=== Thailand ===
Dourado would transfer to Thailand later that year, playing for Thai club Watbot City. During his time there, the club renamed itself to Phitsalunok Unity, and he departed the club in late 2023. He would make another stop in Thailand, playing for Khon Kaen FC in the same league before leaving the year after.

=== Stallion Laguna ===
In 2024, Dourado moved to the Philippines to play for Stallion Laguna as one of their foreign reinforcements for the 2024 Philippines Football League. He scored a goal on his debut, a 7–0 win over DB Garelli United. He would go on to have a very successful season at the club, scoring 10 goals and 6 assists in 13 matches as Stallion finished third place. His highlight at the club that season was a hat-trick in Stallion's biggest-ever win, a 13–0 victory over Manila Montet.
