= UAAP Season 77 football tournaments =

Philippine college football tournament

UAAP Season 77 Football
- Host school: University of the East
Men's Finals	G1	Wins
De La Salle Green Archers	2	0
FEU Tamaraws	3	1
- Duration: March 8, 2015
- Arena(s): Rizal Memorial Stadium
- Semifinalists: UP Fighting Maroons; Ateneo Blue Eagles
- TV network(s): ABS-CBN Sports+Action
Women's Finals	G1	Wins
UP Lady Maroons	1	0
FEU Lady Tamaraws	2	1
- Duration: March 8, 2015
- Arena(s): Rizal Memorial Stadium
- TV network(s): ABS-CBN Sports+Action
Juniors' Finals	G1	Wins
FEU–D Baby Tamaraws	2	1
Ateneo Blue Eaglets	1	0
- Duration: March 7, 2015
- Arena(s): FEU Diliman Football Field

The UAAP Season 77 men's seniors division football tournament started on November 29, 2014, at the Moro Lorenzo Football Field at the Ateneo de Manila University in Quezon City, Metro Manila. Opening-day games were the men's teams of UP vs DLSU at 2 PM and Ateneo vs UE at 4 PM. The tournament venue will also be played at the FEU-Diliman Football Field also in Quezon City, Metro Manila.

Women's seniors division tournament started on the other hand started on November 30, 2014, with Ateneo vs UP at 2PM and DLSU vs UST at 4PM. On the other hand, the Boys' juniors division will start on January 24, 2015, at the FEU-Diliman Football Field.

All divisions will have a double round robin elimination. In the Men's division top 4 teams will move on to the semifinals with both the semifinals and the finals in a Single knockout game.

Adamson University Falcons will be making its comeback in the Men's Seniors Division after more than a decade of absence. This marks the first year that all 8 member universities will compete in the Men's Seniors Football Division.

== Men's tournament ==
=== Elimination round ===
==== Team standings ====
Pos	Team	Pld	W	D	L	GF	GA	GD	Pts	Qualification
1	De La Salle Green Archers	14	9	5	0	24	9	+15	32	Semifinals
2	FEU Tamaraws	14	9	3	2	52	17	+35	30	Semifinals
3	UP Fighting Maroons	14	8	4	2	32	13	+19	28	Semifinals
4	Ateneo Blue Eagles	14	7	4	3	21	18	+3	25	Semifinals
5	NU Bulldogs	14	7	2	5	21	17	+4	23	
6	UST Growling Tigers	14	4	0	10	23	34	−11	12	
7	UE Red Warriors	14	1	2	11	8	38	−30	5	
8	Adamson Soaring Falcons	14	0	2	12	12	47	−35	2	

Source: ABS-CBN Sports

==== Match-up results ====
	Round 1							Round 2						
Team ╲ Game	1	2	3	4	5	6	7	8	9	10	11	12	13	14
AdU	NU school colors	La Salle school colors	UE school colors	UST school colors	UP school colors	FEU school colors	Ateneo school colors	UST school colors	FEU school colors	NU school colors	Ateneo school colors	La Salle school colors	UE school colors	UP school colors
AdMU	UE school colors	NU school colors	UST school colors	UP school colors	La Salle school colors	FEU school colors	Adamson school colors	UP school colors	UE school colors	La Salle school colors	Adamson school colors	FEU school colors	NU school colors	UST school colors
DLSU	UP school colors	Adamson school colors	FEU school colors	UE school colors	Ateneo school colors	NU school colors	UST school colors	FEU school colors	UST school colors	Ateneo school colors	UE school colors	Adamson school colors	UP school colors	NU school colors
FEU	UST school colors	UE school colors	La Salle school colors	NU school colors	Adamson school colors	Ateneo school colors	UP school colors	La Salle school colors	Adamson school colors	UP school colors	NU school colors	Ateneo school colors	UST school colors	UE school colors
NU	Adamson school colors	Ateneo school colors	UP school colors	FEU school colors	UST school colors	La Salle school colors	UE school colors	UE school colors	UP school colors	Adamson school colors	FEU school colors	UST school colors	Ateneo school colors	La Salle school colors
UE	Ateneo school colors	FEU school colors	Adamson school colors	La Salle school colors	UST school colors	UP school colors	NU school colors	NU school colors	Ateneo school colors	UST school colors	La Salle school colors	UP school colors	Adamson school colors	FEU school colors
UP	La Salle school colors	UST school colors	NU school colors	Ateneo school colors	Adamson school colors	UE school colors	FEU school colors	Ateneo school colors	NU school colors	FEU school colors	UST school colors	UE school colors	La Salle school colors	Adamson school colors
UST	FEU school colors	UP school colors	Ateneo school colors	Adamson school colors	UE school colors	NU school colors	La Salle school colors	Adamson school colors	La Salle school colors	UE school colors	UP school colors	NU school colors	FEU school colors	Ateneo school colors

= Win; = Draw; = Loss

==== Scores ====
Results to the right and top of the gray cells are first round games, those to the left and below are second round games.

Team	AdU	ADMU	DLSU	FEU	NU	UE	UP	UST
Adamson		1–3	2–3	1–9	0–1	1–3	0–6	1–2
Ateneo	2–1		0–0	0–2	2–2	4–1	1–0	3–2
La Salle	2–0	1–1		1–1	2–1	5–1	1–1	2–1
FEU	6–0	4–0	1–1		1–3	1–0	1–3	7–4
NU	3–1	1–0	0–1	1–5		3–0	0–1	3–1
UE	2–2	0–1	0–1	0–5	1–1		0–6	0–3
UP	1–1	2–2	0–3	3–3	1–0	2–0		2–0
UST	4–1	1–2	0–1	0–6	1–2	3–0	1–4	

Legend: Blue = left column team win; Yellow = draw; Red = top row team win.

=== Bracket ===
Semifinals
1	La Salle	1
4	Ateneo	0
2	FEU (a.e.t.)	1
3	UP	0

Final
1	La Salle	2
2	FEU (a.e.t.)	3

=== Semifinals ===
March 1, 2015
2:00 p.m.

De La Salle Green Archers	1–0	Ateneo Blue Eagles
Gelo Diamante 87'

Rizal Memorial Stadium, Manila
March 1, 2015
4:00 p.m.

FEU Tamaraws	1–0 (a.e.t.)	UP Fighting Maroons
Arnel Amita 99'

Rizal Memorial Stadium, Manila

=== Final ===
March 8, 2015

De La Salle Green Archers	2–3 (a.e.t.)	FEU Tamaraws
Gio Diamante 59'; Sabin Bustamante 81'; Koizumi (yellow card); Bustamante (yellow card); Alquiros (yellow card)		Eric Giganto 72'; Jess Melliza 83'; Paolo Bugas 94'; (yellow card) Chavez; (yellow card) Menzi, A. (yellow card) Ferrer

Rizal Memorial Stadium, Manila

=== Statistics ===
==== Goal scorers ====
16 goals

- Eric Giganto (FEU)

15 goals

- Gerardo Valmayor (UP)

12 goals

- Arnel Amita (FEU)

11 goals

- Steven Anotado (UST)
- Jesus Melliza (FEU)

9 goals

- Paolo Salenga (NU)

5 goals

- Charleston Franklin Uy (La Salle)
- Bless Brian Jumo II (Adamson)

4 goals

- David Angelo Diamante (La Salle)
- Julian Vincent Roxas (Ateneo)
- Nicolas Ferrer Jr. (FEU)
- Emilio Acosta (Ateneo)
- Gerald Mark Layumas (La Salle)
- Jean Mari Clarino (UST)
- Patrick Valenzuela (NU)
- Bless Brian Jumo I (Adamson)

3 goals

- Leo Carlo Liay (Ateneo)
- Efren Menares Jr. (UST)
- Gabriel Daniel Alcantara (UST)
- Lawrence Colina (NU)
- Carlos Alberto Gerardo Monfort (UP)
- Michael Menzi (FEU)
- Vincent Karl Aguilar (UP)
- Regil Kent Galaura (UE)
- Nathanael Andrew Alquiros (La Salle)
- Michael Jeremy Mabanag (Ateneo)

2 goals

- Khyndale Britz Manzo (UE)
- Joseph Ryan Fermin (UP)
- Michael Nehemiah Simms (UP)
- Paolo Bugas (FEU)
- Cristian Zubiri (La Salle)
- Audie Menzi (FEU)

1 goal

- Jeremiah Raphael Rocha (Ateneo)
- Jin Daniel Montemayor (Ateneo)
- Gerard Paul Etis (Adamson)
- Jusuel Pilarca (Adamson)
- Joe Niño Ariel Mallen (UE)
- John Richard Mayor (UE)
- Jose Luis Ricardo Montelibano (La Salle)
- Kim Dustin Medina (UE)
- Derrico Gabriel Diamante (La Salle)
- Jacob Ochoa (UP)
- Daniel Gadia (UP)
- Rogie Maglinas (UP)
- Julian Mariano Clarino (UP)
- Goldwyn Espina (Adamson)
- Francis Jay Abalunan (NU)
- Jezer Jalandoni (NU)
- Dexter John Benecio (UST)
- Eddie Alivio (NU)
- Paolo Gabriel Alilam (Ateneo)
- Jerico Dagsa (NU)
- Wilson Keith Marcelino (Ateneo)
- Albert Eli Yatco (UP)
- Angelou Val Jurao (FEU)
- Marc Gyman Rivera (UST)
- Yoshiharu Koizumi (La Salle)
- John Nico Macapal (NU)
- Fe Baya (UP)
- Noli John Chavez (FEU)
- Renko Feliz Gaudiel (Ateneo)
- Gregory Norman Yang (La Salle)
- Sabin Antonio Bustamante (La Salle)
- Kendall Colet (Ateneo)

own goal

- Lord Irvin Jimena (UST)
- Jin Daniel Montemayor (Ateneo)

==== Scoring ====
As of February 15, 2014

===== Overall =====
- Total number of goals scored: 190
- Average goals per match: 3.39
- Total number of braces: 14
  - Jean Mari Clarino, Gerald Mark Layumas, Arnel Amita^{3}, Gerardo Valmayor^{3}, David Angelo Diamante, Paolo Salenga, Carlos Alberto Gerardo Monfort, Jesus Melliza^{2}, Efren Menares Jr., Steven Anotado, Lawrence Colina, Regil Kent Galaura
- Most number of Braces: 3
  - Gerardo Valmayor, Arnel Amita
- Total number of hat-tricks: 7
  - Eric Giganto, Steven Anotado, Eric Giganto^{42}, Gerardo Valmayor, Arnel Amita
- Most number of hat-tricks: 3
  - Eric Giganto
- Own goals scored: 2
  - Lord Irvin Jimena, Jin Daniel Montemayor

===== Timing =====
- First goal of the tournament: Gerardo Valmayor for UP Fighting Maroons against De La Salle Green Archers
- First brace of the tournament: Jean Mari Clarino for UST Growling Tigers against FEU Tamaraws
- First hat-trick of the tournament: Eric Ben Giganto for FEU Tamaraws against UST Growling Tigers
- Fastest goal in a match from kickoff: 2nd minute
  - Gerald Mark Layumas for De La Salle Green Archers against Adamson Falcons
- Fastest brace of the tournament: 9th minute
  - Jesus Joaquin Melliza for FEU Tamaraws against UE Red Warriors
- Fastest hat-trick of the tournament: 47th minute
  - Steven Anotado for UST Growling Tigers against UE Red Warriors

===== Teams =====
- Most goals scored by a team: 52
  - FEU Tamaraws
- Fewest goals scored by a team: 8
  - UE Red Warriors
- Most goals conceded by a team: 47
  - Adamson Falcons
- Fewest goals conceded by a team: 9
  - De La Salle Green Archers
- Best goal difference: +35
  - FEU Tamaraws
- Worst goal difference: -35
  - Adamson Falcons
- Most goals scored in a match by both teams: 11
  - FEU Tamaraws 7-4 UST Growling Tigers
- Most goals scored in a match by one team: 9
  - FEU Tamaraws
- Most goals scored in a match by the losing team: 4
  - UST Growling Tigers
- Biggest margin of victory: 8 goals
  - FEU Tamaraws
- Most clean sheets achieved by a team: 6
  - UP Fighting Maroons, De La Salle Green Archers
- Fewest clean sheets achieved by a team: 0
  - Adamson Falcons
- Most consecutive clean sheets achieved by a team: 3
  - FEU Tamaraws
- Longest winning run: 4
  - De La Salle Green Archers, FEU Tamaraws
- Longest unbeaten run: 14
  - De La Salle Green Archers
- Longest winless run: 12
  - Adamson Falcons

=== Awards ===
UAAP Season 77 men's football champions
FEU Tamaraws
Tenth title, second consecutive title

- Most Valuable Player: Jess Melliza (Far Eastern University)
- Rookie of the Year: Julian Roxas (Ateneo de Manila University)
- Best Striker: Jinggoy Valmayor (University of the Philippines)
- Best Defender: Julian Clariño (University of the Philippines)
- Best Midfielder: Nathan Alquiros (De La Salle University)
- Best Goalkeeper: Raphael De Guzman (De La Salle University)
- Fair Play Award: Adamson University

== Women's tournament ==
=== Elimination round ===
==== Team standings ====
Pos	Team	Pld	W	D	L	GF	GA	GD	Pts	Qualification
1	UP Lady Maroons	8	5	1	2	12	6	+6	16	Finals
2	FEU Lady Tamaraws	8	5	1	2	11	8	+3	16	Finals
3	Ateneo Lady Eagles	8	3	2	3	8	6	+2	11	
4	De La Salle Lady Archers	8	2	2	4	5	8	−3	8	
5	UST Growling Tigresses	8	2	0	6	4	12	−8	6	

Source: ABS-CBN Sports

==== Match-up results ====
	Round 1				Round 2			
Team ╲ Game	1	2	3	4	5	6	7	8
AdMU	UP school colors	UST school colors	La Salle school colors	FEU school colors	La Salle school colors	UP school colors	FEU school colors	UST school colors
DLSU	UST school colors	Ateneo school colors	FEU school colors	UP school colors	Ateneo school colors	FEU school colors	UST school colors	UP school colors
FEU	UP school colors	UST school colors	La Salle school colors	Ateneo school colors	UST school colors	La Salle school colors	UP school colors	Ateneo school colors
UP	Ateneo school colors	FEU school colors	UST school colors	La Salle school colors	Ateneo school colors	FEU school colors	UST school colors	La Salle school colors
UST	La Salle school colors	Ateneo school colors	FEU school colors	UP school colors	FEU school colors	La Salle school colors	UP school colors	Ateneo school colors

= Win; = Draw; = Loss

==== Scores ====
Results to the right and top of the gray cells are first round games, those to the left and below are second round games.

Team	ADMU	DLSU	FEU	UP	UST
Ateneo		2–0	1–2	0–1	0–1
La Salle	0–0		1–2	2–0	1–0
FEU	1–3	1–1		0–1	2–1
UP	1–1	2–0	0–2		4–0
UST	0–1	1–0	0–1	1–3	

Legend: Blue = left column team win; Yellow = draw; Red = top row team win.

=== Final ===
March 8, 2015

UP Lady Maroons	1–2	FEU Lady Tamaraws
Marie Navea-Huff 90+1' (pen.)		Alesa Dolina 22'; Ina Araneta 67'

Rizal Memorial Stadium, Manila

=== Statistics ===
==== Goal Scorers ====
3 goals

- Cristina Delos Reyes (UP)

2 goals

- Chelo Marie Hodges (La Salle)
- Alina Rose Araneta (FEU)
- Charmaine Joy Fagaragan (FEU)
- Sharmine Siaotong (FEU)

1 goal

- Christille Mae Ardiente (UP)
- Irish Navaja (La Salle)
- Marie Navea-Huff (UP)
- Daryl Ann Mendoza (UST)
- Anne Therese Marie Martin (Ateneo)
- Kathleen Camille Rodriguez (Ateneo)
- Rocelle Marie Lecera (FEU)
- Marie Rose Obra (UP)
- Marie Angelie Cadayona (Ateneo)
- Adesa Dolino (FEU)
- Barbie Ann Sobredo (FEU)
- Chermaine Lou Guancia (La Salle)
- Antonette Amoncio (Ateneo)
- Kali Alexandra Navea-Huff (UP)
- Pearl Anjanette Aguilar (UST)

Own goal

- Kimberlee Jimenez (Ateneo)

=== Awards ===
UAAP Season 77 women's football champions
FEU Lady Tamaraws
Tenth title, third consecutive title

- Most Valuable Player: Alesa Dolino (Far Eastern University)
- Rookie of the Year: Chelo Hodges (De La Salle University)
- Best Striker:
  - Kathleen Camille Rodriguez (Ateneo de Manila University)
  - Cristina Delos Reyes (University of the Philippines)
  - Rose Obra (University of the Philippines)
  - Alesa Dolino (Far Eastern University)
- Best Midfielder: Cristina Delos Reyes (University of the Philippines)
- Best Defender: Alesa Dolino (Far Eastern University)
- Best Goalkeeper: Inna Palacios (De La Salle University)
- Fair Play Award: De La Salle University

== Juniors' tournament ==
=== Elimination round ===
==== Team standings ====
Pos	Team	Pld	W	D	L	GF	GA	GD	Pts	Qualification
1	FEU–D Baby Tamaraws	6	6	0	0	32	2	+30	18	Finals
2	Ateneo Blue Eaglets	6	3	1	2	12	13	−1	10	Finals
3	Zobel Junior Archers	6	1	1	4	6	19	−13	4	
4	UST Tiger Cubs	6	0	2	4	5	19	−14	2	

Source: ABS-CBN Sports

==== Match-up results ====
	Round 1			Round 2		
Team ╲ Game	1	2	3	4	5	6
AdMU	La Salle school colors	UST school colors	FEU school colors	UST school colors	La Salle school colors	FEU school colors
DLSZ	Ateneo school colors	FEU school colors	UST school colors	FEU school colors	Ateneo school colors	UST school colors
FEU	UST school colors	La Salle school colors	Ateneo school colors	La Salle school colors	UST school colors	Ateneo school colors
UST	FEU school colors	Ateneo school colors	La Salle school colors	Ateneo school colors	FEU school colors	La Salle school colors

= Win; = Draw; = Loss

==== Scores ====
Results to the right and top of the gray cells are first round games, those to the left and below are second round games.

Team	ADMU	DLSZ	FEU	UST
Ateneo		2–1	1–3	2–2
La Salle	0–4		0–8	2–2
FEU	6–1	2–0		10–0
UST	1–2	1–3	0–3	

Legend: Blue = left column team win; Yellow = draw; Red = top row team win.

=== Finals ===
March 7, 2015

FEU–D Baby Tamaraws	2–1	Ateneo Blue Eaglets

FEU Diliman Football Field

=== Awards ===
UAAP Season 77 juniors' football champions
FEU–D Baby Tamaraws
Fifth title, fifth consecutive title

== Overall championship points ==
=== Seniors' division ===
Team	Men	Women	Total
FEU Tamaraws	15	15	30
UP Fighting Maroons	10	12	22
De La Salle Green Archers	12	8	20
Ateneo Blue Eagles	8	10	18
UST Growling Tigers	4	6	10
NU Bulldogs	6	—	6
UE Red Warriors	2	—	2
Adamson Soaring Falcons	1	—	1

=== Juniors' division ===
Team	Points
FEU–D Baby Tamaraws	15
Ateneo Blue Eaglets	12
Zobel Junior Archers	10
UST Tiger Cubs	8

Pts.	Ranking
15	Champion
12	2nd
10	3rd
8	4th
6	5th
4	6th
2	7th
1	8th
—	Did not join

In case of a tie, the team with the higher position in any tournament is ranked higher. If both are still tied, they are listed by alphabetical order.

How rankings are determined:

- Ranks 5th to 8th determined by elimination round standings.
- Loser of the #1 vs #4 semifinal match-up is ranked 4th
- Loser of the #2 vs #3 semifinal match-up is ranked 3rd
- Loser of the finals is ranked 2nd
- Champion is ranked 1st

== See also ==
- UAAP Season 77
