= Ken Pryde =

Filipino footballer

Personal information
- Full name: Kenneth James Baylosis Pryde
- Date of birth: March 19, 2001 (age 25)
- Place of birth: Fareham, England
- Position: Defender

Team information
- Current team: Stallion Laguna
- Number: 26

Youth career
- –2017: Brookfield Community School
- 2017–2019: Barton Peveril Sixth Form College

College career
Years	Team	Apps	(Gls)
2019–2022	College of St. Scholastica	69	(12)

Senior career*
Years	Team	Apps	(Gls)
2023	Duluth		
2023—	Stallion Laguna	6	(2)
- * Club domestic league appearances and goals as of 14:43, September 23, 2023 (UTC)

Kenneth James Baylosis Pryde (born 19 March 2001) is a Filipino professional footballer. Born in England, he plays for PFL club Stallion Laguna.

== Personal life ==
Pryde was born in Fareham, England. He studied at Brookfield Community School before moving to Barton Peveril Sixth Form College.

== College career ==
Pryde moved to the United States in 2019 to pursue a college education at the College of St. Scholastica. In his four years with the Saints, he made 69 appearances and scored 12 goals, earning all-conference honors multiple times.

== Club career ==
=== Duluth FC ===
In early 2023, after graduating from St. Scholastica, Pryde played amateur football for local club Duluth FC, who were currently competing in the NPSL Midwest Region's North Conference. In August 2023, his departure from the club was announced.

=== Stallion Laguna ===
He signed his first professional contract with a club in the Philippines, his country of heritage. He joined Stallion Laguna, who were competing in the AFC Cup for the first time, making his debut in a 6–1 win over Philippine Army off the bench.

== International career ==
=== Philippines U23 ===
While still playing for Duluth, Pryde was contacted by the Philippine Football Federation on the possibility for playing for the Philippines U23 team for the 2023 edition of the Southeast Asian Games. He was on the preliminary roster, but did not secure a final spot.
