= Jesus Melliza =

Filipino footballer

Personal information
- Full name: Jesus Joaquin Gaquit Melliza
- Date of birth: April 20, 1992 (age 34)
- Place of birth: La Paz, Iloilo City, Philippines
- Height: 1.57 m (5 ft 2 in)
- Positions: Attacking midfielder; winger

Team information
- Current team: Kaya–Iloilo
- Number: 13

College career
Years	Team	Apps	(Gls)
–2015	Far Eastern University		

Senior career*
Years	Team	Apps	(Gls)
2015–2017	Green Archers United		
2017–2021	Stallion Laguna	61	(33)
2021–	Kaya–Iloilo	26	(7)

International career^{‡}
2022–	Philippines	8	(1)
- * Club domestic league appearances and goals as of 23 May 2023 ‡ National team caps and goals as of 06:35; 2 January 2023

Jesus Joaquin Gaquit Melliza (born April 20, 1992), nicknamed Jhan or Jess Melliza, is a Filipino professional footballer who plays as an attacking midfielder or a winger for Philippines Football League (PFL) club Kaya–Iloilo and the Philippines national team.

== Early life ==
A native of La Paz, Iloilo City, Melliza was born on April 20, 1992.

== Collegiate career ==
Melliza played for the Far Eastern University in the football tournament of the University Athletic Association of the Philippines (UAAP). He ended his college stint with FEU in 2015 by helping his varsity team win the UAAP Season 77 football title.

=== Green Archers United ===
Melliza was already suiting up for Green Archers United of the United Football League while he was still playing college football for FEU.

=== Stallion Laguna ===
He was later signed in by Stallion Laguna by May 2017 to play at the Philippines Football League (PFL). He was the top Filipino scorer in the PFL inaugural season.

=== Kaya-Iloilo ===
Melliza and Stallion teammate Fitch Arboleda joined Kaya–Iloilo in March 2021.

== International career ==
=== Philippines U23 ===
He was to play for the under-23 team of the Philippines at the 2015 Southeast Asian Games in Singapore but he was cut out from the final squad due to paperwork issues.

=== Philippines ===
Melliza earned his first call up for the Philippines senior national team in October 2017 for the 2019 AFC Asian Cup third round qualifier match against Yemen, however, he had yet to earn an international cap for the team. In June 2022, he made his debut for the Philippines in a 1–0 win against Mongolia in the third round of the 2023 AFC Asian Cup qualifiers.

== Career statistics ==
=== Club ===
As of 23 May 2023.

Club	Season	League			Cup		Continental		Total	
Club	Season	Division	Apps	Goals	Apps	Goals	Apps	Goals	Apps	Goals
Stallion Laguna	2017	PFL	19	13	–		–		19	13
Stallion Laguna	2018	PFL	19	8	4	2	–		23	10
Stallion Laguna	2019	PFL	19	11	1	1	–		20	12
Stallion Laguna	2020	PFL	4	1	–		–		4	1
Kaya–Iloilo	2021	PFL	–		3	0	3	0	6	0
Kaya–Iloilo	2022–23	PFL	23	6	8	3	4	0	35	9
Career total			84	39	16	6	7	0	107	45

=== International goals ===
Scores and results list the Philippines' goal tally first.

#	Date	Venue	Opponent	Score	Result	Competition
2022
1.	December 23, 2022	Rizal Memorial Stadium, Manila, Philippines	Brunei	3–0	5–1	2022 AFF Championship

== Honors ==
Kaya–Iloilo

- Philippines Football League: 2022–23
