= Juan Trujillo =

Mexican football player

Personal information
- Full name: Juan Diego Galeana Trujillo
- Date of birth: 5 October 1999 (age 27)
- Place of birth: Mexico City, Mexico
- Positions: Midfielder; winger

Team information
- Current team: Stallion Laguna
- Number: 11

Senior career*
Years	Team	Apps	(Gls)
2017–2020	Cocodrilos	64	(17)
2021–	Stallion Laguna	24	(13)
- * Club domestic league appearances and goals as of 7:47, 25 June 2024 (UTC)

Juan Diego Galeana Trujillo is a Mexican professional footballer who plays as a midfielder or a winger for Stallion Laguna of the Philippines Football League.

== Personal life ==
Trujillo was born in Mexico City, and grew up in Lázaro Cárdenas in the state of Michoacán.

== Club career ==
=== Cocodrilos ===
Trujillo, known as Juan Galeana in Mexico, first played for his hometown club Cocodrilos Lázaro Cárdenas in the Liga TDP, then the third tier of Mexican football. He played for the club for three seasons before taking a hiatus in 2020. In 2021, the club dissolved due to financial difficulties posed due to the passing of the club's owner.

=== Stallion Laguna ===
In 2022, he signed a contract with another professional club, signing for Philippine club Stallion Laguna of the Philippines Football League. He made his first appearance in the third-place playoff of the 2021 Copa Paulino Alcantara. His re-signing with Stallion was confirmed on April 11, 2022, where he would prove vital for his team as they finished third, contributing 2 goals and 5 assists.

In 2023, Stallion participated in the AFC Cup for the very first time, with Trujillo notching two assists in the club's opening 5–2 loss to Bali United.
