= Charlie Beaton =

Filipino footballer

Personal information
- Full name: Charlie Yancy Larumbe Beaton
- Date of birth: April 12, 1995 (age 31)
- Place of birth: Cavite, Philippines
- Height: 1.63 m (5 ft 4 in)
- Position: Central midfielder

Team information
- Current team: Maharlika
- Number: 12

Youth career
- Watford U18

Senior career*
Years	Team	Apps	(Gls)
2015–2016	Loyola Meralco Sparks		
2016–2017	Kaya		
2017–2018	Ilocos United	13	(3)
2018	JPV Marikina	0	(0)
2018–2020	Global Cebu	5	(1)
2020–2022	Maharlika Manila	5	(0)
2022–2023	Dynamic Herb Cebu	1	(0)
2023	Maharlika Manila	7	(0)
2023–2024	Stallion Laguna	8	(0)
2024	Loyola	14	(1)
2024–2026	Stallion Laguna	7	(0)
2026–	Maharlika	5	(1)

International career
2016	Philippines U23	1	(0)
- * Club domestic league appearances and goals as of 11 March 2026

Charlie Yancy Larumbe Beaton (born 12 April 1995) is a Filipino professional footballer who plays as a midfielder for Philippines Football League club Maharlika F.C.. He is a former Philippines national under-23 football team player.

== Club career ==
=== Kaya FC ===
He joined Kaya FC for 2016 United Football League the seventh and last season of the league and the 2016 AFC Cup.

=== Ilocos United ===
In 2017, Beaton joined the Ilocos United FC after playing for Kaya FC for almost a year.

=== Maharlika Manila ===
Maharlika Manila signed Beaton from the suspended Global FC.

=== Maharlika Manila ===
In 2023, Beaton return to Maharlika Manila FC.

=== Stallion Laguna ===
Beaton joined Stallion for the 2023 Copa Paulino Alcantara.

=== Loyola FC ===
In 2024, He return to his former club Loyola FC for the 2024 Philippines Football League season.

== Personal life ==
Beaton was born to an English father and a Cebuana mother.

== International career ==
=== Philippines U23 ===
In 2016, Beaton was part of the Philippines U-23 squad.

== Honours ==
=== Club ===
Global FC

- 2015 United Football League; runners up
