= Jorrel Aristorenas =

Filipino footballer (born 1994)

Personal information
- Birth name: Jorrel Zachary Cayanan Aristorenas
- Date of birth: March 1, 1994 (age 32)
- Place of birth: Camden Town, London, England
- Height: 1.70 m (5 ft 7 in)
- Position: Midfielder

Team information
- Current team: Maharlika
- Number: 10

Senior career*
Years	Team	Apps	(Gls)
2014–2017	Loyola Meralco Sparks	25	(3)
2017	Ceres–Negros	1	(0)
2017–2018	Davao Aguilas	4	(0)
2019	Global Makati	1	(0)
2020–2021	United City	4	(0)
2022–2023	Stallion Laguna	18	(0)
2024	Loyola	13	(4)
2024–	Maharlika	31	(4)

International career^{‡}
2015	Philippines U23	3	(0)
- * Club domestic league appearances and goals as of 5:51, March 11, 2026 (UTC) ‡ National team caps and goals as of 1:59, August 31, 2023 (UTC)

Jorrel Zachary Cayanan Aristorenas (born 1 March 1994) is a professional footballer who plays as a midfielder for and captains Philippines Football League club Maharlika. Born in England, he has represented the Philippines at youth level. He is also an esports player, having represented the country internationally in EA FC.

== Club career ==
=== Loyola ===
In 2014, Aristorenas signed for United Football League club Loyola Meralco Sparks alongside fellow Filipino-Englishman Charlie Beaton, quickly becoming a mainstay. At Loyola, he won the 2014–15 PFF National Men's Club Championship, the first in the club's history. He stayed with them up until the end of the UFL in late 2016.

=== Ceres–Negros ===
When the professional Philippines Football League was established he joined heavyweights Ceres–Negros, and was on the bench for the club's matches in the AFC Cup where they reached the Inter-Zonal semifinals, although he didn't make an appearance. During the mid-season transfer break, he transferred to Davao Aguilas.

=== Davao Aguilas ===
Prompted by a new sponsorship with the San Miguel Corporation, Davao Aguilas began recruiting a number of big signings, with Aristorenas arriving alongside the Younghusband brothers, James and Phil. The club reached the 2018 Copa Paulino Alcantara Final and finished 3rd in the league the following season. At the end of the 2018 season, however, Davao Aguilas withdrew from the PFL, leaving him clubless.

=== Global Makati ===
In 2019, Aristorenas joined struggling Global Makati, who were plagued by financial and management issues. At the start of the 2020 season, he resigned with the club as part of a management overhaul with Mazinyi Group taking charge, but the club never played another match. Aristorenas was among the players who brought to awareness the lack of wages being paid and the state of the club, which ultimately led to it being blacklisted.

=== United City ===
Aristorenas signed with United City in 2020, a club that had once been Ceres–Negros but had undergone a change in management. In his only season at the club, he won the 2020 Philippines Football League. He took a break from playing professional football in 2021, but remained with United City as part of their Esports team.

=== Stallion Laguna ===
In 2022, he signed with another PFL club in Stallion Laguna before the club's participation in the 2022–23 season of the PFL and made his debut in a 2–1 win against Maharlika Manila. At the end of the season, Stallion qualified for the AFC Cup for the first time.

== International career ==
=== Philippines U23 ===
Aristorenas was first called up to the Philippine U23 team in the 2016 AFC U-23 Championship qualifiers in 2015, making 3 appearances, though the Philippines lost all three matches.

=== Senior team ===
Soon after, he was called up to the senior team by coach Thomas Dooley as part of the 2018 FIFA World Cup qualifiers against Uzbekistan and North Korea. Though he was on the bench for both matches, the Azkals narrowly lost to Uzbekistan and pulled a stunning 3–2 upset over North Korea. Later, he was included in the team's preliminary squad for the 2016 AFF Championship, though he did not make the final squad.

== Esports career ==
Aristorenas also played for the esports team of United City, winning the PFF eTrophy and representing the club in the FIFAe Nations Online tournament. In 2022, he represented the Philippines in the SEA Games, but instead of football, was part of Team Sibol as the Philippines' representative in FIFA Online 4.

Aristorenas represented the country again in the same video game title (now named EA Sports FC Online) at the 2022 Asian Games in Huangzhou.

He qualified for the 2027 Red Bull Wings Cup World Finals in Miami, Florida.
