= Junior Ngong Sam =

Cameroonian footballer (born 1988)

Personal information
- Full name: Junior Stephen Ngong Sam
- Date of birth: 17 February 1998 (age 28)
- Place of birth: Bambili, Cameroon
- Position: Striker

Team information
- Current team: Terengganu
- Number: 19

Youth career
- 2012–2015: Puissance Avenir
- 2015–2017: Cosmos FA du Mbam

Senior career*
Years	Team	Apps	(Gls)
2022–2023	Mendiola FC 1991	19	(6)
2023–2024	Stallion Laguna	13	(9)
2024–2025	One Taguig	17	(7)
2025–	Terengganu FC	11	(1)
Total		60	(23)
- * Club domestic league appearances and goals as of 06:55, 15 September 2024 (UTC)

Junior Stephen Ngong Sam (born 17 February 1988), known as Junior Sam, is a Cameroonian professional footballer who plays as a striker for Malaysia Super League club Terengganu.

== Early life ==
Sam was born in Bambili, Cameroon. He spent his youth career in his home country, playing for Puissance Avenir from 2012 to 2015 and Cosmos FA du Mbam from 2015 to 2017. In 2017, he moved to the Philippines, where he initially played in amateur and semi-professional circuits. He featured for Laos FC in the former UFL and gained prominence in the 7-a-side football scene with Manhur FC, notably representing the Philippines at the Neymar Jr's Five World Finals in Brazil.

== Style of play ==
Primarily a centre-forward, Sam is known for his physicality and ability to hold up the ball under pressure. Standing at 1.80 m (5 ft 11 in), he is noted for his aerial presence, which was particularly effective during his tenure at Stallion Laguna, where he served as a target man in AFC Cup play. Since moving to the Malaysia Super League, he has demonstrated versatility by occasionally playing as a winger, utilizing his right foot to cut inside and create scoring opportunities for teammates.

== Club career ==
=== Early career ===
Sam was born in Bambili, Cameroon. He played the majority of his youth career in Cameroon, first for Puissance Avenir then transferring to Cosmos FA Du Mbam.

In 2017, he moved to the Philippines to play amateur football for Laos, a former club in the UFL, before playing 7's football for Manhur FC. During this time, he also represented his club in tournaments such as Neymar Jr's Five World Finals.

=== Mendiola FC 1991 ===
In 2022, he signed his first professional contract with Filipino side United City alongside other foreign recruitments, but did not play a match and was transferred to Mendiola 1991 before the club's cup campaign, the 2022 Copa Paulino Alcantara, kicked off. He remained with Mendiola for the 2022–23 season of the PFL and was successful, with 6 goals and 1 assist in 19 appearances, though Mendiola finished second-last.

=== Stallion Laguna ===
During the 2023 Copa Paulino Alcantara, Sam was re-signed by Mendiola and played matches for the club, though he was loaned to fellow PFL club Stallion Laguna as a foreign reinforcement for the club's matches in their maiden AFC Cup campaign. In the opening match at the Biñan Football Stadium, Stallion lost 5–2 to Indonesian side Bali United, with Sam scoring the equalizer in the 30th minute.

=== Terengganu FC ===
On 2 July 2025, Sam signed with Malaysia Super League side Terengganu FC on a free transfer, becoming the club's first foreign signing for the 2025–26 season following the departure of several key imports. Having previously scored twice against Terengganu while playing for Stallion Laguna in the AFC Cup, he was recruited to provide physical presence to the attack.

He made his league debut in August 2025 and scored his first goal for the club on 27 August 2025, in a 5–2 victory over Selangor. Throughout the first half of the season, Sam was utilized both as a central striker and a wide forward. He also played a key role in the Malaysia FA Cup, appearing in four matches and scoring a crucial goal to help Terengganu reach the quarter-finals. By early 2026, he had established himself as a regular fixture in the squad, featuring in the Piala Malaysia round of 16 against UM-Damansara.

== Career statistics ==
As of 5 March 2026

Club	Season	League			National cup (Note: Includes Copa Paulino Alcantara and Malaysia FA Cup)		League cup (Note: Includes Piala Malaysia)		Continental (Note: Includes AFC Cup)		Other		Total	
Club	Season	Division	Apps	Goals	Apps	Goals	Apps	Goals	Apps	Goals	Apps	Goals	Apps	Goals
Mendiola FC 1991	2022–23	PFL	19	6	1	1	—		—		—		20	7
Mendiola FC 1991	2023	PFL	0	0	2	2	—		—		—		2	2
Mendiola FC 1991	Total		19	6	3	3	—		—		—		22	9
Stallion Laguna	2024	PFL	13	9	0	0	—		5	3	—		18	12
One Taguig FC	2024–25	PFL	17	7	0	0	—		—		1 (Note: Appearance in PFL Final Series)	0	18	7
Terengganu FC	2025–26	Malaysia Super League	11	1	4	1	2	0	—		—		17	2
Career total			60	23	7	4	2	0	5	3	1	0	75	30

== Honours ==
Stallion Laguna

- Philippines Football League runner-up: 2024
- Copa Paulino Alcantara runner-up: 2023
