= Jayvee Kallukaran =

Filipino footballer (born 2000)

Personal information
- Full name: Jayvee Solon Kallukaran
- Date of birth: September 7, 2000 (age 26)
- Place of birth: Jeddah, Saudi Arabia
- Height: 1.75 m (5 ft 9 in)
- Position: Left-back

Team information
- Current team: Stallion Laguna

Youth career
- FCV Stamford

Senior career*
Years	Team	Apps	(Gls)
2020–2024	Stallion Laguna	13	(0)
2022	→ Azkals Development Team (loan)	4	(0)
2024	Loyola	14	(4)
2024–2025	Davao Aguilas	8	(0)
2025–2026	Stallion Laguna	2	(0)
2026–	Aguilas–UMak	3	(0)

International career^{‡}
2022	Philippines U23	4	(0)
- * Club domestic league appearances and goals as of 7:24, August 28, 2024 (UTC) ‡ National team caps and goals as of 8:20, April 4, 2024 (UTC)

Jayvee Solon Kallukaran (born 7 September 2000) is a professional footballer who plays as a left-back for PFL club Aguilas–UMak. Born in Saudi Arabia and raised in India, he represented the Philippines at youth level.

== Career ==
=== Youth career ===
Kallukaran was born to Delise Solon and Francis Kallukaran in Jeddah, Saudi Arabia, and lived in Kakkanad as a teenager. In his late teens, he played youth football for FCV Stamford in England.

=== Stallion Laguna ===
In 2020, Kallukaran moved from England to the country of his father, the Philippines, and signed for Stallion Laguna of the Philippines Football League, where he made his debut in the 2020 season. In 2022, he was loaned to the Azkals Development Team but returned to Stallion the following season, making 13 appearances. In the club's first-ever campaign in the AFC Cup, he scored a goal as Stallion lost to Bali United.

=== Loyola ===
Kallukaran would transfer from Stallion Laguna to fellow PFL side Loyola in 2024, who were making their return to the league for the first time in 7 years.

== International career ==
=== Philippines U23 ===
During the 2022 AFF U23 Championship, Kallukaran received his first-ever national team call up. He made his debut in a 2–1 win over Brunei, replacing Sandro Reyes. He was again called up for the 2021 SEA Games, playing in 3 out of 4 matches.
