= Terence Linatoc =

Filipino-Canadian soccer player (born 1994)

Personal information
- Full name: Terence Rei Linatoc
- Date of birth: 7 June 1994 (age 32)
- Place of birth: Scarborough, Ontario, Canada
- Height: 1.70 m (5 ft 7 in)
- Positions: Defender; forward

College career
Years	Team	Apps	(Gls)
2012–2013	York Lions		

Senior career*
Years	Team	Apps	(Gls)
2011	SC Toronto B		(10)
2016–2018	Stallion Laguna F.C.	24	(3)
2019	Durham United FA	8	(0)

International career
2016	Philippines U23	1	(0)
- * Club domestic league appearances and goals as of September 7, 2019

Terence Linatoc (born June 7, 1994) is a former soccer player. Born in Canada, he represented the Philippines at international level.

== Playing career ==
Linatoc began his career in 2011 in the Canadian Soccer League with SC Toronto B in the Second Division, where he recorded ten goals. In 2012, he enrolled into York University to play college soccer for two seasons. In 2016, he went overseas to play with Stallion Laguna F.C. in the newly formed Philippines Football League. He played in League1 Ontario in 2019 with Durham United FA.
