= Ernest Nierras =

Filipino football head coach

Personal information
- Full name: Ernest Thomas Nierras

Team information
- Current team: Philippines (Assistant coach)

Managerial career
- Years: Team
- 2006: MPL-FA (women's U17)
- 2011–2012: Philippines (women's)
- 2012–present: Stallion Laguna
- 2022–2023: Philippines (Team manager)
- 2023-present: Philippines (Assistant coach)

Ernest Thomas Nierras is a Filipino football coach and the current head coach of Stallion–Laguna. He also previously served as assistant coach of the Philippines national football team.

== Coaching career ==
=== Men's football ===
Nierras is the current head coach of Stallion–Laguna which plays in the Philippines Football League. Nierras also mentored the club when it was competing in the United Football League.

=== Women's football ===
==== Club ====
Nierras has coached the women's team of the Muntinlupa-Parañaque-Las Piñas F.A. (MPL-FA). The under-17 team under Nierras won the 2006 PFF National Women's U-17 Championship which was held in San Carlos, Negros Occidental in May. MPL-FA defeated Iloilo in the finals with the scoreline of 2-1 at the finals held at the San Julio Realty Football Field. MPL-FA became the first associate member of the Philippine Football Federation to win the championship.

==== International ====
Nierras, along with Cathy Rivilla, were named team managers of the Philippine women's national football team under head coach Marlon Maro in 2005. They were first task to manage the national team that will take part at the 2005 Southeast Asian Games. The involvement of Nierras' daughter, Samantha prompted him to take the job as one of the co-manager of the team.

He later became the head coach of the national team. His last stint as head coach was at the 2013 Southeast Asian Games.

Following the Southeast Asian Games campaign, allegations arose that coach Ernie Nierres used stolen credit cards in booking flight tickets of the US-based players, which prompted the concerned players to buy their own tickets due to their tickets being voided for not being authorized. Nierras denied the accusation, insisting that a travel agency was responsible for booking the tickets and not him. In 2014 the national team did not play a competitive match.

In February 2015, it was reported that PFF General Secretary Ed Gastanes said that the women's national team didn't have a head coach. Previously Ernie Nierras was not an A license coach meaning he was not able to continue his coaching stint, leading the team in his last competitive match as coach in 2013. Buda Bautista, appointed in May 2015 succeeded him as head coach.

In July 2018, Nierras temporarily left his club, Stallion Laguna to complete an AFC "A" Coaching Certificate Course.
