= Stallion Laguna F.C. =

Filipino association football club based in Biñan, Laguna

Stallion Laguna
- Full name: Stallion Laguna Football Club
- Nickname: The Stallions
- Short name: STA
- Founded: 2002; 24 years ago
- Ground: Biñan Football Stadium
- Capacity: 2,580
- Chairman: Filbert Alquiros
- Head coach: Ernest Nierras
- League: Philippines Football League
- 2025–26: Philippines Football League, 6th of 10
Home colours	Away colours

Stallion Laguna Football Club is a Filipino professional football club based in Biñan, Laguna. The club competes in the Philippines Football League, the top tier of football in the Philippines.

In 2002, the club was founded as Stallion Football Club. The club competed in the Metro Manila-based United Football League, earning promotion to Division 1 after finishing as runners-up in the 2011 season. The club proceeded to compete in the UFL Division 1 from 2012 to 2016, winning one United Football League title and one UFL Cup, both in the 2012–2013 UFL season.

Originally based in Barotac Nuevo, Iloilo, the club moved to the Biñan Football Stadium in Biñan, Laguna in 2016, after submitting its application to join the Philippines Football League. Stallion Laguna also used 4,500-capacity McKinley Hill Stadium for some home games.

== History ==
In 2001, a group of football enthusiasts from Barotac Nuevo, Iloilo thought of establishing a club that would regularly compete in football tournaments held in the town. The name of the club was conceptualized during a drinking session where most of the group were drinking Red Horse Stallion beer. The group decided to name the club Stallion Football Club after Tamasak, the town's folklore hero, a pure white stallion known for its strength.

The club made its debut in the 2001 Barotac Nuevo Football Club (BNFC) Seven-a-Side Football Tournament. They played under the name Stallion Aqua Sports at the 2002 Cocomangas Beach Football Tournament in Boracay due to sponsorship deal with Aqua Sport Shop Boracay. They returned to the BNFC as the Stallion Bulalo Soldier in 2003.

Stallion was formally established as a proper club in 2006, and continued to participate in various local competitions in the Philippines including the Siniki Football Festival and other tournaments in Cebu, Boracay, Subic, Metro Manila and Capiz.

Initially the club culture revolved around building friendship among its members and Red Horse Stallion drinking session usually held after each match of the club. However the club decided to begin catering to a wider demographic in order to develop football in their locale. Stallion organized the first edition of its own football tournament, the Stallion Football Club Seven-a-Side Football Tournament in order to promote football in Barotac Nuevo and in early 2019 set up Stallion Kids, a football development program for the youth.

It began competing in national football tournaments and leagues such as the United Football League (UFL) in 2010 and the 2011 PFF-Smart Club Championships. In the later tournament, the club lost to San Beda in the quarterfinals, 2–1.

=== 2010–11: Promotion to UFL Division 1 ===
Stallion FC finished as one of the top three teams in the UFL Division 2 during the 2011 United Football League season. This automatically earned the club a promotion to the UFL Division 1 along with Manila Nomads and Pasargad.

=== 2011–12: Debut in first division ===
At the start of the 2012 United Football League season, in the club's first match in the UFL Division 1, Stallion defeated Philippine Navy, 6–0. In their next match, the team defeated the 2011 UFL Cup and then current league champions Philippine Air Force, 4–1. In addition, the club also scored a 3–2 win against eventual 2012 season champions Global FC.

To close the season, Stallion defeated Philippine Army in their last couple of games. With these two wins, the club secured the fourth spot of the top division.

=== 2012–13: New signings and affiliate team ===
In preparation for the 2013 season, aside from sharing its coaching staff with an affiliate Sta. Lucia-owned club, Stallion signed footballers Rhante Bayquin and Won Hyung Lee to beef up their lineup for the 2012 UFL Cup. In addition, the club also got the services of Spanish midfielder Rufino Familiar Sanchez and defender Joaquin Canas Garcia from Internacional de Madrid CF, an association football club from Moraleja de Enmedio in Community of Madrid, Spain that plays in the Tercera División.

In August 2012, Stallion announced that it has signed Filipino international player and Philippines national under-23 football team captain Jason de Jong for the upcoming season. De Jong, who also represents the Philippines national football team in the international level, was initially offered to play for Stallion in March 2012, but then he was offered a trial with Ayr United. Eventually, due to financial constraints, the Scottish First Division side was forced to let De Jong go, which enabled Stallion to finally sign him to a contract.

==== UFL Cup champions ====

2012 UFL Cup final starting lineup

The club started in the group stages and topped Group D with 9 points (3 wins, 1 loss) to qualify in the knockout stage. In the quarterfinals of the cup's knockout stage, Stallion defeated General Trias FC on penalty shoot out with 5–4 result. In the semi-finals, the club edged Green Archers United with a scoreline of 3–1, booking them for the finals.

On 17 December 2012, Stallion FC defeated Global FC on the finals of the UFL Cup in the Rizal Memorial Stadium, Manila with a score of 2–1, getting the cup title and its first UFL crown. Team captain Ruben Doctora and Spanish striker Rufo Sánchez scored one goal apiece to upset previous league champions Global. Doctora won the Golden Ball award, the tournament's equivalent to the Most Valuable Player award, while Wilson Muñoz bagged the Golden Glove trophy as the best goalkeeper in the competition.

==== PFF Championship early exit ====
To prepare for the second season of the PFF National Men's Club Championship, Stallion enlisted the services of American soccer midfielder Jeremy Taylor Hohn and Goalkeeper Cyrus Andre Mohseni, who was part of the under-18 team of the U.S. Soccer Development Academy.

On 13 January 2013, Negros Occidental-based club Ceres FC pulled a stunning 1–0 upset over Stallion FC, eliminating the 2012 UFL Cup champions from the 2013 PFF National Men's Club Championship.

==== UFL Division 1 campaign ====
After a disappointing run in the 2013 PFF National Men's Club Championship, Stallion signed several foreign football players to bolster its lineup including Colombian-born American forward Diego Barrera, Argentinian midfielder Matthias Bonvehi, Japanese midfielder Yuuri Ishizuka, Brazilian-Japanese midfielder Daniel Matsunaga, and Australian defender Jesse Martindale. In addition, several players from local clubs transferred to Stallion such as Brazilian goalkeeper Guilherme Hasegawa from Team Socceroo FC and midfielder Shirmar Felongco from Ceres FC.

On 13 June 2013, Stallion clinched the Division 1 championship of the 2013 United Football League after Kaya came away with a 3–2 victory against Global at the Emperador Stadium in Mckinley Hill, Taguig.

=== Philippines Football League ===
Stallion were set to participate at the inaugural season of the Philippines Football League (PFL) in 2017. They designated Biñan Football Stadium as their home turf and by mid-January 2017 already started pre-season training and tryouts in the venue. The club renamed themselves as Stallion Laguna as part of their participation in the PFL.

In 2019, Stallion Laguna joined the Philippine Premier League (PPL), a league which was meant to replace the PFL. However they along with United Makati withdrew from the league on 26 April 2019, a day before the first match day of the league citing concerns regarding what the Stallion management see as a lack of professionalism and transparency regarding the league's management.

Stallion Laguna then participated in the 2019 PFL season which was held in lieu of the dissolved PPL.

=== AFC Cup debut ===
Stallion Laguna finished the 2022–23 Philippines Football League season in third place, which earned them qualification for the 2023–24 AFC Cup. The club was then placed in Group G alongside Australian club Central Coast Mariners, Malaysian club Terengganu and Indonesian club Bali United. On 26 October 2023, Stallion Laguna earned their first-ever point in the AFC competition after drawing 2–2 with Terengganu.

== Youth ==
Stallion Laguna operates a youth football academy known as the Stallion Youth Academy. Starting in the 2019 season, the academy will merge with the Makati Football Club (MFC), and the existing academy of the club will be renamed the Stallion MFC Youth Academy. MFC is managed by former Stallion player Selu Lozano, who will rejoin the club as both a player and corporate manager for the 2019 season.

== Kit manufacturers and shirt sponsors ==
Period	Kit manufacturer	Shirt sponsor
2011–12	Nike	Giligan's Restaurant
2013	Nike	Sta.Lucia Land Inc.^{1} Gatorade, Giligan's Restaurant ^{2}
2014–2017	Mizuno	Giligan's Restaurant ^{1}
2017	Nixare	Giligan's Restaurant ^{1}

- ^{1}Major shirt sponsor (names located at the front of the shirt).
- ^{2}Secondary sponsor (names mostly located at the back of the shirt).

== Players ==
As of 24 September 2026

Note: Flags indicate national team as defined under FIFA eligibility rules; some limited exceptions apply. Players may hold more than one non-FIFA nationality.

No.	Pos.	Nation	Player
1	GK	USA	Roberto Llamas
4	DF	IRI	Behnam Habibi
5	FW	PHI	Charles Pickering
6	MF	PHI	Javi Coscolluela
7	FW	IRI	Amir Memari
8	MF	PHI	Kyle Cosenza
9	MF	VEN	Jhansel Abreu
10	MF	IRI	Hamed Hajimehdi
11	FW	SUR	Zamoranho Ho-A-Tham
12	FW	PHI	Liam Ippolito
13	MF	PHI	Marvin Bricenio
14	FW	GHA	Kwadwo Skima
15	FW	NGR	Solomon Okereke
16	DF	PHI	Caelan McLeod
17	FW	NED	Deane Mountney
18	GK	PHI	Nelson Gasic
19	FW	AFG	Omid Musawi
21	MF	USA	Jvon Cunningham
22	MF	LBR	Christian Williams
23	GK	AFG	Keyvan Mottaghian

No.	Pos.	Nation	Player
24	MF	PHI	Sherwin Basindanan
25	DF	IRI	Morteza Pourmehdi
26	DF	LBR	Joseph Bontee
27	DF	BAH	Christopher Rahming
28	MF	CMR	Arnol Tchamgoue
29	DF	LBR	Gabriel Morris
30	FW	PHI	Jerome Abarca
31	GK	CMR	Kadji Sorel
32	DF	USA	Max Brown
33	GK	MEX	Héctor Cabrera
34	MF	IRI	Ali Chenari
35	DF	PHI	Michael Simms
36	MF	PHI	Billy Alcantara
37	MF	IRI	Amirmohammad Azadnouran
38	MF	IRI	Sam Abbasgholizadeh
39	MF	ITA	Simone Valli
40	MF	CMR	Farias Demaza
66	MF	PHI	June Biclar
71	MF	CMR	Yogo Lottin
88	DF	PHI	Nicolas Ferrer (Captain)

== Coaching staff ==
Position	Name
Team manager	(Philippines) Samantha Nierras
Head coach	(Philippines) Ernest Nierras
Assistant coach	(Philippines) Richard Leyble

=== Head coaches ===
Name	Nat	Period	Honours
Ernest Nierras	(Philippines)	2012–present	2012 UFL Cup Winner; 2013 UFL Division 1 Champion
Richard Leyble (Note: In July 2018, Assistant coach Leyble served as head coach of Stallion Laguna on an interim basis in lieu of Ernest Nierras who was completing an AFC "A" Coaching Certificate Course.)	(Philippines)	2018 (interim)	None

== Honors ==
=== Leagues ===
- United Football League Division 1
  - Winners: 2013
- United Football League Division 2
  - Runners-up: 2011

=== Cups ===
- UFL Cup
  - Winners: 2012

=== Other honors ===
- Stallions FC Invitational Cup
  - Winners: 2017

== Records ==
Season	Division	Teams	League position	PFL Cup	PFF NMCC	UFL Cup	FA Cup	League Cup	AFC Champions League	AFC Cup	Stallion Cup
2010	—	—	—	—	—	Quarter-final	—	—	—	—	—
2011	2 (P)	8	2nd	—	Semi-final	Quarter-final	—	—	—	—	—
2012	1	10	4th	—	—	1st	—	—	—	—	—
2013	1	10	1st	—	Round of 16	Quarter-final	—	—	—	—	—
2014	1	9	4th	—	—	—	3rd	Quarter-final	—	—	—
2015	1	10	5th	—	4th	4th	—	—	—	—	—
2016	1	12	6th	—	—	4th	—	—	—	—	—
2017	1	8	5th (Regular Season)	—	—	—	—	—	—	—	1st
2017	1	8	DNQ (Final Series)	—	—	—	—	—	—	—	1st
2018	1	6	4th	Semi-final	—	—	—	—	—	—	—
2019	1	7	3rd	Semi-final	—	—	—	—	—	—	—
2020	1	6	6th	—	—	—	—	—	—	—	—
2021	1	7	Canceled	3rd	—	—	—	—	—	—	—
2022	—	—	—	3rd	—	—	—	—	—	—	—
2022–23	1	5	3rd	Semi-final	—	—	—	—	—	—	—
2024	1	15	3rd	—	—	—	—	—	—	Group stage	—
2024–25	1	10	5th	—	—	—	—	—	—	—	—
2025–26	—	—	—	—	—	—	—	—	—	—	—
Updated as of 27 August 2025

=== Continental record ===
As of 13 December 2023

All results (away, home and aggregate) list Stallion's goal tally first.

Competition	Q	Pld	W	D	L	GF	GA	GD	W %
AFC Cup / AFC Champions League Two	1	6	0	1	5	9	27	−18	0.00
Total	1	6	0	1	5	9	27	−18	0.00

Season	Competition	Round	Club	Score		Agg. / Pos.
Season	Competition	Round	Club	Home	Away	Agg. / Pos.
2023–24	AFC Cup	Group stage	(Indonesia) Bali United	2–5	2–5	Group G (4th)
2023–24	AFC Cup	Group stage	(Australia) Central Coast Mariners	0–3	1–9	Group G (4th)
2023–24	AFC Cup	Group stage	(Malaysia) Terengganu	2–3	2–2	Group G (4th)

== Performance in AFC competitions ==
- AFC Cup/AFC Champions League Two: 1 appearance

2023–24: Group stage

== See also ==
- Stallion Laguna F.C. (women)
