= 2021 United City F.C. season =

United City
2021 season
- Owner: MMC Sportz Asia
- Management: Eric M. Gottschalk
- Head Coach: Frank Muescan
- Stadium: Panaad Stadium (until July)
- Biggest win: 0–10 (Aug 28 v Maharlika Manila, PFL Round 3)
- Biggest defeat: 2–0 (Jan 28 v FC Tokyo, AFC Champions League Play-off round)
Home colours	Away colours
- All statistics correct as of November 12, 2020.

The 2021 season is United City Football Club's 10th in existence and 4th season in the top flight of Philippine football. This also marks as the second season the club plays as United City, after MMC Sportz took over the management of the club, which was formerly known as Ceres–Negros.

In addition to the Philippines Football League, United City as Ceres–Negros has also participated in the second-tier continental competition, and the AFC Champions League. United City intended to continue on participating in the AFC Champions League.

== Squad ==
As of November 8, 2021

No.	Name	Nationality	Date of birth (age)	Last club
Goalkeepers
1	Anthony Pinthus	(Philippines) (Switzerland)	4 April 1998 (age 28)	(Philippines) Azkals Development Team
21	Kenry Balobo	(Philippines)	12 September 1998 (age 28)	(Philippines) Mendiola F.C. 1991
24	Florencio Badelic	(Philippines)	22 May 1994 (age 32)	(Philippines) Global F.C.
Defenders
2	Sean Kane	(Philippines)	13 May 1991 (age 35)	(Philippines) JPV Marikina F.C.
15	Arnie Pasinabo	(Philippines)	4 February 1986 (age 40)	(Philippines) Kaya F.C.–Iloilo
16	Justin Baas	(Philippines) (Netherlands)	16 March 2000 (age 26)	(Thailand) Ratchaburi Mitr Phol F.C.
22	Jordan Jarvis	(Philippines) (England) (Hong Kong)	17 April 1998 (age 28)	(Thailand) Global F.C.
27	Jung Da-hwon	(South Korea)	22 December 1987 (age 38)	(South Korea) Asan Mugunghwa FC
38	Ryan Jarvis	(Philippines) (England) (Hong Kong)	17 April 1998 (age 28)	(Thailand) Global F.C.
88	William Jay Grierson	(Philippines) (England) (Hong Kong)	27 April 1998 (age 28)	(Hong Kong) TSW Pegasus Reserves
99	Jonny Campbell	(United States)	24 September 1991 (age 34)	(Cambodia) Svay Rieng FC
Midfielders
4	Adam Reed	(Philippines) (England)	8 May 1991 (age 35)	(Malaysia) UiTM F.C.
6	Tristan Robles	(Philippines)	1 March 1994 (age 32)	
9	Mike Ott	(Philippines) (Germany)	2 March 1995 (age 31)	(Thailand) Angthong F.C.
10	Omid Nazari	(Philippines) (Sweden)	29 April 1991 (age 35)	(Indonesia) Persib Bandung
12	Stephan Schröck	(Philippines) (Germany)	21 August 1986 (age 40)	(Germany) SpVgg Greuther Fürth
14	Hikaru Minegishi	(Philippines) (Japan)	5 June 1991 (age 35)	(Thailand) JL Chiangmai United F.C.
23	Andreas Esswein	(Philippines) (Sweden)	26 January 1997 (age 29)	(Philippines) Global F.C.
30	Angelo Marasigan	(Philippines)	14 May 1992 (age 34)	(Philippines) Global F.C.
93	Amin Nazari	(Philippines) (Sweden)	26 April 1993 (age 33)	(Malaysia) Kedah Darul Aman F.C.
Forwards
3	Pocholo Bugas	(Philippines) (Sweden)	3 December 2001 (age 24)	(Philippines) Far Eastern University
7	Bienvenido Marañón	(Philippines) (Spain)	15 May 1986 (age 40)	(Spain) UD Socuéllamos
8	Kieran Hayes	(Philippines) (Sweden)	4 January 1999 (age 27)	(England) Truro City F.C.
19	Curt Dizon	(Philippines) (England)	4 February 1994 (age 32)	(Thailand) Ratchaburi Mitr Phol F.C.
20	Mark Hartmann	(Philippines) (England)	20 January 1992 (age 34)	(Malaysia) UiTM F.C.
	OJ Porteria	(Philippines) (United States)	9 May 1994 (age 32)	(Thailand) Ratchaburi Mitr Phol F.C.
Players loaned out / left during season
11	Miguel Clariño	(Philippines)	1 February 1997 (age 29)	(Philippines) Azkals Development Team

== Transfers ==
Note: Flags indicate national team as defined under FIFA eligibility rules. Players may hold more than one non-FIFA nationality.

=== Transfers in ===
Position	Player	Transferred To	Ref
GK	(Philippines) (Switzerland) Anthony Pinthus	(Philippines) Azkals Development Team	Undisclosed
GK	(Philippines) Kenry Balobo	(Philippines) Mendiola F.C. 1991	Undisclosed
DF	(Philippines) (Netherlands) Justin Baas	(Thailand) Ratchaburi Mitr Phol	Free
DF	(Philippines) (England) (Hong Kong) William Jay Grierson	(Hong Kong) TSW Pegasus Reserves	Free
DF	(Philippines) (Hong Kong) Jordan Jarvis	(Philippines) Global F.C.	Free
MF	(Philippines) (Sweden) Omid Nazari	(Indonesia) Persib Bandung	Free
MF	(Philippines) (Sweden) Amin Nazari	(Malaysia) Kedah Darul Aman F.C.	Free
MF	(South Korea) Jung Da-hwon	(South Korea) Asan Mugunghwa FC	Free
MF	(Philippines) (England) Adam Reed	(Malaysia) UiTM F.C.	Free
MF	(Philippines) (Sweden) Andreas Esswein	(Philippines) Global F.C.	Free
MF	(United States) Jonathan Campbell	(Cambodia) Svay Rieng	Free
FW	(Philippines) (England) Curt Dizon	(Thailand) Ratchaburi Mitr Phol	Free
FW	(Philippines) (England) Mark Hartmann	(Malaysia) UiTM F.C.	Free
FW	(Philippines) (England) Kieran Hayes	(England) Truro City F.C.	Free
FW	(Philippines) (United States) OJ Porteria	(Thailand) Ratchaburi Mitr Phol	Undisclosed

=== Transfers out ===
Position	Player	Transferred To	Ref
MF	(Philippines) (Germany) Manuel Ott	(Malaysia) Melaka United	Free
FW	(Philippines) (United States) OJ Porteria	(Thailand) Ratchaburi Mitr Phol	Free
FW	(Philippines) (Italy) Dennis Villanueva	(Thailand) Nakhon Ratchasima	Free
FW	(Japan) Takashi Odawara	(Maldives) Maziya S&RC	Free
FW	(Senegal) Robert Lopez Mendy	(Cambodia) Svay Rieng	Free
DF	(Philippines) Miguel Clarino	(Philippines) Maharlika Manila	Free
MF	(New Zealand) Jai Ingham	N/A	Free

== Team statistics ==
=== Appearances and goals ===
As of 27 Sept 2020

No.	Pos.	Player	League		Copa Paulino Alcantara		AFC Champions League		Total	
No.	Pos.	Player	Apps.	Goals	Apps.	Goals	Apps.	Goals	Apps.	Goals
1	GK	(Philippines) Anthony Pinthus	0	0	0	0	6	0	0	0
2	DF	(Philippines) Sean Kane	0	0	0	0	4(1)	0	0	0
3	FW	(Philippines) Pocholo Bugas	0	0	0	0	2(3)	0	0	0
4	MF	(Philippines) (England) Adam Reed	0	0	0	0	1(2)	0	0	0
6	MF	(Philippines) Tristan Robles	0	0	0	0	1	0	0	0
7	FW	(Philippines) (Spain) Bienvenido Marañón	0	0	0	0	5	1	0	0
8	FW	(Philippines) (England) Kieran Hayes	0	0	0	0	0(2)	0	0	0
9	MF	(Philippines) (Germany) Mike Ott	0	0	0	0	4	0	0	0
10	MF	(Philippines) (Sweden) Omid Nazari	0	0	0	0	5	0	0	0
12	MF	(Philippines) (Germany) Stephan Schröck	0	0	0	0	5	1	0	0
14	MF	(Philippines) (Japan) Hikaru Minegishi	0	0	0	0	5	0	0	0
15	DF	(Philippines) Arnie Pasinabo	0	0	0	0	1	0	0	0
16	DF	(Philippines) (Netherlands) Justin Bass	0	0	0	0	4(1)	0	0	0
17	MF	(New Zealand) (Australia) Jai Ingham	0	0	0	0	3(1)	0	0	0
19	FW	(Philippines) (England) Curt Dizon	0	0	0	0	3(3)	0	0	0
20	FW	(Philippines) (England) Mark Hartmann	0	0	0	0	3(2)	2	0	0
22	DF	(Philippines) (Hong Kong) (England) Jordan Jarvis	0	0	0	0	1(1)	0	0	0
23	MF	(Philippines) (Sweden) Andreas Esswein	0	0	0	0	0(1)	0	0	0
27	DF	(South Korea) Jung Da-hwon	0	0	0	0	5	0	0	0
30	MF	(Philippines) Angelo Marasigan	0	0	0	0	1(2)	0	0	0
88	DF	(Philippines) (Hong Kong) (England) William Jay Grierson	0	0	0	0	2	0	0	0
93	MF	(Philippines) (Sweden) Amin Nazari	0	0	0	0	5	0	0	0
Players who have played this season and/or sign for the season but had left the club or on loan to other club
11	DF	(Philippines) Miguel Clariño	0	0	0	0	0(2)	0	2	0

== Competitions ==
=== Group A ===
Pos	Team	Pld	W	D	L	GF	GA	GD	Pts	Qualification
1	Stallion Laguna	1	1	0	0	1	0	+1	3	Semi-finals
2	Dynamic Herb Cebu	1	0	0	1	0	1	−1	0	Semi-finals
3	United City	0	0	0	0	0	0	0	0	Withdrew

Source: PFL

10 November 2021 2	United City	v	Stallion Laguna	Carmona
19:30 UTC+8				Stadium: PFF National Training Center

13 November 2021 3	Cebu	v	United City	Carmona
19:30 UTC+8				Stadium: PFF National Training Center

=== AFC Champions League ===
Pos	Team	Pld	W	D	L	GF	GA	GD	Pts	Qualification	KAW	DAE	UNI	BJG
1	(Japan) Kawasaki Frontale	6	6	0	0	27	3	+24	18	Advance to Round of 16	—	3–2	8–0	4–0
2	(South Korea) Daegu FC	6	4	0	2	22	6	+16	12	Advance to Round of 16	1–3	—	7–0	5–0
3	(Philippines) United City	6	1	1	4	4	24	−20	4		0–2	0–4	—	1–1
4	(China) Beijing Guoan	6	0	1	5	3	23	−20	1		0–7	0–3	2–3	—

Source: AFC
Rules for classification: Tiebreakers

Win Draw Loss

==== Group stage ====
26 June 2021 Matchday 1	United City F.C. (Philippines)	1–1	(China) Beijing Guoan	Tashkent, Uzbekistan
	Stephan Schröck 28'; Mike Ott (yellow card) 41'	Report	Liang Shaowen 73'; Shi Yucheng (yellow card) 21'; Guo Quanbo (yellow card) 78'	Stadium: Bunyodkor Stadium; Referee: Mooud Bonyadifar (Iran); Man of the Match: (China) Liang Shaowen

29 June 2021 Matchday 2	Daegu FC (South Korea)	7–0	(Philippines) United City F.C.	Tashkent, Uzbekistan
	Cesinha 23'; Edgar 42'; Kim Jin-hyuk 45+2'; An Yong-woo 62' 72'; Park Han-bin 90'; Jung Chi-in 90+5' (pen.); Tsubasa Nishi (yellow card) 17'; Lee Yong-rae (yellow card) 38'; Park Byung-Hyun (yellow card) 88'	Report	Omid Nazari (yellow card) 50'; Stephan Schröck (yellow card) 61'	Stadium: Bunyodkor Stadium; Referee: Mohd Amirul Izwan Yaacob (Malaysia); Man of the Match: (South Korea) An Yong-woo

2 July 2021 Matchday 3	Kawasaki Frontale (Japan)	8–0	(Philippines) United City F.C.	Tashkent, Uzbekistan
	Kaoru Mitoma 33', 82'; Ryota Oshima 42'; Leandro Damião 50'; Kento Tachibanada 56', 65', 70'; Yasuto Wakizaka 90+2'; João Schmidt (yellow card) 25'	Report	Sean Kane (yellow card) 25'; Stephan Schröck (yellow card) 43'; Jung Da-hwon (yellow card) 90+1'	Stadium: Lokomotiv Stadium; Referee: Hasan Akrami (Iran); Man of the Match: (Japan) Kento Tachibanada

5 July 2021 Matchday 4	United City F.C. (Philippines)	0–2	(Japan) Kawasaki Frontale	Tashkent, Uzbekistan
	Tristan Robles (yellow card) 12'; Adam Reed (yellow card) 84'	Report	Kei Chinen 18'; Tatsuya Hasegawa 78'	Stadium: Lokomotiv Stadium; Referee: Nivon Robesh Gamini (Sri Lanka); Man of the Match: (Philippines) Anthony Pinthus

8 July 2021 Matchday 5	Beijing Guoan (China)	2–3	(Philippines) United City F.C.	Tashkent, Uzbekistan
	Jiang Wenhao 1'; Leng Jixuan 4'; Mohemati Naibijiang (yellow card) 90'	Report	Mark Hartmann 59' 80'; Bienvenido Marañón 69'; Sean Kane (yellow card) 20'	Stadium: Lokomotiv Stadium; Referee: Ahmad Yacoub Ibrahim (Jordan)

11 July 2021 Matchday 6	United City F.C. (Philippines)	0–4	(South Korea) Daegu FC	Tashkent, Uzbekistan
	Angelo Marasigan (yellow card) 90+4'	Report	Tsubasa Nishi 37'; Lee Keun-ho 48'; Edgar 58' (yellow card) 90+3'; Jung Chi-in 73'; Jo Jin-woo (yellow card) 24'; Kim Jin-hyuk (yellow card) 43'	Stadium: Bunyodkor Stadium; Referee: Ilgiz Tantashev (Uzbekistan)
