= Swedish Iranians =

People of Iranian nationality who have settled in Sweden

svenskiranier ایرانیان سوئد

Total population
- 121,019

Regions with significant populations
- Stockholm, Gothenburg, Malmö, Uppsala.

Languages
- Swedish, Persian (Armenian, Azerbaijani, Kurdish, Luri, and other languages of Iran)

Religion
- Shi'a Islam, Irreligion, Christianity, Baháʼí Faith, Judaism, Sunni Islam, Zoroastrianism, Other

Swedish Iranians or Swedish Persians consist of people of Iranian nationality who have settled in Sweden, as well as Swedish residents and citizens of Iranian heritage. As of 2019, there were 80,136 residents of Sweden born in Iran, as well as 40,883 born in Sweden with at least one Iranian-born parent.

== Terminology ==
Swedish-Iranian is in some cases used interchangeably with Swedish-Persian, partly due to the fact that many are members of the Persian ethnic group, which comprise about 65% of Iran's population. While the majority of Iranians come from Persian backgrounds, there is a significant number of non-Persian Iranians such as Azeris, Lurs, and Kurds within the Iranian community of Sweden. "Swedish-Iranian" is thus more inclusive, since the label "Persian" excludes other non-Persian iranians that have moved to Sweden.

The tendency among Swedish Iranians to categorize themselves as "Persian" rather than "Iranian", is sometimes also a strategy used by some members of the group to dissociate themselves from the Islamic regime of Iran, which has been in charge since the 1979 Revolution. The name of the country of Iran was known in much of the world as "Persia", prior to a name change in 1935.

== Demographics ==
There are approximately 63,828 people born in Iran living in Sweden today, as well as 28,600 people born in Sweden with at least one parent born in Iran. They are one of Sweden's largest immigrant groups, accounting for about 1.7% of the population.

The very first wave of Iranian refugees consisted of 5,000 Iranian refugees who fled to Sweden in 1979-1980 most of them were middle-aged, middle-class Pahlavi supporters who were opposing the revolution. When the Iran–Iraq War broke out in 1980, almost 20,000 Iranian citizens found asylum in Sweden. Second generation Iranian Swedes are well-represented in higher education and in some well paying professions like dentistry and engineering.

About 60% percent of Swedish Iranians go on to higher education – more than the Swedish average (45%). Iranian culture with its emphasis on education may be part of the reason for this. Becoming an engineer or a doctor is a mantra in many families. Abundantly represented minorities amongst the Swedish Iranians, like in other Iranian diaspora nations are Azerbaijanis, Kurds, Armenians and Assyrians.

== Notable Iranians in Sweden ==
- Snoh Aalegra, singer and songwriter
- Mana Aghaee, poet and writer
- Minoo Akhtarzand, governor of Jönköping County
- Milad Alami, film director
- Poya Asbaghi, football manager
- Ajda Asgari, politician
- William Atashkadeh, professional footballer
- Hanif Bali, MP and part of the party executive of the Moderate Party
- Sean Banan, singer, comedian and entertainer
- Arash Bayat, footballer
- Hanni Beronius, beauty queen and Miss Universe Sweden 2012
- Cameron Cartio, singer
- Akira Corassani, UFC fighter
- Ashk Dahlén, scholar, linguist, translator
- Reza Khelili Dylami, politician
- Ali Esbati, politician
- Athena Farrokhzad, poet
- Rashid Farivar, politician
- Mohammad Fazlhashemi, professor in History of Ideas, Umeå University
- Azita Ghahreman, poet, translator, writer, member of the International PEN
- Saman Ghoddos, international footballer*
- Ali Ghodsi, businessman
- Adam Hemati, footballer for Persepolis F.C.
- Jasmine Kara, singer and songwriter
- Arash Labaf, platinum-selling artist
- Lina Leandersson, actress
- Janet Leon, singer
- Lasse Lindroth, comedian and actor
- Parisa Liljestrand, Minister of Culture.
- Reza Madadi, professional MMA fighter and convicted criminal.
- Jila Mossaed, poet, member of the Swedish Academy, Chair No. 15
- Babak Najafi, film director, screenwriter, and cinematographer
- Marall Nasiri, actress
- Amin Nazari, professional football player
- Omid Nazari, professional football player*
- Shima Niavarani, actress
- Bahar Pars, actress
- Trita Parsi, founder and president of the National Iranian American Council
- Nahid Persson Sarvestani, film director
- Zinat Pirzadeh, comedian
- Laleh Pourkarim, singer-songwriter
- Romina Pourmokhtari, Minister for the Environment.
- Arash Pournouri, music manager
- Daniel Rahimi, professional Ice hockey player
- Eddie Razaz, singer
- Behrang Safari, Swedish international footballer
- Ilya Salmanzadeh, music producer
- Nima Sanandaji, scientist and author
- Ardalan Shekarabi, politician
- Maryam Yazdanfar, Riksdag politician
- Sara Zahedi, mathematician and winner of European Mathematical Society prize
- Nina Zanjani, actress
- Mika Zibanejad, professional Ice hockey player

== See also ==
- Iran-Sweden relations
- Iranian diaspora
