= 2020 United City F.C. season =

United City
2020 season
- Owner: MMC Sportz Asia (from July)
- Management: Leo Rey V. Yanson (Chairman; until July); Michael Hosking; Eric M. Gottschalk (Co-founders; from July)
- Head Coach: Frank Muescan (interim)
- Stadium: Panaad Stadium (until July)
- Philippines Football League: Winners
- AFC Champions League: Play-off round
- AFC Cup: Group stage (cancelled)
- Top goalscorer: League: Bienvenido Marañón (7); All: Bienvenido Marañón (13)
- Biggest win: 0–10 (Aug 28 v Maharlika Manila, PFL Round 3)
- Biggest defeat: 2–0 (Jan 28 v FC Tokyo, AFC Champions League Play-off round)
Home colours	Away colours
- All statistics correct as of November 12, 2020.

The 2020 season is United City Football Club's 9th in existence and 4th season in the top flight of Philippine football. This also marks as the first season the club plays as United City, after MMC Sportz took over the management of the club, which was formerly known as Ceres–Negros.

In addition to the Philippines Football League, United City as Ceres–Negros has also participated in the second-tier continental competition, the AFC Cup which was suspended due to the COVID-19 pandemic. United City intended to continue on participating in the AFC Cup under its new name, if the cancelled continental competition have resumed play.

== Players ==
Note: Flags indicate national team as defined under FIFA eligibility rules. Players may hold more than one non-FIFA nationality.

No.	Pos.	Nat.	Name	Notes
1	GK	(Philippines)	Anthony Pinthus (on loan from ADT)	Second nationality: (Switzerland)
2	DF	(Philippines)	Sean Kane	
3	FW	(Philippines)	Pocholo Bugas	
5	MF	(Philippines)	Mike Ott	Second nationality: (Germany)
6	MF	(Philippines)	Tristan Kit Robles	
7	MF	(Spain)	Bienvenido Marañón	
8	MF	(Philippines)	Manny Ott	Second nationality: (Germany)
9	MF	(Japan)	Takashi Odawara	
10	MF	(Philippines)	OJ Porteria	Second nationality: (United States)
11	DF	(Philippines)	Miguel Clarino	
12	MF	(Philippines)	Stephan Schröck (captain)	Second nationality: (Germany)
13	DF	(Philippines)	Dennis Villanueva	Second nationality: (Italy)
14	MF	(Philippines)	Jorrel Aristorenas	
15	DF	(Philippines)	Arnie Pasinabo	
17	FW	(Senegal)	Robert Lopez Mendy	
18	DF	(Philippines)	Joshua Dutosme	
22	DF	(Philippines)	Jordan Jarvis	Second Nationality: (Hong Kong)
24	GK	(Philippines)	Florencio Badelic Jr.	
25	GK	(Philippines)	Ronilo Bayan Jr.	
29	MF	(Philippines)	Hikaru Minegishi	Second nationality: (Japan)
30	MF	(Philippines)	Angélo Marasigan	Second nationality: (Belgium)

Updated to match played on November 9, 2020.

== Transfers ==
Note: Flags indicate national team as defined under FIFA eligibility rules. Players may hold more than one non-FIFA nationality.

=== Transfers in ===
Date	Position	Nationality	Name	Age	From	Type	Ref.
December 20, 2019	FW/AM	(Philippines)	Mark Hartmann	27	(Thailand) Nakhon Ratchasima	Transfer	
December 20, 2019	MF	(Philippines)	Arnie Pasinabo	33	(Philippines) Kaya–Iloilo	Transfer	
December 20, 2019	MF	(Philippines)	Hikaru Minegishi	28	(Thailand) Chiangmai United	Transfer	
December 2019	DF	(Philippines)	Amani Aguinaldo	24	(Malaysia) PKNP	Loan Return	
December 31, 2019	DF	(Philippines)	Joshua Grommen	23	(Thailand) Sukhothai	Transfer	
February 6, 2020	MF	(Philippines)	Manuel Ott	27	(Thailand) Ratchaburi Mitr Phol	Transfer	
August 13, 2020	MF	(Philippines)	Jordan Jarvis	22	(Hong Kong) Resources Capital	Transfer	
August 13, 2020	GK	(Philippines)	Anthony Pinthus	22	(Philippines) ADT	Loan	
August 13, 2020	MF	(Philippines)	Pocholo Bugas	18	(Philippines) Far Eastern University	Transfer	
August 13, 2020	MF	(Philippines)	Jorrel Aristorenas	26	(Philippines) Global	Transfer	

=== Transfers out ===
Date	Position	Nationality	Name	Age	To	Type	Ref.
December 20, 2019	MF	(Philippines)	Miguel Tanton	30	Unattached	Free	
January 2, 2020	DF	(Philippines)	Amani Aguinaldo	24	(Thailand) Trat	Transfer	
January 7, 2020	DF	(Philippines)	Carli de Murga	31	(Thailand) Chonburi	Transfer	
January 7, 2020	FW	(Philippines)	Charles Barberan				
February 22, 2020	FW/AM	(Philippines)	Mark Hartmann	28	(Malaysia) Petaling Jaya City	Transfer	
June 1, 2020 (Note: A force majeure was invoked due to the COVID-19 pandemic, when United City was still known as Ceres–Negros and under the ownership of Leo Rey Yanson, which forced the termination of contract of all the club's players at the time. Departure of some of the players were announced or reported at a later date. When MMC Sportz Asia took over the club, and rename it as United City, it had to re-sign the club's players. Players who were eventually re-signed are not included in this table.)	FW/AM	(Philippines)	James Younghusband	33	—N/a	Retired	
June 1, 2020	DF	(Philippines)	Joshua Grommen	23	(Australia) Brisbane City	Free	
June 1, 2020	DF	(Philippines)	Jeffrey Christiaens	29	Unattached	Free	
June 1, 2020	DF	(Spain)	Súper	28	Unattached	Free	
June 1, 2020	GK	(Philippines)	Roland Müller	32	Unattached	Free	
June 1, 2020	MF	(Philippines)	Dylan De Bruycker	22	Unattached	Free	
June 1, 2020	DF	(Philippines)	Junior Muñoz	33	Unattached	Free	

== Kits ==
Supplier: Grand Sport (Ceres–Negros), Montè Athletics (United City) / Sponsor: Ceres Liner (Ceres–Negros), MARC Manila Regenerative Center (United City)

Ceres–Negros home (Asia)	Ceres–Negros away (Asia)	United City home (PFL)	United City away (PFL)

== Competitions ==
=== Philippines Football League ===
==== Standings ====
Pos	Team	Pld	W	D	L	GF	GA	GD	Pts	Qualification
1	United City (C)	5	4	0	1	25	3	+22	12	Qualification for 2021 AFC Champions League group stage and 2022 AFC Champions League group stage (Note: As a result of the 2021 Philippines Football League being cancelled due to the COVID-19 pandemic in the Philippines, the PFF nominated the 2020 champions, United City, as the participating club in the 2021 AFC Champions League Group Stage.)
2	Kaya–Iloilo	5	3	2	0	5	2	+3	11	Qualification for 2021 AFC Champions League qualifying play-offs
3	Azkals Development Team (Note: The Azkals Development Team are a guest team for the PFL and ineligible to qualify for AFC club competitions.) (G)	5	3	0	2	9	2	+7	9	
4	Mendiola 1991	5	1	2	2	2	8	−6	5	Standby team for AFC Cup group stage (Note: Due to the COVID-19 pandemic in the Philippines, the 2020 Copa Paulino Alcantara was cancelled by the Philippine Football Federation. As a result, the 2020 Philippines Football League runners-up will qualify for the AFC Champions League qualifying play-offs, and the third place team will qualify for the 2021 AFC Cup unless the PFL runners-up fail to qualify for the AFC Champions League.)
5	Maharlika Manila	5	1	0	4	2	19	−17	3	
6	Stallion Laguna	5	0	2	3	3	12	−9	2	

Source: PFL
Rules for classification: 1) Points; 2) Goal difference; 3) Goals scored.
(C) Champions; (G) Guests
Notes:

Results summary

Overall								Home						Away					
Pld	W	D	L	GF	GA	GD	Pts	W	D	L	GF	GA	GD	W	D	L	GF	GA	GD
5	4	0	1	25	3	+22	12	2	0	0	9	0	+9	2	0	1	16	3	+13

Last updated: November 9, 2020.
Source: PFL

==== Results by round ====
Round	1	2	3	4	5
Ground	H	A	A	H	H
Result	W	W	W	W	L
Position	1	1	1	1	1

Updated to match(es) played on November 9, 2020. Source: PFL
A = Away; H = Home; W = Win; D = Draw; L = Loss

==== Matches ====
October 28, 2020 1	United City	1–0	Azkals Development Team	Carmona
16:30 UTC+8	Mi. Ott 25'			Stadium: PFF National Training Centre; Referee: Rodney Leyble (Philippines)

October 31, 2020 2	Mendiola 1991	0–6	United City	Carmona
14:30 UTC+8			Marañón 12', 25', 44' (pen.); Lopez Mendy 38', 60'; Mi. Ott 52' (pen.)	Stadium: PFF National Training Centre; Referee: Rodney Leyble (Philippines)

November 3, 2020 3	Maharlika Manila	0–10	United City	Carmona
20:00 UTC+8			Mi. Ott 16', 73'; Marañón 19'; Schröck 33'; Porteria 39', 71', 75' (pen.); Lopez Mendy 49', 57', 63'	Stadium: PFF National Training Centre; Referee: Meliton Pelayo (Philippines)

November 6, 2020 4	United City	7–1	Stallion Laguna	Carmona
20:00 UTC+8	Mi. Ott 6', 54'; Odawara 25'; Marañón 58', 66', 71'; Porteria 71'		N'Dour 12'	Stadium: PFF National Training Centre; Referee: Meliton Pelayo (Philippines)

November 9, 2020 5	United City	1–2	Kaya–Iloilo	Carmona
19:30 UTC+8	Ma. Ott 83'		Daniels 15'; Mitchell 38'	Stadium: PFF National Training Centre; Referee: Clifford Daypuyat (Philippines)

=== AFC Champions League ===
==== Qualifying play-offs ====
January 14, 2020 Preliminary Round 1	Ceres–Negros (Philippines)	3–2	(Myanmar) Shan United	Manila, Philippines
19:30 UTC+8	Lopez Mendy 5'; Marañón 40'; Porteria 79'		Zin Min Tun 73'; Djawa 87'	Stadium: Rizal Memorial Stadium (Note: Ceres–Negros played their home matches at Rizal Memorial Stadium, Manila, instead of their regular home stadium Panaad Stadium, Bacolod, which is undergoing renovation.)

January 21, 2020 Preliminary Round 2	Port (Thailand)	0–1	(Philippines) Ceres–Negros	Bangkok, Thailand
19:00 UTC+7			Schröck 51'	Stadium: PAT Stadium

January 28, 2020 Play-off round	FC Tokyo (Japan)	2–0	(Philippines) Ceres–Negros	Tokyo, Japan
19:00 UTC+9	Muroya 48'; Adaílton 89'	Live Report; Stats Report		Stadium: Ajinomoto Stadium; Attendance: 6,630; Referee: Masoud Tufayelieh (Syria)

=== AFC Cup ===
==== Group stage ====
The group stage draw was held on December 10, 2019 at the AFC House in Kuala Lumpur, Malaysia. Ceres–Negros were drawn in Group G alongside Indonesian Liga 1 champions Bali United, Vietnamese V.League 1 third-placers (Note: Hà Nội, the league champions and Vietnamese Cup winners, failed to obtain an AFC license (due to their U15 team not participating in the Vietnam National U15 Youth League), and therefore were not eligible for continental qualification. As a result, all AFC Champions League and AFC Cup berths are distributed to the remaining teams by league position: runners-up Ho Chi Minh City FC and third place Than Quảng Ninh.) Than Quảng Ninh, and Cambodian C-League winners Svay Rieng who qualified via play-offs.

Pos	Team	Pld	W	D	L	GF	GA	GD	Pts	CER	TQN	SVR	BAL
1	(Philippines) Ceres–Negros	3	2	1	0	10	2	+8	7	—	2–2	4–0	4–0
2	(Vietnam) Than Quảng Ninh	3	1	1	1	7	7	0	4	~~29 Sep~~	—	~~23 Sep~~	~~26 Sep~~
3	(Cambodia) Svay Rieng	3	1	0	2	3	9	−6	3 (Note: Head-to-head points: Svay Rieng 3, Bali United 0.)	~~26 Sep~~	1–4	—	2–1
4	(Indonesia) Bali United	3	1	0	2	5	7	−2	3	~~23 Sep~~	4–1	~~29 Sep~~	—

Source: AFC
Rules for classification: Tiebreakers
Notes:

February 11, 2020 Matchday 1	Ceres–Negros (Philippines)	4–0	(Cambodia) Svay Rieng	Manila
19:30 UTC+8	Odawara 12'; Grommen 14'; Marañón 55', 70'	Live Report; Stats Report		Stadium: Rizal Memorial Stadium; Attendance: 4,100; Referee: C. R. Srikrishna (India)

February 25, 2020 Matchday 2	Ceres–Negros (Philippines)	2–2	(Vietnam) Than Quảng Ninh	Manila (Note: Due to the decision of the Vietnamese government to suspend sporting events in February in response to the COVID-19 pandemic, the group stage matches which Vietnamese teams were supposed to host were switched with the corresponding away matches.)
18:00 UTC+7	Marañón 45+3' (pen.); Porteria 62'	Live Report; Stats Report	Lynch 26'; Nguyễn Hải Huy 70'	Stadium: Rizal Memorial Stadium; Attendance: 5,078; Referee: Mohd Amirul Izwan Yaacob (Malaysia)

March 11, 2020 Matchday 3	Ceres–Negros (Philippines)	4-0	(Indonesia) Bali United	Manila
19:30 UTC+8	Porteria 35'; Marañón 54' (pen.), 69'; Lopez Mendy 73'	Live Report; Stats Report		Stadium: Rizal Memorial Stadium; Attendance: 0 (Note: The match between Ceres–Negros and Bali United in Manila was played behind closed doors due to a pandemic of COVID-19 in the Philippines.); Referee: Sadullo Gulmurodi (Tajikistan)

September 23, 2020 Matchday 4	Bali United (Indonesia)	Cancelled	(Philippines) Ceres–Negros	Cẩm Phả
--:-- UTC+8				Stadium: Cẩm Phả Stadium

September 26, 2020 Matchday 5	Svay Rieng (Cambodia)	Cancelled	(Philippines) Ceres–Negros	Cẩm Phả
--:-- UTC+6:30				Stadium: Cẩm Phả Stadium

September 29, 2020 Matchday 6	Than Quảng Ninh (Vietnam)	Cancelled	(Philippines) Ceres–Negros	Cẩm Phả
--:-- UTC+7				Stadium: Cẩm Phả Stadium
