= Hans Prytz =

Swedish footballer and manager

Personal information
- Date of birth: 14 May 1963 (age 63)
- Place of birth: Sweden
- Position: Defender

Youth career
- Örgryte IS

Senior career*
Years	Team	Apps	(Gls)
1981–1991	Örgryte IS		
1992	BK Häcken		

Managerial career
- 1993–1996: Stenungsunds IF
- 1997: Gunnilse IS
- 1998–1999: Lerums IS
- 2000–2001: IF Warta
- 2002–2003: IK Zenith
- 2005–2006: Jitex BK
- 2009–2011: Jitex BK
- 2011–2013: Örgryte IS
- * Club domestic league appearances and goals

Hans Prytz (born 14 May 1963) is a Swedish football manager and former player. A defender, he spent his entire playing career at Örgryte IS with the exception of the last year. At Örgryte, he also won the Swedish championship in 1985. After retiring, he spent years working as a manager for lower league clubs and then moved on to coaching women's football with IK Zenith and Jitex BK. In November 2011 he took over as manager for his former club Örgryte, which had slipped into the third tier of Swedish football. The next season, he helped them win promotion back into Superettan.
