= Omid Nazari =

Iranian footballer (born 1991)

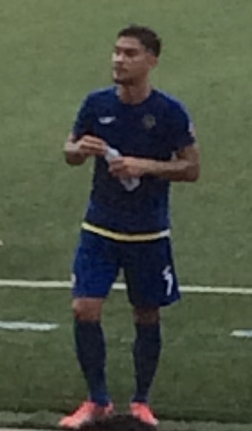
- Nazari with Global Cebu in 2016

Personal information
- Full name: Omid David Lazarte Nazari
- Date of birth: 29 April 1991 (age 35)
- Place of birth: Malmö, Sweden
- Height: 1.84 m (6 ft 1/2 in)
- Position: Midfielder

Youth career
- 1996–2011: Malmö FF

Senior career*
| Years | Team | Apps | (Gls) |
| 2010–2011 | Malmö FF | 4 | (0) |
| 2011–2015 | Ängelholms FF | 60 | (3) |
| 2015–2016 | FC Rosengård | 2 | (0) |
| 2016–2017 | Global | 15 | (8) |
| 2017 | Melaka United | | |
| 2017–2019 | Ceres–Negros | 58 | (3) |
| 2019–2021 | Persib Bandung | 20 | (1) |
| 2021 | United City | | |
| 2022 | Negeri Sembilan | 20 | (0) |
| 2023 | Terengganu | 8 | (1) |
| 2024– | One Taguig | | |

International career^{‡}
| 2012 | Iran | 5 | (1) |
- * Club domestic league appearances and goals as of 29 September 2023 ‡ National team caps and goals as of 15 December 2012

Omid Nazari (Persian: امید نظری, born 29 April 1991) is a professional footballer who plays as a midfielder for One Taguig of the Philippines Football League. Born in Sweden, he has represented the Iran national team.

== Career ==
=== Club career ===
==== Malmö FF ====
Nazari made his Allsvenskan debut for Malmö FF in a match against IFK Norrköping on 3 July 2011. He made his UEFA debut on 13 July 2011 in the 2011–12 UEFA Champions League second qualifying round against HB Tórshavn. It was announced on 15 December 2011 that Nazari would leave Malmö to join Superettan side Ängelholms FF.

==== Ängelholms FF ====
When signing for Ängelholms FF, the coaching staff especially wanted to lift Nazari's potential, technique, play intelligence and speed, combined with a good character off the field. Nazari played there for three seasons.

==== FC Rosengård ====
After injuries, Nazari lost his motivation to play football, but he still wanted to try to play at least once more in a professional capacity. Therefore, he signed for FC Rosengård in Malmö.

While playing for FC Rosengård, Nazari reawakened his love for football, and he would later find his way to Asia.

==== Global F.C. ====
Nazari was signed by Global of the Philippine United Football League in January 2016. According to Offside (magazine), Nazari described it as an adventure, a way to discover his mother's homeland and an opportunity to chase a larger contract in Asia. Nazari made his debut at the 2016 UFL Cup scoring a hat-trick in the 7–0 win over Pasargad Nazari is registered as a Filipino player in the United Football League. Nazari made his debut in the League against Stallion coming in as a substitute. He scored his first league goal for Global in an 8-nil thrashing win against Laos.

==== Melaka United ====
On November 17, 2016, Melaka United announced that they had signed Nazari. Shortly after, he came down with severe food poisoning and lost several kilograms of weight, therefore missed a majority of pre-season training which included friendly matches. His contract was then terminated in January 2017 due to difficulty in regaining fitness after Nazari suffered from food poisoning.

==== Ceres-Negros F.C. ====
By late-March 2017, Nazari is already with Ceres-Negros which is set to participate in the inaugural season of the Philippines Football League. Nazari won the league title with Ceres in both the 2017 and 2018 season.

==== Persib Bandung ====
On 20 August 2019, Nazari joined Liga 1 club Persib Bandung. and made his debut against PSS Sleman. He scored his first goal for Persib Bandung against Arema leading to a 3–1 victory for Persib Bandung.

== International career ==
Like his brother, Nazari was born in Sweden and his parents are from Iran and the Philippines. He was, therefore, eligible to play for Sweden, Iran or the Philippines. On 12 May 2012 the Iranian side's manager, Carlos Queiroz, confirmed that Omid will join Team Melli in a camp in Turkey before the friendly match against Albania. He had his first international appearance for Team Melli in Hungary against Tunisia in a friendly on 16 August 2012. His first national team goal came months later against Yemen on 15 December.

Since his five appearances for the Iran team were friendlies and West Asian Football Federation Championship matches, Nazari is still available to switch allegiance to the Philippines or Sweden. In March 2016, he received his first international call-up to the Philippines national team. However, he has yet to receive clearance from FIFA to make the switch.

== Career statistics ==
=== Club ===
As of 29 December 2018

| Club performance | | | League | | Cup | | Continental | | Total | |
| Season | Club | League | Apps | Goals | Apps | Goals | Apps | Goals | Apps | Goals |
|---|---|---|---|---|---|---|---|---|---|---|
| 2011 | Malmö | Allsvenskan | 4 | 0 | 0 | 0 | 1 | 0 | 5 | 0 |
| 2011 | Ängelholm | Superettan | 7 | 1 | – | | – | | 7 | 1 |
| 2012 | Ängelholm | Superettan | 24 | 1 | 1 | 0 | – | | 25 | 1 |
| 2013 | Ängelholm | Superettan | 21 | 1 | 1 | 0 | – | | 22 | 1 |
| 2014 | Ängelholm | Superettan | 8 | 0 | 1 | 0 | – | | 9 | 0 |
| 2015 | Rosengård | Division 2 | 1 | 0 | 0 | 0 | – | | 1 | 0 |
| 2016 | Global Cebu | PFL | 17 | 9 | 3 | 1 | – | | 18 | 9 |
| 2017 | Ceres Negros | PFL | 3 | 0 | 0 | 0 | 0 | 0 | 3 | 0 |
| 2018 | Ceres Negros | PFL | 0 | 0 | 0 | 0 | 12 | 1 | 12 | 1 |
| 2019 | Persib Bandung | Liga 1 | 17 | 1 | 0 | 0 | 0 | 0 | 17 | 1 |
| 2020 | Persib Bandung | Liga 1 | 3 | 0 | 0 | 0 | 0 | 0 | 3 | 0 |
| 2021 | United City | PFL | 0 | 0 | 0 | 0 | 5 | 0 | 5 | 0 |
| Career total | | | 83 | 11 | 6 | 1 | 13 | 1 | 102 | 13 |

=== International goals ===
Scores and results list Iran's goal tally first.

| # | Date | Venue | Opponent | Score | Result | Competition |
|---|---|---|---|---|---|---|
| 1 | 15 December 2012 | Al-Sadaqua Walsalam Stadium, Kuwait City, Kuwait | Yemen | 1–0 | 2–1 | 2012 WAFF Championship |

== Honours ==
Ceres Negros

- Philippines Football League: 2017, 2018

Terengganu

- Malaysia Cup runner-up: 2023

== See also ==
- Swedish-Iranians
