= Aghaei =

Aghaei or Aghaee is a surname. Notable people with the surname include:

- Amir Aghaei (born 1970), Iranian actor and author
- Abbas Aghaei (born 1977), Iranian footballer
- Mana Aghaee (born 1973), Iranian-Swedish poet, translator, and podcast producer
- Maysam Aghaei (born 1990), Iranian footballer
- Nasser Aghaei (1944–2009), Iranian boxer
- Saeid Aghaei (born 1995), Iranian footballer
- Sorayya Aghaei (born 1996), Iranian badminton player

== See also ==
- Mohsen Amoo-Aghaei, Iranian Paralympic athlete
