= Ashk Dahlén =

Swedish-Iranian linguist and translator

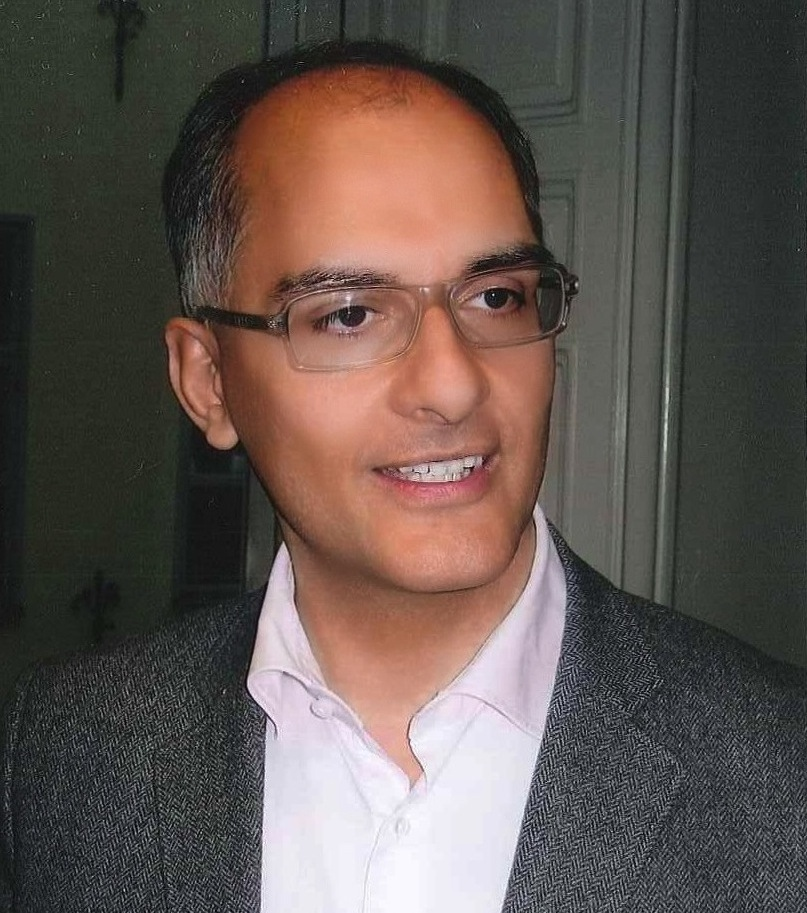
- Ashk Dahlén in 2011
- Born: Ashk Barjesteh Nia; 3 June 1972 (age 54); Tafresh, Markazi Province, Iran
- Citizenship: Swedish
- Education: Uppsala University (BA 1997, PhD 2002)
- Spouse: Mana Aghaee
- Awards: Beskow Award; Children of Abraham Award
- Scientific career
- Fields: Persian language; Persian literature; Iranian history; Iranian religions; Zoroastrianism
- Workplaces: Uppsala University; Stockholm University; University of Oslo; Royal Swedish Academy of Letters, History and Antiquities
- Doctoral advisors: Bo Utas; Jan Hjärpe

Ashk Peter Dahlén (born 3 June 1972 in Tafresh, Iran) is a Swedish scholar, linguist, Iranologist, translator, and associate professor (docent) in Persian language at Uppsala University. He is quadrilingual in Swedish, Persian, English, and French. He has published extensively in journals, and has written several books.

== Background ==
Ashk Dahlén was adopted at seven months of age by a Swedish couple after having been living at an orphanage in Narmak, north-east Tehran, Iran. His life story provided inspiration, though fictional, for the IRIB3 Television drama series The Green Journey (Persian: سفر سبز, 2002) directed by Mohammad Hossein Latifi, in which the main character, a young adoptee played by Parsa Pirouzfar, travels to Iran in search for his birth parents.

== Career ==
Ashk Dahlén currently acts as Associate Professor (docent) in Iranian languages at Uppsala University. His thesis Islamic Law, Epistemology and Modernity has been published by Routledge/Taylor & Francis. In 2003 he was recognized with the Beskow Award by The Royal Swedish Academy of Letters, History and Antiquities for the best dissertation in humanities.

Ashk Dahlén is the author of several academic studies on Persian literature, Iranian cultural history, Zoroastrianism, and Sufism. He is also translator of classical Persian literature and of Old Avestan literature. In 2001, he published his first work of translation in Swedish, Vassflöjtens sång, consisting of a selection of poetry written by the Medieval Persian poet Rumi. He has published literary translations of the Divān of Hafez, Chahār maqāla (Four Discourses) of Nizami Aruzi, and Lama'āt (Flashes) of Fakhr od-din Araqi. He has also made a Swedish translation of the Gathas of Zarathustra and of Yasna Haptanghaiti from Old Avestan, which was published in 2023.

Ashk Dahlén is a member of the Advisory Board of the Encyclopædia Iranica, the Research Collegium of the Swedish Research Institute in Istanbul, The Iranian Academy of Philosophy, and the Nathan Söderblom Society. He is the Founding President of the Scandinavian Society for Iranian Studies (2010–2016).

== Selected work in English ==
- Islamic Law, Epistemology and Modernity: Legal Philosophy in Contemporary Iran, New York, 2003.
- Transcendent Hermeneutics of Supreme Love : Rumi's Concept of Mystical "Appropriation", Orientalia Suecana, Uppsala, 2003.
- The Holy Fool in Medieval Islam: The Qalandariyat of Fakhr al-din Arāqi, Orientalia Suecana, Uppsala, 2004.
- Sirat al-mustaqim: One or Many? Religious Pluralism Among Muslim Intellectuals in Iran, The Blackwell Companion to Contemporary Islamic Thought, ed. I. Abu-Rabi, Oxford, 2006.
- The Hermeneutics of Post-modern Islam: The Case of ‘Abdol-Karim Sorush, Religious Texts in Iranian Languages, red. F. Vahman och C. V. Pedersen, The Royal Danish Academy of Sciences and Letters, Copenhagen, 2007.
- Female Sufi Saints and Disciples: Women in the life of Jalāl al-din Rumi, Orientalia Suecana, vol. 57, Uppsala, 2008.
- Sufi Islam, The World's Religions: Continuities and Transformations, ed. P. B. Clarke & Peter Beyer, New York, 2009.
- Kingship and Religion in a Mediaeval Fürstenspiegel: The Case of the Chahār Maqāla of Nizāmi Aruzi, Orientalia Suecana, vol. 58, Uppsala, 2009.
- He addressed the Kayānian king: "I am a prophet!": The Image of Zoroaster in the Dāstān-e Goshtāsp (Tale of Goshtāsp), Orientalia Suecana, Uppsala, 2012.
- Thematic Features in Iranian National History Writings: The Case of the Dāstān-e Goshtāsp (Tale of Goshtāsp), International Shāhnāme Conference. The Second Milliennium: Conference Volume, ed. F. Hashabeiky, Uppsala, 2014.
- Literary Interest in Zoroastrianism in Tenth-Century Iran: The Case of Daqiqi's Account of Goshtāsp and Zarathustra in the Shāhnāmeh, The Zoroastrian Flame: Exploring Religion, History and Tradition, ed. A. Williams, S. Stewart & A. Hintze, London, 2016.
- Living the Iranian dolce vita: Herodotus on wine drinking and luxury among the Persians, Achaemenid Anatolia: Persian Presence and Impact in the Western Satrapies 546–330 BC, ed. Ashk P. Dahlén, Uppsala, 2020.

== Textbooks (in Swedish) ==
- Modern persisk grammatik (Modern Persian Grammar), Stockholm, 3rd edition 2017 (2010, 2014; e-book 2023), 456 p.
- Persiska för nybörjare (Persian for Beginners), Stockholm, 2nd edition 2016 (2012; e-book 2023), 420 p.

== See also ==
- Iranian studies
- Persian literature
- Swedish Iranians
