= Mojdeh Bahar =

American patent attorney and government official

- مژده بهار
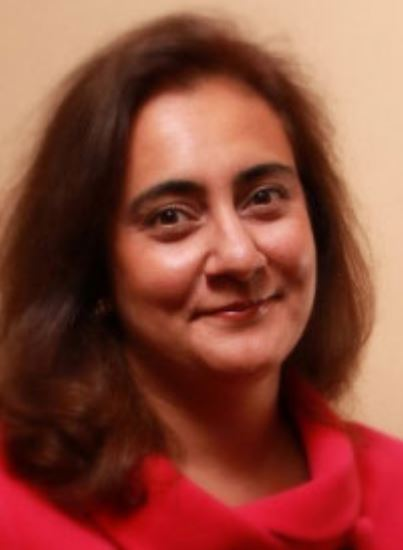
- Bahar in 2011
- Education: Dickinson College (BS); New York University (MA); University of Maryland School of Law (JD)
- Occupations: Patent attorney, former government official, non-profit executive

Mojdeh Bahar (Persian: مژده بهار) is an American patent attorney, former United States government senior executive specialized in technology transfer, and currently a non-profit executive at the Institute of Electrical and Electronics Engineers (IEEE). Previous to her current position, she was the associate director for innovation and industry services at the National Institute of Standards and Technology. Bahar had also previously worked as the assistant administrator for technology transfer at the Agricultural Research Service. She was chief of the cancer branch in the NIH Office of Technology Transfer.

== Education ==
Bahar completed a B.S. with honors in chemistry and French at Dickinson College in 1994. She earned a M.A. from New York University and a J.D. from the University of Maryland School of Law.

== Career ==
Bahar was an examiner with the United States Patent and Trademark Office (USPTO). She is a certified licensing professional, a registered technology transfer professional and a patent attorney registered to practice before the USPTO, the State of Maryland, the United States District Court for the District of Maryland, and the United States Court of Appeals for the Federal Circuit.

Bahar worked at the chief of the cancer branch at the National Institutes of Health's (NIH) Office of Technology Transfer. She led a team responsible for marketing, patenting and licensing NIH and Food and Drug Administration inventions in the areas of cancer, gene therapy and biological response modifiers. While working at the NIH, Bahar first served as the regional coordinator for the Mid-Atlantic region of the Federal Laboratory Consortium for Technology Transfer (FLC) from 2008 to 2011 and then as the national chair from 2011 to 2013.

Bahar was the assistant administrator for technology transfer at the Agricultural Research Service. She had broad responsibility for managing intellectual property and technology transfer across the United States Department of Agriculture. Bahar led the service’s external interactions with industry, academia and government dealing with intellectual property and technology transfer.

In May 2020, Bahar joined National Institute of Standards and Technology (NIST) as the associate director for innovation and industry services (ADIIS). She oversees NIST's technology transfer programs. When she joined, she reported directly to director Walter Copan.

Currently, Mojdeh serves as the Managing Director for Technical Activities at the Institute of Electrical and Electronics Engineers (IEEE).

Bahar translated poems by Iranian writer Mohammad-Reza Shafiei Kadkani into English. She published the work as Milkvetch and Violets. Mage Publishers, Inc. 2021. ISBN 978-1-949445-32-9.
