= William Grierson (footballer) =

Footballer (born 1998)

William Jay Grierson
Personal information
- Full name: William Jay Grierson
- Date of birth: 27 April 1998 (age 28)
- Place of birth: Sai Ying Pun, Hong Kong
- Height: 1.88 m (6 ft 2 in)
- Position: Defender

Team information
- Current team: Sham Shui Po
- Number: 88

Youth career
- Pegasus

Senior career*
Years	Team	Apps	(Gls)
2016–2020	Ateneo de Manila University		
2021–2023	United City	6	(0)
2024	Eastern District	11	(0)
2026–	Sham Shui Po	5	(0)

International career
2015–2016	Philippines U-19	2	(0)
2019	Philippines U-22	5	(0)
- * Club domestic league appearances and goals as of 8 July 2021

William Jay Grierson (Note: William Grieson was born in Hong Kong. Thus, he does not possess his mother's maiden name, which is Cabudol.)(Chinese: 李威廉; born 27 April 1998) is a former professional footballer who played as a defender. Born in Hong Kong, he played for the Philippines national under-22 football team.

== Early life ==
Born in Sai Ying Pun, Hong Kong to a British father and a Chinese Filipino mother, William began his footballing journey in Hong Kong with the Pegasus youth side in the local grassroots division. He soon completed his tertiary education at the Ateneo de Manila University whilst representing the youth national team of the Philippines.

== Club career ==
=== United City ===
Grierson began his career with PFL side United City, striking his first professional deal aged 23. William made his debut for the side in a 2–0 loss to J League side Kawasaki Frontale in the 2021 Asian Champions League group stage. He departed the club ahead of the 2023 PFL season.

=== Eastern District ===
In 2024, Grierson joined Eastern District, ending his 1-year football hiatus.

== Career statistics ==
=== Club ===
As of 8 July 2021

Appearances and goals by club, season and competition
Club	Season	League			Cup		Continental		Other		Total	
Club	Season	Division	Apps	Goals	Apps	Goals	Apps	Goals	Apps	Goals	Apps	Goals
United City	2021	PFL	–		0	0	2 (Note: Appearances in the AFC Champions League.)	0	0	0	2	0
Career total			0	0	0	0	2	0	0	0	2	0
