= Sean Patrick Kane =

Filipino footballer

Personal information
- Full name: Sean Patrick Kane
- Date of birth: 13 May 1991 (age 35)
- Place of birth: Pasay, Philippines
- Height: 1.80 m (5 ft 11 in)
- Positions: Midfielder; center back

Youth career
- 1998–2000: RKVVO
- 2000–2007: Lerums IS

College career
Years	Team	Apps	(Gls)
2011–2013	Foothill College		
2013–2015	Menlo College	27	(21)

Senior career*
Years	Team	Apps	(Gls)
2007–?	Lerums IS	22	(7)
2015–2016	Kaya		
2017	JPV Marikina	19	(8)
2018–2022	Ceres–Negros / United City	37	(19)

International career
2017–2022	Philippines	1	(0)
- * Club domestic league appearances and goals

Sean Patrick Kane is a Filipino former professional footballer who last played as a midfielder for Ceres–Negros F.C.

== Early life and education ==
Kane was born on 13 May 1991 to Christer and Lizmarie Nylund. in Pasay, Philippines. Kane is of Irish descent. He started playing football at age 6 when he moved to the Netherlands from the Philippines. His sister who was involved in football then taught him the fundamentals of the sport. At age 7, Kane played for RKVVO in Veldhoven, Netherlands before moving to Sweden two years later and played for the youth team of Lerums IS. He studied at the Katrinelunds Gymnasiet for his high school studies. He worked for a major in Sports Management at Menlo College.

== College career ==
Moving from Sweden, Kane played college association football or soccer in the United States to play for two seasons of the Foothill College junior team and helped the team attain 9th ranking at the NSCAA National Ranking in 2011. For two seasons from 2013 to 2015 he played for Menlo College. Despite being injured for sometime in 2014, he helped Menlo win the Cal Pac North Division title. While treating his injuries, Kane remained involved as a mentor to his younger teammates which later led to Menlo head coach Eric Bucchere to take him as his assistant in 2015.

== Club career ==
Prior to college, Kane became part of the senior team of Lerums IS at age 16 having played for the club in the youth level. After his college stint in the United States, he was signed to play for Kaya F.C. by December 2015 to play in the now-defunct United Football League.

By February 2017, Kane had joined JPV Marikina F.C. who was set to play in the inaugural season of the Philippines Football League. He played multiple positions with JPV. Initially he mostly played as a midfielder for the club but transitioned into more defensive roles as the 2017 season progressed.

== International career ==
Sean Patrick Kane attempted to get into the Philippine national team as early as 2011. He joined a tryout for the national team conducted in California in the United States by Aly Borromeo and Anton del Rosario who scouting for recruits who are aged 15 to 24 years old. He was not selected.

Kane had his first call up to the Philippine national team for a 2019 AFC Asian Cup qualifier match against Yemen scheduled on 10 October 2017 in Doha, Qatar. He made his first international cap as a central defender for the Philippine national team when he was named among the starting eleven of the match.

Kane announced his retirement for professional football on March 6, 2022, on his social media pages.
