= Andreas Esswein =

Filipino footballer

Personal information
- Full name: Andreas Campollo Esswein
- Date of birth: 26 January 1997 (age 29)
- Place of birth: Bruchsal, Germany
- Height: 1.75 m (5 ft 9 in)
- Position: Midfielder

Youth career
- 2002-2010: FC Karlsdorf
- 2010–2014: FC Astoria Walldorf

Senior career*
Years	Team	Apps	(Gls)
2014–2015	Waldhof Mannheim	17	(0)
2015–2016	FC Spöck	7	(0)
2016	Global	20	(1)
2017	Davao Aguilas	11	(0)
2018–2019	FC 07 Heidelsheim	10	(0)
2020	Global Makati	0	(0)
2021–2022	United City	0	(0)
2023	Kelantan	0	(0)
2023	PSIM Yogyakarta	1	(0)

International career
2017	Philippines U22	2	(0)
- * Club domestic league appearances and goals as of 11 September 2023

Andreas Campollo Esswein (born 26 January 1997) is a professional footballer who plays as a midfielder. Born in Germany, he is a youth international for the Philippines.

== Career ==
Born in Bruchsal, Germany to a Filipino mother and a German father, Esswein left the Waldhof Mannheim youth team, who competed in the U19 Bundesliga in 2015 for Spöck in the sixth division after a transfer to another U19 Bundesliga team never materialized.

After playing for Spöck, which he saw as a short-term way to play regularly, Esswein signed for Global in the Philippines through fellow Filipino-German player Stephan Schröck.

In 2017, Esswein played for Davao Aguilas in the professional Philippines Football League, where he made only eleven league appearances due to dengue fever and scored zero goals. After signing for Davao Aguilas he got a call-up for the Philippine U23 national team for an international friendly match against Bahrain in Manama where he made his debut on international level.

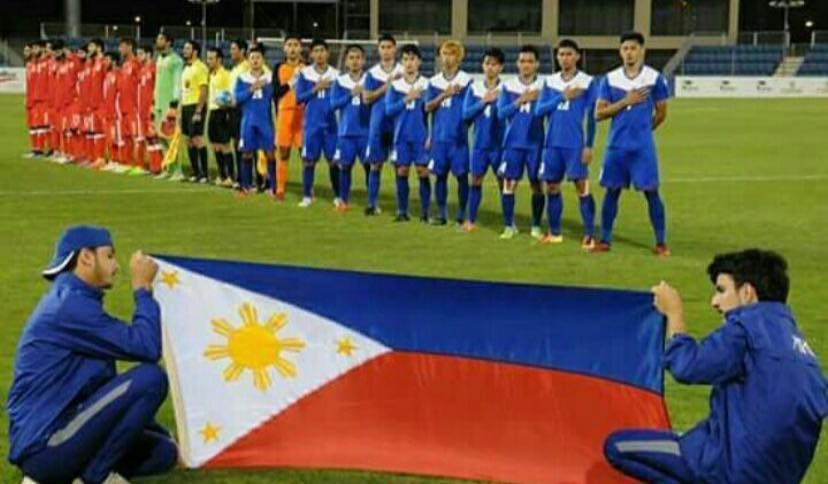
Esswein making his debut with the Philippine U22 national team against Bahrain in Manama, Bahrain.

Around December 2017, Esswein received an offer from Thailand to play in their Thai League but due to failed terms and negotiations of the contract during the transfer window Esswein ended up being free agent.

=== Waldhof Mannheim ===
After his stint at FC Astoria Walldorf, Esswein transferred to Waldhof Mannheim in 2014. Joining Waldhof Mannheim gave him the opportunity to compete in the U19 Bundesliga which is the highest possible level in youth football.

=== Global ===
In 2016, Global announced the signing of Andreas Esswein.

After winning the UFL League and Cup, Esswein also made his appearance in the Singapore Cup at the Jalan Besar Stadium in Singapore against Cambodian side Nagaworld.

During the season 2016–17, Global became financially unstable which made Esswein decide to transfer to Davao Aguilas.

=== Davao Aguilas ===
In March 2017, Esswein and Davao Aguilas announced the mutual agreement of the player and the club. Esswein was the first ever foreign born Filipino that signed for the club. After their training camp in Malaysia where they competed against Malaysian Super League teams and their training camp in Singapore, Esswein got infected by the dengue fever and had to miss out a couple of PFL League Games.

=== Return to Global ===
Return to Global in January 2020, Esswein and the club announced the succeeded signing in the year of 2020, but the COVID-19 pandemic put the Philippines Football League on hold and the management of Global failed to pay its wages to its staff and players which led to a FIFA ban which again made Esswein a free agent player.

=== United City ===
In March 2021, United City Football Club officially announced the signing of Andreas Esswein. Esswein will compete in the Philippines Football League once again and also in the AFC Champions League.

== Early life ==
Esswein was born on 26 January 1997 in Bruchsal, Germany to a German father and a Filipino mother. His mother is from Daet, Camarines Norte. Esswein also has an older brother Kevin Esswein who is eligible to play for the Philippine Nationalteam. Kevin Esswein played for Karlsruher SC and later TSG 1899 Hoffenheim. Another Filipino-German relative of him, Cameron Royo which is his cousin, was signed by 2.Bundesliga club SV Darmstadt 98.

== Honours ==
SV Waldhof Mannheim

- U19 Bundesliga: 2014–15

Global

- Groupe Stage for AFC Cup 2017
- Qualified for AFC Champions League play-offs
- United Football League Cup winner: 2016
