= Scandinavian Society for Iranian Studies =

The Scandinavian Society for Iranian Studies (Persian: انجمنِ ایران‌شناسیِ اسکاندیناوی) is a Scandinavian association of scholars working in the field of Iranian studies with members not only from Scandinavian countries, but also from the Baltic States and Finland. The goal of the Society is to enforce, develop and support Iranian studies in all subject areas of this field, in particular philology and linguistics.

== History ==
The Society was founded in Oslo in 2010 on the initiative of the Founding President Ashk Dahlén.

== Programs ==
The Society arranges academic events in the Scandinavian countries on a regular basis for the purpose of promoting the interdisciplinary study of Iranian civilization and knowledge of Iran and the Persian-speaking world from the earliest periods to the present. The 1st Triennial Iranian Studies Conference was held in Oslo on 30 March 2012.
