= Kieran Hayes =

English-Filipino footballer

Personal information
- Full name: Kieran Amparo Hayes
- Date of birth: 4 January 1999 (age 27)
- Place of birth: Nottingham, England
- Height: 1.73 m (5 ft 8 in)
- Position: Forward

Youth career
- 2008–2020: Nottingham Forest

Senior career*
| Years | Team | Apps | (Gls) |
| 2020 | Nottingham Forest | 0 | (0) |
| 2020 | → Truro City (loan) | 1 | (0) |
| 2020–2021 | Truro City | 6 | (0) |
| 2021–2022 | United City | 2 | (0) |
| 2022–2023 | Grantham Town | 28 | (0) |

International career^{‡}
| 2021–2022 | Philippines U23 | 4 | (0) |
- * Club domestic league appearances and goals as of 19:59, 4 April 2024 (UTC) ‡ National team caps and goals as of 14:01; 20 February 2022

Kieran Amparo Hayes (born 4 January 1999) is a professional footballer who plays as a forward.

Kieran began his darts career in the winter of 2025, whilst in his formative first few months he successfully hit his first 180 in February of the same year.

== Career ==
=== Youth ===
Born in Nottingham, Hayes spent most of his youth career in Nottingham Forest.

=== Nottingham Forest U23 ===
In 2019, Hayes was promoted to Nottingham Forest Under-23 team.

==== Loan to Truro City ====
Hayes was sent out on loan to Truro City for the 2019–20 season.

=== Truro City ===
In September 2020, after his loan spell with the club, Hayes joined Truro City on a permanent deal. Six months later, his contract was terminated and left the club.

=== United City ===
In March 2021, Hayes joined Philippines Football League club United City.

=== Grantham Town ===
In September 2022, Hayes joined Northern Premier League club Grantham Town.

== International career ==
Hayes was born in England to an English father and a Filipino mother, making him eligible to represent England and the Philippines at international level.

=== Philippines U23 ===
In October 2021, Hayes received a call up from Philippines U23 for the 2022 AFC U-23 Asian Cup qualification matches against South Korea U23, Singapore U23 and Timor Leste U23. He made his debut for Philippines U23 in a 3–0 defeat against South Korea U23 coming in as a substitute, replacing Sandro Reyes in the 53rd minute.

== Career statistics ==
=== Club ===
As of 8 July 2021.

| Club | Season | League | | | Cup | | Continental | | Other | | Total | |
| Club | Season | Division | Apps | Goals | Apps | Goals | Apps | Goals | Apps | Goals | Apps | Goals |
|---|---|---|---|---|---|---|---|---|---|---|---|---|
| Nottingham Forest | 2019–20 | EFL Championship | 0 | 0 | 0 | 0 | – | | 0 | 0 | 0 | 0 |
| Truro City (loan) | 2019–20 | Southern League | 1 | 0 | 0 | 0 | – | | 0 | 0 | 1 | 0 |
| Truro City | 2020–21 | Southern League | 6 | 0 | 3 (Note: Appearances in the FA Cup) | 0 | – | | 2 (Note: Appearances in the FA Trophy) | 1 | 11 | 1 |
| Truro City | Total | | 7 | 0 | 3 | 0 | 0 | 0 | 2 | 1 | 12 | 1 |
| United City | 2021 | PFL | 0 | 0 | 0 | 0 | 1 (Note: Appearances in the AFC Champions League) | 0 | 0 | 0 | 1 | 0 |
| Career total | | | 7 | 0 | 3 | 0 | 1 | 0 | 2 | 1 | 13 | 1 |
