= Anthony Pinthus =

Filipino footballer (born 1998)

Personal information
- Full name: Anthony Abadies Pinthus
- Date of birth: 4 April 1998 (age 28)
- Place of birth: Solothurn, Switzerland
- Height: 1.82 m (6 ft 0 in)
- Position: Goalkeeper

Team information
- Current team: Tuggen
- Number: 1

Youth career
- 2013–2018: Grasshoppers

Senior career*
Years	Team	Apps	(Gls)
2018–2019	Grasshoppers	0	(0)
2018	→ United Zürich (loan)	7	(0)
2019	→ Wohlen (loan)	1	(0)
2019–2020	Kosova Zürich	1	(0)
2020	Azkals Development Team	0	(0)
2020	→ United City (loan)	4	(0)
2021–2023	United City	11	(0)
2023–2024	PSS Sleman	25	(0)
2025–	Tuggen	0	(0)
Total		49	(0)

International career
2019	Philippines U23	4	(0)
2022–2023	Philippines	3	(0)
- * Club domestic league appearances and goals

Anthony Abadies Pinthus (born 4 April 1998) is a professional footballer who plays as a goalkeeper for 1. Liga Classic club FC Tuggen. Born in Switzerland, he represented the Philippines at international level.

== Club career ==
Born and raised in Switzerland, he began his football career at Grasshopper Club Zürich, where he played for the club's youth teams. He was loaned out to 1. Liga clubs United Zürich and Wohlen before ending his contract with Grasshoppers.

In early 2020, Pinthus joined the Azkals Development Team (ADT) of the Philippines Football League (PFL) and was eventually loaned out in August to fellow PFL club United City. He made his PFL debut on 28 October, keeping a clean sheet for United City as they defeated his parent club ADT, 1–0. He was awarded the PFL Golden Glove for keeping three clean sheets and conceding only one goal in the whole 2020 season.

On 16 January 2021, United City announced that they had signed in Pinthus on a permanent basis owing to his performance while on loan with the club.

== International career ==
Pinthus is eligible to play for the Philippines, Switzerland, and the Republic of Ireland.

=== Philippines U23 ===
Pinthus played as the starting goalkeeper of the Philippine U-23 that competed in the Southeast Asian Games held in the Philippines.

=== Philippines ===
He made his debut for the Philippines in a 4–1 friendly win against Timor Leste in Bali, Indonesia.

== Personal life ==
Pinthus was born in Solothurn, Switzerland to a Filipina mother who hails from Cagayan de Oro, and a Swiss father who is half Swiss and half Irish. He started playing football at a young age, taught by his father. Growing up, his football idol was Real Madrid and Spain goalkeeper Iker Casillas.

== Honours ==
United City

- Philippines Football League: 2020
- Copa Paulino Alcantara: 2022

Individual

- Philippines Football League Golden Glove: 2020
- Copa Paulino Alcantara Golden Glove: 2022
