= Jan Hjärpe =

Jan Östen Hjärpe (13 July 1942) is a Swedish Islamicist and a professor emeritus in Islamic studies at the Centre for Theology and Religious Studies at Lund University.

Hjärpe was born in Gothenburg, Sweden. He earned a B.D. from Uppsala University ín 1965 and a B.A. in the history of religions and Semitic languages in 1967. From 1967 to 1968 he studied at University of Strasbourg. He studied for a Licentiate of Theology at Uppsala University in 1971 and defended his thesis in the history of religions in 1972. From 1972 to 1976 he was a senior lecturer in the history of religions at Uppsala University and Umeå University. He also served as an acting professor at Åbo Akademi University in 1976, and an acting senior lecturer in the history of religions and the psychology of religions at Lund University from 1976 to 1982. From 1982 to 1984 he was a researcher in Islamic studies at the Swedish Research Council for Humanities and Social Sciences (now a part of the Swedish Research Council). From 1983 to 1984 he also served as a counsellor at the Swedish Ministry for Foreign Affairs. He has held the professorship in Islamic studies at Lund University (which is the only professorship in Islamic studies in Sweden) since 1984. He is a member of the Royal Swedish Academy of Letters, History and Antiquities and the Academia Europæa.
