= Mana Aghaee =

Iranian poet

- Born: مانا آقایی; 24 August 1973 (age 53); Bushehr, Iran
- Education: Uppsala University
- Occupations: Poet writer
- Spouse: Ashk Dahlén
- Relatives: Shirzad Aghaee (father)
- Writing career
- Language: Persian, Swedish
- Period: 1991–present
- Genres: Poetry; Haiku; Bibliography; Iranian Studies
- Notable works: Marg agar labhā-ye to rā dāsht (2003); Man 'Isā ebn-e khodam (2007); Zemestān ma'shuq-e man ast (2012)
- Website: iranianpoetry.com

Mana Aghaee (Persian: مانا آقایی; born August 24, 1973 in Bushehr, Iran) is an Iranian-Swedish poet, translator, podcast producer, and scholar of Iranian studies.

== Background ==
Mana Aghaee was born 24 August 1973 into a middle-class family in Bushehr, Iran. She is the daughter of the Iranian literary scholar and poet Shirzad Aghaee of Shiraz.

In 1987 her family emigrated to Sweden, and settled in Stockholm. She is married to Ashk Dahlén, Swedish scholar and translator of Persian literature, since 1994.

== Career ==
Mana Aghaee has a M.A. degree in Iranian languages from Uppsala University, Sweden, and is a specialist in modern Persian literature.

She regularly contributes to Persian literary journals and magazines inside and outside of Iran. Her poems have also been translated into several languages, among them, English, Swedish, Turkish, Arabic, Sorani and German.

Mana Aghaee is a pioneer writer in Persian of short form poetry, Haiku and Tanka, originally from Japan. She has also contributed to introducing Swedish as well as Persian poetry, especially poetry from Japan and Korea, in Persian.

She was the founder and co-producer of Sherophone, the first biweekly podcast of Persian poetry in 2010.

== Reception ==
Mana Aghaee has been described as being "among the most prolific and accomplished poets of the Iranian diaspora." Her poems has been well received in Iran and are regularly published in literary magazines and websites, and broadcast on radio. Among female poets her name stands out together with a few others: "Among other modern Iranian poetesses the names of Parvin Etesami, Forugh Farrokhzad, Simin Behbahani, Mana Aghaee, and Ziba Karbasi, among others, stand out."

== Published works ==
Collections of poetry

- Dar emtedād-i parvāz, Vällingby, 1991.
- Marg agar labhā-ye torā dāsht, Bushehr, 2003.
- Man 'Isā ebn-e khodam, Stockholm, 2007.
- Zemestān mashugh-e man ast, Stockholm, 2012.

Aghaee's work can be found in the following anthologies in English:

- Rattapallax – Endangered Languages & Poetry, ed. Catherine Feltcher, No 13, New York: Rattapallax Press, 2006.
- Belonging: New Poetry by Iranians around the World, ed. Niloufar Talebi, Berkeley: North Atlantic Books, 2008.
- The Poetry of Iranian Women: A Contemporary Anthology, ed. Sheema Kalbasi, Scotts Valley: Reel Content, 2009.
- Private - International Review of Photographs and Texts, No 42, Saint-Brisson: Oriano Sportelli Publisher, Autumn 2008.
- Eminent Poetesses of Persian, ed. S.R.M. Chopra, Kolkata: Iran Society, 2010.
- The Mirror of My Heart: A Thousand Years of Persian Poetry By Women, ed. Dick Davis, Washington D.C.: Mage Publishers, 2020.
- Song of the Ground Jay: Poems by Iranian Women, 1960–2022, ed. Mojdeh Bahar, Washington D.C.: Mage Publishers, 2023.

Literary Translations

- Havāpeymā-i be ārāmi-ye sanjāqak (contemporary East Asian poetry), Iran, 2014. (Persian)
- Docharkhe-ye bāldār (150 Swedish haiku), Iran, 2018. (Persian)

Bibliographical Works

- Lexikon över iranska författare i Sverige (A Bibliography of Iranian Writers in Sweden), Uppsala, 2002. (Swedish)
- Ketabshenāsi-ye she'r-e zanān-e irān (A Bibliography of Iranian Women Poets), Stockholm, 2007. (Persian)

Academic Articles

- "Den persiska litteraturen i Sverige (Persian Literature in Sweden)", Litteraturens gränsland. Invandrar- och minoritetslitteratur i nordiskt perspektiv, ed. S. Gröndahl, Uppsala: Uppsala University Press, 2002. (Swedish)
- "Inledning", Mosaikens turkosa eko: persisk modern poesi (Introduction to Modern Persian Poetry), Stockholm, 2002. (Swedish)

== See also ==
- List of Iranian women
