= Mohammad Fazlhashemi =

Seyyed Mohammad Fazlhashemi
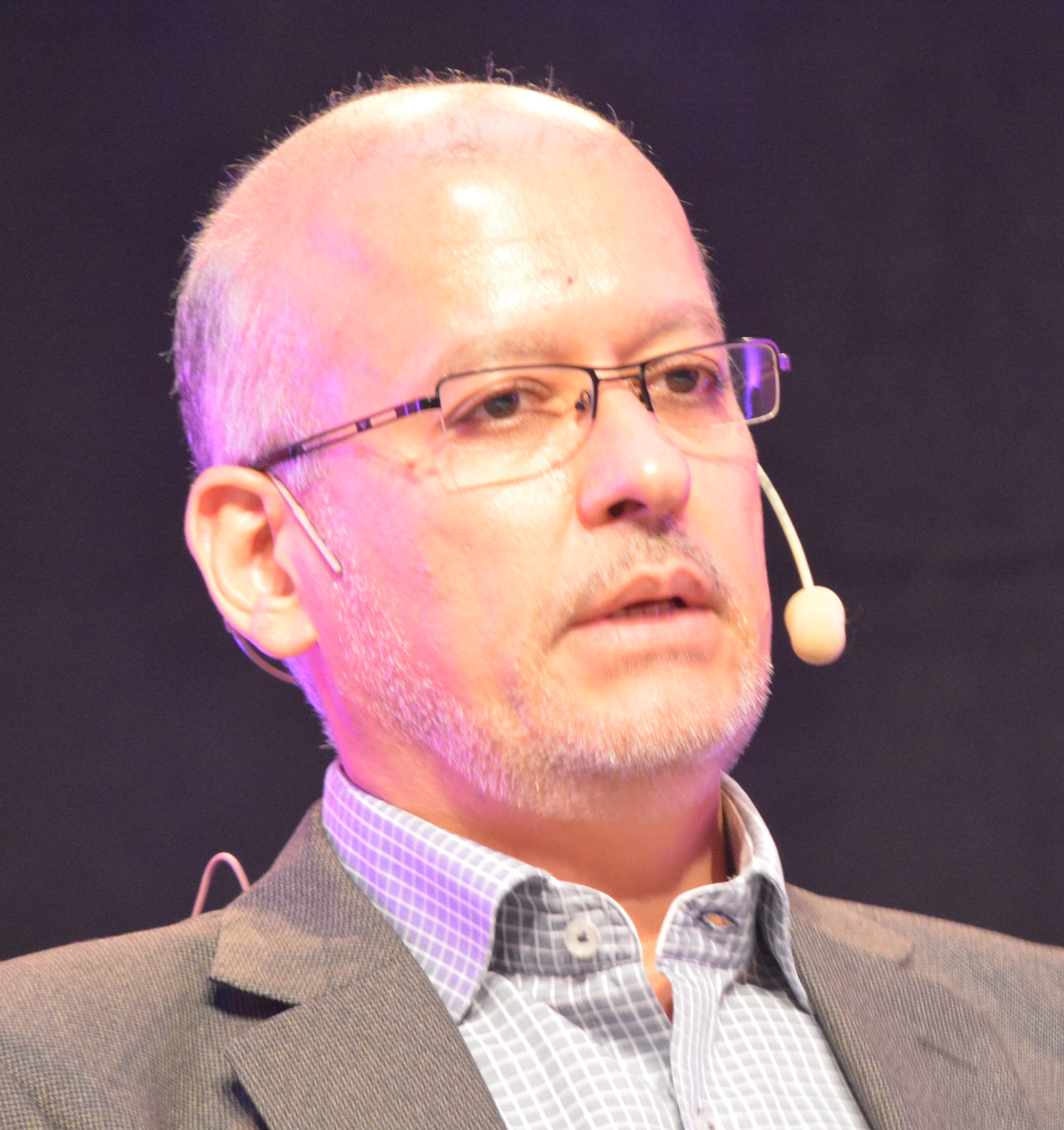
- Born: Tehran, Iran
- Occupations: Professor of Islamic Theology and Philosophy

Seyyed Mohammad Fazlhashemi (Persian: سید محمد فضل هاشمی) was born in Tehran in 1961. He has been living in Sweden since 1977. He is a professor of Islamic Theology and Philosophy at Uppsala University, Sweden.

== Publications ==
- Förändring och kontinuitet, Al-Ghazâlîs politiska omsvängning, Umeå, 1994.
- "Muslimsk exil och den europeiska medborgarskapsdiskursen, iranska intellektuella i London och Paris 1850-1908", Medborgarskap, Reflektioner kring ett problematiskt europeiskt begrepp, ed. Fazlhashemi, Mohammad & Fruitman, Stephen, Stockholm, 1997.
- "Turkey: Iran's Window on Europe", Boundaries of Europe?, FRN rapport nr 98:6, Stockholm, 1998.
- Exemplets makt, Föreställningar om Europa/Väst i Iran 1850-1980, Stockholm, 1999.
- Vidgade vyer, Globalt perspektiv på idéhistoria, ed. Fazlhashemi, Öckerman & Ambjörnsson, Lund, 2000.
- Occidentalism: idéer om väst och modernitet bland muslimska tänkare, Lund, 2005.
- Vems islam. De kontrastrika muslimerna, Stockholm, 2008, 2009, 2012.
- Omodernt : människor och tankar i förmodern tid / (ed.) Mohammad Fazlhashemi & Eva Österberg, Lund, 2009.
- Tro eller förnuft i politisk islam, Stockholm, 2011.
- "Den arabiska våren. Folkets uppror i Mellanöstern och Nordafrika", Lund, 2013, 2014.
- "Vems islam. De kontrastrika muslimerna", Lund, 2014.
- "Islams dynamiska mellantid. Muslimsk idéhistoria mellan guldåldern och framväxten av politisk islam", Stockholm 2016.
- "Visdomens hus. Muslimska idévärldar 600 – 2000", Stockholm 2017. (In cooperation with Professor Ronny Ambjörnsson)
- "The Parallel Power System as an Alternative to Revolution and Passivity"", Future(s) of the Revolution and the Reformation / [ed] Elena Namli, Switzerland: Palgrave Macmillan, 2019.
- Systematiska studier av kristen och muslimsk tro - en introduktion, [eds.] Mohammad Fazlhashemi & Mattias Martinson, Malmö 2021.
- "Internal Critique in Muslim Context", A Constructive Critique of Religion: Encounterns between Christianity, Islam, and non-religion in Secular Societies / [ed] Mia Lövheim & Mikael Stenmark, London: Bloomsbury Academic, 2020.
- "A Book for Children, Manual in Court Intrigues or Advice for Ethical Government: Appelboom’s Swedish Translation of Kalila and Dimna", Turcologica Upsaliensia: An Illustrated Collection of Essays / [ed] Éva Á. Csató, Gunilla Gren-Eklund, Lars Johanson, Birsel Karakoç, Leiden: Brill Academic Publishers, 2020.
- "Imāmiyya Shīʿa (The Twelvers)", Handbook of Islamic Sects and Movements / [ed] Muhammad Afzal Upal & Carole M. Cusack, Leiden Boston: Brill Academic Publishers, 2021.
- Shiʿite Salafism?, Palgrave Series in Islamic Theology, Law, and History. Palgrave Macmillan, 2022.
- Iran mellan tre revolutioner - Förebilder och motbilder, Historiska media, 2024.
