= NIH Office of Technology Transfer =

The NIH Office of Technology Transfer is an office of the National Institutes of Health (NIH) a United States federal government agency responsible for biomedical and public health research. The NIH Office of Technology transfer manages all intramural inventions from the NIH and CDC as mandated by the Federal Technology Transfer Act and related legislation. It was established in 1986 subsequent to the Federal Technology Transfer Act as a centralized group to oversee patent and license matters for all of the NIH Institutes and Centers. The office allows both agencies to better license their work for international use.

OTT staff provide management and oversight of the collection and disbursement of royalties, monitor and enforce patent rights and licensing agreements, coordinate the payment of all patent annuities, market available technologies to the private sector, provide legal docketing services, and provide technology development systems support and expertise to the NIH Technology Transfer community.

Technology transfer at the NIH is a process which transfers medical knowledge from NIH laboratories to other organizations for the purpose of developing that knowledge into medical products to enhance the public health. In the course of their research, NIH scientists often make important medical discoveries. These NIH scientists disclose their discoveries to NIH technology transfer specialists who decide if patenting is appropriate, and when a patent is sought, begin to seek appropriate development and commercialization partners and licensees. Inventions developed in the NIH's laboratories are owned by the NIH and are patented as appropriate. Through such resources as Federal Register notices and the NIH's website, potential licensees and collaborators are made aware of NIH inventions, and discussions begin between them and the NIH technology transfer specialist. These discussions then develop into agreement negotiations, with the ultimate goal being a license or other collaboration agreement to develop NIH inventions further into medical products.

Patent prosecution decisions and the negotiation and execution of new licenses, are the responsibility of the individual institutes within the NIH.
