= Amin Nazari =

Filipino footballer (born 1993)

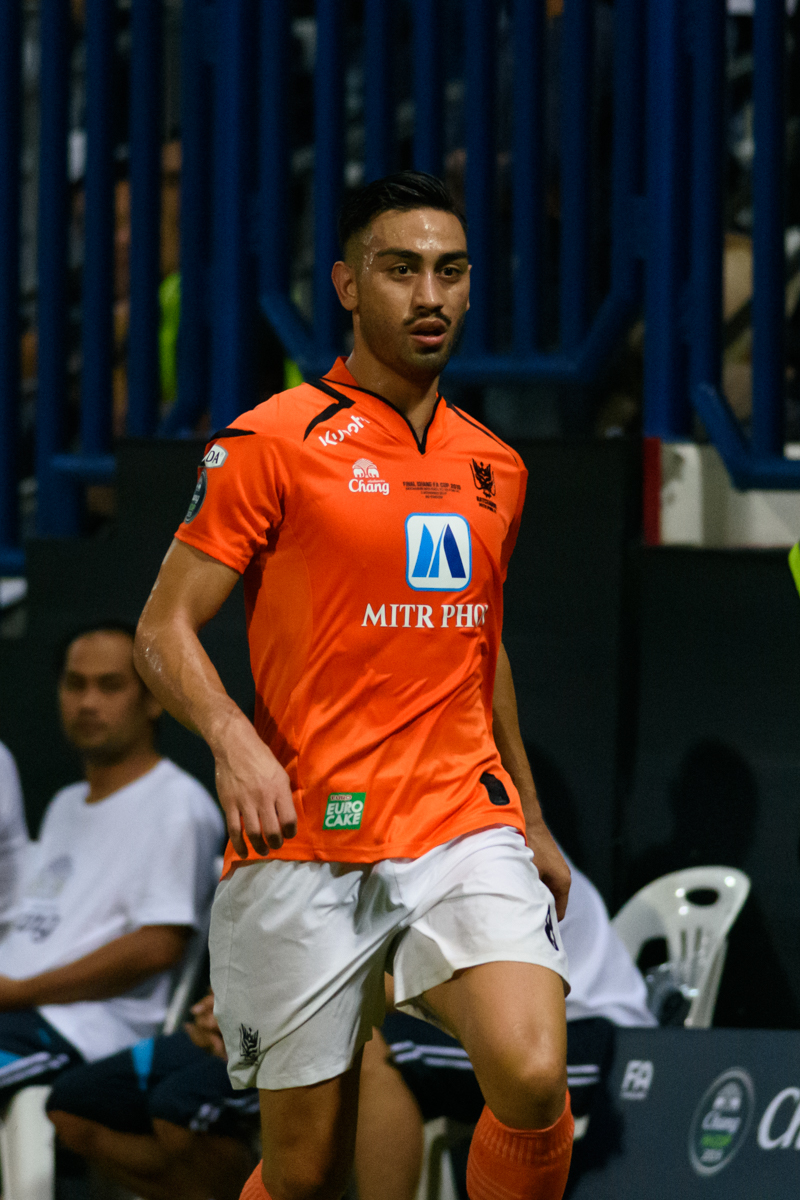
- Nazari playing for Ratchaburi Mitr Phol in 2019

Personal information
- Full name: Amin Adam Lazarte Nazari
- Date of birth: 26 April 1993 (age 33)
- Place of birth: Malmö, Sweden
- Height: 1.81 m (5 ft 11 in)
- Position: Midfielder

Youth career
- 1998–2011: Malmö FF

Senior career*
Years	Team	Apps	(Gls)
2011–2015	Malmö FF	18	(0)
2013	→ Assyriska FF (loan)	23	(4)
2015	→ Fredrikstad (loan)	26	(3)
2016–2017	Falkenbergs FF	39	(3)
2018	IFK Mariehamn	24	(3)
2019	Ratchaburi Mitr Phol	27	(1)
2020	Kedah	8	(0)
2021	United City	0	(0)
2022	PT Prachuap	4	(0)

International career^{‡}
2009	Sweden U17	12	(3)
2011–2012	Sweden U19	8	(3)
2013	Sweden U21	1	(0)
2018–2021	Philippines	6	(2)
- * Club domestic league appearances and goals as of 4 May 2022 ‡ National team caps and goals as of 12:30, 20 December 2021 (UTC)

Amin Nazari (Persian: امین نظری; born 26 April 1993) is a professional footballer who plays as a midfielder. Born in Sweden, he has represented the Philippines national team.

His brother Omid is also a footballer who used to play for Malmö FF.

== Club career ==
=== Malmö FF ===
Nazari began playing football at Malmö FF at the age of five. He made his way up to the first team and made his Allsvenskan debut in a match against Mjällby AIF on 20 April 2011. Nazari signed a 2 1/2-year first team contract on 4 May 2011, keeping him at the club until the end of the 2013 season. He made his UEFA debut on 26 July 2011 in the 2011–12 UEFA Champions League third qualifying round against Rangers F.C. Nazari saw much more limited play during the 2012 season due to high competition in the central midfield. He only played one match during the season, a goalless home draw against BK Häcken. Back in Malmö FF during the 2014 season, Nazari made sporadic substitution appearances, adding up to a total of ten matches during the league season.

=== Loan spells ===
On 29 March 2013 it was announced that Nazari was to be on loan at Superettan club Assyriska FF until the end of the 2013 season. At the same time he extended his contract with Malmö FF until the end of the 2015 season. Nazari played 23 matches and scored four goals for Assyriska during his loan spell at the club. After having made sporadic appearances for Malmö FF during the 2014 season Nazari went on loan to Norwegian side Fredrikstad for the duration of the 2015 season.

=== Falkenbergs FF ===
On 7 January 2016 it was confirmed that Nazari had signed a contract with Falkenbergs FF in the Allsvenskan. Nazari scored his first goal for Falkenbergs on 21 February 2016 in the 2015–16 Svenska Cupen. He left the club at the end of 2017.

=== IFK Mariehamn ===
Nazari joined Veikkausliiga side IFK Mariehamn in May 2018.

=== Ratchaburi ===
After beginning his playing career with the Philippines, Nazari joined Thai League 1 side Ratchaburi Mitr Phol in February 2019.

=== Kedah ===
On 14 December 2019, Amin Nazari agreed to join Malaysia Super League side Kedah.

== International career ==
Nazari was born in Sweden, his parents are from Iran and the Philippines. He is therefore eligible to play for Sweden, Iran or the Philippines. Nazari has stated that playing for Sweden would be the most logical choice should the opportunity arise in the future. His older brother Omid Nazari played for the Iranian national team and now he represents to the Philippines.

=== Sweden ===
In 2009, he played for Sweden's under-17 team during the 2010 UEFA European Under-17 Championship qualifying round, playing in all three matches and scoring one goal.

=== Switch to Philippines ===
In September 2018, it was announced that Nazari received a call-up from the Philippines.

On 6 September 2018, Nazari made his debut for the Philippines in a 1–1 draw against Bahrain. He was a starter during that match and was replaced by Adam Reed in the 73rd minute.

In November 2021, Nazari was called up to the Azkals for the AFF Championship. He scored his first international goal for the Philippines in their opening game of the tournament on 8 December 2021 against Singapore.

== Outside football ==
=== Sponsorship ===
Amin Nazari has been outfitted by German sportswear manufacturer Puma.

== Career statistics ==
=== Club ===
Updated 6 November 2020.

Club	Division	Season	League		Cup		League Cup		Continental		Total	
Club	Division	Season	Apps	Goals	Apps	Goals	Apps	Goals	Apps	Goals	Apps	Goals
Malmö FF	Allsvenskan	2011	7	0	3	1	—		1	0	11	1
Malmö FF	Allsvenskan	2012	1	0	0	0	—		—		1	0
Malmö FF	Total		8	0	3	1	0	0	1	0	12	1
Assyriska FF	Superettan	2013	23	4	1	0	—		—		24	4
Malmö FF	Allsvenskan	2014	10	0	1	0	—		3	0	14	0
Fredrikstad	OBOS-ligaen	2015	26	3	2	4	—		—		28	7
Falkenberg	Allsvenskan	2016	23	2	3	1	—		—		26	3
Falkenberg	Superettan	2017	16	1	1	0	—		—		17	1
Falkenberg	Total		39	3	4	1	0	0	0	0	43	4
Mariehamn	Veikkausliiga	2018	24	3	0	0	—		—		24	3
Ratchaburi Mitr Phol F.C.	Thai League 1	2019	27	0	0	0	—		—		27	0
Kedah FA	Malaysia Super League	2020	8	0	0	0	1	0	2	0	11	0
Career total			165	13	11	6	1	0	6	0	183	19

=== International goals ===
Scores and results list the Philippines' goal tally first.

#	Date	Venue	Opponent	Score	Result	Competition
1.	8 December 2021	National Stadium, Kallang, Singapore	Singapore	1–2	1–2	2020 AFF Championship
2.	11 December 2021	National Stadium, Kallang, Singapore	Timor-Leste	2–0	7–0	2020 AFF Championship

== Honours ==
Malmö

- Allsvenskan: 2014
