= Lerums IS =

Swedish football club

- Full name: Lerums Idrottssällskap
- Nickname: LIS
- Founded: 1927
- Ground: Aspevallen; Rydsberg konstgräs Lerum; Sweden
- League: Division 3 Mellersta Götaland
- 2009: Division 3 Nordvästra Götaland, 2nd
Home colours	Away colours

Lerums IS is a Swedish football club located in Lerum in Lerum Municipality, Västra Götaland County.

== Background ==
Lerum IS is a sports club that was formed in 1927 and specialises in football. LIS run a ladies team and a large and relatively successful youth section, the latter of which has over 1000 members and is one of the biggest clubs in the Gothenburg area.

Since their foundation, Lerums IS has participated mainly in the middle and lower divisions of the Swedish football league system. The club currently plays in Division 3 Mellersta Götaland, which is the fifth tier of Swedish football. They play their home matches at the Aspevallen in Lerum.

Lerums IS are affiliated to the Göteborgs Fotbollförbund.

== Season to season ==
Season	Level	Division	Section	Position	Movements
1993	Tier 4	Division 3	Nordvästra Götaland	7th	
1994	Tier 4	Division 3	Mellersta Götaland	8th	
1995	Tier 4	Division 3	Sydvästra Götaland	12th	Relegated
1996	Tier 5	Division 4	Göteborg A	3rd	
1997	Tier 5	Division 4	Göteborg A	2nd	Promotion Playoffs
1998	Tier 5	Division 4	Göteborg A	2nd	Promotion Playoffs
1999	Tier 5	Division 4	Göteborg A	5th	
2000	Tier 5	Division 4	Göteborg A	2nd	Promotion Playoffs – Promoted
2001	Tier 4	Division 3	Nordvästra Götaland	6th	
2002	Tier 4	Division 3	Mellersta Götaland	9th	Relegation Playoffs – Relegated
2003	Tier 5	Division 4	Göteborg B	10th	
2004	Tier 5	Division 4	Göteborg B	10th	
2005	Tier 5	Division 4	Göteborg B	8th	
2006*	Tier 6	Division 4	Göteborg B	4th	
2007	Tier 6	Division 4	Göteborg B	3rd	
2008	Tier 6	Division 4	Göteborg A	1st	Promoted
2009	Tier 5	Division 3	Nordvästra Götaland	2nd	Promotion Playoffs
2010	Tier 5	Division 3	Mellersta Götaland	6th	
2011	Tier 5	Division 3	Mellersta Götaland	2nd	Promotion Playoffs

* League restructuring in 2006 resulted in a new division being created at Tier 3 and subsequent divisions dropping a level.

== Attendances ==
In recent seasons Lerums IS have had the following average attendances:

Season	Average attendance	Division / Section	Level
2008	Not available	Div 4 Göteborg A	Tier 6
2009	120	Div 3 Nordvästra Götaland	Tier 5
2010	104	Div 3 Mellersta Götaland	Tier 5

* Attendances are provided in the Publikliga sections of the Svenska Fotbollförbundet website.
