= United City F.C. =

Association football club in the Philippines

United City
- Full name: United City Football Club
- Nickname: The Golden Boys
- Short name: UCFC
- Founded: 2012; 14 years ago (as Ceres–La Salle); 2020; 6 years ago (as United City)
- Ground: New Clark City Athletics Stadium
- Capacity: 20,000
- Owner: United City Football Company Inc.
- President: Eric Gottschalk
- Head coach: Ramon Tribulietx
- League: Philippines Football League
- 2024: Philippines Football League, 6th of 15
- Website: unitedcityfootballclub.com
Home colours	Away colours

United City Football Club is a Philippines professional football club that last competed in the Philippines Football League, the top-tier league of football in the Philippines.

From 2012 to 2020, the club was known as Ceres (founded as Ceres–La Salle; renamed Ceres–Negros in 2017, when it joined the PFL) and was associated with Ceres Liner, a bus company owned by Leo Rey Yanson, the club owner and chairman during that period. As Ceres, its home venue was Panaad Stadium in Bacolod, Negros Occidental.

As Ceres–La Salle, their first major success in the United Football League (UFL) was winning the UFL Division 2 title in 2014, earning them promotion to the first division. Since then, they have won the UFL FA League Cup (2014) and the UFL Division 1 title (2015). The club also won the PFF National Men's Club Championship twice (2012–13 and 2013–14). As Ceres–Negros, they won the PFL title in three consecutive seasons: 2017 through 2019, as well as the 2019 Copa Paulino Alcantara. In 2019, they completed the domestic double without a single loss. In 2021, The club made their debut in the AFC Champions League.

Due to the COVID-19 pandemic which affected Ceres Liner operations, Yanson was forced to sell the club through the help of Emirati-Philippine sports marketing firm MMC Sportz Asia. MMC negotiated the deal on behalf of the new owners who registered the entity as United City Football Company Inc., retained most of the Ceres players and renamed the club to United City.

In February 2023, United City was forced to withdraw from the PFL over financial and legal issues caused by the default of payments by its Singapore investor, Riau Capital Live.

United City returned to the PFL in the 2024 season. They withdrew yet again in the following season.

== History ==
=== As Ceres (2012–2020) ===
==== Early years ====
The club was founded by Leo Rey Yanson in 2012 as Ceres–La Salle, with the cooperation of the University of St. La Salle of Bacolod. The club was initially composed of college and some Korean players, becoming primarily led by Philippines national team players. A notable early victory was at the inaugural Negros Men's Open Football Championships in January 2012, an 11–0 win against Bacolod United in the final.

United City's first national tournament was the 2012–13 PFF National Men's Club Championship. United City won the championship trophy with a 1–0 victory against Pasargad in the final. En route to the championship, they won matches against Stallion, Global and Kaya.

==== United Football League ====
After their victory in the PFF championship, Ceres expressed an intention to join the United Football League (UFL, the top-tier football league in the Philippines at that time). They were not able to play in the 2013 UFL season, however, and joined the league for the 2013 UFL Cup.

Ceres debuted in the UFL in the 2014 season in Division 2. The club dominated the division, and was promoted to Division 1 the following season. Ceres were considered serious contenders for the 2015 UFL Division 1 title in their first year, and clinched the championship with several regular-season games to play. They were unable to replicate their success in the 2016 season, and finished second.

==== First three seasons in the Philippines Football League ====

The starting lineup in the club's 2017 AFC Cup zonal semi-final triumph against Johor Darul Ta'zim.

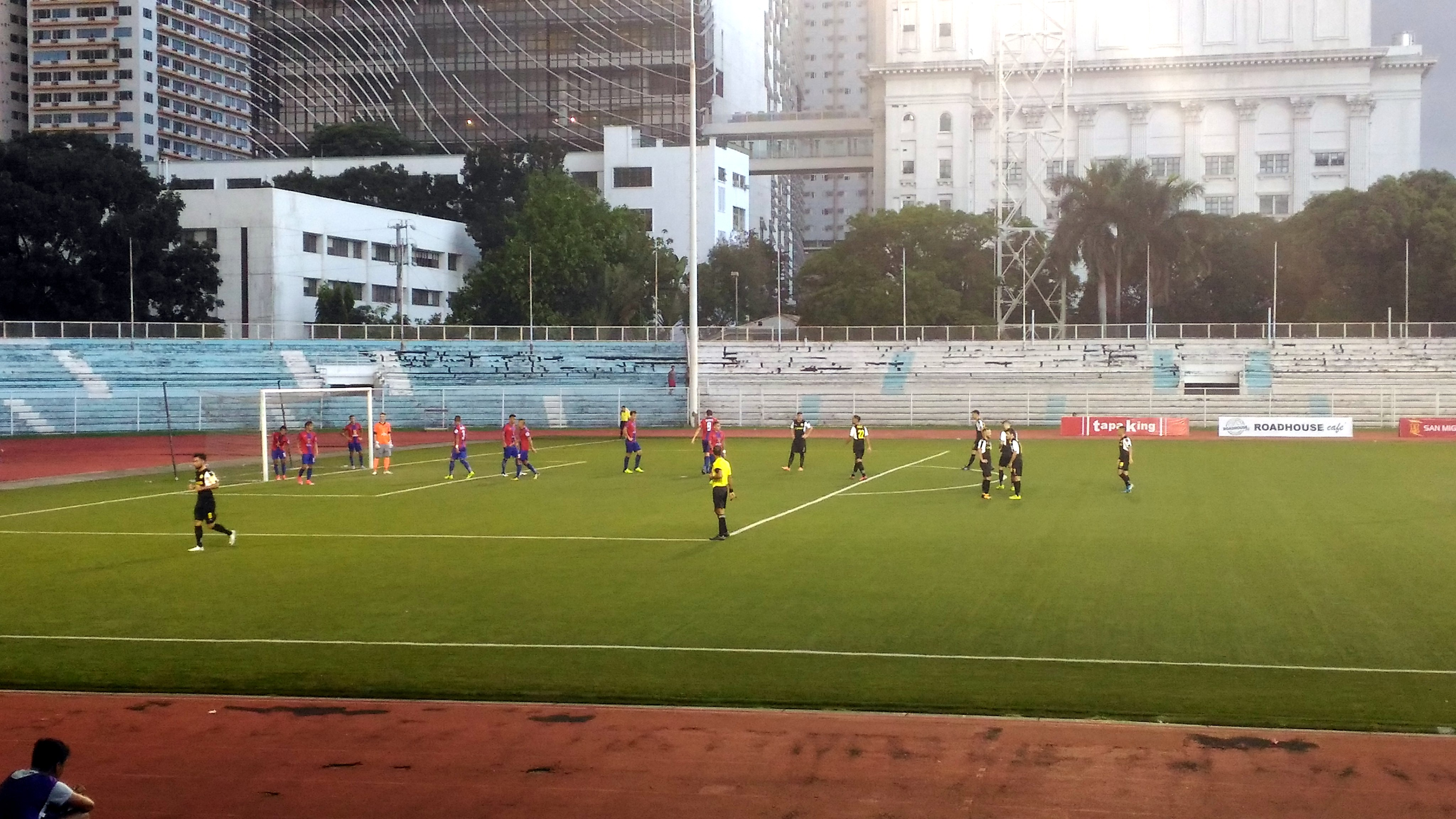
Davao Aguilas vs. Ceres–Negros, September 16, 2017.

When the Philippines Football League supplanted the UFL as the Philippines' top-tier football league, Ceres was among the pioneer clubs of the 2017 inaugural season. Ceres renamed themselves the Ceres–Negros, designating the Panaad Stadium in Bacolod as their home venue. Ceres-Negros won the championship in 2017, 2018 and 2019, and the 2019 Copa Paulino Alcantara title.

Issues at Vallacar Transit affected Ceres–Negros operations during the 2019 season, when the team's status was uncertain due to a Yanson family dispute about Vallacar's management. Although Ceres chairman Leo Rey Yanson lost control of Vallacar after four of his siblings staged a boardroom coup in July, he regained control of the company in August. Despite the turmoil, Ceres clinched the league title.

=== As United City (2020–2023) ===
Amidst the COVID-19 pandemic and after the 2020 PFL season was postponed, rumors of Ceres–Negros' departure from the league (or disbanding) have circulated. The pandemic triggered a force majeure which terminated the contracts of all the club's players.

In July 2020, Ceres-Negros announced that club owner and chairman Leo Rey Yanson would step down and the club would negotiate with potential investors. Emirati-Philippine sports marketing firm MMC Sportz Asia was announced as the negotiator on behalf of the new group of owners of Ceres–Negros, and renamed the club as United City. The new owners said that the core of the original club (16 of its 21 players) would remain. MMC Sportz Asia had been involved in Philippine football as appointed marketing arm of Global F.C. in 2019, but terminated their agreement during the season due to non payment by the club.

United City's, (owned by United City Football Company Inc.) new management re-signed Ceres' former players, intending to retain the core of its previous owner. They include team captain Stephan Schröck, who was appointed a player-coach. They went on to clinch the league title of the shortened 2020 season which was held in a bubble due to the pandemic. The league title was their first as United City, and their fourth overall.

==== AFC Champions League debut ====
United City are also the first Filipino Club to qualify in the AFC Champions League group stage. On 8 July 2021, the club beat Chinese side, Beijing Guoan to become the first-ever Filipino club to win an AFC Champions League group stage match.

In June 2021, in a lead up to the 2021 season, United City announced that it has adopted New Clark City in Capas, Tarlac as its home locality. It also has entered a partnership with the local government of Pampanga. The club with intentions to have its home stadium also announced that it would be temporarily using the New Clark City Stadium as its home venue. It also said that it would be changing its name to United Clark after the 2021 season however, the name change did not happen as planned.

United City was not able to play in their home venue either for the 2021 season since most games were still held at the PFF National Training Center. They are finally set to play their first home game at the NCC Athletics Stadium on October 22, 2022, as part of the 2022–23 PFL season.

==== Withdrawal from the Philippines Football League ====
Following the conclusion of the first half of the 2022–23 season, United City released its players and staff. The PFL and the PFF would confirm the withdrawal of the club from the league in February 2023. This is due to the financial issues arising from the club's deal with investor Riau Capital Live (RCL) which is based in Singapore. The RCL entered into a major agreement in United City in mid-2021 but later defaulted in October 2022. The non-fulfillment of RCL's final settlement with United City led to the withdrawal of the club while the results of a legal dispute is pending.

==== Return to the Philippines Football League ====
United City announced its return to the PFL for the 2024 season, a hybrid tournament that showcases professional and amateur teams. However, they withdrew again the following season reportedly due to financial issues.

== Crest and colors ==
2016–2020 club crest

2019 Ceres–Negros home kit. As Ceres, the kit was predominantly yellow.

As Ceres, the club crest was derived from the Ceres Liner emblem. It was encircled in green to represent the University of St. La Salle in Bacolod, which is known for its football team. The center is the oval logo of the Yanson company: Vallacar Transit, which owned the club at that time. The team wore yellow home shirts.

After the renaming of Ceres-Negros to United City, a contest to design a new club crest was announced. The new crest, a circle with a football in the center, was unveiled on July 29, 2020. It was designed by Gerard Endaya, creative director of Grit Sports. Some of the crest's elements note United City's past as Ceres; its shape was carried over from its predecessor, and the two stars symbolize United City's incarnations as Ceres–La Salle and Ceres–Negros.

== Kit manufacturers and shirt sponsors ==
Period	Kit manufacturer	Shirt sponsor
2017	Puma	Ceres
2018	Adidas	Ceres
2019	Grand Sport	Ceres
2020	Montè Athletics	Manila Regenerative Center; Midas Magnesium; Gatorade
2021–2022	Chronos Athletics	Manila Regenerative Center; Midas Magnesium; Gatorade; BCDA; Allianz
2024	Almer Apparel	UCFC Fan Token by Blocksport; Fairmont Makati

== Stadium ==
United City uses the New Clark City Athletics Stadium in New Clark City, Capas, Tarlac since 2021 as their temporary home venue. They plan to build their own stadium beside Clark International Airport in the nearby province of Pampanga. The club has previously announced plans to construct a 7,500 to 10,000-seat capacity stadium. As Ceres, the club had the Panaad Stadium in Bacolod as its home venue.

== Technical staff ==
As of 13 March 2024

Position	Name
President	(Germany) Eric Gottschalk
Team manager	(Philippines) Maya Montecillo
Head coach	(Spain) Ramon Tribulietx
Assistant coach	(Philippines) Mark Antonio Francisco
Goalkeeping coach	(Philippines) Kim Versales
Physiotherapist	(Philippines) Alex Almonte
Physiotherapist	(Philippines) Janus Dacumos
Kitman	(Philippines) Mark Perez

== Other divisions ==
=== Youth club ===
United City FC sponsored a youth club with the same name, which competed in the 7's Football League.

=== Esports club ===
UCFC Esports, serves as the esports division of United City. A joint venture with BrenPro, Inc., its formation was announced in June 2021 by the club. It intends to compete in FIFA, League of Legends: Wild Rift, Mobile Legends: Bang Bang, and Valorant competitions. UCFC Esports will compete in the 2021 Southeast Asia in the Champions eFootball (CeF), a regional eFootball (PES) tournament.

== Head coaches ==
Name	Year(s)
(Philippines) Freddie Lazarito	2012–2013
(Philippines) Ali Go	2013–2014
(South Korea) Cha Seung-ryong	2014–2015
(Philippines) Ali Go	2015–2016
(Philippines) Frank Muescan	2016 (AFC Cup)
(Serbia) Risto Vidaković	2016–2020
(Philippines) Frank Muescan (interim)	2020
(England) Trevor Morgan (Note: Morgan was hired by United City F.C. supposedly for the 2020 PFL season. However Frank Muescan coached in Morgan's stead due to Morgan, who was based in Australia at that time, unable to go to the Philippines due to logistical issues caused by the COVID-19 pandemic.)	2020
(England) Jason Withe (Note: Withe was hired by United City F.C. as the club's official head coach, at least for its 2021 AFC Champions League campaign due to White possessing the needed coaching license to lead a team in the continental tournament which caretaker coach, Frank Muescan, did not have. Muescan served as head coach in a de facto capacity, with Withe serving as a consultant to Muescan.)	2021
(Spain) Joan Esteva	2022
(Romania) Marian Mihail	2024
(Spain) Ramon Tribulietx	2024–

== Honors ==
=== League ===
- Philippines Football League
  - Winners: 2017, 2018, 2019, 2020
- United Football League Division 1
  - Winners: 2015
  - Runners-up: 2016
- United Football League Division 2
  - Winners: 2014

=== Cups ===
- Copa Paulino Alcantara
  - Winners: 2019, 2022
- PFF National Men's Club Championship
  - Winners: 2012–13, 2013–14
- UFL Cup
  - Runners-up: 2015, 2016
- UFL FA League Cup
  - Winners: 2014

== Records ==
Season	Division	League position	Copa Paulino Alcantara	PFF NMCC	UFL Cup	League Cup	Singapore Cup	AFC President's Cup	AFC Cup	AFC Champions League
2013	—	—	—	1st	Quarter-final	—	—	—	—	—
2014	2 (P)	1st	—	1st	—	1st	—	Group stage	—	—
2015	1	1st	—	3rd	2nd	—	—	—	Play-off Round	—
2016	1	2nd	—	—	2nd	—	3rd	—	Round of 16	—
2017	1	2nd (Regular Season)	—	—	—	—	Preliminary Round	—	Inter Zone Semi-final	—
2017	1	1st (Final Series)	—	—	—	—	Preliminary Round	—	Inter Zone Semi-final	—
2018	1	1st	Group stage	—	—	—	—	—	ASEAN Zonal Final	Play-off round
2019	1	1st	1st	—	—	—	—	—	ASEAN Zonal Semi-Final	Preliminary Round
2020	1	1st	—	—	—	—	—	—	Group stage (Canceled)	Play-off round
2021	—	Canceled	Withdrew	—	—	—	—	—	—	Group stage
2022–23	1	Withdrew	1st	—	—	—	—	—	—	—
2024	1	6th	—	—	—	—	—	—	—	—
2024–25	1	Withdrew	—	—	—	—	—	—	—	—
Updated as of 21 September 2024

== Continental record ==
Season	Competition	Round	Club	Score		Agg. / Pos.
Season	Competition	Round	Club	Home	Away	Agg. / Pos.
2014	AFC President's Cup	Group Stage	(North Korea) Rimyongsu	2–2		Group B (3rd)
2014	AFC President's Cup	Group Stage	(Chinese Taipei) Tatung	2–0		Group B (3rd)
2014	AFC President's Cup	Group Stage	(Turkmenistan) HTTU	1–2		Group B (3rd)
2015	AFC Cup	Play-off Round	(Maldives) Maziya	0–1		—
2016	AFC Cup	Group Stage	(Malaysia) Selangor FA	2–2	0–0	Group E (1st)
2016	AFC Cup	Group Stage	(Bangladesh) Sheikh Jamal Dhanmondi	5–0	2–0	Group E (1st)
2016	AFC Cup	Group Stage	(Singapore) Tampines Rovers	2–1	1–1	Group E (1st)
2016	AFC Cup	Round of 16	(Hong Kong) South China	0–1 (a.e.t)		—
2017	AFC Cup	Group Stage	(Vietnam) Hà Nội	6–2	1–1	Group G (1st)
2017	AFC Cup	Group Stage	(Singapore) Tampines Rovers	5–0	4–2	Group G (1st)
2017	AFC Cup	Group Stage	(Malaysia) Felda United	0–0	0–3	Group G (1st)
2017	AFC Cup	ASEAN Zonal Semifinal	(Malaysia) Johor Darul Ta'zim	2–1	2–3	4–4 (a)
2017	AFC Cup	ASEAN Zonal Final	(Singapore) Home United	2–0	1–2	3–2
2017	AFC Cup	Inter-zone Play-off Semifinal	(Tajikistan) Istiklol	1–1	0–4	1–5
2018	AFC Champions League	Preliminary Round 1	(Myanmar) Shan United	1–1 (a.e.t) (4–3 p)		—
2018	AFC Champions League	Preliminary Round 2	(Australia) Brisbane Roar	3–2		—
2018	AFC Champions League	Play-off Round	(China) Tianjin Quanjian	0–2		—
2018	AFC Cup	Group Stage	(Cambodia) Boeung Ket Angkor	9–0	4–0	Group F 2nd (Best Runner-Up)
2018	AFC Cup	Group Stage	(Singapore) Home United	0–2	1–1	Group F 2nd (Best Runner-Up)
2018	AFC Cup	Group Stage	(Myanmar) Shan United	1–0	2–0	Group F 2nd (Best Runner-Up)
2018	AFC Cup	ASEAN Zonal Semifinal	(Myanmar) Yangon United	4–2	2–3	6–5
2018	AFC Cup	ASEAN Zonal Final	(Singapore) Home United	1–1	0–2	1–3
2019	AFC Champions League	Preliminary Round 1	(Myanmar) Yangon United	1–2		—
2019	AFC Cup	Group Stage	(Myanmar) Shan United	3–2	5–0	Group G (1st)
2019	AFC Cup	Group Stage	(Vietnam) Becamex Bình Dương	0–1	3–1	Group G (1st)
2019	AFC Cup	Group Stage	(Indonesia) Persija Jakarta	1–0	3–2	Group G (1st)
2019	AFC Cup	ASEAN Zonal Semifinal	(Vietnam) Hà Nội	1–1	1–2	2–3
2020	AFC Champions League	Preliminary Round 1	(Myanmar) Shan United	3–2		—
2020	AFC Champions League	Preliminary Round 2	(Thailand) Port	1–0		—
2020	AFC Champions League	Play-off Round	(Japan) FC Tokyo	0–2		—
2020	AFC Cup	Group Stage	(Cambodia) Svay Rieng	4–0	Cancelled	Group G (1st)
2020	AFC Cup	Group Stage	(Vietnam) Than Quảng Ninh	2–2	Cancelled	Group G (1st)
2020	AFC Cup	Group Stage	(Indonesia) Bali United	4–0	Cancelled	Group G (1st)
2021	AFC Champions League	Group Stage	(China) Beijing Guoan	1–1	3–2	Group I (3rd)
2021	AFC Champions League	Group Stage	(South Korea) Daegu FC	0–4	0–7	Group I (3rd)
2021	AFC Champions League	Group Stage	(Japan) Kawasaki Frontale	0–2	0–8	Group I (3rd)
2022	AFC Champions League	Group Stage	(South Korea) Jeonnam Dragons	0–1	0–2	Group F (4th)
2022	AFC Champions League	Group Stage	(Australia) Melbourne City	0–3	0–3	Group F (4th)
2022	AFC Champions League	Group Stage	(Thailand) BG Pathum United	1–3	0–5	Group F (4th)

=== Overall record ===
Accurate as of February 11, 2020.

Competition	Played	Won	Drew	Lost	GF	GA	GD	Win%
AFC Champions League / AFC Champions League Elite	7	3	1	3	9	11	−2	42.86
AFC Cup / AFC Champions League Two	39	19	9	11	81	45	+36	48.72
AFC President's Cup / AFC Challenge League	3	1	1	1	5	4	+1	33.33
Total	49	23	11	15	95	60	+35	46.94

== Invitational tournaments ==
Season	Competition	Round	Club	Home	Away	Aggregate
2016	Singapore Cup	Preliminary Round	(Singapore) Young Lions	3–1 (a.e.t)		
2016	Singapore Cup	Quarter-final	(Brunei) DPMM FC	2–3	3–0	5–3
2016	Singapore Cup	Semi-final	(Singapore) Tampines Rovers	2–3	1–2	3–5
2016	Singapore Cup	Third place	(Singapore) Balestier Khalsa	2–1		
2017	Singapore Cup	Preliminary Round	(Singapore) Hougang United	0–1		

=== AFC Club ranking ===
As of 25 February 2024.

Current Rank	Country	Team
371	(Philippines)	United City
372	(Thailand)	Samut Songkhram
373	(Lebanon)	AC Tripoli
374	(Thailand)	TOT Sport Club
375	(United Arab Emirates)	Al-Dhafra
