= 2023 AFC Asian Cup squads =

The 2023 AFC Asian Cup was an international football tournament held in Qatar from 12 January to 10 February 2024. The 24 national teams involved in the tournament were required to register a squad with a minimum of 18 players and a maximum of 26 players, at least three of whom had to be goalkeepers. Only players in these squads were eligible to take part in the tournament.

Before announcing their final squads, teams had to send AFC a provisional squad of 18 to 50 players; each country's final squad had to be submitted at least ten days prior to the first match of the tournament (Regulation 26.7.3). Replacement of players was permitted until six hours before the team's first Asian Cup game (Regulation 26.9). In December 2023, AFC approved the increase of the maximum number of players included on the final list from 23 to 26 (Regulation 26.7). On 4 January 2024, the AFC published the final lists with squad numbers.

The age listed for each player is as of 12 January 2024, the first day of the tournament. The numbers of caps and goals listed for each player do not include any matches played after the start of tournament. Each club listed here are clubs which last represented by players before heading into tournament and nationality for each club reflects the national association (not the league) to which the club is affiliated. A flag is included for coaches that are of a different nationality than their own national team.

== Group A ==
=== Qatar ===
Qatar announced a 27-men preliminary squad on 22 December 2023. On 30 December, Osamah Al-Tairi withdrew injured and was replaced by Ismaeel Mohammad. On 2 January 2024, Mohammed Muntari withdrew injured and was replaced by Khaled Mohammed. The final squad was announced on 3 January.

Coach: (Spain) Tintín Márquez

No.	Pos.	Player	Date of birth (age)	Caps	Goals	Club
1	GK	Saad Al-Sheeb	19 February 1990 (aged 33)	84	0	(Qatar Football Association) Al-Sadd
2	DF	Pedro Miguel	6 August 1990 (aged 33)	90	1	(Qatar Football Association) Al-Sadd
3	DF	Al-Mahdi Ali Mukhtar	2 March 1992 (aged 31)	58	3	(Qatar Football Association) Al-Wakrah
4	MF	Mohammed Waad	18 September 1999 (aged 24)	36	0	(Qatar Football Association) Al-Sadd
5	DF	Tarek Salman	5 December 1997 (aged 26)	71	0	(Qatar Football Association) Al-Sadd
6	MF	Abdulaziz Hatem	1 January 1990 (aged 34)	112	11	(Qatar Football Association) Al-Rayyan
7	FW	Ahmed Alaaeldin	31 January 1993 (aged 30)	60	7	(Qatar Football Association) Al-Gharafa
8	MF	Ali Assadalla	19 January 1993 (aged 30)	72	12	(Qatar Football Association) Al-Sadd
9	FW	Yusuf Abdurisag	6 August 1999 (aged 24)	26	3	(Qatar Football Association) Al-Sadd
10	MF	Hassan Al-Haydos (captain)	11 December 1990 (aged 33)	176	39	(Qatar Football Association) Al-Sadd
11	FW	Akram Afif	18 November 1996 (aged 27)	96	26	(Qatar Football Association) Al-Sadd
12	DF	Lucas Mendes	3 July 1990 (aged 33)	1	0	(Qatar Football Association) Al-Wakrah
13	FW	Khalid Muneer	24 February 1998 (aged 25)	8	1	(Qatar Football Association) Al-Wakrah
14	DF	Homam Ahmed	25 August 1999 (aged 24)	47	3	(Qatar Football Association) Al-Gharafa
15	DF	Bassam Al-Rawi	16 December 1997 (aged 26)	69	2	(Qatar Football Association) Al-Rayyan
16	DF	Boualem Khoukhi	9 July 1990 (aged 33)	110	20	(Qatar Football Association) Al-Sadd
17	FW	Ismaeel Mohammad	5 April 1990 (aged 33)	70	4	(Qatar Football Association) Al-Duhail
18	DF	Sultan Al-Brake	7 April 1996 (aged 27)	4	0	(Qatar Football Association) Al-Duhail
19	FW	Almoez Ali	19 August 1996 (aged 27)	96	50	(Qatar Football Association) Al-Duhail
20	MF	Ahmed Fatehi	25 January 1993 (aged 30)	22	0	(Qatar Football Association) Al-Arabi
21	GK	Salah Zakaria	24 April 1999 (aged 24)	4	0	(Qatar Football Association) Al-Duhail
22	GK	Meshaal Barsham	14 February 1998 (aged 25)	33	0	(Qatar Football Association) Al-Sadd
23	MF	Mostafa Meshaal	28 March 2001 (aged 22)	13	2	(Qatar Football Association) Al-Sadd
24	MF	Jassem Gaber	20 February 2002 (aged 21)	12	0	(Qatar Football Association) Al-Arabi
25	FW	Ahmed Al-Ganehi	22 September 2000 (aged 23)	0	0	(Qatar Football Association) Al-Gharafa
26	MF	Khaled Mohammed	7 June 2000 (aged 23)	2	0	(Qatar Football Association) Al-Duhail

=== China ===
China announced their final squad on 12 December 2023. On 21 December, Nico Yennaris withdrew from the squad for personal reasons and was replaced by Xu Xin.

Coach: (Serbia) Aleksandar Janković

No.	Pos.	Player	Date of birth (age)	Caps	Goals	Club
1	GK	Yan Junling	28 January 1991 (aged 32)	53	0	(Chinese Football Association) Shanghai Port
2	DF	Jiang Guangtai	30 May 1994 (aged 29)	21	1	(Chinese Football Association) Shanghai Port
3	DF	Zhu Chenjie	23 August 2000 (aged 23)	23	1	(Chinese Football Association) Shanghai Shenhua
4	DF	Li Lei	30 May 1992 (aged 31)	12	0	(Chinese Football Association) Beijing Guoan
5	DF	Zhang Linpeng	9 May 1989 (aged 34)	101	6	(Chinese Football Association) Shanghai Port
6	MF	Wang Shangyuan	2 June 1993 (aged 30)	12	1	(Chinese Football Association) Henan
7	FW	Wu Lei	19 November 1991 (aged 32)	91	32	(Chinese Football Association) Shanghai Port
8	MF	Xu Xin	19 April 1994 (aged 29)	13	1	(Chinese Football Association) Shanghai Port
9	FW	Zhang Yuning	5 January 1997 (aged 27)	25	5	(Chinese Football Association) Beijing Guoan
10	MF	Xie Pengfei	29 June 1993 (aged 30)	13	0	(Chinese Football Association) Wuhan Three Towns
11	FW	Tan Long	1 April 1988 (aged 35)	17	3	(Chinese Football Association) Changchun Yatai
12	GK	Jian Tao	22 June 2001 (aged 22)	0	0	(Chinese Football Association) Chengdu Rongcheng
13	DF	Xu Haofeng	27 January 1999 (aged 24)	4	0	(Chinese Football Association) Shenzhen
14	GK	Wang Dalei	10 January 1989 (aged 35)	28	0	(Chinese Football Association) Shandong Taishan
15	MF	Wu Xi (captain)	19 February 1989 (aged 34)	88	9	(Chinese Football Association) Shanghai Shenhua
16	MF	Gao Tianyi	1 July 1998 (aged 25)	4	0	(Chinese Football Association) Beijing Guoan
17	MF	Chen Pu	15 January 1997 (aged 26)	7	0	(Chinese Football Association) Shandong Taishan
18	MF	Dai Weijun	25 July 1999 (aged 24)	12	0	(Chinese Football Association) Shanghai Shenhua
19	DF	Liu Yang	17 June 1995 (aged 28)	22	0	(Chinese Football Association) Shandong Taishan
20	FW	Wei Shihao	8 April 1995 (aged 28)	26	3	(Chinese Football Association) Wuhan Three Towns
21	MF	Liu Binbin	16 June 1993 (aged 30)	18	1	(Chinese Football Association) Shandong Taishan
22	DF	Wu Shaocong	20 March 2000 (aged 23)	7	0	(Turkish Football Federation) Gençlerbirliği
23	MF	Lin Liangming	4 June 1997 (aged 26)	7	2	(Chinese Football Association) Dalian Pro
24	DF	Jiang Shenglong	24 December 2000 (aged 23)	6	0	(Chinese Football Association) Shanghai Shenhua
25	GK	Liu Dianzuo	25 June 1990 (aged 33)	4	0	(Chinese Football Association) Wuhan Three Towns
26	MF	Wang Qiuming	9 January 1993 (aged 31)	5	1	(Chinese Football Association) Tianjin Jinmen Tiger

=== Tajikistan ===
Tajikistan announced a 27-men preliminary squad on 12 December 2023. The final squad was announced on 4 January 2024. On 12 January, Amirbek Juraboev withdrew injured and was replaced by Komron Tursunov.

Coach: (Croatia) Petar Šegrt

No.	Pos.	Player	Date of birth (age)	Caps	Goals	Club
1	GK	Rustam Yatimov	13 July 1998 (aged 25)	36	0	(Tajikistan Football Federation) Istiklol
2	DF	Zoir Dzhuraboyev	16 September 1998 (aged 25)	32	1	(Uzbekistan Football Association) Neftchi Fergana
3	DF	Tabrezi Davlatmir	6 June 1998 (aged 25)	28	0	(Tajikistan Football Federation) Istiklol
4	DF	Kholmurod Nazarov	4 February 1992 (aged 31)	3	0	(Tajikistan Football Federation) Ravshan Kulob
5	DF	Manuchekhr Safarov	31 May 2001 (aged 22)	30	0	(Uzbekistan Football Association) Neftchi Fergana
6	DF	Vakhdat Khanonov	25 July 2000 (aged 23)	25	2	(Football Federation Islamic Republic of Iran) Persepolis
7	MF	Parvizdzhon Umarbayev	1 November 1994 (aged 29)	45	9	(Bulgarian Football Union) CSKA 1948
8	MF	Komron Tursunov	24 April 1996 (aged 27)	28	6	(All India Football Federation) Gokulam Kerala
9	FW	Rustam Soirov	12 September 2002 (aged 21)	12	2	(Uzbekistan Football Association) Lokomotiv Tashkent
10	MF	Alisher Dzhalilov	29 August 1993 (aged 30)	20	6	(Tajikistan Football Federation) Istiklol
11	MF	Mukhammadzhon Rakhimov	15 October 1998 (aged 25)	48	3	(Uzbekistan Football Association) Bukhara
12	DF	Sodikjon Kurbonov	19 January 2003 (aged 20)	2	0	(Tajikistan Football Federation) Istiklol
13	MF	Amadoni Kamolov	16 January 2003 (aged 20)	2	2	(Tajikistan Football Federation) Istiklol
14	MF	Alisher Shukurov	30 March 2002 (aged 21)	1	0	(Tajikistan Football Federation) Kuktosh
15	FW	Shervoni Mabatshoev	4 December 2000 (aged 23)	17	3	(Tajikistan Football Federation) Istiklol
16	GK	Daler Barotov	29 January 1999 (aged 24)	2	0	(Tajikistan Football Federation) Istaravshan
17	MF	Ehson Panjshanbe	12 May 1999 (aged 24)	45	6	(Tajikistan Football Federation) Istiklol
18	MF	Ruslan Khayloev	29 October 2003 (aged 20)	2	0	(Russian Football Union) Tyumen
19	DF	Akhtam Nazarov (captain)	29 September 1992 (aged 31)	76	5	(Tajikistan Football Federation) Istiklol
20	MF	Alidzhoni Ayni	6 August 2004 (aged 19)	10	0	(Tajikistan Football Federation) Istiklol
21	MF	Vaisiddin Safarov	15 April 1996 (aged 27)	3	0	(Tajikistan Football Federation) CSKA Pamir Dushanbe
22	FW	Shahrom Samiev	8 February 2001 (aged 22)	22	7	(Moldovan Football Federation) Milsami Orhei
23	GK	Mukhriddin Khasanov	23 September 2002 (aged 21)	1	0	(Tajikistan Football Federation) Istiklol
24	DF	Daler Imomnazarov	31 May 1995 (aged 28)	4	0	(Tajikistan Football Federation) Eskhata Khujand
25	FW	Nuriddin Khamrokulov	25 October 1999 (aged 24)	12	1	(Tajikistan Football Federation) Regar-TadAZ Tursunzoda
26	FW	Muhammadali Azizboev	4 January 2003 (aged 21)	2	0	(Tajikistan Football Federation) Khosilot Farkhor

=== Lebanon ===
Lebanon announced a 31-men preliminary squad on 16 December 2023. The final squad was announced on 30 December. On 6 January 2024, George Felix Melki withdrew injured and was replaced by Khalil Khamis.

Coach: (Montenegro) Miodrag Radulović

No.	Pos.	Player	Date of birth (age)	Caps	Goals	Club
1	GK	Mehdi Khalil	19 September 1991 (aged 32)	56	0	(Jordan Football Association) Al-Faisaly
2	MF	Yahya El Hindi	24 September 1998 (aged 25)	4	0	(Lebanese Football Association) Al-Ansar
3	DF	Maher Sabra	14 January 1992 (aged 31)	20	1	(Lebanese Football Association) Nejmeh
4	DF	Nour Mansour	22 October 1989 (aged 34)	65	3	(Lebanese Football Association) Al-Ahed
5	DF	Nassar Nassar	1 January 1992 (aged 32)	18	0	(Lebanese Football Association) Al-Ansar
6	DF	Hussein Zein	27 January 1995 (aged 28)	30	0	(Lebanese Football Association) Al-Ahed
7	FW	Hassan Maatouk (captain)	10 August 1987 (aged 36)	116	23	(Lebanese Football Association) Al-Ansar
8	FW	Soony Saad	17 August 1992 (aged 31)	37	7	(Football Association of Malaysia) Penang
9	FW	Hilal El-Helwe	24 November 1994 (aged 29)	50	9	(Lebanese Football Association) Bourj
10	MF	Mohamad Haidar	8 November 1989 (aged 34)	89	5	(Lebanese Football Association) Al-Ahed
11	FW	Omar Chaaban	3 January 1994 (aged 30)	11	1	(The Football Association) AFC Wimbledon
12	DF	Robert Alexander Melki	14 November 1992 (aged 31)	26	0	(Lebanese Football Association) Al-Ansar
13	DF	Khalil Khamis	12 January 1995 (aged 29)	3	0	(Lebanese Football Association) Al-Ahed
14	MF	Mouhammed-Ali Dhaini	1 March 1994 (aged 29)	26	0	(Lebanese Football Association) Al-Ansar
15	MF	Jihad Ayoub	30 March 1995 (aged 28)	13	0	(Football Association of Indonesia) PSS Sleman
16	MF	Walid Shour	10 June 1996 (aged 27)	22	0	(Lebanese Football Association) Al-Ahed
17	FW	Ali Al Haj	2 February 2001 (aged 22)	13	1	(Lebanese Football Association) Al-Ahed
18	DF	Kassem El Zein	2 December 1990 (aged 33)	40	1	(Lebanese Football Association) Nejmeh
19	FW	Daniel Kuri	22 January 1999 (aged 24)	6	0	(Mexican Football Federation) Atlante
20	MF	Ali Tneich	16 July 1992 (aged 31)	16	1	(Lebanese Football Association) Al-Ansar
21	GK	Mostafa Matar	10 September 1995 (aged 28)	22	0	(Lebanese Football Association) Al-Ahed
22	FW	Bassel Jradi	6 July 1993 (aged 30)	20	2	(Football Association of Thailand) Bangkok United
23	GK	Ali Sabeh	24 June 1994 (aged 29)	9	0	(Lebanese Football Association) Nejmeh
24	FW	Gabriel Bitar	23 August 1998 (aged 25)	3	0	(Canadian Soccer Association) Vancouver FC
25	MF	Hasan Srour	18 December 2001 (aged 22)	9	0	(Lebanese Football Association) Al-Ahed
26	DF	Hassan Chaitou	16 June 1991 (aged 32)	19	0	(Lebanese Football Association) Safa

== Group B ==
=== Australia ===
Australia announced their final squad on 22 December 2023.

Coach: Graham Arnold

No.	Pos.	Player	Date of birth (age)	Caps	Goals	Club
1	GK	Mathew Ryan (captain)	8 April 1992 (aged 31)	86	0	(Royal Dutch Football Association) AZ
2	DF	Thomas Deng	20 March 1997 (aged 26)	3	0	(Japan Football Association) Albirex Niigata
3	DF	Nathaniel Atkinson	13 June 1999 (aged 24)	8	0	(Scottish Football Association) Heart of Midlothian
4	DF	Kye Rowles	24 June 1998 (aged 25)	13	0	(Scottish Football Association) Heart of Midlothian
5	DF	Jordan Bos	29 October 2002 (aged 21)	6	0	(Royal Belgian Football Association) Westerlo
6	FW	Martin Boyle	25 April 1993 (aged 30)	23	6	(Scottish Football Association) Hibernian
7	FW	Samuel Silvera	25 October 2000 (aged 23)	2	0	(The Football Association) Middlesbrough
8	MF	Connor Metcalfe	5 November 1999 (aged 24)	13	0	(German Football Association) FC St. Pauli
9	FW	Bruno Fornaroli	7 September 1987 (aged 36)	2	0	(Football Australia) Melbourne Victory
10	FW	Kusini Yengi	15 January 1999 (aged 24)	1	0	(The Football Association) Portsmouth
11	FW	Marco Tilio	23 August 2001 (aged 22)	7	0	(Scottish Football Association) Celtic
12	GK	Lawrence Thomas	9 May 1992 (aged 31)	1	0	(Football Australia) Western Sydney Wanderers
13	MF	Aiden O'Neill	4 July 1998 (aged 25)	7	0	(Royal Belgian Football Association) Standard Liège
14	MF	Riley McGree	2 November 1998 (aged 25)	18	1	(The Football Association) Middlesbrough
15	FW	Mitchell Duke	18 January 1991 (aged 32)	32	11	(Japan Football Association) Machida Zelvia
16	DF	Aziz Behich	16 December 1990 (aged 33)	63	2	(Football Australia) Melbourne City
17	MF	Keanu Baccus	7 June 1998 (aged 25)	12	0	(Scottish Football Association) St Mirren
18	GK	Joe Gauci	4 July 2000 (aged 23)	1	0	(Football Australia) Adelaide United
19	DF	Harry Souttar	22 October 1998 (aged 25)	21	10	(The Football Association) Leicester City
20	DF	Lewis Miller	24 August 2000 (aged 23)	4	0	(Scottish Football Association) Hibernian
21	DF	Cameron Burgess	21 October 1995 (aged 28)	3	0	(The Football Association) Ipswich Town
22	MF	Jackson Irvine	7 March 1993 (aged 30)	60	9	(German Football Association) FC St. Pauli
23	FW	Craig Goodwin	16 December 1991 (aged 32)	20	2	(Saudi Arabian Football Federation) Al-Wehda
24	MF	Patrick Yazbek	5 April 2002 (aged 21)	0	0	(Norwegian Football Federation) Viking
25	DF	Gethin Jones	13 October 1995 (aged 28)	0	0	(The Football Association) Bolton Wanderers
26	FW	John Iredale	1 August 1999 (aged 24)	0	0	(German Football Association) Wehen Wiesbaden

=== Uzbekistan ===
Uzbekistan announced a 28-men preliminary squad on 30 December 2023. The final squad was announced on 4 January 2024. On 11 January, Husniddin Aliqulov withdrew injured and was replaced by Shokhboz Umarov.

Coach: (Slovenia) Srečko Katanec

No.	Pos.	Player	Date of birth (age)	Caps	Goals	Club
1	GK	Utkir Yusupov	4 January 1991 (aged 33)	21	0	(Uzbekistan Football Association) Navbahor Namangan
2	DF	Mukhammadkodir Khamraliev	6 July 2001 (aged 22)	0	0	(Uzbekistan Football Association) Pakhtakor Tashkent
3	DF	Khojiakbar Alijonov	19 April 1997 (aged 26)	32	1	(Uzbekistan Football Association) Pakhtakor Tashkent
4	DF	Farrukh Sayfiev	17 January 1991 (aged 32)	48	1	(Uzbekistan Football Association) Pakhtakor Tashkent
5	DF	Rustam Ashurmatov	7 July 1996 (aged 27)	28	0	(Russian Football Union) Rubin Kazan
6	MF	Diyor Kholmatov	22 July 2002 (aged 21)	0	0	(Uzbekistan Football Association) Pakhtakor Tashkent
7	MF	Otabek Shukurov	22 June 1996 (aged 27)	61	7	(Turkish Football Federation) Fatih Karagümrük
8	MF	Jamshid Iskanderov	16 October 1993 (aged 30)	31	4	(Uzbekistan Football Association) Navbahor Namangan
9	MF	Odiljon Hamrobekov	13 February 1996 (aged 27)	45	0	(Uzbekistan Football Association) Pakhtakor Tashkent
10	MF	Jaloliddin Masharipov (captain)	1 September 1993 (aged 30)	54	10	(Hellenic Football Federation) Panserraikos
11	MF	Oston Urunov	19 December 2000 (aged 23)	21	5	(Uzbekistan Football Association) Navbahor Namangan
12	GK	Abduvohid Nematov	20 March 2001 (aged 22)	7	0	(Uzbekistan Football Association) Nasaf
13	DF	Sherzod Nasrullaev	23 July 1998 (aged 25)	17	0	(Uzbekistan Football Association) Nasaf
14	MF	Jamshid Boltaboev	3 October 1996 (aged 27)	2	0	(Uzbekistan Football Association) Navbahor Namangan
15	DF	Umar Eshmurodov	30 November 1992 (aged 31)	20	0	(Uzbekistan Football Association) Nasaf
16	GK	Botirali Ergashev	23 June 1995 (aged 28)	3	0	(Uzbekistan Football Association) AGMK
17	FW	Bobur Abdikholikov	23 April 1997 (aged 26)	11	1	(Kazakhstan Football Federation) Ordabasy
18	DF	Abdulla Abdullaev	1 September 1997 (aged 26)	14	0	(United Arab Emirates Football Association) Khor Fakkan
19	MF	Azizbek Turgunboev	1 October 1994 (aged 29)	24	2	(Uzbekistan Football Association) Pakhtakor Tashkent
20	MF	Khojimat Erkinov	29 May 2001 (aged 22)	19	3	(Russian Football Union) Torpedo Moscow
21	FW	Igor Sergeyev	30 April 1993 (aged 30)	70	18	(Football Association of Thailand) BG Pathum United
22	MF	Abbosbek Fayzullaev	3 October 2003 (aged 20)	7	1	(Russian Football Union) CSKA Moscow
23	MF	Shokhboz Umarov	9 March 1999 (aged 24)	4	0	(Kazakhstan Football Federation) Ordabasy
24	FW	Azizbek Amonov	30 October 1997 (aged 26)	3	1	(Uzbekistan Football Association) Nasaf
25	DF	Abdukodir Khusanov	29 February 2004 (aged 19)	7	0	(French Football Federation) Lens
26	DF	Zafarmurod Abdurakhmatov	28 April 2003 (aged 20)	0	0	(Uzbekistan Football Association) Nasaf

=== Syria ===
Syria announced a 33-men preliminary squad on 20 December 2023. The final squad was announced on 31 December. On 2 January 2024, Mardik Mardikian withdrew injured and was replaced by Alaa Al Dali. On 4 January, Mohammed Osman withdrew injured and was replaced by Mouhamad Anez. On 10 January, Mohammad Al Hallak withdrew injured and was replaced by Mohammad Al Marmour.

Coach: (Argentina) Héctor Cúper

No.	Pos.	Player	Date of birth (age)	Caps	Goals	Club
1	GK	Ibrahim Alma (captain)	18 October 1991 (aged 32)	79	0	(Syrian Football Association) Tishreen
2	DF	Aiham Ousou	9 January 2000 (aged 24)	0	0	(Swedish Football Association) BK Häcken
3	DF	Moayad Ajan	16 February 1993 (aged 30)	65	1	(Syrian Football Association) Al-Jaish
4	MF	Ezequiel Ham	10 January 1994 (aged 30)	3	0	(Argentine Football Association) Independiente Rivadavia
5	DF	Omar Midani	26 January 1994 (aged 29)	60	1	(Kuwait Football Association) Al-Nasr
6	DF	Amro Jenyat	15 January 1993 (aged 30)	44	1	(Syrian Football Association) Al-Wahda
7	FW	Omar Khribin	15 January 1994 (aged 29)	55	22	(United Arab Emirates Football Association) Al-Wahda
8	MF	Kamel Hmeisheh	23 July 1998 (aged 25)	27	0	(Bahrain Football Association) Al-Ahli
9	FW	Alaa Al Dali	3 January 1997 (aged 27)	18	2	(Iraq Football Association) Naft Missan
10	MF	Mohammad Al Marmour	4 January 1995 (aged 29)	34	4	(Lebanese Football Association) Al-Ahed
11	FW	Pablo Sabbag	11 June 1997 (aged 26)	0	0	(Peruvian Football Federation) Alianza Lima
12	MF	Ammar Ramadan	5 January 2001 (aged 23)	7	0	(Slovak Football Association) Dunajská Streda
13	DF	Thaer Krouma	2 February 1990 (aged 33)	33	1	(Syrian Football Association) Al-Fotuwa
14	MF	Mouhamad Anez	14 May 1995 (aged 28)	28	1	(Bahrain Football Association) Al-Riffa
15	DF	Khaled Kurdaghli	31 January 1997 (aged 26)	25	0	(Jordan Football Association) Al-Wehdat
16	MF	Elmar Abraham	1 March 1999 (aged 24)	1	0	(Swedish Football Association) Skövde AIK
17	MF	Fahd Youssef	15 May 1987 (aged 36)	39	7	(Iraq Football Association) Al-Shorta
18	MF	Jalil Elías	25 April 1996 (aged 27)	0	0	(Argentine Football Association) San Lorenzo
19	DF	Muayad Al Khouli	16 October 1993 (aged 30)	14	0	(Syrian Football Association) Al-Jaish
20	FW	Antonio Yakoub	12 June 2002 (aged 21)	0	0	(Swedish Football Association) Gefle IF
21	MF	Ibrahim Hesar	15 November 1993 (aged 30)	3	0	(Argentine Football Association) Belgrano
22	GK	Ahmad Madania	1 January 1990 (aged 34)	22	0	(Syrian Football Association) Jableh
23	GK	Taha Mosa	24 May 1987 (aged 36)	6	0	(Syrian Football Association) Al-Fotuwa
24	DF	Abdul Rahman Weiss	14 June 1998 (aged 25)	13	0	(Hellenic Football Federation) Athens Kallithea
25	FW	Mahmoud Al Aswad	14 September 2003 (aged 20)	1	0	(Syrian Football Association) Al-Karamah
26	GK	Maksim Sarraf	15 March 2005 (aged 18)	0	0	(Russian Football Union) CSKA Moscow

=== India ===
India announced a 50-men preliminary squad on 12 December 2023. The final squad was announced on 30 December.

Coach: (Croatia) Igor Štimac

No.	Pos.	Player	Date of birth (age)	Caps	Goals	Club
1	GK	Gurpreet Singh Sandhu	3 February 1992 (aged 31)	66	0	(All India Football Federation) Bengaluru
2	DF	Rahul Bheke	6 December 1990 (aged 33)	24	1	(All India Football Federation) Mumbai City
3	DF	Subhasish Bose	18 August 1995 (aged 28)	35	0	(All India Football Federation) Mohun Bagan
4	DF	Lalchungnunga	25 December 2000 (aged 23)	1	0	(All India Football Federation) East Bengal
5	DF	Sandesh Jhingan	21 July 1993 (aged 30)	60	5	(All India Football Federation) Goa
6	DF	Akash Mishra	27 November 2001 (aged 22)	24	0	(All India Football Federation) Mumbai City
7	MF	Anirudh Thapa	15 January 1998 (aged 25)	53	4	(All India Football Federation) Mohun Bagan
8	MF	Suresh Singh Wangjam	7 August 2000 (aged 23)	22	1	(All India Football Federation) Bengaluru
9	FW	Manvir Singh	7 November 1995 (aged 28)	37	7	(All India Football Federation) Mohun Bagan
10	MF	Brandon Fernandes	20 September 1994 (aged 29)	22	0	(All India Football Federation) Goa
11	FW	Sunil Chhetri (captain)	3 August 1984 (aged 39)	145	93	(All India Football Federation) Bengaluru
12	MF	Liston Colaco	12 November 1998 (aged 25)	18	0	(All India Football Federation) Mohun Bagan
13	GK	Vishal Kaith	22 July 1996 (aged 27)	4	0	(All India Football Federation) Mohun Bagan
14	MF	Naorem Mahesh Singh	1 March 1999 (aged 24)	16	3	(All India Football Federation) East Bengal
15	MF	Udanta Singh Kumam	14 June 1996 (aged 27)	48	2	(All India Football Federation) Goa
16	MF	Rahul K. P.	16 February 2000 (aged 23)	6	0	(All India Football Federation) Kerala Blasters
17	MF	Lallianzuala Chhangte	8 June 1997 (aged 26)	32	7	(All India Football Federation) Mumbai City
18	MF	Sahal Abdul Samad	1 April 1997 (aged 26)	35	3	(All India Football Federation) Mohun Bagan
19	MF	Lalengmawia Ralte	17 October 2000 (aged 23)	13	0	(All India Football Federation) Mumbai City
20	DF	Pritam Kotal	8 September 1993 (aged 30)	52	0	(All India Football Federation) Kerala Blasters
21	DF	Nikhil Poojary	3 September 1995 (aged 28)	21	1	(All India Football Federation) Hyderabad
22	DF	Mehtab Singh	5 May 1998 (aged 25)	8	0	(All India Football Federation) Mumbai City
23	GK	Amrinder Singh	27 May 1993 (aged 30)	13	0	(All India Football Federation) Odisha
24	FW	Vikram Partap Singh	16 January 2002 (aged 21)	0	0	(All India Football Federation) Mumbai City
25	MF	Deepak Tangri	1 February 1999 (aged 24)	0	0	(All India Football Federation) Mohun Bagan
26	FW	Ishan Pandita	26 May 1998 (aged 25)	7	1	(All India Football Federation) Kerala Blasters

== Group C ==
=== Iran ===
Iran announced a 27-men preliminary squad on 31 December 2023. The final squad was announced on 2 January 2024.

Coach: Amir Ghalenoei

No.	Pos.	Player	Date of birth (age)	Caps	Goals	Club
1	GK	Alireza Beiranvand	21 September 1992 (aged 31)	63	0	(Football Federation Islamic Republic of Iran) Persepolis
2	DF	Sadegh Moharrami	1 March 1996 (aged 27)	28	1	(Croatian Football Federation) Dinamo Zagreb
3	DF	Ehsan Hajsafi (captain)	25 February 1990 (aged 33)	137	7	(Hellenic Football Federation) AEK Athens
4	DF	Shojae Khalilzadeh	14 May 1989 (aged 34)	34	1	(Football Federation Islamic Republic of Iran) Tractor
5	DF	Milad Mohammadi	29 September 1993 (aged 30)	54	1	(Hellenic Football Federation) AEK Athens
6	MF	Saeid Ezatolahi	1 October 1996 (aged 27)	60	1	(Danish Football Association) Vejle
7	MF	Alireza Jahanbakhsh	11 August 1993 (aged 30)	76	15	(Royal Dutch Football Association) Feyenoord
8	MF	Omid Ebrahimi	15 September 1987 (aged 36)	58	1	(Qatar Football Association) Al-Shamal
9	FW	Mehdi Taremi	18 July 1992 (aged 31)	77	43	(Portuguese Football Federation) Porto
10	FW	Karim Ansarifard	3 April 1990 (aged 33)	100	29	(Cyprus Football Association) Omonia
11	FW	Reza Asadi	17 January 1996 (aged 27)	8	1	(Football Federation Islamic Republic of Iran) Sepahan
12	GK	Payam Niazmand	6 April 1995 (aged 28)	8	0	(Football Federation Islamic Republic of Iran) Sepahan
13	DF	Hossein Kanaanizadegan	23 March 1994 (aged 29)	46	4	(Football Federation Islamic Republic of Iran) Persepolis
14	MF	Saman Ghoddos	6 September 1993 (aged 30)	42	3	(The Football Association) Brentford
15	MF	Rouzbeh Cheshmi	24 July 1993 (aged 30)	31	3	(Football Federation Islamic Republic of Iran) Esteghlal
16	MF	Mehdi Torabi	10 September 1994 (aged 29)	47	7	(Football Federation Islamic Republic of Iran) Persepolis
17	MF	Ali Gholizadeh	10 March 1996 (aged 27)	32	6	(Polish Football Association) Lech Poznań
18	FW	Mehdi Ghayedi	5 December 1998 (aged 25)	12	4	(United Arab Emirates Football Association) Ittihad Kalba
19	DF	Majid Hosseini	20 June 1996 (aged 27)	26	0	(Turkish Football Federation) Kayserispor
20	FW	Sardar Azmoun	1 January 1995 (aged 29)	75	49	(Italian Football Federation) Roma
21	MF	Mohammad Mohebi	20 December 1998 (aged 25)	15	4	(Russian Football Union) Rostov
22	GK	Hossein Hosseini	30 June 1992 (aged 31)	10	0	(Football Federation Islamic Republic of Iran) Esteghlal
23	MF	Ramin Rezaeian	21 March 1990 (aged 33)	58	6	(Football Federation Islamic Republic of Iran) Sepahan
24	DF	Arya Yousefi	22 April 2002 (aged 21)	2	0	(Football Federation Islamic Republic of Iran) Sepahan
25	DF	Saman Fallah	12 May 2001 (aged 22)	2	0	(Football Federation Islamic Republic of Iran) Gol Gohar
26	FW	Shahriyar Moghanlou	21 December 1994 (aged 29)	6	2	(Football Federation Islamic Republic of Iran) Sepahan

=== United Arab Emirates ===
United Arab Emirates announced a 31-men preliminary squad on 22 December 2023. The final squad was announced on 4 January 2024. On 13 January, Khaled Tawhid withdrew injured and was replaced by Hassan Hamza.

Coach: (Portugal) Paulo Bento

No.	Pos.	Player	Date of birth (age)	Caps	Goals	Club
1	GK	Ali Khasif	9 June 1987 (aged 36)	71	0	(United Arab Emirates Football Association) Al-Jazira
2	DF	Abdulla Idrees	16 August 1999 (aged 24)	7	0	(United Arab Emirates Football Association) Al-Jazira
3	DF	Zayed Sultan	11 April 2001 (aged 22)	3	0	(United Arab Emirates Football Association) Al-Jazira
4	DF	Khalid Al-Hashemi	18 March 1997 (aged 26)	9	0	(United Arab Emirates Football Association) Al-Ain
5	MF	Ali Salmeen	4 February 1995 (aged 28)	56	3	(United Arab Emirates Football Association) Al-Wasl
6	MF	Majid Rashid	16 May 2000 (aged 23)	13	0	(United Arab Emirates Football Association) Sharjah
7	FW	Ali Mabkhout (captain)	5 October 1990 (aged 33)	113	84	(United Arab Emirates Football Association) Al-Jazira
8	MF	Tahnoon Al-Zaabi	10 April 1999 (aged 24)	22	1	(United Arab Emirates Football Association) Al-Wahda
9	FW	Ali Saleh	22 January 2000 (aged 23)	32	3	(United Arab Emirates Football Association) Al-Wasl
10	FW	Fábio Lima	30 June 1993 (aged 30)	23	10	(United Arab Emirates Football Association) Al-Wasl
11	FW	Caio Canedo	9 August 1990 (aged 33)	36	9	(United Arab Emirates Football Association) Al-Wasl
12	DF	Khalifa Al Hammadi	7 November 1998 (aged 25)	37	1	(United Arab Emirates Football Association) Al-Jazira
13	DF	Mohammed Al-Attas	5 August 1997 (aged 26)	26	1	(United Arab Emirates Football Association) Al-Jazira
14	MF	Abdulla Hamad	18 September 2001 (aged 22)	8	0	(United Arab Emirates Football Association) Al-Wahda
15	MF	Yahia Nader	11 September 1998 (aged 25)	6	0	(United Arab Emirates Football Association) Al-Ain
16	MF	Mohammed Abbas	30 September 2002 (aged 21)	2	0	(United Arab Emirates Football Association) Al-Ain
17	GK	Khalid Eisa	15 September 1989 (aged 34)	70	0	(United Arab Emirates Football Association) Al-Ain
18	MF	Abdullah Ramadan	7 March 1998 (aged 25)	42	1	(United Arab Emirates Football Association) Al-Jazira
19	DF	Khaled Ibrahim	17 January 1997 (aged 26)	11	0	(United Arab Emirates Football Association) Sharjah
20	FW	Yahya Al-Ghassani	18 April 1998 (aged 25)	12	3	(United Arab Emirates Football Association) Shabab Al-Ahli
21	FW	Harib Abdalla	26 November 2002 (aged 21)	21	2	(United Arab Emirates Football Association) Shabab Al-Ahli
22	GK	Hassan Hamza	10 November 1994 (aged 29)	0	0	(United Arab Emirates Football Association) Shabab Al Ahli
23	FW	Sultan Adil	4 May 2004 (aged 19)	6	1	(United Arab Emirates Football Association) Kalba
24	DF	Ahmed Jamil	16 January 1999 (aged 24)	8	0	(United Arab Emirates Football Association) Shabab Al-Ahli
25	DF	Abdulrahman Saleh	3 June 1999 (aged 24)	0	0	(United Arab Emirates Football Association) Al-Wasl
26	DF	Bader Nasser	16 September 2001 (aged 22)	4	0	(United Arab Emirates Football Association) Shabab Al-Ahli

=== Hong Kong ===
Hong Kong announced a 30-men preliminary squad on 19 December 2023. The final squad was announced on 26 December 2023, with 25 players rather than the allowed 26. On 1 January 2024, Sean Tse was added to the squad.

Coach: (Norway) Jørn Andersen

No.	Pos.	Player	Date of birth (age)	Caps	Goals	Club
1	GK	Yapp Hung Fai (captain)	21 March 1990 (aged 33)	88	0	(Football Association of Hong Kong, China) Eastern
2	DF	Sean Tse	3 May 1992 (aged 31)	8	0	(The Football Association) Radcliffe
3	DF	Oliver Gerbig	12 December 1998 (aged 25)	2	0	(Football Association of Hong Kong, China) Kitchee
4	DF	Vas Nuñez	22 November 1995 (aged 28)	8	0	(Chinese Football Association) Dalian Pro
5	DF	Hélio	31 January 1986 (aged 37)	35	1	(Football Association of Hong Kong, China) Kitchee
6	MF	Wu Chun Ming	21 November 1997 (aged 26)	17	0	(Football Association of Hong Kong, China) Lee Man
7	DF	Law Tsz Chun	2 March 1997 (aged 26)	25	1	(Football Association of Hong Kong, China) Kitchee
8	MF	Tan Chun Lok	15 January 1996 (aged 27)	42	3	(Football Association of Hong Kong, China) Kitchee
9	FW	Matt Orr	1 January 1997 (aged 27)	19	3	(Chinese Football Association) Guangxi Pingguo Haliao
10	MF	Wong Wai	17 September 1992 (aged 31)	43	4	(Football Association of Hong Kong, China) Lee Man
11	FW	Everton Camargo	25 May 1991 (aged 32)	5	4	(Football Association of Hong Kong, China) Lee Man
12	MF	Lam Hin Ting	9 December 1999 (aged 24)	1	0	(Football Association of Hong Kong, China) Rangers
13	DF	Li Ngai Hoi	15 October 1994 (aged 29)	9	0	(Football Association of Hong Kong, China) Rangers
14	FW	Poon Pui Hin	3 October 2000 (aged 23)	7	4	(Football Association of Hong Kong, China) Kitchee
15	MF	Chang Hei Yin	6 April 2000 (aged 23)	4	0	(Football Association of Hong Kong, China) Lee Man
16	MF	Chan Siu Kwan	1 August 1992 (aged 31)	18	3	(Football Association of Hong Kong, China) Tai Po
17	DF	Shinichi Chan	5 September 2002 (aged 21)	11	1	(Football Association of Hong Kong, China) Kitchee
18	GK	Ng Wai Him	30 June 2002 (aged 21)	0	0	(Football Association of Hong Kong, China) Southern
19	GK	Tse Ka Wing	4 September 1999 (aged 24)	5	0	(Football Association of Hong Kong, China) Tai Po
20	FW	Michael Udebuluzor	1 April 2004 (aged 19)	5	2	(German Football Association) FC Ingolstadt
21	DF	Yue Tze Nam	12 May 1998 (aged 25)	17	0	(Chinese Football Association) Meizhou Hakka
22	MF	Yu Joy Yin	8 October 2001 (aged 22)	2	0	(Football Association of Hong Kong, China) Eastern
23	DF	Sun Ming Him	19 June 2000 (aged 23)	23	2	(Football Association of Hong Kong, China) Eastern
24	MF	Ju Yingzhi	24 July 1987 (aged 36)	44	3	(Football Association of Hong Kong, China) Southern
25	FW	Stefan Pereira	16 April 1988 (aged 35)	1	0	(Football Association of Hong Kong, China) Southern
26	FW	Juninho	11 December 1990 (aged 33)	1	0	(Football Association of Hong Kong, China) Kitchee

=== Palestine ===
Palestine announced their final squad on 1 January 2024.

Coach: (Tunisia) Makram Daboub

No.	Pos.	Player	Date of birth (age)	Caps	Goals	Club
1	GK	Amr Kaddoura	1 July 1994 (aged 29)	3	0	(Swedish Football Association) Landskrona BoIS
2	DF	Mohammed Khalil	5 April 1998 (aged 25)	12	0	(Palestinian Football Association) Hilal Al-Quds
3	MF	Mohammed Rashid	3 July 1995 (aged 28)	36	2	(Football Association of Indonesia) Bali United
4	DF	Yaser Hamed	9 December 1997 (aged 26)	26	5	(All India Football Federation) North East United
5	DF	Mohammed Saleh	18 July 1993 (aged 30)	26	0	(Egyptian Football Association) Al-Ittihad Alexandria
6	MF	Oday Kharoub	5 February 1993 (aged 30)	23	0	(Palestinian Football Association) Hilal Al-Quds
7	DF	Musab Al-Battat (captain)	12 November 1993 (aged 30)	56	1	(Palestinian Football Association) Shabab Al-Dhahiriya
8	FW	Alaa Aldeen Hassan	31 January 2000 (aged 23)	2	0	(Israel Football Association) Bnei Sakhnin
9	MF	Tamer Seyam	25 November 1992 (aged 31)	59	12	(Football Association of Thailand) PT Prachuap
10	MF	Mahmoud Abu Warda	31 May 1995 (aged 28)	29	3	(Palestinian Football Association) Markaz Balata
11	FW	Oday Dabbagh	3 December 1998 (aged 25)	29	10	(Royal Belgian Football Association) Charleroi
12	DF	Camilo Saldaña	13 July 1999 (aged 24)	4	0	(Football Federation of Chile) Unión San Felipe
13	FW	Shehab Qunbar	10 August 1997 (aged 26)	1	0	(Palestinian Football Association) Jabal Al-Mukaber
14	MF	Samer Zubaida	26 April 2001 (aged 22)	0	0	(Palestinian Football Association) Hilal Al-Quds
15	DF	Michel Termanini	8 May 1998 (aged 25)	9	1	(Kuwait Football Association) Kazma
16	GK	Naim Abu Aker	20 January 1995 (aged 28)	1	0	(Palestinian Football Association) Shabab Al-Dhahiriya
17	DF	Mousa Farawi	22 March 1998 (aged 25)	14	0	(Palestinian Football Association) Hilal Al-Quds
18	DF	Amid Mahajna	11 November 1996 (aged 27)	1	0	(Israel Football Association) Hapoel Umm al-Fahm
19	FW	Mahmoud Wadi	19 December 1994 (aged 29)	20	0	(Egyptian Football Association) Al-Mokawloon Al-Arab
20	FW	Zaid Qunbar	4 September 2002 (aged 21)	2	0	(Palestinian Football Association) Jabal Al-Mukaber
21	MF	Islam Batran	1 October 1994 (aged 29)	27	5	(Palestinian Football Association) Hilal Al-Quds
22	GK	Rami Hamadeh	24 March 1994 (aged 29)	42	0	(Palestinian Football Association) Jabal Al Mukaber
23	MF	Ataa Jaber	3 October 1994 (aged 29)	6	0	(Association of Football Federations of Azerbaijan) Neftchi Baku
24	DF	Mahdi Issa	3 November 1998 (aged 25)	0	0	(Palestinian Football Association) Jabal Al-Mukaber
25	DF	Samer Jundi	27 September 1996 (aged 27)	7	0	(Palestinian Football Association) Hilal Al-Quds
26	GK	Baraa Kharoub	20 March 1998 (aged 25)	0	0	(Palestinian Football Association) Markaz Balata

== Group D ==
=== Japan ===
Japan announced their final squad on 1 January 2024.

Coach: Hajime Moriyasu

No.	Pos.	Player	Date of birth (age)	Caps	Goals	Club
1	GK	Daiya Maekawa	8 September 1994 (aged 29)	1	0	(Japan Football Association) Vissel Kobe
2	DF	Yukinari Sugawara	28 June 2000 (aged 23)	9	1	(Royal Dutch Football Association) AZ
3	DF	Shōgo Taniguchi	15 July 1991 (aged 32)	24	1	(Qatar Football Association) Al-Rayyan
4	DF	Kō Itakura	27 January 1997 (aged 26)	22	1	(German Football Association) Borussia Mönchengladbach
5	MF	Hidemasa Morita	10 May 1995 (aged 28)	28	2	(Portuguese Football Federation) Sporting CP
6	MF	Wataru Endō (captain)	9 February 1993 (aged 30)	55	2	(The Football Association) Liverpool
7	MF	Kaoru Mitoma	20 May 1997 (aged 26)	18	7	(The Football Association) Brighton & Hove Albion
8	MF	Takumi Minamino	16 January 1995 (aged 28)	52	18	(French Football Federation) Monaco
9	FW	Ayase Ueda	28 August 1998 (aged 25)	19	7	(Royal Dutch Football Association) Feyenoord
10	MF	Ritsu Dōan	16 June 1998 (aged 25)	42	7	(German Football Association) SC Freiburg
11	FW	Mao Hosoya	7 September 2001 (aged 22)	4	1	(Japan Football Association) Kashiwa Reysol
12	GK	Taishi Brandon Nozawa	25 December 2002 (aged 21)	0	0	(Japan Football Association) FC Tokyo
13	MF	Keito Nakamura	28 July 2000 (aged 23)	5	5	(French Football Federation) Reims
14	MF	Junya Itō	9 March 1993 (aged 30)	51	13	(French Football Federation) Reims
15	DF	Kōki Machida	25 August 1997 (aged 26)	6	0	(Royal Belgian Football Association) Union Saint-Gilloise
16	DF	Seiya Maikuma	16 October 1997 (aged 26)	4	0	(Japan Football Association) Cerezo Osaka
17	MF	Reo Hatate	21 November 1997 (aged 26)	5	0	(Scottish Football Association) Celtic
18	FW	Takuma Asano	10 November 1994 (aged 29)	48	9	(German Football Association) VfL Bochum
19	DF	Yūta Nakayama	16 February 1997 (aged 26)	20	0	(The Football Association) Huddersfield Town
20	MF	Takefusa Kubo	4 June 2001 (aged 22)	29	3	(Royal Spanish Football Federation) Real Sociedad
21	DF	Hiroki Itō	12 May 1999 (aged 24)	13	1	(German Football Association) VfB Stuttgart
22	DF	Takehiro Tomiyasu	5 November 1998 (aged 25)	37	1	(The Football Association) Arsenal
23	GK	Zion Suzuki	21 August 2002 (aged 21)	4	0	(Royal Belgian Football Association) Sint-Truiden
24	DF	Tsuyoshi Watanabe	5 February 1997 (aged 26)	2	0	(Royal Belgian Football Association) Gent
25	FW	Daizen Maeda	20 October 1997 (aged 26)	13	3	(Scottish Football Association) Celtic
26	MF	Kaishū Sano	30 December 2000 (aged 23)	2	0	(Japan Football Association) Kashima Antlers

=== Indonesia ===
Indonesia announced a 29-men preliminary squad on 19 December 2023. The squad was reduced to 28 players on 20 December as Yance Sayuri withdrew injured. The final squad was announced on 4 January 2024. On 11 January, Saddil Ramdani was replaced by Adam Alis. On 14 January, Syahrul Trisna withdrew injured and was replaced by Nadeo Argawinata.

Coach: (South Korea) Shin Tae-yong

No.	Pos.	Player	Date of birth (age)	Caps	Goals	Club
1	GK	Muhammad Riyandi	3 January 2000 (aged 24)	5	0	(Football Association of Indonesia) Persis Solo
2	MF	Yakob Sayuri	22 September 1997 (aged 26)	14	2	(Football Association of Indonesia) PSM Makassar
3	DF	Elkan Baggott	23 October 2002 (aged 21)	19	2	(The Football Association) Ipswich Town
4	DF	Jordi Amat	21 March 1992 (aged 31)	10	1	(Football Association of Malaysia) Johor Darul Ta'zim
5	DF	Rizky Ridho	21 November 2001 (aged 22)	27	3	(Football Association of Indonesia) Persija Jakarta
6	DF	Sandy Walsh	14 March 1995 (aged 28)	4	0	(Royal Belgian Football Association) Mechelen
7	MF	Marselino Ferdinan	9 September 2004 (aged 19)	14	2	(Royal Belgian Football Association) Deinze
8	MF	Witan Sulaeman	8 October 2001 (aged 22)	35	9	(Football Association of Indonesia) Bhayangkara
9	FW	Dimas Drajad	30 March 1997 (aged 26)	11	6	(Football Association of Indonesia) Persikabo 1973
10	MF	Egy Maulana Vikri	7 July 2000 (aged 23)	21	8	(Football Association of Indonesia) Dewa United
11	FW	Rafael Struick	27 March 2003 (aged 20)	4	0	(Royal Dutch Football Association) ADO Den Haag
12	DF	Pratama Arhan	21 December 2001 (aged 22)	36	3	(Japan Football Association) Tokyo Verdy
13	DF	Edo Febriansah	25 July 1997 (aged 26)	13	0	(Football Association of Indonesia) Persib Bandung
14	DF	Asnawi Mangkualam (captain)	4 October 1999 (aged 24)	36	1	(Korea Football Association) Jeonnam Dragons
15	MF	Ricky Kambuaya	5 May 1996 (aged 27)	32	5	(Football Association of Indonesia) Dewa United
16	FW	Hokky Caraka	21 August 2004 (aged 19)	3	2	(Football Association of Indonesia) PSS Sleman
17	MF	Adam Alis	19 December 1993 (aged 30)	9	1	(Football Association of Indonesia) Borneo Samarinda
18	FW	Ramadhan Sananta	27 November 2002 (aged 21)	7	4	(Football Association of Indonesia) Persis Solo
19	DF	Wahyu Prasetyo	21 March 1998 (aged 25)	1	0	(Football Association of Indonesia) PSIS Semarang
20	DF	Shayne Pattynama	11 August 1998 (aged 25)	5	1	(Norwegian Football Federation) Viking
21	GK	Ernando Ari	27 February 2002 (aged 21)	5	0	(Football Association of Indonesia) Persebaya Surabaya
22	FW	Dendy Sulistyawan	12 October 1996 (aged 27)	16	5	(Football Association of Indonesia) Bhayangkara
23	MF	Marc Klok	20 April 1993 (aged 30)	18	4	(Football Association of Indonesia) Persib Bandung
24	MF	Ivar Jenner	10 January 2004 (aged 20)	2	0	(Royal Dutch Football Association) Utrecht
25	DF	Justin Hubner	14 September 2003 (aged 20)	0	0	(The Football Association) Wolverhampton Wanderers
26	GK	Nadeo Argawinata	9 March 1997 (aged 26)	24	0	(Football Association of Indonesia) Borneo Samarinda

=== Iraq ===
Iraq announced their final squad on 27 December 2023. On 1 January 2024, Amjad Attwan withdrew injured and was replaced by Akam Hashim.

Coach: (Spain) Jesús Casas

No.	Pos.	Player	Date of birth (age)	Caps	Goals	Club
1	GK	Fahad Talib	21 October 1994 (aged 29)	19	0	(Football Federation Islamic Republic of Iran) Sanat Naft Abadan
2	DF	Rebin Sulaka	12 April 1992 (aged 31)	34	0	(Swedish Football Association) IF Brommapojkarna
3	DF	Hussein Ali	1 March 2002 (aged 21)	4	0	(Royal Dutch Football Association) Heerenveen
4	DF	Saad Natiq	19 March 1994 (aged 29)	33	0	(Saudi Arabian Football Federation) Abha
5	DF	Frans Putros	14 July 1993 (aged 30)	14	0	(Football Association of Thailand) Port
6	DF	Ali Adnan	19 December 1993 (aged 30)	90	7	(Football Federation Islamic Republic of Iran) Mes Rafsanjan
7	MF	Youssef Amyn	21 August 2003 (aged 20)	2	1	(German Football Association) Eintracht Braunschweig
8	MF	Ibrahim Bayesh	1 May 2000 (aged 23)	46	6	(Iraq Football Association) Al-Quwa Al-Jawiya
9	FW	Ali Al-Hamadi	1 March 2002 (aged 21)	11	3	(The Football Association) AFC Wimbledon
10	FW	Mohanad Ali	20 June 2000 (aged 23)	40	18	(Iraq Football Association) Al-Shorta
11	MF	Zidane Iqbal	27 April 2003 (aged 20)	4	0	(Royal Dutch Football Association) Utrecht
12	GK	Jalal Hassan (captain)	18 May 1991 (aged 32)	75	0	(Iraq Football Association) Al-Zawraa
13	MF	Bashar Resan	22 December 1996 (aged 27)	59	4	(Qatar Football Association) Qatar SC
14	MF	Akam Hashim	16 August 1998 (aged 25)	0	0	(Iraq Football Association) Erbil
15	DF	Allan Mohideen	11 November 1993 (aged 30)	2	0	(Swedish Football Association) Utsiktens BK
16	MF	Amir Al-Ammari	27 July 1997 (aged 26)	23	1	(Swedish Football Association) Halmstads BK
17	MF	Ali Jasim	20 January 2004 (aged 19)	4	0	(Iraq Football Association) Al-Quwa Al-Jawiya
18	FW	Aymen Hussein	22 March 1996 (aged 27)	68	17	(Iraq Football Association) Al-Quwa Al-Jawiya
19	MF	Danilo Al-Saed	24 February 1999 (aged 24)	2	0	(Norwegian Football Federation) Sandefjord
20	MF	Osama Rashid	17 January 1992 (aged 31)	29	1	(Portuguese Football Federation) Vizela
21	MF	Ahmad Allée	29 April 1996 (aged 27)	3	0	(French Football Federation) Rouen
22	GK	Ahmed Basil	19 August 1996 (aged 27)	4	0	(Iraq Football Association) Al-Shorta
23	DF	Merchas Doski	7 December 1999 (aged 24)	9	0	(Football Association of the Czech Republic) Slovácko
24	DF	Zaid Tahseen	29 January 2001 (aged 22)	4	0	(Iraq Football Association) Al-Talaba
25	DF	Ahmed Yahya	1 July 1995 (aged 28)	3	0	(Iraq Football Association) Al-Shorta
26	MF	Montader Madjed	24 April 2005 (aged 18)	0	0	(Swedish Football Association) Hammarby IF

=== Vietnam ===
Vietnam announced a 34-men preliminary squad on 25 December 2023. Phạm Văn Luân was added to the squad on 28 December. Nguyễn Thành Chung and Hoàng Văn Toản withdrew injured on 29 December and were replaced by Bùi Tiến Dũng and Hồ Tấn Tài. On 31 December, Đặng Văn Lâm, Bùi Tiến Dũng, Nguyễn Đức Chiến and Nguyễn Thanh Nhàn withdrew injured. On 3 January 2024, Quế Ngọc Hải and Nguyễn Tiến Linh withdrew injured. The final squad was announced on 4 January. On the same day, Nguyễn Hoàng Đức withdrew injured and was replaced by Nguyễn Văn Trường. On 12 January, Triệu Việt Hưng was replaced by Lê Ngọc Bảo.

Coach: (France) Philippe Troussier

No.	Pos.	Player	Date of birth (age)	Caps	Goals	Club
1	GK	Nguyễn Filip	14 September 1992 (aged 31)	1	0	(Vietnam Football Federation) Cong An Hanoi
2	DF	Đỗ Duy Mạnh	29 September 1996 (aged 27)	55	1	(Vietnam Football Federation) Hanoi FC
3	DF	Võ Minh Trọng	24 October 2001 (aged 22)	5	0	(Vietnam Football Federation) Becamex Binh Duong
4	DF	Hồ Tấn Tài	6 November 1997 (aged 26)	24	4	(Vietnam Football Federation) Cong An Hanoi
5	DF	Giáp Tuấn Dương	7 September 2002 (aged 21)	4	0	(Vietnam Football Federation) Cong An Hanoi
6	DF	Nguyễn Thanh Bình	2 November 2000 (aged 23)	17	1	(Vietnam Football Federation) The Cong-Viettel
7	MF	Phạm Xuân Mạnh	27 March 1996 (aged 27)	6	0	(Vietnam Football Federation) Hanoi FC
8	MF	Đỗ Hùng Dũng (captain)	8 September 1993 (aged 30)	38	1	(Vietnam Football Federation) Hanoi FC
9	FW	Nguyễn Văn Toàn	12 April 1996 (aged 27)	58	7	(Vietnam Football Federation) Thep Xanh Nam Dinh
10	FW	Phạm Tuấn Hải	19 May 1998 (aged 25)	25	4	(Vietnam Football Federation) Hanoi FC
11	MF	Nguyễn Tuấn Anh	16 May 1995 (aged 28)	41	1	(Vietnam Football Federation) LPBank Hoang Anh Gia Lai
12	DF	Phan Tuấn Tài	7 January 2001 (aged 23)	9	0	(Vietnam Football Federation) The Cong-Viettel
13	MF	Trương Tiến Anh	25 April 1999 (aged 24)	7	1	(Vietnam Football Federation) The Cong-Viettel
14	FW	Nguyễn Văn Trường	9 October 2003 (aged 20)	1	0	(Vietnam Football Federation) Hanoi FC
15	FW	Nguyễn Đình Bắc	19 August 2004 (aged 19)	6	1	(Vietnam Football Federation) Quang Nam
16	MF	Nguyễn Thái Sơn	13 July 2003 (aged 20)	7	0	(Vietnam Football Federation) Dong A Thanh Hoa
17	DF	Vũ Văn Thanh	14 April 1996 (aged 27)	45	5	(Vietnam Football Federation) Cong An Hanoi
18	MF	Nguyễn Hai Long	27 August 2000 (aged 23)	2	0	(Vietnam Football Federation) Hanoi FC
19	MF	Nguyễn Quang Hải	12 April 1997 (aged 26)	57	10	(Vietnam Football Federation) Cong An Hanoi
20	DF	Bùi Hoàng Việt Anh	1 January 1999 (aged 25)	16	0	(Vietnam Football Federation) Cong An Hanoi
21	GK	Nguyễn Đình Triệu	4 November 1991 (aged 32)	3	0	(Vietnam Football Federation) Haiphong
22	FW	Khuất Văn Khang	11 May 2003 (aged 20)	9	1	(Vietnam Football Federation) The Cong-Viettel
23	GK	Nguyễn Văn Việt	12 July 2002 (aged 21)	1	0	(Vietnam Football Federation) Song Lam Nghe An
24	FW	Nguyễn Văn Tùng	2 June 2001 (aged 22)	4	0	(Vietnam Football Federation) Hanoi FC
25	MF	Lê Phạm Thành Long	5 June 1996 (aged 27)	2	0	(Vietnam Football Federation) Cong An Hanoi
26	DF	Lê Ngọc Bảo	27 March 1998 (aged 25)	1	0	(Vietnam Football Federation) Quy Nhon Binh Dinh

== Group E ==
=== South Korea ===
South Korea announced their final squad on 28 December 2023.

Coach: (Germany) Jürgen Klinsmann

No.	Pos.	Player	Date of birth (age)	Caps	Goals	Club
1	GK	Kim Seung-gyu	30 September 1990 (aged 33)	79	0	(Saudi Arabian Football Federation) Al-Shabab
2	DF	Lee Ki-je	9 July 1991 (aged 32)	11	0	(Korea Football Association) Suwon Samsung Bluewings
3	DF	Kim Jin-su	13 June 1992 (aged 31)	69	2	(Korea Football Association) Jeonbuk Hyundai Motors
4	DF	Kim Min-jae	15 November 1996 (aged 27)	55	4	(German Football Association) Bayern Munich
5	MF	Park Yong-woo	10 September 1993 (aged 30)	7	0	(United Arab Emirates Football Association) Al-Ain
6	MF	Hwang In-beom	20 September 1996 (aged 27)	49	5	(Football Association of Serbia) Red Star Belgrade
7	FW	Son Heung-min (captain)	8 July 1992 (aged 31)	116	41	(The Football Association) Tottenham Hotspur
8	MF	Hong Hyun-seok	16 June 1999 (aged 24)	4	0	(Royal Belgian Football Association) Gent
9	FW	Cho Gue-sung	25 January 1998 (aged 25)	30	8	(Danish Football Association) Midtjylland
10	MF	Lee Jae-sung	10 August 1992 (aged 31)	77	9	(German Football Association) Mainz 05
11	FW	Hwang Hee-chan	26 January 1996 (aged 27)	59	12	(The Football Association) Wolverhampton Wanderers
12	GK	Song Bum-keun	15 October 1997 (aged 26)	1	0	(Japan Football Association) Shonan Bellmare
13	MF	Lee Soon-min	22 May 1994 (aged 29)	4	0	(Korea Football Association) Gwangju
14	MF	Moon Seon-min	9 June 1992 (aged 31)	16	2	(Korea Football Association) Jeonbuk Hyundai Motors
15	DF	Jung Seung-hyun	3 April 1994 (aged 29)	19	1	(Korea Football Association) Ulsan HD
16	MF	Park Jin-seob	23 October 1995 (aged 28)	1	0	(Korea Football Association) Jeonbuk Hyundai Motors
17	MF	Jeong Woo-yeong	20 September 1999 (aged 24)	15	3	(German Football Association) VfB Stuttgart
18	MF	Lee Kang-in	19 February 2001 (aged 22)	18	4	(French Football Federation) Paris Saint-Germain
19	DF	Kim Young-gwon	27 February 1990 (aged 33)	103	7	(Korea Football Association) Ulsan HD
20	FW	Oh Hyeon-gyu	12 April 2001 (aged 22)	7	0	(Scottish Football Association) Celtic
21	GK	Jo Hyeon-woo	25 September 1991 (aged 32)	24	0	(Korea Football Association) Ulsan HD
22	DF	Seol Young-woo	5 December 1998 (aged 25)	7	0	(Korea Football Association) Ulsan HD
23	DF	Kim Tae-hwan	24 July 1989 (aged 34)	24	0	(Korea Football Association) Ulsan HD
24	DF	Kim Ju-sung	12 December 2000 (aged 23)	2	0	(Korea Football Association) Seoul
25	DF	Kim Ji-soo	24 December 2004 (aged 19)	0	0	(The Football Association) Brentford
26	MF	Yang Hyun-jun	25 May 2002 (aged 21)	1	0	(Scottish Football Association) Celtic

=== Malaysia ===
Malaysia announced their final squad on 19 December 2023.

Coach: (South Korea) Kim Pan-gon

No.	Pos.	Player	Date of birth (age)	Caps	Goals	Club
1	GK	Azri Ghani	30 April 1999 (aged 24)	0	0	(Football Association of Malaysia) Kuala Lumpur City
2	DF	Matthew Davies (captain)	7 February 1995 (aged 28)	47	0	(Football Association of Malaysia) Johor Darul Ta'zim
3	DF	Shahrul Saad	8 July 1993 (aged 30)	54	5	(Football Association of Malaysia) Johor Darul Ta'zim
4	DF	Daniel Ting	1 December 1992 (aged 31)	4	1	(Football Association of Malaysia) Sabah
5	DF	Syahmi Safari	5 February 1998 (aged 25)	26	1	(Football Association of Malaysia) Johor Darul Ta'zim
6	DF	Dominic Tan	12 March 1997 (aged 26)	24	0	(Football Association of Malaysia) Sabah
7	FW	Faisal Halim	7 January 1998 (aged 26)	29	14	(Football Association of Malaysia) Selangor
8	MF	Stuart Wilkin	12 March 1998 (aged 25)	16	4	(Football Association of Malaysia) Sabah
9	FW	Darren Lok	14 December 1990 (aged 33)	30	6	(Football Association of Malaysia) Sabah
10	MF	Endrick	7 March 1995 (aged 28)	9	0	(Football Association of Malaysia) Johor Darul Ta'zim
11	FW	Safawi Rasid	5 March 1997 (aged 26)	58	20	(Football Association of Malaysia) Johor Darul Ta'zim
12	FW	Arif Aiman Hanapi	4 May 2002 (aged 21)	23	6	(Football Association of Malaysia) Johor Darul Ta'zim
13	FW	Mohamadou Sumareh	20 September 1994 (aged 29)	31	7	(Football Association of Malaysia) Johor Darul Ta'zim
14	MF	Syamer Kutty Abba	1 October 1997 (aged 26)	32	1	(Football Association of Malaysia) Johor Darul Ta'zim
15	DF	Junior Eldstål	16 September 1991 (aged 32)	21	0	(Football Association of Indonesia) Dewa United
16	GK	Syihan Hazmi	22 February 1996 (aged 27)	18	0	(Football Association of Malaysia) Johor Darul Ta'zim
17	FW	Paulo Josué	13 March 1989 (aged 34)	8	4	(Football Association of Malaysia) Kuala Lumpur City
18	MF	Brendan Gan	3 June 1988 (aged 35)	34	1	(Football Association of Malaysia) Selangor
19	FW	Akhyar Rashid	1 May 1999 (aged 24)	46	10	(Football Association of Malaysia) Johor Darul Ta'zim
20	MF	Afiq Fazail	29 September 1994 (aged 29)	5	0	(Football Association of Malaysia) Johor Darul Ta'zim
21	DF	Dion Cools	4 June 1996 (aged 27)	21	4	(Football Association of Thailand) Buriram United
22	DF	La'Vere Corbin-Ong	22 April 1991 (aged 32)	31	4	(Football Association of Malaysia) Johor Darul Ta'zim
23	GK	Sikh Izhan	22 March 2002 (aged 21)	1	0	(Football Association of Malaysia) Negeri Sembilan
24	MF	Natxo Insa	9 June 1986 (aged 37)	1	0	(Football Association of Malaysia) Johor Darul Ta'zim
25	DF	Khuzaimi Piee	11 November 1993 (aged 30)	9	0	(Football Association of Malaysia) Selangor
26	FW	Romel Morales	23 August 1997 (aged 26)	0	0	(Football Association of Malaysia) Kuala Lumpur City

=== Jordan ===
Jordan announced a 30-men preliminary squad on 20 December 2023. The final squad was announced on 31 December 2023.

Coach: (Morocco) Hussein Ammouta

No.	Pos.	Player	Date of birth (age)	Caps	Goals	Club
1	GK	Yazid Abu Layla	8 January 1993 (aged 31)	35	0	(Saudi Arabian Football Federation) Al-Jabalain
2	DF	Mohammad Abu Hasheesh	9 May 1995 (aged 28)	26	0	(Lebanese Football Association) Al-Ahed
3	DF	Abdallah Nasib	25 February 1994 (aged 29)	28	2	(Jordan Football Association) Al-Hussein
4	DF	Bara' Marei	15 April 1994 (aged 29)	12	0	(Jordan Football Association) Al-Faisaly
5	DF	Yazan Al-Arab	31 January 1996 (aged 27)	50	1	(Iraq Football Association) Al-Shorta
6	MF	Mohannad Abu Taha	2 February 2003 (aged 20)	2	0	(Jordan Football Association) Al-Wehdat
7	MF	Mohammad Abu Zrayq	30 December 1997 (aged 26)	24	2	(Libyan Football Federation) Al-Ahli Tripoli
8	MF	Noor Al-Rawabdeh	24 February 1997 (aged 26)	42	1	(Football Association of Malaysia) Selangor
9	FW	Ali Olwan	26 March 2000 (aged 23)	34	9	(Qatar Football Association) Al-Shamal
10	MF	Musa Al-Taamari	10 June 1997 (aged 26)	63	12	(French Football Federation) Montpellier
11	FW	Yazan Al-Naimat	4 June 1999 (aged 24)	35	11	(Qatar Football Association) Al-Ahli
12	GK	Abdallah Al-Fakhouri	22 January 2000 (aged 23)	11	0	(Jordan Football Association) Al-Wehdat
13	MF	Mahmoud Al-Mardi	6 October 1993 (aged 30)	52	7	(Jordan Football Association) Al-Hussein
14	MF	Rajaei Ayed	25 July 1993 (aged 30)	48	0	(Jordan Football Association) Al-Hussein
15	MF	Ibrahim Sadeh	27 April 2000 (aged 23)	26	1	(Qatar Football Association) Al-Khor
16	DF	Feras Shelbaieh	27 November 1993 (aged 30)	33	2	(Jordan Football Association) Al-Wehdat
17	DF	Salem Al-Ajalin	18 February 1988 (aged 35)	29	2	(Jordan Football Association) Al-Faisaly
18	MF	Saleh Rateb	18 December 1994 (aged 29)	34	0	(Jordan Football Association) Al-Wehdat
19	DF	Anas Bani Yaseen	29 November 1988 (aged 35)	114	7	(Jordan Football Association) Al-Faisaly
20	FW	Hamza Al-Dardour	12 May 1991 (aged 32)	121	35	(Jordan Football Association) Al-Hussein
21	MF	Nizar Al-Rashdan	23 March 1999 (aged 24)	14	1	(Jordan Football Association) Al-Faisaly
22	GK	Ahmad Al-Juaidi	9 April 2001 (aged 22)	0	0	(Jordan Football Association) Shabab Al-Ordon
23	DF	Ihsan Haddad (captain)	5 February 1994 (aged 29)	69	2	(Jordan Football Association) Al-Faisaly
24	MF	Yousef Abu Jalboush	15 June 1998 (aged 25)	4	0	(Jordan Football Association) Al-Faisaly
25	MF	Anas Al-Awadat	29 May 1998 (aged 25)	12	0	(Jordan Football Association) Al-Wehdat
26	MF	Fadi Awad	26 March 1993 (aged 30)	5	0	(Football Association of Malaysia) PDRM

=== Bahrain ===
Bahrain announced their final squad on 31 December 2023. On 13 January 2024, Ahmed Bughammar was replaced by Salem Hussain.

Coach: (Spain) Juan Antonio Pizzi

No.	Pos.	Player	Date of birth (age)	Caps	Goals	Club
1	GK	Abdulkarim Fardan	25 April 1992 (aged 31)	1	0	(Bahrain Football Association) Al-Riffa
2	DF	Amine Benadi	9 May 1993 (aged 30)	21	0	(Bahrain Football Association) Al-Muharraq
3	DF	Waleed Al Hayam	3 February 1991 (aged 32)	104	0	(Bahrain Football Association) Al-Muharraq
4	DF	Sayed Baqer	14 April 1994 (aged 29)	29	0	(Bahrain Football Association) Al-Riffa
5	MF	Mohamed Abdulwahab	13 November 1989 (aged 34)	18	1	(Bahrain Football Association) Al-Najma
6	MF	Mohamed Al-Hardan	6 October 1997 (aged 26)	29	2	(Bahrain Football Association) Al-Khaldiya
7	MF	Ali Madan	30 November 1995 (aged 28)	83	11	(United Arab Emirates Football Association) Ajman
8	MF	Mohamed Marhoon	12 February 1998 (aged 25)	54	14	(Kuwait Football Association) Kuwait SC
9	FW	Abdulla Yusuf Helal	12 June 1993 (aged 30)	96	13	(Football Association of the Czech Republic) Mladá Boleslav
10	MF	Kamil Al-Aswad	8 April 1994 (aged 29)	92	12	(Bahrain Football Association) Al-Riffa
11	MF	Ebrahim Al-Khattal	19 September 2000 (aged 23)	17	3	(Bahrain Football Association) Manama
12	MF	Ali Hassan Isa	21 May 1999 (aged 24)	3	0	(Bahrain Football Association) Al-Riffa
13	MF	Moses Atede	17 December 1997 (aged 26)	3	0	(Football Association of Malaysia) Kedah Darul Aman
14	FW	Abdullah Al-Hashsash	17 August 1992 (aged 31)	8	2	(Bahrain Football Association) Al-Ahli
15	MF	Jasim Al-Shaikh	1 February 1996 (aged 27)	59	4	(Bahrain Football Association) Al-Riffa
16	MF	Mohammed Abdul Qayoom	4 June 2001 (aged 22)	2	0	(Bahrain Football Association) Al-Riffa
17	DF	Salem Hussain	13 February 2001 (aged 22)	0	0	(Bahrain Football Association) Al-Shabab
18	DF	Mohamed Adel	20 September 1996 (aged 27)	32	0	(Bahrain Football Association) Al-Khaldiya
19	DF	Hazza Ali	9 June 1995 (aged 28)	6	0	(Bahrain Football Association) Al-Riffa
20	FW	Mahdi Al-Humaidan	19 May 1993 (aged 30)	54	5	(Bahrain Football Association) Al-Khaldiya
21	GK	Sayed Mohammed Jaffer (captain)	25 August 1985 (aged 38)	161	0	(Bahrain Football Association) Al-Muharraq
22	GK	Ebrahim Lutfalla	24 September 1992 (aged 31)	12	0	(Bahrain Football Association) Al-Ahli
23	DF	Abdullah Al-Khalasi	2 September 2003 (aged 20)	4	1	(Bahrain Football Association) Al-Muharraq
24	MF	Jasim Khelaif	22 February 1998 (aged 25)	11	0	(Bahrain Football Association) East Riffa
25	MF	Ibrahim Al-Wali	12 June 1997 (aged 26)	1	0	(Bahrain Football Association) Al-Najma
26	DF	Hussain Al-Eker	30 September 2001 (aged 22)	1	0	(Bahrain Football Association) Al-Riffa

== Group F ==
=== Saudi Arabia ===
Saudi Arabia announced a 30-men preliminary squad on 30 December 2023. The final squad was announced on 2 January 2024. On 13 January, Nawaf Al-Aqidi, Abbas Al-Hassan and Ayman Yahya were removed from the squad for disciplinary reasons and were replaced by Mohammed Al-Rubaie, Mohammed Al-Breik and Talal Haji. On 16 January 2024, Fahad Al-Muwallad withdrew injured and was replaced by Rayane Hamidou.

Coach: (Italy) Roberto Mancini

No.	Pos.	Player	Date of birth (age)	Caps	Goals	Club
1	GK	Mohammed Al-Rubaie	14 August 1997 (aged 26)	7	0	(Saudi Arabian Football Federation) Al-Ahli
2	DF	Fawaz Al-Sqoor	23 April 1996 (aged 27)	4	0	(Saudi Arabian Football Federation) Al-Shabab
3	DF	Awn Al-Saluli	2 September 1998 (aged 25)	2	0	(Saudi Arabian Football Federation) Al-Taawoun
4	DF	Ali Lajami	24 April 1996 (aged 27)	4	0	(Saudi Arabian Football Federation) Al-Nassr
5	DF	Ali Al-Bulaihi	21 November 1989 (aged 34)	47	1	(Saudi Arabian Football Federation) Al-Hilal
6	MF	Eid Al-Muwallad	14 December 2001 (aged 22)	1	0	(Saudi Arabian Football Federation) Al-Okhdood
7	MF	Mukhtar Ali	30 October 1997 (aged 26)	6	0	(Saudi Arabian Football Federation) Al-Fateh
8	MF	Abdulellah Al-Malki	11 October 1994 (aged 29)	32	0	(Saudi Arabian Football Federation) Al-Hilal
9	FW	Firas Al-Buraikan	14 May 2000 (aged 23)	36	6	(Saudi Arabian Football Federation) Al-Ahli
10	MF	Salem Al-Dawsari (captain)	19 August 1991 (aged 32)	78	22	(Saudi Arabian Football Federation) Al-Hilal
11	FW	Saleh Al-Shehri	1 November 1993 (aged 30)	29	15	(Saudi Arabian Football Federation) Al-Hilal
12	DF	Saud Abdulhamid	18 July 1999 (aged 24)	31	1	(Saudi Arabian Football Federation) Al-Hilal
13	DF	Hassan Kadesh	27 September 1992 (aged 31)	3	0	(Saudi Arabian Football Federation) Al-Ittihad
14	FW	Talal Haji	16 September 2007 (aged 16)	0	0	(Saudi Arabian Football Federation) Al-Ittihad
15	MF	Abdullah Al-Khaibari	16 August 1996 (aged 27)	18	0	(Saudi Arabian Football Federation) Al-Nassr
16	MF	Sami Al-Najei	7 February 1997 (aged 26)	18	2	(Saudi Arabian Football Federation) Al-Nassr
17	DF	Hassan Al-Tambakti	9 February 1999 (aged 24)	26	0	(Saudi Arabian Football Federation) Al-Hilal
18	MF	Abdulrahman Ghareeb	31 March 1997 (aged 26)	21	2	(Saudi Arabian Football Federation) Al-Nassr
19	DF	Rayane Hamidou	13 April 2002 (aged 21)	0	0	(Saudi Arabian Football Federation) Al-Ahli
20	FW	Abdullah Radif	20 January 2003 (aged 20)	7	1	(Saudi Arabian Football Federation) Al-Shabab
21	GK	Raghed Al-Najjar	20 September 1996 (aged 27)	0	0	(Saudi Arabian Football Federation) Al-Nassr
22	GK	Ahmed Al-Kassar	8 May 1991 (aged 32)	0	0	(Saudi Arabian Football Federation) Al-Fayha
23	MF	Mohamed Kanno	22 September 1994 (aged 29)	47	2	(Saudi Arabian Football Federation) Al-Hilal
24	MF	Nasser Al-Dawsari	19 December 1998 (aged 25)	16	0	(Saudi Arabian Football Federation) Al-Hilal
25	DF	Mohammed Al-Breik	15 September 1992 (aged 31)	42	1	(Saudi Arabian Football Federation) Al-Hilal
26	MF	Faisal Al-Ghamdi	13 August 2001 (aged 22)	4	0	(Saudi Arabian Football Federation) Al-Ittihad

=== Thailand ===
Thailand announced their final squad on 3 January 2024. On 7 January, Ekanit Panya declined his call-up for the tournament and was replaced by Picha Autra.

Coach: (Japan) Masatada Ishii

No.	Pos.	Player	Date of birth (age)	Caps	Goals	Club
1	GK	Siwarak Tedsungnoen	20 April 1984 (aged 39)	33	0	(Football Association of Thailand) Buriram United
2	DF	Santiphap Channgom	23 September 1996 (aged 27)	2	0	(Football Association of Thailand) BG Pathum United
3	DF	Theerathon Bunmathan (captain)	6 February 1990 (aged 33)	98	7	(Football Association of Thailand) Buriram United
4	DF	Elias Dolah	24 April 1993 (aged 30)	13	1	(Football Association of Indonesia) Bali United
5	MF	Kritsada Kaman	18 March 1999 (aged 24)	31	0	(Football Association of Thailand) BG Pathum United
6	MF	Sarach Yooyen	30 May 1992 (aged 31)	75	6	(Football Association of Thailand) BG Pathum United
7	MF	Supachok Sarachat	22 May 1998 (aged 25)	29	7	(Japan Football Association) Hokkaido Consadole Sapporo
8	MF	Picha Autra	7 January 1996 (aged 28)	8	0	(Football Association of Thailand) Muangthong United
9	FW	Supachai Chaided	1 December 1998 (aged 25)	31	5	(Football Association of Thailand) Buriram United
10	FW	Suphanat Mueanta	2 August 2002 (aged 21)	14	6	(Royal Belgian Football Association) OH Leuven
11	MF	Bordin Phala	20 December 1994 (aged 29)	39	6	(Football Association of Thailand) Port
12	DF	Nicholas Mickelson	24 July 1999 (aged 24)	7	1	(Danish Football Association) OB
13	MF	Jaroensak Wonggorn	18 May 1997 (aged 26)	8	0	(Football Association of Thailand) Muangthong United
14	MF	Rungrath Poomchantuek	17 May 1992 (aged 31)	5	0	(Football Association of Thailand) Bangkok United
15	FW	Teerasak Poeiphimai	21 September 2002 (aged 21)	7	0	(Football Association of Thailand) Port
16	DF	Jakkapan Praisuwan	16 August 1994 (aged 29)	11	1	(Football Association of Thailand) BG Pathum United
17	DF	Pansa Hemviboon	8 July 1990 (aged 33)	41	6	(Football Association of Thailand) Buriram United
18	MF	Weerathep Pomphan	19 September 1996 (aged 27)	25	0	(Football Association of Thailand) Muangthong United
19	MF	Pathompol Charoenrattanapirom	21 April 1994 (aged 29)	20	1	(Football Association of Thailand) Port
20	GK	Saranon Anuin	24 March 1994 (aged 29)	0	0	(Football Association of Thailand) Chiangrai United
21	DF	Suphanan Bureerat	10 October 1993 (aged 30)	16	1	(Football Association of Thailand) Port
22	MF	Channarong Promsrikaew	17 April 2001 (aged 22)	12	1	(Football Association of Thailand) Chonburi
23	GK	Patiwat Khammai	24 December 1994 (aged 29)	6	0	(Football Association of Thailand) Bangkok United
24	MF	Worachit Kanitsribampen	24 August 1997 (aged 26)	14	2	(Football Association of Thailand) Port
25	MF	Peeradon Chamratsamee	15 September 1992 (aged 31)	17	2	(Football Association of Thailand) Buriram United
26	DF	Suphan Thongsong	26 August 1994 (aged 29)	12	0	(Football Association of Thailand) Bangkok United

=== Kyrgyzstan ===
Kyrgyzstan announced a 32-men preliminary squad on 1 December 2023. On 25 December, Azim Azarov was added to the squad. On 30 December, Erbol Atabayev withdrew from the squad with injury. The final squad was announced on 4 January 2024. On 16 January, Kurmanbek Nurlanbekov was replaced by Alimardon Shukurov. Following the replacement, Adil Kadyrzhanov’s number was switched from 22 to 4 and Shukurov was given the number 22 shirt.

Coach: (Slovakia) Štefan Tarkovič

No.	Pos.	Player	Date of birth (age)	Caps	Goals	Club
1	GK	Erzhan Tokotayev	17 July 2000 (aged 23)	18	0	(Turkish Football Federation) Şanlıurfaspor
2	DF	Khristiyan Brauzman	15 August 2003 (aged 20)	13	0	(Kyrgyz Football Union) Abdysh-Ata Kant
3	DF	Tamirlan Kozubayev	1 July 1994 (aged 29)	48	2	(Football Association of Hong Kong, China) Eastern
4	MF	Adil Kadyrzhanov	14 July 2000 (aged 23)	1	0	(Kyrgyz Football Union) Dordoi Bishkek
5	DF	Ayzar Akmatov	24 August 1998 (aged 25)	21	1	(Kyrgyz Football Union) Abdysh-Ata Kant
6	DF	Amantur Shamurzayev	25 January 2000 (aged 23)	0	0	(Kyrgyz Football Union) Abdysh-Ata Kant
7	FW	Joel Kojo	21 August 1998 (aged 25)	8	2	(Uzbekistan Football Association) Dinamo Samarqand
8	MF	Azim Azarov	20 September 1996 (aged 27)	6	1	(Kyrgyz Football Union) Abdysh-Ata Kant
9	FW	Ernist Batyrkanov	21 February 1998 (aged 25)	27	3	(Kyrgyz Football Union) Abdysh-Ata Kant
10	MF	Gulzhigit Alykulov	25 November 2000 (aged 23)	27	4	(Football Federation of Belarus) Neman Grodno
11	DF	Bekzhan Sagynbayev	11 September 1994 (aged 29)	35	4	(Kyrgyz Football Union) Dordoi Bishkek
12	MF	Odilzhon Abdurakhmanov	18 March 1996 (aged 27)	34	2	(Kazakhstan Football Federation) Maktaaral
13	GK	Sultan Chomoev	20 January 2003 (aged 20)	0	0	(Kyrgyz Football Union) Dordoi Bishkek
14	DF	Aleksandr Mishchenko	30 July 1997 (aged 26)	15	0	(Kyrgyz Football Union) Dordoi Bishkek
15	MF	Kai Merk	28 August 1998 (aged 25)	7	1	(Luxembourg Football Federation) Union Titus Pétange
16	GK	Marsel Islamkulov	18 April 1994 (aged 29)	1	0	(Kyrgyz Football Union) Abdysh-Ata Kant
17	DF	Suyuntbek Mamyraliyev	7 January 1998 (aged 26)	8	0	(Kyrgyz Football Union) Dordoi Bishkek
18	DF	Kayrat Zhyrgalbek uulu (captain)	13 June 1993 (aged 30)	65	4	(Kyrgyz Football Union) Abdysh-Ata Kant
19	MF	Beknaz Almazbekov	23 June 2005 (aged 18)	4	0	(Turkish Football Federation) Galatasaray
20	DF	Bakhtiyar Duyshobekov	3 June 1995 (aged 28)	41	3	(Kyrgyz Football Union) Muras United
21	MF	Farkhat Musabekov	3 January 1994 (aged 30)	55	2	(Kyrgyz Football Union) Abdysh-Ata Kant
22	MF	Alimardon Shukurov	28 September 1999 (aged 24)	28	5	(Football Federation of Belarus) Neman Grodno
23	MF	Nurdoolot Stalbekov	13 September 2001 (aged 22)	1	0	(Kyrgyz Football Union) Alay
24	MF	Kimi Merk	6 July 2004 (aged 19)	3	0	(Uzbekistan Football Association) Pakhtakor Tashkent
25	FW	Dastanbek Toktosunov	2 September 2002 (aged 21)	2	0	(Kyrgyz Football Union) Neftchi Kochkor-Ata
26	MF	Atay Dzhumashev	15 September 1998 (aged 25)	4	0	(Kyrgyz Football Union) Abdysh-Ata Kant

=== Oman ===
Oman announced a 29-men preliminary squad on 10 December 2023. On 19 December, Muhammad Al-Amiri withdrew with an injury and was replaced by Juma Al-Habsi. The final squad was announced on 4 January 2024.

Coach: (Croatia) Branko Ivanković

No.	Pos.	Player	Date of birth (age)	Caps	Goals	Club
1	GK	Ibrahim Al-Mukhaini	20 June 1997 (aged 26)	22	0	(Oman Football Association) Al-Nahda
2	DF	Ghanim Al-Habashi	4 August 1998 (aged 25)	0	0	(Oman Football Association) Al-Nahda
3	DF	Fahmi Durbin	10 October 1993 (aged 30)	30	0	(Oman Football Association) Al-Nasr
4	MF	Arshad Al-Alawi	12 April 2000 (aged 23)	31	7	(Oman Football Association) Al-Seeb
5	DF	Juma Al-Habsi	28 January 1996 (aged 27)	28	0	(Oman Football Association) Ibri
6	DF	Ahmed Al-Khamisi	26 November 1991 (aged 32)	36	0	(Oman Football Association) Al-Seeb
7	FW	Issam Al-Sabhi	1 May 1997 (aged 26)	34	8	(Oman Football Association) Al-Nahda
8	FW	Zahir Al-Aghbari	28 May 1999 (aged 24)	33	0	(Oman Football Association) Al-Seeb
9	MF	Omar Al-Malki	4 January 1994 (aged 30)	14	4	(Oman Football Association) Al-Nahda
10	MF	Jameel Al-Yahmadi	27 July 1996 (aged 27)	59	3	(Qatar Football Association) Al-Kharaitiyat
11	FW	Muhsen Al-Ghassani	27 March 1997 (aged 26)	46	8	(Oman Football Association) Al-Seeb
12	MF	Abdullah Fawaz	3 October 1996 (aged 27)	33	5	(Oman Football Association) Al-Nahda
13	MF	Mataz Saleh	28 May 1996 (aged 27)	23	3	(Oman Football Association) Dhofar
14	DF	Ahmed Al-Kaabi	15 September 1996 (aged 27)	31	0	(Oman Football Association) Al-Nahda
15	MF	Musab Al-Mamari	22 January 2000 (aged 23)	12	0	(Oman Football Association) Al-Nasr
16	DF	Khalid Al-Braiki	3 July 1993 (aged 30)	32	0	(Oman Football Association) Al-Shabab
17	DF	Ali Al-Busaidi	21 March 1991 (aged 32)	76	1	(Oman Football Association) Al-Seeb
18	GK	Faiz Al-Rushaidi (captain)	19 July 1988 (aged 35)	67	0	(Bahrain Football Association) Manama
19	DF	Mahmood Al-Mushaifri	14 January 1993 (aged 30)	28	0	(Oman Football Association) Al-Nasr
20	MF	Salaah Al-Yahyaei	17 August 1998 (aged 25)	47	8	(Oman Football Association) Al-Nahda
21	DF	Abdulaziz Al-Gheilani	14 May 1995 (aged 28)	14	0	(Oman Football Association) Al-Nahda
22	GK	Ahmed Al-Rawahi	5 May 1994 (aged 29)	5	0	(Oman Football Association) Al-Seeb
23	MF	Harib Al-Saadi	1 February 1990 (aged 33)	78	1	(Oman Football Association) Al-Nahda
24	MF	Tamim Al-Balushi	3 November 1999 (aged 24)	3	0	(Oman Football Association) Al-Seeb
25	FW	Abdullah Al-Mushaifri	27 November 2001 (aged 22)	0	0	(Oman Football Association) Dhofar
26	FW	Abdulrahman Al-Mushaifri	16 August 1998 (aged 25)	5	0	(Oman Football Association) Al-Seeb

== Statistics ==
=== By age ===
==== Players ====
- Oldest: (Thailand) Siwarak Tedsungnoen (39 years, 267 days)
- Youngest: (Saudi Arabia) Talal Haji (16 years, 118 days)

==== Goalkeepers ====
- Oldest: (Thailand) Siwarak Tedsungnoen (39 years, 267 days)
- Youngest: (Syria) Maksim Sarraf (18 years, 303 days)

==== Captains ====
- Oldest: (India) Sunil Chhetri (39 years, 162 days)
- Youngest: (Indonesia) Asnawi Mangkualam (24 years, 100 days)

==== Coaches ====
- Oldest: (Croatia) Branko Ivanković (Oman) (69 years, 318 days)
- Youngest: (Spain) Jesús Casas (Iraq) (50 years, 81 days)

=== By club ===
Clubs with five or more players represented are listed.

Players	Club
14	(Malaysia) Johor Darul Ta'zim
11	(Qatar) Al-Sadd
10	(Lebanon) Al-Ahed, (Tajikistan) Istiklol
9	(Bahrain) Al-Riffa, (Oman) Al-Nahda, (Saudi Arabia) Al-Hilal
8	(Kyrgyzstan) Abdysh-Ata Kant, (Oman) Al-Seeb
7	(Hong Kong) Kitchee, (India) Mohun Bagan, (Jordan) Al-Faisaly, (United Arab Emirates) Al-Jazira, (Uzbekistan) Pakhtakor Tashkent, (Vietnam) Cong An Hanoi, (Vietnam) Hanoi FC
6	(India) Mumbai City, (Jordan) Al-Wehdat, (Lebanon) Al-Ansar, (Palestine) Hilal Al-Quds, (Thailand) Buriram United, (Thailand) Port
5	(China) Shanghai Port, (Iran) Sepahan, (Iraq) Al-Shorta, (South Korea) Ulsan HD, (Kyrgyzstan) Dordoi Bishkek, (Qatar) Al-Duhail, (Saudi Arabia) Al-Nassr, (Scotland) Celtic, (Thailand) BG Pathum United, (United Arab Emirates) Al-Ain, (United Arab Emirates) Al-Wasl, (United Arab Emirates) Shabab Al Ahli, (Uzbekistan) Nasaf

=== By club nationality ===
Players	AFC clubs
33	Qatar
31	United Arab Emirates
30	Saudi Arabia
29	Malaysia
28	China, India
27	Thailand
26	Vietnam
25	Bahrain
24	Oman
22	Hong Kong, Uzbekistan
21	Lebanon
20	Indonesia
18	Jordan
17	Kyrgyzstan, Tajikistan
15	Iran
14	Palestine
12	Iraq, South Korea
10	Japan
8	Syria
4	Australia
3	Kuwait

Players	Clubs outside AFC
19	England
12	Germany
10	Belgium, Scotland
8	Netherlands, Sweden
7	France
6	Russia
5	Turkey
4	Greece
3	Denmark, Norway, Portugal
3	Argentina, Kazakhstan
2	Belarus, Czech Republic, Egypt,
1	Azerbaijan, Bulgaria, Canada, Chile, Croatia, Cyprus, Italy, Libya, Luxembourg, Mexico, Moldova, Peru, Poland, Serbia, Slovakia, Spain

=== By club federation ===
Players	Federation
497	AFC
117	UEFA
5	CONMEBOL
3	CAF
2	CONCACAF

=== By representatives of domestic league ===
National squad	Players
India	26
Qatar	26
Saudi Arabia	26
United Arab Emirates	26
Vietnam	26
China	25
Malaysia	24
Oman	24
Bahrain	22
Thailand	22
Hong Kong	21
Lebanon	19
Tajikistan	19
Kyrgyzstan	17
Indonesia	16
Jordan	16
Uzbekistan	16
Palestine	14
Iran	12
South Korea	11
Iraq	9
Syria	8
Japan	5
Australia	4

=== Average age of squads ===
Average age	Countries
29	Iran, Lebanon
28	Thailand, Malaysia, China
27	Jordan, Hong Kong, Oman, South Korea, Qatar, Syria, Bahrain
26	Saudi Arabia, Australia, India, Palestine
25	Tajikistan, United Arab Emirates, Iraq, Japan, Uzbekistan
24	Indonesia, Kyrgyzstan, Vietnam

=== Coaches representation by country ===
Coaches in bold represented their own country.

Number	Country	Coaches
3	Croatia	Branko Ivanković (Oman), Petar Šegrt (Tajikistan), Igor Štimac (India)
3	Spain	Jesús Casas (Iraq), Tintín Márquez (Qatar), Juan Antonio Pizzi (Bahrain)
2	Japan	**Hajime Moriyasu**, Masatada Ishii (Thailand)
2	South Korea	Kim Pan-gon (Malaysia), Shin Tae-yong (Indonesia)
1	Argentina	Héctor Cúper (Syria)
1	Australia	**Graham Arnold**
1	France	Philippe Troussier (Vietnam)
1	Germany	Jürgen Klinsmann (South Korea)
1	Iran	**Amir Ghalenoei**
1	Italy	Roberto Mancini (Saudi Arabia)
1	Montenegro	Miodrag Radulović (Lebanon)
1	Morocco	Hussein Ammouta (Jordan)
1	Norway	Jørn Andersen (Hong Kong)
1	Portugal	Paulo Bento (United Arab Emirates)
1	Serbia	Aleksandar Janković (China)
1	Slovakia	Štefan Tarkovič (Kyrgyzstan)
1	Slovenia	Srečko Katanec (Uzbekistan)
1	Tunisia	Makram Daboub (Palestine)
