= 2020–21 West Bank Premier League =

Football league in Palestine

West Bank Premier League
- Season: 2020–21
- Champions: Shabab Al-Khalil
- Relegated: Taraji Wadi Al-Nes; Ahli Al-Khaleel
- AFC Cup: Shabab Al-Khalil
- AFC Cup: Hilal Al-Quds
- Matches: 132
- Goals: 360 (2.73 per match)
- Top goalscorer: Shehab Qumbor (15 goals)
- Biggest home win: Shabab Al-Am'ari 7–0 Wadi Al-Nes (30 November 2020)
- Biggest away win: Shabab Al-Samu 0–6 Al-Bireh Institute (04 April 2021)
- Highest scoring: Al-Bireh Institute 6–4 Wadi Al-Nes (8 April 2021)
- Longest winning run: 5 games Shabab Al-Khalil
- Longest unbeaten run: 18 games Shabab Al-Khalil
- Longest losing run: 7 games Wadi Al-Nes

The 2020–21 West Bank Premier League is the 18th season of the West Bank Premier League, the top football league in the West Bank of Palestine. The season started on 30 October 2020.

Markaz Balata are the defending champions of the 2019–20 season.

On 16 March 2021, Shabab Al-Khalil won their 6th West Bank Premier League title for the first time since 2016 after a 0–0 draw from Markaz Balata against Tubas in Round 19.

== Teams ==
=== Pre-season ===
A total of 12 teams compete in the league. Markaz Balata are the defending champions. Ahli Qalqilyah and Al-Quwaat Al-Falistinia were relegated from last season, and were replaced by promoted teams Tubas and Shabab Al-Dhahiriya.

=== Stadiums and locations ===
Team	Location	Stadium	Capacity
Ahli Al-Khaleel	Hebron	Hussein Bin Ali Stadium	8,000
Shabab Al-Dhahiriya	Ad-Dhahiriya	Dora International Stadium	18,000
Al-Bireh Institute	Al-Bireh	Faisal Al-Husseini International Stadium	12,500
Tubas	Jenin	AAUP International Stadium	5,750
Hilal Al-Quds	Al-Ram	Faisal Al-Husseini International Stadium	12,500
Jabal Al-Mukaber	Al-Ram	Faisal Al-Husseini International Stadium	12,500
Markaz Balata	Nablus	Nablus Football Stadium	4,000
Shabab Al-Am'ari	Al-Ram	Faisal Al-Husseini International Stadium	12,500
Shabab Al-Khalil	Hebron	Hussein Bin Ali Stadium	8,000
Shabab Al-Samu	Hebron	Hussein Bin Ali Stadium	8,000
Taraji Wadi Al-Nes	Wadi Al-Nes	Al-Khader Stadium	6,000
Thaqafi Tulkarem	Tulkarm	Jamal Ghanem Stadium	4,000

== League table ==
Pos	Team	Pld	W	D	L	GF	GA	GD	Pts	Qualification or relegation
1	Shabab Al-Khalil (C)	22	16	4	2	49	18	+31	52	Qualification for AFC Cup Group Stage
2	Markaz Balata	22	13	4	5	36	20	+16	43	
3	Hilal Al-Quds	22	9	8	5	26	16	+10	35	Qualification for AFC Cup Group Stage
4	Jabal Mukabar	22	10	5	7	34	29	+5	35	
5	Markaz Shabab Al-Am'ari	22	10	4	8	43	36	+7	34	
6	Al-Bireh Institute	22	9	5	8	36	30	+6	32	
7	Shabab Al-Dhahiriya	22	7	9	6	32	25	+7	30	
8	Tubas	22	6	8	8	22	35	−13	26	
9	Thaqafi Tulkarem	22	6	6	10	27	31	−4	24	
10	Shabab Al-Samu	22	4	10	8	28	38	−10	22	
11	Ahli Al-Khaleel (R)	22	4	9	9	17	24	−7	21	Relegation to West Bank First League
12	Taraji Wadi Al-Nes (R)	22	1	2	19	16	64	−48	5	Relegation to West Bank First League

Updated to match(es) played on 12 April 2021. Source:
Rules for classification: 1) Points; 2) Goal difference; 3) Goals scored;
(C) Champions; (R) Relegated

Note: Second place Markaz Balata were unable to participate in the AFC Cup as they failed to obtain an AFC license.

== Top scorers ==
Player	Country	Team	Goals
Shehab Qumbor	(Palestine)	Jabal Mukabar	15
Khaldon El Halman	(Palestine)	Shabab Al-Khalil	10
Sameh Maraaba	(Palestine)	Markaz Shabab Al-Am'ari	10
Hammam Abu Hasanein	(Palestine)	Markaz Shabab Al-Am'ari	9
Atef Abu Bilal	(Palestine)	Markaz Balata	8
Abuhabib	(Palestine)	Markaz Shabab Al-Am'ari	8
Yahya Alsbakhi	(Palestine)	Markaz Balata	8
Mahammad Fode	(Palestine)	Shabab Al-Dhahiriya	8

Updated to match(es) played on 12 April 2021. Source:
