= 2012–13 West Bank Premier League =

West Bank Premier League
- Season: 2012–13
- Champions: Shabab Al-Dhahiriya; 1st title
- Relegated: Jenin; Hilal Areeha
- Matches: 54
- Goals: 139 (2.57 per match)
- Biggest home win: Jabal Al Mukaber 5–0 Hilal Areeha; Jabal Al Mukaber 5–0 Ahli Al-Khaleel
- Biggest away win: Hilal Areeha 0–5 Hilal Al-Quds
- Highest scoring: Islami Qalqilya 3–5 Shabab Al-Khaleel; Shabab Al-Thahriyeh 6–2 Hilal Areeha

The 2012–13 West Bank Premier League was the 10th season of the top division in the West Bank, Palestine, and the 5th since the league became a yearly competition in 2008. It started on 31 August 2012 and finished on 4 May 2013. The defending champions are Hilal Al-Quds, who won their first title the season before.

== Teams ==
This season, the league has expanded from 10 to 12 teams. As a result, 4 teams (Ahli Al-Khaleel, Hilal Areeha, Islami Qalqilya and Jenin) were promoted from the West Bank First League while only 2 teams (Thaqafi Tulkarem and Markaz Tulkarem) were relegated.

== Final standings ==
Pos	Team	Pld	W	D	L	GF	GA	GD	Pts	Qualification or relegation
1	Shabab Al-Dhahiriya (C, Q)	22	16	3	3	45	20	+25	51	2014 AFC Cup
2	Hilal Al-Quds	22	12	7	3	33	16	+17	43	
3	Shabab Al-Khaleel	22	12	6	4	38	17	+21	42	
4	Jabal Al Mukaber	22	9	8	5	31	18	+13	35	
5	Merkaz Balata	22	9	5	8	35	34	+1	32	
6	Ahli Al-Khaleel	22	6	10	6	35	38	−3	28	
7	Wadi Al-Nes	22	6	7	9	29	32	−3	25	
8	Markaz Shabab Al-Am'ari	22	6	6	10	27	28	−1	24	
9	Islami Qalqilya	22	6	4	12	30	35	−5	22	
10	Al-Bireh Institute	22	4	9	9	25	36	−11	21	
11	Hilal Areeha (R)	22	5	5	12	27	56	−29	20	2013-14 West Bank First League
12	Jenin (R)	22	4	4	14	25	50	−25	16	2013-14 West Bank First League

Updated to match(es) played on 19 February 2013. Source: Soccerway
Rules for classification: 1) points; 2) goal difference; 3) number of goals scored.
(C) Champions; (Q) Qualified for the phase indicated; (R) Relegated
