= Ali El-Khatib =

Palestinian footballer

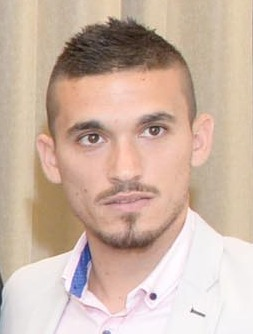

Personal information
- Full name: Ali El-Khatib
- Date of birth: 18 March 1989 (age 37)
- Place of birth: Shefa-'Amr, Israel
- Height: 5 ft 8 in (1.73 m)
- Positions: Attacking midfielder; right winger

Team information
- Current team: Hapoel Nir Ramat HaSharon
- Number: 10

Youth career
- 2001–2006: Hapoel Shefa-'Amr
- 2006–2008: Hapoel Haifa

Senior career*
Years	Team	Apps	(Gls)
2008–2009	Maccabi Ironi Shlomi Nahariya	7	(4)
2009	Maccabi Ironi Tamra	12	(1)
2009–2011	Jabal Al-Mukaber	–	(–)
2011	Hilal Al-Quds	2	(2)
2012	Jabal Al-Mukaber	1	(0)
2012	Hapoel Haifa	8	(4)
2012–2013	Maccabi Netanya	27	(6)
2013–2015	Maccabi Akhi Nazareth	45	(14)
2015–2016	Hapoel Haifa	10	(0)
2016–2017	Maccabi Akhi Nazareth	48	(9)
2017–2019	Hapoel Hadera	43	(7)
2019–2020	Maccabi Akhi Nazareth	33	(10)
2020–2024	Ihud Bnei Shefa-'Amr	74	(47)
2024	Hapoel Kfar Saba	8	(1)
2024–2025	Tzeirei Umm al-Fahm	8	(4)
2025	→ Hapoel Tirat HaCarmel (loan)	12	(4)
2025	Maccabi Akhi Nazareth	13	(7)
2025–	Hapoel Nir Ramat HaSharon	7	(2)

International career
2010	Palestine U23	8	(9)
2011	Palestine	6	(2)
- * Club domestic league appearances and goals as of 1 May 2026

Ali El-Khatib (Arabic: عَلِيّ الْخَطِيب, Hebrew: עלי חטיב; born 18 March 1989) is a professional footballer who plays for Hapoel Umm al-Fahm. Born in Israel, he has represented the Palestine national team.

== Club career ==
El-Khatib grew up in the Arab city of Shefa-'Amr in Northern Israel where he played for local side, Hapoel Shefa-'Amr.

He was brought to Palestinian club Jabal Al-Mukaber in by the coach, Samir Issa, in 2012. While playing for them, a controversy erupted over El-Khatib's contract.

Hapoel Haifa had given him a trial after someone had informed the coach of El-Khatib's talents. He was then chosen to join the club after 5 or 10 minutes of his try-out.

However, the signing caused an outrage with his previous club, who alleged that he had three-and-a-half years left on his contract, resulting in them taking the case to FIFA after a Tel Aviv District Court denied their appeal. El-Khatib denied that he signed a contract with the club, claiming that they had forged his signature on the contract. The president of Jabal Al-Mukaber compared Hapoel's action to that of a horse thief under the pretence that they stole a player who was under contract.

=== Hapoel Haifa ===
In a league match on April 1, 2012, he was involved in a mass brawl in which he was assaulted by staff members. The match, which was against Maccabi Petah Tikva, had ended with a free-kick goal for the hosts, Maccabi Petah Tikva. Immediately after the final whistle, the players went at each other.

Petah Tikva's goalkeeping coach, Ami Ganish, had unprovokingly headbutted El-Khatib which knocked him down. Afterwards, Yigal Maman, a high-ranking employee kicked him in the head while he was on the ground, causing him to lose consciousness.

El-Khatib had to be taken to the hospital and was treated for a fractured jaw and missing teeth. The two members of staff were detained by police.

=== Maccabi Netanya ===
In June 2012 it was announced that Ali El-Khatib has joined Maccabi Netanya.

== International career ==
As one of a growing number of Arab-Israelis playing professionally in the WBPL and representing Palestine internationally . He stated his dream is to play for Israel, and also said "It would be wonderful if one day the Palestinian national team could play against the Israel national team. Then I would play the first half of the game with one team and the second half with the other team."

He received his first national team cap against Thailand in 2014 World Cup qualifying on July 23, 2011. He scored his first senior team goal in a friendly match against Bahrain, the 67th-minute goal proved to be the winner as the game ended 1–0. 11 days later, he scored his second goal in a crucial match against Sudan which secured Palestine passage to the 2011 Pan Arab Games semifinal.

== Career statistics ==
=== Club ===
Club performance			League		Cup		League Cup		Continental		Total	
Season	Club	League	Apps	Goals	Apps	Goals	Apps	Goals	Apps	Goals	Apps	Goals
Israel			League		Israel State Cup		Toto Cup		Europe		Total	
2008–2009	Maccabi Ironi Shlomi Nahariya	Liga Alef	19	5	1	0	0	0	0	0	20	5
Palestine			League		Cup		League Cup		Asia		Total	
2009–2010	Jabal Al Mukaber	Premier League	-	-	-	-	-	-	-	-	-	-
2010–2011	Jabal Al Mukaber	Premier League	-	-	-	-	-	-	-	-	-	-
2011	Hilal Al-Quds	Premier League	2	1	-	-	-	-	-	-	2	1
2011	Jabal Al Mukaber	Premier League	1	0	-	-	-	-	-	-	1	0
Israel			League		Israel State Cup		Toto Cup		Europe		Total	
2011–12	Hapoel Haifa	Liga Al	11	4	1	0	0	0	0	0	12	4
2012–13	Maccabi Netanya	Liga Al	27	6	1	0	3	0	1	0	32	6
Career total			60	15	3	0	3	0	1	0	67	15

=== International ===
As of 31 January 2012

#	Date	Venue	Opponent	Score	Result	Competition	Reports
1.	6 December 2011	Al Muharraq Stadium, Arad	Bahrain	1–0	1–0	Friendly	
2.	17 December 2011	Ahmed bin Ali Stadium, Al-Rayyan	Sudan	1–0	2–0	2011 Pan Arab Games	

== Honours ==
- West Bank Premier League
  - Winner (1): 2009–10
  - Runner-up (1): 2010–11
