= 2010–11 West Bank Premier League =

West Bank Premier League
- Season: 2010–11
- Champions: Markaz Shabab Al-Am'ari
- Relegated: Hilal Ariha; Markaz Shabab Askar
- 2012 AFC President's Cup: Markaz Shabab Al-Am'ari

The 2010–11 West Bank Premier League started on 26 August 2010 and concluded on 7 May 2011. Markaz Shabab Al-Am'ari won the title due to a better goal difference over Hilal Al-Quds.

== Clubs ==
Club	City	Top Scorer (2010/11)	Notes
Al-Bireh Institute	Al-Bireh, Ramallah	Mohammed Nael 7 goals	
Hilal Areeha	Jericho	Mohammed Abu Dawud 9 goals	
Hilal Al-Quds	Jerusalem	Murad Alyan 20 goals	2011 Palestine Cup Winners
Jabal Al-Mukaber	Mount Scopus, Jerusalem	Ismail Amour 8 goals	
Markaz Balata	Nablus	Abdelhamid Abuhabib 12 goals	
Markaz Shabab Al-Am'ari	Ramallah	Eyad Abugharqud 20 goals	2012 AFC President's Cup
Markaz Shabab Asker	Nablus	Rami Musalmeh 8 goals	
Merkaz Tulkarem	Tulkarem	Fadi Salím 8 goals	
Shabab Al-Khaleel	Hebron	Shadi Farhan 7 goals	
Shabab Al-Dhahrieh	Al-Dhahrieh	Atef Abu Bilal 14	
Thaqafi Tulkarem	Tulkarem	Rida Al-Da'ma 5 goals	
Tarji Wadi Al-Nes	Wadi Al-Nes	Ashraf Nu'man 12 goals	2010/11 Supercup winners, 2010 Yasser Arafat Cup winners

=== Final standings ===
Pos	Team	Pld	W	D	L	GF	GA	GD	Pts	Qualification or relegation
1	Markaz Shabab Al-Am'ari	22	15	6	1	48	18	+30	51	2012 AFC President's Cup
2	Hilal Al-Quds	22	15	6	1	39	14	+25	51	
3	Shabab Al-Dhahiriya SC	22	11	7	4	40	21	+19	40	
4	Markaz Balata	22	10	6	6	34	31	+3	36	
5	Wadi Al-Neiss	22	9	5	8	29	23	+6	32	
6	Shabab Al-Khalil	22	7	4	11	24	35	−11	25	
7	Jabal Al Mukaber	22	6	6	10	27	32	−5	24	
8	Shabab Al-Bireh	22	7	3	12	19	33	−14	24	
9	Thakafi Tulkarm	22	5	7	10	26	33	−7	22	
10	Markaz Shabab Tulkarm	22	5	6	11	27	42	−15	21	
11	Hilal Ariha	22	5	5	12	23	37	−14	20	Relegation to Second Division
12	Markaz Shabab Askar	22	4	5	13	18	35	−17	17	Relegation to Second Division

Source: soccerway.com
Rules for classification: 1st points; 2nd goal difference.

=== Top scorers ===
The top-scorers were:

Rank	Scorer	Club	Goals
1	(Palestine) Eyad Abugharqud	Al-Am'ari	19
2	(Palestine) Murad Alyan	Hilal Al-Quds	18
