= Murad Alyan =

Palestinian footballer

Murad Alyan مراد عليان
Personal information
- Date of birth: 7 December 1977 (age 48)
- Place of birth: Jerusalem, Israel
- Height: 6 ft 1 in (1.85 m)
- Position: Forward

Youth career
- 1986–2001: Hapoel Jerusalem

Senior career*
| Years | Team | Apps | (Gls) |
| 2002–2003 | Beitar Ironi Ma'ale Adumim | 30 | (18) |
| 2003–2004 | Hapoel Bnei Lod | 28 | (24) |
| 2004–2005 | Sektzia Ness Ziona | 29 | (28) |
| 2005–2006 | Hapoel Bnei Lod | 27 | (11) |
| 2006–2009 | Beitar Shimshon Tel Aviv | 60 | (15) |
| 2009 | → Maccabi Kafr Qara (loan) | 20 | (6) |
| 2009–2013 | Hilal Al-Quds | | (49) |
| 2013 | Markaz Shabab Al-Am'ari | | (4) |
| 2013–2018 | Al-Arabi Beit Safafa | | (0) |

International career
| 2011 | Palestine | 9 | (7) |
- * Club domestic league appearances and goals as of 21 April 2012

Murad Alyan (Arabic: مراد عليان, Hebrew: מוראד עליאן; born December 7, 1977) Is a ex Palestinian professional football player.

== Career ==
Alyan grew up in Jerusalem as an Arab citizen of Israel. He joined Hapoel Jerusalem's youth set-up in 1986 as a nine-year-old after spending time with his neighborhood side Beit Safafa. While at Hapoel Jerusalem, Alyan was leading scorer at almost every youth level. He signed his first contract with Beitar Ironi Maale Adumim in 2002 scoring 18 goals, making him the team's leading scorer. In the 2003–04 season, Alyan joined Bnei Lod and helped them win Liga Bet by scoring 24 goals, a team high. The next season, he joined Ironi Ness Ziona (later renamed Sektzia Ness Ziona) and helped them win promotion to Liga Alef by scoring 28 goals. His prolific scoring at the lower levels of the Israeli League, prompted his former team, Hapoel Bnei Lod, now in Liga Artzit to re-sign him. His 11 goals helped Lod achieve a third successive promotion, to the second tier of the Israeli league Liga Leumit. He spent the next two seasons at Beitar Shimshon Tel Aviv F.C. who were playing in the third tier at the time. His final season with the club, saw him go on loan to Maccabi Kfar Qara.

In 2009, he signed his first fully fledged professional contract with Jerusalem-based Hilal Al-Quds. He scored 15 goals in his first season and finished as the West Bank Premier League top scorer. In his second season, he again finished top scorer with 20 goals in the league, he also managed an astonishing 13 goals in the Palestine FA Cup, leading Hilal Al-Quds to the title. He had a total of 35 goals in all three domestic competitions in 2010–11.

He clinched the Golden Boot for the third straight season in 2011–12 with 15 goals over the course of the 18-game season.

== International career ==
Alyan received his first official cap for Palestine in the qualifying round of the 2012 AFC Challenge Cup. This call-up came only months after Mousa Bezaz publicly announced he would not consider Alyan due to his age. In his first game against Bangladesh, he scored two goals in a 2–0 win over Bangladesh. In the following game against the Philippines he saw one of his shots hit the post. He continued his fine run of form two days later against Myanmar where he scored Palestine's opening and final goals of the match.

=== International goals ===
Scores and results list the Palestine's goal tally first.

| # | Date | Venue | Opponent | Score | Result | Competition |
|---|---|---|---|---|---|---|
| 1. | 21 March 2011 | Thuwunna Stadium, Rangoon | Bangladesh | 1–0 | 2–0 | 2012 AFC Challenge Cup qualifier |
| 2. | 21 March 2011 | Thuwunna Stadium, Rangoon | Bangladesh | 2–0 | 2–0 | 2012 AFC Challenge Cup qualifier |
| 3. | 24 March 2011 | Thuwunna Stadium, Rangoon | Myanmar | 1–1 | 3–1 | 2012 AFC Challenge Cup qualifier |
| 4. | 25 March 2011 | Thuwunna Stadium, Rangoon | Myanmar | 3–1 | 3–1 | 2012 AFC Challenge Cup qualifier |
| 5. | 29 June 2011 | Metallurg Stadium, Tursunzoda | Afghanistan | 1–0 | 2–0 | 2014 FIFA World Cup qualifier |
| 6. | 28 July 2011 | Faisal Al-Husseini International Stadium, Al-Ram | Thailand | 1–0 | 2–2 | 2014 FIFA World Cup qualifier |
| 7. | 28 July 2011 | Faisal Al-Husseini International Stadium, Al-Ram | Thailand | 2–1 | 2–2 | 2014 FIFA World Cup qualifier |

== Honours ==
Hilal Al-Quds

- Champion West Bank League 2011–12
- Champion Palestine Cup 2010–11

=== Individual ===
- Best Palestinian Player 2011
- Top scorer West Bank League: 3
  - Golden Boot West Bank League 2009–10
  - Golden Boot West Bank League 2010–11
  - Golden Boot West Bank League 2011–12
