= 2009–10 West Bank Premier League =

West Bank Premier League
- Season: 2009–10
- Champions: Jabal Al-Mukaber Club
- Relegated: Beit Ummar; Shabab Al-Khader
- 2011 AFC President's Cup: Jabal Al-Mukaber Club
- Top goalscorer: Murad Alyan (15 goals)

The format for the 2009–10 season saw the number of Premier League clubs reduced from 22 to 12 with each team playing each other twice. The 2009 season marked the last season before the league adopted a professional setup. Jabal Al-Mukaber won the 2009-10 Premier League while Wadi Al-Nes won the Palestine Cup with Beit Ummar and Shabab Al-Khader relegate to the first division.

== League table ==
Pos	Team	Pld	W	D	L	GF	GA	GD	Pts	Qualification or relegation
1	Jabal Al-Mukaber Club (C)	22	15	4	3	43	19	+24	49	Qualify to 2011 AFC President's Cup
2	Hilal Al-Quds	22	12	6	4	43	19	+24	42	
3	Markaz Shabab Al-Am'ari	22	13	3	6	42	22	+20	42	
4	Wadi Al-Nes	22	11	6	5	36	23	+13	39	
5	Thaqafi Tulkarem	19	11	2	6	39	31	+8	35	
6	Shabab Al-Khaleel	22	9	7	6	36	26	+10	34	
7	Merkaz Tulkarem	22	9	5	8	25	32	−7	32	
8	Shabab Al-Thahrea	22	8	6	8	32	28	+4	30	
9	Al-Bireh Institution	22	8	5	9	36	32	+4	29	
10	Shabab Al-Ibedea (R)	22	4	8	10	24	47	−23	20	Relegated to Second Division at the end of season
11	Beit Ummar (R)	22	2	3	17	20	52	−32	9	Relegated to Second Division at the end of season
12	Shabab Al-Khader (R)	22	1	3	18	19	64	−45	6	Relegated to Second Division at the end of season

(C) Champions; (R) Relegated

== Top scorers ==
Player	Country	Team	Goals
Murad Alyan	(Palestine)	Hilal Al-Quds	15
Ali Ayesh	(Palestine)	Shabab Al-Khaleel	10
Ismael Al-Amour	(Palestine)	Shabab Al-Bireh	8
Ahmad 'Alan	(Palestine)	Jabal Al-Mukaber Club	7
Jamal 'Alan	(Palestine)	Shabab Al-Bireh	7
Yahya Al-Sabakhi	(Palestine)	Shabab Al-Dhahiriya	7
Husam Wadi	(Palestine)	Markaz Shabab Al-Am'ari	7
