= Salman Amer =

Israeli footballer (born 1976)

Salman Amer سلمان عمر
Personal information
- Full name: Salman Amer
- Date of birth: 10 June 1976 (age 50)
- Place of birth: Jerusalem
- Position: Right back

Team information
- Current team: Hilal Al-Quds (manager)

Youth career
- Hapoel Jerusalem

Senior career*
Years	Team	Apps	(Gls)
1995–2009	Hapoel Jerusalem		
2004–2005	→ F.C. Ashdod	24	(0)

Managerial career
- 2009–2010: Hapoel Jerusalem (youth)
- 2010–2012: Hapoel Jerusalem (assistant)
- 2012–2014: Hapoel Jerusalem
- 2015–2016: Hilal Al-Quds
- 2017: Ahli Al-Khaleel
- 2017–2019: Ahli Al-Khaleel
- 2019–2020: Hapoel Katamon (youth)
- 2020: Hapoel Bnei Lod
- 2021: Shabab Al-Dhahiriya
- 2021–: Hilal Al-Quds
- * Club domestic league appearances and goals

Salman Amer (Arabic: سلمان عمر; born 10 June 1976) is a former-professional footballer who played as a right back. Today use as manager of the West Bank Premier League club Hilal Al-Quds. Amer played almost his entire career in Hapoel Jerusalem except of one season in F.C. Ashdod. After his retirement, Amer signed for Hapoel Jerusalem's staff and in 2012 was appointed to head coach. In December 2015 signed for Hilal Al-Quds and later to Ahli Al-Khaleel there won the West Bank Cup. In summer 2020, he signed for Hapoel Bnei Lod, though he left in November.
