= 2011–12 West Bank Premier League =

West Bank Premier League
- Season: 2011–12
- Champions: Hilal Al-Quds
- AFC President's Cup: Hilal Al-Quds

The 2011–12 West Bank Premier League started on 2 September 2011 and concluded on 21 April 2012. Hilal Al-Quds won their first title.

== Final standings ==
Pos	Team	Pld	W	D	L	GF	GA	GD	Pts	Qualification or relegation
1	Hilal Al-Quds	18	14	3	1	43	10	+33	45	2013 AFC President's Cup
2	Shabab Al-Khaleel	18	11	4	3	27	10	+17	37	
3	Shabab Al-Dhahiriya SC	18	10	4	4	36	16	+20	34	UAFA Cup (Note: Shabab Al-Dhahiriya SC qualified to the UAFA Club Cup as it won 2011-12 Palestine Cup.)
4	Wadi Al-Neiss	18	8	6	4	33	21	+12	30	
5	Markaz Shabab Al-Am'ari	18	9	0	9	32	30	+2	27	
6	Markaz Balata	18	6	6	6	22	26	−4	24	
7	Jabal Al Mukaber	18	5	4	9	17	30	−13	19	
8	Shabab Al-Bireh	18	4	4	10	15	25	−10	16	
9	Thaqafi Tulkarem	18	4	3	11	20	37	−17	15	
10	Markaz Shabab Tulkarm	18	1	2	15	15	55	−40	5	

Source: FIFA.com
Rules for classification: 1st points; 2nd goal difference.
