= Zaid Qunbar =

Palestinian footballer (born 2002)

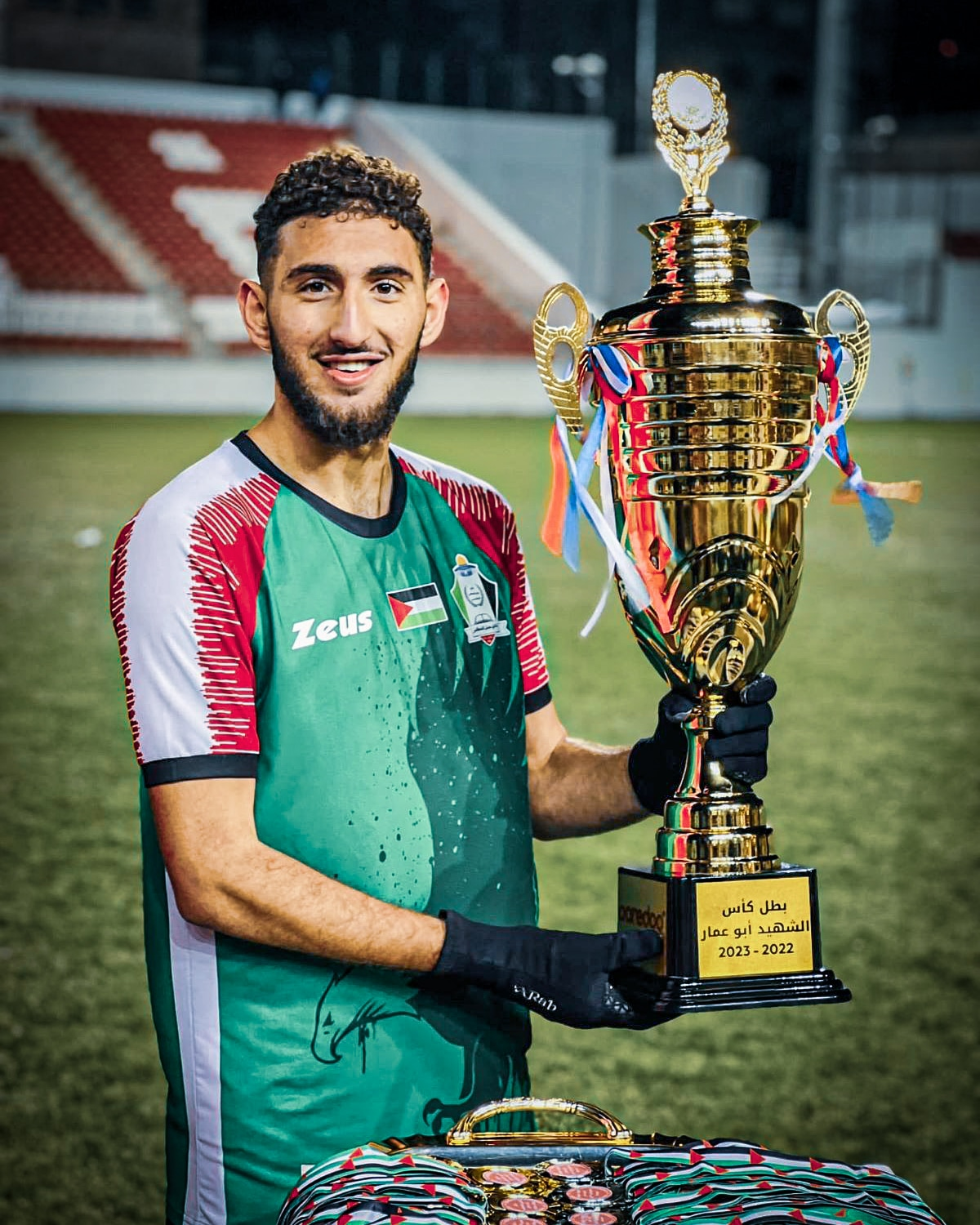

Personal information
- Date of birth: 4 September 2002 (age 24)
- Place of birth: Jerusalem
- Height: 1.87 m (6 ft 2 in)
- Position: Forward

Team information
- Current team: Al-Arabi

Youth career
- 2011–2014: Hapoel Jerusalem
- 2014–2019: Beitar Jerusalem
- 2019–2020: Hapoel Hadera

Senior career*
Years	Team	Apps	(Gls)
2020–2023	Jabal Al-Mukaber		
2021–2022	→ Shabab Al-Dhahiriya (loan)		
2023	Al-Wehdat SC		
2023–2024	Jabal Al-Mukaber		
2024	Al-Ittihad Club		
2024–2025	Al-Ahly Benghazi	16	(8)
2025–	Al-Arabi	3	(1)

International career^{‡}
- Palestine U23
2023–	Palestine	28	(4)
- * Club domestic league appearances and goals ‡ National team caps and goals as of 14 November 2026

Zaid Qunbar (Arabic: زيد القنبر; born 4 September 2002) is a Palestinian footballer who plays as an attacker for Kuwait Premier League club Al-Arabi and the Palestine national football team.

== Club career ==
Qunbar grew up in the Jabal Mukaber neighborhood in Jerusalem. He started playing on the Hapoel Jerusalem's youth team and then moved to Beitar Jerusalem. At the end of 2019, he left for Hapoel Hadera for two months.

On 13 May 2023, he signed for Al-Wehdat SC from the Jordanian Pro League, but after a month he returned to Jabal Al-Mukaber.

On 20 September 2025, on the last day of the summer transfers he joined Al-Arabi.

== International career ==
In January 2024, alongside his brother Shehab, Qunbar was named in Palestine 26-men squad for the 2023 AFC Asian Cup. He scored his first international goal in a 3–0 win over Hong Kong on 23 January.

On 15 October 2024, Qunbar rescued Palestine during the 2026 FIFA World Cup qualification against Kuwait where he scored a 90+3th stoppage time goal to equalise the match at 2–2.

== Career statistics ==
=== International ===
As of match played 19 November 2024

Appearances and goals by national team and year
National team	Year	Apps	Goals
Palestine	2023	2	0
Palestine	2024	11	3
Total		13	3

Scores and results list Palestine's goal tally first, score column indicates score after each Qunbar goal.

List of international goals scored by Zaid Qunbar
No.	Date	Venue	Opponent	Score	Result	Competition
1	23 January 2024	Abdullah bin Khalifa Stadium, Doha, Qatar	Hong Kong	2–0	3–0	2023 AFC Asian Cup
2	15 October 2024	Jassim bin Hamad Stadium, Doha, Qatar	Kuwait	2–2	2–2	2026 FIFA World Cup qualification
3	19 November 2024	Amman International Stadium, Amman, Jordan	South Korea	1–0	1–1	2026 FIFA World Cup qualification
4	4 December 2025	Lusail Stadium, Lusail, Qatar	Tunisia	2–2	2–2	2025 FIFA Arab Cup

== Honours ==
=== Clubs ===
Al-Arabi

- Kuwait Crown Prince Cup: 2025–26

=== Individual ===
- Kuwait Crown Prince Cup Golden Boot: 2025–26
