= Atef Abu Bilal =

Palestinian footballer

Atef Abu Bilal عاطف ابو بلال
Personal information
- Date of birth: 5 February 1984 (age 42)
- Place of birth: Shaqib al-Salam, Israel
- Height: 1.85 m (6 ft 1 in)
- Position: Winger

Team information
- Current team: Markaz Balata

Youth career
- Hapoel Be'er Sheva

Senior career*
| Years | Team | Apps | (Gls) |
| 2003–2008 | Hapoel Massos Segev Shalom | 42 | (4) |
| 2006 | → Maccabi Be'er Sheva (loan) | 12 | (0) |
| 2008–2010 | Maccabi Ironi Netivot | 38 | (6) |
| 2010 | Bnei Eilat | 0 | (0) |
| 2010–2012 | Shabab Al-Dhahiriya | ? | (?) |
| 2010–2012 | Shaba Al-Khalil | ? | (?) |
| 2013–2014 | Hapoel Rahat | 23 | (15) |
| 2014–2015 | Maccabi Segev Shalom | 15 | (18) |
| 2015–2016 | F.C. Be'er Sheva | 30 | (7) |
| 2016–2017 | F.C. Tzeirei Rahat | 4 | (2) |
| 2017 | Shabab Dura | ? | (?) |
| 2017 | Shabab Al-Khalil | ? | (?) |
| 2017–2018 | Beitar Nordia Jerusalem | 5 | (1) |
| 2018 | F.C. Tzeirei Rahat | 1 | (0) |
| 2018–2019 | F.C. Dimona | 28 | (5) |
| 2019–2020 | Ironi Kuseife | 12 | (2) |
| 2020– | Markaz Balata | 0 | (0) |

International career
| 2010–2013 | Palestine | 11 | (0) |
- * Club domestic league appearances and goals as of 1 July 2020

Atef Abu Bilal (Arabic: عاطف ابو بلال, Hebrew: עאטף אבו בילאל; born 5 February 1984) is a footballer who plays for Markaz Balata as a winger. Born in Israel, he played for the Palestine national team. He received his first call up to the Palestine national football team in 2010 against Sudan. He has since played for Palestine at the 2010 WAFF Championship, the qualifying rounds of the 2012 AFC Challenge Cup, and the 2014 World Cup qualifying stages.

== Career ==
Abu Bilal is a product of Hapoel Be'er Sheva F.C.'s youth system. He played one Liga Leumit match and ten Liga Alef matches for the club, but has spent most of his career playing in the lower divisions of Israeli football. Abu Bilal was concurrently playing for Palestinian club Shabab Al-Khalil SC and Israeli fifth tier side Maccabi Segev Shalom F.C. during 2014, yielding him an unprecedented 99-year ban from Israeli club competitions.
