= Maksim Sarraf =

Syrian footballer (born 2005)

Personal information
- Full name: Maksim Filippovich Sarraf
- Date of birth: 15 March 2005 (age 21)
- Place of birth: Moscow, Russia
- Height: 1.85 m (6 ft 1 in)
- Position: Goalkeeper

Team information
- Current team: Al-Karamah

Youth career
- –2023: CSKA

Senior career*
Years	Team	Apps	(Gls)
2024	Andijon	1	(0)
2025	Zaamin		
2025–	Al-Karamah		

International career^{‡}
2023–	Syria U20	13	(0)
2023–	Syria U23	4	(0)
- * Club domestic league appearances and goals ‡ National team caps and goals as of 25 March 2025

Maksim Filippovich Sarraf (Arabic: ماكسيم صراف; Russian: Максим Сарраф; born 15 March 2005) is a footballer who plays as a goalkeeper for Syrian club Al-Karamah. Born in Russia, he plays for the Syria national team.

== Early life ==
Sarraf was born on 15 March 2005 in Moscow, Russia to a Syrian father and a Russian mother, and had lived in the United States for a year as a child.

== Club career ==
As a youth player, Sarraf joined the youth academy of Russian side CSKA, where he recorded thirteen clean sheets in twenty-three appearances while playing for the club's under-16 team.

Ahead of the 2024 season, he signed for Uzbekistani side Andijon, helping the club win the 2024 Uzbekistan Cup. On 25 August 2024, he debuted for them during a 0–3 away loss to Nasaf in the league. In 2025, he signed for Uzbekistani side Zaamin.

== Style of play ==
Sarraf plays as a goalkeeper and is right-footed. Algerian news website Fennec Football wrote in 2021 that he has "good reflexes as well as good mobility".
