= Erbol Atabayev =

Kyrgyz-Russian footballer

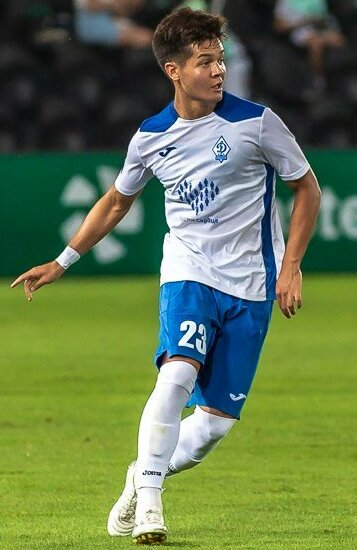

Personal information
- Full name: Erbol Kanatbekovich Atabayev
- Date of birth: 15 August 2001 (age 25)
- Place of birth: Kant, Kyrgyzstan
- Height: 1.75 m (5 ft 9 in)
- Position: Midfielder

Team information
- Current team: Lokomotiva Zagreb

Youth career
- 2007–2010: Abdysh-Ata Kant
- 2010–2012: Rubin Kazan
- 2012–2013: Barcelona
- 2013: L'Hospitalet
- 2013–2017: Gavà
- 2017–2018: Castelldefels
- 2018–2019: AE Josep Maria Gené
- 2019–2020: Granollers

Senior career*
Years	Team	Apps	(Gls)
2021	Santboià	5	(1)
2021	Abdysh-Ata Kant	15	(2)
2022–2023	Dynamo Makhachkala	38	(1)
2023–2024	Volgar Astrakhan	21	(0)
2024–2025	Abdysh-Ata Kant	34	(5)
2026	Muras United	20	(16)
2026–	Lokomotiva Zagreb	0	(0)

International career^{‡}
2022–	Kyrgyzstan	29	(3)
- * Club domestic league appearances and goals as of 1 September 2026 ‡ National team caps and goals as of 17 November 2026

Erbol Kanatbekovich Atabayev (Kyrgyz: Эрбол Атабаев; Russian: Эрбол Канатбекович Атабаев; born 15 August 2001) is a Kyrgyz footballer who plays as a midfielder for Croatian club Lokomotiva Zagreb and Kyrgyzstan national team.

== Club career ==
Born in Kant, Kyrgyzstan, Atabayev started his career with Abdysh-Ata Kant at the age of five. During his time with Abdysh-Ata Kant, he was linked with Spanish side Real Madrid, but would eventually go on to sign for Russian side Rubin Kazan at the age of eleven. While at Rubin, his father claimed the family were forced to obtain Russian citizenship in order for Atabayev to play. After two years in Russia, Atabayev made a stunning move to Spanish side Barcelona, becoming the first Kyrgyz player to play for the club.

Atabayev's time in Catalonia was not memorable, with then-sporting director Albert Puig saying that he had "hadn't heard anything" of Atabayev. After leaving Barcelona in 2013, he moved around a number of different Spanish clubs, eventually moving from Josep Maria Gené to Granollers in 2019.

His first taste of senior football came for Primera Catalana side Santboià, with whom he made five appearances in the 2020–21 season, scoring once. However, in April 2021 he returned to Kyrgyzstan to re-join boyhood club Abdysh-Ata Kant.

Having moved again from Kyrgyzstan to Russia, he signed with Dynamo Makhachkala in February 2022. He scored his first goal for the club against rivals Anzhi Makhachkala in May 2022, helping his team to secure promotion.

== International career ==
In March 2022, Atabayev regained Kyrgyz citizenship, making him eligible for the national team. In May of the same year, he was called up to the Kyrgyzstan national football team for 2023 AFC Asian Cup qualification matches.

== Career statistics ==
=== Club ===
As of matches played 30 May 2022.

Club	Season	League			Cup		Other		Total	
Club	Season	Division	Apps	Goals	Apps	Goals	Apps	Goals	Apps	Goals
Santboià	2020–21	Primera Catalana	5	1	0	0	0	0	5	1
Abdysh-Ata Kant	2021	Kyrgyz Premier League	15	2	0	0	0	0	15	2
Dynamo Makhachkala	2021–22	FNL2	7	1	0	0	0	0	7	1
Career total			27	4	0	0	0	0	27	4

=== International ===
As of matches played 17 November 2026

National team	Year	Apps	Goals
Kyrgyzstan	2022	4	0
Kyrgyzstan	2023	7	0
Kyrgyzstan	2024	5	0
Kyrgyzstan	2025	7	0
Kyrgyzstan	2026	6	3
Total		29	3

Scores and results list Kyrgyzstan's goal tally first, score column indicates score after each Atabayev goal.

List of international goals scored by Erbol Atabayev
No.	Date	Venue	Opponent	Score	Result	Competition
1	28 September 2026	Dolen Omurzakov Stadium, Bishkek, Kyrgyzstan	Maldives	1–0	5–0	Friendly
2	28 September 2026	Dolen Omurzakov Stadium, Bishkek, Kyrgyzstan	Maldives	3–0	5–0	Friendly
3	17 November 2026	Thiên Trường Stadium, Ninh Bình, Vietnam	Vietnam	2–1	2–1	2026 Casper Cup
