= Shehab Qunbar =

Palestinian footballer (born 1997)

Personal information
- Full name: Shehab Rizq Ibrahim Qunbar
- Date of birth: 10 August 1997 (age 29)
- Place of birth: Jabel Mukaber, Palestine
- Height: 1.86 m (6 ft 1 in)
- Position: Forward

Team information
- Current team: Jabal Al-Mukaber

Senior career*
Years	Team	Apps	(Gls)
2014–	Jabal Al-Mukaber		(55+)
2022	→ Al-Wehdat (loan)	10	(4)
2024	Al Tahaddy		

International career^{‡}
2017–2019	Palestine U23		(3)
2021–	Palestine	8	(2)
- * Club domestic league appearances and goals ‡ National team caps and goals as of 21 March 2024

Shehab Qunbar (Arabic: شهاب قنبر; born 10 August 1997) is a Palestinian footballer who last played as a forward for West Bank Premier League club Jabal Al-Mukaber and the Palestine national team.

== Club career ==
In July 2022, he signed with Al-Wehdat until the end of the year.

== International career ==
He played in 2018 AFC U-23 Championship and scored a goal against Thailand in a 5–1 victory that assured Palestine a place in the quarter-finals.

He made his debut for the senior team on 18 January 2021 against Kuwait.

In January 2024, Qunbar was named in Palestine's 26-men squad for the 2023 AFC Asian Cup alongside his brother Zaid. He scored his first international goals with a brace against Bangladesh in a 5-0 win.

== Career statistics ==
=== International ===
As of match played 26 March 2024

Appearances and goals by national team and year
National team	Year	Apps	Goals
Palestine	2021	1	0
Palestine	2022	–	
Palestine	2023	–	
Palestine	2024	7	2
Total		8	2

Scores and results list Palestine's goal tally first, score column indicates score after each Qunbar goal.

List of international goals scored by Shehab Qunbar
No.	Date	Venue	Opponent	Score	Result	Competition
1	21 March 2024	Jaber Al-Ahmad International Stadium, Kuwait City, Kuwait	Bangladesh	2–0	5–0	2026 FIFA World Cup qualification
2	21 March 2024	Jaber Al-Ahmad International Stadium, Kuwait City, Kuwait	Bangladesh	3–0	5–0	2026 FIFA World Cup qualification

== Honours ==
Al-Wehdat

- Jordan FA Cup: 2022
