= Markaz Balata =

- Full name: Markaz Shabab Balata
- Founded: 1954; 72 years ago
- Ground: Nablus Football Stadium, Nablus, West Bank
- Capacity: 15,000
- League: West Bank Premier League
- 2022–23: 5th of 12

Markaz Shabab Balata (Arabic: مركز شباب بلاطة, lit. 'Balata Youth Center') is a professional football team based in the Balata refugee camp in Nablus, Palestine. They play in the West Bank Premier League. Founded in 1954, it won promotion to the WBPL in 2010.

== Honours ==
- Palestine Cup
  - Runners-up (1): 2011

== Asian record ==
- AFC Cup: 1 appearance

2021: Group stage

=== Continental results ===
Season	Competition	Round	Opponent	Home	Away	Aggregate
2021	AFC Cup	Group B	(Lebanon) Al-Ansar	0–2		4th
2021	AFC Cup	Group B	(Bahrain) Al-Muharraq	2–3		4th
2021	AFC Cup	Group B	(Jordan) Al-Salt	5–0		4th
