= Jabal Al-Mukaber Club =

Palestinian football club

Jabal Al-Mukaber Football Club
- Short name: Jabal Mukaber
- Founded: 1996
- Ground: Faisal Al-Husseini International Stadium, Al-Ram
- Capacity: 12,500
- President: Mohammed Zahaika
- Manager: Murad Bannoura
- League: West Bank Premier League
- 2022/23: 1st
- Website: Jabal Al-Mukaber Club on Facebook

Jabal Al Mukaber (Arabic: نادي جبل المكبر) is a Palestinian professional football club based in East Jerusalem, Palestine, that competes in the West Bank Premier League.

== History ==
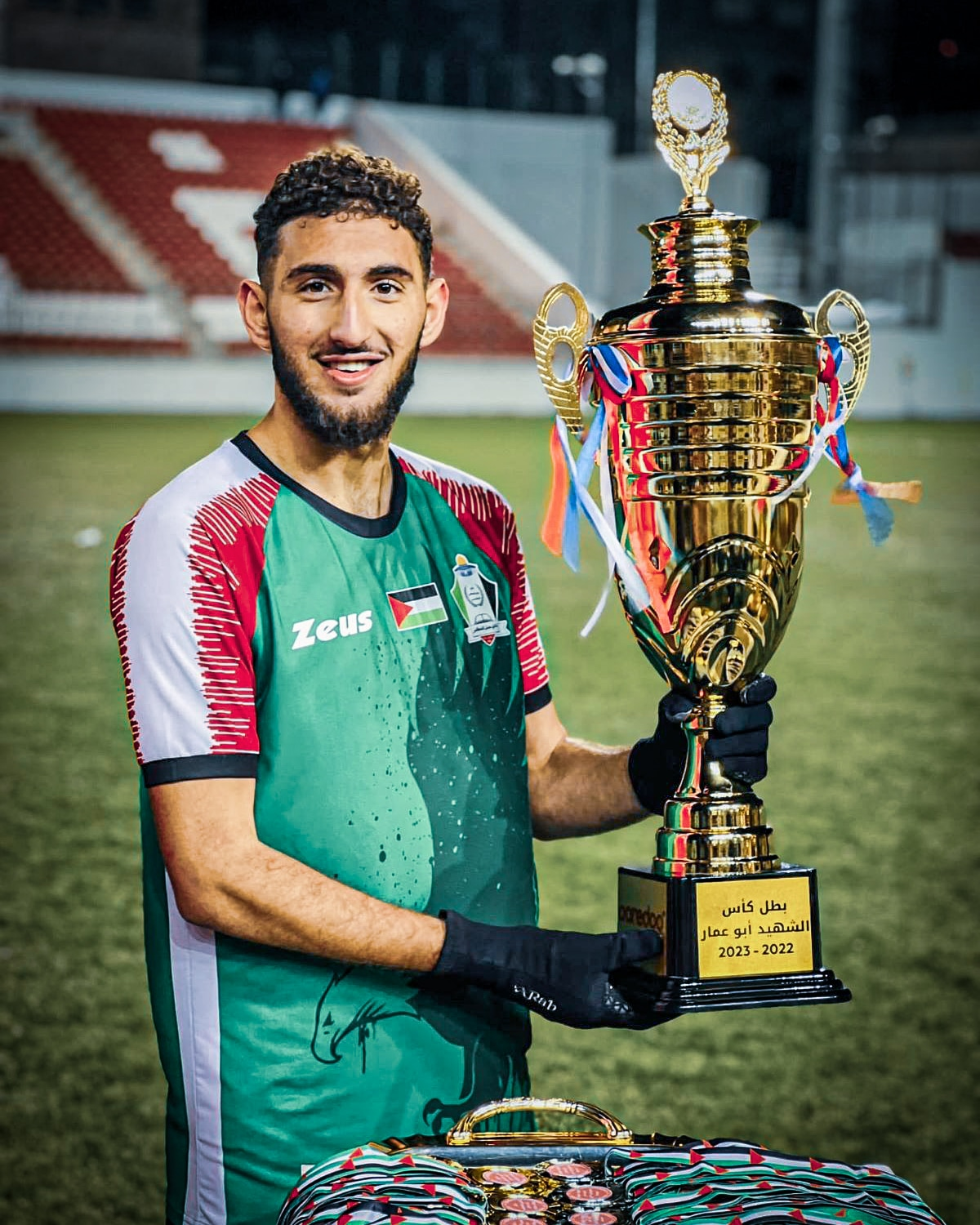
Zaid Qunbar holding the Palestine Championship cup, won in 2023 by Jabal Al-Mukaber

In 2010, the club were the winners of the West Bank Premier League, the first time in their history.

In light of the club's developments, legal issues arose in 2016 when it was unable to play games in Jerusalem due to restrictions on players with Palestinian identification, preventing them from entering Jerusalem, and matches for the club are now played at the Faisal Al-Husseini International Stadium in Al-Ram. In 2023, for the second time in the club's history, it managed to win the West Bank Premier League, despite many disturbances due to the political turmoil in the country.

== Current squad ==
As of 24 February 2024

Note: Flags indicate national team as defined under FIFA eligibility rules; some limited exceptions apply. Players may hold more than one non-FIFA nationality.

No.	Pos.	Nation	Player
1	GK	PLE	Tawfiq Ali
2	DF	PLE	Walid Qunbar
4	MF	PLE	Mahdi Isa
5	DF	PLE	Mousa Salim
6	DF	PLE	Mohammed Yameen
7	MF	PLE	Mohammed Obaid
8	DF	PLE	Bahaa Alqam (captain)
9	FW	PLE	Zaid Qunbar
10	FW	PLE	Shehab Qunbar
11	FW	PLE	Hamada Maraaba
12	DF	PLE	Sajed Ghoul
14	MF	PLE	Osaid Abu Thiab
16	MF	PLE	Bahaa Abu Jarira
17	DF	PLE	Nizar Abuqtefan
18	DF	PLE	Waseem Elayan
19	DF	PLE	Wadih Abu Adhim

No.	Pos.	Nation	Player
20	MF	PLE	Sameh Maraaba
21	MF	PLE	Mohammad Al Sarkhi
22	GK	PLE	Rami Hamadeh
23	MF	PLE	Mohammad At Lobadi
24	DF	PLE	Nizar Abu Ktifan
26	MF	PLE	Mahmoud Shqeerat
27	MF	PLE	Ahmed Abu Khadija
33	GK	PLE	Ihab Al-Qonbor
36	MF	PLE	Atwan Ja'abees
45	DF	PLE	Jaber Khattab
47	MF	PLE	Anas Uwesat
74	DF	PLE	Malik Rashid
77	MF	PLE	Hani Abdallah
99	FW	PLE	Nooraldeen Khalil

== Achievements ==
- West Bank Premier League
  - Champions (2): 2010, 2023.

== Performance in International competitions ==
- AFC President's Cup: 1 appearance

2011: 3° in Group Stage
