= Hilal Al-Quds Club =

Palestinian football club

Hilal Al-Quds
- Full name: Hilal Al-Quds Club
- Nickname: Lions of the Capital
- Founded: 1972; 54 years ago
- Ground: Faisal Al-Husseini International Stadium
- Capacity: 12,500
- Manager: Salman Amer
- League: West Bank Premier League
| Home colours | Away colours |

Hilal Al-Quds Club (Arabic: نادي هلال القدس) is a Palestinian sports and cultural club. Its professional football section was established in 1972 within the walls of the Old City of Jerusalem. The club's motto is "Development, training and rehabilitation of Jerusalemite youth is the focus of our cause." Al-Hilal Al-Quds Club is located in the heart of Jerusalem. 12,500-capacity Faisal Al-Husseini International Stadium is their home stadium in Al-Ram, near Jerusalem.

== History ==
Hilal Al-Quds was established in 1972 as an idea by Mahdi Hijazi. At the end of 1975, elections for an administrative body were held, and Ayoub Hijazi won as president. At the end of 1975, the club was accepted into the Palestinian Clubs Association as an active member. The official launch of Al-Hilal Club at a professional level began in 1978.

== Honours ==
- West Bank Premier League
  - Winners (4): 2011–12, 2016–17, 2017–18, 2018–19
- Palestine Cup
  - Winners (1): 2017–18
- West Bank Cup
  - Winners (3): 2010–11, 2013–14, 2017–18

== Performance in AFC competitions ==
- AFC Cup: 4 appearances

2015: Play-off round
2018: Play-off round
2019: Group stage
2020: Group stage

- AFC President's Cup/AFC Challenge League: 3 appearance

2013: Final stage
2024–25: Group stage
2025–26:Did not enter
