= Shabab Al-Dhahiriya SC =

Shabab Al-Dhahiriya SC شباب الظاهرية
- Full name: Shabab Al-Dhahiriya Sports Club نادى شباب الظاهرية الرياضى
- Nicknames: Ghozlan Al-Janoob, Al-Ghozlan
- Founded: 1974; 52 years ago as Al-Dhahiriya Youth Football Club
- Ground: Dura International Stadium, Hebron
- Capacity: 18,000
- League: West Bank Premier League
Home colours	Away colours

Shabab Al-Dhahiriya Sports Club (Arabic: نادي شباب الظاهرية الرياضي) is a Palestinian professional football team based in Ad-Dhahiriya, Hebron, Palestine and plays in the West Bank Premier League. Shabab Al-Dhahiriya, or just how fans like to call it: Ghozlan Al-Janoob (غزلان الجنوب) (Arabic for Deers of the South), is one of the most supported football teams in Palestine, and has the largest fan base among all sports teams of the West Bank Premier League. It has won many local competitions, including 2 league titles, 2 local cups, 1 Supercup as well as other various accumulations.

Shabab Al-Dhahiriya participated in the 2012–13 UAFA Club Cup, defeating Al-Oruba SC of Oman on a walkover after the Omani team refused to play the second-leg game in Palestine due to security concerns. The team then reached the second round and lost against Al-Quwa Al-Jawiya of Iraq 4–0 on aggregate. In 2014, Shabab Al-Dhahiriya competed in the 2014 AFC Cup qualifying play-offs against Alay Osh of Kyrgyzstan, and lost 7–8 on penalties after a 1–1 draw. Shabab Al-Dhahiriya is considered one of the only teams in Palestine to fully rely on its homegrown talents from its football school. The team has an Ultras fan base called Ultras Ghozlani 74, who are renowned for their ultra-fanatical support for the team.

== Achievements ==
- West Bank Cup:
  - Winner (2): 1982–83, 2011–12
- West Bank First League:
  - Winner (1): 1985–86
- West Bank Youth Cup:
  - Winner (1): 1993
- Palestinian Football Association Cup:
  - Winner (1): 2005
- West Bank Super Cup:
  - Winner (1): 2011–12
- Yasser Arafat Cup:
  - Winner (2): 2011–12, 2015–2016
- West Bank Premier League:
  - Winner (2): 2012–13, 2014–15

== Performance in International competitions ==
- UAFA Cup: 1 appearance

2012–13: Second round

- AFC Cup: 2 appearances

2014: Qualifying play-off
2016: Group stage
