= 2015 WAFF U-23 Championship squads =

WAFF Championship tournament

The 2015 WAFF U-23 Championship was an international football tournament held in Qatar from 30 September to 14 October 2015. It was the first edition of the U-23 age group competition organised by the West Asian Football Federation.

The ten national teams involved in the tournament were required to register a squad of at most 23 players, including three goalkeepers. Only players in these squads were eligible to take part in the tournament. Players born on or after 1 January 1992 were eligible to compete in the tournament.

The full squad listings are below. The age listed for each player is on 30 September 2015, the first day of the tournament. The nationality for each club reflects the national association (not the league) to which the club is affiliated. A flag is included for coaches who are of a different nationality than their own national team. Players in boldface were capped at full international level prior to being called up.

== Group A ==
=== Jordan ===
Coach: Jamal Abu-Abed

No.	Pos.	Player	Date of birth (age)	Club
1	GK	Nour Bani Attiah	25 January 1993 (aged 22)	(Jordan Football Association) Al-Faisaly
2	DF	Yousef Al-Alousi	17 December 1993 (aged 21)	(Jordan Football Association) Al-Faisaly
3	DF	Mohannad Khairullah	25 July 1993 (aged 22)	(Jordan Football Association) Al-Jazeera
4	DF	Bara' Marei	13 April 1994 (aged 21)	(Jordan Football Association) Al-Faisaly
5	DF	Munther Raja	22 February 1993 (aged 22)	(Jordan Football Association) Al-Wehdat
6	DF	Omar Al-Manasrah	15 February 1994 (aged 21)	(Jordan Football Association) Al-Jazeera
7	MF	Fadi Awad	26 March 1993 (aged 22)	(Jordan Football Association) Al-Jalil
8	MF	Mahmoud Al-Mardi	6 October 1993 (aged 21)	(Jordan Football Association) Al-Ahli
9	MF	Ahmed Al-Essawi	16 July 1993 (aged 22)	(Jordan Football Association) Shabab Al-Ordon
10	FW	Laith Al-Bashtawi	12 March 1994 (aged 21)	(Jordan Football Association) Al-Wehdat
11	MF	Ahmad Sariweh	23 January 1994 (aged 21)	(Jordan Football Association) Al-Wehdat
12	GK	Mohammad Abu Nabhan	1 July 1994 (aged 21)	(Jordan Football Association) Al-Wehdat
13	MF	Saleh Rateb	18 December 1994 (aged 20)	(Jordan Football Association) Al-Wehdat
14	MF	Yazan Thalji	3 September 1994 (aged 21)	(Jordan Football Association) Al-Ahli
15	DF	Ali Al-Rthoom	24 August 1993 (aged 22)	(Jordan Football Association) Al-Ahli
16	MF	Samir Raja	3 September 1994 (aged 21)	(Jordan Football Association) Al-Ahli
17	FW	Ahmed Hisham	9 April 1993 (aged 22)	(Jordan Football Association) Al-Wehdat
18	DF	Ahmad Yaser	26 March 1994 (aged 21)	(Jordan Football Association) Shabab Al-Ordon
19	FW	Ahmed Al-Reyahi	13 January 1995 (aged 20)	(Kuwait Football Association) Al-Qadsia
20	FW	Baha' Faisal	30 May 1995 (aged 20)	(Jordan Football Association) Al-Wehdat
21	DF	Feras Shelbaieh	27 November 1993 (aged 21)	(Jordan Football Association) Al-Wehdat
22	GK	Yazid Abu Layla	8 January 1993 (aged 22)	(Jordan Football Association) Shabab Al-Ordon
23	FW	Bilal Qwaider	7 May 1993 (aged 22)	(Jordan Football Association) Shabab Al-Ordon

=== Palestine ===
Coach: Abdul Fattah Arar

No.	Pos.	Player	Date of birth (age)	Club
1	GK	Rami Hamadeh	24 March 1994 (aged 21)	(Palestinian Football Association) Thaqafi Tulkarem
2	DF	Ameed Makharza	25 May 1994 (aged 21)	(Palestinian Football Association) Shabab Al-Dhahiriya
3	DF	Wael Sharawi	9 April 1995 (aged 20)	(Palestinian Football Association) Shabab Al-Khalil
4	DF	Wasim Haloon	9 February 1994 (aged 21)	(Palestinian Football Association) Shabab Al-Dhahiriya
5	DF	Mohammed Saleh	18 July 1993 (aged 22)	(Palestinian Football Association) Ahli Al-Khaleel
6	DF	Mohammed Hindi	29 October 1995 (aged 19)	(Palestinian Football Association) Hilal Al-Quds
7	MF	Oday Kharoub	5 February 1993 (aged 22)	(Palestinian Football Association) Thaqafi Tulkarem
8	MF	Said Diab	2 October 1994 (aged 20)	(Palestinian Football Association) Shabab Yatta
9	FW	Mohammed Maraaba	12 March 1994 (aged 21)	(Palestinian Football Association) Shabab Al-Khader
10	MF	Mosab Abusalem	18 August 1993 (aged 22)	(Palestinian Football Association) Ahli Al-Khaleel
11	MF	Hazem Abuhammad	22 February 1996 (aged 19)	(Palestinian Football Association) Taraji Wadi Al-Nes
12	MF	Mahmoud Abu Warda	31 May 1995 (aged 20)	(Palestinian Football Association) Shabab Al-Khalil
13	MF	Osama Sabah	18 August 1993 (aged 22)	(Palestinian Football Association) Thaqafi Tulkarem
14	FW	Islam Batran	1 October 1994 (aged 20)	(Palestinian Football Association) Ahli Al-Khaleel
16	GK	Amin Darwish	6 March 1993 (aged 22)	(Palestinian Football Association) Shabab Dura
17	FW	Mahmoud Wadi	19 December 1994 (aged 20)	(Palestinian Football Association) Ahli Al-Khaleel
18	DF	Ahmed Zraiq	1 April 1996 (aged 19)	(Palestinian Football Association) Markaz Balata
19	DF	Alaa Badran	7 May 1994 (aged 21)	(Palestinian Football Association) Thaqafi Tulkarem
20	MF	Mohanad Fannoun	18 September 1995 (aged 20)	(Palestinian Football Association) Shabab Al-Khalil
22	GK	Naim Abuaker	20 January 1995 (aged 20)	(Palestinian Football Association) Ahli Al-Khaleel
25	MF	Rami Salem	7 November 1996 (aged 18)	(Palestinian Football Association) Markaz Tulkarem
28	FW	Mohammed Abu Asfour	11 May 1994 (aged 21)	(Palestinian Football Association) Hilal Al-Quds
30	DF	Yousef Al-Ashhab	10 February 1995 (aged 20)	(Palestinian Football Association) Shabab Al-Khalil

=== Qatar ===
Coach: (Spain) Félix Sánchez

No.	Pos.	Player	Date of birth (age)	Club
1	GK	Yousef Hassan	24 May 1996 (aged 19)	(Royal Belgian Football Association) Eupen
2	DF	Musab Kheder	1 January 1993 (aged 22)	(Qatar Football Association) Al-Sadd
3	DF	Sultan Al-Brake	7 April 1996 (aged 19)	(Royal Spanish Football Federation) Cultural Leonesa
4	MF	Ahmed Moein	20 October 1995 (aged 19)	(Royal Belgian Football Association) Eupen
5	MF	Abdulrahman Anad	6 September 1996 (aged 19)	(Qatar Football Association) Al-Rayyan
6	DF	Salem Al Hajri	10 April 1996 (aged 19)	(Royal Belgian Football Association) Eupen
7	FW	Ahmed Alaaeldin	31 January 1993 (aged 22)	(Qatar Football Association) Al-Rayyan
8	MF	Ahmed Fatehi	25 January 1993 (aged 22)	(Qatar Football Association) Al-Arabi
9	MF	Othman Al-Yahri	24 June 1993 (aged 22)	(Qatar Football Association) El-Jaish
10	MF	Saleh Al-Yazidi	10 February 1993 (aged 22)	(Qatar Football Association) Al-Sadd
11	MF	Ahmed Fadhel	7 April 1993 (aged 22)	(Qatar Football Association) Al-Wakrah
12	MF	Abdurahman Al-Harazi	1 January 1994 (aged 21)	(Qatar Football Association) Al-Sailiya
13	GK	Satea Abdelnasser	11 September 1993 (aged 22)	(Qatar Football Association) Al-Ahli
14	MF	Nasser Khalfan	17 October 1993 (aged 21)	(Qatar Football Association) Lekhwiya
15	FW	Jassem Al-Jalabi	21 February 1996 (aged 19)	(Qatar Football Association) Al-Wakrah
16	DF	Tameem Al-Muhaza	21 July 1996 (aged 19)	(Royal Spanish Football Federation) Cultural Leonesa
17	DF	Mohammed Alaaeldin	24 January 1994 (aged 21)	(Qatar Football Association) Al-Rayyan
18	MF	Assim Madibo	22 October 1996 (aged 18)	(Royal Spanish Football Federation) Cultural Leonesa
19	FW	Almoez Ali	19 August 1996 (aged 19)	(Royal Spanish Football Federation) Cultural Leonesa
20	MF	Akram Afif	18 November 1996 (aged 18)	(Royal Belgian Football Association) Eupen
21	FW	Hamza Sanhaji	22 April 1994 (aged 21)	(Qatar Football Association) Al-Sadd
22	GK	Muhannad Naim	1 January 1993 (aged 22)	(Qatar Football Association) Al-Sadd
23	DF	Fahad Al-Abdulrahman	6 April 1995 (aged 20)	(Royal Belgian Football Association) Eupen

=== Yemen ===
Coach: Amin Al-Sanini

No.	Pos.	Player	Date of birth (age)	Club
2	DF	Mahdi Majfan	1 January 1996 (aged 19)	(Yemen Football Association) Al-Ahli Sana'a
3	DF	Aiman Dahrog	27 May 1996 (aged 19)	(Yemen Football Association) Al-Ahli Sana'a
4	DF	Ammar Hamsan	5 November 1994 (aged 20)	(Yemen Football Association) Al-Shula
5	DF	Abdulmuain Al-Jarshi	1 January 1994 (aged 21)	(Yemen Football Association) Al-Yarmuk
6	MF	Gehad Ahmed	27 May 1996 (aged 19)	(Yemen Football Association) Al-Ahli Taizz
7	MF	Waleed Al-Hubaishi	2 January 1993 (aged 22)	(Yemen Football Association) Al-Saqr
8	MF	Basheer Al-Manifi	1 January 1994 (aged 21)	(Yemen Football Association) Al-Oruba
10	MF	Mohammed Al-Dahi	3 April 1996 (aged 19)	(Yemen Football Association) Al-Ahli Sana'a
11	FW	Abdulwasea Al-Matari	4 July 1994 (aged 21)	(Oman Football Association) Al-Oruba
12	MF	Khaled Mohammed	23 April 1996 (aged 19)	(Yemen Football Association) Al-Shaab Hadramaut
13	DF	Ala Addin Mahdi	1 January 1996 (aged 19)	(Yemen Football Association) Al-Ahli Taizz
15	MF	Osamah Anbar	20 January 1995 (aged 20)	(Yemen Football Association) Al-Yarmuk
16	MF	Mohammed Alos		(Yemen Football Association) Al-Wehda Sana'a
17	DF	Mohammed Al-Sarori	6 August 1994 (aged 21)	(Yemen Football Association) Al-Ahli Sana'a
18	MF	Ahmed Alos	3 April 1994 (aged 21)	(Yemen Football Association) Al-Wehda Sana'a
19	DF	Mohammed Boqshan	10 March 1994 (aged 21)	(Yemen Football Association) Al-Tilal
20	FW	Ali Khalil		(Yemen Football Association) Al-Wehda Sana'a
21	FW	Ahmed Al-Sarori	9 August 1998 (aged 17)	(Yemen Football Association) Al-Ahli
22	GK	Yaser Thawab	1 January 1996 (aged 19)	(Yemen Football Association) Al-Hilal Al-Sahili
23	GK	Esam Al-Hakimi	20 October 1993 (aged 21)	(Yemen Football Association) Al-Wehda Sana'a
27	GK	Salem Al-Harsh	7 October 1998 (aged 16)	(Yemen Football Association) Al-Wehda Aden
36	FW	Wahib Al-Mufti		(Yemen Football Association) Shaab Ibb
40	FW	Ali Hafeedh	21 February 1997 (aged 18)	(Yemen Football Association) Al-Wehda Aden

== Group B ==
=== Bahrain ===
Coach: Marjan Eid

No.	Pos.	Player	Date of birth (age)	Club
1	GK	Sayed Abbas Jaafar	3 May 1995 (aged 20)	(Bahrain) Manama
2	DF	Sayed Baqer	14 April 1994 (aged 21)	(Bahrain) Al-Ahli
3	DF	Mahmoud Mokhtar	5 January 1996 (aged 19)	(Bahrain) Al-Shabab
4	DF	Mohamed Matar	20 March 1996 (aged 19)	(Bahrain) Al-Muharraq
6	MF	Isa Jehad	14 March 1993 (aged 22)	(Bahrain) Al-Riffa
7	MF	Ahmed Balayett		
8	MF	Mohamed Shaheen	25 February 1993 (aged 22)	(Bahrain) Al-Muharraq
9	FW	Khalil Salman		(Bahrain) Isa Town
10	MF	Jasim Al-Shaikh	1 February 1996 (aged 19)	(Bahrain) Al-Ahli
11	MF	Ahmed Jalal Kudarbi	21 January 1993 (aged 22)	(Bahrain) East Riffa
12	FW	Samoul Al-Noor		
13	DF	Hussain Abduljalil		(Bahrain) Al-Ahli
14	MF	Mujtaba Malek	21 February 1993 (aged 22)	(Bahrain) Al-Busaiteen
15	DF	Ammar Abdulhusain		(Bahrain) Al-Hala
16	DF	Abdulla Bakheet	4 April 1994 (aged 21)	(Bahrain) Al-Riffa
17	MF	Mahdi Abdullatif	15 February 1993 (aged 22)	(Bahrain) Al-Muharraq
18	MF	Ali Madan	30 November 1995 (aged 19)	(Bahrain) Al-Shabab
19	FW	Ali Hasan Saeed	21 April 1995 (aged 20)	(Bahrain) Malkiya
20	FW	Ali Al-Asfoor		(Bahrain) Al-Ahli
21	GK	Jasim Al-Naar	14 January 1996 (aged 19)	(Bahrain) Al-Muharraq
22	GK	Mahboob Al-Doseri	4 October 1995 (aged 19)	(Bahrain) Al-Budaiya
24	DF	Abdulla Al-Ajmi	7 August 1994 (aged 21)	(Bahrain) Al-Busaiteen
27	MF	Abdulrahman Yusuf	24 February 1993 (aged 22)	(Bahrain) Al-Najma

=== Iran ===
Coach: Mohammad Khakpour

No.	Pos.	Player	Date of birth (age)	Club
1	GK	Mohammadreza Akhbari	15 February 1993 (aged 22)	(Iran) Tractor Sazi
4	DF	Rouzbeh Cheshmi	24 July 1993 (aged 22)	(Iran) Esteghlal
5	DF	Mohammad Hossein Moradmand	22 June 1993 (aged 22)	(Iran) Padideh
7	MF	Ali Karimi	11 February 1994 (aged 21)	(Iran) Sepahan
8	MF	Farshid Esmaeili	23 February 1994 (aged 21)	(Iran) Esteghlal
12	MF	Shahin Saghebi	25 August 1993 (aged 22)	(Iran) Tractor Sazi
13	DF	Ali Abdollahzadeh	4 January 1993 (aged 22)	(Iran) Sanat Naft
14	MF	Milad Kamandani	7 July 1994 (aged 21)	(Iran) Persepolis
15	MF	Alireza Naghizadeh	4 March 1993 (aged 22)	(Football Federation Islamic Republic of Iran) Siah Jamegan
18	MF	Hossein Fazeli	12 June 1993 (aged 22)	(Football Federation Islamic Republic of Iran) Sepahan
19	MF	Ehsan Pahlavan	25 July 1993 (aged 22)	(Iran) Zob Ahan
20	FW	Amir Arsalan Motahari	10 March 1993 (aged 22)	(Iran) Naft Tehran
21	DF	Saeb Mohebi	28 August 1993 (aged 22)	(Iran) Zob Ahan
22	GK	Amir Abedzadeh	26 April 1993 (aged 22)	(Iran) Rah Ahan
23	DF	Iman Salimi	1 June 1996 (aged 19)	(Iran) Fajr Sepasi
24	MF	Milad Mohammadi	29 September 1993 (aged 22)	(Iran) Rah Ahan
26	DF	Mohammad Daneshgar	20 January 1994 (aged 21)	(Iran) Naft Tehran
33	GK	Ali Mohsenzadeh	14 February 1993 (aged 22)	(Iran) Khoneh be Khoneh
34	MF	Danial Esmaeilifar	26 February 1993 (aged 22)	(Iran) Zob Ahan
36	FW	Reza Karamolachaab	12 July 1997 (aged 18)	(Iran) Naft MIS
37	DF	Reza Aliari	15 March 1994 (aged 21)	(Iran) Naft Tehran
39	MF	Mahan Rahmani	15 June 1996 (aged 19)	(Iran) Saipa
45	FW	Mehrdad Mohammadi	29 September 1993 (aged 22)	(Iran) Rah Ahan

=== Saudi Arabia ===
Coach: Bandar Juaithen

No.	Pos.	Player	Date of birth (age)	Club
1	GK	Mansour Jawhar	19 March 1995 (aged 20)	(Saudi Arabian Football Federation) Al-Shabab
2	DF	Mazen Othman	21 June 1994 (aged 21)	(Saudi Arabian Football Federation) Al-Ahli
3	DF	Abdullah Madu	15 July 1993 (aged 22)	(Saudi Arabian Football Federation) Al-Nassr
4	DF	Faisel Al-Kharaa	5 December 1993 (aged 21)	(Saudi Arabian Football Federation) Al-Ittihad
5	DF	Nawaf Al-Zaaqi	16 October 1994 (aged 20)	(Saudi Arabian Football Federation) Al-Hilal
6	MF	Rayan Al-Harbi	6 April 1994 (aged 21)	(Saudi Arabian Football Federation) Al-Ahli
7	MF	Abdulmajeed Al-Sulaiheem	15 May 1994 (aged 21)	(Saudi Arabian Football Federation) Al-Shabab
8	FW	Raed Al-Ghamdi	6 May 1994 (aged 21)	(Saudi Arabian Football Federation) Al-Ahli
9	FW	Abdullah Al-Meqbas	13 January 1996 (aged 19)	(Saudi Arabian Football Federation) Al-Shabab
10	MF	Abdulaziz Al-Bishi	11 March 1994 (aged 21)	(Saudi Arabian Football Federation) Al-Shabab
11	FW	Mohammed Al-Saiari	2 May 1993 (aged 22)	(Saudi Arabian Football Federation) Hajer
12	DF	Hatim Belal	30 January 1994 (aged 21)	(Saudi Arabian Football Federation) Al-Wehda
13	DF	Fawaz Al-Sqoor	23 April 1996 (aged 19)	(Saudi Arabian Football Federation) Najran
14	MF	Ryan Al-Mousa	24 July 1994 (aged 21)	(Saudi Arabian Football Federation) Al-Ahli
15	DF	Faisal Hadadi	24 April 1996 (aged 19)	(Saudi Arabian Football Federation) Al-Shabab
16	MF	Abdullah Al-Sobeai	19 December 1993 (aged 21)	(Saudi Arabian Football Federation) Al-Shabab
17	MF	Abdullah Al-Khaibari	16 August 1996 (aged 19)	(Saudi Arabian Football Federation) Al-Shabab
18	MF	Khalid Al-Qattam	4 November 1995 (aged 19)	(Saudi Arabian Football Federation) Al-Hilal
19	DF	Fahad Al-Munaif	10 May 1994 (aged 21)	(Saudi Arabian Football Federation) Al-Faisaly
20	MF	Fahad Al-Jumayah	10 May 1995 (aged 20)	(Saudi Arabian Football Federation) Al-Nassr
21	GK	Marwan Al-Haidari	12 April 1996 (aged 19)	(Saudi Arabian Football Federation) Al-Nahda
22	GK	Abdullah Al-Arraf	3 June 1995 (aged 20)	(Saudi Arabian Football Federation) Al-Wehda
23	DF	Tareq Abdullah	6 September 1995 (aged 20)	(Saudi Arabian Football Federation) Al-Ittihad

== Group C ==
=== Oman ===
Coach: Hamad Al-Azani

No.	Pos.	Player	Date of birth (age)	Club
1	GK	Ahmed Al-Rawahi	5 May 1994 (aged 21)	(Oman Football Association) Al-Nasr
2	DF	Hassan Al-Saadi	22 February 1995 (aged 20)	(Oman Football Association) Suwaiq
3	DF	Mohammed Al-Rawahi	26 April 1993 (aged 22)	(Oman Football Association) Al-Nahda
4	MF	Yaseen al-Sheyadi	5 February 1994 (aged 21)	(Oman Football Association) Suwaiq
5	DF	Nadhir Awadh	5 December 1994 (aged 20)	(Oman Football Association) Dhofar
6	DF	Mahmood Al-Mushaifri	14 January 1993 (aged 22)	(Oman Football Association) Suwaiq
7	MF	Rabia Al-Alawi	31 March 1995 (aged 20)	(Oman Football Association) Sur
8	MF	Omar Al-Malki	4 January 1994 (aged 21)	(Oman Football Association) Al-Nasr
9	FW	Marwan Mubarak	7 April 1996 (aged 19)	(Oman Football Association) Al-Seeb
10	FW	Ahmed Al-Siyabi	16 July 1993 (aged 22)	(Oman Football Association) Sur
11	DF	Amjad Al-Harthi	1 January 1994 (aged 21)	(Oman Football Association) Al-Seeb
12	GK	Dawood Al-Kahali	7 October 1993 (aged 21)	(Oman Football Association) Sohar
13	MF	Khalid Al-Hamdani	20 September 1993 (aged 22)	(Oman Football Association) Fanja
14	MF	Jameel Al-Yahmadi	27 July 1996 (aged 19)	(Oman Football Association) Al-Shabab
15	DF	Maadh Al-Khaldi	25 October 1995 (aged 19)	(Oman Football Association) Saham
16	DF	Muhannad Al-Hasani	10 February 1993 (aged 22)	(Oman Football Association) Al-Nahda
17	MF	Hatem Al-Rushadi	15 February 1996 (aged 19)	(Oman Football Association) Dhofar
18	FW	Abdullah Fawaz	3 October 1996 (aged 18)	(Oman Football Association) Dhofar
19	DF	Thani Al-Rushaidi	16 March 1995 (aged 20)	(Oman Football Association) Saham
20	FW	Azzan Al-Tamtami	21 February 1995 (aged 20)	(Swiss Football Association) Biel-Bienne
21	MF	Yousuf Al-Mukhaini	20 March 1995 (aged 20)	(Oman Football Association) Al-Orouba
22	GK	Bilal Al-Balushi	29 May 1996 (aged 19)	(Oman Football Association) Oman
23	MF	Omar Al-Fazari	19 May 1993 (aged 22)	(Oman Football Association) Sohar

=== Syria ===
Coach: Muhannad Al-Fakeer

No.	Pos.	Player	Date of birth (age)	Club
1	GK	Abdul Latif Nassan	30 January 1993 (aged 22)	(Syrian Football Association) Al-Karamah
2	DF	Momen Naji	9 October 1996 (aged 18)	(Syrian Football Association) Al-Shorta
3	DF	Moayad Ajan	16 February 1993 (aged 22)	(Iraq Football Association) Al-Quwa Al-Jawiya
4	DF	Hussein Jwayed	1 January 1993 (aged 22)	(Iraq Football Association) Al-Zawra'a
5	DF	Omar Midani	26 January 1994 (aged 21)	(Iraq Football Association) Al-Mina'a
6	MF	Amro Jenyat	15 January 1993 (aged 22)	(Syrian Football Association) Al-Karamah
7	MF	Mohammad Marmour	4 January 1995 (aged 20)	(Syrian Football Association) Tishreen
8	FW	Omar Kharbin	15 January 1994 (aged 21)	(United Arab Emirates Football Association) Al-Dhafra
9	FW	Nasouh Al Nakdali	15 June 1993 (aged 22)	(Syrian Football Association) Al-Wahda
10	MF	Mahmoud Mawas	1 January 1993 (aged 22)	(Bahrain Football Association) Al-Riffa
11	MF	Khaled Mobayed	6 May 1993 (aged 22)	(Syrian Football Association) Al-Wahda
12	FW	Salim Sabakji	10 January 1993 (aged 22)	(Syrian Football Association) Hutteen
13	FW	Mahmoud Al Baher	30 January 1994 (aged 21)	(Syrian Football Association) Al-Jaish
14	MF	Ahmed Ashkar	12 December 1996 (aged 18)	(Syrian Football Association) Al-Hurriya
15	DF	Mohamad Sharif	1 January 1995 (aged 20)	(Syrian Football Association) Al-Wahda
16	MF	Ward Al Salama	15 July 1994 (aged 21)	(Syrian Football Association) Al-Fotuwa
17	DF	Abdullah Al Shami	2 March 1994 (aged 21)	(Syrian Football Association) Al-Taliya
18	DF	Jihad Busmar	30 October 1996 (aged 18)	(Syrian Football Association) Al-Karamah
19	MF	Mohamad Ahmad	8 January 1994 (aged 21)	(Syrian Football Association) Al-Ittihad
20	MF	Yousef Kalfa	14 May 1993 (aged 22)	(Syrian Football Association) Al-Jaish
21	MF	Ahmad Al Shamali	15 August 1994 (aged 21)	(Syrian Football Association) Hutteen
22	GK	Shaher Shakir	21 March 1993 (aged 22)	(Syrian Football Association) Al-Hurriya
23	GK	Ahmad Kanaan	6 May 1995 (aged 20)	(Syrian Football Association) Al-Muhafaza SC

=== United Arab Emirates ===
Coach: Abdullah Mesfer

No.	Pos.	Player	Date of birth (age)	Club
1	GK	Ahmed Shambih	20 December 1993 (aged 21)	(United Arab Emirates Football Association) Al-Nasr
2	DF	Khalifa Mubarak	30 October 1993 (aged 21)	(United Arab Emirates Football Association) Al-Nasr
3	DF	Hussain Abbas	30 November 1994 (aged 20)	(United Arab Emirates Football Association) Al-Nasr
4	MF	Ahmed Barman	5 February 1994 (aged 21)	(United Arab Emirates Football Association) Al-Ain
5	FW	Salem Saeed Salem	25 January 1993 (aged 22)	(United Arab Emirates Football Association) Al-Dhafra
6	DF	Saif Khalfan	31 January 1993 (aged 22)	(United Arab Emirates Football Association) Al-Jazira
7	MF	Saif Rashid	25 November 1994 (aged 20)	(United Arab Emirates Football Association) Al-Sharjah
8	DF	Saeed Ahmed Abdulla	17 January 1994 (aged 21)	(United Arab Emirates Football Association) Al-Ain
9	FW	Ibrahim Al-Mesmari	27 June 1993 (aged 22)	(United Arab Emirates Football Association) Al-Fujairah
10	FW	Khalfan Mubarak	9 May 1995 (aged 20)	(United Arab Emirates Football Association) Al-Jazira
11	MF	Ahmed Rabee	14 August 1995 (aged 20)	(United Arab Emirates Football Association) Al-Jazira
13	FW	Sultan Saif	10 June 1993 (aged 22)	(United Arab Emirates Football Association) Al-Wahda
14	MF	Abdullah Kazim	31 July 1996 (aged 19)	(United Arab Emirates Football Association) Al-Wasl
15	MF	Abdullah Al-Naqbi	28 April 1993 (aged 22)	(United Arab Emirates Football Association) Al-Dhafra
16	DF	Sultan Al-Sowaidi	26 November 1993 (aged 21)	(United Arab Emirates Football Association) Al-Jazira
17	GK	Hassan Hamza	10 November 1994 (aged 20)	(United Arab Emirates Football Association) Al-Shabab
18	MF	Mohamed Surour	31 October 1993 (aged 21)	(United Arab Emirates Football Association) Al-Sharjah
20	DF	Abdurahman Ali	2 January 1993 (aged 22)	(United Arab Emirates Football Association) Al-Shabab
21	DF	Saeed Musabbeh	4 February 1994 (aged 21)	(United Arab Emirates Football Association) Al-Ain
23	DF	Abdullah Ghanem	21 May 1995 (aged 20)	(United Arab Emirates Football Association) Al-Sharjah
24	MF	Bader Al-Harthi	2 April 1994 (aged 21)	(United Arab Emirates Football Association) Al-Wahda
25	DF	Mohammed Sabeel	13 April 1993 (aged 22)	(United Arab Emirates Football Association) Al-Ahli
40	GK	Sultan Al-Mantheri	5 January 1995 (aged 20)	(United Arab Emirates Football Association) Dibba Al Fujairah
