= West Bank Premier League =

Association football league in Palestine

- Founded: 1944; 82 years ago
- Country: Palestine
- Confederation: PFA
- Number of clubs: 12
- Level on pyramid: 1
- Relegation to: West Bank First League
- Domestic cup(s): Palestine Cup; Yasser Arafat Cup
- International cup(s): AFC Cup; Arab Champions League
- Current champions: Jabal Al-Mukaber (2022–23)
- Most championships: Shabab Al-Khalil (7)
- Top scorer: (Palestine) Sameh Maraaba (108 goals)
- Website: pfa.ps
- Current: 2025–26 West Bank Premier League

The West Bank Premier League is one of the two top divisions of the Palestinian Football Association (PFA); the other is the Gaza Strip Premier League.

Palestinian clubs date back to the early 1930s, but most teams folded due to political turmoil and ensuing reduction of the geographical area of the country. Over the years, the format of the league has taken many different shapes. It was most recently contested in 2022–23.

== History ==
=== Pre-officialization (1970s–2000s) ===
- In 1977, Silwan won a five-team league on 28 points ahead of Al-Arabi Beit Safafa, YMCA, Al-Bireh Group, and Shabab Al-Khaleel.
- In 1982, Shabab Al-Khaleel won a 24-team league on 81 points five points ahead of closest challengers YMCA.
- In 1984, Markaz Tulkarem won a 12-team league on 60 points one point ahead of closest challengers Hateen.
- In 1985, Shabab Al-Khaleel won their second league title, the league once again featured 12 teams. Shabab Al-Khaleel finished on 60 points, six ahead of Thaqafi Tulkarm.
- In 1997, Markaz Shabab Al-Am'ari won their first league title on 64 points, the league featured 16 teams, Thaqafi Tulkarm finished as runner-up on 53 points.
- In 2008–09, Taraji Wadi Al-Nes won a 22-team league that would determine the members of the First and Second Division. They collected 49 points from 21 games.
- In 2009–10 Jabal Al-Mukaber won a 12-team league, the last before the PFA instituted a professional set-up. They collected 49 points from 22 games, 7 more than their closest challengers Hilal Al-Quds.

=== Emergence of high-profile signings (2010s) ===
The 2010–11 season marked the creation of the first professional league in the territories and saw high-profile signings for many clubs. Most notably Fadi Lafi of the Hilal Al-Quds, and Hernán Madrid of Wadi Al-Nes, and many Palestinians-Israelis who played for teams in the second and third tier of Israeli football.

The original format of the WBPL consisted of 12 teams playing each other twice over 22 matchdays, the bottom two clubs are relegated to the second division and the team with the most points are crowned champions.

The 2011–12 included only 10 teams but the PFA announced that four teams will be promoted from the First Division returning the league to its traditional 12-team format. The PFA also altered the rules on player eligibility banning the use of foreign players but letting teams have an unlimited amount of Arab Israeli citizens in their squads

== Clubs ==
Season 2022–23 clubs:

| Club | Coach | City | Captain | 2021–22 season | Notes |
|---|---|---|---|---|---|
| Ahli Al-Khaleel | | Hebron | | West Bank First League, 2nd | |
| Hilal Al-Quds | Jamal Mahmoud | East Jerusalem | Fadi Lafi | 3rd | |
| Islami Qalqilya | | Qalqilya | | 6th | |
| Jabal Al-Mukaber | | East Jerusalem | | 2nd | |
| Markaz Balata | | Nablus | | 5th | |
| Mosaset Al-Bireh | | Al-Bireh | | 9th | |
| Shabab Al-Am'ari | | Am'ari | | 10th | |
| Shabab Al-Dhahiriya | | Ad-Dhahiriya | | 7th | |
| Shabab Al-Khalil | | Hebron | | 1st (Champions) | |
| Shabab Alsamu | | Al Samu | | 4th | |
| Taraji Wadi Al-Nes | | Bethlehem | | West Bank First League, 1st | |
| Thaqafi Tulkarm | Miha | Tulkarem | Osama Sabah | 8th | |

== Past champions ==
The winners were:

- 1977: Silwan
- 1982: Shabab Al-Khalil
- 1984: Markaz Tulkarem
- 1985: Shabab Al-Khalil (2)
- 1986: Shabab Al-Khalil (3)
- 1997: Markaz Shabab Al-Am'ari
- 1999: Shabab Al-Khalil (4)
- 2000: Wadi Al-Nes
- 2006: Markaz Tulkarem (2)
- 2007: Wadi Al-Nes (2)
- 2008–09: Taraji Wadi Al-Nes
- 2009–10: Jabal Al-Mukaber Club
- 2010–11: Markaz Shabab Al-Am'ari (2)
- 2011–12: Hilal Al-Quds
- 2012–13: Shabab Al-Dhahiriya
- 2013–14: Taraji Wadi Al-Nes (2)
- 2014–15: Shabab Al-Dhahiriya (2)
- 2015–16: Shabab Al-Khalil (5)
- 2016–17: Hilal Al-Quds (2)
- 2017–18: Hilal Al-Quds (3)
- 2018–19: Hilal Al-Quds (4)
- 2019–20: Markaz Balata
- 2020–21: Shabab Al-Khalil (6)
- 2021–22: Shabab Al-Khalil (7)
- 2022–23: Jabal Al-Mukaber (2)
- 2023–24: Cancelled
- 2024–25: Not Held

== Top goalscorers ==
| Season | Scorer | Team | Goals |
|---|---|---|---|
| 2020–21 | (Palestine) Shehab Qumbor | Jabal Al-Mukaber | 15 |
| 2021–22 | (Palestine) Shehab Qumbor | Jabal Al-Mukaber | 24 |
| 2022–23 | (Palestine) Sameh Maraaba | Hilal Al-Quds | 21 |

== Multiple hat-tricks ==
| Rank | Country | Player | Hat-tricks |
|---|---|---|---|
| 1 | (Palestine) | Sameh Maraaba | 4 |
| 2 | (Palestine) | Shehab Qanbar | 3 |
| 3 | (Palestine) | Mahmoud Abu Warda | 1 |
| 3 | (Palestine) | Rashid Adwi | 1 |
| 3 | (Jordan) | Aref Al Haj | 1 |
| 3 | (Palestine) | Mahmoud Al Iwisat | 1 |
| 3 | (Palestine) | Mohammed Al Jaabari | 1 |
| 3 | (Palestine) | Wael Awawdeh | 1 |
| 3 | (Palestine) | Shaher Daoud | 1 |
| 3 | (Palestine) | Oday Mohammad Hamad | 1 |
| 3 | (Palestine) | Hamza Issa | 1 |
| 3 | (Palestine) | Zaid Qunbar | 1 |
| 3 | (Palestine) | Khaled Salem | 1 |
| 3 | | Musa Tarabin | 1 |
