= Rami Hamada =

Palestinian footballer

Personal information
- Full name: Rami Kamal Anes Hamada
- Date of birth: 24 March 1994 (age 32)
- Place of birth: Shefa-'Amr, Israel
- Height: 1.82 m (6 ft 0 in)
- Position: Goalkeeper

Youth career
- Hapoel Shefa-'Amr
- Maccabi Netanya

Senior career*
Years	Team	Apps	(Gls)
2012–2014	Thaqafi Tulkarem	44	(0)
2014–2015	Shabab Al-Khader	22	(0)
2015–2017	Thaqafi Tulkarem	44	(0)
2017–2020	Hilal Al-Quds	65	(0)
2020–2021	Bnei Sakhnin	4	(0)
2021–2022	Shabab Al-Khalil	21	(0)
2022–2023	Jabal Al-Mukaber	18	(0)
2025	Al-Markhiya	8	(0)
2026	Umm Salal	6	(0)

International career^{‡}
2011	Palestine U19	3	(0)
2012–2018	Palestine U23	18	(0)
2013–	Palestine	68	(0)
- * Club domestic league appearances and goals as of 4 December 2025 ‡ National team caps and goals as of 14 November 2026

Rami Hamada (also Hamadeh or Hamadi, Arabic: رامي حمادة, born 24 March 1994) is a footballer who plays as a goalkeeper. Born in Israel, he played for the Palestine national team. He is Palestine's all time leader in clean sheets, having recorded 29 over the course of his national team career.

== Club career ==
Hamada began his career playing for Hapoel Shfar'am before moving to Maccabi Netanya.

He signed his first pro contract in 2012, when he joined the Palestinian side Thaqafi Tulkarem. Hamada left Tulkarem for a one-season spell at Shabab Al-Khader SC in 2014, before coming back and playing for Tulkarem until 2017. In his final season with Thaqafi Tulkarem, Hamada set a record for clean sheets in a season- registering 14 whilst only conceding 19 goals in 22 games. His season also featured a streak of six games without conceding a goal.

In 2017, Hamada signed for Hilal Al-Quds, with which he won the double in 2017-18, and was voted best goalkeeper two consecutive seasons. In his first season with Hilal Al-Quds, Hamada set a record for fewest goals conceded in a league season- allowing only 9 in 21 games.

This success drew the attention of bigger clubs, and in 2020 Hamada signed a two-season contract with Israeli Premier League club Bnei Sakhnin.

In March 2021, Hamada made history as the first active West Bank Premier League player to be called up to the Palestinian National Team.

For the 2021–22 season, Hamada signed with Shabab Al-Khaleel and helped them win the 2021–22 West Bank Premier League title. The goalkeeper broke his own records for most clean sheets in a season, registering 15 while also setting a new mark for fewest goals conceded, seven, in a league campaign.

On 11 January 2025, Hamada sign a contract with Qatari Second Division club, Al Markhiya.

== International career ==
=== Youth ===
At 17, Hamada was called into his first national team youth team. He played three out of four qualifiers for the 2012 AFC U-19 Championship, missing the final qualifier due to yellow card accumulation conceding four goals in three games and making a number of outstanding saves to keep the overmatched Palestinians in games against Syria, UAE, and Lebanon.

In 2012, he was called up to the U-22 side in their quest to qualify for the 2013 AFC U-22 Championship and served as the back-up to Ghanem Mahajneh.

In 2013, he was called up to face Jordan in an unofficial friendly and came on in the 81st minute in place of Ramzi Saleh.

The following year, he made waves in a friendly vs. Brazil, holding the opposition scoreless for 60 minutes and saving a penalty from Ademilson.

Hamada was the starting goalkeeper at the 2014 Asian Games in Incheon and played a key role in Palestine winning its first ever games at the competition and advancing to the knockout round for the first time.

=== Senior ===
In 2015, Hamada was the youngest member of Palestine's 2015 AFC Asian Cup squad but did not play. He became Palestine's starting goalkeeper during the 2016/17 season in which he conceded a mere 9 league goals in 21 games for Thaqafi Tulkarem. His first official national team cap came in a friendly against Yemen on 22 March 2017. He kept a clean sheet in his first three games - becoming the first Palestinian goalkeeper to do so. In his first 10 national team caps, Hamada kept 6 clean sheets, recording six victories, two draws, and two losses.

In 2018, he was called as one of three overage players to Palestine's 2018 Asian Games squad.

In 2021, Hamada surpassed Ramzi Saleh by recording his 17th clean sheet in a World Cup Qualifier against Yemen.

On 1 January 2024, he was named in the Palestinian squad for the 2023 AFC Asian Cup in Qatar.

On 5 September 2024 he started for Palestine in the 2026 World Cup qualifiers against South Korea. His saves kept the score at 0-0 making him the only goalkeeper so far who have kept a clean sheet against South Korea.

== Honours ==
- West Bank Premier League

Winner (4): 2017–18, 2018-19, 2021-22, 2022-23

- Palestine Cup

Winner (1): 2017–18

- Palestine Super Cup

Winner (2): 2018, 2019

Individual

- WBPL Golden Glove

Winner (3): 2016/17, 2017/18, 2021/22
