= 2018–19 West Bank Premier League =

West Bank Premier League
- Season: 2018–19
- Matches: 120
- Goals: 319 (2.66 per match)
- Biggest home win: Markaz Balata 5–1 Shabab Al-Dhahiriya (14 September 2018); Hilal Al-Quds 5–1 Taraji Wadi Al-Nes (27 October 2018); Shabab Al-Samu 4–0 Markaz Tulkarem (27 October 2018); Hilal Al-Quds 5–1 Shabab Al-Bireh (8 November 2018); Ahli Al-Khaleel 4–0 Markaz Tulkarem (29 March 2019)
- Biggest away win: Markaz Shabab Al-Am'ari 1–6 Hilal Al-Quds (25 April 2019)
- Highest scoring: Shabab Al-Dhahiriya 3–4 Shabab Al-Samu (19 April 2019); Markaz Shabab Al-Am'ari 1–6 Hilal Al-Quds (25 April 2019)

The 2018–19 West Bank Premier League is the 16th season of the West Bank Premier League, the top football league in the West Bank of Palestine. The season started on 30 August 2018.

== Teams ==
=== Pre-season ===
A total of 12 teams compete in the league. Hilal Al-Quds are the defending champions. Shabab Al-Khadr and Duwwara were relegated from last season, and were replaced by promoted teams Markaz Shabab Al-Am'ari and Markaz Tulkarem.

=== Stadia and location ===
Team	Location	Stadium	Capacity
Ahli Al-Khaleel	Hebron	Hussein Bin Ali Stadium	8,000
Hilal Al-Quds	Al-Ram	Faisal Al-Husseini International Stadium	12,500
Jabal Al-Mukaber	Al-Ram	Faisal Al-Husseini International Stadium	12,500
Markaz Balata	Nablus	Nablus Football Stadium	4,000
Markaz Shabab Al-Am'ari	Al-Ram	Faisal Al-Husseini International Stadium	12,500
Markaz Tulkarem	Tulkarm	Jamal Ghanem Stadium	4,000
Shabab Al-Bireh	Al-Bireh	Faisal Al-Husseini International Stadium	12,500
Shabab Al-Dhahiriya	Hebron (ad-Dhahiriya)	Dora International Stadium	18,000
Shabab Al-Khalil	Hebron	Hussein Bin Ali Stadium	8,000
Shabab Al-Samu	Hebron	Hussein Bin Ali Stadium	8,000
Thaqafi Tulkarem	Tulkarm	Jamal Ghanem Stadium	4,000
Taraji Wadi Al-Nes	Wadi Al-Nes	Al-Khader Stadium	6,000

== League table ==
Pos	Team	Pld	W	D	L	GF	GA	GD	Pts	Qualification or relegation
1	Hilal Al-Quds (C)	22	13	6	3	49	19	+30	45	Qualification for AFC Cup play-off round
2	Shabab Al-Khalil	22	13	5	4	29	18	+11	44	
3	Markaz Balata	22	13	4	5	38	21	+17	43	
4	Shabab Al-Samu	22	10	5	7	41	32	+9	35	
5	Ahli Al-Khaleel	22	10	5	7	28	20	+8	35	
6	Taraji Wadi Al-Nes	22	10	4	8	32	27	+5	34	
7	Shabab Al-Bireh	22	9	4	9	33	35	−2	31	
8	Thaqafi Tulkarem	22	8	6	8	24	27	−3	30	
9	Jabal Mukabar	22	7	3	12	24	34	−10	24	
10	Markaz Shabab Al-Am'ari	22	7	3	12	21	33	−12	24	
11	Shabab Al-Dhahiriya (R)	22	3	6	13	15	33	−18	15	Relegation to West Bank First League
12	Markaz Tulkarem (R)	22	2	3	17	11	46	−35	9	Relegation to West Bank First League

Source: Goalzz
Rules for classification: 1) Points; 2) Goal difference; 3) Goals scored; 4) Play-offs (only if needed to decide champion, teams for relegation or teams for AFC competitions)
(C) Champions; (R) Relegated

== See also ==
- 2018–19 Gaza Strip Premier League
- 2018–19 Palestine Cup
