= 2016–17 West Bank Premier League =

Palestine - West Bank League
- Season: 2016–17
- Champions: Hilal Al-Quds
- Relegated: Shabab Yatta
- Top goalscorer: Mohammad Marab'a (11 goals)
- Biggest home win: Shabab Alsamu 8–1 Markaz Tulkarm (Dec 10)
- Biggest away win: Markaz Tulkarm 0-5 Thaqafi Tulkarm (Nov 24)
- Highest scoring: Ahli Al-Khalil 7-2 Shabab Yatta (Apr 26)

The 2016–17 West Bank Premier League was the 14th season of the top football league in the West Bank of Palestine. Hilal Al-Quds won the 2016–17 title by finishing top of the league table.

== Teams ==
- Ahli Al-Khaleel
- Hilal Al-Quds
- Markaz Balata
- Markaz Tulkarm
- Shabab Al-Dhahiriya
- Shabab Al-Khadr
- Shabab Al-Khalil
- Shabab Alsamu
- Shabab Dura
- Shabab Yatta
- Taraji Wadi Al-Nes
- Thaqafi Tulkarm

== League table ==
Pos	Team	Pld	W	D	L	GF	GA	GD	Pts	Qualification or relegation
1	Hilal Al-Quds (C)	22	14	4	4	38	17	+21	46	Qualification to 2018 AFC Cup play-off round
2	Thaqafi Tulkarm	22	11	6	5	34	19	+15	39	
3	Ahli Al-Khaleel	22	11	6	5	35	21	+14	39	
4	Shabab Alsamu	22	10	7	5	35	23	+12	37	
5	Markaz Balata	22	9	8	5	23	18	+5	35	
6	Shabab Al-Khalil	22	9	7	6	26	18	+8	34	
7	Shabab Al-Dhahiriya	22	7	4	11	22	29	−7	25	
8	Shabab Al-Khadr	22	5	9	8	22	24	−2	24	
9	Taraji Wadi Al-Nes	22	6	6	10	22	31	−9	24	
10	Shabab Dura	22	6	6	10	17	26	−9	24	
11	Markaz Tulkarm	22	5	6	11	30	45	−15	21	Relegation to the West Bank First League
12	Shabab Yatta (R)	22	2	5	15	20	53	−33	11	Relegation to the West Bank First League

Updated to match(es) played on 6 May 2017. Source: FansRepublic
Rules for classification: 1) points; 2) goal difference; 3) number of goals scored.
(C) Champions; (R) Relegated

== See also ==
- 2016-17 Gaza Strip Premier League
- 2016–17 Palestine Cup
