= Vincenzo Alberto Annese =

Italian football manager (born 1984)

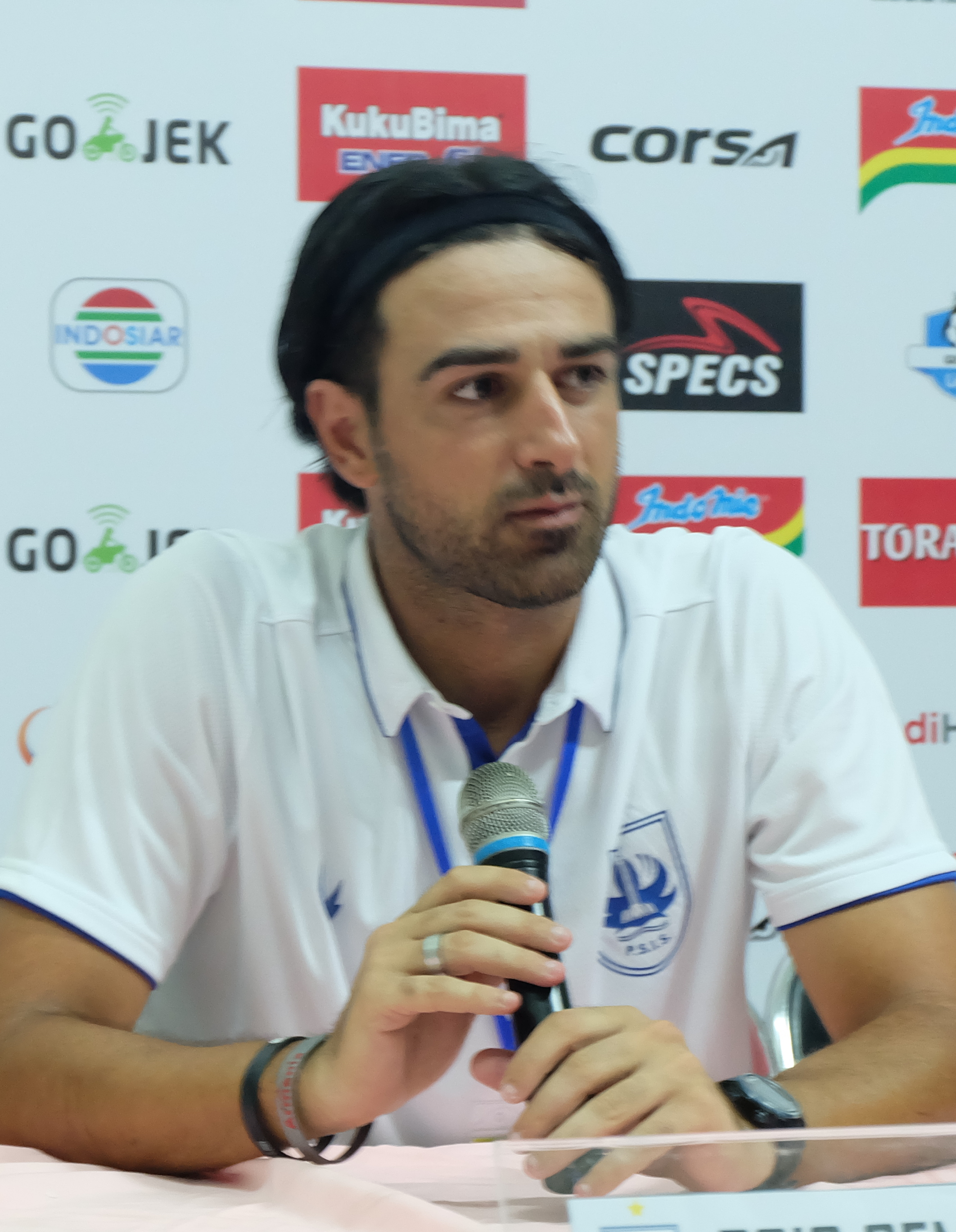
- Annese in 2018

Personal information
- Date of birth: 22 September 1984 (age 42)
- Place of birth: Bisceglie, Italy
- Height: 1.83 m (6 ft 0 in)
- Position: Midfielder

Team information
- Current team: Equatorial Guinea (head coach)

Senior career*
Years	Team	Apps	(Gls)
1999–2001	Venezia		
2001–2002	Martina Franca	20	(1)
2002–2003	Noicattaro		
2003–2004	Leonessa Altamura		
Total		23	(1)

Managerial career
- 2010: Molfetta
- 2014: JFK Saldus
- 2015: FC Banants
- 2015–2016: Armenia U19
- 2016: JFK Saldus
- 2017: Bechem United
- 2017–2018: Ahli Al-Khaleel
- 2018: PSIS Semarang
- 2018–2019: Liria Prizren
- 2019–2020: Belize
- 2020–2022: Gokulam Kerala
- 2022–2023: NorthEast United
- 2023–2024: Nepal
- 2025: Afghanistan
- 2025–2026: Burkina Faso (technical director)
- 2026–: Equatorial Guinea
- * Club domestic league appearances and goals

Vincenzo Alberto Annese (born 22 September 1984) is an Italian professional football manager and former player. He is currently coaching the Equatorial Guinea national team

After beginning his coaching career in Italy, Annese managed clubs and national teams in Latvia, Armenia, Ghana, Palestine, Indonesia, Kosovo, Belize, India, Nepal Afghanistan and Burkina Faso. He won two consecutive I-League titles with Gokulam Kerala.

== Early life ==
Annese began his football career as a midfielder for the youth team of Venezia. He later played for Martina Franca, Noicattaro and Leonessa Altamura.

After a brief playing career, Annese attended the Higher Institute of Physical Education (ISEF) at the Università degli studi di Foggia and the University of Verona, focusing on the adaptation of sports to disabled people.

== Coaching career ==
=== Early career ===
Annese began his coaching career in the youth team of Fidelis Andria in 2010. In 2012, he joined Foggia as part of the coaching staff during the 2012–13 and 2013–14 seasons. Between 2015 and 2016, he worked abroad in Latvia with JFK Saldus and with the Armenia U-19 and U-17 national teams.

=== Bechem United ===
In January 2017, Annese was appointed as the head coach of Ghanaian Premier League club Bechem United for the 2017 season. Under his management, the club finished as runner-up in the Ghana Super Cup.

=== Ahli Al-Khaleel ===
On 25 July 2017, Annese joined West Bank Premier League club Ahli Al-Khaleel on a one-year deal as the head coach. He led the club to the finals of 2016–17 Palestine Cup and 2017 West Bank Super Cup.

=== PSIS Semarang ===
For the 2018 season, Annese was appointed head coach of Liga 1 club PSIS Semarang.

=== Belize ===
On 17 June 2019, Annese signed a one-year contract to become head coach of the Belize national football team.

=== Gokulam Kerala ===
On 19 August 2020, Annese joined I-League club Gokulam Kerala. Under him, the club won their first I-League title in the 2020–21 season and qualified for the 2022 AFC Cup group stage. During his tenure, the club achieved a 21-match unbeaten run in the I-League. Under his management, Gokulam Kerala won the 2021–22 I-League title, becoming the first club to win consecutive I-League titles. He received the 2021–22 I-League Best Coach award.

At the 2022 AFC Cup group stage opener, Gokulam Kerala recorded a 4–2 win against Indian Super League club ATK Mohun Bagan. On 1 June 2022, Annese announced that he would not continue with Gokulam Kerala.

=== NorthEast United ===
On 8 December 2022, Annese was appointed Indian Super League club NorthEast United as the new head coach after the club sacked Marco Balbul mid-season.

=== Nepal ===
On 1 March 2023, the All Nepal Football Association appointed him as head coach of the national team. Later that year, Nepal won the 2023 Prime Minister's Three Nations Cup defeating Laos in the final.

=== Afghanistan ===
On 25 June 2025, Annese was hired as the new head coach of the Afghanistan national football team.

=== Burkina Faso ===
On 28 October 2025, Annese signed a one-year contract with the Burkina Faso national football team as the technical director.

=== Equatorial Guinea ===
On 26 August 2026, Annese was hired as the new head coach of the Equatorial Guinea national football team for the next two years.

== Managerial statistics ==
As of match played 16 November 2026

Managerial record by team and tenure
Team	Nat	From	To	Record								Ref.
Team	Nat	From	To	M	W	D	L	GF	GA	GD	Win %	Ref.
JFK Saldus	(Latvia)	1 April 2016	31 December 2016	3	0	0	3	1	4	−3	0.00	
Bechem United	(Ghana)	13 January 2017	22 June 2017	15	6	4	5	16	15	+1	40.00	
Ahli Al-Khaleel	(Palestine)	25 July 2017	15 March 2018	21	12	8	1	35	15	+20	57.14	
PSIS Semarang	(Indonesia)	26 March 2018	22 August 2018	19	5	5	9	18	25	−7	26.32	
Liria Prizren	(Kosovo)	12 November 2018	2 March 2019	6	1	1	4	4	12	−8	16.67	
Belize	(Belize)	17 June 2019	20 June 2020	6	2	1	3	7	10	−3	33.33	
Gokulam Kerala	(India)	19 August 2020	31 May 2022	40	25	7	8	90	42	+48	62.50	
NorthEast United	(India)	8 December 2022	1 March 2023	12	1	2	9	16	37	−21	8.33	
Nepal	(Nepal)	1 March 2023	30 November 2024	19	5	4	10	12	35	−23	26.32	
Afghanistan	(Afghanistan)	1 January 2025	27 October 2025	6	0	3	3	2	7	−5	0.00	
Equatorial Guinea	(Equatorial Guinea)	26 August 2026		4	1	1	2	1	5	−4	25.00	
Total				142	57	33	52	200	194	+6	40.14	

== Honours ==
=== Manager ===
Bechem United

- Ghana Super Cup: 2017

Ahli Al-Khaleel

- Palestine Cup runner-up: 2016–17
- West Bank Super Cup runner-up: 2017

Gokulam Kerala

- I-League: 2020–21, 2021–22

Nepal

- 2023 Prime Minister's Three Nations Cup

Individual

- Syed Abdul Rahim Award (I-League Best Coach): 2021–22
