= 2015–16 West Bank Premier League =

West Bank Premier League
- Season: 2015–16
- Champions: Shabab Al-Khalil (1st title)
- Relegated: Markaz Shabab Al-Am'ari
- AFC Cup: Shabab Al-Khalil

The 2015–16 West Bank Premier League was the 13th season of the top-flight football league in Palestine. Shabab Al-Dhahiriya were the defending, having won their second championship the previous season.

== Teams ==
- Ahli Al-Khaleel
- Hilal Al-Quds
- Markaz Balata
- Markaz Shabab Al-Am'ari
- Shabab Al-Dhahiriya
- Shabab Al-Khadr
- Shabab Al-Khalil
- Shabab Alsamu
- Shabab Dura
- Silwan
- Taraji Wadi Al-Nes
- Thaqafi Tulkarm

== League table ==
Pos	Team	Pld	W	D	L	GF	GA	GD	Pts	Qualification or relegation
1	Shabab Al-Khalil (C)	20	13	5	2	36	19	+17	44	Qualification to 2017 AFC Cup play-off round and 2016–17 Arab Club Championship preliminary round 2
2	Shabab Al-Khadr	22	10	6	6	42	32	+10	36	
3	Shabab Alsamu	21	7	8	6	27	26	+1	29	
4	Shabab Al-Dhahiriya	21	7	7	7	34	28	+6	28	
5	Ahli Al-Khaleel	21	7	7	7	21	19	+2	28	
6	Thaqafi Tulkarm	21	6	9	6	29	31	−2	27	
7	Markaz Balata	21	7	6	8	29	39	−10	27	
8	Taraji Wadi Al-Nes	21	6	8	7	22	26	−4	26	
9	Silwan	21	5	10	6	18	25	−7	25	
10	Hilal Al-Quds	21	6	6	9	22	21	+1	24	
11	Shabab Dura	21	5	7	9	20	28	−8	22	Relegation to the West Bank First League
12	Markaz Shabab Al-Am'ari (R)	21	4	7	10	19	25	−6	19	Relegation to the West Bank First League

Updated to match(es) played on 14 May 2016. Source: Soccerway
Rules for classification: 1) points; 2) goal difference; 3) number of goals scored.
(C) Champions; (R) Relegated
