= 1996 Arab Club Champions Cup =

بطولة الأندية العربية لأبطال الدوري 1996

Tournament details
- Host country: Egypt
- City: Cairo
- Dates: 4–15 September
- Teams: 7 (from 1 association)
- Venue: 1 (in 1 host city)

Final positions
- Champions: (Egypt) Al-Ahly (1st title)
- Runners-up: (Morocco) Raja Casablanca

Tournament statistics
- Matches played: 12
- Goals scored: 48 (4 per match)
- Top scorer: (Morocco) Salaheddine Bassir (9 goals)
- Best goalkeeper: (Egypt) Ahmed Shobair
- Fair play award: (Palestine) Shabab Rafah

The 1996 Arab Club Champions Cup edition, was won by Egyptian side Al-Ahly, the hosts. It was the 12th tournament and was held from 4 September to 15 September 1996.

== Final tournament ==
=== Group stage ===
The seven teams were drawn into two groups of four and three. Each group was played on one leg basis. The winners and runners-up of each group advanced to the semi-finals.

==== Group A ====
Team	Pld	W	D	L	GF	GA	GD	Pts
(Egypt) Al-Ahly	2	2	0	0	12	1	+11	6
(Palestine) Shabab Rafah	2	1	0	1	1	7	−6	3
(Algeria) USM Blida	2	0	0	2	1	6	−5	0

4 September 1996

Al-Ahly (Egypt)	5–1	(Algeria) USM Blida
Mosheer; H.Hassan; Walid; Koushary; Gharib		44' Réda Zouani

Cairo International Stadium, Cairo, Egypt

Al-Ahly (Egypt)	7 – 0	(Palestine) Shabab Rafah
Koushary; I. Hassan; Tolba

Cairo International Stadium, Cairo, Egypt

7 September 1996

Shabab Rafah (Palestine)	1 – 0	(Algeria) USM Blida

Cairo International Stadium, Cairo, Egypt

==== Group B ====
Team	Pld	W	D	L	GF	GA	GD	Pts
(Morocco) Raja Casablanca	3	2	1	0	10	1	+9	7
(Saudi Arabia) Al-Hilal (Riyadh)	3	1	1	1	4	2	+2	4
(Sudan) Al-Hilal Club	3	1	0	2	3	8	−5	3
(Jordan) Al-Wehdat	3	1	0	2	3	9	−6	3

Al-Hilal Club (Sudan)	2 – 3	(Jordan) Al-Wehdat

Cairo International Stadium, Cairo, Egypt

Al-Hilal (Saudi Arabia)	1 – 1	(Morocco) Raja Casablanca

Cairo International Stadium, Cairo, Egypt

Raja Casablanca (Morocco)	4 – 0	(Jordan) Al-Wehdat

Cairo International Stadium, Cairo, Egypt

Al-Hilal (Saudi Arabia)	0 – 1	(Sudan) Al-Hilal Club
		Walieldin

Cairo International Stadium, Cairo, Egypt

Al-Hilal Club (Sudan)	0 – 5	(Morocco) Raja Casablanca

Cairo International Stadium, Cairo, Egypt

Al-Hilal (Saudi Arabia)	3 – 0	(Jordan) Al-Wehdat

Cairo International Stadium, Cairo, Egypt

=== Knockout stage ===
Semi-finals
– Cairo
(Egypt) Al-Ahly (aet)	2
(Saudi Arabia) Al-Hilal	1
– Cairo
(Morocco) Raja Casablanca	7
(Palestine) Shabab Rafah	0

Final
16 september – Cairo
(Egypt) Al-Ahly	3
(Morocco) Raja Casablanca	1

==== Semi-finals ====
Al-Ahly (Egypt)	2 – 1 (a.e.t.)	(Saudi Arabia) Al-Hilal
Tolba 64'; Nakhla Golden Goal'		45+7'

Cairo International Stadium, Cairo

Raja Casablanca (Morocco)	7 – 0	(Palestine) Shabab Rafah

Cairo International Stadium, Cairo

==== Final ====
16 September 1996

Al-Ahly (Egypt)	3 – 1	(Morocco) Raja CA
Tolba 2'; Khashaba 49' (pen.); Walid 89'		Bassir 27'

Cairo International Stadium, Cairo

== Winners ==
1996 Arab Club Champions Cup
(Egypt)
Al-Ahly
First title
