= 2021–22 West Bank Premier League =

West Bank Premier League
- Season: 2021–22
- Dates: 14 September 2021 – 19 April 2022
- Champions: Shabab Al-Khalil (7th title)
- Relegated: Tubas; Markaz Tulkarm
- Matches: 132
- Goals: 397 (3.01 per match)
- Top goalscorer: Shehab Qumbor (24 goals)
- Best goalkeeper: Rami Hamadeh (14 clean sheets)
- Biggest home win: Hilal Al-Quds 8–1 Thaqafi Tulkarm (15 March 2022)
- Biggest away win: Shabab Al-Dhahiriya 1–6 Jabal Al-Mukaber (15 April 2022)
- Highest scoring: Hilal Al-Quds 8–1 Thaqafi Tulkarm (15 March 2022); Jabal Al-Mukaber 6–3 Shabab Al-Dhahiriya (1 January 2022)
- Longest winning run: 6 matches Shabab Al-Khalil; Jabal Al-Mukaber
- Longest unbeaten run: 22 matches Shabab Al-Khalil

The 2021–22 West Bank Premier League was the 19th season of the West Bank Premier League, one of the two top Palestinian professional leagues for association football clubs, since its establishment in 1944. The season started on 14 September 2021 and is concluded on 19 April 2022.

Shabab Al-Khalil are the defending champions, having won their 6th league title in the previous season.

== Teams ==
Location football club of West Bank Premier League

Twelve teams are competing in the league - the top ten teams from the previous season, and two teams promoted from the 2020-2021 West Bank First League.

=== Venues ===
A total of 3 stadiums in 3 governorates were selected by clubs to host their 2021–22 home fixtures.

Shabab Al-Khalil	Hilal Al-Quds	Markaz Balata
Dura International Stadium	Faisal Al-Husseini International Stadium	Arab American International Stadium
Capacity: 18,000	Capacity: 12,500	Capacity: 10,000
Dora International Stadium 01		
Islami Qalqilyah	Thaqafi Tulkarem	Markaz Tulkarem
Qalqilya Municipal stadium	Jammal Ghanem stadium	Jammal Ghanem stadium
Capacity: 3,000	Capacity: 4,000	Capacity: 4,000
Shabab Alsamu	Jabal Al-Mukaber	Tubas
Hussein Bin Ali Stadium	Faisal Al-Husseini International Stadium	Arab American International Stadium
Capacity: 8,000	Capacity: 12,500	Capacity: 10,000
Al-Bireh Institute	Shabab Al-Am'ari	Shabab Al-Dhahiriya
Majed Asad Stadium	Faisal Al-Husseini International Stadium	Dura International Stadium
Capacity: 9,000	Capacity: 12,500	Capacity: 18,000
		Dora International Stadium 01

== League table ==
Pos	Team	Pld	W	D	L	GF	GA	GD	Pts	Qualification or relegation
1	Shabab Al-Khalil (C)	22	16	6	0	41	9	+32	54	
2	Jabal Mukabar	22	16	3	3	53	24	+29	51	
3	Hilal Al-Quds	22	12	5	5	47	25	+22	41	
4	Shabab Al-Samu	22	12	4	6	46	33	+13	40	
5	Markaz Balata	22	10	4	8	32	26	+6	34	
6	Islami Qalqilyah	22	8	4	10	26	31	−5	28	
7	Shabab Al-Dhahiriya	22	8	3	11	28	44	−16	27	
8	Thaqafi Tulkarem	22	6	8	8	28	35	−7	26	
9	Al-Bireh Institute	22	4	7	11	24	35	−11	19	
10	Markaz Shabab Al-Am'ari	22	4	4	14	34	45	−11	16	
11	Tubas (R)	22	4	4	14	18	38	−20	16	Relegation to West Bank First League
12	Markaz Tulkarem (R)	22	4	4	14	20	52	−32	16	Relegation to West Bank First League

Updated to match(es) played on 19 April 2022. Source:
Rules for classification: 1) Points; 2) Goal difference; 3) Goals scored;
(C) Champions; (R) Relegated

== Season statistics ==
=== Top goalscorers ===
As of 19 April 2022

Rank	Player	Club	Goals
1	(Palestine) Shehab Qumbor	Jabal Mukabar	24
2	(Palestine) Rashid Adwi	Shabab Al-Dhahiriya	12
3	(Palestine) Tamer Seyam	Shabab Al-Khalil	11
3	(Palestine) Rami Masalma	Shabab Al-Samu	11
5	(Palestine) Hilal Mossa	Shabab Al-Khalil	10
5	(Palestine) Shaher Daoud	Islami Qalqilyah	10
7	(Palestine) Shaher Taweel	Shabab Al-Samu	9
8	(Palestine) Mahmoud Abu Warda	Hilal Al-Quds	8
9	(Palestine) Mohammad Nedal	Thaqafi Tulkarem	7
9	(Palestine) Mahmoud Al Iwisat	Hilal Al-Quds	7
9	(Palestine) Sameh Maraaba	Islami Qalqilyah	7

=== Discipline ===
==== Player ====
- Most yellow cards: 9
  - (Palestine) Oday Kharoub (Shabab Al-Khalil)
- Most red cards: 2
  - (Palestine) Oday Kharoub (Shabab Al-Khalil)
  - (Palestine) Yazan Iwaiwi (Shabab Al-Khalil)
  - (Palestine) Muhannad Abu Shariekh (Shabab Al-Dhahiriya)
  - (Palestine) Nadem Albarghothy (Al-Bireh Institute)
