= 2014–15 West Bank Premier League =

West Bank Premier League
- Season: 2014–15
- Champions: Shabab Al-Dhahiriya
- Relegated: Jabal Al-Mukaber; Shabab Yatta
- 2016 AFC Cup: Shabab Al-Dhahiriya; Ahli Al-Khaleel

The 2014–15 West Bank Premier League was the 12th season of the top-level football league in the West Bank, Palestine. It began on 13 September 2014 and ended on 5 May 2015. Taraji Wadi Al-Nes were the defending champions.

== League table ==
Pos	Team	Pld	W	D	L	GF	GA	GD	Pts	Qualification or relegation
1	Shabab Al-Dhahiriya (C)	22	14	6	2	32	10	+22	48	2016 AFC Cup group stage
2	Markaz Balata	22	14	5	3	57	26	+31	47	
3	Hilal Al-Quds	22	13	4	5	39	23	+16	43	
4	Thaqafi Tulkarm	22	12	4	6	30	21	+9	40	
5	Taraji Wadi Al-Nes	22	9	3	10	28	25	+3	30	
6	Shabab Al-Khadr	22	8	5	9	33	30	+3	29	
7	Ahli Al-Khalil	22	8	4	10	29	33	−4	28	2016 AFC Cup Qualifying play-off
8	Markaz Shabab Al-Am'ari	22	6	7	9	19	21	−2	25	
9	Shabab Dura	22	7	4	11	33	44	−11	25	
10	Shabab Al-Khalil	22	7	4	11	17	32	−15	25	
11	Jabal Al-Mukaber (R)	22	5	2	15	21	48	−27	17	Relegation to 2015–16 West Bank First League
12	Shabab Yatta (R)	22	2	6	14	21	46	−25	12	Relegation to 2015–16 West Bank First League

Updated to match(es) played on 5 May 2015. Source: Soccerway
Rules for classification: 1) points; 2) head-to-head points; 3) head-to-head goal difference; 4) head-to-head goals scored; 5) goal difference; 6) number of goals scored.
(C) Champions; (R) Relegated
