= 2023–24 Palestine Cup =

Palestine Cup
Tournament details
- Dates: 21 July 2023 –
- Teams: 28 (Gaza Strip)

Tournament statistics
- Matches played: 18
- Goals scored: 50 (2.78 per match)
- All statistics correct as of 31 July 2023.

The 2023–24 Palestine Cup is the top knockout tournament for association football clubs in the State of Palestine. The championship returns after an absence of three years. The tournament was supposed to take place in May, but it was postponed at the request of the clubs. The PFA decided to postpone it to July before the start of the new season in September. Shabab Rafah is the defending champion.

== Format ==
Due to the siege of Gaza and the geographical separation between the occupied Palestinian territories in 1967, the local championships are divided between the two regions. As for the Gaza Strip Cup, the tournament begins with the 32nd round, with the knockout system, until the final match. The draw for the Palestine Cup for Gaza Strip Ibrahim Abu Salim Championship clubs took place on 20 June 2023. It is scheduled to witness the participation of 28 clubs.

== Gaza Strip ==
=== Round of 32 ===
21 July 2023	Ittihad Khanyounis	Bye

21 July 2023	Al-Hilal	Bye

21 July 2023	Ittihad Beit Hanoun	Bye

21 July 2023	Al-Sadaqa	Bye

21 July 2023	Al-Aqsa	v	Gaza Sports

21 July 2023	Ittihad Al-Shujaiya	v	Al-Istiqlal

21 July 2023	Shabab Rafah	v	Al-Jalaa

21 July 2023	Khadamat Al-Shatea	v	Jamaei Rafah

21 July 2023	Shabab Jabalia	v	Ittihad Deir Al-Balah

21 July 2023	Beit Lahia	v	Khadamat Al-Bureij

21 July 2023	Beit Hanoun Al-Ahly	v	Shabab Khanyounis

21 July 2023	Khadamat Khanyounis	v	Khadamat Al-Nusseirat

21 July 2023	Shabab Zawaida	v	Ahli Gaza

21 July 2023	Ahli Al-Nusseirat	v	Al-Amal

21 July 2023	Khadamat Rafah	v	Namaa Sports

21 July 2023	Islamic Complex	v	Khadamat Jabalia

21 July 2023	Shabab Zawaida	v	Al-Ahli
