= 2018–19 Gaza Strip Premier League =

Gaza Strip Premier League
- Season: 2018–19
- Champions: Khidmat Rafah
- Relegated: Al-Ahli Beit Hanoun; Khidmat Khan Yunis
- Matches: 132
- Goals: 306 (2.32 per match)
- Biggest home win: Al-Ahli Beit Hanoun 6–0 Khidmat Khan Yunis (22 October 2018)
- Biggest away win: Al-Hilal Gaza 0–5 Al-Ittihad Shuja'iyya (14 October 2018)
- Highest scoring: Khidmat Rafah 5–2 Shabab Rafah (16 January 2019)

The 2018–19 Gaza Strip Premier League was the 2018–19 season of the Gaza Strip Premier League, the top football league in the Gaza Strip of Palestine. The season started on 8 September 2018 and ended on 10 March 2019.

== Teams ==
A total of 12 teams competed in the league. Shabab Khan Yunis were the defending champions. Al-Qadisiya and Al-Ahli Gaza were relegated from last season, and were replaced by promoted teams Al-Ahli Beit Hanoun and Khidmat Khan Yunis.

Location football club of Gaza Premier League
- Al-Ahli Beit Hanoun
- Al-Hilal Gaza
- Al-Ittihad Khan Yunis
- Al-Ittihad Shuja'iyya
- Al-Sadaqah
- Gaza Sports Club
- Khidmat Al-Shatia
- Khidmat Khan Yunis
- Khidmat Rafah
- Shabab Jabalia
- Shabab Khan Yunis
- Shabab Rafah

== League table ==
| Pos | Team | Pld | W | D | L | GF | GA | GD | Pts | Qualification or relegation |
|---|---|---|---|---|---|---|---|---|---|---|
| 1 | Khidmat Rafah (C) | 22 | 16 | 3 | 3 | 40 | 16 | +24 | 51 | |
| 2 | Shabab Jabalia | 22 | 10 | 6 | 6 | 26 | 20 | +6 | 36 | |
| 3 | Al-Ittihad Khan Yunis | 22 | 10 | 6 | 6 | 21 | 20 | +1 | 36 | |
| 4 | Shabab Khan Yunis | 22 | 10 | 5 | 7 | 29 | 21 | +8 | 35 | |
| 5 | Shabab Rafah | 22 | 9 | 7 | 6 | 30 | 27 | +3 | 34 | |
| 6 | Al-Ittihad Shuja'iyya | 22 | 9 | 4 | 9 | 35 | 25 | +10 | 31 | |
| 7 | Al-Hilal Gaza | 22 | 8 | 5 | 9 | 20 | 27 | −7 | 29 | |
| 8 | Khidmat Al-Shatia | 22 | 7 | 6 | 9 | 30 | 26 | +4 | 27 | |
| 9 | Al-Sadaqah | 22 | 6 | 8 | 8 | 16 | 19 | −3 | 26 | |
| 10 | Gaza Sports Club | 22 | 6 | 6 | 10 | 18 | 28 | −10 | 24 | |
| 11 | Al-Ahli Beit Hanoun (R) | 22 | 6 | 3 | 13 | 25 | 34 | −9 | 21 | Relegation to Gaza Strip First League |
| 12 | Khidmat Khan Yunis (R) | 22 | 3 | 5 | 14 | 16 | 43 | −27 | 14 | Relegation to Gaza Strip First League |

Source: Goalzz
(C) Champions; (R) Relegated

== See also ==
- 2018–19 West Bank Premier League
- 2018–19 Palestine Cup
