= 2017–18 West Bank Premier League =

Palestine - West Bank League
- Season: 2017–18

The 2017–18 West Bank Premier League was the 15th season of the top football league in the West Bank, Palestine.

== League table ==
Pos	Team	Pld	W	D	L	GF	GA	GD	Pts	Qualification or relegation
1	Hilal Al-Quds	22	14	6	2	45	11	+34	48	Qualification to 2019 AFC Cup play-off round
2	Ahli Al-Khaleel	22	12	9	1	51	20	+31	45	
3	Shabab Alsamu	22	10	6	6	39	32	+7	36	
4	Jabal Mukabar	22	11	3	8	34	31	+3	36	
5	Shabab Al-Khalil	22	9	7	6	23	21	+2	34	
6	Shabab Al-Bireh Institute	22	9	5	8	28	29	−1	32	
7	Markaz Balata	22	8	6	8	35	28	+7	30	
8	Taraji Wadi Al-Nes	22	8	5	9	34	34	0	29	
9	Thaqafi Tulkarm	22	5	12	5	26	25	+1	27	
10	Shabab Al-Dhahiriya SC	22	7	5	10	31	35	−4	26	
11	Shabab Al-Khadr	22	2	3	17	18	50	−32	9	Relegation to West Bank First League
12	Duwwara	22	2	3	17	18	66	−48	9	Relegation to West Bank First League

Source: FIFA
Rules for classification: 1) Points; 2) Goal difference; 3) Number of goals scored;

== See also ==
- 2017–18 Gaza Strip Premier League
- 2017–18 Palestine Cup
