= 2017–18 Gaza Strip Premier League =

Palestine - Gaza Strip League
- Season: 2017–18

The 2017–18 Gaza Strip Premier League is the 2017–18 season of the top football league in the Gaza Strip of Palestine.

== Standings ==
Pos	Team	Pld	W	D	L	GF	GA	GD	Pts	Relegation
1	Shabab Khan Younes	22	13	6	3	36	21	+15	45	
2	Khadamat Rafah	22	11	7	4	26	12	+14	40	
3	Al-Sadaqa	22	11	6	5	33	17	+16	39	
4	Al-Ittihad Shejaia	22	9	6	7	35	25	+10	33	
5	Shabab Jabalia	22	9	6	7	24	27	−3	33	
6	Shabab Rafah	22	8	7	7	29	27	+2	31	
7	Gaza Sports Club	22	9	3	10	27	25	+2	30	
8	Khadamat Al-Shatea	22	6	7	9	25	34	−9	25	
9	Al-Ittihad Khan Younes	22	6	7	9	19	29	−10	25	
10	Al-Hilal Gaza	22	6	5	11	20	29	−9	23	
11	Al-Qadisiya	22	3	9	10	22	33	−11	18	Relegation to the Gaza Strip First League
12	Al-Ahli Gaza	22	3	7	12	28	45	−17	16	Relegation to the Gaza Strip First League

Source: Goalzz
Rules for classification: 1) points; 2) goal difference; 3) number of goals scored.

== See also ==
- 2017–18 West Bank Premier League
- 2017–18 Palestine Cup
