= 2019–20 West Bank First League =

West Bank First League
- Season: 2019–20

The 2019–20 West Bank First League is the 34th season of the West Bank First League, the second tier football league in the West Bank of Palestine. The season started on 20 September 2020.

== League table ==
Pos	Team	Pld	W	D	L	GF	GA	GD	Pts	Qualification or relegation
1	Shabab Al-Dhahiriya (C)	22	14	6	2	44	18	+26	48	Promotion to 2020–21 West Bank Premier League
2	Tubas	22	13	4	5	43	18	+25	43	Promotion to 2020–21 West Bank Premier League
3	Al-Karmil	22	11	6	5	40	20	+20	39	
4	Silwan	22	11	4	7	29	25	+4	37	
5	Markaz Askar	22	9	5	8	32	31	+1	32	
6	Shabab Al-Obaideya	22	8	6	8	32	26	+6	30	
7	Islami Kalkelea	22	9	3	10	37	39	−2	30	
8	Al-Arabi Beit Safafa	22	8	6	8	27	31	−4	30	
9	Markaz Tulkarem	22	8	4	10	30	35	−5	28	
10	Jenin	22	6	5	11	31	40	−9	23	
11	Abna Al Quds	22	6	4	12	32	35	−3	22	
12	Isawiya	22	1	3	18	18	77	−59	6	

Source: Soccerway
Rules for classification: 1) Points; 2) Goal difference; 3) Goals scored;
(C) Champions

== See also ==
- 2019–20 West Bank Premier League
- 2019–20 Palestine Cup
