= Yatta International Stadium =

Football stadium in Yatta, Hebron Governorate, West Bank, Palestine

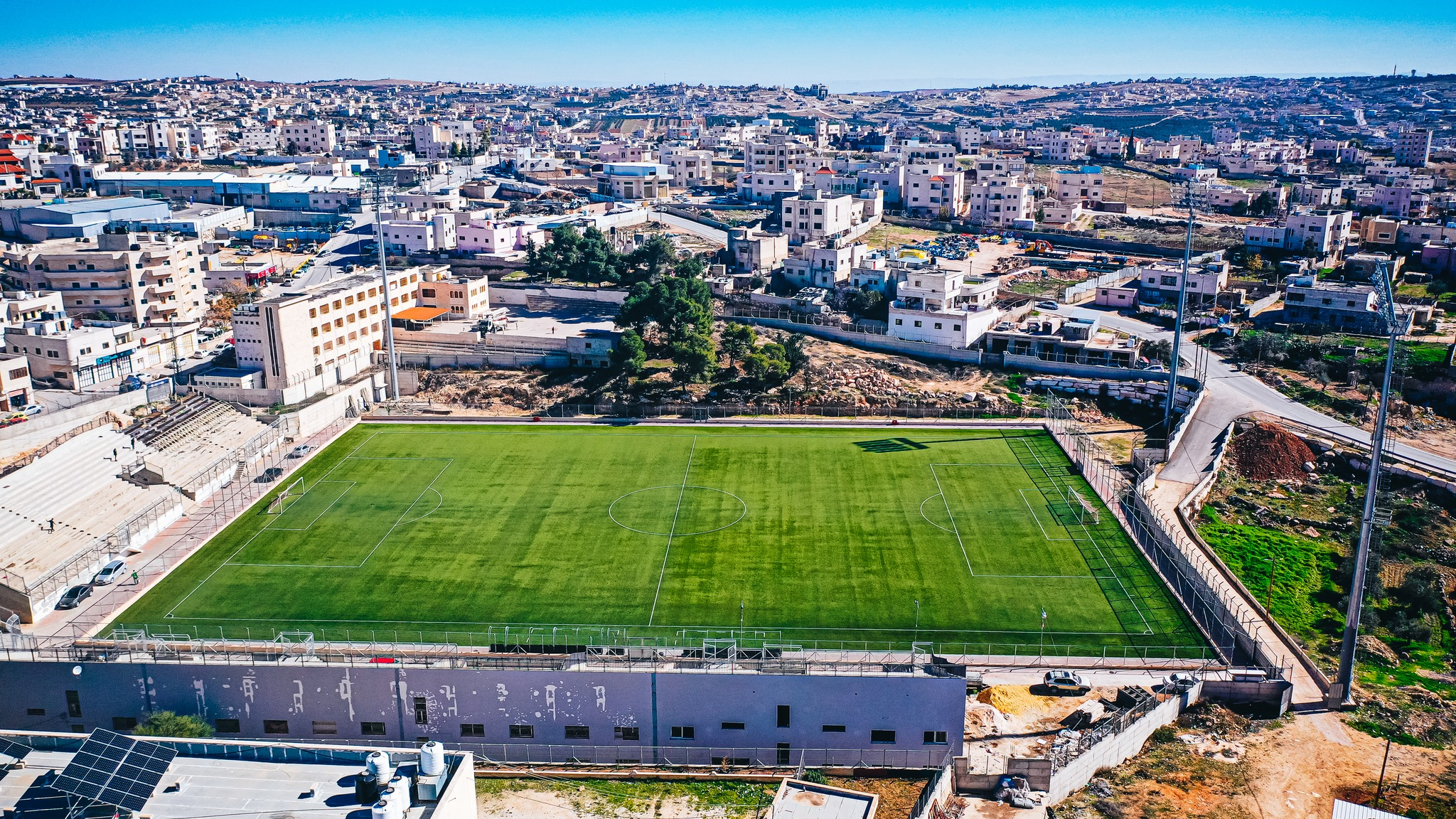
- Interactive map of Yatta International Stadium
- Full name: Yatta International Stadium, Shahid Wafa Stadium
- Address: Yatta, Hebron; Palestine
- Location: Yatta, West Bank
- Coordinates: 31.4486°N 35.1019°E
- Capacity: 20,000

Construction
- Opened: 1990
- Renovated: 2015

Tenants
- Shabab Yatta; Palestine national football team

Yatta International Stadium, or Shahid Wafa Stadium, (Arabic: ملعب يطا الدولي) is a football stadium in Yatta, Hebron Governorate, West Bank, Palestine. The stadium is considered the most important and largest sports stadium in the city of Yatta, and it is the official stadium in which Shabab Yatta club plays. The stadium was established in 1990 and has witnessed several stages of development. Although it has international specifications and standards, it is not accredited by the Palestinian Football Association to host matches.

== History ==
Yatta International Stadium was established in 1990, and since then it has witnessed several stages of development. During recent years, the municipality of Yatta and its municipal council have shown great interest in developing and improving this stadium to become a modern sports center that meets international standards.

== Specifications and Standards ==
Yatta International Stadium is distinguished by international specifications, as it is 120 meters long, 85 meters wide, and has an area of 8,500 square meters, and can accommodate about twenty thousand crowds. This stadium will be the third football stadium in Palestine that has been approved with international specifications to host official matches and local and international leagues. The stadium features a turf field that cost more than a million dollars and was equipped with a lighting system costing half a million dollars. Although it has international standards, it has not been approved by the Palestinian Football Association to host international matches.

== Development ==
Beautification and improvement work is underway for Wafa Stadium, as part of the infrastructure and community planning program funded by the United States Agency for International Development (USAID) in cooperation with CHF International. These works include improving lighting and decorating the stadium to make it a distinctive and modern place for sporting events. Financial support was provided to realize this project, as the Ministry of Finance donated $578,000 to rehabilitate the terraces. Work continued to improve the stadium and provide the necessary equipment, including the lighting system and television broadcasting facilities.

== See also ==
- Shabab Yatta
