= 2018–19 Palestine Cup =

Tournament details
- Country: Palestine

The 2018–19 Palestine Cup is the 2018–19 season of the top football cup in Palestine.

There are two competitions, the Gaza Strip Cup for clubs in the Gaza Strip, and the West Bank Cup for clubs in the West Bank. A two-legged Palestine Cup final is played between the cup winners of the Gaza Strip and the West Bank.

== Gaza Strip Cup ==
=== Preliminary round ===
Team 1	Score	Team 2
17 Dec 2018
Al Aqsa	8 : 0	Al Shafae
Al Salah Islamic Association	2 : 3	Jamaee Rafah
Al Mashtal	0 : 3	Ittihad Dear Balah
Al Salam	0 : 1	Al Wefaq
18 Dec 2018
Namaa	3 : 1	Shabab Al Zawaida
Mojama Islami	0 : 1	Al Amal
Ahli Al Nosirat	2 : 0	Al Esteqlal
Al Redwan	2 : 2 (5 : 6 p)	Al Zaytoon

=== Round of 32 ===
Team 1	Score	Team 2
23 Mar 2019
Khadamat Rafah	0 : 0 (6 : 5 p)	Beit Hanoun
Ittihad Shojaeyya	3 : 2	Khdamat Dear Balah
Ittihad Khanyounis	0 : 1	Ahli Gaza
Beat Lahia	2 : 0	Shabab Al Zaytoon
24 Mar 2019
Khadamat Al Shatea	2 : 2 (4 : 3 p)	Al Jala
Khadamat Al Nosirat	2 : 3	Jamaee Rafah
Al Sadaka Club	6 : 2	Khadamat Al Burij
Shabab Jabalia	2 : 1	Namaa
25 Mar 2019
Shabab Rafah	2 : 0	Khadamat Al Maghazi
Gaza Sporting Club	1 : 0	Ittihad Dear Balah
Al Qadesia	3 : 2	Ahli Al Nosirat
Shabab Khanyounis	3 : 0	Al Tofah
26 Mar 2019
Khadamat Khanyounis	4 : 0	Al Amal
Ahli Beit Hanoun	3 : 3 (4 : 3 p)	Al Zaytoon
Hilal Gaza	0 : 1	Al Aqsa
Al Ataa	2 : 1	Al Wefaq

=== Round of 16 ===
Team 1	Score	Team 2
1 Apr 2019
Ittihad Shojaeyya	3 : 1	Al Qadesia
Shabab Rafah	1 : 0	Beat Lahia
Al Sadaka Club	8 : 1	Jamaee Rafah
Shabab Jabalia	1 : 4	Ahli Gaza
2 Apr 2019
Khadamat Rafah	3 : 0	Khadamat Khanyounis
Ahli Beit Hanoun	0 : 1	Gaza Sporting Club
Khadamat Al Shatea	3 : 0	Al Ataa
Shabab Khanyounis	2 : 1	Al Aqsa

=== Quarter-finals ===
Team 1	Score	Team 2
8 Apr 2019
Ahli Gaza	0 : 2	Ittihad Shojaeyya
9 Apr 2019
Gaza Sporting Club	1 : 2	Al Sadaka Club
Khadamat Al Shatea	1 : 0	Shabab Khanyounis
11 Apr 2019
Shabab Rafah	0 : 0 (4 : 5 p)	Khadamat Rafah

=== Semi-finals ===
Team 1	Score	Team 2
16 Apr 2019
Khadamat Rafah	0 : 0 (4 : 2 p)	Khadamat Al Shatea
Ittihad Shojaeyya	1 : 0	Al Sadaka Club

=== Final ===
Team 1	Score	Team 2
22 Apr 2019
Khadamat Rafah	0 : 0 (4 : 3 p)	Ittihad Shojaeyya

== West Bank Cup ==
=== Preliminary round 1 ===
Team 1	Score	Team 2
14 Dec 2018
Alkarmel	1 : 5	Ahli Sour Baher
Alshoban Almuslimin	0 : 0 (5 : 4 p)	Shabab Yatta
Shabab Beit Fajjar	3 : 1	Joret Alshama
15 Dec 2018
Beit Awwa	1 : 7	Beit Ommar
21 Dec 2018
Osrin	1 : 3	Tammon
Markez Raqam Wahad	2 : 2 (5 : 4 p)	Markez Nour Shams
24 Dec 2018
Jabal Alzayton	3 : 1	Al Sawahreh
25 Dec 2018
Al Mouwathfen - Burj Alluqluq	0 : 1	Silwan
28 Dec 2018
Al Sawahreh	1 : 1 (3 : 2 p)	Al Mouwathfen - Burj Alluqluq

=== Preliminary round 2 ===
Team 1	Score	Team 2
18 Dec 2018
Shabab Beit Fajjar	1 : 2	Alshoban Almuslimin
Beit Ommar	5 : 3	Ahli Sour Baher
21 Dec 2018
Shabab Beit Fajjar	0 : 3	Ahli Sour Baher
1 Jan 2019
Shabab Abu Dies	0 : 3	Al Sawahreh

=== Round of 32 ===
Team 1	Score	Team 2
3 Feb 2019
Shabab Alamari	1 : 0	Tammon
Markez Tulkarm	2 : 2 (4 : 3 p)	Markez Raqam Wahad
Jabal Mukaber	4 : 1	Al Sawahreh
4 Feb 2019
Alshoban Almuslimin	2 : 4	Shabab Al Ubeidiya
Taraji Wad Alness	1 : 0	Alarabi Beit Safafa
Shabab Al Dharia	1 : 0	Ahli Qalqilya
Ahli Sour Baher	0 : 2	Islami Qalqilya
5 Feb 2019
Mosaset Al Bireh	5 : 0	Beit Ommar
11 Feb 2019
Markez Balata	1 : 0	Abna Alquds
Shabab Alkhader	0 : 1	Thaqafi Tulkarm
Tubas	1 : 3	Silwan
12 Feb 2019
Shabab Alsamu	2 : 2 (3 : 4 p)	Isawiya
Ahli Al Khalil	4 : 0	Hilal Areeha
Al Quwwat Al Falistinia	1 : 2	Jabal Alzayton
Shabab Al Khalil	3 : 2	Shabab Dora
20 Feb 2019
Hilal Alquds	5 : 2	Jenin

=== Round of 16 ===
Team 1	Score	Team 2
8 Mar 2019
Shabab Al Dharia	1 : 1 (5 : 6 p)	Isawiya
Taraji Wad Alness	1 : 1 (4 : 2 p)	Shabab Al Khalil
Thaqafi Tulkarm	0 : 0 (12 : 11 p)	Shabab Al Ubeidiya
Markez Balata	2 : 0	Mosaset Al Bireh
9 Mar 2019
Ahli Al Khalil	4 : 1	Silwan
Shabab Alamari	3 : 1	Markez Tulkarm
Jabal Alzayton	0 : 2	Jabal Mukaber
18 May 2019
Hilal Alquds	3 : 0	Islami Qalqilya

=== Quarter-finals ===
Team 1	Score	Team 2
17 May 2019
Jabal Mukaber	0 : 1	Markez Balata
Thaqafi Tulkarm	2 : 3	Shabab Alamari
Isawiya	1 : 1 (6 : 5 p)	Taraji Wad Alness
22 May 2019
Ahli Al Khalil	0 : 1	Hilal Alquds

=== Semi-finals ===
Team 1	Score	Team 2
25 May 2019
Shabab Alamari	2 : 1	Isawiya
26 May 2019
Markez Balata	1 : 0	Hilal Alquds

=== Final ===
Team 1	Score	Team 2
1 Jun 2019
Shabab Alamari	1 : 2	Markez Balata

== Palestine Cup Final ==
30 June 2019
19:30 UTC+03:00

Khadamat Rafah	1–1	Markez Balata
Moataz Alnahal 72' (pen.)	Report	Salem 32'

Rafah Municipal Stadium, Rafah, Gaza Strip
Referee: Fayez Omran

Markez Balata	v	Khadamat Rafah

Nablus Football Stadium, Nablus, West Bank

The second leg was originally to be played on 3 July 2019. However, the match was postponed after Israel denied permits for all but 4 of Khadamat Rafah's players to travel to the West Bank, reportedly due to security concerns. In September 2019, the game was cancelled entirely after the decision by the Coordinator of Government Activities in the Territories (COGAT) was upheld by a court.

== See also ==
- 2018–19 West Bank Premier League
- 2018–19 Gaza Strip Premier League
