= Silwan Sport Club =

Palestinian football club

Silwan Sport Club (Arabic: نادي سلوان الرياضي), also known as Silwan Al-Maqdisi Club or Silwan FC, is a Palestinian sports and cultural club based in the Silwan Neighbourhood of East Jerusalem. The club competes in the West Bank Premier League, the last season in this league was 2022–2023. Beyond just football, this club operates as a community instituition, where cultural, educational and social programmes are run for the residents of the Silwan Area.

== History ==
Silwan Sport Club is based in the Silwan neighbourhood of East Jerusalem, A predominantly Palestinian district in the southeastern outskirts of the (current) Old City. The Mughrabi Gate Square in the Wadi Hilweh part of Silwan historically has served as the club's primary training ground, where local youth used the place for practicing sport at night. The club was temporarily closed during the First Intifada (1987–1993), after which it was reconstituted as a registered association.

The club celebrated its 60th anniversary in 2025, placing its founding in the mid-1960s.

== Football ==
=== League history ===
Silwan Sport Club competes within the Palestinian football pyramid administered by the Palestinian Football Association. In 1977, Silwan won the West Bank League title, finishing ahead of Al-Arabi Beit Safafa, YMCA, Al-Bireh Group and Shabab Khaleel in a five time competition.

The club reached the final of the West Bank Cup in 1987, where they were defeated by Thaqafi Tulkarm with a score of 2–1. Also, Silwan FC has won the Winter Jericho Championship in 2004/2005 and 2014.

In the 2023–24 season, Al-Sawahreh defeated Silwan 5–0 in a promotion playoff, making an end to the club's attempt to return to the top of Palestinian football. In the West Bank first division, the club's recent standings shows Silwan sitting at position 11 with 25 points, having secured 5 wins, 10 draws and 7 losses. They scored 22 goals and condeded 28.

=== Honours ===
Competition	Result	Year
West Bank League	Winner	1977
West Bank Cup	Runner-up	1987
Winter Jericho Championship	Winner	2004/2005, 2014
West Bank League - Second Level	Winner	2014/2015

== Community and cultural role ==
Silwan Sport Club describes itself as a Palestinian non-governmental, non-profit organization, independent of any political party, aiming to enhance the development of Palestinian youth in the Silwan region. The club has received funding through EU-backed projects and also has had partnerships with local civil society organisations. It has stated they it receives no financial support from the Palestinian Authority.

== Political context and Israeli restrictions ==
As a Palestinian institution in East Jerusalem (, a territory that has been occupied by Israel since the 1967 Six-Day War) Silwan Sport Club has faced repeated interventions by Israeli authorities.

=== Israeli military entry ===
In November 2018, the Asian Football Confederation (AFC) Publicly expressed their concern after receiving reports from the Palestine Football Association that Israeli military personnel had entered the club's headquarters in East Jerusalem. The Palestinian Governor of Jerusalem and the club's manager were reportedly detained during thisintervention. The club was forced to closed as a consequence. The AFC stated that the sovereignty of the PFA must be recognised and must be defended, expressing their support for the Palestinian Football Association

=== Ban on student celebration ===
In August 2023, Israeli National Security Minister Itamar Ben-Gvir banned a planned celebration at Silwan Club. Prizes were going to be distributed to students who passed their general eams, this event has been held annually in occupied Jerusalem. Israeli Forces summoned and interrogated club president Ahmad Ghoul for hours, threatening him with him extreme punishment if he doesn't cancel the event.

=== Ban on 60th anniversary celebration and arrest of president ===
In October 2025, Israeli authorities that were acting on an order signed by Ben Gvir, banned the club's 60th anniversary celebration. The ban that was posted on the door of the club's headquarters statement was as follows: "There is an intention to hold a conference sponsored by the Palestinian Authority without a written permit". This invokes the Law implementing the Central Agreement on the West Bank and Gaza Strip limiting activities from 1994. Ahmed Al-Ghoul, the club's president was arrested in his home in connection with this ban. He was released that very same evening on the condition that the anniversary would be banned across Jerusalem and the club be closed for three days.

The club's media committee has so far rejected all accusations of Palestinian Authority funding, stating that all activities are financed through EU projects and civil society partnerships. This committee has described the incident as a part of a broader pattern of Israel targeting Jerusalemite sports and cultural institutions.
