= 2016–17 Palestine Cup =

Tournament details
- Country: Palestine

Final positions
- Champions: Shabab Rafah
- Runners-up: Ahli Al-Khaleel

The 2016–17 Palestine Cup is the 2016–17 season of the top football cup in Palestine.

There are two competitions, the Gaza Strip Cup for clubs in the Gaza Strip, and the West Bank Cup for clubs in the West Bank. A two-legged Palestine Cup final is played between the cup winners of the Gaza Strip and the West Bank.

== Gaza Strip Cup ==
=== Preliminary round 1 ===
Team 1	Score	Team 2
16 Dec 2016
Hiteen	0 : 1	Al Awda
Al Aqsa	2 : 0	Ahli Al Burij
Al Ataa	2 : 1	Shabab AL Maghazi
Khdamat Dear Balah	1 : 2	AL Shawka
Jamaee Rafah	2 : 1	Al Wefaq
Mojama Islami	5 : 1	Al Zaytoon
17 Dec 2016
Ittihad Dear Balah	2 : 3	Shabab Al Zawaida
Al Redwan	2 : 1	AL Yarmouk
Shabab Maan	0 : 2	Al Tarabot
18 Dec 2016
Namaa	4 : 2	Al Shafae
Beit Hanoun	4 : 1	Al Amal
Al Jazeera	2 : 1	Palestine

=== Preliminary round 2 ===
Team 1	Score	Team 2
23 Dec 2016
Al Tarabot	0 : 4	Al Mashtal
Al Ataa	1 : 1 (2 : 4 p)	Ittihad Jabalia
Shabab Al Zawaida	1 : 0	Namaa
24 Dec 2016
Al Awda	1 : 1 (5 : 4 p)	Al Aqsa
Al Redwan	2 : 1	Al Jazeera
AL Shawka	0 : 2	Ahli Al Nosirat
25 Dec 2016
Beit Hanoun	1 : 0	Al Masdar
Jamaee Rafah	1 : 1 (6 : 7 p)	Mojama Islami

=== Round of 32 ===
Team 1	Score	Team 2
14 Apr 2017
Shabab Khanyounis	2 : 1	Mojama Islami
Khadamat Rafah	1 : 1 (4 : 3 p)	Khadamat Al Nosirat
Khadamat Al Burij	2 : 1	Shabab Al Zawaida
Shabab Rafah	3 : 0	Khadamat Al Maghazi
Al Sadaka Club	4 : 0	Al Esteqlal
15 Apr 2017
Gaza Sporting Club	0 : 0 (3 : 1 p)	Beit Hanoun
Al Jala	4 : 0	Al Redwan
Ittihad Shojaeyya	1 : 0	Al Qadesia
Ittihad Khanyounis	3 : 1	Al Mashtal
Ahli Gaza	0 : 0 (3 : 1 p)	Al Zaytoon
Al Tofah	1 : 0	Khadamat Jabalia
16 Apr 2017
Khadamat Khanyounis	3 : 1	Al Salah Islamic Association
Khadamat Al Shatea	0 : 0 (2 : 4 p)	Shabab Jabalia
Beat Lahia	0 : 1	Al Awda
Ahli Beit Hanoun	3 : 0	Ahli Al Nosirat
Hilal Gaza	4 : 1	Ittihad Jabalia

=== Round of 16 ===
Team 1	Score	Team 2
21 Apr 2017
Shabab Khanyounis	0 : 0 (4 : 3 p)	Khadamat Khanyounis
Gaza Sporting Club	0 : 1	Al Tofah
22 Apr 2017
Shabab Rafah	1 : 0	Hilal Gaza
Ittihad Shojaeyya	0 : 1	Ittihad Khanyounis
Al Sadaka Club	0 : 0 (3 : 1 p)	Ahli Beit Hanoun
23 Apr 2017
Khadamat Rafah	2 : 0	Al Jala
Shabab Jabalia	3 : 2	Al Awda
Ahli Gaza	2 : 2 (5 : 3 p)	Khadamat Al Burij

=== Quarter-finals ===
Team 1	Score	Team 2
28 Apr 2017
Ittihad Khanyounis	1 : 1 (3 : 5 p)	Ahli Gaza
Shabab Rafah	3 : 1	Al Sadaka Club
29 Apr 2017
Shabab Khanyounis	2 : 1	Shabab Jabalia
Al Tofah	1 : 3	Khadamat Rafah

=== Semi-finals ===
Team 1	Score	Team 2
5 May 2017
Shabab Rafah	1 : 0	Ahli Gaza
6 May 2017
Shabab Khanyounis	0 : 1	Khadamat Rafah

=== Final ===
Team 1	Score	Team 2
12 May 2017
Shabab Rafah	2 : 0	Khadamat Rafah

== West Bank Cup ==
=== Preliminary round 1 ===
Team 1	Score	Team 2
13 Dec 2016
Jabal Alzayton	2 : 2 (9:11 p)	Almazra Alsharqiya
16 Dec 2016
Shabab Abu Dies	2 : 2 (1 : 3 p)	Abu Falah
18 Dec 2016
Ahli Qalqilya	2 : 2 (7 : 5 p)	Shabab Nablus
19 Dec 2016
Tammon	0 : 3 (awd.)	Ittihad Nablus
Nuba	3 : 7	Beit Ommar
Joret Alshama	1 : 2	Wad Fukin
20 Dec 2016
Marah Mella	0 : 0 (2 : 4 p)	Alkarmel
Islami Sour Baher	2 : 2 (2 : 4 p)	Om Toba

=== Preliminary round 2 ===
Team 1	Score	Team 2
20 Dec 2016
Abu Falah	0 : 2	Isawiya
Almazra Alsharqiya	0 : 3	Al Mouwathfen - Burj Alluqluq
21 Dec 2016
Attil	0 : 4	Islami Qalqilya
Markez Raqam Wahad	1 : 0	Osrin
23 Dec 2016
Ittihad Nablus	0 : 3	Markez Nour Shams
Ahli Qalqilya	0 : 0 (5 : 4 p)	Markez Jenin
Dar Salah	2 : 5	Alkarmel
Om Toba	3 : 7	Beit Ommar
28 Dec 2016
Ahli Qalqilya	0 : 0 (3 : 5 p)	Islami Qalqilya
31 Dec 2016
Markez Raqam Wahad	0 : 0 (5 : 4 p)	Markez Nour Shams
6 Jan 2017
Ahli Qalqilya	2 : 1	Markez Nour Shams

=== Round of 32 ===
Team 1	Score	Team 2
16 Feb 2017
Ahli Al Khalil	3 : 0	Alarabi Beit Safafa
Markez Balata	4 : 1	Islami Qalqilya
Shabab Al Dharia	5 : 1	Ahli Qalqilya
Shabab Al Khalil	3 : 0 (awd.)	Al Mouwathfen - Burj Alluqluq
Markez Tulkarm	5 : 0	Wad Fukin
Thaqafi Tulkarm	2 : 1	Silwan
17 Feb 2017
Shabab Alkhader	2 : 0	Markez Raqam Wahad
Taraji Wad Alness	2 : 0	Shabab Alobaideya
Hilal Alquds	1 : 1 (6 : 7 p)	Alshoban Almuslimin
Shabab Alamari	5 : 1	Beit Ommar
Jabal Mukaber	0 : 1	Abna Alquds
18 Feb 2017
Shabab Alsamu	2 : 0	Isawiya
Mosaset Al Bireh	0 : 2	Markez Askar
Shabab Dora	1 : 0	Alkarmel
19 Feb 2017
Shabab Yatta	0 : 1	Tubas
Palestinian Forces	3 : 2	Jenin

=== Round of 16 ===
Team 1	Score	Team 2
24 Mar 2017
Taraji Wad Alness	2 : 1	Markez Tulkarm
Tubas	0 : 1	Shabab Alsamu
25 Mar 2017
Alshoban Almuslimin	0 : 0 (4 : 2 p)	Shabab Alamari
Shabab Alkhader	0 : 0 (1 : 4 p)	Abna Alquds
11 Apr 2017
Palestinian Forces	0 : 0 (5 : 4 p)	Shabab Al Dharia
Thaqafi Tulkarm	3 : 0	Shabab Dora
12 Apr 2017
Shabab Al Khalil	1 : 1 (4 : 1 p)	Markez Balata
Markez Askar	0 : 3 (awd.)	Ahli Al Khalil

=== Quarter-finals ===
Team 1	Score	Team 2
28 May 2017
Alshoban Almuslimin	0 : 4	Taraji Wad Alness
Abna Alquds	2 : 4	Ahli Al Khalil
29 May 2017
Thaqafi Tulkarm	2 : 3	Shabab Alsamu
Palestinian Forces	0 : 3	Shabab Al Khalil

=== Semi-finals ===
Team 1	Score	Team 2
31 May 2017
Taraji Wad Alness	1 : 2	Ahli Al Khalil
1 Jun 2017
Shabab Alsamu	0 : 1	Shabab Al Khalil

=== Final ===
Team 1	Score	Team 2
17 Jun 2017
Ahli Al Khalil	0 : 0 (3 : 1 p)	Shabab Al Khalil

== Palestine Cup Final ==
1 August 2017
17:00 UTC+3

Shabab Rafah	2–0	Ahli Al-Khaleel
Said Alsbakhi 61' (pen.); Mohammad Abu Dan 86'

Yarmouk Stadium, Gaza City
4 August 2017
18:00 UTC+3

Ahli Al-Khaleel	0–0	Shabab Rafah

Dora International Stadium, Hebron

== See also ==
- 2016–17 West Bank Premier League
- 2016–17 Gaza Strip Premier League
