= Gaza Strip Super Cup =

Palestinian football competition

The Gaza Strip Super Cup is the football super cup competition in the Gaza Strip of Palestine, played between the winners of the Gaza Strip Premier League and the Gaza Strip Cup.

== Results ==
Year	Winners	Score	Runners-up	Ref.
2000	Al-Ittihad Shuja'iyya	2–1	Khadamat Rafah	
2013	Shabab Rafah	1–0	Sadaqa	
2014	Shabab Rafah	1–0	Khadamat Rafah	
2015	Al-Ittihad Shuja'iyya	3–0	Shabab Khan Younis	
2016	Khadamat Rafah	3–1	Shabab Khan Younis	
2017	Shabab Rafah	1-1 (6–5 pen.)	Sadaqa	
2018	Shabab Rafah	0–0 (5–3 pen.)	Shabab Khan Younis	
2019	Al-Ittihad Shuja'iyya	1–1 (4–3 pen.)	Khadamat Rafah	
2020	Shabab Rafah	0–0 (4–3 pen.)	Khadamat Rafah	

== See also ==
- Palestine Cup
- West Bank Super Cup
