= Hussein Bin Ali Stadium =

Stadium in Hebron, West Bank, Palestine

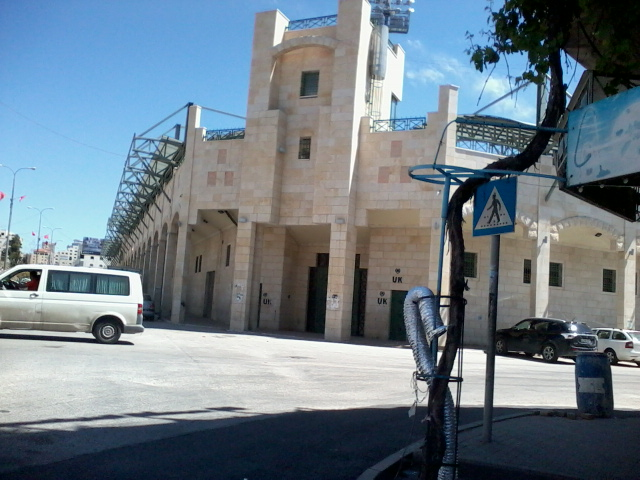
- Interactive map of Hussein Bin Ali Stadium
- Location: Hebron, West Bank, Palestine
- Coordinates: 31°32′14″N 35°05′57″E
- Capacity: 8,000
- Surface: Artificial turf
- Record attendance: 11,000

Construction
- Opened: 1940
- Renovated: 2009

Tenants
- Ahli Al-Khaleel, Shabab Al-Khalil SC, Shabab Alsamu

Hussein Bin Ali Stadium is an association football stadium in Hebron, West Bank, Palestine.

== West Bank Premier League ==
The stadium is home to Ahli Al-Khaleel, Shabab Al-Khalil SC and Shabab Alsamu in the West Bank Premier League. Playing for Shabab, Palestine national football team player Ashraf Nu'man scored two goals at the venue against Thaqafi Tulkarem in the 2016–17 season.

== Palestine Cup ==
The 2015 Palestine Cup final between Ahli Al-Khaleel and Ittihad Shujaiyah took place at the stadium - the first final to be contested by the top teams from the West Bank Premier League and Gaza Strip League in 15 years. The intervention of FIFA, UEFA and the AFC was necessary to secure permission from Israeli authorities for players to travel from the Gaza Strip to the West Bank. The match was attended by President of the Palestinian Football Association Jibril Rajoub, MK Ahmad Tibi and the mayors of Bethlehem and Hebron, and sponsored by the Bank of Palestine.

The stadium was again the venue for the 2016 cup final, won by Ahli Al-Khaleel against Shabab Khan Yunis.
