= West Bank Super Cup =

- Organiser(s): Palestinian Football Federation (PFF)
- Region: West Bank
- Teams: 2
- Current champions: Hilal Al-Quds (4th title)
- Most championships: Hilal Al-Quds (4 titles)
- 2018

The West Bank Super Cup is the football super cup competition in the West Bank of Palestine, played between the winners of the West Bank Premier League and the West Bank Cup.

== Results ==
Key to list of winners
*	Match went to extra time
†	Match decided by a penalty shoot-out after extra time

West Bank Super Cup Winners
Season	Winners	Score	Runners–up
2010	Taraji Wadi Al-Nes	1–1 †	Jabal Al-Mukaber
2011	Hilal Al-Quds	4–0	Markaz Shabab Al-Am'ari
2012	Shabab Al-Dhahiriya	2–1	Hilal Al-Quds
2013	Shabab Al-Khalil	1–1 †	Shabab Al-Dhahiriya
2014	Hilal Al-Quds	3–0	Taraji Wadi Al-Nes
2015	Ahli Al-Khaleel	3–2	Shabab Al-Dhahiriya
2016	Ahli Al-Khaleel	2–0	Shabab Al-Khalil
2017	Hilal Al-Quds	2–1	Ahli Al-Khaleel
2018	Hilal Al-Quds	2–1	Thaqafi Tulkarem

== See also ==
- Palestine Cup
- Gaza Strip Super Cup
