= Sayed Gharib =

Sayyid Gharib السيد غريب
- village
- Location within Iraq
- Coordinates: 33°55′N 44°10′E
- Country: Iraq
- Governorate: Saladin
- District: Dujail

Sayed Gharib (Arabic: السيد غريب), also transliterated as Sayyid Gharib or Syed Ghraib, is a village in the Dujail district of Saladin Governorate, Iraq. The village lies beside Highway 1 a few kilometres south of the city of Balad and 120 kilometres southeast of the provincial capital, Tikrit. The national capital, Baghdad, is another 80 kilometres south.

== Insurgency ==
In October 2009 four gunmen kidnapped five farmers in the area.

In June 2010 two Sahwa militiamen were killed and another was seriously injured by an explosive at a checkpoint in the area.

In July 2013 a policeman was reportedly shot by unidentified gunmen at a checkpoint.

On 3 January 2015, IraqiNews, citing an anonymous security source, reported that Iraqi security forces had liberated the village from Islamic State of Iraq and the Levant (ISIL/ISIS) militants. The source advised IraqiNews that "The security forces have managed to liberate the whole area of Sayed-Gharib, located 120 km south of Tikrit in the district of al-Dajil," adding that, "The clashes between the security forces and ISIS militants have resulted in the deaths of 7 ISIS snipers positioned inside some abandoned houses in the area."
