= Ahmed Nakhla =

Egyptian footballer (born 1971)

Personal information
- Full name: Ahmed El-Nouemany
- Date of birth: 5 February 1971 (age 55)
- Place of birth: Cairo, Egypt
- Height: 1.76 m (5 ft 9 in)
- Position: Defender

Senior career*
Years	Team	Apps	(Gls)
1991–1996	Al Mokawloon Al Arab SC		
1996–1998	Al-Ahly		
1998–1999	Al-Masry		
1999–2003	Baladeyet El-Mahalla		
2004–2005	Tanta FC		

International career
1994–1996	Egypt	8	(0)
- * Club domestic league appearances and goals

Ahmed El Nouemany (Arabic: أحمد نخلة, born 5 February 1971), commonly known as Nakhla, is a former footballer of the Egypt national football team.

== Club career ==
Nakhla spent his professional career in the Egyptian Premier League with Arab Contractors SC, Al-Ahly, Al-Masry, Baladeyet El-Mahalla and Tanta FC.

== International career ==
Nakhla was a member in Egypt team in 1992 Summer Olympics.
