= Mohamed Surour =

Emirati footballer (born 1993)

Personal information
- Full name: Mohamed Surour Masoud Al-Yassi
- Date of birth: 31 October 1993 (age 33)
- Place of birth: United Arab Emirates
- Height: 1.70 m (5 ft 7 in)
- Position: Midfielder

Youth career
- Al-Sharjah

Senior career*
Years	Team	Apps	(Gls)
2011–2017	Al-Sharjah	35	(0)
2017–2022	Al-Wasl	14	(0)
2022–2023	Masfout	3	(0)
- * Club domestic league appearances and goals

Mohamed Surour (Arabic:محمد سرور; born 31 October 1993) is an Emirati footballer who plays as a midfielder.
