= 1977 West Bank Premier League =

Palestine Premier League
- Season: 1977
- Champions: Silwan

1977 West Bank Premier League was the first season of the West Bank Premier League and the 4th completion of the Palestinian Top Tier. The Champion was Silwan.

== League table ==
| Rank | Team | Governorate | Pts | Notes |
|---|---|---|---|---|
| 1 | Silwan | Jerusalem | 28 | Champion |
| 2 | Al-arabi Beit Safafa | Jerusalem | 23 | |
| 3 | YMCA | Jerusalem | 22 | |
| 4 | Al-Beireh Group | Ramallah & Al-Bireh | 22 | |
| 5 | Shabab Al-Khalil | Hebron | 22 | |
