= Momen Naji =

Syrian footballer (born 1996)

Personal information
- Full name: Momen Naji
- Date of birth: 9 October 1996 (age 30)
- Place of birth: Damascus, Syria
- Height: 1.74 m (5 ft 8 1/2 in)
- Position: Left midfielder

Team information
- Current team: Al-Shorta

Senior career*
Years	Team	Apps	(Gls)
2014–2017	Al-Shorta		
2017	Al-Fotuwa		
2017–2021	Al-Jaish		
2021–	Al-Shorta		

International career^{‡}
2015–	Syria	4	(0)
- * Club domestic league appearances and goals ‡ National team caps and goals as of 25 March 2021

Momen Naji (born 9 October 1996) is a Syrian professional footballer who plays as a midfielder for Syrian club Al-Shorta and the Syrian national football team. He made his debut for the national team in a friendly against Lebanon on 24 May 2015.
