= 2017–18 Palestine Cup =

Tournament details
- Country: Palestine

Final positions
- Champions: Hilal Al-Quds Club

The 2017–18 Palestine Cup is the 2017–18 season of the top football cup in Palestine.

There are two competitions, the Gaza Strip Cup for clubs in the Gaza Strip, and the West Bank Cup for clubs in the West Bank. A two-legged Palestine Cup final is played between the cup winners of the Gaza Strip and the West Bank.

== Gaza Strip Cup ==
=== Preliminary round 1 ===
Team 1	Score	Team 2
3 Jan 2018
Al Aqsa	1 : 1 (4 : 2 p)	AL Shawka
Al Amal	2 : 0	Al Shafae
Ahli Al Nosirat	3 : 0	Al Jazeera
Al Redwan	2 : 0	AL Yarmouk
Al Ataa	0 : 0 (3 : 5 p)	Al Zaytoon

=== Preliminary round 2 ===
Team 1	Score	Team 2
7 Jan 2018
Al Aqsa	2 : 2 (7 : 8 p)	Al Awda
Ahli Al Nosirat	2 : 1	Al Esteqlal
Ittihad Dear Balah	0 : 0 (7 : 6 p)	Ahli Al Burij
Beit Hanoun	1 : 1 (2 : 4 p)	Al Mashtal
8 Jan 2018
Al Amal	1 : 1 (3 : 1 p)	Jamaee Rafah
Al Zaytoon	1 : 1 (3 : 4 p)	Namaa
Khadamat Jabalia	2 : 0	Palestine
Shabab Maan	2 : 1	Al Redwan

=== Round of 32 ===
Team 1	Score	Team 2
2 Apr 2018
Shabab Rafah	1 : 0	Ahli Beit Hanoun
Al Salah Islamic Association	4 : 5	Al Amal
Mojama Islami	2 : 2 (2 : 3 p)	Shabab Maan
Shabab Jabalia	1 : 0	Beat Lahia
Hilal Gaza	2 : 1	Al Tofah
Al Qadesia	0 : 0 (4 : 2 p)	Khadamat Al Maghazi
3 Apr 2018
Khadamat Rafah	5 : 1	Al Zaytoon
Shabab Khanyounis	3 : 0	Khadamat Al Nosirat
Khadamat Al Shatea	1 : 1 (3 : 4 p)	Namaa
Al Jala	2 : 0	Khadamat Jabalia
Al Sadaka Club	4 : 0	Ittihad Dear Balah
4 Apr 2018
Gaza Sporting Club	2 : 0	Ahli Al Nosirat
Ittihad Shojaeyya	5 : 0	Al Mashtal
Ittihad Khanyounis	1 : 1 (4 : 5 p)	Khdamat Dear Balah
Ahli Gaza	2 : 2 (3 : 5 p)	Khadamat Khanyounis
Khadamat Al Burij	0 : 0 (4 : 5 p)	Al Awda

=== Round of 16 ===
Team 1	Score	Team 2
9 Apr 2018
Shabab Khanyounis	0 : 0 (5 : 3 p)	Namaa
Shabab Jabalia	1 : 1 (4 : 2 p)	Ittihad Shojaeyya
Al Qadesia	1 : 1 (3 : 5 p)	Al Amal
Al Sadaka Club	5 : 0	Khdamat Dear Balah
10 Apr 2018
Khadamat Rafah	2 : 0	Al Awda
Shabab Rafah	2 : 2 (12 : 11 p)	Gaza Sporting Club
Hilal Gaza	4 : 2	Shabab Maan
Khadamat Khanyounis	1 : 2	Al Jala

=== Quarter-finals ===
Team 1	Score	Team 2
16 Apr 2018
Shabab Khanyounis	3 : 1	Al Amal
Shabab Jabalia	3 : 0	Hilal Gaza
17 Apr 2018
Al Sadaka Club	3 : 1	Al Jala
Shabab Rafah	1 : 0	Khadamat Rafah

=== Semi-finals ===
Team 1	Score	Team 2
23 Apr 2018
Al Sadaka Club	0 : 2	Shabab Rafah
Shabab Khanyounis	2 : 2 (3 : 1 p)	Shabab Jabalia

=== Final ===
Team 1	Score	Team 2
30 Apr 2018
Shabab Khanyounis	2 : 0	Shabab Rafah

== West Bank Cup ==
=== Preliminary round 1 ===
Team 1	Score	Team 2
15 Dec 2017
Markez Raqam Wahad	1 : 1 (7 : 6 p)	Attil
Tammon	1 : 3	Markez Nour Shams
16 Dec 2017
Markez Askar	4 : 0	Ittihad Nablus
Markez Jenin	0 : 0 (3 : 1 p)	Ahli Qalqilya
18 Dec 2017
Silwad	1 : 1 (3 : 4 p)	Shabab Abu Dies
Beit Liqya	1 : 3	Isawiya
Shuqba	2 : 1	Jabal Alzayton
19 Dec 2017
Alarabi Beit Safafa	4 : 1	Islami Sour Baher
Alshoban Almuslimin	2 : 1	Alkarmel
Dar Salah	1 : 0	Bani Naeem
Almazra Alsharqiya	1 : 0	Islami Ein Yabrud
Marah Rabah	1 : 0	Marah Mella
Surif	1 : 0	Shabab Beit Fajjar
Al Mouwathfen - Burj Alluqluq	2 : 2 (4 : 3 p)	Qibya

=== Preliminary round 2 ===
Team 1	Score	Team 2
22 Dec 2017
Marah Rabah	3 : 2	Alshoban Almuslimin
Alarabi Beit Safafa	0 : 1	Joret Alshama
23 Dec 2017
Markez Nour Shams	3 : 1	Markez Askar
Markez Raqam Wahad	1 : 3	Markez Jenin
26 Dec 2017
Isawiya	2 : 0	Shuqba
Dar Salah	0 : 0 (4 : 5 p)	Marah Rabah
Surif	1 : 4	Joret Alshama
Shabab Abu Dies	0 : 1	Ein Alsultan
27 Dec 2017
Almazra Alsharqiya	3 : 1	Al Sawahreh
Al Mouwathfen - Burj Alluqluq	1 : 1 (4 : 5 p)	Sour Baher
29 Dec 2017
Isawiya	3 : 1	Ein Alsultan
30 Dec 2017
Almazra Alsharqiya	2 : 3	Sour Baher
Surif	3 : 1	Dar Salah
3 Jan 2018
Ein Alsultan	2 : 1	Almazra Alsharqiya

=== Round of 32 ===
Team 1	Score	Team 2
16 Jan 2018
Hilal Alquds	5 : 0	Markez Jenin
Markez Balata	4 : 0	Marah Rabah
Shabab Alsamu	4 : 1	Jenin
Ahli Al Khalil	4 : 0	Silwan
17 Jan 2018
Thaqafi Tulkarm	3 : 1	Markez Nour Shams
Abna Alquds	8 : 1	Joret Alshama
Shabab Alamari	4 : 0	Beit Ommar
Hilal Areeha	2 : 2 (2 : 4 p)	Shabab Alobaideya
18 Jan 2018
Shabab Dora	1 : 1 (5 : 4 p)	Palestinian Forces
Jabal Mukaber	2 : 1	Sour Baher
Shabab Al Dharia	4 : 3	Islami Qalqilya
Mosaset Al Bireh	5 : 1	Ein Alsultan
20 Jan 2018
Taraji Wad Alness	1 : 2	Isawiya
Shabab Alkhader	4 : 1	Tubas
Markez Tulkarm	6 : 0	Surif
Shabab Al Khalil	1 : 1 (2 : 4 p)	Shabab Yatta

=== Round of 16 ===
Team 1	Score	Team 2
12 Feb 2018
Markez Tulkarm	0 : 0 (6 : 5 p)	Shabab Yatta
Shabab Dora	0 : 0 (4 : 2 p)	Jabal Mukaber
Shabab Alamari	2 : 1	Shabab Alkhader
Hilal Alquds	2 : 2 (4 : 2 p)	Shabab Alsamu
13 Feb 2018
Mosaset Al Bireh	1 : 0	Shabab Al Dharia
Thaqafi Tulkarm	2 : 1	Shabab Alobaideya
Abna Alquds	1 : 2	Markez Balata
Isawiya	1 : 2	Ahli Al Khalil

=== Quarter-finals ===
Team 1	Score	Team 2
11 Apr 2018
Markez Tulkarm	0 : 6	Markez Balata
Thaqafi Tulkarm	2 : 0	Mosaset Al Bireh
Shabab Alamari	5 : 2	Shabab Dora
Hilal Alquds	3 : 2	Ahli Al Khalil

=== Semi-finals ===
Team 1	Score	Team 2
18 Apr 2018
Markez Balata	1 : 1 (3 : 4 p)	Thaqafi Tulkarm
Shabab Alamari	0 : 2	Hilal Alquds

=== Final ===
Team 1	Score	Team 2
24 May 2018
Hilal Alquds	3 : 1	Thaqafi Tulkarm

== Palestine Cup Final ==
20 June 2018

Shabab Khanyounis	3–2	Hilal Alquds

Palestine Stadium, Gaza City
Referee: Sameh H. Alqassas
23 June 2018

Hilal Alquds	5–1	Shabab Khanyounis

Faisal Al-Husseini International Stadium, Al-Ram
Referee: Baraa Abu Asheh

== See also ==
- 2017–18 West Bank Premier League
- 2017–18 Gaza Strip Premier League
