= Sultan Al-Sowaidi =

Emirati footballer (born 1993)

Personal information
- Full name: Sultan Abdulaziz Al-Sowaidi
- Date of birth: 26 November 1993 (age 32)
- Place of birth: United Arab Emirates
- Height: 1.65 m (5 ft 5 in)
- Position: Right-back

Youth career
- Al Jazira

Senior career*
Years	Team	Apps	(Gls)
2012–2017	Al Jazira	48	(0)
2017–2023	Al Dhafra	40	(1)
2021	→ Ittihad Kalba (loan)	6	(0)
2021–2022	→ Emirates (loan)	11	(0)
- * Club domestic league appearances and goals

Sultan Al-Sowaidi (Arabic:سلطان السويدي) (born 26 November 1993) is an Emirati footballer who plays as a full back.

On 13 October 2017 he made his debut for Al Dhafra in a game against his former club and scored a stunning equaliser in the 45th minute.
