= Al-Khader Stadium =

Stadium in Al-Khader, West Bank, Palestine

Coordinates: 31°42′15.96″N 35°09′38.43″E

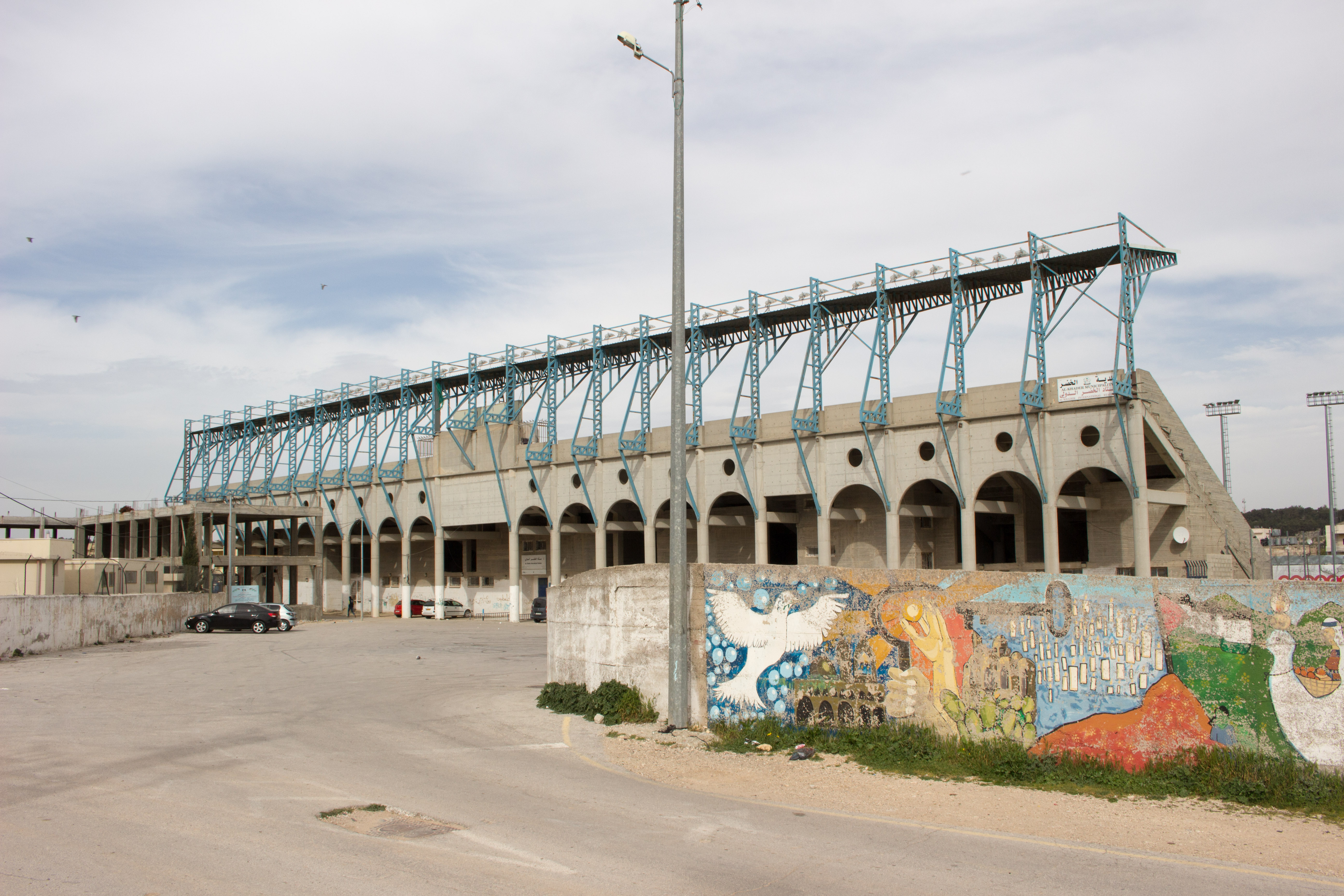
- Interactive map of Al-Khader Stadium
- Location: Al-Khader, Palestine
- Capacity: 6000

Construction
- Opened: 2007

Tenant
- Shabab Al-Khadr Club (West Bank Premier League)

Al-Khader Stadium (Arabic: ملعب الخضر) is an international football stadium in al-Khader, Palestine. It was inaugurated on August 6, 2007 with a match between local team Shabab Al-Khadr, and Maccabi Ahi Nazareth, an Israeli Arab team from Nazareth. The stadium was constructed with funding from Portugal through the Portuguese Institute for Cooperation for Development. Al-Khader Stadium cost roughly $2 million to build and could host over 6,000 spectators. It is the home stadium of Shabab Al-Khadr. In addition to football, the stadium hosts the annual al-Khader Festival of Arts and Culture and the grape festival of the town.
