= Shabab Rafah =

- Full name: Shabab Rafah Sports Club
- Founded: 1953; 73 years ago
- Ground: Rafah Municipal Stadium; Rafah, Gaza Strip (de jure Palestine)
- Capacity: 5,000
- League: Gaza Strip League

Shabab Rafah Sports Club (Arabic: نادي شباب رفح الرياضي) or simply Shabab Rafah is a Palestinian professional football club from the city of Rafah that plays in the Gaza Strip League, co-existing top flight competition with the West Bank Premier League.

== History ==
The club was founded in 1953 under the name of Al-Shoaba Club. In 1960, it changed the name to Al-Oruba Club. In 1962, the Egyptian administration in the Gaza Strip founded a Youth Care Foundation and sponsored the club who changed the name to Nadi Markaz Reayat Al-Shabab (Youth Care Center Club).

After the Six-Day War of 1967, the club's activities stopped until 1973, the year when some of the loyal club members worked for the reconstruction and the revival of the club under the new name of the Shabab Rafah Sports Club and it formed the first administrative body headed by Ali Mehdi.

== Achievements ==
- Gaza Strip League
  - Winners (2): 2008–09, 2013–14
- Palestine Cup
  - Winners (1): 2016–17
- Gaza Strip Cup
  - Winners (4): 2002–03, 2005–06, 2012, 2016–17
- Gaza Strip Super Cup
  - Winners (4): 2013, 2014, 2017, 2018
