= Shabab Dura =

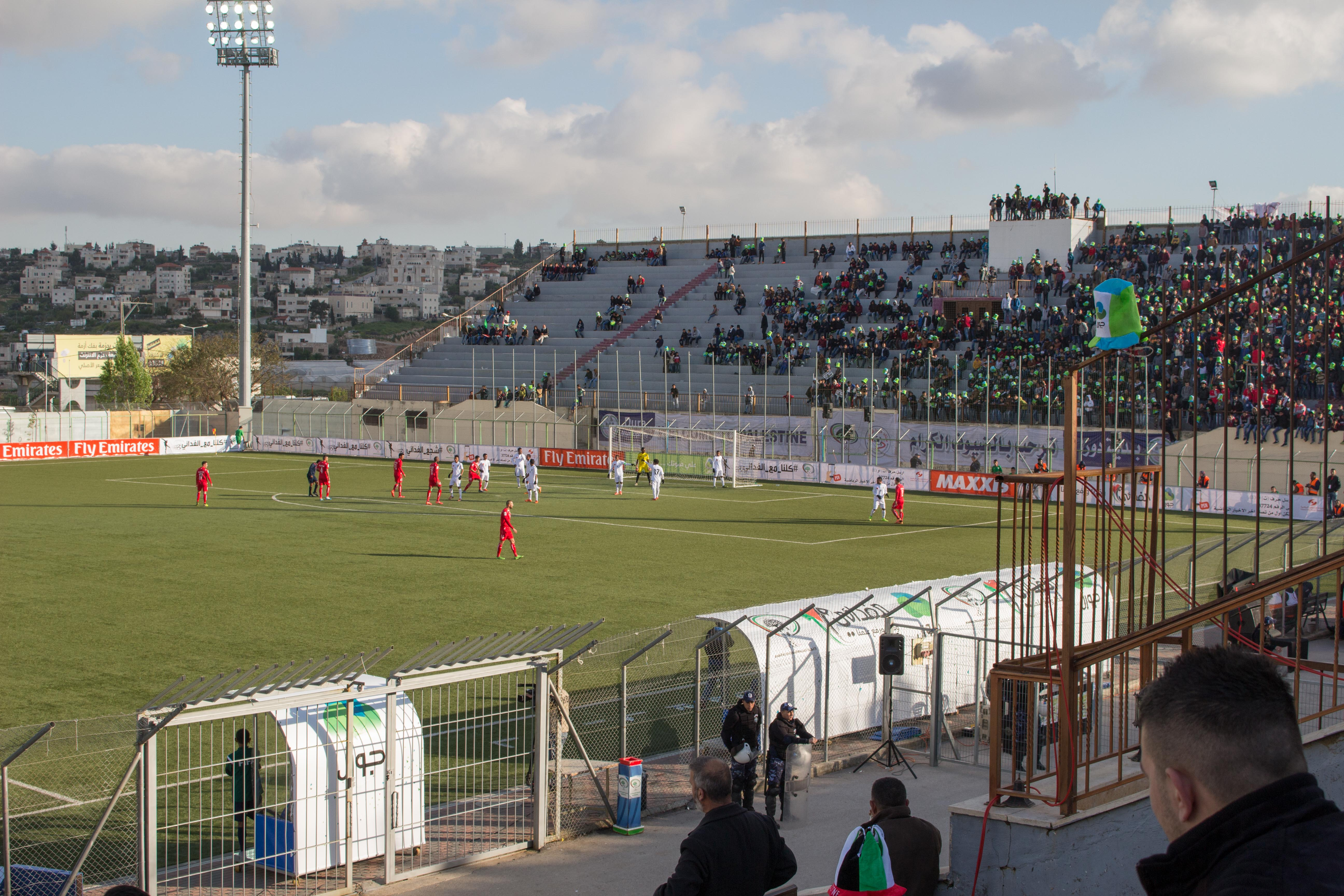
- Founded: 1943
- Ground: Dura International Stadium, Dura, Hebron
- League: West Bank Premier League

Shabab Dura Club (Arabic: نادي شباب دورا) is a Palestinian football club founded in 1943 in the city of Dura in the Hebron Governorate. The club competes in the West Bank Premier League in the West Bank.

== Achievements ==
Participation in various sports activities.
