= Shabab Yatta =

Palestinian association football club

- Full name: Shabab Yatta FC
- Founded: 1982; 44 years ago
- Ground: Yatta International Stadium, Hebron
- Capacity: 18,000
- League: West Bank Premier League

Shabab Yatta, founded in 1982, is a professional football club based in the town of Yatta, within the Hebron Governorate in the Palestinian West Bank. The club currently compete in the West Bank Premier League. The club plays out of Yatta International Stadium.
