= Palestine Cup =

- Organiser(s): Palestinian Football Association (PFA)
- Founded: 1997
- Region: Palestine
- Current champions: Shabab Khan Younes (2nd title)
- Most championships: Shabab Al-Khaleel
- 2018–19

The Palestine Cup is the main national association football competition in Palestine. It is sanctioned by the Palestinian Football Association. Past competitions were more expansive including clubs from all tiers of Palestinian football. For the 2010–11 season the PFA restricted participation to just the 12 teams of the 2010–11 West Bank Premier League.

== Format ==
The format of the 2010–11 Palestine Cup featured a group stage with two groups of six teams. After one round of play where each team in the group had played each other once, the top two teams based on points accumulated advanced to the semifinal stage. Semifinals were a two-legged affair with the aggregate winners advancing to a one-off final.

== Past winners ==
There are two competitions, the Gaza Strip Cup for clubs in the Gaza Strip, and the West Bank Cup for clubs in the West Bank. Since 2015, a two-legged Palestine Cup final is played between the cup winners of the Gaza Strip and the West Bank.

=== Gaza Strip Cup ===
Gaza Strip Cup
| Final | Winner | Score | Runner-up | Ref. |
|---|---|---|---|---|
| 1997 | Khadamat Rafah | | | |
| 1998 | Not known | | | |
| 1999 | Al-Ittihad Shejaia | 0–0 (3–2 p.) | Shabab Rafah | |
| 2000 | Shabab Khan Younes | 2–0 | Shabab Rafah | |
| 2001–02 | Not known | | | |
| 2003 | Shabab Rafah | 4–2 | Khadamat Rafah | |
| 2004 | Not known | | | |
| 2005–06 | Shabab Rafah | 2–0 | Shabab Jabalia | |
| 2005–06 | Shabab Rafah | 4–0 | Shabab Jabalia | |
| 2005–06 | Shabab Rafah won 6–0 on aggregate | | | |
| 2007 | Not known | | | |
| 2008 | Not known | | | |
| 2009 | Not known | | | |
| 2010 | Gaza | 3–0 | Sadaqa | |
| 2011 | Not known | | | |
| 2012 | Shabab Rafah | 2–0 | Mashtal | |
| 2013–14 | Khadamat Rafah | 2–2 (5–4 p.) | Al-Ittihad Shejaia | |
| 2014–15 | Al-Ittihad Shejaia | 3–0 | Khadamat Rafah | |
| 2015–16 | Shabab Khan Younes | 4–3 | Shabab Jabalia | |
| 2016–17 | Shabab Rafah | 2–0 | Khadamat Rafah | |
| 2017–18 | Shabab Khan Younes | 2–0 | Shabab Rafah | |
| 2018–19 | Khadamat Rafah | 0–0 (4–3 p.) | Ittihad Shojaeyya | |

=== West Bank Cup ===
Gaza Strip Cup
| Final | Winner | Score | Runner-up | Ref. |
|---|---|---|---|---|
| 1978 | Shabab Al-Khalil | | | |
| 1981 | Shabab Al-Khalil | | | |
| 1985 | Shabab Al-Khalil | | | |
| 1997 | Al-Bireh | | | |
| 2000 | Hilal Al-Quds | | Shabab Al-Khalil | |
| 2007–08 | Taraji Wadi Al-Nes | 1–1 (2–0 p.) | Shabab Al-Khalil | |
| 2009–10 | Taraji Wadi Al-Nes | 1–1 (4–3 p.) | Shabab Al-Khalil | |
| 2010–11 | Hilal Al-Quds | 2–0 | Shabab Al-Dhahiriya | |
| 2011–12 | Shabab Al-Dhahiriya | | | |
| 2012–13 | Shabab Al-Khalil | 3–0 | Islami Qalqilya | |
| 2013–14 | Hilal Al-Quds | 1–1 (4–2 p. | Shabab Al-Dhahiriya | |
| 2014–15 | Ahli Al-Khaleel | 0–0 (4–3 p.) | Markaz Balata | |
| 2015–16 | Ahli Al-Khaleel | 3–0 | Hilal Al-Quds | |
| 2016–17 | Ahli Al-Khaleel | 0–0 (3–1 p.) | Shabab Al-Khalil | |
| 2017–18 | Hilal Al-Quds | 3–1 | Thaqafi Tulkarem | |
| 2018–19 | Markaz Balata | 2–1 | Markaz Shabab Al Am'ari | |

=== Finals ===
Palestine Cup finals
| Season | Area | Winners | Score | Runners-up | Area | Refs |
Two-legged format
| 2014/2015 | West Bank | Ahli Al-Khaleel | 0-0 | Al-Ittihad Shejaia | Gaza Strip | |
| 2014/2015 | West Bank | Ahli Al-Khaleel | 2-1 | Al-Ittihad Shejaia | Gaza Strip | |
| 2015/2016 | West Bank | Ahli Al-Khaleel | 1-0 | Shabab Khan Younes | Gaza Strip | |
| 2015/2016 | West Bank | Ahli Al-Khaleel | 1-1 | Shabab Khan Younes | Gaza Strip | |
| 2016/2017 | Gaza Strip | Shabab Rafah | 2-0 | Ahli Al-Khaleel | West Bank | |
| 2016/2017 | Gaza Strip | Shabab Rafah | 0-0 | Ahli Al-Khaleel | West Bank | |
| 2017/2018 | West Bank | Hilal Al-Quds | 2-3 | Shabab Khan Younes | Gaza Strip | |
| 2017/2018 | West Bank | Hilal Al-Quds | 5-1 | Shabab Khan Younes | Gaza Strip | |

== See also ==
- Gaza Strip Super Cup
- West Bank Super Cup
