= Ahli Al-Khaleel =

Ahli al-Khaleel
- Full name: Ahli al-Khaleel
- Founded: 1974; 52 years ago
- Ground: Hussein Bin Ali Stadium; Hebron, Palestine
- Capacity: 8,000
- League: West Bank Premier League

Ahli al-Khaleel (Arabic: أهلي الخليل) is a Palestinian professional football team from the city of Hebron, that plays in the West Bank Premier League.

== History ==
Ahli Al-Khaleel won the 2015 edition of the Palestine Cup and qualified for the 2016 AFC Cup.

=== Domestic history ===
Season	League									Palestine Cup	Top goalscorer		Manager
Season	Div.	Pos.	Pl.	W	D	L	GS	GA	P	Palestine Cup	Name	League	Manager
2012–13	1st	6	22	6	10	6	35	38	28	Quarter-finals			
2013–14	1st	8	22	6	7	9	28	34	25	Round of 16			
2014–15	1st	7	22	8	4	10	29	33	28	Winners			
2015–16	1st	1	22	13	6	3	38	22	44	Winners			
2016–17	1st	3	22	11	6	5	35	21	39	Runner-up			
2017–18	1st	2	22	14	6	2	51	20	45	Quarter-finals			

=== Continental history ===
As of 11 May 2016.

Season	Competition	Round	Club	Home	Away
2016	AFC Cup	Play-off round	(Tajikistan) Khujand	1–0	
2016	AFC Cup	Group Stage	(Bahrain) Al-Muharraq	1–1	1–2
2016	AFC Cup	Group Stage	(Oman) Fanja	2–1	3–3
2016	AFC Cup	Group Stage	(Syria) Al-Jaish	0–3	0–1

== Honours ==
- Palestine Cup
  - Champions (2): 2014–15, 2015–16
- West Bank Super Cup
  - Champions (2): 2015, 2016
- West Bank Cup
  - Champions (3): 2014–15, 2015–16, 2016–17

== Current squad ==
As of 21 July 2020

Note: Flags indicate national team as defined under FIFA eligibility rules; some limited exceptions apply. Players may hold more than one non-FIFA nationality.

No.	Pos.	Nation	Player
2	MF	PLE	Mohammed Albadan
3	DF	PLE	Mohammed Saleh
4	DF	ISR	Rami Asahli
5	MF	LBN	Hussein Hasan
6	FW	PLE	Mahmoud Dawoud
10	MF	PLE	Mosab Salem
11	MF	PLE	Khaldun Al Halman
12	FW	PLE	Mahmoud Wadi
17	FW	UZB	Aziz Joraev

No.	Pos.	Nation	Player
18	MF	PLE	Jonathan Zorrilla
20	DF	PLE	Fady Dwaik
21	DF	PLE	Ahmed Harbi
22	MF	PLE	Islam Batran
27	MF	PLE	Roberto Kettlun
33	GK	PLE	Naim Abuaker
35	GK	PLE	Azmi Shweiki
77	MF	PLE	Ahmad Maher Wridat
