= Markaz Tulkarem =

- Full name: Markaz Tulkarem FC
- League: West Bank Premier League

Merkaz Shabab Tulkarem is a Palestinian professional football team based in Tulkarem that plays in the West Bank Premier League.

The club won the West Bank League in 1980 and 1984.
