= Shabab Alsamu =

- Full name: Nadi Shabab Alsamu Al-Riyadhi
- Founded: 1976; 50 years ago
- Ground: Hussein Bin Ali Stadium; Hebron, Palestine
- Capacity: 8,000
- League: West Bank Premier League

Nadi Shabab Alsamu Al-Riyadhi or simply Shabab Alsamu (شباب السموع) is a Palestinian professional football club based in Hebron, that plays in the West Bank Premier League. The club was founded in 1976. In 2018 Shabab Alsamu was one of the over 130 Palestinian sports teams that signed a letter to Adidas CEO Kasper Rørsted calling for an end to Adidas sponsorship of the Israel Football Association.
