= Shabab Al-Khader SC =

Shabab Al-Khader
- Full name: Shabab Al-Khader Sports Club
- Founded: 1967; 59 years ago
- Ground: Al-Khader Stadium; Bethlehem, Palestine
- Capacity: 6,100
- League: West Bank Premier League

Shabab Al-Khader Sports Club Arabic: نادي شباب الخضر الرياضي) is a professional football club based in the town of Al-Khader, within the Bethlehem Governorate in the Palestinian West Bank. The club currently competes in the West Bank Premier League. Shabab Al-Khadr plays out of Al-Khader Stadium.

== History ==
Shabab Al Khadr were founded in 1956. When their new stadium was inaugurated in 2007, the club played a match against Maccabi Ahi Nazareth, an Israeli Arab team from Nazareth.

== Notable players ==
Note: Flags indicate national team as defined under FIFA eligibility rules; some limited exceptions apply. Players may hold more than one non-FIFA nationality.

No.	Pos.	Nation	Player
—	GK	PLE	Rami Hamadi (Played for the Palestinian National Team)
—	DF	PLE	Mousa Abu Jazar (Played for the Palestinian National Team)
