= Thaqafi Tulkarem =

- Full name: Nadi Thaqafi Tulkarm Al-Riyadhi
- Founded: 1970; 56 years ago
- Ground: Jamal Ghanem Stadium
- Capacity: 4,000
- League: West Bank Premier League

Nadi Thaqafi Tulkarm Al-Riyadhi or simply Thaqafi Tulkarem is a Palestinian professional football team based in Tulkarem, that plays in the West Bank Premier League.
