= 2023–24 Palestine Professional League =

Palestine Professional League
- Season: 2023–24
- Dates: Gaza Strip: 11 August 2023 – cancelled West Bank: 17 August 2023 – cancelled
- Matches: 32
- Goals: 82 (2.56 per match)
- Top goalscorer: Hamza Issa (5 goals)
- All statistics correct as of 26 August 2023.

The Palestine Professional League started on 11 August 2023. Jabal Al-Mukaber is the title holder of the West Bank League and Khadamat Rafah is the defending champions in the Gaza Strip.

The fixtures of the Gaza Strip Premier Division were announced on 11 July 2023. The fixtures of the West Bank League were announced on 29 July 2023. The season ended and was suspended indefinitely effective 7 October 2023 morning due to security concerns related to the Gaza war.

== Teams ==
=== Team changes ===
Promoted from 2022–23 First Division League	Relegated from 2022–23 Palestine Professional League
Shabab Al-Ubaidiya; Al-Sawahra; Ahli Gaza; Khadamat Al-Shatea	Shabab Al-Am'ari; Islami Qalqilyah; Khadamat Al-Nusseirat; Shabab Al-Zawaida

Shabab Al-Ubaidiya will play for the first time in its history in the Professional League following a 3–0 forfeit win over Markaz Nour Shams. The last promoted team from the West Bank First Division was Al-Sawahra, which will also participate for the first time after its 5–0 victory over Silwan.

=== Stadiums and locations ===
Team	Location	Stadium	Capacity	Ref.
Hilal Al-Quds	Jerusalem	Faisal Al-Husseini International Stadium	12,000	
Shabab Al-Khalil	Dura	Dura International Stadium	18,000	
Shabab Al-Dhahiriya	Al-Khader	Al-Khader Stadium	6,000	
Markaz Balata	Jenin	Arab American University Stadium	10,000	
Thaqafi Tulkarem	Jenin	Arab American University Stadium	10,000	
Taraji Wadi Al-Nes	Al-Khader	Al-Khader Stadium	6,000	
Shabab Alsamu	Dura	Dura International Stadium	18,000	
Al-Bireh	Jerusalem	Faisal Al-Husseini International Stadium	12,000	
Ahli Al-Khalil	Hebron	Al-Hussein Stadium	8,000	
Jabal Al Mukaber	Jerusalem	Faisal Al-Husseini International Stadium	12,000	
Khadamat Rafah	Rafah	Rafah Municipal Stadium	5,000	
Al-Hilal	Gaza	Palestine Stadium	10,000	
Ittihad Beit Hanoun	Beit Hanoun	Beit Hanoun Stadium	5,000	
Shabab Khanyounis	Khan Younis	Khanyounis Municipal Stadium	4,000	
Al-Sadaqa	Gaza	Palestine Stadium	10,000	
Shabab Jabalia	Beit Hanoun	Beit Hanoun Stadium	5,000	
Gaza Sports	Gaza	Palestine Stadium	10,000	
Ittihad Al-Shujaiya	Gaza	Al-Yarmouk Stadium	8,000	
Ittihad Khanyounis	Khan Younis	Sports City Stadium		

== League table ==
=== West Bank ===
Pos	Team	Pld	W	D	L	GF	GA	GD	Pts	Qualification or relegation
1	Shabab Al-Dhahiriya	2	2	0	0	9	1	+8	6	Qualification for the AFC Challenge League
2	Jabal Al Mukaber	2	1	1	0	7	3	+4	4	
3	Thaqafi Tulkarem	2	1	1	0	7	4	+3	4	
4	Taraji Wadi Al-Nes	2	1	1	0	2	1	+1	4	
5	Markaz Balata	1	1	0	0	1	0	+1	3	
6	Shabab Alsamu	2	0	2	0	2	2	0	2	
7	Ahli Al-Khalil	2	0	1	1	1	2	−1	1	
8	Al-Sawahra	2	0	1	1	1	8	−7	1	
9	Al-Bireh	2	0	1	1	2	5	−3	1	
10	Shabab Al-Khalil	0	0	0	0	0	0	0	0	
11	Shabab Al-Ubaidiya	2	0	0	2	1	3	−2	0	Relegation to First Division
12	Hilal Al-Quds	1	0	0	1	0	4	−4	0	Relegation to First Division

Updated to match(es) played on 26 August 2023. Source: Goalzz

=== Gaza Strip ===
Pos	Team	Pld	W	D	L	GF	GA	GD	Pts	Qualification or relegation
1	Ittihad Khanyounis	3	2	1	0	5	3	+2	7	
2	Ahli Gaza	3	1	2	0	6	2	+4	5	
3	Shabab Jabalia	3	1	2	0	5	4	+1	5	
4	Ittihad Al-Shujaiya	2	1	1	0	5	2	+3	4	
5	Shabab Rafah	3	1	1	1	5	4	+1	4	
6	Khadamat Al-Shatea	2	1	1	0	3	2	+1	4	
7	Al-Sadaqa	3	1	1	1	4	4	0	4	
8	Khadamat Rafah	2	1	0	1	3	3	0	3	
9	Gaza Sports	3	0	2	1	2	3	−1	2	
10	Ittihad Beit Hanoun	3	0	2	1	5	8	−3	2	
11	Shabab Khanyounis	3	0	1	2	4	10	−6	1	Relegation to First Division
12	Al-Hilal	2	0	0	2	2	4	−2	0	Relegation to First Division

Updated to match(es) played on 26 August 2023. Source: Goalzz

== Statistics ==
=== Top goalscorers ===
Rank	Player	Club	Goals
1	(Palestine) Hamza Issa	Thaqafi Tulkarem	5
2	(Palestine) Khaled Al-Nabris	Ittihad Khanyounis	4
2	(Palestine) Mohammed Maraaba	Jabal Al Mukaber	4
2	(Palestine) Suleiman Obeid	Khadamat Al-Shatea	4
