= Thousand Martyrs' Cup =

Tournament details
- Country: Palestine
- Dates: 4 September 2026 –
- Teams: 244

Tournament statistics
- Matches played: 17
- Goals scored: 76 (4.47 per match)
- Top goal scorer(s): Hamza Issa (8 goals)
- All statistics correct as of 21 September 2026.

The Thousand Martyrs' Cup (Note: Arabic: كأس الألف شهيد) will mark the resumption of domestic Palestinian football in the West Bank and the Gaza Strip following a suspension that began in October 2023. The Palestinian Football Association met with representatives of West Bank clubs on 4 July 2026 to discuss restarting activities; President Jibril Rajoub disclosed plans aiming to launch a championship at the start of September.

Officially announced on 1 August, the tournament is scheduled to include football clubs from the West Bank, Jerusalem, the Gaza Strip, and the diaspora. The competition commenced on 4 September with three simultaneous non-competitive matches alongside an opening ceremony. The Palestine Professional League is scheduled to return in its regular format next season.

This event is the first official competition organized by the Palestinian Football Association since 6 October 2023, when the 2023–24 season was halted at the start of round four and subsequently canceled. In a meeting held on 6 July 2025, Rajoub stated that there is a desire for the Palestinian League to return, provided that mandatory conditions are met. In turn, Sami Abu Al-Hossain, Assistant Secretary-General of the Association in the Southern Governorates, stated that widespread destruction occurred to sports facilities in the Gaza Strip, with the exception of the Rafah Municipal Stadium.

== Schedule ==
Matchday	Date
1	11–13 September 2026

== Teams ==
A total of 243 teams will participate, with the first round featuring a group-stage competition organized by governorate. 25 August was established as the final date for clubs to confirm their entry. The draw took place on 1 September. Participating teams were allocated into groups consisting of three, four or five teams. The group winners and runners-up will progress to the second round.

== Opening matches ==
All times are denoted in UTC+3.

4 September 2026	Jabal Al-Mukaber	3–2	Shabab Al-Khaleel	Al-Ram, West Bank
18:00	Obaid 28', 42'; Salim 62' (pen.)		Taweel 69' (pen.), 90+1' (pen.)	Stadium: Faisal Al-Husseini International Stadium; Referee: Mohammad Khalil

4 September 2026	Shabab Rafah	0–2	Khadamat Rafah	Deir al-Balah, Gaza Strip
18:00			al-Jarmi; al-Ayadi	Stadium: Ittihad Deir al-Balah Club Stadium

4 September 2026	Al-Ansar	2–0	Al-Nahda	Ain al-Hilweh, Lebanon
18:00	Sarhan			Stadium: Martyr Abu Jihad al-Wazir Stadium

== Group stage ==
=== Northern Governorates ===
==== Nablus ====
===== Group 1 =====
Pos	Team	Pld	W	D	L	GF	GA	GD	Pts	Qualification
1	Markaz Balata	0	0	0	0	0	0	0	0	Advance to the second round
2	Center No. 1	0	0	0	0	0	0	0	0	Advance to the second round
3	Ahli Balata Club	0	0	0	0	0	0	0	0	
4	Burqa Club	0	0	0	0	0	0	0	0	

Updated to match(es) played on 2 Oct 2026. Source: PFA
Rules for classification: Tiebreakers

===== Group 2 =====
Pos	Team	Pld	W	D	L	GF	GA	GD	Pts	Qualification
1	Markaz Shabab Askar	0	0	0	0	0	0	0	0	Advance to the second round
2	Hitteen Club	0	0	0	0	0	0	0	0	Advance to the second round
3	Al-Karama Club	0	0	0	0	0	0	0	0	
4	Beit Furik Club	0	0	0	0	0	0	0	0	

Updated to match(es) played on 27 September 2026. Source: PFA
Rules for classification: Tiebreakers

==== South Nablus ====
===== Group 1 =====
Pos	Team	Pld	W	D	L	GF	GA	GD	Pts	Qualification
1	Madama Club	0	0	0	0	0	0	0	0	Advance to the second round
2	Talfit Club	0	0	0	0	0	0	0	0	Advance to the second round
3	Duma Club	0	0	0	0	0	0	0	0	
4	Beita Club	0	0	0	0	0	0	0	0	
5	Qaryut Club	0	0	0	0	0	0	0	0	

Updated to match(es) played on 3 October 2026. Source: PFA
Rules for classification: Tiebreakers

===== Group 2 =====
Pos	Team	Pld	W	D	L	GF	GA	GD	Pts	Qualification
1	Burin Club	0	0	0	0	0	0	0	0	Advance to the second round
2	Orif Club	0	0	0	0	0	0	0	0	Advance to the second round
3	Yatma Club	0	0	0	0	0	0	0	0	
4	Qusra Club	0	0	0	0	0	0	0	0	
5	Salfit Club	0	0	0	0	0	0	0	0	

Updated to match(es) played on 2 October 2026. Source: PFA
Rules for classification: Tiebreakers

==== Jenin-Tubas ====
===== Group 1 =====
Pos	Team	Pld	W	D	L	GF	GA	GD	Pts	Qualification
1	Tubas Club	0	0	0	0	0	0	0	0	Advance to the second round
2	Al-Yamun Club	0	0	0	0	0	0	0	0	Advance to the second round
3	Tammun Club	0	0	0	0	0	0	0	0	
4	Burqin Club	0	0	0	0	0	0	0	0	
5	Jaba’ Club	0	0	0	0	0	0	0	0	

Updated to match(es) played on 11 September 2026. Source: PFA
Rules for classification: Tiebreakers

===== Group 2 =====
Pos	Team	Pld	W	D	L	GF	GA	GD	Pts	Qualification
1	Jenin Club	1	1	0	0	3	0	+3	3	Advance to the second round
2	Barta’a Club	0	0	0	0	0	0	0	0	Advance to the second round
3	Silat al-Harithiya Club	0	0	0	0	0	0	0	0	
4	Jalbun Club	0	0	0	0	0	0	0	0	
5	Tayasir Club	1	0	0	1	0	3	−3	0	

Updated to match(es) played on 12 September 2026. Source: PFA
Rules for classification: Tiebreakers

==== Qalqilya-Salfit ====
===== Group 1 =====
Pos	Team	Pld	W	D	L	GF	GA	GD	Pts	Qualification
1	Islami Qalqilya Club	1	1	0	0	9	0	+9	3	Advance to the second round
2	Az-Zawiya Club	0	0	0	0	0	0	0	0	Advance to the second round
3	Sarra Club	0	0	0	0	0	0	0	0	
4	Deir Ballut Club	0	0	0	0	0	0	0	0	
5	Sanniriya Club	1	0	0	1	0	9	−9	0	

Updated to match(es) played on 11 September 2026. Source: PFA
Rules for classification: Tiebreakers

===== Group 2 =====
Pos	Team	Pld	W	D	L	GF	GA	GD	Pts	Qualification
1	Ahli Qalqilyah	1	1	0	0	8	0	+8	3	Advance to the second round
2	Habla Club	0	0	0	0	0	0	0	0	Advance to the second round
3	Qarawat Bani Hassan Club	0	0	0	0	0	0	0	0	
4	Hajjah Club	1	0	0	1	0	8	−8	0	

Updated to match(es) played on 12 September 2026. Source: PFA
Rules for classification: Tiebreakers

==== Tulkarem ====
===== Group 1 =====
Pos	Team	Pld	W	D	L	GF	GA	GD	Pts	Qualification
1	Markaz Tulkarem	1	1	0	0	10	0	+10	3	Advance to the second round
2	Kafr al-Labad Club	0	0	0	0	0	0	0	0	Advance to the second round
3	Shuweika Club	0	0	0	0	0	0	0	0	
4	Illar Club	1	0	0	1	0	10	−10	0	

Updated to match(es) played on 11 September 2026. Source: PFA
Rules for classification: Tiebreakers

===== Group 2 =====
Pos	Team	Pld	W	D	L	GF	GA	GD	Pts	Qualification
1	Thaqafi Tulkarem (A)	2	2	0	0	16	1	+15	6	Advance to the second round
2	Attil Club (A)	2	1	0	1	6	8	−2	3	Advance to the second round
3	Far’un Club (E)	2	0	0	2	1	14	−13	0	

Source: PFA
Rules for classification: Tiebreakers
(A) Advance to a further round; (E) Eliminated

==== Hebron ====
===== Group 1 =====
Pos	Team	Pld	W	D	L	GF	GA	GD	Pts	Qualification
1	Ahli Al-Khaleel	1	1	0	0	5	0	+5	3	Advance to the second round
2	International Youth Academy	1	1	0	0	3	0	+3	3	Advance to the second round
3	Shabab Taffuh	1	0	0	1	0	3	−3	0	
4	Tariq ibn Ziyad	1	0	0	1	0	5	−5	0	

Updated to match(es) played on 12 September 2026. Source: PFA
Rules for classification: Tiebreakers

===== Group 2 =====
Pos	Team	Pld	W	D	L	GF	GA	GD	Pts	Qualification
1	Shabab Yatta	1	1	0	0	6	0	+6	3	Advance to the second round
2	Tarqumiya	1	1	0	0	2	1	+1	3	Advance to the second round
3	Khallet al-Maya	1	0	0	1	1	2	−1	0	
4	Beit Ula	1	0	0	1	0	6	−6	0	

Updated to match(es) played on 11 September 2026. Source: PFA
Rules for classification: Tiebreakers

===== Group 3 =====
Pos	Team	Pld	W	D	L	GF	GA	GD	Pts	Qualification
1	Shabab Al-Khaleel	1	1	0	0	11	0	+11	3	Advance to the second round
2	Beit ar-Rush	1	1	0	0	2	0	+2	3	Advance to the second round
3	Beit Awwa	1	0	0	1	0	2	−2	0	
4	Istiqlal Yatta	1	0	0	1	0	11	−11	0	

Updated to match(es) played on 13 September 2026. Source: PFA
Rules for classification: Tiebreakers

===== Group 4 =====
Pos	Team	Pld	W	D	L	GF	GA	GD	Pts	Qualification
1	Beit Ummar	0	0	0	0	0	0	0	0	Advance to the second round
2	Karmel Yatta	0	0	0	0	0	0	0	0	Advance to the second round
3	Bani Na‘im	0	0	0	0	0	0	0	0	
4	Markaz Al-Fawwar	0	0	0	0	0	0	0	0	

First match(es) will be played: TBD. Source: PFA
Rules for classification: Tiebreakers

===== Group 5 =====
Pos	Team	Pld	W	D	L	GF	GA	GD	Pts	Qualification
1	Shabab Al-Dhahiriya SC	0	0	0	0	0	0	0	0	Advance to the second round
2	Idhna	0	0	0	0	0	0	0	0	Advance to the second round
3	Rabud	0	0	0	0	0	0	0	0	
4	Sa‘ir	0	0	0	0	0	0	0	0	

First match(es) will be played: TBD. Source: PFA
Rules for classification: Tiebreakers

===== Group 6 =====
Pos	Team	Pld	W	D	L	GF	GA	GD	Pts	Qualification
1	as-Samu‘	0	0	0	0	0	0	0	0	Advance to the second round
2	Dura	0	0	0	0	0	0	0	0	Advance to the second round
3	Halhul	0	0	0	0	0	0	0	0	
4	ar-Ramadin	0	0	0	0	0	0	0	0	

First match(es) will be played: TBD. Source: PFA
Rules for classification: Tiebreakers

===== Group 7 =====
Pos	Team	Pld	W	D	L	GF	GA	GD	Pts	Qualification
1	Kharas	0	0	0	0	0	0	0	0	Advance to the second round
2	Masafer Yatta	0	0	0	0	0	0	0	0	Advance to the second round
3	al-Arroub	0	0	0	0	0	0	0	0	
4	Surif	0	0	0	0	0	0	0	0	

First match(es) will be played: TBD. Source: PFA
Rules for classification: Tiebreakers

==== Bethlehem ====
===== Group 1 =====
Pos	Team	Pld	W	D	L	GF	GA	GD	Pts	Qualification
1	Taraji Wadi Al-Nes	1	1	0	0	3	1	+2	3	Advance to the second round
2	Shabab Beit Fajjar	1	1	0	0	3	1	+2	3	Advance to the second round
3	AOD Sports Union	1	0	0	1	1	3	−2	0	
4	Lajee Celtic	1	0	0	1	1	3	−2	0	

Updated to match(es) played on 13 September 2026. Source: PFA
Rules for classification: Tiebreakers

11 September 2026 1	Taraji Wadi Al-Nes	3–1	Lajee Celtic	Al-Khader
16:30	Issa (pen.); Nu'man		[[]] (pen.)	Stadium: Al-Khader Stadium

13 September 2026 1	AOD Sports Union	1–3	Shabab Beit Fajjar	Al-Khader
18:00				Stadium: Al-Khader Stadium

===== Group 2 =====
Pos	Team	Pld	W	D	L	GF	GA	GD	Pts	Qualification
1	Beit Sahour	1	1	0	0	2	0	+2	3	Advance to the second round
2	Dar Salah	1	1	0	0	3	2	+1	3	Advance to the second round
3	Islami Bethlehem	1	0	0	1	2	3	−1	0	
4	Wadi Rahhal	1	0	0	1	0	2	−2	0	

Updated to match(es) played on 12 September 2026. Source: PFA
Rules for classification: Tiebreakers

12 September 2026 1	Wadi Rahhal	0–2	Beit Sahour	Al-Khader
16:30				Stadium: Al-Khader Stadium

12 September 2026 1	Dar Salah	3–2	Islami Bethlehem	Ubeidiya
16:30				Stadium: Al-Ubeidiya Stadium

===== Group 3 =====
Pos	Team	Pld	W	D	L	GF	GA	GD	Pts	Qualification
1	al-Ubeidiya	0	0	0	0	0	0	0	0	Advance to the second round
2	Nahalin	0	0	0	0	0	0	0	0	Advance to the second round
3	Battir	0	0	0	0	0	0	0	0	
4	Za‘tara	0	0	0	0	0	0	0	0	

First match(es) will be played: TBD. Source: PFA
Rules for classification: Tiebreakers

===== Group 4 =====
Pos	Team	Pld	W	D	L	GF	GA	GD	Pts	Qualification
1	Marah Rabah	0	0	0	0	0	0	0	0	Advance to the second round
2	al-Doha	0	0	0	0	0	0	0	0	Advance to the second round
3	Marah Ma‘alla	0	0	0	0	0	0	0	0	
4	Umm Tuba	0	0	0	0	0	0	0	0	

First match(es) will be played: TBD. Source: PFA
Rules for classification: Tiebreakers

===== Group 5 =====
Pos	Team	Pld	W	D	L	GF	GA	GD	Pts	Qualification
1	Beit Jala	0	0	0	0	0	0	0	0	Advance to the second round
2	al-Khader	0	0	0	0	0	0	0	0	Advance to the second round
3	al-Maliha	0	0	0	0	0	0	0	0	
4	al-Duheisha	0	0	0	0	0	0	0	0	

First match(es) will be played: TBD. Source: PFA
Rules for classification: Tiebreakers

==== Jerusalem-Jericho ====
===== Group 1 =====
Pos	Team	Pld	W	D	L	GF	GA	GD	Pts	Qualification
1	Abna’ Al-Quds	1	1	0	0	3	0	+3	3	Advance to the second round
2	Jaba‘	1	0	1	0	2	2	0	1	Advance to the second round
3	al-Zubeidat	1	0	1	0	2	2	0	1	
4	Jabal al-Zaytoun	0	0	0	0	0	0	0	0	
5	Islami Sur Baher	1	0	0	1	0	3	−3	0	

Updated to match(es) played on 12 September 2026. Source: PFA
Rules for classification: Tiebreakers

11 September 2026 1	Jaba‘	2–2	al-Zubeidat	Jericho
17:00				Stadium: Jericho International Stadium

12 September 2026 1	Islami Sur Baher	0–3	Abna’ Al-Quds	Al-Eizariya
16:00				Stadium: Al-Eizariya Stadium

===== Group 2 =====
Pos	Team	Pld	W	D	L	GF	GA	GD	Pts	Qualification
1	Al-Isawiya	1	1	0	0	14	1	+13	3	Advance to the second round
2	Hilal Al-Quds	1	1	0	0	3	0	+3	3	Advance to the second round
3	Abu Dis	0	0	0	0	0	0	0	0	
4	Al-Asima	1	0	0	1	0	3	−3	0	
5	Muslim Youth Association/al-Ram	1	0	0	1	1	14	−13	0	

Updated to match(es) played on 12 September 2026. Source: PFA
Rules for classification: Tiebreakers

11 September 2026 1	Hilal Al-Quds	3–0	Al-Asima	Al-Khader
19:30	Abumayyala (pen.); Jaafrah; Farawi		Red card	Stadium: Al-Khader Stadium

12 September 2026 1	Muslim Youth Association/al-Ram	1–14	Al-Isawiya	Jericho
17:00				Stadium: Jericho International Stadium

===== Group 3 =====
Pos	Team	Pld	W	D	L	GF	GA	GD	Pts	Qualification
1	Jabal Al-Mukaber	0	0	0	0	0	0	0	0	Advance to the second round
2	al-Eizariya	0	0	0	0	0	0	0	0	Advance to the second round
3	al-Jib	0	0	0	0	0	0	0	0	
4	Biddu	0	0	0	0	0	0	0	0	

First match(es) will be played: TBD. Source: PFA
Rules for classification: Tiebreakers

===== Group 4 =====
Pos	Team	Pld	W	D	L	GF	GA	GD	Pts	Qualification
1	Islami Silwan	0	0	0	0	0	0	0	0	Advance to the second round
2	Hizma	0	0	0	0	0	0	0	0	Advance to the second round
3	al-Jiftlik	0	0	0	0	0	0	0	0	
4	Anata Club	0	0	0	0	0	0	0	0	

First match(es) will be played: TBD. Source: PFA
Rules for classification: Tiebreakers

===== Group 5 =====
Pos	Team	Pld	W	D	L	GF	GA	GD	Pts	Qualification
1	al-Arabi Beit Safafa	0	0	0	0	0	0	0	0	Advance to the second round
2	Silwan	0	0	0	0	0	0	0	0	Advance to the second round
3	Beit Hanina	0	0	0	0	0	0	0	0	
4	Ein al-Sultan	0	0	0	0	0	0	0	0	

First match(es) will be played: TBD. Source: PFA
Rules for classification: Tiebreakers

===== Group 6 =====
Pos	Team	Pld	W	D	L	GF	GA	GD	Pts	Qualification
1	Al-Muwathafin – Burj al-Laqlaq	0	0	0	0	0	0	0	0	Advance to the second round
2	Qalandiya	0	0	0	0	0	0	0	0	Advance to the second round
3	Ahli al-Ram	0	0	0	0	0	0	0	0	
4	Aqabat Jabr	0	0	0	0	0	0	0	0	

First match(es) will be played: TBD. Source: PFA
Rules for classification: Tiebreakers

==== Ramallah-Al-Bireh ====
===== Group 1 =====
Pos	Team	Pld	W	D	L	GF	GA	GD	Pts	Qualification
1	Al-Bireh Youth Foundation	1	1	0	0	3	1	+2	3	Advance to the second round
2	Beit Leqia	1	1	0	0	2	1	+1	3	Advance to the second round
3	Deir Ammar Center	0	0	0	0	0	0	0	0	
4	Dura al-Qar‘	1	0	0	1	1	2	−1	0	
5	Mazari‘ al-Nubani	1	0	0	1	1	3	−2	0	

Updated to match(es) played on 13 September 2026. Source: PFA
Rules for classification: Tiebreakers

11 September 2026 1	Al-Bireh Youth Foundation	3–1	Mazari‘ al-Nubani	Al-Bireh
19:30				Stadium: Majed Asad Stadium

13 September 2026 1	Beit Leqia	2–1	Dura al-Qar‘	Al-Bireh
19:00				Stadium: Majed Asad Stadium

===== Group 2 =====
Pos	Team	Pld	W	D	L	GF	GA	GD	Pts	Qualification
1	Qibya	1	0	1	0	1	1	0	1	Advance to the second round
2	Islami Ein Yabrud	1	0	1	0	1	1	0	1	Advance to the second round
3	Markaz Shabab Al-Am'ari	1	1	0	0	13	0	+13	3	
4	al-Shurta	0	0	0	0	0	0	0	0	
5	Ni‘lin	1	0	0	1	0	13	−13	0	

Updated to match(es) played on 12 September 2026. Source: PFA
Rules for classification: Tiebreakers

11 September 2026 1	Qibya	1–1	Islami Ein Yabrud	Al-Bireh
16:30	Qatnah 2'		Hweih (pen.)	Stadium: Majed Asad Stadium

12 September 2026 1	Markaz Shabab Al-Am'ari	13–0	Ni‘lin	Al-Bireh
19:30				Stadium: Majed Asad Stadium

===== Group 3 =====
Pos	Team	Pld	W	D	L	GF	GA	GD	Pts	Qualification
1	Palestinian Forces	1	1	0	0	7	0	+7	3	Advance to the second round
2	Deir Nidham	1	1	0	0	5	1	+4	3	Advance to the second round
3	Palestinian American Club	0	0	0	0	0	0	0	0	
4	Ras Karkar	1	0	0	1	1	5	−4	0	
5	Deir Qaddis	1	0	0	1	0	7	−7	0	

Updated to match(es) played on 13 September 2026. Source: PFA
Rules for classification: Tiebreakers

12 September 2026 1	Palestinian Forces	7–0	Deir Qaddis	Saffa
16:00				Stadium: Ittihad Saffa Stadium

13 September 2026 1	Deir Nidham	5–1	Ras Karkar	Saffa
16:00				Stadium: Ittihad Saffa Stadium

===== Group 4 =====
Pos	Team	Pld	W	D	L	GF	GA	GD	Pts	Qualification
1	Abwein	0	0	0	0	0	0	0	0	Advance to the second round
2	Beitillu	0	0	0	0	0	0	0	0	Advance to the second round
3	Abu Falah	0	0	0	0	0	0	0	0	
4	al-Lubban al-Gharbi	0	0	0	0	0	0	0	0	

First match(es) will be played: TBD. Source: PFA
Rules for classification: Tiebreakers

===== Group 5 =====
Pos	Team	Pld	W	D	L	GF	GA	GD	Pts	Qualification
1	al-Jalazun Center	0	0	0	0	0	0	0	0	Advance to the second round
2	Beit Sira	0	0	0	0	0	0	0	0	Advance to the second round
3	Beit Ur al-Tahta	0	0	0	0	0	0	0	0	
4	al-Sharafa Club – Satah Marhaba	0	0	0	0	0	0	0	0	

First match(es) will be played: TBD. Source: PFA
Rules for classification: Tiebreakers

===== Group 6 =====
Pos	Team	Pld	W	D	L	GF	GA	GD	Pts	Qualification
1	al-Mughayyir	0	0	0	0	0	0	0	0	Advance to the second round
2	Saffa	0	0	0	0	0	0	0	0	Advance to the second round
3	Beitunia	0	0	0	0	0	0	0	0	
4	Silwad	0	0	0	0	0	0	0	0	

First match(es) will be played: TBD. Source: PFA
Rules for classification: Tiebreakers

===== Group 7 =====
Pos	Team	Pld	W	D	L	GF	GA	GD	Pts	Qualification
1	Islami Ramallah	0	0	0	0	0	0	0	0	Advance to the second round
2	an-Nabi Salih	0	0	0	0	0	0	0	0	Advance to the second round
3	Ittihad Bani Zaid	0	0	0	0	0	0	0	0	
4	Kafr Ni‘ma	0	0	0	0	0	0	0	0	

First match(es) will be played: TBD. Source: PFA
Rules for classification: Tiebreakers

===== Group 8 =====
Pos	Team	Pld	W	D	L	GF	GA	GD	Pts	Qualification
1	al-Mazra‘a al-Qibliya	0	0	0	0	0	0	0	0	Advance to the second round
2	al-Mazra‘a ash-Sharqiya	0	0	0	0	0	0	0	0	Advance to the second round
3	Ein Siniya	0	0	0	0	0	0	0	0	
4	Deir Ibzi‘	0	0	0	0	0	0	0	0	

First match(es) will be played: TBD. Source: PFA
Rules for classification: Tiebreakers

===== Group 9 =====
Pos	Team	Pld	W	D	L	GF	GA	GD	Pts	Qualification
1	Deir Jarir	0	0	0	0	0	0	0	0	Advance to the second round
2	Shuqba	0	0	0	0	0	0	0	0	Advance to the second round
3	Kharbatha Bani Harith	0	0	0	0	0	0	0	0	
4	Deir Ammar	0	0	0	0	0	0	0	0	

First match(es) will be played: TBD. Source: PFA
Rules for classification: Tiebreakers

===== Group 10 =====
Pos	Team	Pld	W	D	L	GF	GA	GD	Pts	Qualification
1	Thaqafi al-Bireh	0	0	0	0	0	0	0	0	Advance to the second round
2	Kafr Ein	0	0	0	0	0	0	0	0	Advance to the second round
3	Sinjil	0	0	0	0	0	0	0	0	
4	Kharbatha al-Misbah	0	0	0	0	0	0	0	0	

First match(es) will be played: TBD. Source: PFA
Rules for classification: Tiebreakers

===== Group 11 =====
Pos	Team	Pld	W	D	L	GF	GA	GD	Pts	Qualification
1	Kobar	0	0	0	0	0	0	0	0	Advance to the second round
2	Shabtin	0	0	0	0	0	0	0	0	Advance to the second round
3	al-Janiya	0	0	0	0	0	0	0	0	
4	Bil‘in	0	0	0	0	0	0	0	0	

First match(es) will be played: TBD. Source: PFA
Rules for classification: Tiebreakers

=== Southern Governorates ===
==== Gaza and North Branch ====
===== Group 1 =====
Pos	Team	Pld	W	D	L	GF	GA	GD	Pts	Qualification
1	al-Shuja‘iya	0	0	0	0	0	0	0	0	Advance to the second round
2	Gaza Sports Club	0	0	0	0	0	0	0	0	Advance to the second round
3	Ahli Beit Hanoun	0	0	0	0	0	0	0	0	
4	Hittin	0	0	0	0	0	0	0	0	

First match(es) will be played: TBD. Source: PFA
Rules for classification: Tiebreakers

===== Group 2 =====
Pos	Team	Pld	W	D	L	GF	GA	GD	Pts	Qualification
1	Shabab Jabalia	0	0	0	0	0	0	0	0	Advance to the second round
2	Beit Hanoun Sports Club	0	0	0	0	0	0	0	0	Advance to the second round
3	al-Mashtal	0	0	0	0	0	0	0	0	
4	Falasteen	0	0	0	0	0	0	0	0	

First match(es) will be played: TBD. Source: PFA
Rules for classification: Tiebreakers

===== Group 3 =====
Pos	Team	Pld	W	D	L	GF	GA	GD	Pts	Qualification
1	al-Sadaqa	0	0	0	0	0	0	0	0	Advance to the second round
2	Namaa	0	0	0	0	0	0	0	0	Advance to the second round
3	al-Shams	0	0	0	0	0	0	0	0	
4	al-Tuffah	0	0	0	0	0	0	0	0	

First match(es) will be played: TBD. Source: PFA
Rules for classification: Tiebreakers

===== Group 4 =====
Pos	Team	Pld	W	D	L	GF	GA	GD	Pts	Qualification
1	al-Ahli	0	0	0	0	0	0	0	0	Advance to the second round
2	Beit Lahia	0	0	0	0	0	0	0	0	Advance to the second round
3	al-Salam	0	0	0	0	0	0	0	0	
4	al-Jalaa	0	0	0	0	0	0	0	0	

First match(es) will be played: TBD. Source: PFA
Rules for classification: Tiebreakers

===== Group 5 =====
Pos	Team	Pld	W	D	L	GF	GA	GD	Pts	Qualification
1	al-Hilal	0	0	0	0	0	0	0	0	Advance to the second round
2	Khadamat Jabalia	0	0	0	0	0	0	0	0	Advance to the second round
3	Shabab al-Zaytoun	0	0	0	0	0	0	0	0	
4	al-Wifaq	0	0	0	0	0	0	0	0	

First match(es) will be played: TBD. Source: PFA
Rules for classification: Tiebreakers

===== Group 6 =====
Pos	Team	Pld	W	D	L	GF	GA	GD	Pts	Qualification
1	al-Shati	0	0	0	0	0	0	0	0	Advance to the second round
2	al-Mujamma‘ al-Islami	0	0	0	0	0	0	0	0	Advance to the second round
3	al-Ridwan	0	0	0	0	0	0	0	0	
4	al-Zaytoun	0	0	0	0	0	0	0	0	

First match(es) will be played: TBD. Source: PFA
Rules for classification: Tiebreakers

==== Central and Southern Branch ====
===== Group 1 =====
Pos	Team	Pld	W	D	L	GF	GA	GD	Pts	Qualification
1	Ittihad Khan Younis	0	0	0	0	0	0	0	0	Advance to the second round
2	Khadamat Khan Younis	0	0	0	0	0	0	0	0	Advance to the second round
3	al-Masdar	0	0	0	0	0	0	0	0	
4	al-Salah	0	0	0	0	0	0	0	0	
5	Shabab Ma‘n	0	0	0	0	0	0	0	0	

First match(es) will be played: TBD. Source: PFA
Rules for classification: Tiebreakers

===== Group 2 =====
Pos	Team	Pld	W	D	L	GF	GA	GD	Pts	Qualification
1	Shabab Khan Younis	0	0	0	0	0	0	0	0	Advance to the second round
2	al-Amal	0	0	0	0	0	0	0	0	Advance to the second round
3	al-Istiqlal	0	0	0	0	0	0	0	0	
4	al-Ribat	0	0	0	0	0	0	0	0	
5	al-Tarabut	0	0	0	0	0	0	0	0	

First match(es) will be played: TBD. Source: PFA
Rules for classification: Tiebreakers

===== Group 3 =====
Pos	Team	Pld	W	D	L	GF	GA	GD	Pts	Qualification
1	Khadamat Rafah	0	0	0	0	0	0	0	0	Advance to the second round
2	Khadamat al-Bureij	0	0	0	0	0	0	0	0	Advance to the second round
3	Khadamat al-Maghazi	0	0	0	0	0	0	0	0	
4	Shabab al-Maghazi	0	0	0	0	0	0	0	0	

First match(es) will be played: TBD. Source: PFA
Rules for classification: Tiebreakers

===== Group 4 =====
Pos	Team	Pld	W	D	L	GF	GA	GD	Pts	Qualification
1	Shabab Rafah	0	0	0	0	0	0	0	0	Advance to the second round
2	Khadamat al-Nuseirat	0	0	0	0	0	0	0	0	Advance to the second round
3	Ahli al-Bureij	0	0	0	0	0	0	0	0	
4	Khadamat Deir al-Balah	0	0	0	0	0	0	0	0	

First match(es) will be played: TBD. Source: PFA
Rules for classification: Tiebreakers

===== Group 5 =====
Pos	Team	Pld	W	D	L	GF	GA	GD	Pts	Qualification
1	Shabab al-Zawayda	0	0	0	0	0	0	0	0	Advance to the second round
2	Ittihad Deir al-Balah	0	0	0	0	0	0	0	0	Advance to the second round
3	Al-Ataa	0	0	0	0	0	0	0	0	
4	al-Qadisiya	0	0	0	0	0	0	0	0	

First match(es) will be played: TBD. Source: PFA
Rules for classification: Tiebreakers

===== Group 6 =====
Pos	Team	Pld	W	D	L	GF	GA	GD	Pts	Qualification
1	Ahli al-Nuseirat	0	0	0	0	0	0	0	0	Advance to the second round
2	al-Shawka	0	0	0	0	0	0	0	0	Advance to the second round
3	al-Aqsa	0	0	0	0	0	0	0	0	
4	Jama‘i Rafah	0	0	0	0	0	0	0	0	

First match(es) will be played: TBD. Source: PFA
Rules for classification: Tiebreakers

=== Diaspora ===
==== Group A ====
Pos	Team	Pld	W	D	L	GF	GA	GD	Pts	Qualification
1	Al-Diffa Club (A)	2	2	0	0	3	1	+2	6	Advance to the second round
2	Al-Wahda Club	1	0	0	1	1	2	−1	0	Advance to the second round
3	Al-Somoud Club	1	0	0	1	0	1	−1	0	

Updated to match(es) played on 4 Oct 2026. Source: PFA
Rules for classification: Tiebreakers
(A) Advance to a further round

==== Group B ====
Pos	Team	Pld	W	D	L	GF	GA	GD	Pts	Qualification
1	Al-Ajyal Club	1	0	1	0	2	2	0	1	Advance to the second round
2	Al-Yarmouk Club	1	0	1	0	2	2	0	1	Advance to the second round
3	Al-Nojoom Club	0	0	0	0	0	0	0	0	
4	Bayt Al-Maqdis Club	0	0	0	0	0	0	0	0	

Updated to match(es) played on 21 September 2026. Source: PFA
Rules for classification: Tiebreakers

==== Group C ====
Pos	Team	Pld	W	D	L	GF	GA	GD	Pts	Qualification
1	Al-Tanmiya Club	0	0	0	0	0	0	0	0	Advance to the second round
2	Al-Quds Club	0	0	0	0	0	0	0	0	Advance to the second round
3	Al-Nasr Club	0	0	0	0	0	0	0	0	
4	Al-Ahli Club	0	0	0	0	0	0	0	0	

First match(es) will be played: TBD. Source: PFA
Rules for classification: Tiebreakers

==== Group D ====
Pos	Team	Pld	W	D	L	GF	GA	GD	Pts	Qualification
1	Al-Awda Club	0	0	0	0	0	0	0	0	Advance to the second round
2	Al-Khalil Club	0	0	0	0	0	0	0	0	Advance to the second round
3	Al-Khalisa Club	0	0	0	0	0	0	0	0	
4	Al-Nasirah Club	0	0	0	0	0	0	0	0	

First match(es) will be played: TBD. Source: PFA
Rules for classification: Tiebreakers

==== Sidon Group ====
Pos	Team	Pld	W	D	L	GF	GA	GD	Pts	Qualification
1	Al-Nahda Sidon	0	0	0	0	0	0	0	0	Advance to the second round
2	Al-Nahawand	0	0	0	0	0	0	0	0	Advance to the second round
3	Al-Ansar	0	0	0	0	0	0	0	0	
4	Al-Nasira Sidon	0	0	0	0	0	0	0	0	
5	Al-Okhowa	0	0	0	0	0	0	0	0	
6	Filastin Tajma'una	0	0	0	0	0	0	0	0	

First match(es) will be played: 18 September 2026. Source: PFA
Rules for classification: Tiebreakers

18 September 2026 1	Al-Nahda Sidon	v	Al-Nahawand
17:00

==== Tyre Group ====
Pos	Team	Pld	W	D	L	GF	GA	GD	Pts	Qualification
1	Al-Nahda Tyre	2	1	1	0	5	3	+2	4	Advance to the second round
2	Al-Ikha'a	2	1	0	1	6	5	+1	3	Advance to the second round
3	Akka	2	1	0	1	7	7	0	3	
4	Al-Olimbi	2	1	0	1	7	8	−1	3	
5	Jineen	1	0	1	0	2	2	0	1	
6	Al-Nasr Tyre	1	0	0	1	1	3	−2	0	

Updated to match(es) played on 4 Oct 2026. Source: PFA
Rules for classification: Tiebreakers
