= Palestine national football team results (unofficial matches) =

This is a list of the Palestine national football team results from 1953 to the present day that, for various reasons, are not accorded the status of official International A Matches.

== Results ==
=== 1930s ===
1931 Friendly	AUB XI (Lebanon)	?–?	(Palestine) APSF XI	Beirut, Lebanon

=== 1950s ===
1 August 1953 1953 Pan Arab Games	Egypt	8–1	Palestine	Alexandria, Egypt
	Qadoura 10'; Sharif El-Far 25'; Ad-Diba 34', 37', 42', 60'; El-Dhizui 50', 80'		Farah 17'	Stadium: Alexandria Stadium

3 August 1953 1953 Pan Arab Games	Libya	5–2	Palestine	Alexandria, Egypt
	Al-Ghannai 12', 31'; Al-Zantouni 40'; Al-Yamani 43'; Al-Houni 78'		El-Sharfa 45' (?)	Stadium: Alexandria Stadium

=== 1960s ===
2 September 1965 1965 Pan Arab Games	Palestine	1–0	(Aden Colony) Aden	Cairo, United Arab Republic

3 September 1965 1965 Pan Arab Games	Palestine	1–0	Lebanon	Cairo, United Arab Republic

6 September 1965 1965 Pan Arab Games	United Arab Republic	2–1	Palestine	Cairo, United Arab Republic

7 September 1965 1965 Pan Arab Games	Palestine	1–1	Iraq	Cairo, United Arab Republic

9 September 1965 1965 Pan Arab Games	Sudan	2–1	Palestine	Cairo, United Arab Republic

10 September 1965 1965 Pan Arab Games	Libya	4–2	Palestine	Cairo, United Arab Republic

2 April 1966 1966 Arab Nations Cup	Libya	0–0	Palestine	Baghdad, Iraq
				Stadium: Al-Kashafa Stadium

4 April 1966 1966 Arab Nations Cup	Palestine	7–0	North Yemen	Baghdad, Iraq
				Stadium: Al-Kashafa Stadium

6 April 1966 1966 Arab Nations Cup	Syria	3–1	Palestine	Baghdad, Iraq
				Stadium: Al-Kashafa Stadium

=== 1970s ===
8 October 1976 1976 Pan Arab Games	Morocco	3–0	Palestine	Damascus, Syria

12 October 1976 1976 Pan Arab Games	Saudi Arabia	3–1	Palestine	Damascus, Syria
				Stadium: Abbasiyyin Stadium

14 October 1976 1976 Pan Arab Games	Palestine	2–1	Jordan	Damascus, Syria
	Goal		Mostafa

16 October 1976 1976 Pan Arab Games	Syria	2–0	Palestine	Damascus, Syria
				Stadium: Abbasiyyin Stadium

18 October 1976 1976 Pan Arab Games	South Yemen	0–0	Palestine	Damascus, Syria

20 October 1976 1976 Pan Arab Games	Palestine	1–0	Mauritania	Damascus, Syria

=== 1990s ===
11 September 1992 1992 Arab Cup	Syria	0–0	Palestine	Aleppo, Syria
				Stadium: Al-Hamadaniah Stadium

13 September 1992 1992 Arab Cup	Saudi Arabia	2–1	Palestine	Aleppo, Syria
	Al-Bishi 54'; Al-Owairan 57'		Goal	Stadium: Al-Hamadaniah Stadium

7 June 1997 Non-FIFA friendly	Palestine	0–0	Jordan	Jericho, Palestine

20 August 1999 1999 Pan Arab Games	Qatar	0–1	Palestine	Jordan

=== 2000s ===
2000 Non-FIFA friendly	Palestine	1–2	(Egypt) Zamalek	Gaza, Palestine
			Ali; Bassiouny	Stadium: Palestine Stadium

6 October 2001 Non-FIFA friendly	Nejmeh (Lebanon)	2–0	Palestine	Lebanon

30 November 2002 Copa de la Hermandad	Palestino (Chile)	0–3	Palestine	Santiago, Chile
			Al-Kord 29', 44'; Salem 40'	Stadium: Estadio Municipal de La Cisterna

10 December 2002 Non-FIFA friendly	Chile U20	3–1	Palestine	Santiago, Chile
				Stadium: Estadio Nacional Julio Martínez Prádanos

20 December 2002 2002 Arab Nations Cup	Morocco U23	3–1	Palestine	Kuwait City, Kuwait
				Stadium: Al Kuwait Sports Club Stadium; Attendance: 700; Referee: Mohamed Omar (United Arab Emirates)

6 May 2009 Non-FIFA friendly	FC Brussels (Belgium)	4–3	Palestine	Belgium
19:30	Culek 29', 61', 76'; Coppin 46'		Abu-Sidu 47', 85'; Lafi 65'

6 June 2009 Non-FIFA friendly	Palestine	2–2	Chechnya	Al-Ram, Palestine

5 October 2009 Non-FIFA friendly	Chechnya	Cancelled	Palestine	Chechnya

=== 2010s ===
23 January 2010 Non-FIFA friendly	Palestine	1–1	(Russia) Dinamo Moscow	Palestine
17:20	Abdel Jawad 54' (pen.); Abdala (red card) 71'		Dimidko 56'

1 March 2011 Non-FIFA friendly	Pakistan U23	1–2	Palestine	Lahore, Pakistan
	Tauseef 38'		Abu Bilal 24'; Wadi 30'	Stadium: Punjab Stadium

4 March 2011 Non-FIFA friendly	Pakistan U23	0–0	Palestine	Karachi, Pakistan
				Stadium: Peoples Football Stadium

11 November 2011 Non-FIFA friendly	Palestine	1–1	South Africa B	Hebron, Palestine
15:35	Al-Amour 9'		81'	Stadium: Dora International Stadium

15 November 2011 Non-FIFA friendly	Palestine	1–1	South Africa B	Nablus, Palestine
15:35	Keshkesh 47'		Tshapango 24'	Stadium: Municipal Stadium

29 February 2012 Non-FIFA friendly	Palestine	2–0	Azerbaijan	Dubai, United Arab Emirates
				Stadium: The Sevens Stadium

14 May 2012 2012 Palestine International Cup	Palestine	2–0	Vietnam U19	Palestine

18 May 2012 2012 Palestine International Cup	Palestine	2–2	Pakistan U22	Palestine

22 May 2012 2012 Palestine International Cup	Palestine	2–1	Indonesia	Palestine

24 May 2012 2012 Palestine International Cup	Tunisia U20	0–0 (a.e.t.) (3–4 p)	Palestine	Hebron, Palestine
15:30				Stadium: Dora International Stadium; Attendance: 15,000

26 March 2013 Non-FIFA friendly	Malaysia	0–2	Palestine	Kuantan, Malaysia
				Stadium: Darul Makmur Stadium

6 August 2013 Friendly	Jordan	4–1	Palestine	Amman, Jordan

28 December 2013 Non-FIFA friendly	Palestine	0–0	Saudi Arabia U22	Doha, Qatar
				Stadium: Abdullah bin Khalifa Stadium

20 April 2014 Non-FIFA friendly	Al-Wakrah (Qatar)	0–2	Palestine	Al Wakrah, Qatar
			Maraaba 32'; Seyam 52'	Stadium: Saoud bin Abdulrahman Stadium

22 April 2014 Non-FIFA friendly	Al-Imdad (Qatar)	1–3	Palestine	Doha, Qatar
	50'		Al Masalmeh; Musa 85'; Seyam 90'

17 February 2016 Non-FIFA friendly	Algeria U23	0–1	Palestine	Algiers, Algeria
			Abu Nahyeh 62'	Stadium: Stade du 5 Juillet; Attendance: 75,000

14 November 2016 Non-FIFA friendly	Morocco B	0–0	Palestine	Rabat, Morocco
19:00				Stadium: Prince Moulay Abdellah Stadium

13 December 2016 Non-FIFA friendly	Palestine	3–0	(Chile) Palestino	Nablus, Palestine
	Abu Nahyeh 33'; Nu'man 38'; Yameen 43'			Stadium: Municipal Stadium

August 2017 Non-FIFA friendly	Bangor (Indonesia)	0–4	Palestine	Indonesia

31 December 2018 Non-FIFA friendly	Kyrgyzstan	2–1	Palestine	Dubai, Qatar
	Israilov 39'; Bernhardt 69'	Report	Maraaba 73'	Stadium: Suheim bin Hamad Stadium; Referee: Saoud Ali Al Adba (Qatar)
