= Suleiman Obeid =

Palestinian footballer (1984–2025)

- Obeid playing for Khadamat Al-Shatea

Personal information
- Full name: Suleiman Ahmed Zaid Obeid
- Date of birth: 24 March 1984
- Place of birth: Gaza City, Gaza Strip, Israeli Civil Administration
- Date of death: 6 August 2025 (aged 41)
- Place of death: Gaza Strip, Palestine
- Height: 1.75 m (5 ft 9 in)
- Positions: Forward; right winger

Youth career
- 2005–2006: Khadamat Al-Shatea

Senior career*
Years	Team	Apps	(Gls)
2007–2009	Khadamat Al-Shatea		(13)
2009–2013	Markaz Shabab Al-Am'ari		(40)
2013–2014	Khadamat Al-Shatea		(7)
2014–2016	Gaza Sport		(29)
2016–2023	Khadamat Al-Shatea		(62)
Total			(151)

International career
2007–2013	Palestine	24	(2)
- * Club domestic league appearances and goals

Suleiman Ahmed Zaid Obeid, also spelled Sulaiman Al-Obaid (Arabic: سليمان العبيد; 24 March 1984 – 6 August 2025), was a Palestinian international footballer who played as a forward and winger in the Gaza Strip Premier League and one season in the Gaza Strip First Division. Obeid was also known as the "Palestinian Pelé", after the Brazilian footballer.

== Club career ==
Suleiman Obeid spent his entire career playing in the Gaza Strip, and he joined the academy of Khadamat Al-Shatea in 2005. He then debuted for the senior team in 2007. He left in 2009 to join Markaz Shabab Al-Am'ari where he won the 2010–11 Gaza Strip Premier League title and was a runner-up in the 2012 AFC President's Cup; he scored twice in the competition on 28 September 2012 during the 5–1 victory against Khan Research Laboratories in the second group stage.

He rejoined Khadamat Al-Shatea during the 2013–14 season before joining Gaza Sport ahead of the 2014–15 season. He scored 29 goals for Gaza Sport before he joined Khadamat Al-Shatea again in 2016.

Obeid was the Gaza Strip Premier League top scorer during the 2016–17 season with fifteen goals. He finished as a league runner-up during 2019–20 and stayed with the club as they were relegated to the Gaza Strip First Division in June 2022. He was part of the team which won promotion back to the Gaza Strip Premier League after finishing as runners-up in the 2022–23 Gaza Strip First Division, and he retired after club football was suspended in Palestine on 7 October 2023 due to the Gaza war; in his final season, he played all six matches of the shortened 2023–24 Palestine Professional League.

Across his club career, Obeid scored 151 league goals. (Note: National Football Teams has currently verified 89 of his 151 club goals.)

== International career ==
Obeid debuted for Palestine on 18 June 2007 during the 1–0 loss against Iraq at the 2007 WAFF Championship, and he scored his first international goal on 27 September 2010 during the 2–1 loss against Yemen at the 2010 WAFF Championship.

He also represented Palestine during the 2012 AFC Challenge Cup qualification and the 2014 World Cup qualifying.

== Death ==
On 6 August 2025, Obeid was shot and killed by Israeli forces in Gaza while waiting for humanitarian aid alongside other civilians, according to the Palestinian Football Association. He was survived by his wife and five children.

== Career statistics ==
=== Club ===
Only league statistics are known.

Appearances and goals by club, season and competition
Club	Season	League		
Club	Season	Division	Apps	Goals
Khadamat Al-Shatea	2005–06	Gaza Strip Premier League	0	0
Khadamat Al-Shatea	2006–07	Gaza Strip Premier League	0	0
Khadamat Al-Shatea	2007–08	Gaza Strip Premier League		5
Khadamat Al-Shatea	2008–09	Gaza Strip Premier League		8
Markaz Shabab Al-Am'ari	2009–10	Gaza Strip Premier League		10
Markaz Shabab Al-Am'ari	2010–11	Gaza Strip Premier League		11
Markaz Shabab Al-Am'ari	2011–12	Gaza Strip Premier League		9
Markaz Shabab Al-Am'ari	2012–13	Gaza Strip Premier League		10
Khadamat Al-Shatea	2013–14	Gaza Strip Premier League		7
Gaza Sport	2014–15	Gaza Strip Premier League		12
Gaza Sport	2015–16	Gaza Strip Premier League		17
Khadamat Al-Shatea	2016–17	Gaza Strip Premier League		15
Khadamat Al-Shatea	2017–18	Gaza Strip Premier League		12
Khadamat Al-Shatea	2018–19	Gaza Strip Premier League		7
Khadamat Al-Shatea	2019–20	Gaza Strip Premier League		6
Khadamat Al-Shatea	2020–21	Gaza Strip Premier League		11
Khadamat Al-Shatea	2021–22	Gaza Strip Premier League		5
Khadamat Al-Shatea	2022–23	Gaza Strip First Division		2
Khadamat Al-Shatea	2023–24	Palestine Professional League	6	4
Career total			6+	151

=== International ===
Appearances and goals by national team and year
National team	Year	Apps	Goals
Palestine	2007	1	0
Palestine	2008	0	0
Palestine	2009	1	0
Palestine	2010	3	1
Palestine	2011	15	1
Palestine	2012	0	0
Palestine	2013	4	0
Total		24	2

Scores and results list Palestine's goal tally first, score column indicates score after each Obeid goal.

List of international goals scored by Suleiman Obeid
No.	Date	Venue	Cap	Opponent	Score	Result	Competition	Ref.
1	27 September 2010	Amman International Stadium, Amman, Jordan	4	Yemen	1–2	1–3	2010 WAFF Championship	
2	22 August 2011	Manahan Stadium, Surakarta, Indonesia	14	Indonesia	1–0	1–4	Friendly	

== Honours ==
Khadamat Al-Shatea

- Gaza Strip Premier League: runner-up 2019–20; third place 2009–10
- Gaza Strip First Division: runner-up 2022–23

Markaz Shabab Al-Am'ari

- Gaza Strip Premier League: 2010–11
- AFC President's Cup runners-up: 2012

Individual

- Gaza Strip Premier League top scorer: 2016–17

== See also ==
- 2025 Gaza Strip aid distribution killings
- Palestinian sports during the Israeli invasion of the Gaza Strip
- Mohammed Barakat (footballer)
