= 2012 Palestine International Cup =

2012 Nakba Cup
Tournament details
- Host country: Palestine
- Dates: 14–24 May 2012
- Teams: 10 (from 2 confederations)
- Venues: 5 (in 4 host cities)

Final positions
- Champions: Palestine (1st title)
- Runners-up: Tunisia

Tournament statistics
- Matches played: 12
- Goals scored: 25 (2.08 per match)

The 2012 Palestine International Cup also 2012 Al Nakba Cup (Arabic: بطولة فلسطين الدولية 2012) was a friendly international football tournament hosted by Palestine. National teams from Asia and Africa have been invited with many sending youth sides in preparation for upcoming youth tournaments.

Uzbekistan were drawn into Group B but withdrew before the first matchday which then meant that Sri Lanka were moved from Group A to Group C and Mauritania moved from Group C to Group B.

== Participating nations ==
Africa

- Mauritania
- Tunisia U22

Asia

- Kurdistan Region
- Indonesia
- Jordan U22
- Pakistan U22
- Palestine
- Sri Lanka
- Uzbekistan (withdrew)
- Vietnam U19

== Venues ==
Nablus	Al-Ram	Al-Bireh	Hebron	Hebron
Nablus Football Stadium	Faisal Al-Husseini International Stadium	Majed Asad Stadium	Dora International Stadium	Hussein Bin Ali Stadium
Capacity: 30,000	Capacity: 12,500	Capacity: 15,000	Capacity: 20,000	Capacity: 6,000

== Group stage ==
All times are local (UTC+2).

=== Group A ===
Team	Pld	W	D	L	GF	GA	GD	Pts
Palestine	2	1	1	0	4	2	+2	4
Pakistan U22	2	0	2	0	2	2	0	2
Vietnam U19	2	0	1	1	0	2	−2	1

14 May 2012
17:00

Palestine	2–0	Vietnam U19
Al-Halman 25'; Attal 74'	Report

Faisal Al-Husseini International Stadium, Al-Ram

16 May 2012
17:00

Pakistan U22	0–0	Vietnam U19

Majed Asad Stadium, Al-Bireh

18 May 2012
19:30

Palestine	2–2	Pakistan U22
Al-Halman 23', 56'		Adil 54'; Iqbal 84'

Dora International Stadium, Hebron

=== Group B ===
Team	Pld	W	D	L	GF	GA	GD	Pts
Kurdistan Region	2	1	1	0	4	2	+2	4
Indonesia	2	1	1	0	3	1	+2	4
Mauritania	2	0	0	2	1	5	−4	0

15 May 2012
17:00

Kurdistan Region	3–1	Mauritania
Abdullah 2', 40'; Shiraz 55'		Da Silva 75'

Hussein Bin Ali Stadium, Hebron

17 May 2012
17:00

Mauritania	0–2	Indonesia
	Report	Hendra Bayauw 19'; Fall 24' (o.g.)

Nablus Football Stadium, Nablus

19 May 2012
18:00

Indonesia	1–1	Kurdistan Region

Dora International Stadium, Hebron

=== Group C ===
Team	Pld	W	D	L	GF	GA	GD	Pts
Tunisia U22	2	2	0	0	3	0	+3	6
Jordan U22	2	1	0	1	2	2	0	3
Sri Lanka	2	0	0	2	0	3	−3	0

16 May 2012
17:00

Tunisia U22	2–0	Jordan U22
Alaa Ben Said 40', 89'	Report

Faisal Al-Husseini International Stadium, Al-Ram

18 May 2012
17:00

Jordan U22	2–0	Sri Lanka
Abu Amarah 40'; Al-Laham 47' (pen.)	Report

Faisal Al-Husseini International Stadium, Al-Ram

20 May 2012
17:00

Tunisia U22	1–0	Sri Lanka

Nablus Football Stadium, Nablus

=== Ranking of second-placed teams ===
Team	Pld	W	D	L	GF	GA	GD	Pts
Indonesia	2	1	1	0	3	1	+2	4
Jordan U22	2	1	0	1	2	2	0	3
Pakistan U22	2	0	2	0	2	2	0	2

== Knockout stage ==
=== Semi-finals ===
22 May 2012
17:00

Kurdistan Region	1–2	Tunisia U22

Faisal Al-Husseini International Stadium, Al-Ram

22 May 2012
19:00

Palestine	2–1	Indonesia
	Report

Hussein Bin Ali Stadium, Hebron

=== Final ===
24 May 2012
15:30

Tunisia U22	0–0 (a.e.t.)	Palestine
	Report
Penalties
	3–4

Dora International Stadium, Hebron
Attendance: 15,000

== Goalscorers ==
3 goals

- (Kurdistan Region) Krzan Wamang Abdullah
- (Palestine) Khaldoun Al-Halman

2 goals

- (Palestine) Fahed Attal
- (Tunisia) Alaa Ben Said

1 goal

- (Indonesia) Hendra Bayauw
- (Indonesia) Titus Bonai
- (Indonesia) Irfan Bachdim
- (Jordan) Munther Abu Amarah
- (Jordan) Mossab Al-Laham
- (Pakistan) Faisal Iqbal
- (Pakistan) Muhammad Adil
- (Palestine) Hussam Abu Saleh
- (Kurdistan Region) Barzan Shiraz
- (Mauritania) Dominique Da Silva

1 own goal

- (Mauritania) Yacoub Fall (For Indonesia)

== Final ranking ==
1. Palestine
2. Tunisia U22
3. Kurdistan Region
4. Indonesia
5. Jordan U22
6. Pakistan U22
7. Vietnam U19
8. Sri Lanka
9. Mauritania
