= Football in Palestine =

- Country: Palestine
- Governing body: Palestinian Football Association (PFA) (formed in 1948, joined FIFA in 1998)
- National team: Palestine
- Nicknames: أسود كنعان (Lions of Canaan) الفدائيون (The Fedayeen) الفرسان (The Knights)
- First played: 1950s
- Clubs: See list of clubs

Club competitions
- Gaza Strip Premier League; West Bank Premier League; Gaza Strip First League; West Bank First League; Gaza Strip Second League; West Bank Second League; West Bank Third League; Palestine Women's League; Palestine Cup; Yasser Arafat Cup; Gaza Strip Super Cup

International competitions
- List: National team; AFC Asian Cup: Group stage (2015 & 2019); WAFF Championship (National Team): Group stage; AFC Challenge Cup (National Team): Champions in 2014; Arab Nations Cup (National Team): Group stage; National U-23 team; AFC U-23 Championship (2018): Quarter-final; Women's national team; WAFF Women's Championship (2014): Runners-up

The sport of football in Palestine is run by the Palestinian Football Association. The association administers national teams and club competitions. They are members of FIFA and the Asian Football Confederation. Women's football is popular also in Palestine. The opening match of the Palestine Women's National Football League on February 10, 2011, in the Feisal al-Husseini Stadium was attended by an estimated 8,000 people. The Women's league has six teams. Football is the most popular sport in Palestine. Honey Thaljieh is a pioneer in women's football.

== History ==
The game was originally introduced during the time of the British Mandate. Palestine has one of the oldest histories of organized football in the Middle East with evidence of the game being played at an organized level amongst Palestinian youths since at least the early 1920s. Some notable clubs during the early years of Palestinian football were Shabab Al Arab of Haifa, the Orthodox Club of Jerusalem, and Islami Yaffa. During these years, Palestinian stars, such as Jabra Al-Zarqa, George Mardeni, and Majed Assad represented an excellence that was second to none. Jabra Al-Zarqa received an offer to play for Arsenal FC while playing in the British Army's Haifa League in 1945.

The Eretz Israel Football Association was formed in 1928 and joined FIFA in 1929. It is associated with the Israeli Football Association. At the time the association was made up of Arab clubs, Jewish clubs and clubs representing British policemen and soldiers serving in the region during the British Mandate rule that spanned the period between World War One and the independence of the state of Israel in 1948. The qualification matches for the 1934 and 1938 World Cups were contested by a Mandatory Palestine national football team made up exclusively of Jewish players.

Palestine applied to, and was admitted into FIFA in 1998. They played their first friendly matches against Lebanon, Jordan and Syria in July 1998. The following year, the team, led by Palestinian-Israeli coach Azmi Nasser took part in the 1999 Pan Arab Games, in which they won the bronze medal after beating Syria, Qatar, and the United Arab Emirates, while only losing to hosts Jordan.

== Football stadiums in Palestine ==
Stadium	Capacity	City	Tenants	Image
Yatta International Stadium	20,000	Yatta, Hebron	Shabab Yatta	
Dura International Stadium	18,000	Dura, Hebron	Shabab Dura	
Hussein Bin Ali Stadium	11,000	Hebron	Ahli Al-Khaleel, Shabab Al-Khalil SC and Shabab Alsamu	
Jericho International Stadium	15,000	Jericho	Hilal Areeha	
Faisal Al-Husseini International Stadium	12,500	Al-Ram	Palestine national football team, Hilal Al-Quds Club	
Palestine Stadium	10,000	Gaza City		

== See also ==
- List of Palestine international footballers
- Football in Israel
- Palestinian football clubs in Asian competitions
