= Palestinian football clubs in Asian competitions =

Palestinian football clubs have participated in Asian football competitions since 1998, when Khidmat Rafah took part in the Asian Club Championship.

== Overall records ==
Competition	Seasons	Games	Wins	Draws	Losses	Goals scored	Goals against	Goal difference
AFC President's Cup/AFC Challenge League	4	16	6	3	7	35	22	+13
Asian Club Championship	2	6	1	1	4	5	19	−14
Asian Cup Winners' Cup	1	2	1	0	1	3	4	−1
AFC Cup	10	50	12	14	24	48	87	−39
Total	17	74	20	18	36	91	132	−41

Last updated: 5 February 2026

=== By country ===
Country	Pld	W	D	L	GF	GA	GD	Win%
Bahrain	8	1	5	2	10	14	−4	12.50
Bhutan	1	1	0	0	7	0	+7	100.00
Cambodia	1	1	0	0	1	0	+1	100.00
Chinese Taipei	1	0	1	0	1	1	+0	0.00
Iraq	6	1	0	5	4	21	−17	16.67
Jordan	8	1	1	6	6	22	−16	12.50
Kuwait	4	0	0	4	4	14	−10	0.00
Kyrgyzstan	2	1	1	0	4	3	+1	50.00
Lebanon	5	2	0	3	5	8	−3	40.00
Myanmar	1	0	0	1	3	4	−1	0.00
Oman	14	6	4	4	17	18	−1	42.86
Pakistan	2	1	0	1	5	3	+2	50.00
Sri Lanka	1	1	0	0	10	0	+10	100.00
Syria	12	0	6	6	3	16	−13	0.00
Tajikistan	4	1	0	3	2	5	−3	25.00
Turkmenistan	2	1	0	1	4	4	+0	50.00
Yemen	2	1	1	0	2	1	+1	50.00

== AFC Cup ==
Year	Round	Palestinian team	Opposing team	Score	Venue
2014	Qualifying play-off	Shabab Al-Dhahiriya	(Kyrgyzstan) Alay Osh	1–1 (7–8 p)	(Palestine) Dora International Stadium, Hebron
2015	Play-off round	Hilal Al-Quds	(Syria) Al-Jaish	0–0 (4–5 p)	(Bahrain) Al Ahli Stadium, Manama
2015	Group stage	Taraji Wadi Al-Nes	(Jordan) Al-Jazeera	1–1	(Palestine) Faisal Al-Husseini International Stadium, Al-Ram
2015	Group stage	Taraji Wadi Al-Nes	(Bahrain) Al-Hidd	1–1	Bahrain National Stadium, Riffa
2015	Group stage	Taraji Wadi Al-Nes	(Iraq) Al-Shorta	2–6	(Qatar) Grand Hamad Stadium, Doha
2015	Group stage	Taraji Wadi Al-Nes	(Iraq) Al-Shorta	1–0	(Palestine) Faisal Al-Husseini International Stadium, Al-Ram
2015	Group stage	Taraji Wadi Al-Nes	(Jordan) Al-Jazeera	0–2	(Jordan) Al-Hassan Stadium, Irbid
2015	Group stage	Taraji Wadi Al-Nes	(Bahrain) Al-Hidd	1–1	(Palestine) Faisal Al-Husseini International Stadium, Al-Ram
2016	Play-off round	Ahli Al-Khaleel	(Tajikistan) Khujand	1–0	(Palestine) Dora International Stadium, Hebron
2016	Group stage	Ahli Al-Khaleel	(Bahrain) Al-Muharraq	1–2	Bahrain National Stadium, Riffa
2016	Group stage	Ahli Al-Khaleel	(Syria) Al-Jaish	0–3 (Note: The Ahli Al-Khaleel v Al-Jaish match was initially postponed due to the Syrians' inability to obtain the necessary entry visas for Jordan. It was required by the AFC to be played on 3 or 4 May 2016 at a neutral venue due to restriction of Syrians entering Palestine. However, Ahli Al-Khaleel were unable to secure a neutral venue and the match was forfeited.)	(Jordan) Prince Mohammed Stadium, Zarqa
2016	Group stage	Ahli Al-Khaleel	(Oman) Fanja	2–1	(Palestine) Dora International Stadium, Hebron
2016	Group stage	Ahli Al-Khaleel	(Oman) Fanja	3–3	(Oman) Al-Seeb Stadium, Seeb
2016	Group stage	Ahli Al-Khaleel	(Bahrain) Al-Muharraq	1–1	(Palestine) Dora International Stadium, Hebron
2016	Group stage	Ahli Al-Khaleel	(Syria) Al-Jaish	0–1	(Bahrain) Khalifa Sports City Stadium, Isa Town
2016	Group stage	Shabab Al-Dhahiriya	(Iraq) Al-Quwa Al-Jawiya	0–2	(Palestine) Dora International Stadium, Hebron
2016	Group stage	Shabab Al-Dhahiriya	(Syria) Al-Wahda	3–0 (Note: The Al-Wahda v Shabab Al-Dhahiriya match on matchday 2 (9 March 2016) was not played as scheduled. It was awarded 3–0 to Al-Wahda by the AFC Disciplinary Committee on 28 April 2016, as it found Shabab Al-Dhahiriya as the relevant party for causing the cancellation of the match. The decision was reversed and awarded 3–0 to Shabab Al-Dhahiriya by the AFC Appeal Committee on 24 June 2016, as it found Al-Wahda as the relevant party for causing the cancellation of the match.)	(Lebanon) Saida Municipal Stadium, Saida
2016	Group stage	Shabab Al-Dhahiriya	(Oman) Al-Orouba	1–1	(Oman) Sur Sports Complex, Sur
2016	Group stage	Shabab Al-Dhahiriya	(Oman) Al-Orouba	2–0	(Palestine) Dora International Stadium, Hebron
2016	Group stage	Shabab Al-Dhahiriya	(Iraq) Al-Quwa Al-Jawiya	1–4	(Qatar) Saoud bin Abdulrahman Stadium, Al Wakrah
2016	Group stage	Shabab Al-Dhahiriya	(Syria) Al-Wahda	0–3 (Note: The Shabab Al-Dhahiriya v Al-Wahda match on matchday 6 (11 May 2016) was not played as scheduled. It was awarded 3–0 to Al-Wahda by the AFC Disciplinary Committee on 13 May 2016, as it found Shabab Al-Dhahiriya as the relevant party for causing the cancellation of the match.)	(Palestine) Dora International Stadium, Hebron
2017	Play-off round	Shabab Al-Khaleel	(Oman) Al-Suwaiq	2–1	(Palestine) Dora International Stadium, Hebron
2017	Play-off round	Shabab Al-Khaleel	(Oman) Al-Suwaiq	1–3	(Oman) Sultan Qaboos Sports Complex, Muscat
2018	Play-off round	Hilal Al-Quds	(Oman) Al-Suwaiq	0–1	(Palestine) Arab American University Stadium, Jenin
2018	Play-off round	Hilal Al-Quds	(Oman) Al-Suwaiq	1–1	(Oman) Al-Seeb Stadium, Seeb
2019	Play-off round	Hilal Al-Quds	(Oman) Al-Nasr	2–1	(Palestine) Faisal Al-Husseini International Stadium, Al-Ram
2019	Play-off round	Hilal Al-Quds	(Oman) Al-Nasr	1–0	(Oman) Salalah Sports Complex, Salalah
2019	Group stage	Hilal Al-Quds	(Syria) Al-Jaish	1–1	(Bahrain) Al Muharraq Stadium, Arad
2019	Group stage	Hilal Al-Quds	(Jordan) Al-Wehdat	2–6	(Palestine) Faisal Al-Husseini International Stadium, Al-Ram
2019	Group stage	Hilal Al-Quds	(Syria) Al-Jaish	0–0	(Saudi Arabia) King Abdullah Sports City, Jeddah
2019	Group stage	Hilal Al-Quds	(Lebanon) Nejmeh	2–1	(Saudi Arabia) King Abdullah Sports City, Jeddah
2019	Group stage	Hilal Al-Quds	(Lebanon) Nejmeh	2–1	(Saudi Arabia) King Abdullah Sports City, Jeddah
2019	Group stage	Hilal Al-Quds	(Jordan) Al-Wehdat	0–2	(Jordan) King Abdullah II Stadium, Amman
2020	Play-off round	Hilal Al-Quds	(Oman) Sur	2–0	(Palestine) Faisal Al-Husseini International Stadium, Al-Ram
2020	Play-off round	Hilal Al-Quds	(Oman) Sur	0–0	(Oman) Al-Seeb Stadium, Seeb
2020	Group stage	Hilal Al-Quds	(Lebanon) Al-Ahed	1–2	(Lebanon) Camille Chamoun Sports City Stadium, Beirut
2020	Group stage	Hilal Al-Quds	(Syria) Al-Jaish	0–1	(Jordan) King Abdullah II Stadium, Amman
2021	Group stage	Markaz Balata	(Lebanon) Al-Ansar	0–2	(Jordan) King Abdullah II Stadium, Amman
2021	Group stage	Markaz Balata	(Bahrain) Al-Muharraq	3–2	(Jordan) King Abdullah II Stadium, Amman
2021	Group stage	Markaz Balata	(Jordan) Al-Salt	0–5	(Jordan) King Abdullah II Stadium, Amman
2021	Group stage	Markaz Shabab Al-Am'ari	(Jordan) Al-Faisaly	0–2	(Jordan) Amman International Stadium, Amman
2021	Group stage	Markaz Shabab Al-Am'ari	Kuwait SC	1–4	(Jordan) Amman International Stadium, Amman
2021	Group stage	Markaz Shabab Al-Am'ari	(Syria) Tishreen	1–5	(Jordan) Amman International Stadium, Amman
2022	Group stage	Shabab Al-Khaleel	(Oman) Dhofar	0–3	Al Kuwait Sports Club Stadium, Kuwait City
2022	Group stage	Shabab Al-Khaleel	(Kuwait) Al-Arabi	0–1	Al Kuwait Sports Club Stadium, Kuwait City
2022	Group stage	Shabab Al-Khaleel	(Bahrain) Al-Riffa	1–3	Al Kuwait Sports Club Stadium, Kuwait City
2022	Group stage	Hilal Al-Quds	(Syria) Tishreen	0–0	(Bahrain) Al Muharraq Stadium, Arad
2022	Group stage	Hilal Al-Quds	(Lebanon) Nejmeh	0–2	(Bahrain) Al Muharraq Stadium, Arad
2022	Group stage	Hilal Al-Quds	(Bahrain) East Riffa	2–2	(Bahrain) Al Muharraq Stadium, Arad
2023–24	Play-off round	Shabab Al-Khaleel	(Syria) Al-Ittihad	1–2	(Saudi Arabia) King Fahd Sports City, Taif

== AFC President's Cup/AFC Challenge League ==
Year	Round	Palestinian team	Opposing team	Score	Venue
2011	Group stage	Jabal Al-Mukaber	(Tajikistan) Istiqlol	0–2	(Myanmar) Thuwunna Stadium, Yangon
2011	Group stage	Jabal Al-Mukaber	(Myanmar) Yadanarbon	3–4	(Myanmar) Thuwunna Stadium, Yangon
2011	Group stage	Jabal Al-Mukaber	(Bhutan) Yeedzin	7–0	(Myanmar) Bogyoke Aung San Stadium, Yangon
2012	Group stage	Markaz Shabab Al-Am'ari	(Turkmenistan) Balkan	2–1	(Tajikistan) Pamir Stadium, Dushanbe
2012	Group stage	Markaz Shabab Al-Am'ari	(Tajikistan) Istiqlol	0–1	(Tajikistan) Pamir Stadium, Dushanbe
2012	Final stage	Markaz Shabab Al-Am'ari	(Chinese Taipei) Taiwan Power Company	1–1	(Tajikistan) Pamir Stadium, Dushanbe
2012	Final stage	Markaz Shabab Al-Am'ari	(Pakistan) KRL	5–1	(Tajikistan) Pamir Stadium, Dushanbe
2012	Final	Markaz Shabab Al-Am'ari	(Tajikistan) Istiqlol	1–2	(Tajikistan) Pamir Stadium, Dushanbe
2013	Group stage	Hilal Al-Quds	(Turkmenistan) Balkan	2–3	(Cambodia) Olympic Stadium, Phnom Penh
2013	Group stage	Hilal Al-Quds	Sri Lanka Army	10–0	(Cambodia) Olympic Stadium, Phnom Penh
2013	Group stage	Hilal Al-Quds	(Cambodia) Boeung Ket Rubber Field	1–0	(Cambodia) Olympic Stadium, Phnom Penh
2013	Final stage	Hilal Al-Quds	(Kyrgyzstan) Dordoi Bishkek	3–2	(Malaysia) Hang Jebat Stadium, Malacca
2013	Final stage	Hilal Al-Quds	(Pakistan) KRL	0–2	(Malaysia) Hang Jebat Stadium, Malacca
2024–25	Group stage	Hilal Al-Quds	(Bahrain) Al Ahli Club	0–0	(Oman) Al-Seeb Stadium, Seeb
2024–25	Group stage	Hilal Al-Quds	(Syria) Al-Fotuwa	0–0	(Oman) Al-Seeb Stadium, Seeb
2024–25	Group stage	Hilal Al-Quds	(Oman) Al-Seeb	0–3	(Oman) Al-Seeb Stadium, Seeb

== Asian Club Championship ==
Season	Round	Palestinian team	Opposing team	Home Score	Away Score	Aggregate
1998–99	First round	Khidmat Rafah	(Iraq) Al-Quwa Al-Jawiya	0–2	0–7	0–9
2001–02	First round	Hilal Al-Quds	(Yemen) Al-Ahli Sana'a	0–0	2–1	2–1
2001–02	Second round	Hilal Al-Quds	Al-Kuwait	1–6	2–3	3–9

== Asian Cup Winners' Cup ==
Season	Round	Palestinian team	Opposing team	Home Score	Away Score	Aggregate
2000–01	First round	Shja'eya Union	(Jordan) Al-Wehdat	2–1	1–3	3–4
