= Hitteen SC =

- Full name: Hitteen Sporting Club
- Nickname: (Arabic: المارد الأحمر)
- Founded: 1959; 67 years ago
- Ground: stadium of Nablus, Palestine
- Capacity: 5,000
- President: manager = league = West Bank Second League
Home colours

Hitteen Sporting Club (Arabic: نادي حطين الفلسطيني) is a Palestinian football club based in Nablus, Palestine. The club was founded in 1959. It participates in the West Bank Second League. The club uses the stadium of Nablus.

== History ==
Hitteen Sports Club, is one of the oldest Palestinian clubs, based in Nablus. The club was established in 1959 in the city of Nablus. The idea of establishing the Hittin Scouts Club arose from some young men from the city of Nablus, and the Jordanian Scouts and Girl Guides Association proposed a license on October 18, 1959, according to which the Scouting Law is permitted and its division guarantees honesty, sincerity, trust, screen, and discipline. Compassionate, obedience, comfort, patience, courage, as well as public assistance, so that the boy becomes a young man who does his duty towards God.

== Honours ==
=== League ===
- Premier League
  - Runners-up (1) : 1983-84
