= 2024–25 Ismaily SC season =

Ismaily
2024–25 season
- Manager: Hamad Ibrahim
- Stadium: Ismailia Stadium
- Egyptian Premier League: 17th
- Egypt Cup: Round of 16
- Egyptian League Cup: Group stage
- Top goalscorer: League: Marwan Hamdi (4); All: Marwan Hamdi (5)
- All statistics correct as of 16 January 2025.

The 2024–25 season is the 104th season in Ismaily SC's history and the 54th consecutive season in the Premier League. In addition to the domestic league, Ismaily is set to compete in the domestic cup, and the Egyptian League Cup.

== Transfers ==
=== Out ===
Date	Pos.	Player	To	Fee	Ref.
31 August 2024	MF	(Egypt) Omar El Saaiy	(Egypt) Al Ahly	€931,000	
31 August 2024	MF	(Egypt) Abdel Rahman Magdy	(Egypt) Pyramids		
9 September 2024	FW	(Egypt) Basem Morsy	(Egypt) Tala'ea El Gaish	End of contract	
22 September 2024	DF	(Egypt) Essam Sobhy	(Egypt) El Gouna		
2 October 2024	GK	(Egypt) Mohamed Fawzy	(Egypt) Petrojet	End of contract	
17 October 2024	DF	(Tunisia) Hamdi Nagguez		Released	

== Friendlies ==
26 September 2024 Friendly	Ismaily (Egypt)	5–0	(Egypt) Al-Shohada	Ismailia
	Ammar; Hamdi; Al-Nabris			Stadium: Ismailia Stadium

30 September 2024 Friendly	Ismaily (Egypt)	4–0	(Egypt) Porto	Ismailia
	Farag; Al-Nabris; El Kot; (o.g.)	Report		Stadium: Ismailia Stadium

9 October 2024 Friendly	Ismaily (Egypt)	2–1	(Egypt) Tala'ea El Gaish	Ismailia
	Farag; El Malawany	Report	El Sheikh	Stadium: Ismailia Stadium

10 October 2024 Friendly	Ismaily (Egypt)	2–1	(Egypt) Balbis	Ismailia
	Saber; Zidan	Report		Stadium: Ismailia Stadium

13 October 2024 Friendly	Ismaily (Egypt)	0–0	(Egypt) Faqous	Ismailia
				Stadium: Ismailia Stadium

18 October 2024 Friendly	Al Bidda (Qatar)	0–5	(Egypt) Ismaily	Qatar
			Farag 12'; Hamdi 18'; Al-Nabris 25', 47'; Bayoumi 80'

22 October 2024 Friendly	Ittihad Al Doha (Qatar)	1–1	(Egypt) Ismaily	Doha, Qatar
	(pen.)	Report	Abdelaal 63'	Stadium: Doha Science and Technology Stadium

25 October 2024 Friendly	Msheireb (Qatar)	0–1	(Egypt) Ismaily	Qatar
			Al-Nabris

16 November 2024 Friendly	Ismaily (Egypt)	4–1	(Egypt) Fayed	Ismailia
15:00 UTC+2				Stadium: Ismailia Stadium

17 November 2024 Friendly	ZED (Egypt)	0–2	(Egypt) Ismaily	Cairo
15:00 UTC+2		Report	Farag 8'; Hamdi 90' (pen.)	Stadium: Petrosport Stadium

5 December 2024 Friendly	Ismaily (Egypt)	2–1	(Egypt) Shabab Damyetta	Ismailia
	Mohamed 28'; Hamdi 80'			Stadium: Ismailia Stadium

== Competitions ==
=== Overall record ===
Competition	First match	Last match	Starting round	Final position	Record							
Competition	First match	Last match	Starting round	Final position	Pld	W	D	L	GF	GA	GD	Win %
Egyptian Premier League	2 November 2024	30 May 2025	Matchday 1		9	3	3	3	8	6	+2	33.33
Egypt Cup	4 January 2025	16 January 2025	Round of 32	Round of 16	2	1	0	1	1	1	+0	50.00
Egyptian League Cup	11 December 2024		Group stage		1	0	0	1	1	2	−1	0.00
Total					12	4	3	5	10	9	+1	33.33

Last updated: 21 January 2025
Source: Competitions

=== Egyptian Premier League ===
==== League table ====
Pos	Team	Pld	W	D	L	GF	GA	GD	Pts	Qualification or relegation
14	Ghazl El Mahalla	17	5	2	10	16	24	−8	17	Qualification for the relegation play-offs
15	El Gouna	17	4	5	8	10	15	−5	17	Qualification for the relegation play-offs
16	Ismaily	17	3	5	9	11	21	−10	14	Qualification for the relegation play-offs
17	ENPPI	17	2	6	9	10	21	−11	12	Qualification for the relegation play-offs
18	Modern Sport	17	1	6	10	9	24	−15	9	Qualification for the relegation play-offs

Source: Soccerway (regular season)
Rules for classification: 1) Points; 2) Goal difference; 3) Goals scored.

Pos	Team	Pld	W	D	L	GF	GA	GD	Pts	Qualification
1	Al Ahly (C)	8	6	1	1	22	9	+13	58 (Note: Al Ahly were initially deducted three points for refusing to play their away fixture against Zamalek, scheduled to be played on 11 March 2025. The points deduction was later cancelled by the Egyptian Premier League.)	Qualification for the Champions League first or second round
2	Pyramids	8	4	2	2	15	10	+5	56	Qualification for the Champions League first or second round
3	Zamalek	8	4	3	1	14	6	+8	47	Qualification for the Confederation Cup first or second round
4	Al Masry	8	3	3	2	10	9	+1	42	Qualification for the Confederation Cup first or second round
5	National Bank of Egypt SC	8	2	3	3	13	12	+1	38	
6	Ceramica Cleopatra	8	4	1	3	15	12	+3	37	
7	Pharco	8	2	3	3	8	16	−8	32	
8	Petrojet	8	1	2	5	7	17	−10	27	
9	Haras El Hodoud	8	0	2	6	3	16	−13	24	

Source: Soccerway (championship round)
Rules for classification: 1) Points; 2) Goal difference; 3) Goals scored; 4) Play-off tie.
(Note: Clubs qualified for this phase with the full regular season points they got, but without goals for or against)
(C) Champions
Notes:

Pos	Team	Pld	W	D	L	GF	GA	GD	Pts
5	Modern Sport	8	5	2	1	12	7	+5	26
6	Al Ittihad	8	1	5	2	3	5	−2	26
7	Smouha	8	0	5	3	2	6	−4	25
8	Ismaily	8	2	3	3	7	7	0	23
9	Ghazl El Mahalla	8	1	3	4	4	12	−8	23

Source: Soccerway (relegation round)
Rules for classification: 1) Points; 2) Goal difference; 3) Goals scored; 4) Play-off tie.
(Note: Clubs qualified for this phase with the full regular season points they got, but without goals for or against)

==== Results summary ====
Overall								Home						Away					
Pld	W	D	L	GF	GA	GD	Pts	W	D	L	GF	GA	GD	W	D	L	GF	GA	GD
9	3	3	3	8	6	+2	12	2	3	0	5	3	+2	1	0	3	3	3	0

Last updated: 21 January 2025.

==== Results by round ====
Round	1	2	3	4	5	6	7	8	9
Ground	H	A	H	A	H	H	A	A	H
Result	D	L	W	L	D	D	W	L	W
Position	8	15	9	12					

Updated to match(es) played on 21 January 2025. Source:
A = Away; H = Home; W = Win; D = Draw; L = Loss

==== Matches ====
The league schedule was released on 19 October 2024.

2 November 2024 1	Ismaily	0–0	Ghazl El Mahalla	Ismailia
17:00 UTC+2				Stadium: Ismailia Stadium; Referee: Mohamed Marouf

9 November 2024 2	Ceramica Cleopatra	1–0	Ismaily	Cairo
20:00 UTC+2	Lakay 43'			Stadium: Osman Ahmed Osman Stadium; Referee: Ahmed Gamal

24 November 2024 3	Ismaily	1–0	Petrojet	Ismailia
17:00 UTC+2	Omar 90'			Stadium: Ismailia Stadium; Referee: Amin Omar

1 December 2024 4	ENPPI	1–0	Ismaily	Cairo
20:00 UTC+2	Shakshak 67'		Hamdy (penalty missed) 62'; Al-Nabris (penalty missed) 72'	Stadium: Petrosport Stadium; Referee: Ibrahim Mohamed

21 December 2024 5	Ismaily	1–1	Pyramids	Ismailia
20:00 UTC+2	Hamdi 29'		Galal 45'	Stadium: Ismailia Stadium; Referee: Abdelaziz El Sayed

25 December 2024 6	Ismaily	2–2	Haras El Hodoud	Ismailia
17:00 UTC+2	El Malawany 53'; Hamdi 64' (pen.)		Mamdouh 25'; Bayoumi 47' (o.g.)	Stadium: Ismailia Stadium; Referee: Hamada Al Qalawi

1 January 2025 7	Modern Sport	0–3 (Note: Ismaily was awarded a win after Modern Sport exceeded the permitted limit of five foreign players by fielding six. The match had originally ended in a 0–0 draw.)	Ismaily	Cairo
17:00 UTC+2				Stadium: Cairo International Stadium; Referee: Amin Omar

11 January 2025 8	National Bank	1–0	Ismaily	Cairo
16:00 UTC+2	Annor 49'

21 January 2025 9	Ismaily	1–0	Smouha	Ismailia
19:00 UTC+2	Al-Nabris 69'			Stadium: Ismailia Stadium; Referee: Ahmed El-Ghandour

=== Egypt Cup ===
4 January 2025 Round of 32	Ismaily	1–0	Tanta	Ismailia
14:30 UTC+2	El Malawany 28'			Stadium: Ismailia Stadium; Referee: Mahmoud Desouky

16 January 2025 Round of 16	ENPPI	1–0	Ismaily	Cairo
14:30 UTC+2	Ammar 6' (o.g.)			Stadium: Petrosport Stadium

=== Egyptian League Cup ===
==== Group stage ====
Pos	Team	Pld	W	D	L	GF	GA	GD	Pts	Qualification
1	Haras El Hodoud	3	3	0	0	5	1	+4	9	Advance to knockout stage
2	Ismaily	3	1	1	1	5	4	+1	4	Advance to knockout stage
3	Pyramids	3	1	1	1	4	4	0	4	
4	Al Ittihad	3	0	0	3	0	5	−5	0	

Source: EPL
Rules for classification: Group stage tiebreakers

11 December 2024 1	Haras El Hodoud	2–1	Ismaily	Alexandria
17:00 UTC+2	Gouda 21'; Abdelhakim 34'		Hamdi 11'	Stadium: Borg El Arab Stadium; Referee: Mohamed Al Ghazi

23 March 2025 2	Ismaily	v	Pyramids	Ismailia
				Stadium: Ismailia Stadium

22 April 2025 3	Ismaily	v	Al Ittihad	Ismailia
				Stadium: Ismailia Stadium

== Statistics ==
As of match played 21 January 2025

Rank	Pos.	No.	Nat.	Player	Premier League	Play-offs	Egypt Cup	League Cup	Total
1	MF	9	(Egypt)	Marwan Hamdi	2	0	0	1	3
1	FW	22	(Egypt)	Ali El Malawany	2	0	1	0	3
3	FW	33	(Palestine)	Khaled Al-Nabris	1	0	0	0	1
Own goals					0	0	0	0	0
Totals					8	0	1	1	10
