= Mohammed Shbair =

Palestinian footballer

Mohammed Shbair محمد شبير
Personal information
- Full name: Mohammed Abdullah Shbair
- Date of birth: 16 December 1986 (age 39)
- Place of birth: Gaza, Palestine
- Height: 1.78 m (5 ft 10 in)
- Position: Goalkeeper

Team information
- Current team: Shabab Al-Khaleel

Youth career
- Ittihad Khan Younis

Senior career*
Years	Team	Apps	(Gls)
–2008	Ittihad Khan Younis		(0)
2008–2010	Al-Am'ary (loan)		(3)
2010–	Shabab Al-Khaleel		(0)

International career^{‡}
2008–2013	Palestine	15	(0)
- * Club domestic league appearances and goals as of 21 August 2011 ‡ National team caps and goals as of 27 February 2012

Mohammed Shbair (Arabic: محمد شبير, born 16 December 1986 in Gaza, Palestine) is a Palestinian footballer. He plays as a goalkeeper for Shabab Al-Khaleel of the West Bank Premier League and Palestine. His first call-up to the national team came during the 2006 AFC Challenge Cup. He received his first cap in a 1-1 draw against Jordan in the first FIFA-sanctioned match to be held in Palestine. He has saved two penalties while playing for the national team the first in a 3-0 friendly loss to Iraq in 2009 and the second in a crucial 2014 FIFA World Cup qualifier against Thailand.
