= Mohammed Barakat (footballer) =

Palestinian footballer (1984–2024)

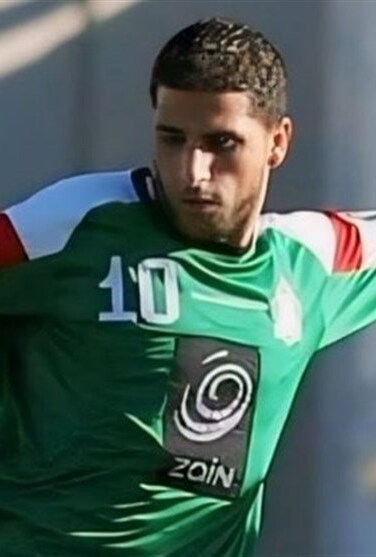

Personal information
- Date of birth: 22 June 1984
- Place of birth: Khan Younis, Gaza Strip, Palestine
- Date of death: 11 March 2024 (aged 39)
- Place of death: Khan Younis, Gaza Strip, Palestine
- Position: Forward

Senior career*
Years	Team	Apps	(Gls)
- Shabab Khan Younis
- Al Sadaqa
- Ittihad Khanyounis
- Al Wehdat
2016–2019	Al Shoalah		
–2023	Ahly Gaza		

International career
2013	Palestine	3	(0)
- * Club domestic league appearances and goals

Mohammed Barakat (Arabic: محمد بركات; 22 June 1984 – 11 March 2024) was a Palestinian footballer who played as a forward. Nicknamed "the Lion" and "the Legend of Khan Younis", Barakat was the first centurion player in Palestinian football history, having scored 114 goals for Khan Younis Youth Club (Shabab Khan Younis). Prior to his death, the last club he played for was Ahly Gaza in the Gaza Strip Premier League.

== International career ==
Barakat made his debut for the Palestine national team on 2 March 2013 in a 1–0 victory against Bangladesh at the 2014 AFC Challenge Cup qualification. He also played in a 9–0 victory against Northern Mariana Islands in the same tournament two days later. However, he was not selected to play in the 2014 AFC Challenge Cup.

His last appearance for the national team came in a 2–0 friendly defeat against Qatar on 17 April 2013.

== Death ==
Barakat was killed by the Israel Defence Force during an airstrike on 11 March 2024, amid the Siege of Khan Yunis. He was 39. His remains were found in his destroyed home in Khan Yunis.

In July 2026, the Israel Defense Forces alleged Barakat and 12 other Palestinian athletes to be a member of the Palestinian Islamic Jihad and alleged that he had infiltrated Israel during the 7 October 2023 attack.
