= 2016–17 Gaza Strip Premier League =

Gaza Strip Premier League
- Season: 2016–17
- Champions: Al-Sadaqa
- Relegated: Al-Tofah, Khadamat Khan Younes
- Top goalscorer: Suleiman Obeid (15 goals)
- Biggest home win: Shabab Rafah 5-0 Al-Tofah (4 March 2017)
- Biggest away win: Al-Sadaqa 4-0 Ittihad Shejaia (1 October 2016)

The 2016–17 Gaza Strip Premier League is the 2016–17 season of the top football league in the Gaza Strip of Palestine.

== Standings ==
Pos	Team	Pld	W	D	L	GF	GA	GD	Pts	Relegation
1	Al-Sadaqa (C)	22	11	7	4	31	18	+13	40	
2	Shabab Rafah	22	11	6	5	36	17	+19	39	
3	Khadamat Rafah	22	10	9	3	25	15	+10	39	
4	Shabab Khan Younes	22	9	10	3	31	22	+9	37	
5	Khadamat Al-Shatea	22	7	7	8	27	30	−3	28	
6	Al-Ittihad Khan Younes	22	6	9	7	26	29	−3	27	
7	Al-Ahli Gaza	22	5	10	7	22	25	−3	25	
8	Al-Ittihad Shejaia	22	6	7	9	22	27	−5	25	
9	Gaza Sports Club	22	4	11	7	22	23	−1	23	
10	Al-Hilal Gaza	22	5	8	9	20	27	−7	23	
11	Al-Tofah (R)	22	4	9	9	22	34	−12	21	Relegation to the Gaza Strip First League
12	Khadamat Khan Younes (R)	22	3	9	10	20	37	−17	18	Relegation to the Gaza Strip First League

Source: "Palestine premier league for Gaza strip Clubs 2016/2017 [sic]". Goalzz.
Rules for classification: 1) points; 2) goal difference; 3) number of goals scored.
(C) Champions; (R) Relegated

== See also ==
- 2016–17 West Bank Premier League
- 2016–17 Palestine Cup
