= 2019–20 Gaza Strip Premier League =

Sports in Gaza

The 2019–20 Gaza Strip Premier League was the 2019–20 season of the Gaza Strip Premier League, the top football league in the Gaza Strip of Palestine. The season started on 31 August 2019 and ended on 11 March 2020.

== Teams ==
A total of 12 teams competed in the league. Khidmat Rafah were the defending champions. Al-Ahli Beit Hanoun and Khidmat Khan Yunis were relegated from last season and were replaced by promoted teams Beit Hanoun and Al-Ahli Gaza.

- Al-Ahli Gaza
- Al-Hilal Gaza
- Al-Ittihad Khan Yunis
- Al-Ittihad Shuja'iyya
- Al-Sadaqah
- Beit Hanoun
- Gaza Sports Club
- Khidmat Al-Shatia
- Khidmat Rafah
- Shabab Jabalia
- Shabab Khan Yunis
- Shabab Rafah

== League table ==
Pos	Team	P	W	D	L	GF	GA	GD	Pts	Qualification or relegation
1	Khadamat Rafah (C)	22	12	8	2	38	16	+22	44	
2	Khadamat Al-Shatea	22	7	13	2	31	27	+4	34	
3	Al-Ittihad Shejaia	22	8	9	5	28	28	0	33	
4	Beit Hanoun	22	8	8	6	24	21	+3	32	
5	Shabab Jabalia	22	6	13	3	28	19	+9	31	
6	Al-Hilal Gaza	22	7	8	7	28	22	+6	29	
7	Al-Ittihad Khan Younes	22	7	7	8	27	27	0	28	
8	Al-Sadaqa	22	6	9	7	23	23	0	27	
9	Shabab Rafah	22	5	11	6	22	24	-2	26	
10	Shabab Khan Younes	22	6	7	9	24	24	0	25	
11	Gaza Sports Club (R)	22	6	6	10	22	29	-7	24	Relegation to Gaza Strip First League
12	Al-Ahli Gaza (R)	22	1	7	14	25	60	-35	10	Relegation to Gaza Strip First League
