= Khaled Al-Nabris =

Palestinian footballer (born 2003)

Personal information
- Date of birth: 27 March 2003 (age 23)
- Place of birth: Khan Yunis, Palestine
- Height: 1.83 m (6 ft 0 in)
- Position: Forward

Team information
- Current team: Cleopatra FC

Senior career*
Years	Team	Apps	(Gls)
2020–2021	Markaz Shabab Al-Am'ari		
2021–2022	Ittihad Khanyounis		
2022	Ismaily	13	(1)
2022–2023	Khadamat Khanyounis		
2023–2024	Ittihad Khanyounis		
2024–2026	Ismaily	45	(2)
2026–	Cleopatra FC	4	(1)

International career^{‡}
2019	Palestine U19	2	(2)
2021–	Palestine U23	13	(2)
2025–	Palestine	9	(0)
- * Club domestic league appearances and goals as of 31 October 2026 ‡ National team caps and goals as of 14 November 2026

Khaled Al-Nabris (Arabic: خالد النبريص; born 27 March 2003) is a Palestinian footballer who plays as a forward for the Palestine national team and the Egyptian Premier League club Cleopatra FC.

== Club career ==
Al-Nabris won the title of top scorer of the 2020–21 Palestinian Premier League in the Gaza Strip with 17 goals.

In 2022 he received an invitation to train with Real Oviedo in Spain.

On 24 January 2022, he joined Ismaily SC on a four-and-a-half-season contract. He scored his first league goal on 18 August 2022, in a match resulting in a 4–1 defeat to Al Masry.

In February 2024, he rejoined the club after previously leaving over unpaid dues and taking the case to the Court of Arbitration for Sport. In June 2024, he renewed his contract with the club until 2027.

On 18 June 2026, following the club's relegation, he terminated his contract.

== International career ==
In 2019, Al-Nabris was selected to join the U-19 team for the 2020 AFC Asian Cup qualifiers in Oman. He went on to score four goals, netting two each against Pakistan and Kuwait. He received a call-up to play with the Under-23 national team in the 2023 Arab Games. He was called up to the Palestine national team for a set of friendlies in November 2025.
