= Faisal Iqbal (footballer) =

Pakistani footballer

Personal information
- Full name: Faisal Iqbal
- Date of birth: 16 August 1992 (age 34)
- Place of birth: Bahawalpur, Pakistan
- Position: Left-back

Senior career*
Years	Team	Apps	(Gls)
2011–2019	National Bank	63	(0)
2015	→ B.G. Sports Club (loan)	0	(0)

International career
2011–2014	Pakistan U23		
2011–2018	Pakistan	22	(0)
- * Club domestic league appearances and goals

Faisal Iqbal (born 16 August 1992) is a Pakistani former footballer who played as a left-back.

== Club career ==
Iqbal started his career with National Bank in 2011.

He briefly joined Dhivehi Premier League club B.G. Sports in 2015. After returning to National Bank, he last represented the club in the 2018–19 Pakistan Premier League.

== International career ==
Iqbal earned his first senior international cap against Turkmenistan in the qualifiers for the 2012 AFC Challenge Cup. Iqbal also represented the Pakistan under-23 national side, scoring his first goal in the 84th minute in a 2–2 draw against Palestine in Al-Nakba International Football Cup 2012. In 2012, Iqbal played at the 2013 AFC U-22 Championship qualification with the Pakistan under-23 team. He also played in three-match friendly series against India under-23 in 2014. He was last called during the 2018 SAFF Championship, where he remained an unused substitute.

He was vice-captain of the national team from 2011 until 2014.

== Coaching career ==
After stepping down from football, Iqbal became lecturer at the Faculty of Sports Sciences at the Islamia University of Bahawalpur in 2020. In early 2022, Iqbal conducted trials for the Global Soccer Ventures (GSV) talent hunt with the Irish Premier League Club St Patrick’s Athletic FC coaches along with former national teammate Muhammad Adil. In later 2022, following Pakistan's return at football in nearly three-and-a-half years because of the Pakistan Football Federation's suspension by FIFA, Iqbal was member of the staff conducting tryouts for the Pakistan women's national football team and the Pakistan national under-17 football team in Karachi.

== Career statistics ==
=== International ===
Appearances and goals by year and competition
National team	Year	Apps	Goals
Pakistan	2011	7	0
Pakistan	2012	1	0
Pakistan	2013	12	0
Pakistan	2014	2	0
Total		22	0
