= Majed Asad Stadium =

Football stadium in Al-Bireh, Palestine

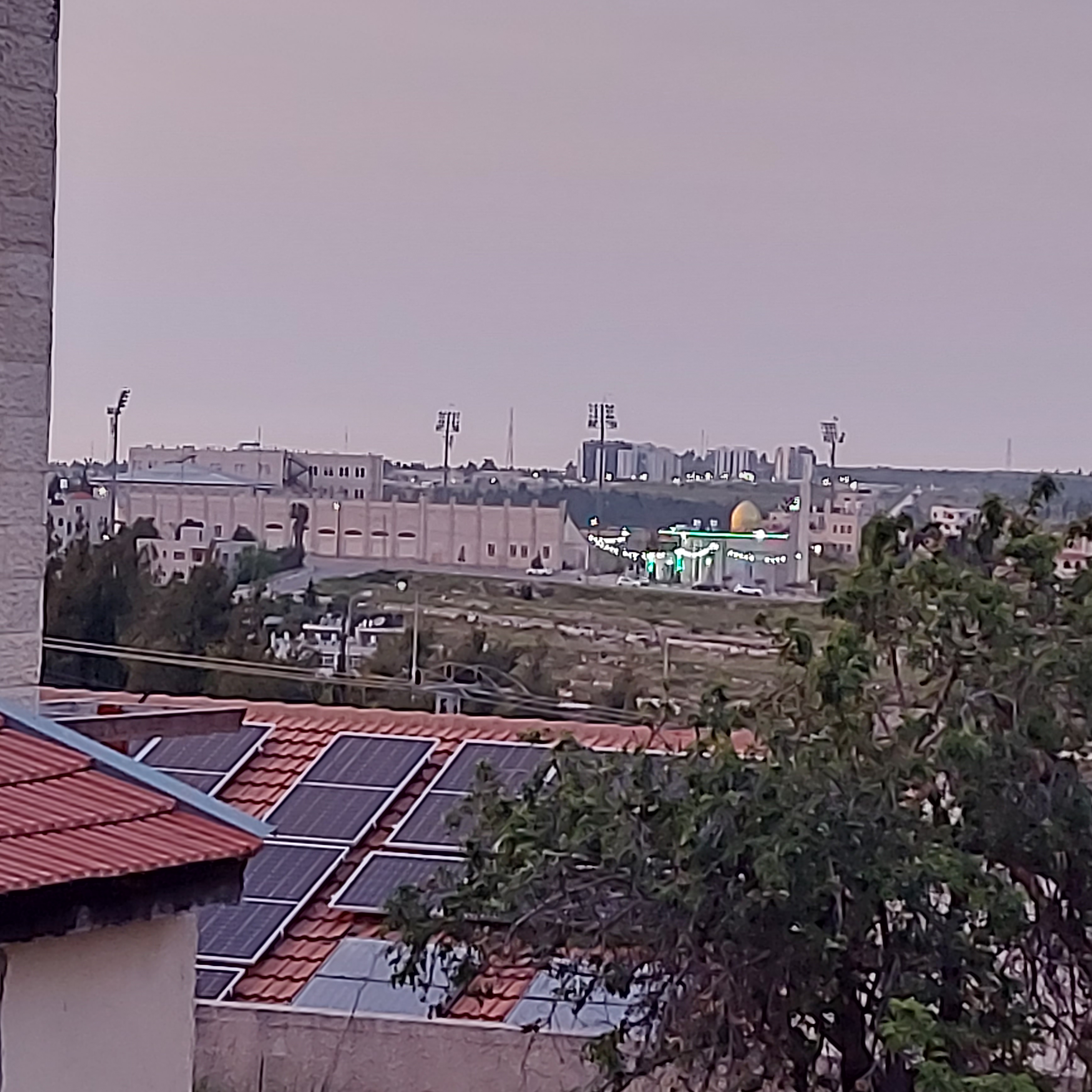
- Interactive map of Majed Asad Stadium
- Former names: Al-Bireh International Stadium
- Location: Al-Bireh, Ramallah and al-Bireh Governorate, Palestine
- Coordinates: 31°54′25″N 35°13′29″E
- Capacity: 9000
- Surface: Grass

Construction
- Opened: 2011

Majed Asad Stadium is a football stadium in Al-Bireh, Palestine. The stadium's construction was funded with aid from the French and German governments, and French footballer Lilian Thuram participated in the inauguration, taking the first kick of the Palestine Cup final.

== Al Nakba International Football Tournament ==
The stadium was the venue for matches in the 2012 Palestine International Cup. Vietnam and Pakistan played out a goalless draw at the stadium.
