= Houssam Wadi =

Palestinian footballer

Houssam Wadi حسام وادي
Personal information
- Date of birth: August 25, 1986 (age 40)
- Place of birth: Gaza, Palestine
- Height: 5 ft 10 in (1.78 m)
- Positions: Defender; holding midfielder

Team information
- Current team: Markaz Shabab Al-Am'ari
- Number: 18

Youth career
- 1996–2003: Ittihad Shajeiyah

Senior career*
Years	Team	Apps	(Gls)
2003–08	Ittihad Shajeiyah		
2008–09	Shabab Al-Dhahrieh (loan)		
2009–10	Al-Am'ary (loan)		
2010–11	Jabal Al-Mokaber		
2011	Markaz Shabab Al-Am'ari	0	(0)
2011	Ittihad Shajeiyah		
2012	Markaz Shabab Al-Am'ari		

International career^{‡}
2007-2012	Palestine	19	(2)
- * Club domestic league appearances and goals as of 7 August 2011 ‡ National team caps and goals as of 07 December, 2012

Houssam Wadi (Arabic: حسام وادي; born August 8, 1986, in Gaza, Palestine) is a Palestinian professional football (soccer) player currently playing for Gazan club Ittihad Shajeiyah after voiding his contract with Al-Am'ary of the West Bank Premier League. He is known for his versatility, able to play as a centre back and holding midfielder. Wadi scored his first official national team goal against Afghanistan in 2014 World Cup qualifying in the first competitive international match played in Palestine.

== International goals ==
Houssam Wadi: International Goals
#	Date	Venue	Opponent	Score	Result	Competition
1.	3 July 2011	Al-Ram, Palestine	Afghanistan	1–0	1–1	2014 FIFA World Cup qualification
2.	12 March 2012	Kathmandu, Nepal	Maldives	1–0	2–0	2012 AFC Challenge Cup
