= Faisal Al-Husseini International Stadium =

Association football stadium in Jerusalem Governorate, Palestine

- Interactive map of Faisal Al-Husseini International Stadium
- Location: Ar-Ram, Jerusalem Governorate, Palestine
- Coordinates: 31°50′51″N 35°13′49″E
- Capacity: 12,500
- Surface: Artificial turf

Construction
- Opened: 2008
- Cost: US$4 million (renovation)

Tenants
- Palestine national football team (2008–present); Hilal Al-Quds Club

Faisal Al-Husseini International Stadium (Arabic: ملعب فيصل الحسيني الدولي) is an association football stadium on Dahiat al'Barid Street of Al-Ram in Jerusalem Governorate, Palestine. It is one of the home stadiums of the Palestine national football team. The stadium was named after Faisal Husseini, a Palestinian politician. It has a seating capacity of 12,500 spectators.

It serves as the home venue for the Palestinian Football Association. The Abu Ammar Cup, named in honor of the former Palestinian president Yasser Arafat, who held the positions of Chairman of the Palestine Liberation Organization (PLO) from 1969 to 2004 and President of the Palestinian National Authority (PNA) from 1994 to 2004, is a prestigious tournament that showcases the talent of teams from the West Bank Premier League.

== History ==
Under the leadership of FIFA wishing to develop football in Palestine, numerous stadiums were created or renovated in 2007. After a first phase of work in 2007, the first meeting took place in the Faisal Al-Husseini International Stadium takes place on November 2, 2007 as part of the Al Quds Cup between the Staff Club and Umm Tuba Club.

The second phase of work began in February 2008 with the installation of synthetic turf on the playing field then lighting poles in October. In 2019, the stadium underwent renovations still financed by FIFA, a new synthetic turf and additional seats were installed.

On 30 March 2023, Israeli forces forcibly entered the Faisal Al Husseini international stadium and deployed tear gas onto the field and into the stands, causing a temporary halt to the final match of the Abu Ammar Cup. During this interruption, both players and fans received necessary medical attention. The Israeli incursion appears to have occurred without any immediate provocation, and as of now, the Israeli authorities have refrained from providing an official statement regarding the incident or identifying the individuals who authorized the military personnel to target players and spectators within the stadium.

In 2024, the Bank of Palestine organized a match between Palestine Olympic Team and Tunisia Olympic Team.

== Palestine international matches ==
On 26 October 2008, the team played Jordan in their first-ever home international in 10 years of FIFA membership. In attendance were FIFA President Sepp Blatter and Palestinian Prime Minister Salam Fayyad. On 29 October 2009, the Palestinian national women's football team played its first home international match against Jordan before a capacity crowd at the stadium.

On 9 March 2011, Palestine "played its first ever competitive match at home in the West Bank". It was the second leg of a qualifier for the 2012 Olympic Games, against Thailand. Thailand had won the first leg 1–0 in Bangkok; Palestine won the second 1–0 at the stadium, with a goal by Abdelhamid Abuhabib in the 43rd minute. The draw on aggregate led to a penalty shootout, with Thailand winning 6–5. Attending the match was Prime Minister Fayyad, who described it as a "historic day".

9 March 2011

Palestine	1–0 (1–1 on aggregate)	Thailand
Abuhabib 43'
Penalties
	5–6

Faisal Al-Husseini International Stadium, Al-Ram

On 3 July 2011, the stadium hosted "the first World Cup game ever to be played at home in the Palestinian territories". The game was the second leg of a two-match encounter against Afghanistan, in the first round of the Asian Football Confederation qualifiers for the 2014 FIFA World Cup. The game was a draw, enabling Palestine to advance to the second round on aggregate. Afghanistan were eliminated.

3 July 2011
17:00 UTC+3

Palestine	1–1	Afghanistan
Wadi 12'	Report	Arezou 63'

Faisal Al-Husseini International Stadium, Al-Ram
Attendance: 9,000
Referee: Banjar Al-Dosari (Qatar)

== See also ==
- Dura International Stadium
- Palestine Stadium
- Nablus Football Stadium
