= Palestinian Football Association =

Governing body for football in Palestine

AFC
- Short name: PFA
- Founded: 1962; 64 years ago
- Headquarters: Jerusalem
- FIFA affiliation: Provisional: 31 May 1995; Full member: 1998
- AFC affiliation: 1995 (provisional member); 1998
- WAFF affiliation: 2000
- President: Jibril Rajoub
- Website: pfa.ps

The Palestinian Football Association (Arabic: الاتحاد الفلسطيني لكرة القدم) is the governing body for football in Palestine, and for the men's national team and the women's national team.

== History ==
The first "Palestine Football Association", was founded during the period of Mandatory Palestine in a meeting held on 14 August 1928, and applied for membership of FIFA. It was admitted provisionally on 17 December 1928, affiliated on 17 May 1929 and recognised by FIFA's government on 6 July 1929. The FAP changed its name to the Israel Football Association (IFA) following the founding of the state of Israel in 1948.

A new "Palestine Football Association" representing the Palestinian Arabs was formed in 1962, originally only for the territory of the Egyptian occupation of the Gaza Strip, and has been a member of the Union of Arab Football Associations since it was formed in 1974.

=== Palestinian Authority and FIFA recognition ===
It was accepted as a member by FIFA in 1998, after the creation of the Palestinian Authority. The PFA has also been a member of the Asian Football Confederation (AFC) since 1998, in the West Asian Football Federation.

On 11 February 2011, the PFA formed the first women's league.

On 30 July 2025, EFE reported that Palestine head coach Ehab Abu Jazar was seeking to establish a training center for the national team in Chile.

== Divisions ==
The football division system is parted into two: the West Bank and Gaza Strip. There is a men's West Bank Premier League and a men's Gaza Strip Premier League as well as a West Bank Women's League.

== Management ==
- President: General Jibril Rajoub
- First Vice-president: Ibrahim Abu Saleem
- Vice-president: Susan Shalabi, Ziab El Khatib
- General Secretary: Omar Abu Hashia

Name	Position	Source
(Palestine) Jibril Rajoub	President	
(Palestine) Ibrahim Abu Salim	Vice President	
(Palestine) Susan Shalabi Molano	2nd Vice President	
(Palestine) Ziad Bekai	3rd Vice President	
(Palestine) Firas Abu Hilal	General Secretary	
(Palestine) Ibrahim Eleyan	Treasurer	
(Palestine) Abdalnasser Barakat	Technical Director	
(Tunisia) Makram Daboub	Team Coach (Men's)	
(Palestine) Ahmad Sharaf	Team Coach (Women's)	
(Palestine) Ghassan Jaradat	Media/Communications Manager	
(Palestine) Anan Waleed	Futsal Coordinator	
(Palestine) Hussam Al Hussein	Referee Coordinator	

== See also ==
- West Bank Premier League
- Gaza Strip Premier League
- Gaza Strip First League
- Palestine Cup
- Palestinian sports during the 2023–2024 Israeli invasion of Gaza
