= Nablus Football Stadium =

Football stadium in Nablus, Palestine

Coordinates: 32.2203°N 35.2789°E

The Nablus Football Stadium (Arabic: ملعب بلدية نابلس) is a football stadium in Nablus, Palestine. It has a capacity of 30,000. The stadium is home to the city's football club Al-Ittihad, which competes in the main league of Palestine. The club participated in the Middle East Mediterranean Scholar Athlete Games in 2000.

== History ==
The stadium was constructed in 1950 and is the first stadium in Palestine. In 2009 it was rebuilt and expanded to meet the FIFA standards. The development of the stadium has made its capacity to be 30,000 and the whole project cost was $1.5 million.
