= Gaza Strip Premier League =

Football competition

- Founded: 1976; 50 years ago
- Country: Palestine
- Confederation: PFA
- Number of clubs: 12
- Level on pyramid: 1
- Relegation to: Gaza Strip First League
- Domestic cup(s): Palestine Cup, Yasser Arafat Cup (sometimes)
- International cup(s): AFC Cup, Arab Champions League (proposed)
- Current champions: Khadamat Rafah
- Most championships: Khadamat Rafah (7)
- Website: pfa.ps

Gaza Strip Premier League (Arabic: الدوري الممتاز الفلسطيني لقطاع غزة) is one of the two top divisions organized by the Palestinian Football Association. The other is the West Bank Premier League. It has been disputed since 1984. The 5,000-capacity Rafah Municipal Stadium is the main venue for the league. The league has not been played since 2023.

== Clubs ==
2023–24 season:

- Ittihad Shojaeyya
- Khadamat Rafah
- Ittihad Khanyounis
- Khadamat Al-Shatea
- Shabab Rafah
- Shabab Jabalia
- Ahli Gaza
- Shabab Khanyounis
- Al Sadaka
- Gaza Sport
- Ittihad Beit Hanoun
- Hilal Gaza

== Champions ==
Champions so far are:

- 1984–85: Al-Ahli Gaza
- 1985–86: Khadamat Al-Shatea
- 1986–87: Khadamat Al-Shatea
- 1987–95: Not known
- 1995–96: Khadamat Rafah
- 1996–97: Not known
- 1997–98: Khadamat Rafah
- 1998–05: Not known
- 2005–06: Khadamat Rafah
- 2007–10: Not known
- 2010–11: Shabab Khan Yunis
- 2011–12: Not known
- 2012–13: Shabab Rafah
- 2013–14: Shabab Rafah
- 2014–15: Al-Ittihad Shuja'iyya
- 2015–16: Khadamat Rafah
- 2016–17: Al-Sadaqah
- 2017–18: Shabab Khan Yunis
- 2018–19: Khadamat Rafah
- 2019–20: Khadamat Rafah
- 2020–21: Shabab Rafah
- 2021–22: Shabab Rafah
- 2022–23: Khadamat Rafah
