= Palestine Stadium =

Stadium in Gaza City, Gaza Strip, Palestine

Coordinates: 31°31′19.4″N 34°27′5.1″E

- ملعب فلسطين
- Interactive map of Palestine Stadium
- Full name: Palestine International Stadium
- Location: Al-Rimal, Gaza City; Gaza Strip, Palestine
- Owner: Palestinian Authority
- Capacity: 10,000
- Surface: Grass

Construction
- Opened: 1967
- Demolished: April 2006 (destroyed); October 2023 (destroyed)
- Rebuilt: 2019

Tenant
- Palestine national football team

Palestine Stadium (Arabic: ملعب فلسطين) is located in Gaza City, Gaza Strip, Palestine. It is the national stadium and the home of Palestine national football team. The stadium's capacity is around 10,000.

== History ==
Palestine Stadium was first built in 1967.

On April 1, 2006, the stadium was bombed by Israel. The munition struck the exact middle of the pitch, which made the stadium unusable due to the crater that formed. FIFA announced that it would fund the repair work. It was again bombed on November 19, 2012, by the Israeli Defence Force as part of Operation Pillar of Cloud. Israel claimed that the latest bombing was due to its use by Hamas militants to launch rockets targeting Israel. The stadium and a nearby indoor sports hall suffered major damage. As a result, 52 football players from around the globe (including Eden Hazard, Papiss Cisse, and Demba Ba) signed a petition calling for Israel to be banned from hosting a football tournament the following year.

As of 2019, the stadium had been repaired by FIFA and has hosted several events, both in the indoor sports halls and the outdoor field. These events included the International Amputee Football Championships in 2019, hosted in partnership with the Red Cross.

On October 8, 2023, Israeli warplanes bombed the stadium as part of a larger attack on the Gaza Strip, which also included Islamic National Bank buildings as well as residential and public buildings.

The stadium was targeted again by Israeli airstrikes in March 2024, leaving it inoperable as the Palestinian national team sought to qualify for the 2026 FIFA World Cup. The national team used the Sharjah Stadium in the United Arab Emirates as their new home venue.
