= Ittihad Khan Younis =

- Nicknames: The Mills; Al-Itti
- Founded: 1994; 32 years ago
- Ground: Sports City Stadium, Khan Younis
- Manager: Raafat Khalifa
- League: Gaza Strip Premier League
- 2022–23: Gaza Strip Premier League, 5th of 12
- Website: EthadKh MC on Facebook
Home colors	Away colors

Ittihad Khan Younis (Arabic: اتحاد خان يونس) is a football club based in Khan Younis, Palestine. It was founded in 1994. The club competes in the Gaza Strip Premier League. The club's domestic rivals are Shabab Khanyounis and Khadamat Khanyounis.

== History ==
Ittihad Khanyounis participated first in the upper division of the national championship in 1998 and finished seventh. The club's kit was previously all blue, now it is orange, and the reserve is black.

== See also ==
- List of football clubs in the State of Palestine
