= Dura International Stadium =

Stadium in Dura, Palestine

Coordinates: 31.507053°N 35.032164°E

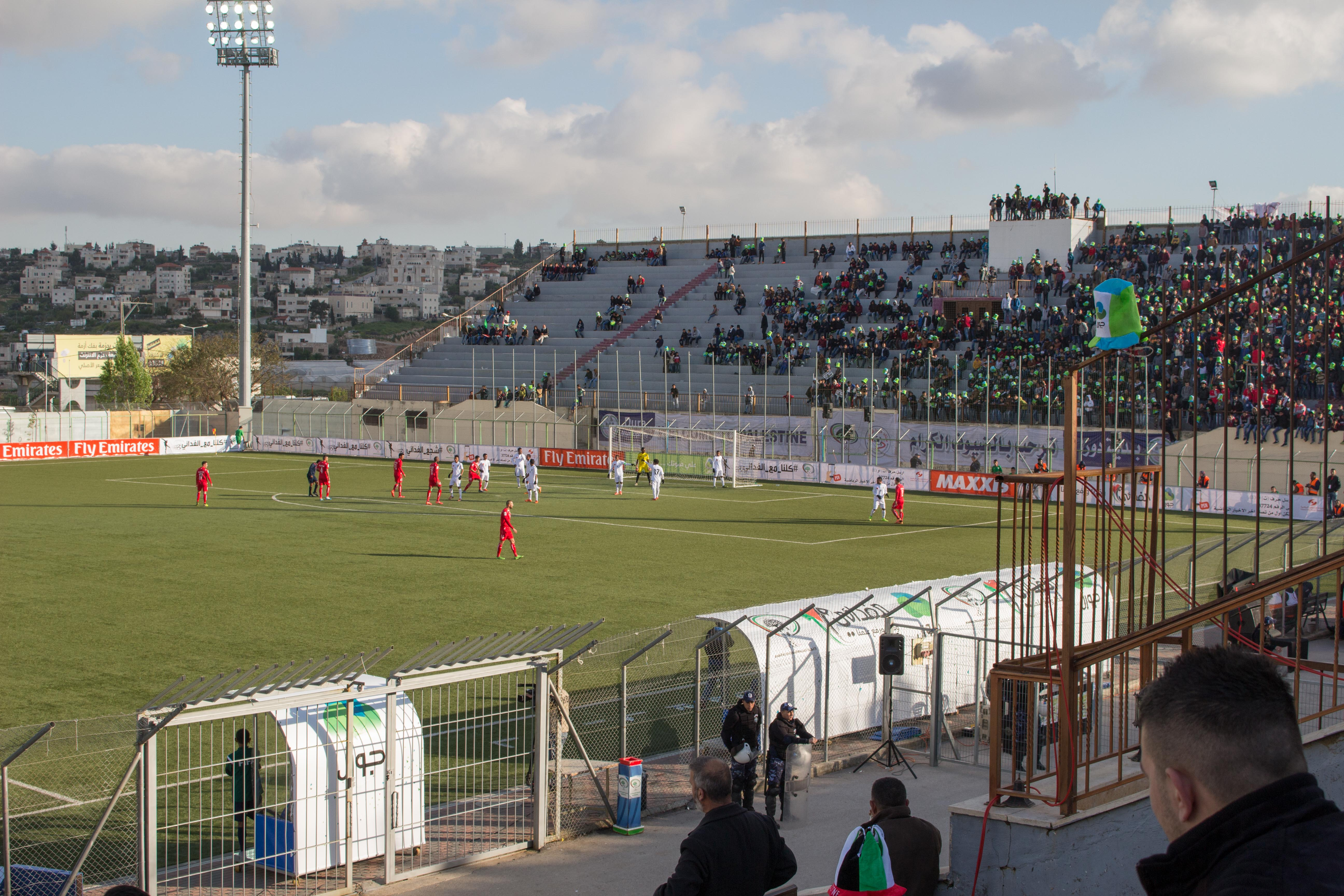
- A crowd watches Palestine and East Timor play a World Cup Qualifier match at Dura Stadium, 29 March 2016
- Interactive map of Dura International Stadium
- Full name: Dura International Stadium
- Location: Dura, Hebron Governorate, Palestine
- Capacity: 18,000

Construction
- Opened: 1965
- Renovated: 1999, 2011

Tenants
- Shabab Al-Dhahiriya SC; Palestine national football team

Dura International Stadium (Arabic: ملعب دورا الدولي) is a football stadium in the city of Dura in the Hebron Governorate, Palestine. It was opened in 1965 and was renovated in 1999 and 2011. It has a capacity of 18,000 and the surface is artificial turf.

In February 2018, the stadium was named after Houari Boumédiène, the second president of Algeria and a supporter of Palestinian President Yasser Arafat.

In November 2019 the world's largest keffiyeh, measuring 3,000 square meters was unveiled at the stadium in honor of the late President Arafat.

Shabab Al-Dhahiriya SC, the most popular football club from Palestine, often play domestic league games at the Dura International Stadium in front of thousands of spectators. Some of the league games took place in front of capacity crowds of 18,000.
