= Al-Ram =

Al-Ram الرَّام (Arabic)
- Municipality type B

Arabic transcription(s)
  - Arabic: الرّام
  - Latin: al-Ramm (official) al-Ram (unofficial)
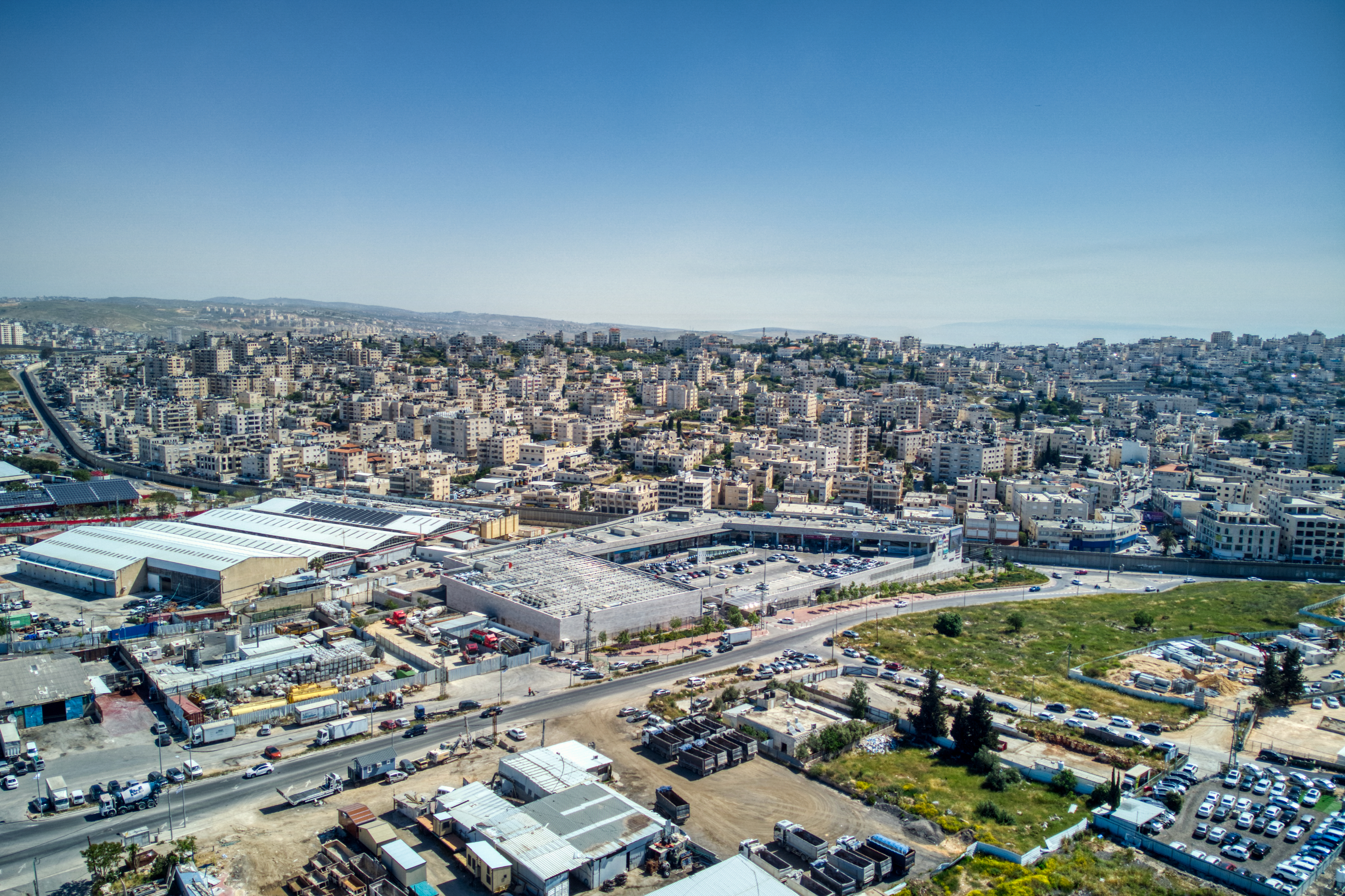
- Al-Ram behind the separation barrier

- Location of Al-Ram within Palestine
- Coordinates: 31°51′13″N 35°14′00″E
- Palestine grid: 172/140
- State: State of Palestine
- Governorate: Quds

Government
  - Type: Municipality

Area
  - Total: 3.3 km^{2} (1.3 sq mi)

Population (2017)
  - Total: 15,814
  - Density: 4,800/km^{2} (12,000/sq mi)
- Name meaning: From Hebrew Ramah, "The Hill". In Arabic: "Stagnant water"

Al-Ram (Arabic: الرّام), also transcribed as Al-Ramm, El-Ram, Er-Ram, and A-Ram, is a Palestinian town which lies northeast of Jerusalem, just outside the city's municipal border. The village is part of the built-up urban area of Jerusalem, the Atarot industrial zone and Beit Hanina lie to the west, and Neve Yaakov borders it on the south, with a built-up area of 3,289 dunums. According to the Palestinian Central Bureau of Statistics, a-Ram had a population of 15,814 in 2017. The head of A-Ram's village council estimates that 58,000 people live there, more than half of them holding Israeli identity cards.

== History ==
Al-Ram identified with Ramah in Benjamin, a town mentioned multiple times in the Bible. Archeological evidence shows that the town was heavily populated during the Iron Age II, declined during the Persian period, and later revived during the Hellenistic period.

=== Classical period ===
Ossuaries dated to the first century BC and CE were discovered at Al-Ram bearing Hebrew inscriptions with names such as Miriam, Yehohanan, and Shimon ben Zekhariya.

=== Crusader period ===
In Crusader sources, Al-Ram was named Aram, Haram, Rama, Ramatha, Ramitta, or Ramathes. Al-Ram was one of 21 villages given by Godfrey of Bouillon (r. 1099–1100) as a fief to the Church of the Holy Sepulchre. All the inhabitants of the village who were mentioned in Crusader sources between 1152 and 1160 had names which imply they were Christian. The village was mentioned around 1161, when a dispute about a land boundary was settled.

=== Ottoman period ===
In 1517, the village became part of the Ottoman Empire along with the rest of Palestine. In the 1596 tax records, it appeared as Rama, located in the Nahiya of Jabal Quds of the Liwa of Al-Quds. The population was 28 households, all Muslim. They paid a fixed tax-rate of 33,3% on agricultural products, including wheat, barley, olive trees and vineyards, in addition to occasional revenues, goats and beehives; a total of 4700 akçe.

In 1838, Edward Robinson found the village to be very poor and small, but large stones and scattered columns indicated that it had previously been an important place. In 1870 the French explorer Victor Guérin found the village to have 200 inhabitants, while an Ottoman village list of about the same year showed that Er-Ram had 32 houses and a population of 120, though the population count included men only.

In 1883, the PEF's Survey of Western Palestine described Er-Ram as a "small village in a conspicuous position on the top of a white hill, with olives. It has a well to the south. [..] The houses are of stone, partly built of old material". "West of the village is a good birkeh with a pointed vault; lower down the hill a pillar-shaft broken in two, probably from the church. On the hill are cisterns. Drafted stones are used up in the village walls. At Khan-er-Ram, by the main road, is a quarry with half-finished blocks still in it, and two cisterns. The Khan appears to be quite modern, and is in ruins. There are extensive quarries on the hill-sides near it."

In 1896, the population of Er-Ram was estimated to be about 240 persons.

=== British Mandate period ===
In the 1922 census of Palestine conducted by the British Mandate authorities, Al-Ram had a population of 208, all Muslims. This had increased in the 1931 census to 262, still all Muslim, in 51 houses. Al-Ram suffered badly in the 1927 earthquake, with old walls collapsing.

In a survey in 1945, Al-Ram had a population of 350, all Muslims, and a total land area of 5,598 dunams. 441 dunams were designated for plantations and irrigable land, 2,291 for cereals, while 14 dunams were built-up area.

=== Jordanian period ===
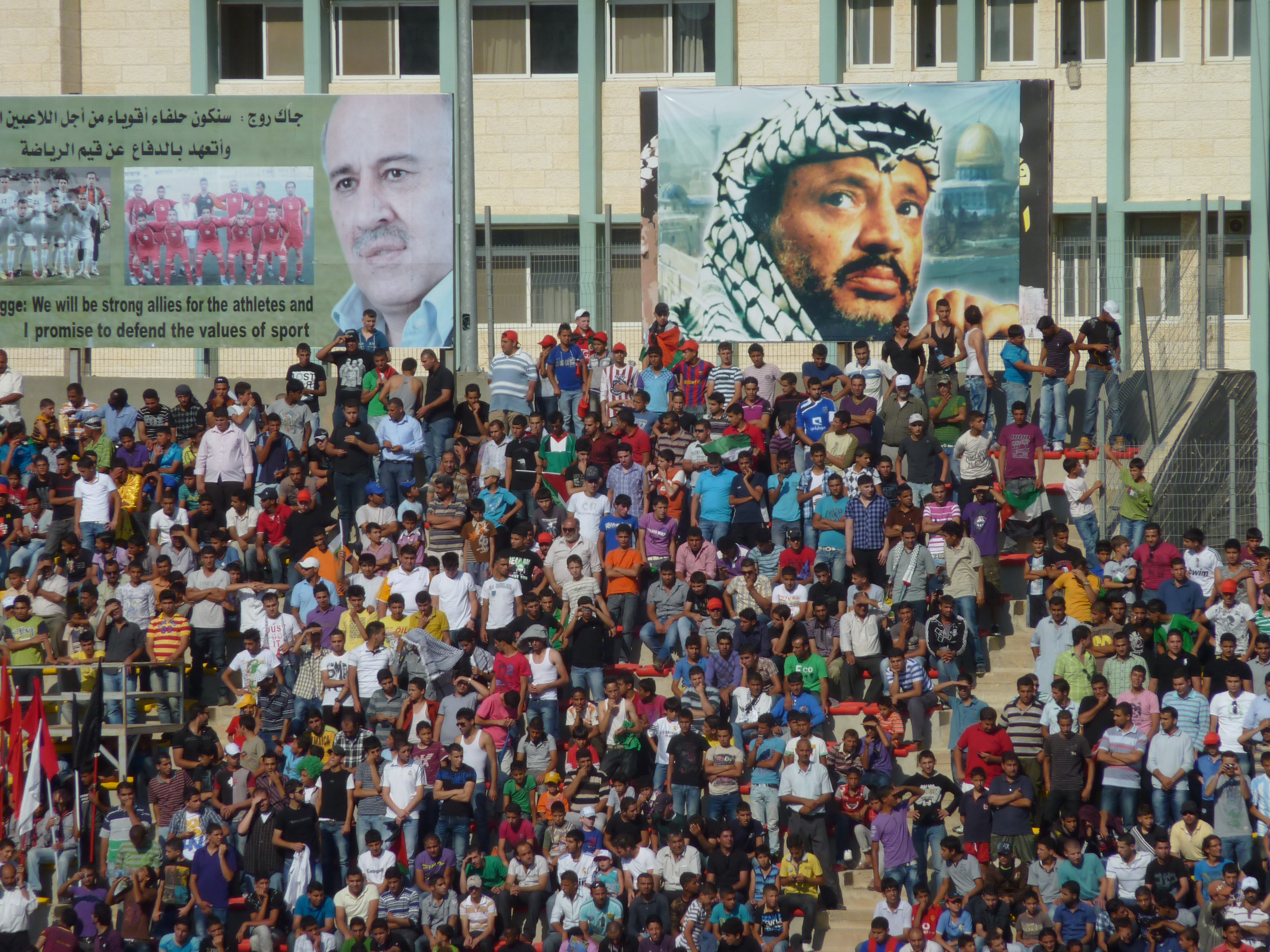
The Faisal Al-Husseini Stadium in Al-Ram, 2011

In the wake of the 1948 Arab–Israeli War, and after the 1949 Armistice Agreements, Al-Ram came under Jordanian rule.

In 1961, the population of Al-Ram was 769.

=== Post-1967 ===
Since the Six-Day War in 1967, Al-Ram has been under Israeli occupation.

The population in a 1967 census conducted by the Israeli authorities was 860, 86 of whom originated from the Israeli territory.

According to ARIJ, after the 1995 accords, 33.2% (or about ~2,226 dunums) of Al-Ram's land is classified as Area B land, while the remaining 66.8% (~4,482 dunums) was defined as Area C. Israel has confiscated land from Al-Ram in order to build two Israeli settlement/Industrial parks:

- 315 dunums were taken for Neve Ya'akov,
- 56 dunums were taken for the industrial Atarot site.

In 2006, the Israeli High Court rejected three petitions objecting to the construction of a security barrier separating Al-Ram from Jerusalem. The route of the fence planned to encircle northern Jerusalem has been revised several times. The latest plan, effectively implemented, called for a "minimalist" route following the municipal boundary at a distance of several hundred meters. This has left the town of Al-Ram almost entirely outside of the fence, with the exception of the southern part of the town, called Dahiyat al-Barid.

== Archaeology ==
=== Neolithic mask ===
The Survey of Western Palestine mentions that Dr. Chaplin, who had visited er-Ram with an interest for archaeological remains, had "a very curious stone mask... in his possession, obtained from the village. It represents a human face without hair or beard, the nose well-cut, the eyes and mouth very feebly designed. The mask is hollowed out behind, and has two deep holes at the back as if to fix it to a wall. It is over a foot in longer diameter, and curiously resembles some of the faces of the Moabite collection of Mr. Shapira. There cannot well be any question of its genuine character, and nothing like it has been found, so far as I know, in Palestine." By 2018, a total of 15 such stone masks from the Pre-Pottery Neolithic B period have been discovered in the Southern Levant, one known to have had been bought in the late 19th century from villagers in Er-Ram and now kept at the Palestine Exploration Fund in London.

Dr Thomas J. Chaplin (1830–1904) was the director of the London Society for Promoting Christianity Amongst the Jews' own British Hospital for the Jews in Jerusalem for some 25 years.

=== Crusader remains ===
Two Crusader structures have been identified in the town.

==== Tower ====
Archaeologists have identified the ruins of a Crusader courtyard building developed from an initial tower, as the grange of a Frankish new town founded by 1160.

==== Former Crusader church ====
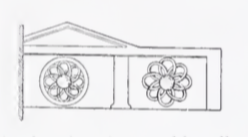
19th-century drawing of a lintel from a Crusader church, repurposed as a maqam

The former (old) mosque of Al-Ram was once a Crusader parish church.

In 1838, Robinson noted that "A small mosk with columns seems once to have been a church".

In 1870, Guérin described "a mosque, replacing a former Christian church, of which it occupies the choir; the inhabitants venerate there the memory of Shaykh Hasen. The columns of this sanctuary come from the church."

In 1881, Lieutenant Conder reported: "At the shrine which is so conspicuous near this village are remains of a former chapel. The lintel stone (as it would seem), with a bas-relief of rosettes, has been found by Dr. Chaplin within the building."

In 1883, SWP noted that "west of the village is the Mukam of Sheik Hasein, once a small Christian basilica". It further described it as "The remains of the north aisle 6 feet 8 inches wide, are marked by four columns 2 feet in diameter. The chamber of the saint's tomb occupies part of the nave, and into its north wall the lintel of the old door is built, a stone 10 feet long, half of which is visible, with designs as shown. In the courtyard east of this chamber is an old well of good water and a fine mulberry-tree. In the west wall of the Mukam other stones, with discs in low relief, are built in."

== Sister cities ==
- Zemun, Serbia
- Bondy, France – in progress since 2010

== See also ==
- Ramallah, Palestinian city few km northwest of Al-Ram

== Bibliography ==
- Barron, J.B., ed. (1923). Palestine: Report and General Abstracts of the Census of 1922. Government of Palestine.
- Conder, C.R. (1881). "Lieutenant Conder´s reports". Quarterly Statement - Palestine Exploration Fund. 13 (3): 158–208. doi:10.1179/peq.1881.13.3.158.
- Conder, C.R.; Kitchener, H.H. (1883). The Survey of Western Palestine: Memoirs of the Topography, Orography, Hydrography, and Archaeology. Vol. 3. London: Committee of the Palestine Exploration Fund.
- Government of Jordan, Department of Statistics (1964). First Census of Population and Housing. Volume I: Final Tables; General Characteristics of the Population (PDF).
- Government of Palestine, Department of Statistics (1945). Village Statistics, April, 1945.
- Guérin, V. (1874). Description Géographique Historique et Archéologique de la Palestine (in French). Vol. 2: Samarie, pt. 1. Paris: L'Imprimerie Nationale.
- Hadawi, S. (1970). Village Statistics of 1945: A Classification of Land and Area ownership in Palestine. Palestine Liberation Organization Research Center. Archived from the original on 2018-12-08.
- Hartmann, M. (1883). "Die Ortschaftenliste des Liwa Jerusalem in dem türkischen Staatskalender für Syrien auf das Jahr 1288 der Flucht (1871)". Zeitschrift des Deutschen Palästina-Vereins. 6: 102–149.
- Hütteroth, W.-D.; Abdulfattah, K. (1977). Historical Geography of Palestine, Transjordan and Southern Syria in the Late 16th Century. Erlanger Geographische Arbeiten, Sonderband 5. Erlangen, Germany: Vorstand der Fränkischen Geographischen Gesellschaft. ISBN 3-920405-41-2.
- Mills, E., ed. (1932). Census of Palestine 1931. Population of Villages, Towns and Administrative Areas. Jerusalem: Government of Palestine.
- Palmer, E. H. (1881). The Survey of Western Palestine: Arabic and English Name Lists Collected During the Survey by Lieutenants Conder and Kitchener, R. E. Transliterated and Explained by E.H. Palmer. Committee of the Palestine Exploration Fund.
- Pringle, D.; Leach, Peter (1983). "Two Medieval Villages North of Jerusalem: Archaeological Investigations in Al-Jib and Ar-Ram". Levant. 15: 141–177, pls.xvi-xxiia. doi:10.1179/lev.1983.15.1.141.
- Pringle, D. (1997). Secular buildings in the Crusader Kingdom of Jerusalem: an archaeological Gazetter. Cambridge University Press. ISBN 0521-46010-7.
- Pringle, D. (1998). The Churches of the Crusader Kingdom of Jerusalem: L-Z (excluding Tyre). Vol. II. Cambridge University Press. ISBN 0-521-39037-0.
- Robinson, E.; Smith, E. (1841). Biblical Researches in Palestine, Mount Sinai and Arabia Petraea: A Journal of Travels in the year 1838. Vol. 2. Boston: Crocker & Brewster. ( pp. 108, 114, 141)
- Röhricht, R. (1893). (RRH) Regesta regni Hierosolymitani (MXCVII-MCCXCI) (in Latin). Berlin: Libraria Academica Wageriana. (Index: p. 491: Aram (Haram), p. 504: Rama, Ramatha )
- Röhricht, R. (1904). (RRH Ad) Regesta regni Hierosolymitani Additamentum (in Latin). Berlin: Libraria Academica Wageriana. (Index: p. 129: Aram #74; p. 134: er Ram #74; Rama #30a; (Rame? #512)
- de Roziére, E., ed. (1849). Cartulaire de l'église du Saint Sépulchre de Jérusalem: publié d'après les manuscrits du Vatican (in Latin and French). Paris: Imprimerie nationale.
- Schick, C. (1896). "Zur Einwohnerzahl des Bezirks Jerusalem". Zeitschrift des Deutschen Palästina-Vereins. 19: 120–127.
- Socin, A. (1879). "Alphabetisches Verzeichniss von Ortschaften des Paschalik Jerusalem". Zeitschrift des Deutschen Palästina-Vereins. 2: 135–163.
- Toledano, E. (1984). "The Sanjaq of Jerusalem in the Sixteenth Century: Aspects of Topography and Population". Archivum Ottomanicum. 9: 279–319. Archived from the original on 2016-03-05.
- Wilson, C.W., ed. (c. 1881). Picturesque Palestine, Sinai and Egypt. Vol. 1. New York: D. Appleton.
