= 2021 AFC Cup group stage =

Sporting event

The 2021 AFC Cup group stage was played from 14 May to 24 August 2021. A total of 38 teams should have competed in the group stage to decide the 12 places in the knockout stage of the 2021 AFC Cup.

== Draw ==
The draw for the group stage was held on 27 January 2021, 14:30 MYT (UTC+8), at the AFC House in Kuala Lumpur, Malaysia. The 38 teams were drawn into nine groups of four and one group of three (in the Central Asia Zone): three groups each in the West Asia Zone (Groups A–C) and the ASEAN Zone (Groups G–I), two groups in the Central Asia Zone (Groups E–F), and one group each in the South Asia Zone (Group D) and the East Asia Zone (Group J). For each zone, teams were seeded into four pots and drawn into the relevant positions within each group, based on their association ranking and their seeding within their association, in consideration of technical balance between groups. Teams from the same association in zones with more than one group (West Asia Zone, Central Asia Zone, and ASEAN Zone) cannot be drawn into the same group.

Originally, 39 teams entered into the group stage draw, which included the 35 direct entrants and the four winners of the play-off round of the qualifying play-offs, whose identity was not known at the time of the draw. However, after the withdrawal of teams from Oman and Myanmar, and promotion of Kaya–Iloilo to AFC Champions League group stage, only 37 teams would compete, including 34 direct entrants, one winner of the play-off round, and two winners of the preliminary round.

Zone	Groups	Pot 1	Pot 2	Pot 3	Pot 4
West Asia Zone	A–C	(Jordan) Al-Salt	(Bahrain) Al-Hidd	(Jordan) Al-Faisaly	(Bahrain) Al-Muharraq
West Asia Zone	A–C	(Lebanon) Al-Ahed	(Palestine) Markaz Shabab Al-Am'ari ( (Oman) ~~Al-Seeb~~) (Note: On 23 April 2021, the AFC announced that the two teams from Oman, Al-Seeb and Al-Nasr, withdrew from the group stage after the draw, after the suspension of all international and domestic sporting activities due to the COVID-19 pandemic in Oman. As a result, the AFC decided to cancel the play-off round match between Markaz Shabab Al-Am'ari and Al-Kuwait, and promote both teams to the group stage. Markaz Shabab Al-Am'ari would occupy position C2 (original position of Al-Seeb) and Al-Kuwait would occupy position C4 (original position of play-off round winner), while Al-Nasr (position A4) would not be replaced.)	(Lebanon) Al-Ansar	(Oman) ~~Al-Nasr~~
West Asia Zone	A–C	(Syria) Tishreen	(Palestine) Markaz Balata	(Syria) Al-Wahda	Al-Kuwait; ~~(Winners of Play-off West Asia)~~
South Asia Zone	D	(India) ATK Mohun Bagan	(Bangladesh) Bashundhara Kings	(Maldives) Maziya	(India) Bengaluru (Winners of Play-off South Asia)
Central Asia Zone	E–F	(Uzbekistan) Nasaf ~~(AGMK)~~ (Note: The standby teams would replace a team from the same association which played in the AFC Champions League qualifying play-offs and advanced to the AFC Champions League group stage. Since AGMK advanced from the AFC Champions League qualifying play-offs to the group stage, Nasaf, which were the standby team from Uzbekistan, replaced AGMK in the AFC Cup group stage. There is no standby team from Philippines (for Kaya–Iloilo))	(Turkmenistan) Altyn Asyr	(Tajikistan) Khujand	(Kyrgyzstan) Alay
Central Asia Zone	E–F	(Tajikistan) Ravshan Kulob	(Kyrgyzstan) Dordoi	(Turkmenistan) Ahal	—N/a
ASEAN Zone	G–I	(Cambodia) Visakha ( (Philippines) ~~Kaya–Iloilo~~)	(Singapore) Lion City Sailors	(Cambodia) Boeung Ket	(Singapore) Geylang International
ASEAN Zone	G–I	(Vietnam) Hà Nội	(Timor-Leste) Lalenok United (~~Winners of Preliminary ASEAN 2.2~~) ( (Myanmar) ~~Shan United~~) (Note: On 30 April 2021, the AFC announced that the two teams from Myanmar, Shan United and Hanthawady United, withdrew from the group stage and play-off stage respectively after the draw, due to the state of emergency caused by the 2021 Myanmar coup d'état. As a result, the AFC decided to cancel the two play-off round matches, and promote Persipura Jayapura and the two preliminary stage winners to the group stage. Persipura Jayapura would occupy position H4 (original position of play-off round winner 2), the preliminary round winner 1 would occupy position G4 (original position of play-off round winner 1), and the preliminary round winner 2 would occupy position I2 (original position of Shan United).)	(Vietnam) Sài Gòn	TBD (Winners of Preliminary ASEAN 2.1); ~~(Winners of Play-off ASEAN 1)~~
ASEAN Zone	G–I	(Malaysia) Kedah	(Indonesia) Bali United	(Malaysia) Terengganu	(Indonesia) Persipura Jayapura; ~~(Winners of Play-off ASEAN 2)~~
East Asia Zone	J	(Hong Kong) Eastern	(Chinese Taipei) Tainan City	(Mongolia) Athletic 220	(Hong Kong) Lee Man

Standby teams

- (Myanmar) ~~Ayeyawady United (for Shan United)~~

== Format ==
In the group stage, each group was played on a single round-robin basis in centralised venues. The following teams advanced to the knockout stage:

- The winners of each group and the best runners-up in the West Asia Zone and the ASEAN Zone advanced to the Zonal semi-finals.
- The winners of each group in the Central Asia Zone advanced to the Zonal finals.
- The winners of each group in the South Asia Zone and the East Asia Zone advanced to the Inter-zone play-off semi-finals.

=== Tiebreakers ===
The teams were ranked according to points (3 points for a win, 1 point for a draw, 0 points for a loss). If tied on points, tiebreakers were applied in the following order (Regulations Article 8.3):

1. Points in head-to-head matches among tied teams;
2. Goal difference in head-to-head matches among tied teams;
3. Goals scored in head-to-head matches among tied teams;
4. ~~Away goals scored in head-to-head matches among tied teams~~; (not applicable since the matches were played in a centralised venue)
5. If more than two teams are tied, and after applying all head-to-head criteria above, a subset of teams are still tied, all head-to-head criteria above are reapplied exclusively to this subset of teams;
6. Goal difference in all group matches;
7. Goals scored in all group matches;
8. Penalty shoot-out if only two teams playing each other in the last round of the group are tied;
9. Disciplinary points (yellow card = 1 point, red card as a result of two yellow cards = 3 points, direct red card = 3 points, yellow card followed by direct red card = 4 points);
10. Association ranking;
11. Drawing of lots.

== Schedule ==
The schedule of each matchday was as follows.

Matchday	Dates					Matches	
Matchday	West Asia	Central Asia	South Asia	ASEAN	East Asia	Four-team groups	Three-team group
Matchday 1	21 May 2021	14 May 2021	18 August 2021	Cancelled	23 June 2021	Team 1 vs. Team 4, Team 2 vs. Team 3	Team 3 vs. Team 1
Matchday 2	24 May 2021	17 May 2021	21 August 2021	Cancelled	26 June 2021	Team 4 vs. Team 2, Team 3 vs. Team 1	Team 2 vs. Team 3
Matchday 3	27 May 2021	20 May 2021	24 August 2021	Cancelled	29 June 2021	Team 1 vs. Team 2, Team 3 vs. Team 4	Team 1 vs. Team 2

=== Centralised venues ===
On 1 March 2021, AFC confirmed the hosts for the group stage, except for Group G whose hosts were decided later.

- Group A: Arad, Bahrain (Al Muharraq Stadium)
- Group B: Amman, Jordan (King Abdullah II Stadium)
- Group C: Amman, Jordan (Amman International Stadium)
- Group D: Malé, Maldives (National Football Stadium)
- Group E: Bishkek, Kyrgyzstan (Dolen Omurzakov Stadium)
- Group F: Dushanbe, Tajikistan (Pamir Stadium)
- Group J: Hong Kong (Hong Kong Stadium & Tseung Kwan O Sports Ground)

== Groups ==
=== Group A ===
Pos	Team	Pld	W	D	L	GF	GA	GD	Pts	Qualification	AHE	WAH	HID
1	(Lebanon) Al-Ahed	2	1	1	0	2	1	+1	4	Zonal semi-finals	—	—	2–1
2	(Syria) Al-Wahda	2	0	2	0	1	1	0	2		0–0	—	—
3	(Bahrain) Al-Hidd (H)	2	0	1	1	2	3	−1	1		—	1–1	—

Source: AFC
Rules for classification: Tiebreakers
(H) Hosts
21 May 2021
20:05 UTC+3

Al-Wahda (Syria)	0–0	(Lebanon) Al-Ahed
	Live Report; Stats Report

Al Muharraq Stadium, Arad
Attendance: 0
Referee: Seyed Vahid Kazemi (Iran)

24 May 2021
20:05 UTC+3

Al-Hidd (Bahrain)	1–1	(Syria) Al-Wahda
Al-Shamrani 48'	Live Report; Stats Report	Omari 45+5' (pen.)

Al Muharraq Stadium, Arad
Attendance: 0
Referee: Kim Hee-gon (South Korea)

27 May 2021
20:05 UTC+3

Al-Hidd (Bahrain)	1–2	(Lebanon) Al-Ahed
Yaser 85'	Live Report; Stats Report	Al Wakid 36'; Mansour 89'

Al Muharraq Stadium, Arad
Attendance: 0
Referee: Sadullo Gulmurodi (Tajikistan)

=== Group B ===
Pos	Team	Pld	W	D	L	GF	GA	GD	Pts	Qualification	MUH	SAL	ANS	MBA
1	(Bahrain) Al-Muharraq	3	2	0	1	6	4	+2	6 (Note: Head-to-head points: Al-Muharraq 3, Al-Salt 0.)	Zonal semi-finals	—	—	—	2–3
2	(Jordan) Al-Salt (H)	3	2	0	1	7	2	+5	6	Zonal semi-finals	0–1	—	—	5–0
3	(Lebanon) Al-Ansar	3	1	0	2	4	5	−1	3 (Note: Head-to-head points: Al-Ansar 3, Markaz Balata 0.)		1–3	1–2	—	—
4	(Palestine) Markaz Balata	3	1	0	2	3	9	−6	3		—	—	0–2	—

Source: AFC
Rules for classification: Tiebreakers
(H) Hosts
Notes:
21 May 2021
16:00 UTC+3

Al-Salt (Jordan)	0–1	(Bahrain) Al-Muharraq
	Live Report; Stats Report	Abdullatif 42'

King Abdullah II Stadium, Amman
Attendance: 0
Referee: Mongkolchai Pechsri (Thailand)
21 May 2021
20:05 UTC+3

Markaz Balata (Palestine)	0–2	(Lebanon) Al-Ansar
	Live Report; Stats Report	Kojok 62'; Maatouk 90+5'

King Abdullah II Stadium, Amman
Attendance: 0
Referee: Nivon Robesh Gamini (Sri Lanka)

24 May 2021
16:00 UTC+3

Al-Muharraq (Bahrain)	2–3	(Palestine) Markaz Balata
Arnaout 23'; Abdulrahman 66'	Live Report; Stats Report	Salem 45+1', 55', 71'

King Abdullah II Stadium, Amman
Attendance: 0
Referee: Chen Hsin-chuan (Chinese Taipei)
24 May 2021
20:05 UTC+3

Al-Salt (Jordan)	2–1	(Lebanon) Al-Ansar
Al Daoud 20'; Ngah 90' (pen.)	Live Report; Stats Report	Maatouk 45+2' (pen.)

King Abdullah II Stadium, Amman
Attendance: 0
Referee: Nasrullo Kabirov (Tajikistan)

27 May 2021
16:00 UTC+3

Al-Ansar (Lebanon)	1–3	(Bahrain) Al-Muharraq
Maatouk 17'	Live Report; Stats Report	Saleh 40'; Abdullatif 44'; Tiago Real 81'

King Abdullah II Stadium, Amman
Attendance: 0
Referee: Mohammed Al-Hoish (Saudi Arabia)
27 May 2021
20:05 UTC+3

Al-Salt (Jordan)	5–0	(Palestine) Markaz Balata
Ngah 4', 19', 55'; Abu-Abed 45'; Israiwah 72'	Live Report; Stats Report

King Abdullah II Stadium, Amman
Attendance: 0
Referee: Nivon Robesh Gamini (Sri Lanka)

=== Group C ===
Pos	Team	Pld	W	D	L	GF	GA	GD	Pts	Qualification	KSC	FAI	TIS	MSA
1	Al-Kuwait	3	2	1	0	8	4	+4	7	Zonal semi-finals	—	—	—	4–1
2	(Jordan) Al-Faisaly (H)	3	2	0	1	3	1	+2	6		0–1	—	1–0	—
3	(Syria) Tishreen	3	1	1	1	8	5	+3	4		3–3	—	—	5–1
4	(Palestine) Markaz Shabab Al-Am'ari	3	0	0	3	2	11	−9	0		—	0–2	—	—

Source: AFC
Rules for classification: Tiebreakers
(H) Hosts
21 May 2021
16:00 UTC+3

Tishreen (Syria)	3–3	Kuwait SC
Sabagh 31'; Marmour 71' (pen.); Malta 90+8'	Live Report; Stats Report	Akaïchi 23'; Al-Harbi 61', 74'

Amman International Stadium, Amman
Attendance: 0
Referee: Bijan Heidari (Iran)
21 May 2021
20:05 UTC+3

Al-Faisaly (Jordan)	2–0	(Palestine) Markaz Shabab Al-Am'ari
Zahran 12'; Ersan 75'	Live Report; Stats Report

Amman International Stadium, Amman
Attendance: 0
Referee: Mohammed Al-Hoish (Saudi Arabia)

24 May 2021
16:00 UTC+3

Kuwait SC	4–1	(Palestine) Markaz Shabab Al-Am'ari
Akaïchi 74' (pen.), 81'; Al Sanea 87'; Nasser 90+1' (pen.)	Live Report; Stats Report	Abuhabib 17'

Amman International Stadium, Amman
Attendance: 0
Referee: Kim Woo-sung (South Korea)
24 May 2021
20:05 UTC+3

Al-Faisaly (Jordan)	1–0	(Syria) Tishreen
Jalboush 83'	Live Report; Stats Report

Amman International Stadium, Amman
Attendance: 0
Referee: Yaqoob Abdul Baki (Oman)

27 May 2021
16:00 UTC+3

Al-Faisaly (Jordan)	0–1	Kuwait SC
	Live Report; Stats Report	Akaïchi 47'

Amman International Stadium, Amman
Attendance: 0
Referee: Mongkolchai Pechsri (Thailand)
27 May 2021
20:05 UTC+3

Tishreen (Syria)	5–1	(Palestine) Markaz Shabab Al-Am'ari
Krouma 17', 53'; Mustafa 39' (pen.); Koaeh 57'; Marmour 67'	Live Report; Stats Report	Maraaba 70'

Amman International Stadium, Amman
Attendance: 0
Referee: Halim Aqa Shirzad (Afghanistan)

=== Group D ===
Pos	Team	Pld	W	D	L	GF	GA	GD	Pts	Qualification	MBSG	BSK	BFC	MAZ
1	(India) ATK Mohun Bagan	3	2	1	0	6	2	+4	7	Inter-zone play-off semi-finals	—	1–1	2–0	—
2	(Bangladesh) Bashundhara Kings	3	1	2	0	3	1	+2	5		—	—	—	2–0
3	(India) Bengaluru	3	1	1	1	6	4	+2	4		—	0−0	—	—
4	(Maldives) Maziya (H)	3	0	0	3	3	11	−8	0		1–3	—	2–6	—

Source: AFC
Rules for classification: Tiebreakers
(H) Hosts
18 August 2021
16:00 UTC+5

ATK Mohun Bagan (India)	2−0	(India) Bengaluru
Krishna 39'; Bose 46'	Live Report; Stats Report

National Football Stadium, Malé
Attendance: 0
Referee: Mohammad Arafah (Jordan)
18 August 2021
21:00 UTC+5

Bashundhara Kings (Bangladesh)	2–0	(Maldives) Maziya
Irufaan 25' (o.g.); Robinho 40'	Live Report; Stats Report

National Football Stadium, Malé
Attendance: 0
Referee: Ali Reda (Lebanon)

21 August 2021
16:00 UTC+5

Bengaluru (India)	0−0	(Bangladesh) Bashundhara Kings
	Live Report; Stats Report

National Football Stadium, Malé
Attendance: 0
Referee: Thoriq Alkatiri (Indonesia)
21 August 2021
21:00 UTC+5

Maziya (Maldives)	1−3	(India) ATK Mohun Bagan
Ibrahim 25'	Live Report; Stats Report	Colaco 48'; Krishna 63'; M. Singh 77'

National Football Stadium, Malé
Attendance: 0
Referee: Tam Ping Wun (Hong Kong)

24 August 2021
16:00 UTC+5

ATK Mohun Bagan (India)	1–1	(Bangladesh) Bashundhara Kings
Williams 62'	Live Report; Stats Report	Fernandes 28'

National Football Stadium, Malé
Attendance: 0
Referee: Qasim Al-Hatmi (Oman)
24 August 2021
21:00 UTC+5

Maziya (Maldives)	2–6	(India) Bengaluru
Mohamed 67'; Abdulla 82'	Live Report; Stats Report	U. Singh 6'; Silva 19'; Augustine 36'; Narayanan 70'; B. Singh 85', 90+2'

National Football Stadium, Malé
Attendance: 0
Referee: Thoriq Alkatiri (Indonesia)

=== Group E ===
Pos	Team	Pld	W	D	L	GF	GA	GD	Pts	Qualification	AHA	DOR	RAV
1	(Turkmenistan) Ahal	2	2	0	0	5	1	+4	6	Zonal finals	—	—	3–1
2	(Kyrgyzstan) Dordoi (H)	2	1	0	1	3	2	+1	3		0–2	—	—
3	(Tajikistan) Ravshan Kulob	2	0	0	2	1	6	−5	0		—	0–3	—

Source: AFC
Rules for classification: Tiebreakers
(H) Hosts
14 May 2021
20:00 UTC+6

Ahal (Turkmenistan)	3–1	(Tajikistan) Ravshan Kulob
Tagaýew 14', 18'; Annaýew 63'	Live Report; Stats Report	Shomurodov 52' (pen.)

Dolen Omurzakov Stadium, Bishkek
Attendance: 0
Referee: Shukri Al-Hunfush (Saudi Arabia)

17 May 2021
20:00 UTC+6

Dordoi (Kyrgyzstan)	0–2	(Turkmenistan) Ahal
	Live Report; Stats Report	Mishchenko 7' (o.g.); Tagaýew 78'

Dolen Omurzakov Stadium, Bishkek
Attendance: 0
Referee: Zaid Thamer (Iraq)

20 May 2021
20:00 UTC+6

Ravshan Kulob (Tajikistan)	0–3	(Kyrgyzstan) Dordoi
	Live Report; Stats Report	Kojo 16'; Bokoleyev 40', 83'

Dolen Omurzakov Stadium, Bishkek
Attendance: 0
Referee: Razlan Joffri Ali (Malaysia)

=== Group F ===
Pos	Team	Pld	W	D	L	GF	GA	GD	Pts	Qualification	NAS	ALT	KHU	ALA
1	(Uzbekistan) Nasaf	3	3	0	0	9	0	+9	9	Zonal finals	—	2–0	—	4–0
2	(Turkmenistan) Altyn Asyr	3	1	1	1	7	8	−1	4		—	—	2–2	—
3	(Tajikistan) Khujand (H)	3	1	1	1	4	5	−1	4		0–3	—	—	2–0
4	(Kyrgyzstan) Alay	3	0	0	3	4	11	−7	0		—	4–5	—	—

Source: AFC
Rules for classification: Tiebreakers
(H) Hosts
14 May 2021
17:00 UTC+5

Nasaf (Uzbekistan)	4–0	(Kyrgyzstan) Alay
Nurulloev 52'; Komilov 58'; Norchaev 64'; Aliqulov 75'	Live Report; Stats Report

Pamir Stadium, Dushanbe
Attendance: 800
Referee: Mahmood Al-Majarafi (Oman)
14 May 2021
21:05 UTC+5

Altyn Asyr (Turkmenistan)	2–2	(Tajikistan) Khujand
Annadurdyýew 15', 44'	Live Report; Stats Report	Serdyuk 25'; Bozorov 41'

Pamir Stadium, Dushanbe
Attendance: 4,100
Referee: Omar Mohamed Al-Ali (United Arab Emirates)

17 May 2021
17:00 UTC+5

Alay (Kyrgyzstan)	4–5	(Turkmenistan) Altyn Asyr
Mambetaliev 29'; Annagulyýew 72' (o.g.); Tursunow 84' (o.g.); Nurlan 90'	Live Report; Stats Report	Abdugafforov 2' (o.g.); Annadurdyýew 41' (pen.), 90+3' (pen.); Ylýasow 44'; Titow 48'

Pamir Stadium, Dushanbe
Attendance: 400
Referee: Clifford Daypuyat (Philippines)
17 May 2021
21:05 UTC+5

Khujand (Tajikistan)	0–3	(Uzbekistan) Nasaf
	Live Report; Stats Report	Mozgovoy 10'; Aliqulov 42'; Nasrullayev 45+1'

Pamir Stadium, Dushanbe
Attendance: 2,500
Referee: Ahmad Al-Ali (Kuwait)

20 May 2021
17:00 UTC+5

Nasaf (Uzbekistan)	2–0	(Turkmenistan) Altyn Asyr
Komilov 27'; Norchaev 35'	Live Report; Stats Report

Pamir Stadium, Dushanbe
Attendance: 750
Referee: Mahmood Al-Majarafi (Oman)
20 May 2021
21:05 UTC+5

Khujand (Tajikistan)	2–0	(Kyrgyzstan) Alay
Bozorov 27'; Zabirov 50'	Live Report; Stats Report

Pamir Stadium, Dushanbe
Attendance: 4,300
Referee: Baraa Aisha (Palestine)

=== Group G (cancelled) ===
Pos	Team	Pld	W	D	L	GF	GA	GD	Pts	HAN	BAL	BOE	G4
1	(Vietnam) Hanoi	0	0	0	0	0	0	0	0	—	Cancelled	—	Cancelled
2	(Indonesia) Bali United	0	0	0	0	0	0	0	0	—	—	Cancelled	—
3	(Cambodia) Boeung Ket	0	0	0	0	0	0	0	0	Cancelled	—	—	Cancelled
4	Winners of ASEAN 2.1	0	0	0	0	0	0	0	0	—	Cancelled	—	—

Source: AFC
Rules for classification: Tiebreakers

Hanoi (Vietnam)	Cancelled	Winners of ASEAN 2.1
	Stats Report

Bali United (Indonesia)	Cancelled	(Cambodia) Boeung Ket
	Stats Report

Winners of ASEAN 2.1	Cancelled	(Indonesia) Bali United
	Stats Report

Boeung Ket (Cambodia)	Cancelled	(Vietnam) Hanoi
	Stats Report

Hanoi (Vietnam)	Cancelled	(Indonesia) Bali United
	Stats Report

Boeung Ket (Cambodia)	Cancelled	Winners of ASEAN 2.1
	Stats Report

=== Group H (cancelled) ===
Pos	Team	Pld	W	D	L	GF	GA	GD	Pts	KED	LIO	SGN	PPR
1	(Malaysia) Kedah Darul Aman	0	0	0	0	0	0	0	0	—	Cancelled	—	Cancelled
2	(Singapore) Lion City Sailors	0	0	0	0	0	0	0	0	—	—	Cancelled	—
3	(Vietnam) Saigon	0	0	0	0	0	0	0	0	Cancelled	—	—	Cancelled
4	(Indonesia) Persipura Jayapura	0	0	0	0	0	0	0	0	—	Cancelled	—	—

Source: AFC
Rules for classification: Tiebreakers

Kedah Darul Aman (Malaysia)	Cancelled	(Indonesia) Persipura Jayapura
	Stats Report

Lion City Sailors (Singapore)	Cancelled	(Vietnam) Saigon
	Stats Report

Persipura Jayapura (Indonesia)	Cancelled	(Singapore) Lion City Sailors
	Stats Report

Saigon (Vietnam)	Cancelled	(Malaysia) Kedah Darul Aman
	Stats Report

Kedah Darul Aman (Malaysia)	Cancelled	(Singapore) Lion City Sailors
	Stats Report

Saigon (Vietnam)	Cancelled	(Indonesia) Persipura Jayapura
	Stats Report

=== Group I (cancelled) ===
Pos	Team	Pld	W	D	L	GF	GA	GD	Pts	VIS	LAL	TER	GEY
1	(Cambodia) Visakha	0	0	0	0	0	0	0	0	—	Cancelled	—	Cancelled
2	(Timor-Leste) Lalenok United	0	0	0	0	0	0	0	0	—	—	Cancelled	—
3	(Malaysia) Terengganu	0	0	0	0	0	0	0	0	Cancelled	—	—	Cancelled
4	(Singapore) Geylang International	0	0	0	0	0	0	0	0	—	Cancelled	—	—

Source: AFC
Rules for classification: Tiebreakers

Visakha (Cambodia)	Cancelled	(Singapore) Geylang International

Lalenok United (Timor-Leste)	Cancelled	(Malaysia) Terengganu

Geylang International (Singapore)	Cancelled	(Timor-Leste) Lalenok United

Terengganu (Malaysia)	Cancelled	(Cambodia) Visakha

Visakha (Cambodia)	Cancelled	(Timor-Leste) Lalenok United

Terengganu (Malaysia)	Cancelled	(Singapore) Geylang International
	Stats Report

=== Group J ===
Pos	Team	Pld	W	D	L	GF	GA	GD	Pts	Qualification	LEE	EAS	TNC	ATH
1	(Hong Kong) Lee Man (H)	3	3	0	0	10	2	+8	9	Inter-zone play-off finals (Note: After matches in ASEAN Zone was cancelled, there are only three teams which qualified to the Inter-zone play-off semi-finals, i.e., the winners of the South Asia Zone (Group D), the winners of the East Asia Zone (Group J), and the winners of the Central Zonal final. The three Zonal champions will be drawn into two pairings where one club will get a bye to the Inter-zone play-off final, which happened for Lee Man.)	—	—	4–1	—
2	(Hong Kong) Eastern (H)	3	2	0	1	2	1	+1	6		0–1	—	1–0	—
3	(Chinese Taipei) Tainan City	3	1	0	2	4	5	−1	3		—	—	—	3–0
4	(Mongolia) Athletic 220	3	0	0	3	1	9	−8	0		1–5	0–1	—	—

Source: AFC
Rules for classification: Tiebreakers
(H) Hosts
23 June 2021
16:00 UTC+8

Tainan City (Chinese Taipei)	3–0	(Mongolia) Athletic 220
Chen Jui-chieh 32', 83'; Batkhishig 87' (o.g.)	Live Report; Stats Report

Tseung Kwan O Sports Ground, Hong Kong
Attendance: 183
Referee: Feras Taweel (Syria)
23 June 2021
20:00 UTC+8

Eastern (Hong Kong)	0–1	(Hong Kong) Lee Man
	Live Report; Stats Report	Gil 26'

Hong Kong Stadium, Hong Kong
Attendance: 2,326
Referee: Payam Heydari (Iran)

26 June 2021
16:00 UTC+8

Athletic 220 (Mongolia)	0–1	(Hong Kong) Eastern
	Live Report; Stats Report	Lee Ka Yiu 55'

Hong Kong Stadium, Hong Kong
Attendance: 1,004
Referee: Abdul Hakim Haidi (Brunei Darussalam)
26 June 2021
20:00 UTC+8

Lee Man (Hong Kong)	4–1	(Chinese Taipei) Tainan City
José Ángel 7'; Acosta 10'; Kim Seung-yong 11'; Nakamura 90+3'	Live Report; Stats Report	Estama 86'

Tseung Kwan O Sports Ground, Hong Kong
Attendance: 2,107
Referee: Ali Abdulnabi (Bahrain)

29 June 2021
20:00 UTC+8

Athletic 220 (Mongolia)	1–5	(Hong Kong) Lee Man
Naranbold 90+1'	Live Report; Stats Report	Wong Ho Chun 2'; Lee Hong Lim 15' (pen.), 53'; Gil 69', 72'

Tseung Kwan O Sports Ground, Hong Kong
Attendance: 1,621
Referee: Payam Heydari (Iran)
29 June 2021
20:00 UTC+8

Eastern (Hong Kong)	1–0	(Chinese Taipei) Tainan City
J. Lum 77' (pen.)	Live Report; Stats Report

Hong Kong Stadium, Hong Kong
Attendance: 945
Referee: Ali Abdulnabi (Bahrain)

== Ranking of runner-up teams ==
=== West Asia Zone ===
As Group A only had three teams, the results against fourth-placed teams in Groups B and C were not considered in this ranking.

Pos	Grp	Team	Pld	W	D	L	GF	GA	GD	Pts	Qualification
1	B	(Jordan) Al-Salt	2	1	0	1	2	2	0	3	Zonal semi-finals
2	C	(Jordan) Al-Faisaly	2	1	0	1	1	1	0	3	
3	A	(Syria) Al-Wahda	2	0	2	0	1	1	0	2	

Source: AFC
Rules for classification: 1) Points; 2) Goal difference; 3) Goals scored; 4) Disciplinary points; 5) Drawing of lots.

=== ASEAN Zone (Cancelled) ===
Pos	Grp	Team	Pld	W	D	L	GF	GA	GD	Pts
1	G	G2	0	0	0	0	0	0	0	0
2	H	H2	0	0	0	0	0	0	0	0
3	I	I2	0	0	0	0	0	0	0	0

Source: AFC
Rules for classification: 1) Points; 2) Goal difference; 3) Goals scored; 4) Disciplinary points; 5) Drawing of lots.
