= 2019–20 West Bank Premier League =

West Bank Premier League
- Season: 2019–20
- Champions: Markaz Balata
- Relegated: Ahli Qalqilyah; Al-Quwaat Al-Falistinia
- AFC Cup: Markaz Balata
- Matches: 132
- Goals: 369 (2.8 per match)
- Top goalscorer: Mohammed Maaraba (18 goals)
- Biggest home win: Hilal Al-Quds 6–0 Wadi Al-Nes (21 December 2019)
- Biggest away win: Ahli Qalqilyah 0–6 Al-Bireh Institute (29 February 2020); Al-Falistinia 0–6 Shabab Al-Am'ari (16 June 2020)
- Highest scoring: Markaz Balata 5–3 Jabal Al-Mukaber (13 March 2020)
- Longest winning run: 6 games Markaz Balata
- Longest unbeaten run: 15 games Markaz Balata
- Longest losing run: 12 games Al-Falistinia

The 2019–20 West Bank Premier League is the 17th season of the West Bank Premier League, the top football league in the West Bank of Palestine. The season started on 26 September 2019.

== Teams ==
=== Team location ===
Location football club of Gaza Premier League

=== Pre-season ===
A total of 12 teams compete in the league. Markaz Balata are the defending champions. Shabab Al-Dhahiriya and Markaz Tulkarem were relegated from last season, and were replaced by promoted teams Ahli Qalqilyah and Al-Quwaat Al-Falistinia.

=== Stadia and location ===
Team	Location	Stadium	Capacity
Ahli Al-Khaleel	Hebron	Hussein Bin Ali Stadium	8,000
Ahli Qalqilyah	Qalqilya		
Al-Bireh Institute	Al-Bireh	Faisal Al-Husseini International Stadium	12,500
Al-Quwaat Al-Falistinia			
Hilal Al-Quds	Al-Ram	Faisal Al-Husseini International Stadium	12,500
Jabal Al-Mukaber	Al-Ram	Faisal Al-Husseini International Stadium	12,500
Markaz Balata	Nablus	Nablus Football Stadium	4,000
Shabab Al-Am'ari	Al-Ram	Faisal Al-Husseini International Stadium	12,500
Shabab Al-Khalil	Hebron	Hussein Bin Ali Stadium	8,000
Shabab Al-Samu	Hebron	Hussein Bin Ali Stadium	8,000
Taraji Wadi Al-Nes	Wadi Al-Nes	Al-Khader Stadium	6,000
Thaqafi Tulkarem	Tulkarm	Jamal Ghanem Stadium	4,000

== League table ==
Pos	Team	Pld	W	D	L	GF	GA	GD	Pts	Qualification or relegation
1	Markaz Balata (C)	22	15	6	1	50	18	+32	51	Qualification for AFC Cup Group Stage
2	Markaz Shabab Al-Am'ari	22	12	8	2	43	17	+26	44	Qualification for AFC Cup play-off round
3	Ahli Al-Khaleel	22	12	5	5	31	20	+11	41	
4	Shabab Al-Khalil	22	10	6	6	39	24	+15	36	
5	Hilal Al-Quds	22	9	7	6	31	22	+9	34	
6	Al-Bireh Institute	22	8	9	5	30	23	+7	33	
7	Shabab Al-Samu	22	9	5	8	36	29	+7	32	
8	Jabal Mukabar	22	7	6	9	33	35	−2	27	
9	Taraji Wadi Al-Nes	22	6	6	10	23	35	−12	24	
10	Thaqafi Tulkarem	22	3	8	11	21	31	−10	17	
11	Ahli Qalqilyah (R)	22	2	8	12	22	47	−25	14	Relegation to West Bank First League
12	Al-Quwaat Al-Falistinia (R)	22	0	4	18	10	68	−58	4	Relegation to West Bank First League

Updated to match(es) played on 23 June 2020. Source: Soccerway
Rules for classification: 1) Points; 2) Goal difference; 3) Goals scored;
(C) Champions; (R) Relegated

== See also ==
- 2019–20 Gaza Strip Premier League
- 2019–20 Palestine Cup
