= 2021 AFC Cup =

Association football tournament

Tournament details
- Dates: Qualifying: 7 April – 15 August; Competition proper: 14 May – 5 November
- Teams: Group stage: 38 (originally); Total: 43 (from 27 associations)

Final positions
- Champions: (Bahrain) Al-Muharraq (2nd title)
- Runners-up: (Uzbekistan) Nasaf

Tournament statistics
- Matches played: 43
- Goals scored: 138 (3.21 per match)
- Attendance: 65,676 (1,527 per match)
- Top scorer(s): (Uzbekistan) Khusayin Norchaev (7 goals)
- Best player: (Bahrain) Abdulwahab Al-Malood
- (Note: All statistics do not include qualifying play-offs)

The 2021 AFC Cup was the 18th edition of the AFC Cup, Asia's secondary club football tournament organized by the Asian Football Confederation (AFC).

The winners of the tournament automatically qualified for the 2022 AFC Champions League, entering the qualifying play-offs, if they had not qualified through their domestic performance.

Lebanese club Al-Ahed, having won their first AFC Cup title in 2019, were the title holders, since the 2020 edition was cancelled due to the COVID-19 pandemic in Asia after several group stage matches and the title was not awarded. However, Al-Ahed were eliminated by the eventual winners Al-Muharraq in the West Asia Zonal semi-finals.

== Association team allocation ==
The 46 AFC member associations (excluding the Northern Mariana Islands, which became a full member in December 2020 and are not eligible for this season) are ranked based on their clubs' performance over the last four years in AFC competitions (their national team's FIFA World Rankings no longer considered). The slots are allocated by the following criteria according to the Entry Manual:

- The associations are split into five zones (Article 5.1):
  - West Asia Zone consists of the 12 associations from the West Asian Football Federation (WAFF).
  - South Asia Zone consists of the 7 associations from the South Asian Football Federation (SAFF).
  - Central Asia Zone consists of the 6 associations from Central Asian Football Association (CAFA).
  - ASEAN Zone consists of the 12 associations from the ASEAN Football Federation (AFF).
  - East Asia Zone consists of the 9 associations from the East Asian Football Federation (EAFF).
  - The AFC may reallocate one or more associations to another zone if necessary for sporting reasons.
- Excluding the top five associations in each region for AFC Champions League slot allocation, all other associations are eligible to enter the AFC Cup.
- The teams from associations ranked 6th, 11th and 12th which are eliminated in the AFC Champions League qualifying play-offs enter the AFC Cup group stage (Article 3.2). The following rules are applied:
  - The associations ranked 6th in both the West Region and the East Region, while allocated one direct slot in the AFC Cup group stage without taking away any direct slot from other associations, are not ranked in each zone for AFC Cup slot allocation (Article 5.3).
  - If they advance to the AFC Champions League group stage, the AFC Cup group stage slot is filled by the standby team from their association if such team are available (Article 5.12).
  - The rules above do not apply to the AFC Champions League title holders and AFC Cup title holders which are allocated AFC Champions League play-off slots should they not qualify for the tournament through domestic performance.
- In the West Asia Zone and the ASEAN Zone, there are three groups in the group stage, including 9 direct slots, with the 3 remaining slots filled through qualifying play-offs (Article 5.2). The slots in each zone are distributed as follows:
  - The associations ranked 1st to 3rd are each allocated two direct slots.
  - The associations ranked 4th to 6th are each allocated one direct slot and one play-off slot.
  - The associations ranked 7th or below are each allocated get one play-off slot.
  - If any zone has an association ranked 6th for AFC Champions League slot allocation, which is allocated one direct slot in the AFC Cup group stage, there are 10 direct slots, with the 2 remaining slots filled through qualifying play-offs.
- In the South Asia Zone, the Central Asia Zone, and the East Asia Zone, there is one group in the group stage, including 3 direct slots, with the 1 remaining slot filled through qualifying play-offs (Article 5.2). The slots in each zone are distributed as follows:
  - The associations ranked 1st to 3rd are each allocated one direct slot and one play-off slot.
  - The associations ranked 4th or below are each allocated one play-off slot.
  - If any zone has an association ranked 6th for AFC Champions League slot allocation, which is allocated one direct slot in the AFC Cup group stage, there are 4 direct slots, and to ensure equal opportunity in each zone, another group is added to this zone in the group stage, with the 4 remaining slots filled through qualifying play-offs (Article 5.4.1).
  - If any zone has at least 7 play-off slots, to ensure equal opportunity in each zone, another group is added to this zone in the group stage, with the 5 remaining slots filled through qualifying play-offs (Article 5.4.2).
- If any association with direct slots do not fulfill any one of the AFC Cup criteria, they have all their direct slots converted into play-off slots. The direct slots given up are redistributed to the highest eligible association by the following criteria (Articles 5.7 and 5.8):
  - For each association, the maximum number of total slots is two (Articles 3.4 and 3.5).
  - If any association is allocated one additional direct slot, one play-off slot is annulled and not redistributed.
- If any association with only play-off slot(s), including those mentioned above, do not fulfill the minimum AFC Cup criteria, the play-off slot(s) are annulled and not redistributed (Articles 5.10 and 5.11).
- For each association, the maximum number of total slots is one-third of the total number of eligible teams (excluding foreign teams) in the top division (Article 5.6). If this rule is applied, any direct slots given up are redistributed by the same criteria as mentioned above, and play-off slots are annulled and not redistributed (Article 9.10).
- All participating teams must be granted an AFC Champions League or AFC Cup license, and apart from cup winners, finish in the top half of their top division (Articles 7.1 and 9.5). If any association do not have enough teams which satisfy these criteria, any direct slots given up are redistributed by the same criteria as mentioned above, and play-off slots are annulled and not redistributed (Article 9.9).
- If any team granted a license refuses to participate, their slot, either direct or play-off, is annulled and not redistributed (Article 9.11).

=== Association ranking ===
For the 2021 AFC Cup, the associations are allocated slots according to their association ranking which was published on 29 November 2019, which takes into account their performance in the AFC Champions League and the AFC Cup during the period between 2016 and 2019.

Participation for 2021 AFC Cup
	Participating
	Not participating
~~(N)~~	Number of teams/associations originally entered, before withdrawal of teams from the competition after the draw

West Asia Zone (3 groups)
Rank		Member Association	Points	Slots			
Rank		Member Association	Points	Group stage	Play-off		
Zone	AFC	Member Association	Points	Group stage	Play-off round	Prelim. round 2	Prelim. round 1
1	12	Jordan	33.852	2	0	0	0
2	21	Lebanon	24.746	2	0	0	0
3	22	Syria	22.505	2	0	0	0
4	24	Bahrain	17.749	2	0	0	0
5	29	Oman	8.531	0 ~~(2)~~	0	0	0
6	30	Palestine	7.297	2 ~~(1)~~	0 ~~(1)~~	0	0
7	34	Kuwait	4.711	1 ~~(0)~~	0 ~~(1)~~	0	0
8	42	Yemen	0.000	0	0	0	0
Total		Participating associations: 6 ~~(7)~~		11	0 ~~(2)~~	0	0
Total		Participating associations: 6 ~~(7)~~		11	0 ~~(2)~~		
Total		Participating associations: 6 ~~(7)~~		11 ~~(13)~~			

South Asia Zone (1 group)
Rank		Member Association	Points	Slots			
Rank		Member Association	Points	Group stage	Play-off		
Zone	AFC	Member Association	Points	Group stage	Play-off round	Prelim. round 2	Prelim. round 1
1	15	India	29.576	1	0	1	0
2	25	Bangladesh	14.683	1	0	0 ~~(1)~~	0
3	26	Maldives	13.632	1	0	0	1
4	36	Nepal	0.915	0	0	0	1
5	37	Sri Lanka	0.618	0	0	0	1
6	38	Bhutan	0.549	0	0	0	1
7	42	Pakistan	0.000	0	0	0	0
Total		Participating associations: 6		3	0	1 ~~(2)~~	4
Total		Participating associations: 6		3	5 ~~(6)~~		
Total		Participating associations: 6		8 ~~(9)~~			

Central Asia Zone (2 groups)
Rank		Member Association	Points	Slots			
Rank		Member Association	Points	Group stage	Play-off		
Zone	AFC	Member Association	Points	Group stage	Play-off round	Prelim. round 2	Prelim. round 1
1	10	Uzbekistan	45.562	1	0	0	0
2	17	Tajikistan	28.361	2	0	0	0
3	20	Turkmenistan	26.532	2	0	0	0
4	33	Kyrgyzstan	5.466	2	0	0	0
5	41	Afghanistan	0.206	0	0	0	0
Total		Participating associations: 4		7	0	0	0
Total		Participating associations: 4		7	0		
Total		Participating associations: 4		7			

ASEAN Zone (3 groups): Final allocated slots before Zone was cancelled
Rank		Member Association	Points	Slots			
Rank		Member Association	Points	Group stage	Play-off		
Zone	AFC	Member Association	Points	Group stage	Play-off round	Prelim. round 2	Prelim. round 1
1	13	Philippines	32.130	0 ~~(1)~~	0	0	0
2	16	Vietnam	28.571	2	0	0	0
3	18	Malaysia	26.960	2	0	0	0
4	19	Singapore	26.607	2	0	0	0
5	27	Myanmar	12.756	0 ~~(1)~~	0 ~~(1)~~	0	0
6	28	Indonesia	12.550	2 ~~(1)~~	0 ~~(1)~~	0	0
7	31	Cambodia	6.770	2 ~~(1)~~	0	0 ~~(1)~~	0
8	35	Laos	2.241	0	0	1	0
9	42	Brunei	0.000	0	0	1	0
10	42	Timor-Leste	0.000	1 ~~(0)~~	0	0 ~~(1)~~	0
Total		Participating associations: 9 ~~(10)~~		11 ~~(10)~~	0 ~~(2)~~	2 ~~(4)~~	0
Total		Participating associations: 9 ~~(10)~~		11 ~~(10)~~	2 ~~(6)~~		
Total		Participating associations: 9 ~~(10)~~		13 ~~(16)~~			

East Asia Zone (1 group)
Rank		Member Association	Points	Slots			
Rank		Member Association	Points	Group stage	Play-off		
Zone	AFC	Member Association	Points	Group stage	Play-off round	Prelim. round 2	Prelim. round 1
1	14	North Korea	30.100	0	0	0	0
2	23	Hong Kong	19.945	2	0	0	0
3	32	Macau	5.489	0	0	0	0
4	39	Chinese Taipei	0.457	1	0	0	0
5	40	Mongolia	0.274	1	0	0	0
6	42	Guam	0.000	0	0	0	0
Total		Participating associations: 3		4	0	0	0
Total		Participating associations: 3		4	0		
Total		Participating associations: 3		4			

Notes

1. Afghanistan (AFG): No teams from Afghanistan were granted an AFC Cup license.
2. Bangladesh (BAN): One of the two teams from Bangladesh which originally entered the AFC Cup, Abahani Limited Dhaka, withdrew from the competition after the draw.
3. Guam (GUM): No teams from Guam were granted an AFC Cup license.
4. Macau (MAC): The two teams from Macau granted an AFC Cup license, Benfica de Macau and Chao Pak Kei, withdrew from the competition before the draw.
5. Myanmar (MYA): The two teams from Myanmar which originally entered the AFC Cup, Shan United and Hanthawaddy United, withdrew from the competition after the draw.
6. North Korea (PRK): No teams from North Korea were granted an AFC Cup license.
7. Oman (OMA): The two teams from Oman which originally entered the AFC Cup, Al-Seeb and Al-Nasr, withdrew from the competition after the draw.
8. Pakistan (PAK): No teams from Pakistan were granted an AFC Cup license.
9. Philippines (PHI): Philippines were ranked 6th in the East Region for AFC Champions League allocation, and thus were allocated one direct slot in the AFC Cup group stage without taking away any direct slot from other associations. Since Kaya F.C.–Iloilo qualified to the 2021 AFC Champions League through the play-off and no standby club to replace them, Philippines did not participate in the AFC Cup.
10. Syria (SYR): No teams from Syria were initially granted an AFC Cup license, but Tishreen and Al-Wahda were successful in their appeal.
11. Uzbekistan (UZB): Uzbekistan were ranked 6th in the West Region for AFC Champions League allocation, and thus were allocated one direct slot in the AFC Cup group stage without taking away any direct slot from other associations.
12. Yemen (YEM): No teams from Yemen were granted an AFC Cup license.

== Teams ==
Teams in italics will play in the AFC Champions League qualifying play-offs, and will play in the AFC Cup group stage if they fail to advance to the AFC Champions League group stage. Should they advance to the AFC Champions League group stage, they will not play in the AFC Cup, and will be replaced by the standby team from their association if such team are available.

West Asia ZoneGroup stage direct entrants (Groups A–C)
Team	Qualifying method	App. (last)
(Jordan) Al-Salt	2020 Jordanian Pro League fourth place	1st
(Jordan) Al-Faisaly	2020 Jordanian Pro League fifth place	11th (2020)
(Lebanon) Al-Ahed	2018–19 Lebanese Premier League champions and 2018–19 Lebanese FA Cup winners	11th (2020)
(Lebanon) Al-Ansar	2018–19 Lebanese Premier League runners-up	7th (2020)
(Syria) Tishreen	2019–20 Syrian Premier League champions	1st
(Syria) Al-Wahda	2019–20 Syrian Cup winners	8th (2018)
(Bahrain) Al-Hidd	2019–20 Bahraini Premier League champions	5th (2017)
(Bahrain) Al-Muharraq	2019–20 Bahraini King's Cup winners	7th (2017)
(Palestine) Markaz Balata	2019–20 West Bank Premier League champions	1st
(Palestine) Markaz Shabab Al-Am'ari	2019–20 West Bank Premier League runners-up	1st
Al-Kuwait	2019–20 Kuwaiti Premier League champions	10th (2020)

Withdrawn teams
Team	Qualifying method	App.
(Oman) Al-Seeb	2019–20 Oman Professional League champions	N/A
(Oman) Al-Nasr	2019–20 Oman Professional League fifth place	N/A

South Asia ZoneGroup stage direct entrants (Group D)
Team	Qualifying method	App. (last)
(India) ATK Mohun Bagan	2019–20 I-League champions	5th (2017)
(Bangladesh) Bashundhara Kings	2018–19 Bangladesh Premier League champions and 2019–20 Bangladesh Federation Cup winners	2nd (2020)
(Maldives) Maziya	2019–20 Dhivehi Premier League champions	7th (2020)

Qualifying play-off participants: Entering in preliminary round 2
Team	Qualifying method	App. (last)
(India) Bengaluru	2019–20 Indian Super League regular season third place	6th (2020)

Qualifying play-off participants: Entering in preliminary round 1
Team	Qualifying method	App. (last)
(Maldives) Eagles	2019–20 Dhivehi Premier League runners-up	1st
Nepal Army	2019–20 Martyr's Memorial A-Division League runners-up	1st
Sri Lanka Police	2019–20 Sri Lanka FA Cup winners	1st
(Bhutan) Thimphu City	2020 Bhutan Premier League champions	2nd (2017)

Withdrawn teams
Team	Qualifying method	App.
(Bangladesh) Abahani Limited Dhaka	2018–19 Bangladesh Premier League runners-up	N/A

Central Asia ZoneGroup stage direct entrants (Groups E–F)
Team	Qualifying method	App. (last)
(Uzbekistan) Nasaf	2020 Uzbekistan Super League runners-up	3rd (2011)
(Tajikistan) Ravshan Kulob	2020 Tajikistan Cup winners	3rd (2014)
(Tajikistan) Khujand	2020 Tajikistan Higher League runners-up	5th (2020)
(Turkmenistan) Altyn Asyr	2020 Ýokary Liga champions and 2020 Turkmenistan Cup winners	7th (2020)
(Turkmenistan) Ahal	2020 Ýokary Liga runners-up	4th (2019)
(Kyrgyzstan) Dordoi	2020 Kyrgyz Premier League champions	6th (2020)
(Kyrgyzstan) Alay	2020 Kyrgyzstan Cup winners	6th (2019)

ASEAN Zone (cancelled)Group stage direct entrants (Groups G–I)
Team	Qualifying method	App. (last)
(Vietnam) Hanoi	2020 Vietnamese Cup winners 2020 V.League 1 runners-up	5th (2019)
(Vietnam) Saigon	2020 V.League 1 third place	1st
(Malaysia) Kedah Darul Aman	2020 Malaysia Super League runners-up	3rd (2009)
(Malaysia) Terengganu	2020 Malaysia Super League third place	2nd (2012)
(Singapore) Lion City Sailors	2020 Singapore Premier League third place	11th (2019)
(Singapore) Geylang International	2020 Singapore Premier League fourth place	3rd (2010)
(Indonesia) Bali United	2019 Liga 1 champions	3rd (2020)
(Indonesia) Persipura Jayapura	2019 Liga 1 third place	4th (2015)
(Cambodia) Boeung Ket	2020 C-League champions	3rd (2018)
(Cambodia) Visakha	2020 Hun Sen Cup winners	1st
(Timor-Leste) Lalenok United	2020 Copa FFTL winners	2nd (2020)

Qualifying play-off participants: Entering in preliminary round 2
Team	Qualifying method	App. (last)
(Laos) Chanthabouly	2020 Lao Premier League champions	7th (2020)
(Brunei) Kasuka	2018–19 Brunei Super League runners-up	1st

Withdrawn teams
Team	Qualifying method	App.
(Myanmar) Shan United	2020 Myanmar National League champions	N/A
(Myanmar) Hanthawady United	2020 Myanmar National League runners-up	N/A

East Asia ZoneGroup stage direct entrants (Group J)
Team	Qualifying method	App. (last)
(Hong Kong) Eastern	2019–20 Hong Kong FA Cup winners 2019–20 Hong Kong Premier League runners-up	2nd (2009)
(Hong Kong) Lee Man	2019–20 Hong Kong Premier League fourth place	1st
(Chinese Taipei) Tainan City	2020 Taiwan Premier League champions	1st
(Mongolia) Athletic 220	2020 Mongolian Premier League champions	1st

Notes

1. Title holders (TH): Al-Ahed are the title holders.
2. ASEAN Zone (ASZ): On 30 April 2021, the AFC announced that the two teams from Myanmar, Shan United and Hanthawady United, withdrew from the group stage and play-off stage respectively after the draw, due to the state of emergency caused by the 2021 Myanmar coup d'état. As a result, the AFC decided to cancel the two play-off round matches, and promote Persipura Jayapura and the two preliminary stage winners to the group stage. Following the successful qualification of Kaya–Iloilo to AFC Champions League group stage, AFC decided on 6 July 2021 to promote Visakha and Lalenok United to the group stage.
3. Bangladesh (BAN): Due to the COVID-19 pandemic in Bangladesh, the 2019–20 Bangladesh Premier League was cancelled and declared null and void by the Bangladesh Football Federation. The teams from Bangladesh playing in the 2021 AFC Cup were determined by the results of the previous domestic season (2018–19 Bangladesh Premier League).
4. Brunei (BRU): Due to the COVID-19 pandemic in Brunei, the 2020 Brunei Super League was cancelled and declared null and void by the National Football Association of Brunei Darussalam, and the 2020 Brunei FA Cup was also cancelled and not organized. The team from Brunei playing in the 2021 AFC Cup were determined by the results of the previous domestic season (2018–19 Brunei Super League). MS ABDB, the 2018–19 Brunei Super League champions, were not granted an AFC Cup license. As a result, Kasuka, the best team granted an AFC Cup license (2018–19 Brunei Super League runners-up), qualified for the 2021 AFC Cup.
5. Hong Kong (HKG): R&F, the 2019–20 Hong Kong Premier League third place, withdrew from the league after the season. As a result, Lee Man, the 2019–20 Hong Kong Premier League fourth place, qualified for the 2021 AFC Cup.
6. Indonesia (IDN): Due to the COVID-19 pandemic in Indonesia, the 2020 Liga 1 and the 2020 Piala Indonesia were cancelled and declared null and void by the Football Association of Indonesia. The teams from Indonesia playing in the 2021 AFC Cup were determined by the results of the previous domestic season (2019 Liga 1 and 2018–19 Piala Indonesia). PSM Makassar, the 2018–19 Piala Indonesia winners, were not granted an AFC Cup license. As a result, Persipura Jayapura, the second best team granted an AFC Cup license (2019 Liga 1 third place), qualified for the 2021 AFC Cup.
7. India (IND): Originally, the two teams from India which would have qualified for the 2021 AFC Cup would have been Mohun Bagan, the 2019–20 I-League champions (they were already assured of the title before the league was abandoned due to the COVID-19 pandemic in India) qualified as India 2 (group stage), and ATK, the 2020 Indian Super League playoffs winners qualified as India 3 (qualifying playoffs). However, KGSPL, the owners of ATK, ceased their football team and bought majority stakes in Mohun Bagan FC (India) Private Limited and rebranded Mohun Bagan football team as ATK Mohun Bagan FC from the 2020–21 Indian Super League season which qualified as India 2. The All India Football Federation decided that Bengaluru, the 2019–20 Indian Super League regular season third place (since ATK were also regular season runners-up), would qualify for the 2021 AFC Cup playoffs as India 3.
8. Jordan (JOR): Due to the COVID-19 pandemic in Jordan, the 2020 Jordan FA Cup was cancelled and not organized by the Jordan Football Association. The teams from Jordan playing in the 2021 AFC Cup were determined only by the results of the 2020 Jordanian Pro League. Al-Jazeera and Al-Ramtha, the 2020 Jordanian Pro League runners-up and third place, were not granted an AFC Cup license. As a result, Al-Salt and Al-Faisaly, the second and third best teams granted an AFC Cup license (2020 Jordanian Pro League fourth place and fifth place), qualified for the 2021 AFC Cup.
9. Lebanon (LBN): Due to the COVID-19 pandemic in Lebanon, the 2019–20 Lebanese Premier League and the 2019–20 Lebanese FA Cup were cancelled and declared null and void by the Lebanese Football Association (the competitions were previously suspended due to domestic issues including protests and financial problems). The teams from Lebanon playing in the 2021 AFC Cup were determined by the results of the previous domestic season (2018–19 Lebanese Premier League and 2018–19 Lebanese FA Cup).
10. Malaysia (MAS): Due to the COVID-19 pandemic in Malaysia, the 2020 Malaysia FA Cup was cancelled and declared null and void by the Football Association of Malaysia. The 2020 Malaysia Cup winners would originally qualify for the 2021 AFC Cup, but it was also cancelled and declared null and void. The teams from Malaysia playing in the 2021 AFC Cup were determined only by the results of the 2020 Malaysia Super League.
11. Maldives (MDV): Due to the COVID-19 pandemic in the Maldives, the 2020 Maldives FA Cup was cancelled and declared null and void by the Football Association of Maldives. The teams from the Maldives playing in the 2021 AFC Cup were determined only by the results of the 2019–20 Dhivehi Premier League.
12. Myanmar (MYA): Due to the COVID-19 pandemic in Myanmar, the 2020 General Aung San Shield was cancelled and declared null and void by the Myanmar Football Federation. The teams from Myanmar playing in the 2021 AFC Cup were determined only by the results of the 2020 Myanmar National League.
13. Nepal (NEP): Machhindra, the 2019–20 Martyr's Memorial A-Division League champions, were not granted an AFC Cup license. As a result, Nepal Army Club, the best team granted an AFC Cup license (2019–20 Martyr's Memorial A-Division League runners-up), qualified for the 2021 AFC Cup.
14. Oman (OMA): Dhofar, the 2019–20 Sultan Qaboos Cup winners, were not granted an AFC Cup license. As a result, Al-Nasr, the second best team granted an AFC Cup license (2019–20 Oman Professional League fifth place), qualified for the 2021 AFC Cup.
15. Philippines (PHI): Due to the COVID-19 pandemic in the Philippines, the 2020 Copa Paulino Alcantara was cancelled and not organized by the Philippine Football Federation. The teams from the Philippines playing in the 2021 AFC Cup were determined only by the results of the 2020 Philippines Football League. Azkals Development Team, the 2020 Philippines Football League third place, are a team under the control of the Philippine Football Federation and thus ineligible to represent the Philippines in AFC club competitions. Therefore, there was no standby team from the Philippines as there were only six teams in the league and only teams in the top half were eligible.
16. Palestine (PLE): Due to the COVID-19 pandemic in the State of Palestine, the 2019–20 Palestine Cup was cancelled and declared null and void by the Palestinian Football Association. The teams from Palestine playing in the 2021 AFC Cup were determined only by the results of the 2019–20 West Bank Premier League.
17. Singapore (SIN): Due to the COVID-19 pandemic in Singapore, the 2020 Singapore Cup was cancelled and not organized by the Football Association of Singapore. The teams from Singapore playing in the 2021 AFC Cup were determined only by the results of the 2020 Singapore Premier League. Albirex Niigata (S), the 2020 Singapore Premier League champions, were a team from Japan and thus ineligible to represent Singapore in AFC club competitions. As a result, Geylang International, the Singapore Premier League fourth place, qualified for the AFC Cup.
18. South Asia Zone (SAZ): On 30 April 2021, the AFC decided that Abahani Limited Dhaka were considered to have withdrawn from the preliminary stage after the draw, due to challenges in meeting the extended deadline to host their preliminary round 2 match and also considering the lockdown and travel restrictions due to the COVID-19 pandemic in Bangladesh.
19. Sri Lanka (SRI): Due to the COVID-19 pandemic in Sri Lanka, the 2019–20 Sri Lanka Champions League was cancelled and not organized by the Football Federation of Sri Lanka. The 2019–20 Sri Lanka FA Cup winners would qualify for the 2021 AFC Cup.
20. Turkmenistan (TKM): Altyn Asyr, the 2020 Ýokary Liga champions and 2020 Turkmenistan Cup winners, and Ahal, the 2020 Ýokary Liga runners-up, were not granted an AFC Champions League license, but were granted an AFC Cup license. As a result, they qualified for the 2021 AFC Cup.
21. Timor-Leste (TLS): Due to the COVID-19 pandemic in East Timor, the 2020 LFA Primeira was cancelled and not organized by the East Timor Football Federation. The 2020 Copa FFTL winners would qualify for the 2021 AFC Cup.
22. Uzbekistan (UZB): Nasaf, the 2020 Uzbekistan Super League runners-up, were not granted an AFC Champions League license. As a result, AGMK, the second best team granted an AFC Champions League license (2020 Uzbekistan Super League third place), qualified for the 2021 AFC Champions League, and would have played in the AFC Cup had they failed to advance to the AFC Champions League group stage. Since AGMK advanced from the AFC Champions League qualifying play-offs to the group stage, Nasaf, which were granted an AFC Cup license and were the standby team from Uzbekistan, replaced AGMK in the AFC Cup group stage.
23. West Asia Zone (WAZ): On 23 April 2021, the AFC announced that the two teams from Oman, Al-Seeb and Al-Nasr, withdrew from the group stage after the draw, after the suspension of all international and domestic sporting activities due to the COVID-19 pandemic in Oman. As a result, the AFC decided to cancel the play-off round match between Markaz Shabab Al-Am'ari and Al-Kuwait, and promote both teams to the group stage.
Location of teams of the 2021 AFC Cup.
Brown: Group A; Red: Group B; Orange: Group C; Yellow: Group D; Pink: Group E;
Green: Group F; Blue: Group G; Cyan: Group H; Turquoise: Group I; Purple: Group J;
(H) Group stage hosts
Qualifying play-offs
~~Withdrawn teams~~

== Schedule ==
The schedule of the competition is as follows.

On 11 November 2020, the AFC approved a new calendar for the competition due to the COVID-19 pandemic, where the group stage is played as centralized single round-robin tournament, and the preliminary round, play-off round, and ASEAN Zonal semi-finals and final are played as a single match. On 25 January 2021, the AFC published the schedule of the competition. On 1 March 2021, the AFC announced the hosts for the group stage, except for Group G whose hosts will be decided at a later date. On 27 March 2021, the AFC announced that the West Asia Zone group matches were rescheduled from 23 to 29 May to 21–27 May. On 26 April 2021, the AFC announced that the ASEAN Zone group matches were rescheduled from 22 to 28 June to 29 June – 6 July. On 3 May 2021, the AFC announced that the East Asia Zone group matches were rescheduled from 14 to 20 May to 23–29 June. On 9 May 2021, the AFC announced that the South Asia Zone group matches which were originally scheduled between 14 and 20 May would be postponed indefinitely. On 27 May 2021, the AFC announced that the ASEAN Zone group matches which were originally scheduled between 29 June – 6 July would be postponed indefinitely. On 7 July 2021, AFC decided to cancel the matches in ASEAN Zone.

Notes:

- W: West Asia Zone
- S: South Asia Zone
- C: Central Asia Zone
- A: ASEAN Zone
- E: East Asia Zone

Stage	Round	Draw date	Match date
Preliminary stage	Preliminary round 1	No draw	7 April 2021 (S)
Preliminary stage	Preliminary round 2	No draw	14 April 2021 (S)
Play-off stage	Play-off round	No draw	15 August 2021 (S)
Group stage	Matchday 1	27 January 2021	14 May 2021 (C), 21 May 2021 (W), 23 June 2021 (E), 18 August 2021 (S)
Group stage	Matchday 2	27 January 2021	17 May 2021 (C), 24 May 2021 (W), 26 June 2021 (E) 21 August 2021 (S)
Group stage	Matchday 3	27 January 2021	20 May 2021 (C), 27 May 2021 (W), 29 June 2021 (E) 24 August 2021 (S)
Knockout stage	Zonal semi-finals	27 January 2021	20–21 September 2021 (W)
Knockout stage	Zonal finals	4 August 2021	25 August 2021 (C), 20 October 2021 (W)
Knockout stage	Inter-zone play-off semi-finals	4 August 2021	21–22 September 2021
Knockout stage	Inter-zone play-off final	4 August 2021	20 October 2021
Knockout stage	Final	4 August 2021	5 November 2021 at Al Muharraq Stadium, Arad

The original schedule of the competition, as planned before the pandemic, was as follows.

Original schedule for 2021 AFC Cup
Stage	Round	Draw date	First leg	Second leg
Preliminary stage	Preliminary round	No draw	5–6 January 2021 (W, A); 26–27 January 2021 (S, C, E)	12–13 January 2021 (W, A); 2–3 February 2021 (S, C, E)
Play-off stage	Play-off round	No draw	19–20 January 2021 (W, A); 9–10 February 2021 (S, C, E)	26–27 January 2021 (W, A); 16–17 February 2021 (S, C, E)
Group stage	Matchday 1	TBD	15–17 February 2021 (W, A), 2–3 March 2021 (S, C, E)	
Group stage	Matchday 2	TBD	1–3 March 2021 (W, A), 16–17 March 2021 (S, C, E)	
Group stage	Matchday 3	TBD	15–17 March 2021 (W, A), 6–7 April 2021 (S, C, E)	
Group stage	Matchday 4	TBD	5–7 April 2021 (W, A), 13–14 April 2021 (S, C, E)	
Group stage	Matchday 5	TBD	12–14 April 2021 (W, A), 18–19 May 2021 (S, C, E)	
Group stage	Matchday 6	TBD	26–28 April 2021 (W, A), 25–26 May 2021 (S, C, E)	
Knockout stage	Zonal semi-finals	TBD	17–19 May 2021 (W, A)	24–26 May 2021 (W, A)
Knockout stage	Zonal finals	TBD	3–4 August 2021 (C^{*}, S^{*}, E^{*}, A); 28 September 2021 (W)	10–11 August 2021 (C^{*}, S^{*}, E^{*}, A); 19 October 2021 (W)
Knockout stage	Inter-zone play-off semi-finals	TBD	24–25 August 2021	14–15 September 2021
Knockout stage	Inter-zone play-off final	TBD	29 September 2021	20 October 2021
Knockout stage	Final	TBD	6 November 2021	

== Qualifying play-offs ==
In the qualifying play-offs, each tie was played as a single match. Extra time and penalty shoot-out were used to decide the winner if necessary. The bracket of the qualifying play-offs for each zone was determined based on each team's association ranking, with the team from the higher-ranked association hosting the match. The one winner of preliminary round 2 (from ASEAN Zone) and one winner of the play-off round (from South Zone) advanced to the group stage to join the 35 direct entrants.

=== Preliminary round 1 ===
South Asia Zone
Team 1	Score	Team 2
Nepal Army Club	5–1	Sri Lanka Police
Eagles (Maldives)	2–0	(Bhutan) Thimphu City

=== Preliminary round 2 ===
South Asia Zone
Team 1	Score	Team 2
Bengaluru (India)	5–0	Nepal Army Club
Abahani Limited Dhaka (Bangladesh)	Cancelled (Note: On 30 April 2021, the AFC decided that Abahani Limited Dhaka were considered to have withdrawn from the preliminary stage after the draw, due to challenges in meeting the extended deadline to host their preliminary round 2 match and also considering the lockdown and travel restrictions due to the COVID-19 pandemic in Bangladesh.)	(Maldives) Eagles

ASEAN Zone
Team 1	Score	Team 2
Chanthabouly (Laos)	Cancelled (Note: On 30 April 2021, the AFC announced that the two teams from Myanmar, Shan United and Hanthawady United, withdrew from the group stage and play-off stage respectively after the draw, due to the state of emergency caused by the 2021 Myanmar coup d'état. As a result, the AFC decided to cancel the two play-off round matches, and promote Persipura Jayapura and the two preliminary stage winners to the group stage. However, after Kaya–Iloilo secured their qualification for the AFC Champions League group stage and taking into consideration the absence of a standby club from Philippines, on 6 July 2021, the AFC decided to cancel the preliminary stage match between Visakha and Lanelok United and promoted them to Group I. Later, on 7 July 2021, the AFC decided to cancel all matches of the ASEAN Zone, including the preliminary stage match.)	(Brunei) Kasuka
Visakha (Cambodia)	Cancelled	(Timor-Leste) Lalenok United

=== Play-off round ===
West Asia Zone
Team 1	Score	Team 2
Markaz Shabab Al-Am'ari (Palestine)	Cancelled (Note: On 23 April 2021, the AFC announced that the two teams from Oman, Al-Seeb and Al-Nasr, withdrew from the group stage after the draw, after the suspension of all international and domestic sporting activities due to the COVID-19 pandemic in Oman. As a result, the AFC decided to cancel the play-off round match between Markaz Shabab Al-Am'ari and Al-Kuwait, and promote both teams to the group stage.)	Al-Kuwait

South Asia Zone
Team 1	Score	Team 2
Bengaluru (India)	1–0	(Maldives) Eagles

ASEAN Zone
Team 1	Score	Team 2
Hanthawady United (Myanmar)	Cancelled	Winners of ASEAN 2.1
Persipura Jayapura (Indonesia)	Cancelled	Winners of ASEAN 2.2

== Group stage ==
The draw for the group stage was held on 27 January 2021, 14:30 MYT (UTC+8), at the AFC House in Kuala Lumpur, Malaysia. The 38 teams were drawn into nine groups of four and one group of three (in the Central Asia Zone): three groups each in the West Asia Zone (Groups A–C) and the ASEAN Zone (Groups G–I), two groups in the Central Asia Zone (Groups E–F), and one group each in the South Asia Zone (Group D) and the East Asia Zone (Group J). For each zone, teams were seeded into four pots and drawn into the relevant positions within each group, based on their association ranking and their seeding within their association, in consideration of technical balance between groups. Teams from the same association in zones with more than one group (West Asia Zone, Central Asia Zone, and ASEAN Zone) could not be drawn into the same group. In the group stage, each group was played on a single round-robin basis in centralised venues. The following teams advanced to the knockout stage:

- The winners of each group and the best runners-up in the West Asia Zone and the ASEAN Zone advanced to the Zonal semi-finals.
- The winners of each group in the Central Asia Zone advanced to the Zonal finals.
- The winners of each group in the South Asia Zone and the East Asia Zone advanced to the Inter-zone play-off semi-finals.

Tiebreakers

The teams were ranked according to points (3 points for a win, 1 point for a draw, 0 points for a loss). If tied on points, tiebreakers were applied in the following order (Regulations Article 8.3):

1. Points in head-to-head matches among tied teams;
2. Goal difference in head-to-head matches among tied teams;
3. Goals scored in head-to-head matches among tied teams;
4. ~~Away goals scored in head-to-head matches among tied teams~~; (not applicable since the matches were played in a centralised venue)
5. If more than two teams are tied, and after applying all head-to-head criteria above, a subset of teams are still tied, all head-to-head criteria above are reapplied exclusively to this subset of teams;
6. Goal difference in all group matches;
7. Goals scored in all group matches;
8. Penalty shoot-out if only two teams playing each other in the last round of the group are tied;
9. Disciplinary points (yellow card = 1 point, red card as a result of two yellow cards = 3 points, direct red card = 3 points, yellow card followed by direct red card = 4 points);
10. Association ranking;
11. Drawing of lots.

=== Group A ===
Pos	Team	Pld	W	D	L	GF	GA	GD	Pts	Qualification	AHE	WAH	HID
1	(Lebanon) Al-Ahed	2	1	1	0	2	1	+1	4	Zonal semi-finals	—	—	2–1
2	(Syria) Al-Wahda	2	0	2	0	1	1	0	2		0–0	—	—
3	(Bahrain) Al-Hidd (H)	2	0	1	1	2	3	−1	1		—	1–1	—

Source: AFC
(H) Hosts

=== Group B ===
Pos	Team	Pld	W	D	L	GF	GA	GD	Pts	Qualification	MUH	SAL	ANS	MBA
1	(Bahrain) Al-Muharraq	3	2	0	1	6	4	+2	6 (Note: Head-to-head points: Al-Muharraq 3, Al-Salt 0.)	Zonal semi-finals	—	—	—	2–3
2	(Jordan) Al-Salt (H)	3	2	0	1	7	2	+5	6	Zonal semi-finals	0–1	—	—	5–0
3	(Lebanon) Al-Ansar	3	1	0	2	4	5	−1	3 (Note: Head-to-head points: Al-Ansar 3, Markaz Balata 0.)		1–3	1–2	—	—
4	(Palestine) Markaz Balata	3	1	0	2	3	9	−6	3		—	—	0–2	—

Source: AFC
(H) Hosts

=== Group C ===
Pos	Team	Pld	W	D	L	GF	GA	GD	Pts	Qualification	KSC	FAI	TIS	MSA
1	Al-Kuwait	3	2	1	0	8	4	+4	7	Zonal semi-finals	—	—	—	4–1
2	(Jordan) Al-Faisaly (H)	3	2	0	1	3	1	+2	6		0–1	—	1–0	—
3	(Syria) Tishreen	3	1	1	1	8	5	+3	4		3–3	—	—	5–1
4	(Palestine) Markaz Shabab Al-Am'ari	3	0	0	3	2	11	−9	0		—	0–2	—	—

Source: AFC
(H) Hosts

=== Group D ===
Pos	Team	Pld	W	D	L	GF	GA	GD	Pts	Qualification	MBSG	BSK	BFC	MAZ
1	(India) ATK Mohun Bagan	3	2	1	0	6	2	+4	7	Inter-zone play-off semi-finals	—	1–1	2–0	—
2	(Bangladesh) Bashundhara Kings	3	1	2	0	3	1	+2	5		—	—	—	2–0
3	(India) Bengaluru	3	1	1	1	6	4	+2	4		—	0−0	—	—
4	(Maldives) Maziya (H)	3	0	0	3	3	11	−8	0		1–3	—	2–6	—

Source: AFC
(H) Hosts

=== Group E ===
Pos	Team	Pld	W	D	L	GF	GA	GD	Pts	Qualification	AHA	DOR	RAV
1	(Turkmenistan) Ahal	2	2	0	0	5	1	+4	6	Zonal finals	—	—	3–1
2	(Kyrgyzstan) Dordoi (H)	2	1	0	1	3	2	+1	3		0–2	—	—
3	(Tajikistan) Ravshan Kulob	2	0	0	2	1	6	−5	0		—	0–3	—

Source: AFC
(H) Hosts

=== Group F ===
Pos	Team	Pld	W	D	L	GF	GA	GD	Pts	Qualification	NAS	ALT	KHU	ALA
1	(Uzbekistan) Nasaf	3	3	0	0	9	0	+9	9	Zonal finals	—	2–0	—	4–0
2	(Turkmenistan) Altyn Asyr	3	1	1	1	7	8	−1	4		—	—	2–2	—
3	(Tajikistan) Khujand (H)	3	1	1	1	4	5	−1	4		0–3	—	—	2–0
4	(Kyrgyzstan) Alay	3	0	0	3	4	11	−7	0		—	4–5	—	—

Source: AFC
(H) Hosts

=== Group G (cancelled) ===
Pos	Team	Pld	W	D	L	GF	GA	GD	Pts	HAN	BAL	BOE	G4
1	(Vietnam) Hanoi	0	0	0	0	0	0	0	0	—	Cancelled	—	Cancelled
2	(Indonesia) Bali United	0	0	0	0	0	0	0	0	—	—	Cancelled	—
3	(Cambodia) Boeung Ket	0	0	0	0	0	0	0	0	Cancelled	—	—	Cancelled
4	Winners of ASEAN 2.1	0	0	0	0	0	0	0	0	—	Cancelled	—	—

Source: AFC

=== Group H (cancelled) ===
Pos	Team	Pld	W	D	L	GF	GA	GD	Pts	KED	LIO	SGN	PPR
1	(Malaysia) Kedah Darul Aman	0	0	0	0	0	0	0	0	—	Cancelled	—	Cancelled
2	(Singapore) Lion City Sailors	0	0	0	0	0	0	0	0	—	—	Cancelled	—
3	(Vietnam) Saigon	0	0	0	0	0	0	0	0	Cancelled	—	—	Cancelled
4	(Indonesia) Persipura Jayapura	0	0	0	0	0	0	0	0	—	Cancelled	—	—

Source: AFC

=== Group I (cancelled) ===
Pos	Team	Pld	W	D	L	GF	GA	GD	Pts	VIS	LAL	TER	GEY
1	(Cambodia) Visakha	0	0	0	0	0	0	0	0	—	Cancelled	—	Cancelled
2	(Timor-Leste) Lalenok United	0	0	0	0	0	0	0	0	—	—	Cancelled	—
3	(Malaysia) Terengganu	0	0	0	0	0	0	0	0	Cancelled	—	—	Cancelled
4	(Singapore) Geylang International	0	0	0	0	0	0	0	0	—	Cancelled	—	—

Source: AFC

=== Group J ===
Pos	Team	Pld	W	D	L	GF	GA	GD	Pts	Qualification	LEE	EAS	TNC	ATH
1	(Hong Kong) Lee Man (H)	3	3	0	0	10	2	+8	9	Inter-zone play-off finals (Note: After matches in ASEAN Zone was cancelled, there are only three teams which qualified to the Inter-zone play-off semi-finals, i.e., the winners of the South Asia Zone (Group D), the winners of the East Asia Zone (Group J), and the winners of the Central Zonal final. The three Zonal champions will be drawn into two pairings where one club will get a bye to the Inter-zone play-off final, which happened for Lee Man.)	—	—	4–1	—
2	(Hong Kong) Eastern (H)	3	2	0	1	2	1	+1	6		0–1	—	1–0	—
3	(Chinese Taipei) Tainan City	3	1	0	2	4	5	−1	3		—	—	—	3–0
4	(Mongolia) Athletic 220	3	0	0	3	1	9	−8	0		1–5	0–1	—	—

Source: AFC
(H) Hosts

=== Ranking of runner-up teams ===
==== West Asia Zone ====
As Group A only had three teams, the results against fourth-placed teams in Groups B and C were not considered in this ranking.

Pos	Grp	Team	Pld	W	D	L	GF	GA	GD	Pts	Qualification
1	B	(Jordan) Al-Salt	2	1	0	1	2	2	0	3	Zonal semi-finals
2	C	(Jordan) Al-Faisaly	2	1	0	1	1	1	0	3	
3	A	(Syria) Al-Wahda	2	0	2	0	1	1	0	2	

Source: AFC
Rules for classification: 1) Points; 2) Goal difference; 3) Goals scored; 4) Disciplinary points; 5) Drawing of lots.

==== ASEAN Zone (cancelled) ====
Pos	Grp	Team	Pld	W	D	L	GF	GA	GD	Pts
1	G	G2	0	0	0	0	0	0	0	0
2	H	H2	0	0	0	0	0	0	0	0
3	I	I2	0	0	0	0	0	0	0	0

Source: AFC
Rules for classification: 1) Points; 2) Goal difference; 3) Goals scored; 4) Disciplinary points; 5) Drawing of lots.

== Knockout stage ==
In the knockout stage, the eight teams played a single-elimination tournament. Each tie was played as a single match. Extra time and penalty shoot-out were used to decide the winners if necessary (Regulations Article 9.3 and 10.1).

=== Bracket ===
Zonal semi-finals
(Bahrain) Al-Muharraq	3
(Lebanon) Al-Ahed	0
Al-Kuwait	2
(Jordan) Al-Salt	0

Zonal finals
(Bahrain) Al-Muharraq	2
Al-Kuwait	0
(Uzbekistan) Nasaf	3
(Turkmenistan) Ahal	2

Inter-zone play-off semi-finals
(Uzbekistan) Nasaf	6
(India) ATK Mohun Bagan	0

Inter-zone play-off final
(Uzbekistan) Nasaf (a.e.t.)	3
(Hong Kong) Lee Man	2

Final
(Bahrain) Al-Muharraq	3
(Uzbekistan) Nasaf	0

=== Zonal semi-finals ===
The West Asia Zonal semi-finals were played over one leg, with the home team determined by the draw mechanism based on which group runners-up qualify. A group winner hosted the match against a group runner-up. If two group winners played each other, one of the group winner (whose group runner-up qualify) hosted the match.

West Asia Zone
Team 1	Score	Team 2
Al-Muharraq (Bahrain)	3–0	(Lebanon) Al-Ahed
Al-Kuwait	2–0	(Jordan) Al-Salt

ASEAN Zone
Team 1	Score	Team 2
	~~10–11 Aug~~	
	~~10–11 Aug~~	

=== Zonal finals ===
The West Asia and Central Asia Zonal final were played over one leg, with the home team decided by draw. The winners of the West Asia Zonal final advanced to the final, while the winners of the Central Asia Zonal final advanced to the Inter-zone play-off semi-finals.

West Asia Zone
Team 1	Score	Team 2
Al-Muharraq (Bahrain)	2–0	Al-Kuwait

Central Asia Zone
Team 1	Score	Team 2
Nasaf (Uzbekistan)	3–2	(Turkmenistan) Ahal

ASEAN Zone
Team 1	Score	Team 2
	~~25 Aug~~	

=== Inter-zone play-off semi-finals ===
After matches in ASEAN Zone was cancelled, there were only three teams which qualified to the Inter-zone play-off semi-finals, i.e., the winners of the South Asia Zone (Group D), the winners of the East Asia Zone (Group J), and the winners of the Central Zonal final. The three Zonal champions were drawn into two pairings where one club got a bye to the Inter-zone play-off final, which happened for Lee Man. The matchups and order of legs decided by draw, without any seeding with the winner of Central Zonal Final hosting the match and the winner of South Asia Zone being the away team.

Team 1	Score	Team 2
Nasaf (Uzbekistan)	6–0	(India) ATK Mohun Bagan

=== Inter-zone play-off final ===
In the Inter-zone play-off final, the two teams which advanced from the Inter-zone play-off semi-finals played each other, with the order of legs determined by the Inter-zone play-off semi-final draw. The winners of the Inter-zone play-off final advanced to the final.

Team 1	Score	Team 2
Nasaf (Uzbekistan)	3–2 (a.e.t.)	(Hong Kong) Lee Man

=== Final ===
The final was played over one leg, between the winners of the West Asia Zonal final and the winners of the Inter-zone play-off final. The home team was determined on a rotation basis, with the match hosted by the winners of the West Asia Zonal final, as in the case of odd-numbered years (Regulations 9.1.2).

5 November 2021
19:00 UTC+3

Al-Muharraq (Bahrain)	3–0	(Uzbekistan) Nasaf
Al-Mardi 2'; Jameel 74'; Carioca 80'	Live Report; Stats Report

Al Muharraq Stadium, Arad
Attendance: 9,060
Referee: Ko Hyung-jin (South Korea)

== Top scorers ==
Team eliminated / inactive for this round.
Player is not in the team but team still active for this round.

Rank	Player	Team	MD1	MD2	MD3	ZSF	ZF	ISF	IF	F	Total
1	(Uzbekistan) Khusayin Norchaev	(Uzbekistan) Nasaf	1		1		1	3	1		7
2	(Turkmenistan) Elman Tagaýew	(Turkmenistan) Ahal	2	1			2				5
3	(Tunisia) Ahmed Akaïchi	Al-Kuwait	1	2	1						4
3	(Turkmenistan) Altymyrat Annadurdyýew	(Turkmenistan) Altyn Asyr	2	2							4
3	(Brazil) Gil	(Hong Kong) Lee Man	1		2				1		4
3	(Cameroon) Ronald Ngah	(Jordan) Al-Salt		1	3						4
7	(Kuwait) Faisal Al-Harbi	Al-Kuwait	2			1					3
7	(Lebanon) Hassan Maatouk	(Lebanon) Al-Ansar	1	1	1						3
7	(Palestine) Khaled Salem	(Palestine) Markaz Balata		3							3
10	(Bahrain) Ismail Abdullatif	(Bahrain) Al-Muharraq	1		1						2
10	(Uzbekistan) Husniddin Aliqulov	(Uzbekistan) Nasaf	1	1							2
10	(Jordan) Mahmoud Al-Mardi	(Bahrain) Al-Muharraq					1			1	2
10	(Serbia) Andrija Kaluđerović	(Uzbekistan) Nasaf					1		1		2
10	(Spain) José Ángel	(Hong Kong) Lee Man		1					1		2
10	(Kyrgyzstan) Abay Bokoleev	(Kyrgyzstan) Dordoi			2						2
10	(Tajikistan) Dilshod Bozorov	(Tajikistan) Khujand	1		1						2
10	(Brazil) Flávio Carioca	(Bahrain) Al-Muharraq					1			1	2
10	(Chinese Taipei) Chen Jui-chieh	(Chinese Taipei) Tainan City	2								2
10	(Fiji) Roy Krishna	(India) ATK Mohun Bagan	1	1							2
10	(Uzbekistan) Shokhmalik Komilov	(Uzbekistan) Nasaf	1		1						2
10	(Syria) Thaer Krouma	(Syria) Tishreen			2						2
10	(Hong Kong) Lee Hong Lim	(Hong Kong) Lee Man			2						2
10	(Syria) Mohammad Marmour	(Syria) Tishreen	1		1						2
10	(India) Bidyashagar Singh	(India) Bengaluru			2						2

Note: Goals scored in the qualifying play-offs are not counted when determining top scorer (Regulations Article 57.4).

== See also ==
- 2021 AFC Champions League
- 2021 AFC Women's Club Championship
