= 2021 AFC Cup qualifying play-offs =

Football tournament qualification stage

The 2021 AFC Cup qualifying play-offs were played from 7 April to 15 August 2021. A total of seven teams competed in the qualifying play-offs to decide three of the 38 places in the group stage of the 2021 AFC Cup.

== Teams ==
The following 7 teams, split into five zones (West Asia Zone, Central Asia Zone, South Asia Zone, ASEAN Zone, East Asia Zone), entered the qualifying play-offs, consisting of three rounds:

- 4 teams entered in the preliminary round 1.
- 3 teams entered in the preliminary round 2.

Zone	Teams entering in play-off round	Teams entering in preliminary round 2	Teams entering in preliminary round 1
West Asia Zone	(Palestine) ~~Markaz Shabab Al-Am'ari~~ (Note: On 23 April 2021, the AFC announced that the two teams from Oman, Al-Seeb and Al-Nasr, withdrew from the group stage after the draw, after the suspension of all international and domestic sporting activities due to the COVID-19 pandemic in Oman. As a result, the AFC decided to cancel the play-off round match between Markaz Shabab Al-Am'ari and Al-Kuwait, and promote both teams to the group stage.); ~~Al-Kuwait~~		
South Asia Zone		(India) Bengaluru; (Bangladesh) ~~Abahani Limited Dhaka~~ (Note: On 30 April 2021, the AFC decided that Abahani Limited Dhaka were considered to have withdrawn from the preliminary stage after the draw, due to challenges in meeting the extended deadline to host their preliminary round 2 match and also considering the lockdown and travel restrictions due to the COVID-19 pandemic in Bangladesh.)	(Maldives) Eagles; Nepal Army Club; Sri Lanka Police; (Bhutan) Thimphu City
Central Asia Zone	None		
ASEAN Zone	(Myanmar) ~~Hanthawady United~~ (Note: On 30 April 2021, the AFC announced that the two teams from Myanmar, Shan United and Hanthawady United, withdrew from the group stage and play-off stage respectively after the draw, due to the state of emergency caused by the 2021 Myanmar coup d'état. As a result, the AFC decided to cancel the two play-off round matches, and promote Persipura Jayapura and the two preliminary stage winners to the group stage. However, after Kaya–Iloilo secured their qualification for the AFC Champions League group stage and taking into consideration the absence of a standby club from Philippines, on 6 July 2021, the AFC decided to cancel the preliminary stage match between Visakha and Lanelok United and promoted them to Group I. Later, on 7 July 2021, the AFC decided to cancel all matches of the ASEAN Zone, including the preliminary stage match.); (Indonesia) ~~Persipura Jayapura~~	(Cambodia) ~~Visakha~~; (Laos) Chanthabouly; (Brunei) Kasuka; (Timor-Leste) ~~Lalenok United~~	
East Asia Zone	None		

== Format ==
In the qualifying play-offs, each tie was played as a single match. Extra time and penalty shoot-out were used to decide the winner if necessary.

== Schedule ==
The schedule of each round was as follows.

Round	West Asia Zone	South Asia Zone	ASEAN Zone
Preliminary round 1	Not played	7 April 2021	Not played
Preliminary round 2	Not played	14 April 2021	Cancelled
Play-off round	Cancelled	15 August 2021	Cancelled

== Bracket ==
The bracket of the qualifying play-offs for each zone was determined based on each team's association ranking, with the team from the higher-ranked association hosting the match. The one winner of preliminary round 2 (from ASEAN Zone) and one winner of the play-off round (from South Zone) advanced to the group stage to join the 35 direct entrants.

=== Play-off West Asia ===
- Both teams advanced to Group C.

Play-off round
(Palestine) Markaz Shabab Al-Am'ari	—
Al-Kuwait	—

=== Play-off South Asia ===
- Bengaluru advanced to Group D.

Preliminary round 1
7 April
Nepal Army Club	5
Sri Lanka Police	1
7 April
(Maldives) Eagles	2
(Bhutan) Thimphu City	0

Preliminary round 2
14 April
(India) Bengaluru	5
Nepal Army Club	0
(Bangladesh) Abahani Limited Dhaka	—
(Maldives) Eagles (w/o)	—

Play-off round
15 August
(India) Bengaluru	1
(Maldives) Eagles	0

=== Play-off ASEAN 1 ===
- Winners of Preliminary round 2 would have advanced to Group G.

Preliminary round 2
(Laos) Chanthabouly	—
(Brunei) Kasuka	—

Play-off round
(Myanmar) Hanthawady United	—
Winners of ASEAN 2.1 (w/o)	—

=== Play-off ASEAN 2 ===
- Persipura Jayapura advanced to Group H, while Visakha and Lalenok United advanced to Group I.

Preliminary round 2
(Cambodia) Visakha	—
(Timor-Leste) Lalenok United	—

Play-off round
(Indonesia) Persipura Jayapura	—
Winners of ASEAN 2.2	—

== Preliminary round 1 ==
=== Summary ===
A total of four teams played in the preliminary round 1.

South Asia Zone
Team 1	Score	Team 2
Nepal Army Club	5–1	Sri Lanka Police
Eagles (Maldives)	2–0	(Bhutan) Thimphu City

=== South Asia Zone ===
7 April 2021
17:30 UTC+5:45

Nepal Army Club	5–1	Sri Lanka Police
Tamang 41'; Shrestha 43', 90+3'; Basnet 50'; Rai 83'	Report	Asante 28'

Dasharath Rangasala, Kathmandu
Attendance: 2,470
Referee: Ahmad Al Ali (Kuwait)

7 April 2021
16:00 UTC+5

Eagles (Maldives)	2–0	(Bhutan) Thimphu City
Ahmed 10'; Naim 90'	Report

National Football Stadium, Malé
Attendance: 25
Referee: Nasrullo Kabirov (Tajikistan)

== Preliminary round 2 ==
=== Summary ===
A total of eight teams played in the preliminary round 2: six teams which entered in this round, and two winners of the preliminary round 1.

South Asia Zone
Team 1	Score	Team 2
Bengaluru (India)	5–0	Nepal Army Club
Abahani Limited Dhaka (Bangladesh)	Cancelled	(Maldives) Eagles

ASEAN Zone
Team 1	Score	Team 2
Chanthabouly (Laos)	Cancelled	(Brunei) Kasuka
Visakha (Cambodia)	Cancelled	(Timor-Leste) Lalenok United

=== South Asia Zone ===
14 April 2021
19:30 UTC+5:30

Bengaluru (India)	5–0	Nepal Army Club
Bheke 51', 65'; Chhetri 52'; Silva 61', 65'	Report

GMC Athletic Stadium, Bambolim
Attendance: 0
Referee: Ali Reda (Lebanon)

(Note: The preliminary round 2 match between Abahani Limited Dhaka and Eagles was originally scheduled to be played on 14 April 2021, 16:30 UTC+6, at Bangabandhu National Stadium, Dhaka, but was initially rescheduled to be played on 21 April 2021, 17:30 UTC+5:45, at Dasharath Rangasala, Kathmandu (Nepal), due to the COVID-19 pandemic in Bangladesh which caused a lockdown starting from 14 April. However, it was later further postponed, before it was eventually cancelled.)

Abahani Limited Dhaka (Bangladesh)	Cancelled	(Maldives) Eagles
	Report

=== ASEAN Zone ===
(Note: The preliminary round 2 matches in the ASEAN Zone were originally scheduled to be played on 28 April 2021, but were initially rescheduled to be played on 19 May 2021, and later on 20 June 2021. However, they were later further postponed.)
--:--

Chanthabouly (Laos)	Cancelled	(Brunei) Kasuka
	Report

Visakha (Cambodia)	Cancelled	(Timor-Leste) Lalenok United
	Report

== Play-off round ==
=== Summary ===
A total of eight teams played in the play-off round: four teams which entered in this round, and four winners of the preliminary round 2.

West Asia Zone
Team 1	Score	Team 2
Markaz Shabab Al-Am'ari (Palestine)	Cancelled	Al-Kuwait

South Asia Zone
Team 1	Score	Team 2
Bengaluru (India)	1–0	(Maldives) Eagles

ASEAN Zone
Team 1	Score	Team 2
Hanthawady United (Myanmar)	Cancelled	Winners of ASEAN 2.1
Persipura Jayapura (Indonesia)	Cancelled	Winners of ASEAN 2.2

=== West Asia Zone ===
(Note: The play-off round match between Markaz Shabab Al-Am'ari and Al-Kuwait was originally scheduled to be played on 20 April 2021, 22:00 UTC+3, at Faisal Al-Husseini International Stadium, Al-Ram, but was later rescheduled to be played on 27 April 2021 in Kuwait, due to the difficulty of Al-Kuwait to travel to the West Bank, before it was eventually cancelled.)

Markaz Shabab Al-Am'ari (Palestine)	Cancelled	Al-Kuwait
	Report

=== South Asia Zone ===
15 August 2021 (Note: The play-off round match in the South Asia Zone was originally scheduled to be played on 21 April 2021, but was initially rescheduled to be played on 28 April 2021 due to the postponement of the preliminary round 2 match between Abahani Limited Dhaka and Eagles. After the withdrawal of Abahani Limited Dhaka, the play-off round match between Bengaluru and Eagles was then scheduled to be played on 11 May 2021, 21:05 UTC+5, at National Football Stadium, Malé, prior to the start of Group D matches hosted by the centralised venue of Maldives. However, it was postponed indefinitely. The match is later rescheduled to 15 August 2021.)
20:00 UTC+5

Bengaluru (India)	1–0	(Maldives) Eagles
Rane 26'	Report

National Football Stadium, Malé
Attendance: 0
Referee: Qasim Al-Hatmi (Oman)

=== ASEAN Zone ===
(Note: The play-off round matches in the ASEAN Zone were originally scheduled to be played on 19 May 2021, before they were eventually cancelled.)

Hanthawady United (Myanmar)	Cancelled	Winners of ASEAN 2.1
	Report

Persipura Jayapura (Indonesia)	Cancelled	Winners of ASEAN 2.2
	Report
