= 2021 AFC Cup knockout stage =

Football competition in Asia

The 2021 AFC Cup knockout stage was played from 25 August to 5 November 2021. A total of 8 teams competed in the knockout stage to decide the champions of the 2021 AFC Cup. Teams from ASEAN Zone did not compete in the knockout stage, due to the cancellation of group stage matches in ASEAN Zone.

== Qualified teams ==
The following teams advanced from the group stage:

- The winners of each of the three groups and the best runners-up in the West Asia Zone (Groups A–C) advanced to the Zonal semi-finals.
- The winners of each group in the South Asia Zone (Group D), and the East Asia Zone (Group J) advanced to the Inter-zone play-off semi-finals.
- The winners of each group in the Central Asia Zone (Groups E–F) advanced to the Zonal finals.

Key to colours
Teams which enter the Inter-zone play-off finals
Teams which enter the Inter-zone play-off semi-finals
Teams which enter the Zonal finals
Teams which enter the Zonal semi-finals

Zone	Group	Winners	Best runners-up
West Asia Zone	A	(Lebanon) Al-Ahed	(Jordan) Al-Salt (Group B)
West Asia Zone	B	(Bahrain) Al-Muharraq	(Jordan) Al-Salt (Group B)
West Asia Zone	C	Al-Kuwait	(Jordan) Al-Salt (Group B)
South Asia Zone	D	(India) ATK Mohun Bagan	—
Central Asia Zone	E	(Turkmenistan) Ahal	—
Central Asia Zone	F	(Uzbekistan) Nasaf	—
East Asia Zone	J	(Hong Kong) Lee Man	—

== Format ==
In the knockout stage, the eight teams played a single-elimination tournament. Each tie was played as a single match. Extra time and penalty shoot-out were used to decide the winners if necessary (Regulations Article 9.3 and 10.1).

== Schedule ==
The schedule of each round is as follows (W: West Asia Zone; C: Central Asia Zone). Matches in the West Asia Zone will be played on Mondays and Tuesdays, while matches in the Central Zone and the Inter-zone play-offs will be played on Tuesdays and Wednesdays.

Round	Date
Zonal semi-finals	20–21 September 2021 (W)
Zonal finals	25 August 2021 (C), 20 October 2021 (W)
Inter-zone play-off semi-finals	21–22 September 2021
Inter-zone play-off final	20 October 2021
Final	5 November 2021

== Bracket ==
The bracket of the knockout stage was determined as follows:

Round	Matchups
Zonal semi-finals	(Matchups and order of legs determined by identity of best runners-up: In West Asia Zone, the first team listed host first leg, and the second team listed host second leg. In ASEAN Zone, the first team listed host the match) West Asia Zone: If best runners-up from Group A; WSF1: Group C winners vs. Group A winners; WSF2: Group A runners-up vs. Group B winners; If best runners-up from Group B; WSF1: Group A winners vs. Group B winners; WSF2: Group B runners-up vs. Group C winners; If best runners-up from Group C; WSF1: Group B winners vs. Group C winners; WSF2: Group C runners-up vs. Group A winners; ASEAN Zone: If best runners-up from Group G; ASF1: Group G winners vs. Group I winners; ASF2: Group H winners vs. Group G runners-up; If best runners-up from Group H; ASF1: Group H winners vs. Group G winners; ASF2: Group I winners vs. Group H runners-up; If best runners-up from Group I; ASF1: Group I winners vs. Group H winners; ASF2: Group G winners vs. Group I runners-up
Zonal finals	(Order of legs decided by draw) West Asia Zone: WF: Winners of WSF1 vs. Winners of WSF2; Central Asia Zone: CF: Group E winners vs. Group F winners; ASEAN Zone: AF: Winners of ASF1 vs. Winners of ASF2
Inter-zone play-off semi-finals	(Matchups and order of legs decided by draw, involving winners of Group D, Group J, CF, and AF): IZSF1; IZSF2
Inter-zone play-off finals	(Winners of IZSF1 host first leg, Winners of IZSF2 host second leg): IZF: Winners of IZSF1 vs. Winners of IZSF2
Final	(Winners of WF host the match, as alternated from previous season's final): Winners of WF vs. Winners of IZF

Zonal semi-finals
(Bahrain) Al-Muharraq	3
(Lebanon) Al-Ahed	0
Al-Kuwait	2
(Jordan) Al-Salt	0

Zonal finals
(Bahrain) Al-Muharraq	2
Al-Kuwait	0
(Uzbekistan) Nasaf	3
(Turkmenistan) Ahal	2

Inter-zone play-off semi-finals
(Uzbekistan) Nasaf	6
(India) ATK Mohun Bagan	0

Inter-zone play-off final
(Uzbekistan) Nasaf (a.e.t.)	3
(Hong Kong) Lee Man	2

Final
(Bahrain) Al-Muharraq	3
(Uzbekistan) Nasaf	0

== Zonal semi-finals ==
=== Summary ===
The West Asia Zonal semi-finals were played over one leg, with the home team determined by the draw mechanism based on which group runners-up qualify. A group winner hosted the match against a group runner-up. If two group winners played each other, one of the group winner (whose group runner-up qualify) hosted the match.

West Asia Zone
Team 1	Score	Team 2
Al-Muharraq (Bahrain)	3–0	(Lebanon) Al-Ahed
Al-Kuwait	2–0	(Jordan) Al-Salt

ASEAN Zone
Team 1	Score	Team 2
	~~10–11 Aug~~	
	~~10–11 Aug~~	

=== West Asia Zone ===
20 September 2021
18:15 UTC+3

Al-Muharraq (Bahrain)	3–0	(Lebanon) Al-Ahed
Jona 67'; Al Sherooqi 86'; Al-Hayki 90+2'	Live Report; Stats Report

Al Muharraq Stadium, Arad
Attendance: 6,500
Referee: Ilgiz Tantashev (Uzbekistan)

21 September 2021
19:30 UTC+3

Al-Kuwait	2–0	(Jordan) Al-Salt
Al-Harbi 13'; Mbokani 25'	Live Report; Stats Report

Al Kuwait Sports Club Stadium, Kuwait City
Attendance: 5,021
Referee: Omar Al-Yaqoubi (Oman)

== Zonal finals ==
=== Summary ===
The West Asia and Central Asia Zonal final were played over one leg, with the home team decided by draw. The winners of the West Asia Zonal final advanced to the final, while the winners of the Central Asia Zonal final advanced to the Inter-zone play-off semi-finals.

West Asia Zone
Team 1	Score	Team 2
Al-Muharraq (Bahrain)	2–0	Al-Kuwait

Central Asia Zone
Team 1	Score	Team 2
Nasaf (Uzbekistan)	3–2	(Turkmenistan) Ahal

ASEAN Zone
Team 1	Score	Team 2
	~~25 Aug~~	

=== West Asia Zone ===
20 October 2021
19:00 UTC+3

Al-Muharraq (Bahrain)	2–0	Al-Kuwait
Al-Mardi 19'; Carioca 45+1'	Live Report; Stats Report

Al Muharraq Stadium, Arad
Attendance: 8,250
Referee: Mohammed Al-Hoish (Saudi Arabia)

=== Central Asia Zone ===
25 August 2021
20:00 UTC+5

Nasaf (Uzbekistan)	3−2	(Turkmenistan) Ahal
Stanojević 26'; Kaluđerović 32'; Norchaev 76' (pen.)	Live Report; Stats Report	Tagaýew 60', 69' (pen.)

Nasaf Stadium, Qarshi
Attendance: 54
Referee: Mohammed Al-Hoish (Saudi Arabia)

== Inter-zone play-off semi-finals ==
=== Summary ===
After matches in ASEAN Zone was cancelled, there were only three teams which qualified to the Inter-zone play-off semi-finals, i.e., the winners of the South Asia Zone (Group D), the winners of the East Asia Zone (Group J), and the winners of the Central Zonal final. The three Zonal champions were drawn into two pairings where one club got a bye to the Inter-zone play-off final, which happened for Lee Man. The matchups and order of legs decided by draw, without any seeding with the winner of Central Zonal Final hosting the match and the winner of South Asia Zone being the away team.

Team 1	Score	Team 2
Nasaf (Uzbekistan)	6–0	(India) ATK Mohun Bagan

=== Matches ===
22 September 2021
20:00 UTC+5

Nasaf (Uzbekistan)	6–0	(India) ATK Mohun Bagan
Kotal 4' (o.g.); Norchaev 18', 21', 31'; Bozorov 45+1'; Narzullaev 71'	Live Report; Stats Report

Nasaf Stadium, Qarshi
Attendance: 5,865
Referee: Hanna Hattab (Syria)

== Inter-zone play-off final ==
=== Summary ===
In the Inter-zone play-off final, the two teams which advanced from the Inter-zone play-off semi-finals played each other, with the order of legs determined by the Inter-zone play-off semi-final draw. The winners of the Inter-zone play-off final advanced to the final.

Team 1	Score	Team 2
Nasaf (Uzbekistan)	3–2 (a.e.t.)	(Hong Kong) Lee Man

=== Matches ===
20 October 2021
18:00 UTC+5

Nasaf (Uzbekistan)	3–2 (a.e.t.)	(Hong Kong) Lee Man
Recio 4' (o.g.); Norchaev 26'; Kaluđerović 105+1'	Live Report; Stats Report	Gil 46'; Ángel 64' (pen.)

Markaziy Stadium, Qarshi
Attendance: 9,890
Referee: Mooud Bonyadifar (Iran)

== Final ==
The final was played over one leg, between the winners of the West Asia Zonal final and the winners of the Inter-zone play-off final. The home team was determined on a rotation basis, with the match hosted by the winners of the West Asia Zonal final, as in the case of odd-numbered years (Regulations 9.1.2).

5 November 2021
19:00 UTC+3

Al-Muharraq (Bahrain)	3–0	(Uzbekistan) Nasaf
Al-Mardi 2'; Jameel 74'; Carioca 80'	Live Report; Stats Report

Al Muharraq Stadium, Arad
Attendance: 9,060
Referee: Ko Hyung-jin (South Korea)
