= 2019–20 Oman Professional League =

Oman Professional League
- Season: 2019-20
- Dates: 14 September 2019 – 26 November 2020
- Champions: Al Seeb (1st title)
- Relegated: Oman, Al-Orouba, Mirbat
- Matches played: 182
- Goals scored: 489 (2.69 per match)

The 2019–20 Oman Professional League is the 44th edition of the Oman Professional League, the top football league in Oman. The season started on 14 September 2019 and was due to end in April 2020 but the season was suspended at match day 23 (out of 26) due to the COVID-19 pandemic.

== Team ==
Locations of teams in the 2019-20 Oman Professional League

== League table ==
| Pos | Team | Pld | W | D | L | GF | GA | GD | Pts | Qualification or relegation |
|---|---|---|---|---|---|---|---|---|---|---|
| 1 | Al-Seeb (C) | 26 | 16 | 9 | 1 | 38 | 13 | +25 | 57 | Qualification for AFC Cup group stage |
| 2 | Dhofar | 26 | 15 | 7 | 4 | 44 | 13 | +31 | 52 | |
| 3 | Al-Nahda | 26 | 11 | 7 | 8 | 40 | 34 | +6 | 40 | |
| 4 | Fanja | 26 | 10 | 9 | 7 | 42 | 41 | +1 | 39 | |
| 5 | Al-Nasr | 26 | 9 | 10 | 7 | 28 | 31 | −3 | 37 | |
| 6 | Bahla | 26 | 8 | 11 | 7 | 33 | 25 | +8 | 35 | |
| 7 | Muscat | 26 | 9 | 8 | 9 | 35 | 35 | 0 | 35 | |
| 8 | Al-Suwaiq | 26 | 10 | 5 | 11 | 30 | 30 | 0 | 35 | |
| 9 | Al-Rustaq | 26 | 8 | 9 | 9 | 33 | 30 | +3 | 33 | |
| 10 | Saham | 26 | 8 | 9 | 9 | 32 | 36 | −4 | 33 | |
| 11 | Sohar | 26 | 9 | 5 | 12 | 28 | 30 | −2 | 32 | |
| 12 | Oman (R) | 26 | 7 | 6 | 13 | 21 | 38 | −17 | 27 | Relegation to Oman First Division League |
| 13 | Al-Orouba (R) | 26 | 7 | 5 | 14 | 21 | 33 | −12 | 26 | Relegation to Oman First Division League |
| 14 | Mirbat (R) | 26 | 2 | 6 | 18 | 20 | 56 | −36 | 12 | Relegation to Oman First Division League |

Source: Goalzz
Rules for classification: 1) Points; 2) Goal difference; 3) Goals scored.
(C) Champions; (R) Relegated
