= Ahli Qalqilyah =

- Full name: Ahli Qalqilyah
- Ground: Qalqilyah, West Bank
- League: West Bank Premier League
Home colours

Ahli Qalqilyah is a Palestinian football team from the city of Qalqilyah that plays in the West Bank Premier League.
