= 2019–20 Sri Lanka FA Cup =

Tournament details
- Country: Sri Lanka
- Dates: 30 March 2019 – 7 February 2020
- Teams: 827

Final positions
- Champions: Police SC (4th title)
- Runners-up: Saunders SC

The 2019–20 Sri Lanka FA Cup (or Vantage FA Cup for sponsorship reasons) is the 57th season of Sri Lanka FA Cup, the top-tier knockout football tournament in Sri Lanka. A total of 827 teams will participate.

The tournament kicked off on 30 March 2019. It was put on hold following the Easter bombings, and resumed in May.

There are three stages: Preliminary Stage, District Stage, and National Stage. The Preliminary Stage was organized at league level on a knockout basis. The 64 winners from the Preliminary Stage will play in the District Stage. The 32 winners from the District Stage will join the 32 teams which play in the round of 32 last season.

== Round of 64 ==
The draw for the round of 64 was held on 1 October 2019. Matches were played in November and December 2019.

Results on 23 November 2019:

Results on 24 November 2019:

== Round of 32 ==
The draw for the round of 32 was held on 28 November 2019. Matches were played in December 2019.

Draw and results:

Golden Rise SC	0−8	Defenders FC

Up Country Lions SC	2−0	Great Star SC

Civil Security SC	3−3 (a.e.t.) (5−4 p)	Jamaliya

Saunders SC	4−1	United SC

Blue Star SC	0−0 (a.e.t.) (4−3 p)	Red Star SC

Super Beach SC	1−4	Red Rose

STLB SC	1−2	Police SC

Serendib SC	2−2 (a.e.t.) (0−3 p)	Prison SC

New Star SC	1−2	Young Star SC

Renown SC	4−0	Colombo FC

Sarikamula	0−2	Blue Eagles SC

Solid SC	0−2	Java Lane SC

Red Robbins SC	2−2 (a.e.t.) (3−4 p)	New Young's SC

Liverpool SC	1−1 (a.e.t.) (3−4 p)	Singing Fish SC

Navy Sea Hawks FC	3−0	Imayan Central SC

Red Sun SC	1−1 (a.e.t.) (4−2 p)	St Nicholas SC

== Round of 16 ==
The draw for the round of 16 was held on 17 December 2019. Matches were played in January 2020.

Results:

Defenders	1−1 (a.e.t.) (4−5 p)	Police SC

New Young's SC	1−1 (a.e.t.) (4−5 p)	Prison SC

Saunders SC	1−1 (a.e.t.) (3−0 p)	Java Lane SC

Young Star SC	0−2	Renown SC

Blue Star SC	6−2	Up Country Lions SC

Singing Fish SC	0−1	Navy Sea Hawks FC

Red Rose SC	1−1 (a.e.t.) (5−6 p)	Civil Security SC

Red Sun SC	0−1	Blue Eagles SC

== Quarter-finals ==
The draw for the quarter-finals was held on 8 January 2020. Matches will be played on 11 and 12 January 2020.

Results:

11 January 2020	Civil Security SC	2−5	Police SC	Sugathadasa Stadium
16:00 SLST

11 January 2020	Blue Eagles SC	2−1	Renown SC	Sugathadasa Stadium
18:30 SLST

12 January 2020	Navy Sea Hawks FC	0−1	Saunders SC	Sugathadasa Stadium
16:00 SLST

12 January 2020	Prison SC	0−1	Blue Star SC	Sugathadasa Stadium
18:30 SLST

== Semi-finals ==
The draw for the semi-finals was held on 21 January 2020. Matches were played on 1 February 2020 at the Race Course International Stadium.

Results:

1 February 2020	Saunders SC	5−1	Navy Sea Hawks SC	Colombo Racecourse
16:00 SLST

1 February 2020	Police SC	0−0 (a.e.t.) (4−2 p)	Blue Star SC	Colombo Racecourse
18:30 SLST

== Final ==
Match will be played on 7 February 2020 at the Race Course International Stadium.

Result:

7 February 2020	Saunders SC	1−1 (a.e.t.) (5−6 p)	Police SC	Colombo Racecourse
19:30 SLST
