= Khusain Norchaev =

Uzbek footballer (born 2002)

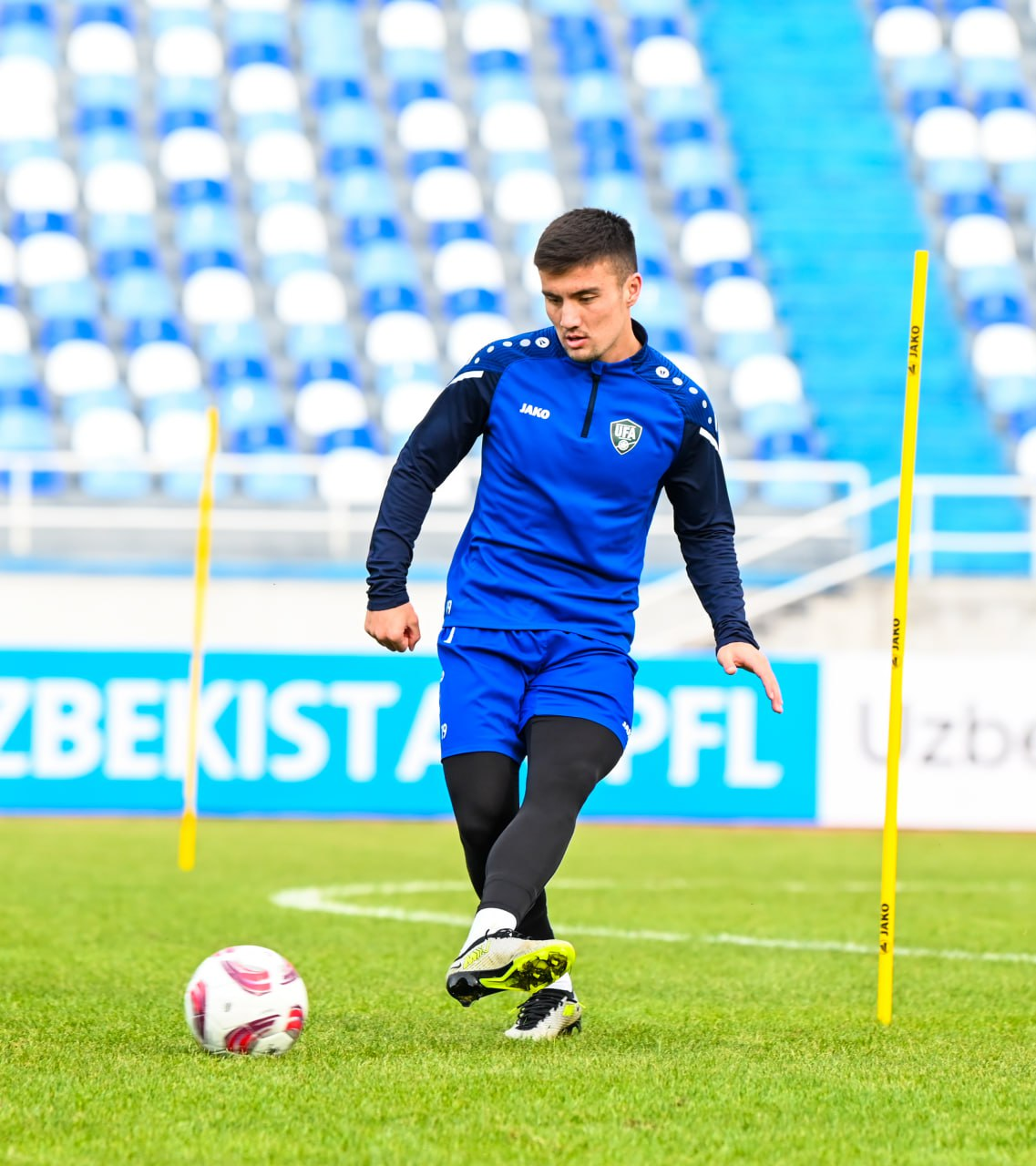

Personal information
- Full name: Xusain Toʻraqul oʻgʻli Norchayev
- Date of birth: 6 February 2002 (age 24)
- Place of birth: Yakkabog, Uzbekistan
- Height: 1.80 m (5 ft 11 in)
- Position: Forward

Team information
- Current team: Navbahor Namangan
- Number: 11

Youth career
- Nasaf-2

Senior career*
Years	Team	Apps	(Gls)
2019–2023	Nasaf	71	(25)
2023–2024	Alania Vladikavkaz	13	(0)
2024	→ Neftchi Fergana (loan)	15	(4)
2025–2026	Nasaf	30	(14)
2026–	Navbahor Namangan	3	(1)

International career^{‡}
2021–	Uzbekistan U-23	31	(14)
2021–	Uzbekistan	5	(4)
Medal record
Representing Uzbekistan
Men's football
AFC U-23 Asian Cup
Silver medal – second place	2022 Uzbekistan	Team
Silver medal – second place	2024 Qatar	Team
Asian Games
Bronze medal – third place	2022 Hangzhou	Team
- * Club domestic league appearances and goals as of 29 July 2026 ‡ National team caps and goals as of 1 October 2026

Khusain Norchaev (Uzbek: Xusain Toʻraqul oʻgʻli Norchayev, Хусаин Тўрақул ўғли Норчаев; born 6 February 2002) is an Uzbek professional footballer who plays as a forward for Uzbekistan Super League club Navbahor Namangan and the Uzbekistan national team.

== Club career ==
On 14 June 2020, he made his debut in the Uzbekistan Super League in a match against Navbahor Namangan, replacing Oybek Bozorov in the 84th minute.

On 23 February 2023, Norchaev signed a 3.5-year contract with Russian First League club Alania Vladikavkaz.

== Career ==
=== International ===
He made his debut for the senior Uzbekistan team on 19 October 2021 in a friendly match against Malaysia.

Uzbekistan national team
Year	Apps	Goals
2021	1	1
2022	0	0
2023	0	0
2024	0	0
2025	2	0
2025	2	2
Total	5	4

Statistics accurate as of match played 1 October 2026.

==== International goals ====
Scores and results list Uzbekistan's goal tally first.

No.	Date	Venue	Opponent	Score	Result	Competition
1.	9 October 2021	Amman International Stadium, Amman, Jordan	Malaysia	3–0	5–1	Friendly
2.	24 September 2026	Istiqlol Stadium, Fergana, Uzbekistan	Iran	3–1	3–1	Friendly
3.	1 October 2026	Pakhtakor Central Stadium, Tashkent, Uzbekistan	Syria	3–0	4–1	Friendly
4.	1 October 2026	Pakhtakor Central Stadium, Tashkent, Uzbekistan	Syria	4–0	4–1	Friendly

== Honours ==
Nasaf

- AFC Cup: runner-up 2021

Individual

- 2021 AFC Cup Top scorer (7 goals)
