= Markaz Shabab Al-Am'ari =

Shabab Al-Am'ari
- Full name: Markaz Shabab Al-Am'ari Al-Reyadi Al-Thaqafi Al-Egtima'y
- Founded: 1953; 73 years ago
- Ground: Al-Beireh Al-Jadeed Stadium, Am'ari, Palestine
- Capacity: 12.500
- League: West Bank Premier League
- 2021–22: 10th
- Website: Palestinian Amari Youth Center on Instagram
Home colours

Markaz Shabab Al-Am'ari (Arabic: مركز شباب الأمعري) is a football club based in Am'ari, a refugee camp in Palestine. The club plays in the West Bank Premier League. Their home venue is the Faisal Al-Husseini International Stadium, which has a seating capacity of 12,500.

== History ==
This club was founded in 1953 at Al-Am'ari refugee camp, located in Ramallah. Markaz Shabab Al-Am'ari is one of oldest club and most successful club in Palestine, with West Bank Premier League trophy two times in 1997 and 2011. In continentals, their best performance is runner-up at AFC President's Cup in 2012 after losing in the final from Tajikistan's club, FC Istiklol.

== Honours ==
- West Bank Premier League
  - Champions (2): 1997, 2011
- AFC President's Cup
  - Runners-up (1): 2012

== Asian record ==
- AFC President's Cup: 1 appearance

2012: Runners-up

- AFC Cup: 1 appearance

2021: Group stage

=== Continental results ===
Season	Competition	Round	Opponent	Home	Away	Aggregate	Position
2012	AFC President's Cup	Group C	(Turkmenistan) Nebitçi	1–2			2nd
2012	AFC President's Cup	Group C	(Tajikistan) Istiklol	0–1			2nd
2012	AFC President's Cup	Group B 2	(Chinese Taipei) Taiwan Power Company	1–1			1st
2012	AFC President's Cup	Group B 2	(Pakistan) Khan Research Laboratories	5–1			1st
2012	AFC President's Cup	Final	(Tajikistan) Istiklol	1–2			Runners-up
2021	AFC Cup	Group C	(Jordan) Al-Faisaly	2–0			4th
2021	AFC Cup	Group C	Al-Kuwait	4–1			4th
2021	AFC Cup	Group C	(Syria) Tishreen	5–1			4th
