= COVID-19 pandemic in Oman =

- Disease: COVID-19
- Pathogen: SARS-CoV-2
- Location: Oman
- First outbreak: Wuhan, Hubei, China
- Index case: Muscat
- Arrival date: 24 February 2020 (6 years, 8 months and 3 days)
- Confirmed cases: 399,449
- Recovered: 394,821
- Deaths: 4,628
- Vaccinations: 2,336,980 (66%) (total doses given); 1,294,098 (37%) (at least one dose); 1,042,882 (29%) (two doses)

Government website
- www.covid19.moh.gov.om

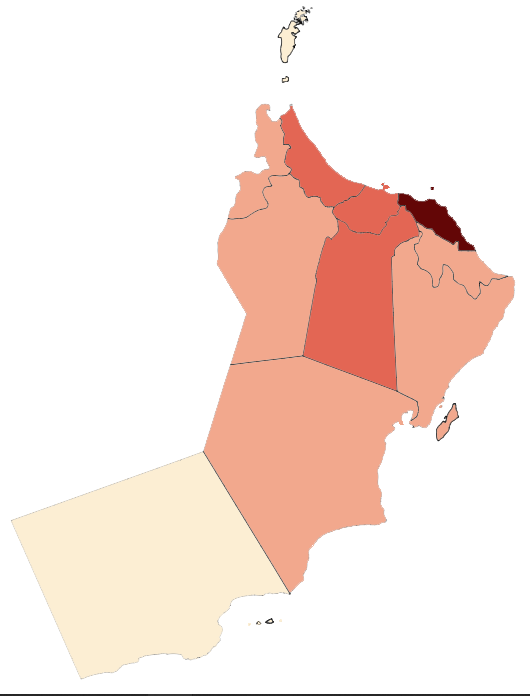

The COVID-19 pandemic in Oman was a part of the worldwide pandemic of coronavirus disease 2019 (COVID-19) caused by severe acute respiratory syndrome coronavirus 2 (SARS-CoV-2). The virus was confirmed to have reached Oman on 24 February 2020 when two citizens tested positive for COVID-19 after returning from Iran. As of 21 August 2021, the total number of cases registered in the sultanate is 300,914, of which 289,450 have recovered and 4,020 have died. Initially, most of the cases and deaths occurred in the expatriate community. By July 2020, as the pandemic entered its fourth month in the country, most of the cases and deaths had occurred among the citizens.

Muscat continues to be the most affected governorate with the highest number of confirmed cases at over 149,383 and 1,354 deaths, and accounted for 76% of the total cases in the country by early June 2020, with most of the cases being in the expatriate community. On 10 April 2020, the entire governorate was put under lockdown until 22 April, this was extended twice, with the lockdown being lifted on 29 May.

Starting 13 June 2020, lockdowns were imposed in the governorate of Dhofar, the wilayat of Masirah, the wilayat of Duqm and the areas of Jebel Akhdar and Jebel Shams until 3 July 2020. Various national level lockdowns and movement bans have since been imposed over the course of the pandemic.

As per directives issued by Sultan Haitham bin Tariq, COVID-19 tests and treatment were initially free for all communities of the sultanate, including expatriates. As of August 2021, Oman has vaccinated a total of 66% of its populations in terms of both first and second doses administered.

== Background ==
On 12 January, the World Health Organization (WHO) confirmed that a novel coronavirus was the cause of a respiratory illness in a cluster of people in Wuhan, Hubei, China, who had initially come to the attention of the WHO on 31 December 2019.

Unlike SARS of 2003, the case fatality ratio for COVID-19 has been much lower, but the transmission has been significantly greater, with a significant total death toll.

== Timeline ==
Cases

Deaths

=== February 2020 ===
On 24 February, the first two cases of COVID-19 were confirmed. These cases involved two Omani women who had returned from Iran. On 27 February, the number of cases in Oman increased to 6. The cases were also linked to recent travel to Iran.

=== March 2020 ===
To prevent community infections, the country placed 2,367 people under quarantine in early March. Most of the people were under domestic quarantine while 49 were in institutional quarantine. By mid March, the total number of cases in the country were 22. On 16 March, the Royal Hospital in the capital stopped treatment services provided for routine non-emergency cases until further notice.

The total number of cases surged over 100 on 26 March, Dr. Mohammed bin Said Al Hosni, Undersecretary of Ministry of Health stated in an interview that the country had "entered the community transmission stage of coronavirus and we expect to see the numbers increase over the coming period." The government announced the same day that any individuals on a residency permit, visit, business or any short term visas need not worry about expiry-related issues. Due to the pandemic, they would not be subject to any fines or legal actions regarding overstaying in the country. On 28 March, 255 Omanis comprising students, tourists, and business people were airlifted from Jordan in two special planes to return home.

Two banks in the sultanate, Bank Dhofar and the National Bank of Oman each pledged a contribution of OMR 1 million in support of the health services fighting against the spread of the novel coronavirus in Oman in late March, while Bank Nizwa pledged OMR 600,000 of which OMR 3000,000 was set aside for the Ministry of Health.

By the end of the month, 7,646 suspect cases were put under home quarantine including citizens and expatriates, and the sultanate had registered a total of 192 confirmed cases with 34 recoveries and no deaths. The capital city, Muscat, remained the region with the highest number of cases with over 100 cases.

=== April 2020 ===
On 1 April, the first death due to coronavirus was recorded in the country. The patient was a 72-year-old Omani citizen in Muscat, and the number of confirmed cases in the country crossed over 200. Also on the day, Al Nahda Hospital in the capital, Muscat announced the suspension of all outpatient appointments and surgical appointments until further notice. The wilayat of Muttrah was isolated from other parts of Muscat the same day due to a sharp increase in the number of cases. The Sultan's Armed Forces (SAF) and Royal Oman Police (ROP) started to enforce joint checkpoints on the roads linking the entrances and exits of the sultanate's governorates the same day. These were halted on 28 April.

Muttrah became the worst affected wilayat (province) of the governorate and the country as it held 45% of the total confirmed cases of the country mostly due to local transmissions, and hence was isolated on 1 April 2020.

The Sultan Qaboos University (SQU) decided to implement e-learning on 2 April starting from 12 April. Oman LNG pledged RO6 million to support the national health sector and Ministry of Health to stem the pandemic in Oman on 5 April. A total of OMR 2 million of this was contributed to the fund set up by the Supreme Committee. The same day, the Public Authority for Consumer Protection (PACP), in coordination with commercial centers, launched an initiative called 'Sallat al Khair', aimed at helping families whose lives have been affected by the measures to combat COVID-19. Under the initiative, 19 different commodities to meet the basic weekly consumer needs were provided in one basket for OMR 9.

The youngest patient in the country, a one-and-half-year-old baby boy recovered and was discharged from the hospital on 7 April. On 8 April, the total number of confirmed cases crossed 400. As most of them were in the capital city of Muscat, the Supreme Committee decided to put it under lockdown from 10 April to 22 April. The Ministry of Foreign Affairs reported the same day that around 3,000 Omani citizens had returned from various countries so far and another 600 are also to return soon. By the end of the 'return campaign' implemented as per directives of the Supreme Committee, a total of 3,746 willing Omanis were brought back from different countries. This marked the end of the campaign as the remaining Omanis abroad had preferred to stay in their respective host countries.

On 9 April, the Minister of Health, Dr Ahmed al Saeedi announced that as per directives issued by Sultan Haitham, COVID-19 tests and treatment were made absolutely free for all communities of the sultanate, including expatriates. It was also declared that no legal action would be taken for individuals whose visas or resident permits had expired. Mass testing was also started from 11 April. The tally reached 457 on the day and the Ministry of Health disclosed that the highest percentage of local transmission had occurred in Muttrah, with a total of 206 cases recorded in the district alone. The national tally crossed 500 on 11 April when 62 new confirmed cases were recorded. The total number of cases stood at 546. The Ministry of Health reported on 14 April that it had successfully performed a procedure of convalescent plasma extraction and transfusion from people who had recovered from COVID-19 as a treatment option for the critically ill.

The total number of confirmed cases surged over 1,000 to 1,019 when 109 new cases were reported on 16 April. Also on the day, the commercial market area adjoining the main hospital in the wilayat (province) of Jalan Bani Bu Ali in Ash Sharqiyah South Governorate was locked down until further notice after 12 cases were confirmed due to community transmission. The Minister of Health, Dr Ahmed al Saeedi stated the same day that the sultanate could reach the peak of the outbreak during late April where 500 cases per day would be expected. He also revealed that most of the cases were in the expatriate community at over 600 and that the current mortality rate of COVID-19 in the country was at 0.04%. Between 16 and 17 April, around 350 Pakistani prisoners in Oman were repatriated to Pakistan via special flights after the Sultan had pardoned them.

86 new cases were confirmed on 19 April, most of these, 71, were expatriates. With this, the number of cases in Muscat crossed 1,000 and the total cases around the sultanate stood at 1,266. The Sultan's Armed Forces, with the help of the Royal Navy of Oman (RNO), operated a number of navy ships to the Musandam Governorate for shipping fuel tankers as well as essential commodities and staple foods for the citizens and residents on 19 April.

As the cases in Muscat grew over 1,100 in late April, the supreme committee extend the lockdown of the governorate until 8 May, while also declaring a nationwide ban on all social, sporting and cultural gatherings and activities during the month of Ramadan. The Ministry of Health reported that a total of 36,000 tests had been conducted by 27 April.

The supreme committee announced new decisions on 28 April for restarting of some commercial businesses effective from the day. These included vehicle repair and rental shops, stationary stores, and electrical appliances shops among others. The Supreme Committee held its fifth e-press-conference on 30 April and revealed that the number of cases was high in the Al Batinah South governorate due to community transmission, stating that a single case had transmitted the virus among dozens. It also informed that an expatriate had left the Muscat governorate for another governorate and hence had caused over 50 infections in the latter.

By the end of the month, more than 40,400 tests had been conducted around the country, there were a total of 2,348 confirmed cases with 495 recoveries and 11 deaths. Majority of the cases, 62% were in the expatriate community while the local population accounted for 38%. At a total of 1,668 cases, Muscat had the highest number of cases among all the governorates.

=== May 2020 ===
On 4 May, the Wadi Kabir Industrial Area in the governorate of Muscat was closed down until further notice. On 5 May, the supreme committee extended the ongoing lockdown in Muscat from its scheduled end on 8 May to 29 May. A decision to end the 2019–2020 school year was also issued, so that May 7, 2020 would be the last day of the school year. The Ministry of Health also confirmed on that day that some of the cases in the country had occurred from home deliveries.

The first death outside the Muscat governorate was reported on 5 May, in the North Batina governorate. The total confirmed cases in the Muscat governorate surpassed over 2,000 on 6 May. On 8 May, the total number of recoveries crossed 1,000. The total tally of confirmed cases in the sultanate surged over 5,000 on 16 May.

A press conference held by the supreme committee outlined various punishments and fines for violators of guidelines which had been issued so far, including imprisonment for all violators for 48 hours. It was also announced that 25 patients had received plasma treatment so far of which 18 had recovered. The Minister of Health stated that the fatality rate was higher in the expatriate community as they reached hospitals later. On 22 May, the total number of cases in Muscat governorate surpassed over 5,000, while the cases crossed over 1,000 in two of its wilayat, Baushar and Seeb.

The total number of cases surpassed over 10,000 on 30 May. Lockdown in Muscat was lifted on 29 May but the wilayat of Muttrah remained isolated with various checkpoints in place per decisions taken by the supreme committee.

Oman recorded more than 1,000 new cases in a single since the beginning of the outbreak on 31 May, the record being 1,014. At the end of the month, the total number of cases stood at 11,437, of which a total of 2,396 had recovered while 49 had died, while over 100,000 tests had been conducted.

=== June 2020 ===
On 1 June, as the total cases in Oman crossed 12,000, the health minister stated that the rise in cases over the past few days was due to various Ramadan and Eid gatherings, saying, "if you look at the figures, the cases began to increase during the second half of Ramadan and then it just shot up during Eid because people are flouting the social distancing rules and they are still gathering."

The total number of cases in the Muscat governorate crossed 10,000 on 3 June, accounting for 75.8% of the total cases in Oman by this day. By early June 2020, over 5,000 cases had been reported in Muttrah alone. The wilayat remained under isolation even after the lockdown in the Muscat governorate was lifted.

The sanitary isolation in the wilayat of Muttrah was lifted in most of its parts on 6 June. Five new places in the country were placed under lockdown on 13 June, the governorate of Dhofar, the wilayat of Masirah, the wilayat of Duqm and the areas of Jebel Akhdar and Jebel Shams until 3 July. Data reported by the Ministry of Health until 9 June showed that majority of the COVID-19 cases and deaths due to it have been reported in the expatriate community. Of the total 18,198 cases reported in the country by that day, 11,107 or 61% were among expatriates, while of the total 83 deaths, 53 were expatriates.

The supreme committee allowed a number of commercial activities and services to reopen on 10 June. At a press conference held by the supreme committee on 11 June, it was revealed that the rate of the spread of infection in the wilayat of Muttrah had decreased from 60% to 35%.

On 14 June, the total death toll in the country due to COVID-19 crossed 100, while the wilayat of Seeb surpassed Muttrah in total number of cases at over 5,600. On 15 June, the country once again recorded more than 1,000 new cases at a total of 1,043. The undersecretary of Minister of Health stated the same day that Oman is yet to reach the peak of infections.

From mid to late June, Oman recorded more than 1,000 new cases in a single day multiple times. The country recorded the highest single day increase in cases since the beginning of the outbreak on 22 June, with a total of 1,605 new cases, taking the total number of cases over 31,000. By end of June, there were a total of 40,070 cases in the country with 23,425 recoveries and 176 deaths.

== Response and prevention measures ==
=== March 2020 ===
In early March, the Ministry of Health directed all retail outlets, including shopping malls and supermarkets, to install sanitizers as a preventive measure against the spread of coronavirus. Sultan Haitham formed a supreme committee tasked with dealing and responding to the developments resulting from the outbreak. On 12 March, the committee decided that tourist visas will not be issued to citizens of all countries and also stopped entry and docking of cruise ships in country's ports. Furthermore, all sports events were cancelled, court attendance limited to essential personnel and the sale of shisha prohibited in restaurants and cafes. These measures were implemented on March 15 for a period of 30 days.

On 14 March, the committee decided to suspend all classes in schools, universities and other educational institutions from 15 March for 30 days. This decision was revised in early April by the Supreme Committee and a decision was taken for the suspension to remain until further notice. Another meeting held on the next day pronounced new restrictions which included stopping the entry of foreigners apart from GCC citizens and foreign residents via all land and sea borders, quarantining all arrivals and the closures of public parks and gardens. It was also declared that Friday prayers are to be stopped and social gatherings like weddings are banned. The decisions went into effect on 17 March. Multiple museums around the country were also closed on the day indefinitely.

Starting 18 March, the Sulthanate imposed further restrictions. The entry to the country was restricted only to Omani nationals, and nationals were not allowed to depart to other countries. All places of worship, including mosques were closed. All gatherings, events and conferences were suspended. The government banned public gatherings at all tourism sites as well as closure of cinemas, gyms, sport clubs, barber shops and all shops in shopping malls apart from foodstuff and medical outlets. The popular souqs at various locations around the country such as Muttrah, Nizwa, Al Rustaq and Sinaw were also ordered to be shut down. Restaurants and coffee shops were also banned from serving food and only allowed takeaway services. Also on the day, The Central Bank of Oman issued a number of directives to all licensed banks and financing leasing companies operating in Oman that it is expected to provide additional available liquidity in a range of OMR 8 billion, to overcome the prevailing economic conditions.

During mid March, the Royal Oman Police provided an integrated medical team to operate the mobile hospital affiliated to the Directorate General of Medical Services to handle the field cases and suspected cases of COVID-19. On 19 March, all public transport apart from buses and ferries heading to the Governorate of Musandam and the Wilayat of Masirah was suspended.

On 21 March, legal action including detainment was taken against individuals spreading false information regarding the pandemic. Starting from 23 March, the Royal Oman Police stopped all customer services related to civil status, traffic, passports and residency until further notice. The Supreme Committee further issued new measures on 22 March. These included reducing the number of employees present in workplaces in government agencies to not more than 30%, preventing gatherings of all kinds in public places, closures of money exchange services with only banks being responsible for those now along with customer services outlets in all public and private institutions. On 24 March, the Ministry of Health issued an order for pharmacies to dispense medicine and other items only through the duty window on their main door to stem the outbreak. The Ministry of Transport on Tuesday decided to reduce the number of passengers in taxis in the sultanate from three to two passengers, excluding the taxi driver until further notice the same day.

Sultan Haitham donated OMR 10 million for tackling the coronavirus outbreak in the country on 26 March. The National Youth Committee of the country called-on volunteers to aid in the relief and sheltering measures to combat coronavirus (COVID-19) on the same day. Also on the day, the Ministry of Tourism stated that over 40 hotels across the sultanate had provided around 2,816 hotel rooms to be used as COVID-19 relief and shelters under the supervision of the Ministry of Health. They were to be mainly used as institutional quarantine centres for Omanis arriving from abroad. To prevent community infection, the hotels were divided into three categories, some for asymptomatic individuals, others for suspected cases while a number were dedicated for medical treatment of infected cases.

To further aid in steps to curb the outbreak, medical materials were brought in from the Chinese city of Shenzhen with the help of the Royal Air Force of Oman on 27 March. These included a number of reagents and solutions that match the standards set by the World Health Organization, as well as personal protective equipment and lab screening tests. The Royal Army of Oman activated emergency plans and formed field teams to conduct disinfection and sterilization of roads and public places across the sultanate. To stem community infections, the government closed fish markets in three governorates of North Batinah, South Batinah and Ash Sharqiyah South on 28 March until further notice. The Ministry of Health issued guidelines on 29 March including a "checklist" of protocols, facilities, and measures that private hospitals and clinics must have in place to help prevent, control and manage suspected or confirmed COVID-19 infections on their premises. This resulted in a number of private clinics shutting across the sultanate. The same day, the Public Prosecution (PP) said that nine people were arrested for spreading rumors on COVID-19 while four cases of violations of the measures were also recorded. The violations included gatherings for the purpose of mourning, group prayers, and the practice of suspended professions and disobeying the rules of home quarantine. Bank Dhofar and the National Bank of Oman each pledged a contribution of OMR 1 million in support of the health services fighting against the spread of the novel coronavirus in Oman on 29 March.

On 30 March, the Public Prosecution said that nine individuals were arrested and held in custody for spreading rumors on COVID-19 while four cases of violations of the measures imposed were also recorded. Warrants for the arrest of 11 defendants for violating the procedures of home isolation were also issued, they were arrested and sent for institutional isolation. Also on the day, the Ministry of Commerce and Industry announced that it had successfully produced medical equipment using 3D printing technology as part of the national efforts to combat the pandemic. By 31 March, a total of 2016 individuals were put under institutional quarantine.

=== April 2020 ===
Starting 1 April, the country restricted movement between the governorates by installing checkpoints on entry and exit points on the roads. The only exemptions allowed included ambulances and emergency vehicles, military and security vehicles, vehicles transporting foodstuffs and other essentials and vehicles transporting commercial and construction materials, petroleum derivatives and other materials used by the public and private sectors. Essential public and private sector employees were also allowed to enter and leave the regions. The checkpoints were removed on 28 April. The Directorate-General of Muscat Municipality also launched precautionary and preventive spraying campaign in the wilayat of Seeb in an effort to combat the spread of the pandemic on the same day. Also on 1 April, the wilayat of Muttrah was isolated from other parts of Muscat. Entry and exit of people was put on a halt after a sharp increase in the number of cases in the region. The Minister of Health, Dr. Ahmed Mohammed Al Saidi stated, "Muttrah was closed because it is the centre of the coronavirus infection, and because social transmission had begun there." The Sultan's Armed Forces (SAF) and Royal Oman Police (ROP) also started to enforce joint checkpoints on the roads linking the entrances and exits of the sultanate's governorates the same day.

The Muscat Municipality cleansed and sterilised the Central Market of Vegetables and Fruits in Mawaleh as a precaution on 4 April. Oman LNG pledged OMR 6 million to support the national health sector and Ministry of Health to stem the pandemic in Oman on 5 April. A total of OMR 2 million of this was contributed to the fund set up by the Supreme Committee. Meanwhile, the Directorate General of Health Services in Dhofar set up a hotline to receive people's concern about COVID-19 and give them necessary health instructions.

On 8 April, the Supreme Committee decided to enforce lockdown in Muscat from 10 April until 22 April through the activation of control checkpoints. This was later extended until 8 May. To get as many people as possible tested, the government announced that no legal action would be taken against expats who had outstayed their visas or whose resident permits had expired on 9 April. Furthermore, it was declared by the Sultan that all tests and treatments are absolutely free for all communities of Oman, including foreigners.

The Salalah Medical Supplies Manufacturing (SMSM) announced on 11 April that it had increased its production capacity to meet the increasing demand for face masks, gloves and other medical supplies in Oman. CEO of the firm stated that two million gloves and 100,000 face masks per day would be produced for both private and public health sectors.

By mid-April, more than 15,000 COVID-19 tests were carried out in the worst-affected district of Muttrah, and 6 testing centers were opened there to increase testing. On 16 April, the commercial market area adjoining the main hospital in the wilayat (province) of Jalan Bani Bu Ali in Ash Sharqiyah South Governorate was locked down until further notice after 12 community transmission cases were confirmed.

The Ministry of Health procured 1 million hydroxychloroquine pills from India on 20 April. Although there have been no confirmed cases in Al Wusta Governorate yet, four locations in total containing 1,000 beds were prepared for institutional isolation and medical care purposes related to COVID-19 in the main province of Duqm by late April. The Dhofar Municipality cancelled the popular Salalah Tourism Festival for the year 2020 to prevent the outbreak further on 20 April.

A temporary test centre was opened in Muscat for expatriates only on 22 April. The Royal Hospital launched a virtual clinic service the same day to enable the patients to communicate with doctors remotely by a phone call to get an assessment for their condition and getting a treatment plan. A statement issued by the Government Communication Center (GC) on 28 April stated that a total of 27 institutional isolation centres had been set up across the country. 8 of these were for suspected cases, 9 for uninfected individuals and 10 were allocated for confirmed COVID-19 patients.

=== May — July 2020 ===
The Al Wadi Al Kabir Industrial Area in the governorate of Muscat was closed until further notice on 4 May. On 5 May, the supreme committee extended the ongoing lockdown in Muscat from its scheduled end on 8 May to 29 May.

The upcoming Eid-ul-Fitr congregational prayers and celebrations in the country were banned by the supreme committee on 18 May. New directives were also issued which made wearing of face mask mandatory in public, while some businesses were allowed to resume operations provided these adhered to preventive measures apart from those in Muttrah and Al Wadi Al Kabir industrial area.

A press conference held by the supreme committee on 21 May outlined a number of fines to be issued for violators of multiple guidelines issued so far. All the amount collected from fines was reserved for the national fund to fight the pandemic in the country. Violators of guidelines would also be imprisoned for 48 hours. The committee stated that imprisonment for up to six months, fines and deportations sentences had also been issued for some violators. It was also announced that a total of OMR 28.4 million had been collected in the fund so far.

Fines to be issued for violations	Amount (OMR)
Non-compliance with the closure of shops which the committee has decided to close.	OMR 3,000
Organisers of prohibited gatherings, including Eid gatherings, weddings, funerals, congregations at the places of worship, and other types of gatherings.	OMR 1,500
Refraining from wearing or damage of the tracking bracelet.	OMR 300
Refraining from taking the coronavirus tests.	OMR 200
Violating home and institutional quarantines.	OMR 200
Attendees of prohibited gatherings.	OMR 100
Refraining from wearing masks while in public.	OMR 20

A total of 34 expatriates were arrested in Al Ansab in the Muscat governorate on 22 May for playing cricket, as a ban had been placed on all gatherings including sports in public places since a couple of months ago by the supreme committee. Oman marked its first day of Eid-ul-Fitr on 24 May and a ban had been issued on all eid gatherings including prayer congregations, despite this multiple expatriates organised and attended the prayers. As a result, as many as 40 were arrested for organising while another 136 were arrested for attending in the governorates of Muscat and Al Dakhiliya.

Five new places in the country were placed under lockdown on 13 June, the governorate of Dhofar, the wilayat of Masirah, the wilayat of Duqm and the areas of Jebel Akhdar and Jebel Shams until 3 July. As the cases continued to surge in the wilayat of Seeb by mid June, the Ministry of Health opened a fourth testing center which received expatriates.

On 2 July, the Ministry of Health announced that it would launch a national survey lasting 10 weeks for the entire population of the country to measure the prevalence of the pandemic. The survey would start on 12 July and would include collection of demographic data as well as blood sample to examine the antibodies produced by COVID-19 patients.

=== March 2021 ===
In March 2021, Oman imposed a curfew from March 28 until April 8 from 8 p.m. to 5 a.m. and an evening ban on all commercial activities imposed on March 1 will be extended.

=== April 2021 ===
In April 2021, during the holy month of Ramadan, all gatherings were prohibited from 9 p.m. until 4 a.m. due to a night-time ban.

=== Flight suspensions ===
The national carrier, Oman Air suspended its flights to multiple countries. On 9 March, all flights to and from Milan, Italy were stopped until further notice. On 12 March, flights between Saudi Arabia and the sultanate were cancelled until further notice. All flights were cancelled to Bahrain and Egypt starting 19 March until further notice. On 22 March, three new countries were added to the list, India until 28 March, Nepal until 31 March and Pakistan until 4 April. Flights were also suspended to Turkey from 25 March until 31 March.

On 29 March, Omani Air effectively suspended all flights to and from the country until further notice as per decided by the Supreme Committee. The only exception to this was the domestic flights to and from Musandam and its cargo services.

Oman reopened its airports on 1 October with mandatory testing and quarantine restrictions for incoming travelers in place.

== Statistics ==
Updated daily according to the data provided on the website and the official Twitter account of the Ministry of Health.

Cumulative number of cases, recoveries and deaths (monthly)

View source data.

Cases per day

View source data.

Deaths per day

View source data.

Cases by Governorates

View source data.

Cases and deaths by population

View source data.
View source data.

Cases and deaths by gender

View source data.
View source data.
