= Bangladesh national football team results (2020–present) =

Match results (2020–present)

This article lists the results for the Bangladesh national football team from 2020 to the present.

== Results ==
Key
Win
Draw
Defeat

=== 2020 ===
15 January 2020 2020 Bangabandhu Cup GS	Bangladesh	0–2	Palestine	Dhaka, Bangladesh
17:00 UTC+6		Report	Salem 28'; Kharoub 58'	Stadium: Bangabandhu National Stadium; Attendance: 6,500; Referee: Sudish Pandey (Nepal)

19 January 2020 2020 Bangabandhu Cup GS	Sri Lanka	0–3	Bangladesh	Dhaka, Bangladesh
17:00 UTC+6		Report	M. Mia 17', 64'; Ibrahim 83'	Stadium: Bangabandhu National Stadium; Referee: Virendha Rai (Bhutan)

23 January 2020 2020 Bangabandhu Cup SF	Burundi	3–0	Bangladesh	Dhaka, Bangladesh
17:00 UTC+6	Nshimirimana 43', 45+2', 79'	Report		Stadium: Bangabandhu National Stadium; Referee: Sudish Pandey (Nepal)

13 November 2020 Friendly	Bangladesh	2–0	Nepal	Dhaka, Bangladesh
17:00 UTC+6	Jibon 10'; Sufil 80'	Report		Stadium: Bangabandhu National Stadium; Referee: Bituraj Barua (Bangladesh)

17 November 2020 Friendly	Bangladesh	0–0	Nepal	Dhaka, Bangladesh
17:00 UTC+6		Report		Stadium: Bangabandhu National Stadium; Referee: Mizanur Rahman (Bangladesh)

4 December 2020 2022 WCQ R2	Qatar	5–0	Bangladesh	Doha, Qatar
19:00 UTC+3	Hatem 9'; Afif 33', 90+2'; Ali 72' (pen.), 78'	Report		Stadium: Jassim Bin Hamad Stadium; Attendance: 1,044; Referee: Mohd Amirul Izwan Yaacob (Malaysia)

=== 2021 ===
27 March 2021 2021 Three Nations Cup GS	Nepal	0–0	Bangladesh	Kathmandu, Nepal
18:45 UTC+6		Report		Stadium: Dasarath Rangasala Stadium; Referee: Tejas Nagvenkar (India)

29 March 2021 2021 Three Nations Cup Final	Nepal	2–1	Bangladesh	Kathmandu, Nepal
18:45 UTC+6	S. Rai 18'; B. Rai 42'	Report	Sufil 83'	Stadium: Dasarath Rangasala Stadium; Referee: Tejas Nagvenkar (India)

3 June 2021 2022 WCQ R2	Bangladesh	1–1	Afghanistan	Doha, Qatar
17:00 UTC+3	Barman 83'	Report	Sharifi 47'	Stadium: Jassim Bin Hamad Stadium; Attendance: 300; Referee: Mooud Bonyadifar (Iran)

7 June 2021 2022 WCQ R2	Bangladesh	0–2	India	Doha, Qatar
17:00 UTC+3		Report	Chhetri 79', 90+2'	Stadium: Jassim Bin Hamad Stadium; Attendance: 495; Referee: Zaid Thamer (Iraq)

15 June 2021 2022 WCQ R2	Bangladesh	0–3	Oman	Doha, Qatar
20:00 UTC+3		Report	Al-Ghafri 22'; Al-Hajri 60', 80'	Stadium: Jassim Bin Hamad Stadium; Attendance: 885; Referee: Ali Shaban (Kuwait)

5 September 2021 2021 Three Nations Cup GS	Bangladesh	0–2	Palestine	Bishkek, Kyrgyzstan
20:30 UTC+6		Report	Kharoub 33'; Hamed 47'	Stadium: Dolen Omurzakov Stadium

7 September 2021 2021 Three Nations Cup GS	Kyrgyzstan	4–1	Bangladesh	Bishkek, Kyrgyzstan
20:30 UTC+6	Moldozhunusov 10'; Shukurov 39'; Rustamov 46'; Duyshobekov 89'	Report	Sufil 53'	Stadium: Dolen Omurzakov Stadium

1 October 2021 2021 SAFF Championship RR	Sri Lanka	0–1	Bangladesh	Malé, Maldives
21:00 UTC+5		Report	Barman 56' (pen.)	Stadium: National Football Stadium; Referee: Feras Taweel (Syria)

4 October 2021 2021 SAFF Championship RR	Bangladesh	1–1	India	Malé, Maldives
16:00 UTC+5	Arafat 74'	Report	Chhetri 26'	Stadium: National Football Stadium; Referee: Majed Al-Shamrani (Saudi Arabia)

7 October 2021 2021 SAFF Championship RR	Maldives	2–0	Bangladesh	Malé, Maldives
21:00 UTC+5	Mohamed 55'; Ashfaq 74' (pen.)	Report		Stadium: National Football Stadium; Referee: Yousif Saeed Hassan (Iraq)

13 October 2021 2021 SAFF Championship RR	Bangladesh	1–1	Nepal	Malé, Maldives
16:00 UTC+5	Reza 9'	Report	Bista 88' (pen.)	Stadium: National Football Stadium; Referee: Akhrol Riskullaev (Uzbekistan)

10 November 2021 Prime Minister Mahinda Rajapaksa Trophy GS	Bangladesh	1–1	Seychelles	Colombo, Sri Lanka
15:30 UTC+5:30	M.Ibrahim 17'	Report	B. Labrosse 88'	Stadium: Racecourse Ground; Referee: Kasun Lakmal Weerakkody (Sri Lanka)

13 November 2021 Prime Minister Mahinda Rajapaksa Trophy GS	Bangladesh	2–1	Maldives	Colombo, Sri Lanka
16:30 UTC+5:30	J. Bhuyan 12'; T. Barman 86' (pen.)	Report	A. Ibrahim 33'	Stadium: Racecourse Ground; Referee: Hettikamkanamge Perera (Sri Lanka)

16 November 2021 Prime Minister Mahinda Rajapaksa Trophy GS	Sri Lanka	2–1	Bangladesh	Colombo, Sri Lanka
21:30 UTC+5:30	W. Razeek 25', 90+1' (pen.)	Report	J. Rana 71'	Stadium: Racecourse Ground

=== 2022 ===
24 March 2022 Friendly	Maldives	2–0	Bangladesh	Malé, Maldives
21:00 UTC+5	Raif 38'; Mahudhee 61'	Report		Stadium: National Football Stadium; Attendance: 2,500; Referee: Javiz Mohamed (Maldives)

29 March 2022 Friendly	Bangladesh	0–0	Mongolia	Sylhet, Bangladesh
17:30 UTC+6		Report		Stadium: Sylhet District Stadium; Attendance: 10,000; Referee: Bituraj Barua (Bangladesh)

1 June 2022 Friendly	Indonesia	0–0	Bangladesh	Bandung, Indonesia
20:30 UTC+7		Report		Stadium: Jalak Harupat Stadium; Attendance: 8,615; Referee: Yudi Nurcahya (Indonesia)

8 June 2022 2023 ACQ R3	Bahrain	2–0	Bangladesh	Kuala Lumpur, Malaysia
17:15 UTC+8	Haram 34'; Al-Aswad 42'	Report		Stadium: Bukit Jalil National Stadium; Attendance: 826; Referee: Tejas Nagvenkar (India)

11 June 2022 2023 ACQ R3	Bangladesh	1–2	Turkmenistan	Kuala Lumpur, Malaysia
17:15 UTC+8	Ibrahim 12'	Report	Annadurdyýew 7'; Amanow 77'	Stadium: Bukit Jalil National Stadium; Attendance: 5,598; Referee: Clifford Daypuyat (Philippines)

14 June 2022 2023 ACQ R3	Malaysia	4–1	Bangladesh	Kuala Lumpur, Malaysia
21:00 UTC+8	Safawi 16' (pen.); Cools 38'; Syafiq 47'; Lok 73'	Report	Ibrahim 31'	Stadium: Bukit Jalil National Stadium; Attendance: 52,964; Referee: Zaid Thamer Mohammed (Iraq)

22 September 2022 Friendly	Cambodia	0–1	Bangladesh	Phnom Penh, Cambodia
19:00 UTC+7		Report	Rakib 23'	Stadium: Morodok Techo National Stadium; Attendance: 11,993; Referee: Suhaizi Shukri (Malaysia)

27 September 2022 Friendly	Nepal	3–1	Bangladesh	Kathmandu, Nepal
17:30 UTC+5:45	Bista 18', 27', 38'	Report	Hossain 56'	Stadium: Dasarath Rangasala Stadium; Attendance: 8,665; Referee: Virendha Rai (Bhutan)

=== 2023 ===
25 March 2023 Friendly	Bangladesh	1–0	Seychelles	Sylhet, Bangladesh
15:45 BST (UTC+6)	Tariq 42'	Report		Stadium: Sylhet District Stadium; Attendance: 1,679; Referee: Virendha Rai (Bhutan)

28 March 2023 Friendly	Bangladesh	0–1	Seychelles	Sylhet, Bangladesh
			Mancienne 61' (pen.)	Stadium: Sylhet District Stadium; Attendance: 1,040; Referee: Pema Tshewang (Bhutan)

15 June 2023 Friendly	Cambodia	0–1	Bangladesh	Phnom Penh, Cambodia
18:00 BST (UTC+6)		Report	Mojibur 24'	Stadium: National Olympic Stadium; Attendance: 30,000; Referee: Wiwat Jumpaoon (Thailand)

22 June 2023 2023 SAFF Championship GS	Lebanon	2–0	Bangladesh	Bangalore, India
16:00 BST (UTC+6)	Maatouk 80'; Bader 90+6'	Report		Stadium: Sree Kanteerava Stadium; Attendance: 50; Referee: Crystal John (India)

25 June 2023 2023 SAFF Championship GS	Bangladesh	3–1	Maldives	Bangalore, India
16:00 BST (UTC+6)	Rakib 42'; Tariq 67'; Morsalin 90'	Report	Hamza 17'	Stadium: Sree Kanteerava Stadium; Attendance: 100; Referee: Prajwol Chhetri (Nepal)

28 June 2023 2023 SAFF Championship GS	Bhutan	1–3	Bangladesh	Bangalore, India
20:00 BST (UTC+6)	Dorji 12'	Report	Morsalin 21'; Jigme 30' (o.g.); Rakib 36'	Stadium: Sree Kanteerava Stadium; Referee: Crystal John (India)

1 July 2023 2023 SAFF Championship SF	Kuwait	1–0 (a.e.t.)	Bangladesh	Bengaluru, India
15:00 UTC+5:30	Al-Buloushi 105+2'	Report		Stadium: Sree Kanteerava Stadium; Attendance: 500; Referee: Crystal John (India)

3 September 2023 Friendly	Bangladesh	0–0	Afghanistan	Dhaka, Bangladesh
17:00 UTC+6		Report		Stadium: Bashundhara Kings Arena; Referee: Prakash Nath Shrestha (Nepal)

7 September 2023 Friendly	Bangladesh	1–1	Afghanistan	Dhaka, Bangladesh
17:00 UTC+6	Morsalin 63'	Report	Sharza 53'	Stadium: Bashundhara Kings Arena; Referee: Prajwol Chhetri (Nepal)

12 October 2023 2026 WCQ R1	Maldives	1–1	Bangladesh	Malé, Maldives
17:00 BST (UTC+6)	Nazeem 87'	Report	Saad 90+2'	Stadium: National Football Stadium; Attendance: 2,555; Referee: Seyed Vahid Kazemi (Iran)

17 October 2023 2026 WCQ R1	Bangladesh	2–1 (2–3 agg.)	Maldives	Dhaka, Bangladesh
17:45 BST (UTC+6)	Rakib 11'; Fahim 46'	Report	Aisam 36'	Stadium: Bashundhara Kings Arena; Attendance: 6,729; Referee: Ammar Ebrahim Hasan Mahfoodh (Bahrain)

16 November 2023 2026 WCQ R2 / 2027 ACQ	Australia	7–0	Bangladesh	Melbourne, Australia
15:00 BST (UTC+6)	Souttar 4'; Borrello 20'; Duke 37', 40'; Maclaren 48', 70', 84'	Report		Stadium: Melbourne Rectangular Stadium; Attendance: 20,876; Referee: Ahrol Risqullaev (Uzbekistan)

21 November 2023 2026 WCQ R2 / 2027 ACQ	Bangladesh	1–1	Lebanon	Dhaka, Bangladesh
17:45 BST (UTC+6)	Morsalin 72'	Report	Osman 67'	Stadium: Bashundhara Kings Arena; Attendance: 6,297; Referee: Kim Dae-yong (South Korea)

=== 2024 ===
21 March 2024 2026 WCQ R2 / 2027 ACQ	Bangladesh	0–5	Palestine	Kuwait City, Kuwait
00:30 BST (UTC+6)		Report	Dabbagh 43', 53', 77'; Qunbar 45+1', 49'	Stadium: Jaber Al-Ahmad International Stadium, Attendance: 37,432; Referee: Shen Yinhao (China)

26 March 2024 2026 WCQ R2 / 2027 ACQ	Bangladesh	0–1	Palestine	Dhaka, Bangladesh
15:30 BST (UTC+6)	Termanini 90+4'	Report		Stadium: Bashundhara Kings Arena; Attendance: 5,195; Referee: Nasrullo Kabirov (Tajikistan)

6 June 2024 2026 WCQ R2 / 2027 ACQ	Bangladesh	0–2	Australia	Dhaka, Bangladesh
16:45 BST (UTC+6)		Report	Hrustic 29'; Yengi 62'	Stadium: Bashundhara Kings Arena; Attendance: 5,227; Referee: Jansen Foo (Singapore)

11 June 2024 2026 WCQ R2 / 2027 ACQ	Bangladesh	0–4	Lebanon	Al Rayyan, Qatar (Note: Lebanon will play all their home matches at a neutral venue until further notice, due to the adjacent Gaza war.)
22:00 BST (UTC+6)		Report	Maatouk 5' (pen.), 49', 60'; Matar 45+2'	Stadium: Khalifa International Stadium; Attendance: 13,721; Referee: Razlan Joffri Ali (Malaysia)

5 September 2024 Friendly	Bangladesh	1–0	Bhutan	Thimphu, Bhutan
18:00 UTC+6	Morsalin 5'	Report		Stadium: Changlimithang Stadium; Referee: Prajwol Chhetri (Nepal)

8 September 2024 Friendly	Bangladesh	0–1	Bhutan	Thimphu, Bhutan
18:00 UTC+6		Report	Wangchuk 90+1'	Stadium: Changlimithang Stadium; Referee: Prajwol Chhetri (Nepal)

13 November 2024 Friendly	Bangladesh	0–1	Maldives	Dhaka, Bangladesh
18:00 BST (UTC+6)		Report	Fasir 18'	Stadium: Bashundhara Kings Arena; Referee: Virendha Rai (Bhutan)

16 November 2024 Friendly	Bangladesh	2–1	Maldives	Dhaka, Bangladesh
18:00 BST (UTC+6)	Jony 43'; Papon 90+4'	Report	Fasir 23'	Stadium: Bashundhara Kings Arena; Referee: Virendha Rai (Bhutan)

=== 2025 ===
25 March 2027 ACQ – 3R	Bangladesh	0–0	India	Shillong, India
19:00 UTC+5:30		Report		Stadium: Jawaharlal Nehru Stadium; Attendance: 14,952; Referee: Hussein Abo Yehia (Lebanon)

4 June 2025 Friendly	Bangladesh	2–0	Bhutan	Dhaka, Bangladesh
19:00 BST (UTC+6)	Hamza 6'; Sohel 50'	Report		Stadium: National Stadium; Attendance: 17,641; Referee: Kasun Lakmal Weerakkody (Sri Lanka)

10 June 2025 2027 ACQ – 3R	Bangladesh	1–2	Singapore	Dhaka, Bangladesh
19:00 BST (UTC+6)	Rakib 67'	Report	Song Ui-young 45'; Ikhsan 58'	Stadium: National Stadium; Attendance: 21,317; Referee: Clifford Daypuyat (Philippines)

6 September 2025 Friendly	Bangladesh	0–0	Nepal	Kathmandu, Nepal
17:45 BST (UTC+6)		Report		Stadium: Dasarath Rangasala Stadium; Referee: Ugyen Penjor (Bhutan)

9 September 2025 Friendly	Bangladesh	Cancelled	Nepal	Kathmandu, Nepal
17:45 BST (UTC+6)				Stadium: Dasarath Rangasala Stadium
Note: Cancelled due to the 2025 Nepalese Gen Z protests.

9 October 2025 2027 ACQ – 3R	Bangladesh	3–4	Hong Kong	Dhaka, Bangladesh
20:00 BST (UTC+6)	Choudhury 13'; Morsalin 84'; Shome 90+9'	Report	Camargo 45+4'; Merkies 50', 75', 90+11'	Stadium: National Stadium; Attendance: 22,343; Referee: Saud Al Samhan (Kuwait)

14 October 2025 2027 ACQ – 3R	Bangladesh	1–1	Hong Kong	Kowloon, Hong Kong
18:00 BST (UTC+6)	Rakib 84'	Report	Orr 36' (pen.)	Stadium: Kai Tak Sports Park Main Stadium; Attendance: 45,489; Referee: Hiroki Kasahara (Japan)

13 November 2025 Friendly	Bangladesh	2–2	Nepal	Dhaka, Bangladesh
20:00 BST	Hamza 46', 50' (pen.)	Report	Chand 29'; Tamang 90+3'	Stadium: National Stadium; Referee: Kasun Lakmal Weerakkody (Sri Lanka)

18 November 2027 ACQ – 3R	Bangladesh	1–0	India	Dhaka, Bangladesh
20:00	Morsalin 11'	Report		Stadium: National Stadium; Attendance: 23,712; Referee: Clifford Daypuyat (Philippines)

=== 2026 ===
26 March 2026 Friendly^{1}	Bangladesh	0–3	Vietnam	Hanoi, Vietnam
18:00 UTC+6		Report	Phạm Tuấn Hải 8'; Phạm Xuân Mạnh 18'; Nguyễn Hai Long 38'	Stadium: Hàng Đẫy Stadium; Referee: Cheung Wai Lung Mario (Hong Kong)

31 March 2026 2027 ACQ – 3R	Bangladesh	0–1	Singapore	Kallang, Singapore
18:00 UTC+6		Report; Report (AFC)	H. Stewart 31'	Stadium: National Stadium; Attendance: 30,105; Referee: Ben Abraham (Australia)

5 June 2026 Friendly	Bangladesh	2–1	San Marino	Serravalle, San Marino
19:00 CEST (23:00 BST)	T. Barman 19', 86'	GSA; UEFA	Giacopetti 31'	Stadium: San Marino Stadium; Attendance: 2,934; Referee: Walter Altmann (Austria)

25 September 2026 2026 FIFA ASEAN Cup; Premier Division Group A	Bangladesh	0–3	Malaysia	Jakarta, Indonesia
15:00 MYT (14:00 BST)		Report	Arif 18', 37'; Bérgson 52'	Stadium: Gelora Bung Karno Stadium; Referee: Resul Mammedov (Turkmenistan)

28 September 2026 2026 FIFA ASEAN Cup; Division 1 Group A	Singapore	0–1	Bangladesh	Jakarta, Indonesia
15:00 MYT (14:00 BST)	H. Stewart 35'	Report		Stadium: Gelora Bung Karno Stadium; Referee: Mongkolchai Pechsri (Thailand)

1 October 2026 2026 FIFA ASEAN Cup; Premier Division Group A	Indonesia	9–2	Bangladesh	Jakarta, Indonesia
17:30 MYT (16:30 BST)	Baker 11', 20', 37', 42', 90+7'; Ridho 32'; Hubner 45+1'; Vickery 90'; Diks 90+6'	Report	Emon 36'; Wahid 90+1'	Stadium: Gelora Bung Karno Stadium; Referee: Nasrullo Kabirov (Tajikistan)

5 November 2026 2026 SAFF Championship GS	Bangladesh	1–0	Bhutan	Dhaka, Bangladesh
20:00 BST	Ibrahim 69'	SAFF; FIFA		Stadium: National Stadium; Attendance: 12,783; Referee: Thoriq Alkatiri (Indonesia)

11 November 2026 2026 SAFF Championship GS	Bangladesh	4–0	Sri Lanka	Dhaka, Bangladesh
20:00 BST	Shome 8'; Choudhury 44'; Wahid 53'; Rakib 87'	SAFF; FIFA		Stadium: National Stadium; Attendance: 18,631; Referee: Lê Vũ Linh (Vietnam)

14 November 2026 2026 SAFF Championship SF	Bangladesh	0–1	Pakistan	Dhaka, Bangladesh
20:00		SAFF; FIFA	Arshad 86'	Stadium: National Stadium; Attendance: 21,983; Referee: Ngô Duy Lân (Vietnam)

== Head to head record ==
As of 5 November 2026

Head to head records
Opponent	P	W	D	L	GF	GA	W%	D%	L%
Afghanistan	3	0	3	0	2	2	0	100	0
Australia	2	0	0	2	0	9	0	0	100
Bahrain	1	0	0	1	0	2	0	0	100
Bhutan	5	4	0	1	7	2	75	0	25
Burundi	1	0	0	1	0	3	0	0	100
Cambodia	2	2	0	0	2	0	100	0	0
Hong Kong	2	0	1	1	4	5	0	50	50
India	4	1	2	1	2	3	25	50	25
Indonesia	2	0	1	2	2	10	0	100	0
Kuwait	1	0	0	1	0	1	0	0	100
Kyrgyzstan	1	0	0	1	1	4	0	0	100
Lebanon	3	0	1	2	1	7	0	33.33	66.67
Malaysia	2	0	0	2	1	7	0	0	100
Maldives	8	4	1	3	10	10	50	12.5	37.5
Mongolia	1	0	1	0	0	0	0	100	0
Nepal	8	1	5	2	7	8	12.5	62.5	25
Oman	1	0	0	1	0	3	0	0	100
Palestine	4	0	0	4	0	10	0	0	100
Qatar	1	0	0	1	0	5	0	0	100
San Marino	1	1	0	0	2	1	100	0	0
Seychelles	3	1	1	1	2	2	33.33	33.33	33.33
Singapore	2	0	0	2	1	3	0	0	100
Sri Lanka	3	2	0	1	5	2	66.67	0	33.33
Turkmenistan	1	0	0	1	1	2	0	0	100
Vietnam	1	0	0	1	0	3	0	0	100
Totals	60	15	16	30	47	90	25	26.67	50

== Notes ==
- ^{1} Non FIFA 'A' international match
