= Palestine national football team results (2020–present) =

This article provides details of international football games played by the Palestine national football team from 2020 to present.

== Results ==
Key
Win
Draw
Defeat

=== 2020 ===
15 January 2020 2020 Bangabandhu Cup	Bangladesh	0–2	Palestine	Dhaka, Bangladesh
17:00 UTC+6		Report	Salem 28'; Kharoub 58'	Stadium: Bangabandhu National Stadium; Referee: Sudish Pandey (Nepal)

17 January 2020 2020 Bangabandhu Cup	Palestine	2–0	Sri Lanka	Dhaka, Bangladesh
17:00 UTC+6	Abu Warda 90+3'; Salem 90+6'	Report		Stadium: Bangabandhu National Stadium; Referee: Yaasin Hanafiah (Malaysia)

22 January 2020 2020 Bangabandhu Cup	Palestine	1–0	Seychelles	Dhaka, Bangladesh
17:00 UTC+6	Kharoub 79'	Report		Stadium: Bangabandhu National Stadium; Referee: Mizanur Rahman (Bangladesh)

25 January 2020 2020 Bangabandhu Cup	Palestine	3–1	Burundi	Dhaka, Bangladesh
16:00 UTC+6	Salem 3'; Maraaba 10'; Kharoub 26'	Report	Ndikumana 60'	Stadium: Bangabandhu National Stadium; Referee: Mizanur Rahman (Bangladesh)

=== 2021 ===
18 January 2021 Friendly	Kuwait	0–1	Palestine	Kuwait City, Kuwait
17:45 UTC+3		Report	Maraaba 71'	Stadium: Jaber Al-Ahmad International Stadium; Referee: Ahmed Al-Ali (Jordan)

30 March 2021 2022 World Cup qualification	Saudi Arabia	5–0	Palestine	Riyadh, Saudi Arabia
20:30 UTC+3	Al-Shahrani 37'; Al-Muwallad 43'; Al-Shehri 52', 58'; Al-Dawsari 88' (pen.)	Report		Stadium: King Saud University Stadium; Referee: Mohanad Qasim (Iraq)

3 June 2021 2022 World Cup qualification	Palestine	4–0	Singapore	Riyadh, Saudi Arabia
21:00 UTC+3	Seyam 19' (pen.), 30' (pen.); Dabbagh 23'; Hamed 85'	Report		Stadium: King Fahd International Stadium; Referee: Mohammed Abdulla Hassan Mohamed (United Arab Emirates)

15 June 2021 2022 World Cup qualification	Palestine	3–0	Yemen	Riyadh, Saudi Arabia
21:00 UTC+3	Dabbagh 43', 84'; Hamed 45+3'	Report		Stadium: King Fahd International Stadium; Referee: Masoud Tufayelieh (Syria)

24 June 2021 2021 FIFA Arab Cup qualification	Palestine	5–1	Comoros	Doha, Qatar
20:00 UTC+3	Kharoub 35'; Dabbagh 42'; Seyam 56', 72'; Batran 81'	Report	Djoumoi 5'	Stadium: Jassim bin Hamad Stadium; Referee: Daniele Doveri (Italy)

2 September 2021 2021 Three Nations Cup	Kyrgyzstan	1–0	Palestine	Bishkek, Kyrgyzstan
20:30 UTC+6	Azarov 26'	Report		Stadium: Dolen Omurzakov Stadium; Referee: Akhrol Riskullaev (Uzbekistan)

5 September 2021 2021 Three Nations Cup	Bangladesh	0–2	Palestine	Bishkek, Kyrgyzstan
20:30 UTC+6		Report	Kharoub 33'; Hamed 47'	Stadium: Dolen Omurzakov Stadium

10 November 2021 Friendly	Palestine	Cancelled	Comoros	Istanbul, Turkey

1 December 2021 2021 FIFA Arab Cup	Morocco	4–0	Palestine	Al Wakrah, Qatar
19:00 UTC+3	Nahiri 31'; Hafidi 56', 64'; Benoun 87' (pen.)	Report		Stadium: Al Janoub Stadium; Referee: Matthew Conger (New Zealand)

4 December 2021 2021 FIFA Arab Cup	Palestine	1–1	Saudi Arabia	Al Rayyan, Qatar
22:00 UTC+3	Rashid 45+2'	Report	Al-Hamdan 81'	Stadium: Education City Stadium; Referee: Said Martínez (Honduras)

7 December 2021 2021 FIFA Arab Cup	Jordan	5–1	Palestine	Doha, Qatar
19:00 UTC+3	Abdel-Rahman 9' (pen.); Al-Dardour 24'; Al-Mardi 82'; Al-Naimat 86', 90+1'	Report	Seyam 44'	Stadium: Stadium 974; Referee: Alireza Faghani (Iran)

=== 2022 ===
8 June 2022 2023 Asian Cup qualification	Palestine	1–0	Mongolia	Ulaanbaatar, Mongolia
17:00 UTC+8	Dabbagh 85' (pen.)	Report		Stadium: MFF Football Centre; Attendance: 1,828; Referee: Shukri Al Hanfosh (Saudi Arabia)

11 June 2022 2023 Asian Cup qualification	Yemen	0–5	Palestine	Ulaanbaatar, Mongolia
17:00 UTC+8		Report	Dabbagh 14'; Rashid 45+2'; Yameen 47'; Chihadeh 58'; Al-Wajih 64' (o.g.)	Stadium: MFF Football Centre; Attendance: 21; Referee: Nazmi Nasaruddin (Malaysia)

14 June 2022 2023 Asian Cup qualification	Palestine	4–0	Philippines	Ulaanbaatar, Mongolia
12:30 UTC+8	Chihadeh 31'; Seyam 42'; Yameen 55'; Abu Warda 72'	Report		Stadium: MFF Football Centre; Attendance: 92; Referee: Mooud Bonyadifar (Iran)

=== 2023 ===
14 June 2023 Friendly	Indonesia	0–0	Palestine	Surabaya, Indonesia
19:30 UTC+7		Report		Stadium: Gelora Bung Tomo Stadium; Attendance: 32,537; Referee: Muhammad Usaid Jamal (Malaysia)

20 June 2023 Friendly	China	2–0	Palestine	Dalian, China
19:35 UTC+8	Wu Lei 34'; Browning 65'	Report		Stadium: Dalian Barracuda Bay Football Stadium; Attendance: 16,151; Referee: Yudai Yamamoto (Japan)

6 September 2023 Friendly	Oman	2–1	Palestine	Muscat, Oman
18:45 UTC+4	Fawaz 22'; Al-Ghassani 36' (pen.)		Abu Warda 3'	Stadium: Sultan Qaboos Sports Complex

11 September 2023 Friendly	Vietnam	2–0	Palestine	Nam Dinh, Vietnam
19:30 UTC+7	Nguyễn Công Phượng 61'; Phạm Tuấn Hải 78'	Report		Stadium: Thiên Trường Stadium; Referee: Muhammad Taqi (Singapore)

13 October 2023 2023 Merdeka Tournament	Palestine	Withdrew	Tajikistan	Kuala Lumpur, Malaysia
				Stadium: Bukit Jalil National Stadium
Note: Match cancelled due to Palestine pulling out following the Gaza war.

16 November 2023 2026 World Cup qualification R2	Lebanon	0–0	Palestine	Sharjah, United Arab Emirates
--:-- UTC+3		Report		Stadium: Khalid bin Mohammed Stadium; Attendance: 200; Referee: Adham Makhadmeh (Jordan)
Note: Match played in the United Arab Emirates due to fears of spillover from the ongoing Gaza war.

21 November 2023 2026 World Cup qualification R2	Palestine	0–1	Australia	Kuwait City, Kuwait (Note: Palestine have chosen Kuwait as the venue of their World Cup qualifier against Australia, due to the ongoing Gaza war.)
			Souttar 18'	Stadium: Jaber Al-Ahmad International Stadium

19 December 2023 Friendly	Algeria U23	1–1	Palestine	Annaba, Algeria
18:00 UTC+1	Driss 13'		Qunbar 47'	Stadium: 19 May 1956 Stadium; Referee: Houssam Benyahia (Algeria)

=== 2024 ===
7 January 2024 Friendly	Palestine	0–1	Uzbekistan	Doha, Qatar
17:00 UTC+3		Report	Abdikholikov 79'	Stadium: Hamad bin Khalifa Stadium

9 January 2024 Friendly	Palestine	0–0	Saudi Arabia	Doha, Qatar
18:30 UTC+3		Report; Report (SAFF)	S. AL-Dawsari (red card) 52'	Stadium: Al Janoub Stadium; Attendance: 0

14 January 2024 2023 AFC Asian Cup GS	Iran	4–1	Palestine	Al Rayyan, Qatar
20:30 UTC+3				Stadium: Education City Stadium

18 January 2024 2023 AFC Asian Cup GS	Palestine	1–1	United Arab Emirates	Al Wakrah, Qatar
20:30 UTC+3				Stadium: Al Janoub Stadium

23 January 2024 2023 AFC Asian Cup GS	Hong Kong	0–3	Palestine	Doha, Qatar
18:00 UTC+3				Stadium: Abdullah bin Khalifa Stadium

29 January 2024 2023 AFC Asian Cup round of 16	Qatar	2–1	Palestine	Al Khor, Qatar
14:30 UTC+3				Stadium: Al Bayt Stadium

21 March 2024 2026 World Cup qualification R2	Palestine	5–0	Bangladesh	Kuwait City, Kuwait (Note: Palestine will play their home game at a neutral venue due to the ongoing Gaza war.)
21:30 UTC+3	Dabbagh 43', 53', 77'; S.Qunbar 45+1', 49'	Report		Stadium: Jaber Al-Ahmad International Stadium

26 March 2024 2026 World Cup qualification R2	Bangladesh	0–1	Palestine	Dhaka, Bangladesh
15:30 UTC+6		Report	Termanini 90+4'	Stadium: Bashundhara Kings Arena; Attendance: 5,195; Referee: Nasrullo Kabirov (Tajikistan)

6 June 2024 2026 World Cup qualification R2	Palestine	0–0	Lebanon	Doha, Qatar
19:00 UTC+3		Report (FIFA); Report (AFC)		Stadium: Jassim bin Hamad Stadium; Attendance: 2,428; Referee: Abdulrahman Al-Jassim (Qatar)

11 June 2024 2026 World Cup qualification R2	Australia	5-0	Palestine	Perth, Australia
20:10 UTC+8	Yengi 5' (pen.), 41'; Taggart 26'; Boyle 53'; Irankunda 87' (pen.)	Report		Stadium: Perth Rectangular Stadium; Attendance: 18,261; Referee: Khalid Al-Turais (Saudi Arabia)

31 August 2024 Hybrid friendly	PDRM (Malaysia)	1–2	Palestine	Kuala Lumpur, Malaysia
17:00 UTC+8	Olusegun	Report	Seyam; Cantillana (pen.)	Stadium: MP Selayang Stadium; Attendance: 0

5 September 2024 2026 World Cup qualification R3	South Korea	0–0	Palestine	Seoul, South Korea
20:00 UTC+9		Report		Stadium: Seoul World Cup Stadium; Attendance: 59,579; Referee: Alireza Faghani (Australia)

10 September 2024 2026 World Cup qualification R3	Palestine	1–3	Jordan	Kuala Lumpur, Malaysia
19:00 UTC+8	Ali 41'	Report	Al-Naimat 5', 50'; Al-Rawabdeh 72'	Stadium: Kuala Lumpur Stadium; Attendance: 3,012; Referee: Majed Al-Shamrani (Saudi Arabia)

10 October 2024 2026 World Cup qualification R3	Iraq	1–0	Palestine	Basra, Iraq
21:00 UTC+3	Hussein 31'	Report		Stadium: Basra International Stadium; Attendance: 44,773; Referee: Adel Al-Naqbi (United Arab Emirates)

15 October 2024 2026 World Cup qualification R3	Palestine	2–2	Kuwait	Doha, Qatar
19:00 UTC+3	Abou Ali 41' (pen.); Z. Qunbar 90+3'	Report (FIFA); Report (AFC)	Al Sulaiman 31' (pen.), 80'	Stadium: Jassim bin Hamad Stadium; Attendance: 1,827; Referee: Abdulrahman Al-Jassim (Qatar)

14 November 2024 2026 World Cup qualification R3	Oman	1–0	Palestine	Muscat, Oman
20:00 UTC+4	Al-Ghassani 83'	Report (FIFA); Report (AFC)		Stadium: Sultan Qaboos Sports Complex; Attendance: 21,754; Referee: Fu Ming (China)

19 November 2024 2026 World Cup qualification R3	Palestine	1–1	South Korea	Amman, Jordan
17:00 UTC+3	Qunbar 12'	Report	Son Heung-min 16'	Stadium: Amman International Stadium; Attendance: 2,405; Referee: Yusuke Araki (Japan)

=== 2025 ===
20 March 2025 2026 World Cup qualification R3	Jordan	3–1	Palestine	Amman, Jordan
21:15 UTC+3	Al-Arab 3'; Nasib 11'; Al-Taamari 45+3'	Report	Seyam 33'	Stadium: Amman International Stadium; Referee: Shaun Evans (Australia)

25 March 2025 2026 World Cup qualification R3	Palestine	2–1	Iraq	Amman, Jordan
21:15 UTC+3	Abou Ali 88'; Mahajna 90+7'	Report	Hussein 34'	Stadium: Amman International Stadium; Referee: Khalid Al-Turais (Saudi Arabia)

5 June 2025 2026 World Cup qualification R3	Kuwait	0–2	Palestine	Kuwait City, Kuwait
21:15 UTC+3		Report	Seyam 32'; Abou Ali 88' (pen.)	Stadium: Jaber Al-Ahmad International Stadium; Attendance: 5,250; Referee: Sadullo Gulmurodi (Tajikistan)

10 June 2025 2026 World Cup qualification R3	Palestine	1–1	Oman	Amman, Jordan
21:15 UTC+3	Kharoub 49'	Report	Al-Sabhi 90+7' (pen.)	Stadium: King Abdullah II Stadium; Referee: Mooud Bonyadifard (Iran)

8 September 2025 Friendly	Malaysia	0–3; Awarded (Note: Due to the Malaysian football naturalisation scandal, the FIFA Disciplinary Committee awarded the match as a 3–0 win to Palestine on 17 December 2025 as Malaysia fielded the ineligible players Rodrigo Holgado, João Figueiredo and Jon Irazabal. The Football Association of Malaysia (FAM) were also fined CHF 10,000.)	Palestine	Johor, Malaysia
21:00 UTC+8		Report		Stadium: Sultan Ibrahim Stadium; Attendance: 7,084; Referee: Yudi Nurcahya (Indonesia)

9 October 2025 Hybrid friendly	Algeria A'	3–0	Palestine	Annaba, Algeria
20:30 UTC+1	Berkane 13', 27'; Boulbina 36' (pen.)	Report		Stadium: 19 May 1956 Stadium; Referee: Alaa Bouab (Algeria)

13 October 2025 Hybrid friendly	Algeria A'	0–1	Palestine	Annaba, Algeria
18:00 UTC+1		Report	Qunbar 38'	Stadium: 19 May 1956 Stadium; Referee: Alaa Bouab (Algeria)

15 November 2025 Unofficial friendly	Basque Country	3–0	Palestine	Bilbao, Spain
20:30 UTC+1	Elgezabal 5'; Guruzeta 43' (pen.); Izeta 77'	Report		Stadium: San Mamés Stadium; Attendance: 51,396; Referee: Jon Ander González (Basque Country)

18 November 2025 Unofficial friendly	Catalonia	2–1	Palestine	Barcelona, Spain
18:30 UTC+1	Sánchez 4'; Roca 27'	Report	Zeidan 30'	Stadium: Lluís Companys Olympic Stadium; Attendance: 30,018; Referee: Víctor Garcia Verdura (Spain)

25 November 2025 2025 Arab Cup qualifiers	Palestine	0–0 (4–3 p)	Libya	Al Rayyan, Qatar
19:00 UTC+3		Report		Stadium: Al Gharafa Stadium; Referee: Mario Escobar (Guatemala)
	Penalties
	Dabbagh (penalty scored); Hamdan (penalty scored); Saleh (penalty scored); Termanini (penalty missed); Mahajna (penalty scored)		(penalty missed) Youssef; (penalty scored) Ali; (penalty scored) Taktak; (penalty scored) Tajouri-Shradi; (penalty missed) Alhibeeshi

1 December 2025 2025 Arab Cup	Qatar	0–1	Palestine	Al Khor, Qatar
18:45 UTC+3		Report	Al-Brake 90+5' (o.g.)	Stadium: Al Bayt Stadium; Attendance: 61,475; Referee: Glenn Nyberg (Sweden)

4 December 2025 2025 Arab Cup	Palestine	2–2	Tunisia	Lusail, Qatar
17:30 UTC+3	Hamdan 61'; Qunbar 85'	Report	Layouni 16'; Chaouat 51'	Stadium: Lusail Iconic Stadium; Attendance: 44,548; Referee: Ismail Elfath (United States)

7 December 2025 2025 Arab Cup	Syria	0–0	Palestine	Al Rayyan, Qatar
20:00 UTC+3		Report		Stadium: Education City Stadium; Attendance: 39,571; Referee: Ahmed Al-Kaf (Oman)

11 December 2025 2025 Arab Cup	Palestine	1–2 (a.e.t.)	Saudi Arabia	Lusail, Qatar
20:30 UTC+3	Dabbagh 64'	Report	Al-Buraikan 58' (pen.); Kanno 115'	Stadium: Lusail Iconic Stadium; Attendance: 77,197; Referee: Amin Omar (Egypt)

=== 2026 ===
6 June Friendly	Palestine	0–0	Kyrgyzstan	Bishkek, Kyrgyzstan
20:30 UTC+6		Report		Stadium: Dolen Omurzakov Stadium; Referee: Axrol Riskullayev (Uzbekistan)

9 June Friendly	Kyrgyzstan	0–0	Palestine	Bishkek, Kyrgyzstan
20:30 UTC+6				Stadium: Dolen Omurzakov Stadium; Referee: Rustam Lutfullin (Uzbekistan)

24 September Friendly tournament	Palestine	2–2	New Zealand	Chongqing, China
17:30 UTC+8	Al Hamlawi 27'; Dabbagh 39'	Report	Waine 5'; Randall 35'	Stadium: Tongliang Long Stadium; Attendance: 0

28 September Friendly tournament	Tajikistan	2–4	Palestine	Chongqing, China
20:00 UTC+8	Boboev 4'; Babadjanov 24'; Dzhuraboyev (yellow card) (yellow-red card) 53'	Report	Al Hamlawi 21', 45'; Hassan 46'; Dabbagh 74'	Stadium: Tongliang Long Stadium; Attendance: 0

2 October Friendly tournament	China	0–5	Palestine	Chongqing, China
20:35 UTC+8		Report	Al Hamlawi 16', 22'; Dabbagh 45+5', 54'; Al-Qaq 90+3'	Stadium: Longxing Football Stadium; Referee: Asker Nazhafaliev (Uzbekistan)

9–17 November Friendly tournament	Iran	v	Palestine	Basra, Iraq

9–17 November Friendly tournament	Palestine	v	TBD	Basra, Iraq

=== 2027 ===
7 January 2027 Asian Cup GS	Saudi Arabia	v	Palestine	Riyadh, Saudi Arabia
--:--				Stadium: King Fahd Sports City Stadium

12 January 2027 Asian Cup GS	Palestine	v	Kuwait	Al Khobar, Saudi Arabia
--:--				Stadium: Aramco Stadium

17 January 2027 Asian Cup GS	Oman	v	Palestine	Riyadh, Saudi Arabia
--:--				Stadium: King Saud University Stadium
