= Palestine national football team records and statistics =

Statistics of Palestine football team

This article lists various individual and team records in relation to the Palestine national football team (The Fedayeen). The page currently shows the records as of 15 January 2020.

== Individual records ==
=== Player records ===
==== Most-capped players ====
Rank	Player	Caps	Goals	Career
1	Abdelatif Bahdari	79	9	2007–present
2	Ramzi Saleh	68	0	2000–2015
3	Khader Yousef	64	2	2008–2016
4	Saeb Jendeya	58	0	1999–2008
5	Abdallah Jaber	56	2	2014–present
6	Tamer Seyam	50	11	2014–Present
6	Musab Al-Battat	50	1	2013–Present
8	Mohammed Darweesh	47	0	2015–present
8	Ashraf Nu'man	47	12	2008–2016
8	Husam Abu Saleh	47	3	2010–15

==== Top goalscorers ====
Rank	Player	Goals (U/O)	Caps	Ratio	Career
1	Fahed Attal	14 (2)	39	0.35	2004–2012
1	Ashraf Nu'man	12 (3)	47	0.25	2009–2016
3	Sameh Maraaba	11 (2)	41	0.29	2015–present
4	Tamer Seyam	12	52	0.22	2014–present
5	Jonathan Cantillana	10	25	0.37	2015–Present
5	Ziyad Al-Kord	10 (4)	33	0.36	1999–2006
5	Oday Dabbagh	10 (1)	27	0.38	2018–present
8	Abdelatif Bahdari	9	79	0.11	2007–present
9	Ahmad Maher Wridat	8	27	0.28	2011–2018
10	Abdelhamid Abuhabib	7 (2)	34	0.22	2012–2021
10	Yashir Islame	7	19	0.22	2016–present

== Team records ==
=== Wins ===
Largest win

- 11–0 vs Guam on 1 April 2006

Largest home win

- 10–0 vs Bhutan on 10 October 2017

Largest win at the Asian Cup

- N/A

=== Draws ===
Highest scoring draw

- 3–3 vs Tajikistan on 5 October 2016

Highest scoring draw at the Asian Cup

- 0–0 vs Syria on 6 January 2019
- 0–0 vs Jordan on 15 January 2019

=== Defeats ===
Largest defeat

- 8–1 vs Egypt on 26 July 1953
- 7–0 vs Iran on 5 October 2011

Largest defeat at home

- 0–3 vs Iraq on 4 August 2018

Largest defeat at the Asian Cup

- 4–0 vs Japan on 12 January 2015
- 5–1 vs Jordan on 16 January 2015

=== Streaks ===
Unbeaten record
12 games, 2016–2018
Winless record
22 games, 2006–2011

=== World rankings ===
==== FIFA ====
Source: FIFA.com

Highest FIFA ranking
73rd (February 2018)
Lowest FIFA ranking
191st (April – August 1999)

==== Elo ====
Source: Eloratings.net

Highest Elo ranking
90th (September 2019)
Lowest Elo ranking
169th (September 2010)

== Goal records ==
=== General ===
First goal
Herbert Meitner vs Lebanon on 27 April 1940

Most goals
Fahed Attal (2005–2012), 16 goals

#	Player	Period	Goals	Caps	Average
1	Fahed Attal	2005–2012	16	36	0.44
2	Ashraf Nu'man	2009–2016	14	56	0.25
3	Ziyad Al-Kord	1999–2006	11	25	0.44
4	Jonathan Cantillana	2015–	10	26	0.38
5	Sameh Maraaba	2014–	9	32	0.28
5	Abdelatif Bahdari	2007–	9	74	0.12
7	Ahmad Maher Wridat	2011–	8	29	0.28
7	Abdelhamid Abuhabib	2012–	8	33	0.24
9	Murad Alyan	2011	7	9	0.78
9	Ismail Al-Amour	2005–2015	7	46	0.15

As of 19 November 2019. Highlighted names denote a player still playing or available for selection.

=== Hat-tricks ===
As of 14 November 2017

Player	Competition	Against	Home/Away	Result	Goals	Date
Fahed Attal	2006 AFC Challenge Cup	Guam	Away	11–0	6	1 April 2006
Ashraf Nu'man	Friendly	India	Away	4–2	3	6 February 2013
Khaled Salem	2014 AFC Challenge Cup qualification	Northern Mariana Islands	Away	9–0	3	4 March 2013
Ahmad Maher Wridat	2014 Philippine Peace Cup	Chinese Taipei	Away	7–3	4	6 September 2014
Ahmad Abu Nahyeh	2018 FIFA World Cup qualification	Malaysia	Home	6–0	3	12 November 2015
Abdelatif Bahdari	2019 AFC Asian Cup qualification	Bhutan	Home	10–0	3	10 October 2017
Sameh Maraaba	2019 AFC Asian Cup qualification	Maldives	Home	8–1	4	14 November 2017

=== In major tournaments ===
==== AFC Asian Cup ====
Most goals in a single Asian Cup tournament
Jaka Ihbeisheh (in 2015), 1 goal
Most goals in total at Asian Cup tournaments
Jaka Ihbeisheh (in 2015), 1 goal
Most goals in a single Asian Cup finals match
Jaka Ihbeisheh, 1 goal vs Jordan on 16 January 2015
First goal in an Asian Cup finals match
Jaka Ihbeisheh, vs Jordan on 16 January 2015

== Competition records ==
Overview
Event	1st place	2nd place	3rd place	4th place
World Cup	0	0	0	0
Asian Cup	0	0	0	0
AFC Challenge Cup	1	0	0	1
WAFF Championship	0	0	0	0
Arab Cup	0	0	0	0
Pan Arab Games	0	0	1	2
Asian Games	0	0	0	0

=== FIFA World Cup ===
Palestine's FIFA World Cup record										Qualification record						
Host nation(s) and year	Round	Pos	Pld	W	D	L	GF	GA	Squad	Outcome	Pld	W	D	L	GF	GA
(Uruguay) 1930	Not a FIFA member									Not a FIFA member						
(Italy) 1934	Not a FIFA member									Not a FIFA member						
(France) 1938	Not a FIFA member									Not a FIFA member						
(Brazil) 1950	Not a FIFA member									Not a FIFA member						
(Switzerland) 1954	Not a FIFA member									Not a FIFA member						
(Sweden) 1958	Not a FIFA member									Not a FIFA member						
(Chile) 1962	Not a FIFA member									Not a FIFA member						
(England) 1966	Not a FIFA member									Not a FIFA member						
(Mexico) 1970	Not a FIFA member									Not a FIFA member						
(West Germany) 1974	Not a FIFA member									Not a FIFA member						
(Argentina) 1978	Not a FIFA member									Not a FIFA member						
(Spain) 1982	Not a FIFA member									Not a FIFA member						
(Mexico) 1986	Not a FIFA member									Not a FIFA member						
(Italy) 1990	Not a FIFA member									Not a FIFA member						
(United States) 1994	Not a FIFA member									Not a FIFA member						
(France) 1998	Not a FIFA member									Not a FIFA member						
(South Korea) (Japan) 2002	Did not qualify									2nd of 4	6	2	1	3	8	9
(Germany) 2006	Did not qualify									3rd of 4	6	2	1	3	11	11
(South Africa) 2010	Did not qualify									First round loss	2	0	0	2	0	7
(Brazil) 2014	Did not qualify									First round win, second round loss	4	1	2	1	5	4
(Russia) 2018	Did not qualify									3rd of 5	8	4	2	2	24	5
(Qatar) 2022	Did not qualify									3rd of 5	8	3	1	4	10	10
(Canada) (Mexico) (United States) 2026	To be determined									To be determined						
Total	Best: N/A	0/22	0	0	0	0	0	0	—	Total	34	12	7	15	58	46
Champions Runners-up Third place Fourth place / Home venue

=== AFC Asian Cup ===
Palestine's AFC Asian Cup record										Qualification record						
Host nation(s) and year	Round	Pos	Pld	W	D	L	GF	GA	Squad	Outcome	Pld	W	D	L	GF	GA
(Hong Kong) 1956	Did not participate									Did not participate						
(South Korea) 1960	Did not participate									Did not participate						
(Israel) 1964	Did not participate									Did not participate						
(Iran) 1968	Did not participate									Did not participate						
(Thailand) 1972	Did not participate									Did not participate						
(Iran) 1976	Did not participate									Did not participate						
(Kuwait) 1980	Did not participate									Did not participate						
(Singapore) 1984	Did not participate									Did not participate						
(Qatar) 1988	Did not participate									Did not participate						
(Japan) 1992	Did not participate									Did not participate						
(United Arab Emirates) 1996	Did not participate									Did not participate						
(Lebanon) 2000	Did not qualify									4th of 5	4	1	0	3	3	8
(China) 2004	Did not qualify									4th of 4	6	0	2	4	3	11
(Indonesia) (Malaysia) (Thailand) (Vietnam) 2007	Did not qualify									4th of 4	5	1	1	3	3	9
(Qatar) 2011	Did not qualify									The 2010 AFC Challenge Cup served as the qualifying tournament						
(Australia) 2015	Group stage	16th of 16	3	0	0	3	1	11	Squad	Qualified as 2014 AFC Challenge Cup winners						
(United Arab Emirates) 2019	Group stage	17th of 24	3	0	2	1	0	3	Squad	3rd of 5, 2nd of 4	14	9	2	3	49	8
(China) 2023	To be determined									Ongoing						
Total	Best: group stage	2/17	6	0	2	4	1	14	—	Total	29	11	5	13	58	36
Champions Runners-up Third place/semi-finalists / Home venue

AFC Asian Cup history
Year	Round	Date	Opponent	Result	Stadium
(Australia) 2015	Group stage	12 January	Japan	L 0–4	Newcastle Stadium, Newcastle
(Australia) 2015	Group stage	16 January	Jordan	L 1–5	Melbourne Rectangular Stadium, Melbourne
(Australia) 2015	Group stage	20 January	Iraq	L 0–2	Canberra Stadium, Canberra
(United Arab Emirates) 2019	Group stage	6 January	Syria	D 0–0	Sharjah Stadium, Sharjah
(United Arab Emirates) 2019	Group stage	11 January	Australia	L 0–3	Rashid Stadium, Dubai
(United Arab Emirates) 2019	Group stage	15 January	Jordan	D 0–0	Mohammed bin Zayed Stadium, Abu Dhabi

=== AFC Challenge Cup ===
Palestine's AFC Challenge Cup record										Qualification record						
Host nation(s) and year	Round	Pos	Pld	W	D	L	GF	GA	Squad	Outcome	Pld	W	D	L	GF	GA
(Bangladesh) 2006	Quarter-finals	5th of 16	4	2	1	1	16	2	Squad	Qualified as invitees						
(India) 2008	Withdrew									Withdrew						
(Sri Lanka) 2010	Did not qualify									3rd of 3	2	0	2	0	1	1
(Nepal) 2012	Fourth place	4th of 8	5	2	1	2	7	6	Squad	1st of 4	3	2	1	0	5	1
(Maldives) 2014	Champions	1st of 8	5	4	1	0	6	0	Squad	1st of 4	3	2	1	0	10	0
Total	Best: champions	3/5	14	8	3	3	29	8	—	Total	8	4	4	0	16	2
Champions Runners-up Third place Fourth place / Home venue

=== WAFF Championship ===
Palestine's WAFF Championship record
Host nation(s) and year	Round	Pos	Pld	W	D	L	GF	GA	Squad
(Jordan) 2000	Group stage	7th of 8	3	0	1	2	3	5	Squad
(Syria) 2002	Group stage	5th of 6	2	0	0	2	1	4	Squad
(Iran) 2004	Group stage	5th of 6	2	0	1	1	2	3	Squad
(Jordan) 2007	Group stage	5th of 6	2	0	0	2	0	3	Squad
(Iran) 2008	Group stage	6th of 6	2	0	0	2	0	4	Squad
(Jordan) 2010	Group stage	9th of 9	2	0	0	2	1	6	Squad
(Kuwait) 2012	Group stage	8th of 12	3	1	0	2	3	4	Squad
(Qatar) 2014	Group stage	7th of 9	2	0	1	1	0	1	Squad
(Iraq) 2019	Group stage	3rd of 9	4	2	1	1	6	5	Squad
(United Arab Emirates) 2021	Group stage	TBD	0	0	0	0	0	0	Squad
Total	Best: group stage	10/10	22	3	4	15	16	35	—
Champions Runners-up Third place/semi-finalists / Home venue

=== Arab Cup ===
Palestine's Arab Cup record
Host nation(s) and year	Round	Pos	Pld	W	D	L	GF	GA
(Lebanon) 1963	Did not participate							
(Kuwait) 1964	Did not participate							
(Iraq) 1966	Group stage	5th of 9	3	1	1	1	8	3
(Saudi Arabia) 1985	Did not participate							
(Jordan) 1988	Did not qualify							
(Syria) 1992	Group stage	5th of 6	2	0	1	1	1	2
(Qatar) 1998	Did not qualify							
(Kuwait) 2002	Group stage	9th of 10	4	0	3	1	7	9
(Saudi Arabia) 2012	Group stage	9th of 10	2	0	1	1	2	4
(Qatar) 2021	To be determined							
Total	Best: group stage	4/9	11	1	6	4	18	18
Champions Runners-up Third place Fourth place / Home venue

=== Pan Arab Games ===
Palestine's Pan Arab Games record
Host nation, city and year	Round	Pos	Pld	W	D	L	GF	GA	Squad
(Egypt) Alexandria 1953	Group stage	6th of 6	2	0	0	2	3	13	Squad
(Lebanon) Beirut 1957	Did not participate								
(Morocco) Casablanca 1961	Did not participate								
(United Arab Republic) Cairo 1965	Fourth place	4th of 10	6	2	1	3	7	9	Squad
(Syria) Damascus 1976	Final group	6th of 7	6	2	1	3	4	9	Squad
(Morocco) Rabat 1985	Did not participate								
(Syria) Aleppo 1992	Group stage	5th of 6	2	0	1	1	1	2	Squad
(Lebanon) Beirut 1997	Did not participate								
(Jordan) Amman 1999	Third place	3rd of 11	6	2	2	2	6	9	Squad
(Egypt) Cairo 2007	Did not participate								
(Qatar) Doha 2011	Fourth place	4th of 12	5	1	1	3	5	11	Squad
Total	Best: third place	6/11	27	7	6	14	26	55	—
Champions Runners-up Third place Fourth place / Home venue

=== Asian Games ===
Palestine's Asian Games record
Host nation, city and year	Round	Pos	Pld	W	D	L	GF	GA	Squad
(India) New Delhi 1951	Did not enter								
(Philippines) Manila 1954	Did not enter								
(Japan) Tokyo 1958	Did not enter								
(Indonesia) Jakarta 1962	Did not enter								
(Thailand) Bangkok 1966	Did not enter								
(Thailand) Bangkok 1970	Did not enter								
(Iran) Tehran 1974	Did not enter								
(Thailand) Bangkok 1978	Did not enter								
(India) New Delhi 1982	Did not enter								
(South Korea) Seoul 1986	Did not enter								
(China) Beijing 1990	Did not enter								
(Japan) Hiroshima 1994	Withdrew								
(Thailand) Bangkok 1998	Did not enter								
2002–present	See Palestine national under-23 football team								
Total	Best: N/A	0/13	0	0	0	0	0	0	—
Gold Silver Bronze / Home venue

=== Other tournaments ===
Tournament	Round	Ref
(Bangladesh) 2018 Bangabandhu Cup	Winners	
(Bangladesh) 2020 Bangabandhu Cup	Winners	

== Head-to-head record ==
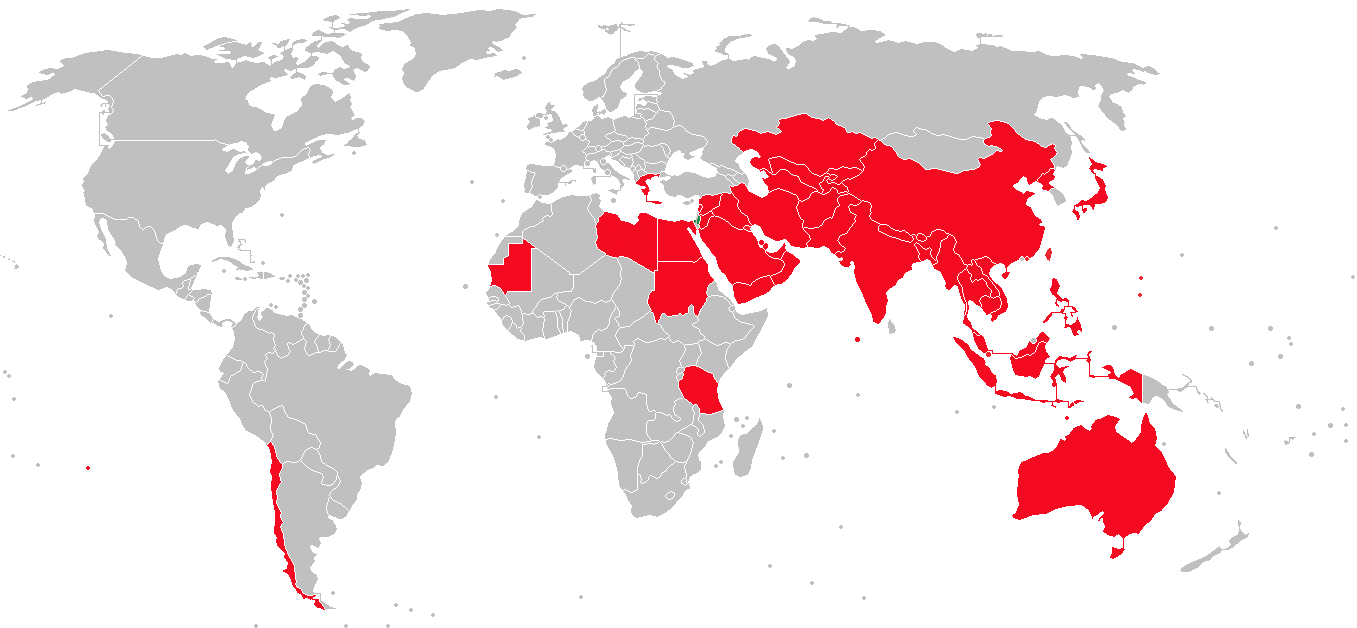
Map of football matches between Palestine (in green) and their opponents (in red) (26 June 2019)

Key

Positive balance (more wins than losses)
Neutral balance (as many wins as losses)
Negative balance (more losses than wins)

The following table shows Palestine's all-time official international record per opponent:

As of 14 November 2026 after match against Iran

Opponent	From	To	Pld	W	D	L	GF	GA	GD	Win %
Afghanistan	2011	2018	4	2	2	0	5	1	+4	50.00
Algeria	1969	2005	3	0	0	3	0	7	−7	0.00
Algeria B	2025	2025	2	1	0	1	1	3	−2	50.00
Australia	2019	2024	3	0	0	3	0	9	−9	0.00
Azerbaijan	2012	2012	1	1	0	0	2	0	+2	100.00
Bahrain	2004	2023	8	4	1	3	8	7	+1	50.00
Bangladesh	2006	2024	8	7	1	0	16	1	+15	87.50
Basque Country	2025	2025	1	0	0	1	0	3	−3	0.00
Bhutan	2017	2017	2	2	0	0	12	0	+12	100.00
Burundi	2020	2020	1	1	0	0	3	1	+2	100.00
Cambodia	1966	2006	2	1	0	1	4	4	+0	50.00
Catalonia	2025	2025	1	0	0	1	1	2	−1	0.00
Chile	2002	2002	1	0	0	1	1	3	−2	0.00
China	2006	2026	8	1	2	5	7	17	−10	12.50
Chinese Taipei	2004	2014	3	3	0	0	16	3	+13	100.00
Comoros	2021	2021	1	1	0	0	5	1	+4	100.00
Egypt	1953	1973	3	0	0	3	4	23	−19	0.00
Guam	2006	2006	1	1	0	0	11	0	+11	100.00
Hong Kong	2001	2024	3	2	1	0	5	1	+4	66.67
India	2013	2014	2	2	0	0	7	4	+3	100.00
Indonesia	2011	2023	3	1	1	1	3	5	−2	33.33
Iraq	1965	2025	19	1	4	14	9	40	−31	5.26
Iran	2000	2026	7	0	2	5	3	20	−17	0.00
Jordan	1976	2025	16	1	6	9	14	40	−26	6.25
Japan	2015	2015	1	0	0	1	0	4	−4	0.00
Kazakhstan	2000	2000	2	0	0	2	2	5	−3	0.00
South Korea	2024	2024	2	0	2	0	1	1	+0	0.00
Kuwait	2002	2025	10	1	2	7	11	22	−11	10.00
Kyrgyzstan	2006	2026	8	1	4	3	6	8	−2	12.50
Lebanon	1940	2024	9	3	5	1	9	5	+4	33.33
Libya	1953	2025	8	0	6	2	7	12	−5	0.00
Malaysia	2001	2025	6	4	0	2	18	5	+13	66.67
Maldives	2012	2017	4	3	1	0	13	1	+12	75.00
Myanmar	2011	2014	3	2	0	1	6	5	+1	66.67
Morocco	1976	2021	3	0	0	3	1	10	−9	0.00
Mauritania	1976	2010	2	1	1	0	1	0	+1	50.00
Nepal	2009	2018	4	2	2	0	3	0	+3	50.00
New Zealand	2026	2026	1	0	1	0	2	2	+0	0.00
North Korea	1966	2012	2	0	0	2	1	7	−6	0.00
Northern Mariana Islands	2013	2013	1	1	0	0	9	0	+9	100.00
Oman	2012	2025	6	1	1	4	5	8	−3	16.67
Pakistan	2000	2018	5	5	0	0	11	1	+10	100.00
Philippines	2011	2022	4	2	1	1	8	4	+4	50.00
Qatar	1972	2024	12	1	2	9	12	19	−7	8.33
Saudi Arabia	1976	2025	12	0	4	8	7	24	−17	0.00
Seychelles	2020	2020	1	1	0	0	1	0	+1	100.00
Singapore	2003	2021	6	2	1	3	6	8	−2	33.33
Sri Lanka	2020	2020	1	1	0	0	2	0	+2	100.00
Sudan	1965	2010	8	0	4	4	8	14	−6	0.00
Syria	1966	2025	16	2	6	8	13	25	−12	12.50
Tajikistan	2016	2026	5	2	3	0	10	6	+4	40.00
Tanzania	2011	2011	1	0	0	1	0	1	−1	0.00
Thailand	2011	2011	2	0	1	1	2	3	−1	0.00
Timor-Leste	2015	2016	2	2	0	0	10	0	+10	100.00
Tunisia	1969	2025	3	0	2	1	5	9	−4	0.00
Turkmenistan	2012	2012	1	0	1	0	0	0	+0	0.00
United Arab Emirates	1999	2024	6	1	3	2	3	7	−4	16.67
Uzbekistan	2004	2023	6	1	0	5	2	10	−8	16.67
Vietnam (Note: All the matches against Vietnam include North Vietnam's and South Vietnam's record before 1975)	1966	2023	3	1	0	2	3	7	−4	33.33
Yemen	2010	2022	7	5	0	2	13	5	+8	71.43
Total	1940	2026	259	74	67	118	326	401	−75	28.57

Last updated: Iran vs. Palestine, 14 November 2026. Statistics include official FIFA-recognised matches only.
