= Palestine national football team results =

This article summarizes the outcomes of all official matches played by the Palestine national football team by opponent and by period, since they first played in official competitions in 1953.

== Results in chronological order ==
=== 2010–2019 ===
105 matches played:

2010–2019
Win Draw Defeat
M	Date	Opponent	Result	Event
	2010-06-04	Sudan	1–1	Friendly
	2010-08-11	Mauritania	0–0	Friendly
	2010-09-27	Yemen	1–3	(Jordan) 2010 WAFF GS
	2010-09-29	Iraq	0–3	(Jordan) 2010 WAFF GS
	2011-02-09	Tanzania	1–0	Friendly
	2011-03-21	Bangladesh	2–0	(Myanmar) 2012 A.C. Q
	2011-03-23	Philippines	0–0	(Myanmar) 2012 A.C. Q
	2013-03-25	Myanmar	1–3	(Myanmar) 2012 A.C. Q
	2011-06-29	Afghanistan	0–2	(Brazil) 2014 W.C. Q R1
	2011-07-03	Afghanistan	1–1	(Brazil) 2014 W.C. Q R1
	2011-07-23	Thailand	1–0	(Brazil) 2014 W.C. Q R2
	2011-07-28	Thailand	2–2	(Brazil) 2014 W.C. Q R2
	2011-08-22	Indonesia	4–1	Friendly
	2011-10-05	Iran	7–0	Friendly
	2011-10-05	Bahrain	0–1	Friendly
	2011-12-14	Libya	1–1	(Qatar) 2011 P.A. GS
	2011-12-17	Sudan	0–2	(Qatar) 2011 P.A. GS
	2011-12-20	Bahrain	3–1	(Qatar) 2011 P.A. SF
	2011-12-22	Kuwait	0–3	(Qatar) 2011 P.A. TP
	2012-02-24	United Arab Emirates	3–0	Friendly
	2012-03-08	Nepal	0–2	(Nepal) 2012 A.C. GS
	2012-03-10	Turkmenistan	0–0	(Nepal) 2012 A.C. GS
	2012-03-12	Maldives	0–2	(Nepal) 2012 A.C. GS
	2012-03-16	North Korea	2–0	(Nepal) 2012 A.C. SF
	2012-03-19	Philippines	4–3	(Nepal) 2012 A.C. TP
	2012-05-28	Qatar	0–0	Friendly
	2012-06-18	Yemen	1–2	Friendly
	2012-06-25	Kuwait	2–0	(Saudi Arabia) 2012 A.N. GS
	2012-06-28	Saudi Arabia	2–2	(Saudi Arabia) 2012 A.N. GS
	2012-11-17	Syria	1–1	Friendly
	2012-11-20	Syria	2–1	Friendly
	2012-11-29	Bahrain	2–0	Friendly
	2012-12-08	Kuwait	2–1	(Kuwait) 2012 WAFF GS
	2012-12-11	Lebanon	0–1	(Kuwait) 2012 WAFF GS
	2012-12-14	Oman	2–1	(Kuwait) 2012 WAFF GS
	2013-02-06	India	2–4	Friendly
	2013-03-02	Bangladesh	1–0	(Nepal) 2014 A.C. Q
	2013-03-04	Northern Mariana Islands	0–9	(Nepal) 2014 A.C. Q
	2013-03-06	Nepal	0–0	(Nepal) 2014 A.C. Q
	2013-03-21	Kuwait	2–1	Friendly
	2013-04-17	Qatar	2–0	Friendly
	2013-12-25	Qatar	1–0	(Qatar) 2014 WAFF GS
	2014-05-19	Kyrgyzstan	1–0	(Maldives) 2014 A.C. GS
	2014-05-21	Myanmar	0–2	(Maldives) 2014 A.C. GS
	2014-05-23	Maldives	0–0	(Maldives) 2014 A.C. GS
	2014-09-03	Afghanistan	2–0	(Maldives) 2014 A.C. SF
	2014-05-30	Philippines	1–0	(Maldives) 2014 A.C. F
	2014-09-03	Myanmar	4–1	(Philippines) 2014 P.P. SF
	2014-09-06	Chinese Taipei	7–3	(Philippines) 2014 P.P. TP
	2014-10-06	India	2–3	Friendly
	2014-10-12	Pakistan	0–2	Friendly
	2014-11-06	Saudi Arabia	2–0	Friendly
	2014-11-12	Vietnam	1–3	Friendly
	2014-12-13	Uzbekistan	1–0	Friendly
	2014-12-21	China	0–0	Friendly
	2015-01-12	Japan	4–0	(Australia) 2015 ASIA GS
	2015-01-16	Jordan	1–5	(Australia) 2015 ASIA GS
	2015-01-20	Iraq	2–0	(Australia) 2015 ASIA GS
	2015-06-11	Saudi Arabia	3–2	(Russia) 2018 W.C. Q R2
	2015-06-16	Malaysia	0–6	(Russia) 2018 W.C. Q R2
	2015-08-31	Lebanon	0–0	Friendly
	2015-09-08	United Arab Emirates	0–0	(Russia) 2018 W.C. Q R2
	2015-10-08	Timor-Leste	0–3	(Russia) 2018 W.C. Q R2
	2015-11-09	Saudi Arabia	0–0	(Russia) 2018 W.C. Q R2
	2015-11-12	Malaysia	6–0	(Russia) 2018 W.C. Q R2
	2016-03-24	United Arab Emirates	2–0	(Russia) 2018 W.C. Q R2
	2016-03-29	Timor-Leste	7–0	(Russia) 2018 W.C. Q R2
	2016-09-05	Tajikistan	1–1	Friendly
	2016-10-06	Tajikistan	3–3	Friendly
	2016-11-10	Lebanon	1–1	Friendly
	2017-03-22	Yemen	0–1	Friendly
	2017-03-28	Maldives	0–3	(United Arab Emirates) 2019 ASIA Q R3
	2017-06-06	Bahrain	0–2	Friendly
	2017-06-13	Oman	2–1	(United Arab Emirates) 2019 ASIA Q R3
	2017-09-05	Bhutan	0–2	(United Arab Emirates) 2019 ASIA Q R3
	2017-10-10	Bhutan	10–0	(United Arab Emirates) 2019 ASIA Q R3
	2017-11-14	Maldives	8–1	(United Arab Emirates) 2019 ASIA Q R3
	2018-03-22	Bahrain	0–0	Friendly
	2018-03-27	Oman	1–0	(United Arab Emirates) 2019 ASIA Q R3
	2018-05-08	Iraq	0–0	Friendly
	2018-05-11	Kuwait	2–0	Friendly
	2018-08-04	Iraq	0–3	Friendly
	2018-09-06	Kyrgyzstan	1–1	Friendly
	2018-09-11	Qatar	3–0	Friendly
	2018-10-04	Tajikistan	0–2	(Bangladesh) 2018 B.C. GS
	2018-10-06	Nepal	1–0	(Bangladesh) 2018 B.C. GS
	2018-10-10	Bangladesh	2–0	(Bangladesh) 2018 B.C. SF
	2018-10-12	Tajikistan	0–0	(Bangladesh) 2018 B.C. F
	2018-11-16	Pakistan	2–1	Friendly
	2018-11-20	China	1–1	Friendly
	2018-12-24	Iran	1–1	Friendly
	2018-12-28	Iraq	1–0	Friendly
	2018-12-31	Kyrgyzstan	1–2	Friendly
	2019-01-09	Syria	0–0	(United Arab Emirates) 2019 ASIA GS
	2019-01-12	Australia	0–3	(United Arab Emirates) 2019 ASIA GS
	2019-01-17	Jordan	0–0	(United Arab Emirates) 2019 ASIA GS
	2019-06-11	Kyrgyzstan	2–2	Friendly
	2019-07-30	Yemen	1–0	(Iraq) 2019 WAFF GS
	2019-08-02	Iraq	2–1	(Iraq) 2019 WAFF GS
	2019-08-05	Lebanon	0–0	(Iraq) 2019 WAFF GS
	2019-08-11	Syria	7–0	(Iraq) 2019 WAFF GS
	2019-09-05	Uzbekistan	2–0	(Qatar) 2022 W.C. Q R2
	2019-09-10	Singapore	2–1	(Qatar) 2022 W.C. Q R2
	2019-10-15	Saudi Arabia	0–0	(Qatar) 2022 W.C. Q R2
	2019-11-14	Yemen	1–0	(Qatar) 2022 W.C. Q R2
	2019-11-19	Uzbekistan	2–0	(Qatar) 2022 W.C. Q R2

=== 2020–present ===
4 matches played:

2020–2029
Win Draw Defeat
M	Date	Opponent	Result	Event
	2020-01-15	Bangladesh	0–2	(Bangladesh) 2020 B.C. GS
	2020-01-17	Sri Lanka	2–0	(Bangladesh) 2020 B.C. GS
	2020-01-22	Seychelles	1–0	(Bangladesh) 2020 B.C. SF
	2020-01-25	Burundi	3–1	(Bangladesh) 2020 B.C. F
	2021-03-30	Singapore		(Qatar) 2022 W.C. Q R2
	2021-06-03	Saudi Arabia		(Qatar) 2022 W.C. Q R2
	2021-06-15	Yemen		(Qatar) 2022 W.C. Q R2

== See also ==
- Palestine national football team records and statistics
