= Biplu Ahmed =

Bangladeshi footballer

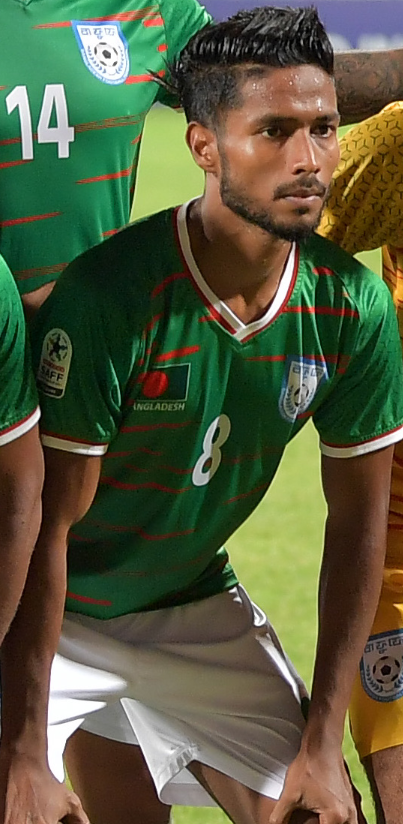
- Biplu at the 2021 SAFF Championship

Personal information
- Full name: Biplu Ahmed
- Date of birth: 5 May 1999 (age 27)
- Place of birth: Sylhet, Bangladesh
- Positions: Attacking midfielder; right winger

Team information
- Current team: Arambagh KS
- Number: 71

Senior career*
Years	Team	Apps	(Gls)
2012–13	Khilgaon FA	?	(?)
2013–14	East End Club	?	(?)
2014–15	Jatrabari KC	?	(?)
2015–18	Mohammedan SC	18	(2)
2018–19	Sheikh Russel KC	24	(4)
2020–24	Bashundhara Kings	41	(2)
2024–2025	Fortis	1	(0)
2025–	Arambagh KS	0	(0)

International career^{‡}
2018–19	Bangladesh U23	9	(1)
2018–2022	Bangladesh	36	(3)
Medal record
Representing Bangladesh
SAFF U-18 Championship
Runner-up	2017 Bhutan	Team
South Asian Games
Bronze medal – third place	2019 Kathmandu	Team
- * Club domestic league appearances and goals as of 30 November 2024 ‡ National team caps and goals as of 27 September 2022

Biplu Ahmed (Bengali: বিপলু আহমেদ; born 5 May 1999), also spelled as Biplo Ahmed, is a Bangladeshi professional footballer who plays as a midfielder for Bangladesh Football League club Arambagh KS.

== International career ==
On 27 March 2018, Biplu made his senior career debut against Laos during an international friendly.

1 October 2018, Biplu scored his first international goal against Laos in the 2018 Bangabandhu Cup.

On 14 November 2019, Biplu scored during a 1–3 defeat to Oman in the 2022 FIFA World Cup qualification – AFC second round match.

== Career statistics ==
=== Club ===
As of match played 24 May 2022

Appearances and goals by club, season and competition
Club	Season	League			Domestic Cup (Note: Appearance(s) in Bangladesh Federation Cup)		Continental		Total	
Club	Season	Division	Apps	Goals	Apps	Goals	Apps	Goals	Apps	Goals
Mohammedan SC	2017–18	BPL	18	2	0	0	—		18	2
Sheikh Russel KC	2018–19	BPL	24	4	0	0	0	0	24	4
Bashundhara Kings	2019–2020	BPL	5	0	0	0	1 (Note: Appearances in AFC Cup)	0	6	0
Bashundhara Kings	2020–2021	BPL	19	1	3	0	3	0	25	1
Bashundhara Kings	2021–22	BPL	9	0	0	0	2	0	11	0
Bashundhara Kings	Career total		75	7	3	0	6	0	84	7

=== International goals ===
==== U23 ====
Scores and results list Bangladesh's goal tally first.

No.	Date	Venue	Opponent	Score	Result	Competition
1.	6 August 2018	Mokpo International Football Center, Mokpo, South Korea	(South Korea) Chodang University FC	1-1	3–1	Unofficial Friendly
2.	26 March 2019	Khalifa Sports City Stadium, Isa Town, Bahrain	Sri Lanka U23	1–0	2–0	2020 AFC U-23 Championship qualification

==== Senior ====
Scores and results list Bangladesh's goal tally first.

No.	Date	Venue	Opponent	Score	Result	Competition
1.	1 October 2018	Sylhet District Stadium, Sylhet, Bangladesh	Laos	1–0	1–0	2018 Bangabandhu Cup
2.	29 September 2019	Bangabandhu National Stadium, Dhaka, Bangladesh	Bhutan	3–1	4–1	FIFA Friendly
–.	7 November 2019	Muscat, Oman	(Oman) Muscat Club	2–1	3–1	Unofficial Friendly
3.	14 November 2019	Sultan Qaboos Sports Complex, Muscat, Oman	Oman	1–3	1–4	2022 FIFA World Cup qualification
