= Abdelatif Bahdari =

Palestinian footballer

Personal information
- Full name: Abdelatif Bahdari
- Date of birth: 20 February 1984 (age 42)
- Place of birth: Gaza City, Gaza
- Height: 1.95 m (6 ft 5 in)
- Position: Centre back

Team information
- Current team: Mosaset Al Bireh

Youth career
- 1996–1999: Khadamat Rafah
- 1999–2001: Shabab Rafah

Senior career*
| Years | Team | Apps | (Gls) |
| 2001–2003 | Gaza Sport | | |
| 2002–2004 | Al-Meshtal | | |
| 2004–2009 | Khadamat Rafah | | |
| 2007–2008 | → Al-Am'ary (loan) | | |
| 2008–2009 | → Hilal Ariha (loan) | 22 | (7) |
| 2009–2011 | Al-Wehdat | 38 | (5) |
| 2011–2013 | Hajer | 37 | (7) |
| 2013–2014 | Zakho | 20 | (1) |
| 2014–2015 | Al-Wehdat | 19 | (4) |
| 2015–2016 | Shabab Al-Khalil | | |
| 2016–2017 | Tala'ea El-Gaish SC | 4 | (0) |
| 2017 | Abnaa Al-Quds | | |
| 2017–2018 | Shabab Al-Khalil | | |
| 2018–2022 | Markaz Balata | | (6+) |
| 2022–2023 | Shabab Al-Khalil | | |
| 2023– | Mosaset Al Bireh | | |

International career
| 2007–2021 | Palestine | 82 | (9) |
- * Club domestic league appearances and goals as of 22 February 2020

Abdelatif Bahdari (Arabic: عَبْد اللَّطِيف الْبَهْدَارِيّ; born 20 February 1984) is a Palestinian professional footballer who plays as a centre back for Mosaset Al Bireh. From 2007 to 2021, he earned 82 caps for Palestine national football team.

== Club career ==
=== Al-Wehdat ===
Bahdari began his professional career when he moved to Jordanian Al-Wahdat in the summer of 2009. In his first year, Bahdari and fellow countryman Ahmed Keshkesh helped Al-Wahdat secure the Jordan FA Cup.

=== Hajer ===
Bahdari's season saw him attract the attention of many clubs in the West Bank, Kuwait, and Saudi Arabia. It was initially thought that Bahdari would join Kuwait SC. He was also linked with Kuwaiti club Al-Nasr, he eventually signed with Shabab Al-Khaleel of the West Bank Premier League but the contract included a get-out clause if Bahdari received a professional contract from a club based abroad. On 1 July 2011 Bahdari signed a two-year deal with newly promoted Hajer Club of the Saudi Professional League. His salary (a rumored $280,000/yr.) would make him the best paid Palestinian athlete.

Bahdari captained Hajer on more than one occasion in the Saudi topflight for the Al-Hasa-based side. Bahdari's was Hajer's second top-scorer with 3 league goals and was second in total minutes played. He was only held out of 4 league matches due to card accumulation, threat of card accumulation, or injury.

== International career ==
Bahdari captained the Palestinian national team in their first home World Cup qualifier against Afghanistan on 3 July 2011. He took over the captaincy on a full-time basis in 2015 during 2018 FIFA World Cup qualification

=== International goals ===
Scores and results list Palestine's goal tally first.

| Goal | Date | Venue | Opponent | Score | Result | Competition |
|---|---|---|---|---|---|---|
| 1. | 6 September 2014 | Rizal Memorial Stadium, Manila, Philippines | Chinese Taipei | 5–3 | 7–3 | 2014 Philippine Peace Cup |
| 2. | 29 March 2016 | Dora International Stadium, Hebron, Palestine | Timor-Leste | 7–0 | 7–0 | 2018 FIFA World Cup qualification |
| 3. | 10 November 2016 | Camille Chamoun Sports City Stadium, Beirut, Lebanon | Lebanon | 1–1 | 1–1 | Friendly |
| 4. | 5 September 2017 | Changlimithang Stadium, Thimphu, Bhutan | Bhutan | 2–0 | 2–0 | 2019 AFC Asian Cup qualification |
| 5. | 10 October 2017 | Dora International Stadium, Hebron, Palestine | Bhutan | 1–0 | 10–0 | 2019 AFC Asian Cup qualification |
| 6. | 10 October 2017 | Dora International Stadium, Hebron, Palestine | Bhutan | 5–0 | 10–0 | 2019 AFC Asian Cup qualification |
| 7. | 10 October 2017 | Dora International Stadium, Hebron, Palestine | Bhutan | 6–0 | 10–0 | 2019 AFC Asian Cup qualification |
| 8. | 4 October 2018 | Sylhet District Stadium, Sylhet, Bangladesh | Tajikistan | 2–0 | 2–0 | 2018 Bangabandhu Cup |
| 9. | 11 June 2019 | Dolen Omurzakov Stadium, Bishkek, Kyrgyzstan | Kyrgyzstan | 2–2 | 2–2 | Friendly |

== Honours ==
Al-Wehdat

- Jordan Premier League: 2010–11, 2014–15
- Jordan FA Cup: 2009–10, 2010–11
- Jordan FA Shield: 2010
- Jordan Super Cup: 2009, 2010
- West Bank Premier League: 2015/16

Palestine

- AFC Challenge Cup: 2014
- Bangabandhu Gold Cup: 2018

Individual

- Bangabandhu Gold Cup MVP: 2018
