= Mohammed Balah =

Palestinian footballer (born 1993)

Personal information
- Full name: Mohammed Majed Mohammed Balah
- Date of birth: 4 September 1993 (age 33)
- Place of birth: Gaza, Palestine
- Height: 1.88 m (6 ft 2 in)
- Position: Forward

Team information
- Current team: Ahed
- Number: 99

Youth career
- 2005–2010: Al-Sadaqa

Senior career*
Years	Team	Apps	(Gls)
2013–2017	Al-Sadaqa	70	(42)
2017–2018	Al-Ahli	12	(2)
2018	That Ras	7	(2)
2019	Al-Orouba	10	(10)
2019–2020	Saham	9	(6)
2020	Al-Suwaiq	6	(4)
2021	Al-Sadaqa	8	(7)
2022–2023	Al-Masry		
2023–2024	Al-Sadaqa		
2024–2025	Al Mokawloon Al Arab		
2025–2026	Al Shahaniya	9	(1)
2026–	Ahed	2	(0)

International career
2017–2019	Palestine	9	(1)
- * Club domestic league appearances and goals as of 23 October 2026

Mohammed Majed Mohammed Balah (Arabic: محمد ماجد محمد بلح; born 4 September 1993) is a Palestinian professional footballer who plays as a forward for Lebanese Premier League club Ahed. He previously played for the Palestine national team.

== Early life ==
Balah was born in Gaza City on 4 September 1993. He grew up in a family with three brothers and one sister and attended schools run by the UNRWA before continuing his education at government schools. He later graduated from the College of Law and Judicial Practice at the University of Palestine.

Balah began playing football as a child in his neighbourhood and joined the youth system of the Palestinian club Al-Sadaqa at the age of 12. He progressed through the club's youth teams before establishing himself in its senior side.

== Club career ==
=== Al-Sadaqa ===
Balah began his senior career with Al-Sadaqa in 2013. He became a regular attacking player for the Gaza-based club and helped it win the Gaza Strip Premier League in 2016–17. He was named the league's best player for the 2016–17 season, during which he was also among its leading goalscorers.

=== Spells in Jordan and Oman ===
In 2017, Balah moved to Jordan to join Al-Ahli. He subsequently played for That Ras before moving to Oman, where he represented Al-Orouba, Saham, and Al-Suwaiq.

Balah scored regularly during his time in Oman. In December 2020, he moved from Saham to Al-Suwaiq, continuing to play in the Oman Professional League.

=== Return to Al-Sadaqa and Al-Masry ===
Balah returned to Al-Sadaqa in 2021. During the club's participation in the latter part of the Gaza Strip Premier League season, he scored seven goals and provided three assists in eight appearances.

In September 2021, Balah signed for Egyptian Premier League club Al-Masry on a contract reported to run for four seasons, through 2024–25. His first season was disrupted by illness and injuries. After being limited to a small number of appearances, he sustained an anterior cruciate ligament injury to his right knee in April 2022, requiring surgery and an extended period of rehabilitation.

=== Al-Shahaniya ===
On 27 October 2025, Balah joined Qatari club Al-Shahaniya.

=== Ahed ===
In October 2026, Balah joined Lebanese Premier League club Ahed.

== International career ==
Balah made his debut for the Palestine national team in 2017 under head coach Abdel Nasser Barakat. He was part of the national team during its qualification campaign for the 2019 AFC Asian Cup, which Palestine reached for the second time in its history.

During his international career, Balah made appearances for Palestine in matches against several national teams. He was also part of the Palestinian squad that won the 2018 Bangabandhu Cup, defeating Tajikistan in the final on penalties.

== Honours ==
Al-Sadaqa

- Gaza Strip Premier League: 2016–17

Palestine

- Bangabandhu Cup: 2018

Individual

- Palestinian Premier League Player of the Season: 2016–17
