= Kumaahran Sathasivam =

Malaysian footballer

S. Kumaahran
Personal information
- Full name: Kumaahran a/l Sathasivam
- Date of birth: 3 July 1996 (age 30)
- Place of birth: Penang, Malaysia
- Height: 1.68 m (5 ft 6 in)
- Position: Forward

Team information
- Current team: Sabah
- Number: 12

Senior career*
Years	Team	Apps	(Gls)
2015	Harimau Muda	14	(1)
2016–2017	Penang	36	(5)
2018–2021	Johor Darul Ta'zim	0	(0)
2018–2021	Johor Darul Ta'zim II	19	(2)
2020	→ Pahang (loan)	10	(0)
2021	→ Melaka United (loan)	15	(4)
2022	Petaling Jaya City	21	(3)
2023–	Sabah	8	(0)

International career^{‡}
2015–	Malaysia U-23	8	(1)
2015–	Malaysia	4	(0)
Medal record
Men's football
Representing Malaysia
Second place	2017 Kuala Lumpur
- * Club domestic league appearances and goals as of November 9, 2022 ‡ National team caps and goals as of August 27, 2017

Kumaahran a/l Sathasivam (born 3 July 1996) is a Malaysian footballer who plays as a forward for Sabah in the Malaysia Super League.

== Club career ==
Kumaahran began his senior career playing in Singapore, representing Harimau Muda in the 2015 S.League.

In 2016, he made a move to the Malaysian Super League by signing for the newly promoted Penang FA.

== International career ==
In August 2015, Kumaahran was selected by Dollah Salleh, the national head coach, to be part of the twenty-two men squad for the matches against Bangladesh, the UAE and Saudi Arabia. At a young age of 19, he earned his first international cap in the match against Bangladesh. In that match, he came on as a substitute for Nor Farhan Muhammad in the 73rd minute.

== International goals ==
=== Malaysia Under-23 ===
As of September 2017.

#	Date	Venue	Opponent	Result	Goal	Competition
1.	5 February 2015	Sylhet District Stadium, Sylhet, Bangladesh	Singapore	1–0	1	2015 Bangabandhu Cup
2.	8 February 2015	Bangabandhu National Stadium, Dhaka, Bangladesh	Bangladesh	3–2	1	2015 Bangabandhu Cup
3.	26 March 2017	Theab Awana, Dubai, United Arab Emirates	Singapore	3–1	1	Dubai Cup.

== Honours ==
=== Club ===
Johor Darul Ta'zim II F.C.

- Malaysia Challenge Cup(1): 2019

=== International ===
Malaysia U-23

- Bangabandhu Cup
  - Winner (1): 2015
- SEA Games : (silver) Silver 2017
