= 1999 Bangabandhu Cup =

Tournament details
- Country: Bangladesh
- Dates: 27 August – 7 September
- Teams: 12

Final positions
- Champions: Japan Third Division XI (1st title)
- Runners-up: Ghana U-23

Tournament statistics
- Matches played: 15
- Goals scored: 51 (3.4 per match)
- Top goal scorer: (South Korea) Lee Chun-soo (7 goals)
- All statistics correct as of 29 March 2019.

1999 Bangabandhu Cup was the 2nd season of the Bangabandhu Cup, after the first edition was held in 1996–97. The second edition ran from 27 August 1999 to 7 September 1999. A Japanese Third Division XI went on to win the cup after defeating the Ghana U-23 team 3–2 in the finals.

Bangabandhu Cup was discontinued after the 1999 edition due to the political situation in the country, and relaunched again in 2015.

== Format ==
In group stage twelve teams divided into four groups of three teams, playing a single match round-robin. The teams finishing first in each group qualified for the Semi-finals.

== Group stage ==
=== Group A ===
Team	Pld	W	D	L	GF	GA	GD	Pts
(Hungary) III. Kerületi FC	2	1	1	0	5	4	+1	4
Bangladesh	2	1	1	0	3	2	+1	4
Malaysia U-23	2	0	0	2	2	4	−2	0

Source: BFF
28 August 1999

(Hungary) Kerületi FC	3–2	Malaysia U-23
Sitku		Nizaruddin; Lim Chau-Yew

Bangabandhu National Stadium, Dhaka
Attendance: 10,000

31 August 1999

Bangladesh	1–0	Malaysia U-23
Dawn 29'

Bangabandhu National Stadium, Dhaka

3 September 1999

Bangladesh	2–2	(Hungary) Kerületi FC
Jewel (pen.), 85'; Masoud 88'		Sitku

Bangabandhu National Stadium, Dhaka

=== Group B ===
Team	Pld	W	D	L	GF	GA	GD	Pts
South Korea U-20	2	2	0	0	9	2	+7	6
Brazil League XI	2	1	0	1	1	2	−1	3
Thailand U-23	2	0	0	2	2	8	−6	0

Source: BFF
29 August 1999

South Korea U-20	7–2	Thailand U–23
Lee Chun-soo; Choi Tae-uk; Chun Jae-woon; Nirut Surasiang (o.g.)		Bamrung Boonprom

Bangabandhu National Stadium, Dhaka

31 August 1999

Brazil League XI	1–0	Thailand U-23
Hugo

Bangabandhu National Stadium, Dhaka

3 September 1999

South Korea U-20	2–0	Brazil League XI
Lee Chun-soo

Bangabandhu National Stadium, Dhaka

=== Group C ===
Team	Pld	W	D	L	GF	GA	GD	Pts
Ghana U-23	2	2	0	0	6	1	+5	6
Uzbekistan League XI	2	1	0	1	1	4	−3	3
Nepal	2	0	0	2	1	3	−2	0

Source: BFF
28 August 1999

Ghana U-23	2–1	Nepal

Bangabandhu National Stadium, Dhaka

30 August 1999

Nepal	0–1	Uzbekistan League XI

Bangabandhu National Stadium, Dhaka

2 September 1999

Ghana U-23	4–0	Uzbekistan League XI

Bangabandhu National Stadium, Dhaka

=== Group D ===
Team	Pld	W	D	L	GF	GA	GD	Pts
Japan Third Division XI	2	2	0	0	6	0	+6	6
Kuwait U-23	2	1	0	1	2	1	+1	3
(Indonesia) Semen Padang	2	0	0	2	0	7	−7	0

Source: BFF
27 August 1999

Japanese Third Division XI (Japan)	5–0	(Indonesia) Semen Padang
Matsuki; Suzuki; Watanabe

Bangabandhu National Stadium, Dhaka

30 August 1999

Kuwait U-23	2–0	(Indonesia) Semen Padang
Al Dwaisan; Darweesh Ahmed

Bangabandhu National Stadium, Dhaka

2 September 1999

Kuwait U-23	0–1	(Japan) Japanese Third Division XI
		Matsuki

Bangabandhu National Stadium, Dhaka

== Knockout stage ==
Semi-finals
(Hungary) Kerületi FC	1
Ghana U-23	2
(Japan) Japanese Third Division XI	3
South Korea U-20	2

Final
(Japan) Japanese Third Division XI	3
Ghana U-23	2

=== Semi-finals ===
5 September 1999

Kerületi FC (Hungary)	1–2	Ghana U-23
Sitku		Osei

Bangabandhu National Stadium, Dhaka
5 September 1999

Japanese Third Division XI (Japan)	3–2	South Korea U-20
Yokose; Suzuki; Watanabe		Cho Jae-jin; Lee Chun-soo

Bangabandhu National Stadium, Dhaka
Attendance: 10,000

=== Final ===
7 September 1999

Japanese Third Division XI (Japan)	3–2	Ghana U-23
Kataoka; Takahashi		Razak; Amadu

Bangabandhu National Stadium, Dhaka
Attendance: 35,000

== Winners ==
1999 Bangabandhu Cup Champion
Japan Football League (Third Division) XI
First title

== Team statistics ==
Table shows each team's achievements.

Pos	Team	Pld	W	D	L	GF	GA	GD	Pts	Result
1	(Japan) Japanese Third Division XI	4	4	0	0	12	4	+8	12	Final
2	Ghana U-23	4	3	0	1	10	5	+5	9	Final
3	South Korea U-20	3	2	0	1	11	5	+6	6	Semi-finals
4	(Hungary) Kerületi FC	3	1	1	1	6	6	0	4	Semi-finals
5	Bangladesh	2	1	1	0	3	2	+1	4	Eliminated in the group stage
6	Kuwait U-23	2	1	0	1	2	1	+1	3	Eliminated in the group stage
7	Brazil League XI	2	1	0	1	1	2	−1	3	Eliminated in the group stage
8	Uzbekistan League XI	2	1	0	1	1	4	−3	3	Eliminated in the group stage
9	Malaysia U-23	2	0	0	2	2	4	−2	0	Eliminated in the group stage
10	Nepal	2	0	0	2	1	3	−2	0	Eliminated in the group stage
11	Thailand U-23	2	0	0	2	2	8	−6	0	Eliminated in the group stage
12	(Indonesia) Semen Padang	2	0	0	2	0	7	−7	0	Eliminated in the group stage

Source: BFF
