= Jonathan Cantillana =

Palestinian footballer (born 1992)

Personal information
- Full name: Jonathan Eduardo Cantillana Zorrilla
- Date of birth: 26 May 1992 (age 34)
- Place of birth: Santiago, Chile
- Height: 1.80 m (5 ft 11 in)
- Position: Midfielder

Youth career
- Palestino

Senior career*
Years	Team	Apps	(Gls)
2012–2014	San Antonio Unido	37	(6)
2014–2016	Palestino	16	(2)
2014	→ San Antonio Unido (loan)	11	(0)
2016	→ Ahli Al-Khaleel (loan)		
2016	Kuala Lumpur	12	(7)
2017	Ahli Al-Khaleel		
2017	ENPPI		
2018–2019	Hilal Al-Quds		
2019–2022	PSIS Semarang	59	(14)
2023	PSS Sleman	9	(1)
2024	Al-Shomooa		
2024–2025	Maziya		
2025	Lalitpur City	2	(3)
2025–2026	Al-Shomooa		
2026	Machhindra		
2026	Thimphu City	15	(2)

International career^{‡}
2015–	Palestine	36	(10)
- * Club domestic league appearances and goals as of 29 July 2026 ‡ National team caps and goals as of 19 November 2024

Jonathan Eduardo Cantillana Zorrilla (Arabic: جوناثان كانتيانا; born 26 May 1992) is a professional footballer who plays as a midfielder. Born in Chile, he plays for the Palestine national team.

== Club career ==
A product of Palestino youth system, Cantillana made his professional debut playing on loan at San Antonio Unido in the Chilean Segunda División.

On 16 June 2016, Cantillana joined Malaysian side Kuala Lumpur FA. He moved to Indonesian side PSIS Semarang on 8 September 2019.

In 2024, Cantillana joined Libyan club Al-Shomooa SC alongside his Palestinian-Chilean compatriot Camilo Saldaña. In September of the same year, he switched to Maldivian club Maziya S&RC.

== International career ==
Cantillana was born and raised in Chile to Chilean parents of Palestinian descent. He was called up to the Palestine national team, and made his debut on 31 August 2015 in a friendly match away to Lebanon at the Saida Municipal Stadium.

== Personal life ==
Cantillana is Palestinian through his great-grandfather's heritage.

== Career statistics ==
As of match played 19 November 2024

Appearances and goals by national team and year
National team	Year	Apps	Goals
Palestine	2015	4	1
Palestine	2016	4	3
Palestine	2017	6	4
Palestine	2018	11	2
Palestine	2019	2	0
Palestine	2023	3	0
Palestine	2024	6	0
Total		36	10

Scores and results list Palestine's goal tally first.

Goal	Date	Venue	Opponent	Score	Result	Competition
1.	12 November 2015	Amman International Stadium, Amman, Jordan	Malaysia	1–0	6–0	2018 FIFA World Cup qualification
2.	29 March 2016	Dura International Stadium, Dura, Palestine	Timor-Leste	2–0	7–0	2018 FIFA World Cup qualification
3.	29 March 2016	Dura International Stadium, Dura, Palestine	Timor-Leste	5–0	7–0	2018 FIFA World Cup qualification
4.	5 October 2016	Pamir Stadium, Dushanbe, Tajikistan	Tajikistan	1–1	3–3	Friendly
5.	13 June 2017	Faisal Al-Husseini International Stadium, Al-Ram, Palestine	Oman	1–0	2–1	2019 AFC Asian Cup qualification
6.	10 October 2017	Dura International Stadium, Dura, Palestine	Bhutan	9–0	10–0	2019 AFC Asian Cup qualification
7.	10 October 2017	Dura International Stadium, Dura, Palestine	Bhutan	10–0	10–0	2019 AFC Asian Cup qualification
8.	14 November 2017	Faisal Al-Husseini International Stadium, Al-Ram, Palestine	Maldives	7–1	8–1	2019 AFC Asian Cup qualification
9.	4 October 2018	Sylhet District Stadium, Sylhet, Bangladesh	Tajikistan	1–0	2–0	2018 Bangabandhu Cup
10.	24 December 2018	Abdullah bin Khalifa Stadium, Doha, Qatar	Iran	1–1	1–1	Friendly

== Honour ==
Palestine

- Bangabandhu Cup: 2018
