= Mahmoud Abu Warda =

Palestinian footballer

Personal information
- Full name: Mahmoud Abu Warda
- Date of birth: 31 May 1995 (age 31)
- Place of birth: Balata, Nablus Governorate, Palestine
- Height: 1.70 m (5 ft 7 in)
- Position: Winger

Team information
- Current team: Al-Wehdat

Senior career*
Years	Team	Apps	(Gls)
2013–2015	Markaz Balata		
2015–2016	Shabab Al-Khalil		
2016–2017	Markaz Balata		
2017–2018	Shabab Al-Khalil		
2018–2021	Markaz Balata		
2021–2022	Hilal Al-Quds		
2022–2023	Shabab Al-Khalil		
2023–2024	Markaz Balata		
2024	→ Al-Ittihad (loan)		
2024–2026	Al-Tahaddy	35	(6)
2026–	Al-Wehdat	0	(0)

International career^{‡}
2013–2015	Palestine U20		
2017–2018	Palestine U23		
2014–	Palestine	40	(3)
- * Club domestic league appearances and goals as of 27 August 2026 ‡ National team caps and goals as of 14 November 2024

Mahmoud Abu Warda (Arabic: محمود أبو وردة; born 31 May 1995) is a Palestinian professional footballer who plays as a winger for Jordanian Pro League club Al-Wehdat and the Palestine national team.

== Career statistics ==
=== International goals ===
As of match played on 6 September 2023. Palestine score listed first, score column indicates score after each Abu Warda goal.

Goal	Date	Venue	Opponent	Score	Result	Competition
1	17 January 2020	Bangabandhu National Stadium, Dhaka, Bangladesh	Sri Lanka	1–0	2–0	2020 Bangabandhu Cup
2	14 June 2022	MFF Football Centre, Ulaanbaatar, Mongolia	Philippines	4–0	4–0	2023 AFC Asian Cup qualification
3	6 September 2023	Sultan Qaboos Sports Complex, Muscat, Oman	Oman	1–0	1–2	Friendly

== Honours ==
Palestine

- Bangabandhu Cup: 2020
