= Layth Kharoub =

Palestinian footballer (born 1991)

Personal information
- Full name: Layth Ali Abdulrahim Kharoub
- Date of birth: 11 July 1991 (age 35)
- Place of birth: Nablus, Palestine
- Height: 1.80 m (5 ft 11 in)
- Position: Winger

Team information
- Current team: Al-Borouq

Senior career*
Years	Team	Apps	(Gls)
2011–2013	Thaqafi Tulkarem		
2013–2014	Shabab Al-Bireh Institute		
2014–2015	Shabab Al-Dhahiriya		
2015–2017	Shabab Al-Khalil		
2016–2017	Ahli Al-Khaleel		
2017	Shabab Al-Dhahiriya		
2017–2018	Thaqafi Tulkarem		
2018	Shabab Al-Dhahiriya		
2018	Markaz Balata		
2021	Jabal Al-Mokabber Al-Maqdisi Club		
2022	Markaz Balata		
2022	Shabab Al-Samu		
2023–2024	Shabab Al-Dhahiriya		
2024–2025	Kelantan Darul Naim		
2025–	Al-Borouq		

International career^{‡}
2020–	Palestine	11	(5)
- * Club domestic league appearances and goals ‡ National team caps and goals as of 4 December 2021

Layth Ali Abdulrahim Kharoub (Arabic: ليث علي عبد الرحيم خروب; born 11 July 1991) is a Palestinian footballer who plays as a winger for Libyan Premier League club Al-Borouq and the Palestine national team.

== Club career ==
On 15 January 2017, Kharoub joined Ahli Al-Khaleel. After joining Shabab Al-Dhahiriya in summer 2017, Kharoub returned to Thaqafi Tulkarem on 27 December of the same year.

== International career ==
Kharoub represented Palestine at the 2020 Bangabandhu Cup; he scored on his debut on 15 January, helping Palestine beat hosts Bangladesh 2–0 in the group stage. Kharoub scored three goals in the tournament, including one in the final on 25 January against Burundi, won 3–1, to help Palestine win the competition.

== Career statistics ==
=== International ===
As of match played 11 December 2021

Appearances and goals by national team and year
National team	Year	Apps	Goals
Palestine	2020	4	3
Palestine	2021	7	2
Total		11	5

Scores and results list Palestine's goal tally first, score column indicates score after each Kharoub goal.

List of international goals scored by Layth Kharoub
No.	Date	Venue	Opponent	Score	Result	Competition	Ref.
1	15 January 2020	Bangabandhu National Stadium, Dhaka, Bangladesh	Bangladesh	2–0	2–0	2020 Bangabandhu Cup	
2	22 January 2020	Bangabandhu National Stadium, Dhaka, Bangladesh	Seychelles	1–0	1–0	2020 Bangabandhu Cup	
3	25 January 2020	Bangabandhu National Stadium, Dhaka, Bangladesh	Burundi	3–0	3–1	2020 Bangabandhu Cup	
4	24 June 2021	Jassim bin Hamad Stadium, Doha, Qatar	Comoros	1–1	5–1	2021 FIFA Arab Cup qualification	
5	5 September 2021	Dolen Omurzakov Stadium, Bishkek, Kyrgyzstan	Bangladesh	1–0	2–0	2021 Three Nations Cup	

== Honours ==
Palestine

- Bangabandhu Cup: 2020
