= Phuntsho Jigme =

Bhutanese footballer (born 1997)

Personal information
- Full name: Phuntsho Jigme
- Date of birth: 11 September 1997 (age 29)
- Place of birth: Bhutan
- Height: 1.83 m (6 ft 0 in)
- Position: Center-back

Senior career*
Years	Team	Apps	(Gls)
2018–2019	Thimphu		
2019–2025	Thimphu City		
2026–	Drukpa		

International career^{‡}
2018–	Bhutan	10	(0)
- * Club domestic league appearances and goals ‡ National team caps and goals as of 4 June 2026

Phuntsho Jigme (born 11 September 1997) is a Bhutanese professional footballer who plays as a center-back for Bhutan Premier League club Durkpa FC and the Bhutan national team.

== Club career ==
He was the most valuable player of the 2021 Bhutan Premier League.

== International career ==
His first appearance for Bhutan was in the 2018 SAFF Championship playing against Bangladesh. He was a substitute player for Bhutan in the 2019 South Asian Games.
