= Khaled Salem =

Palestinian footballer

Personal information
- Full name: Khaled Jamal Abdulrahman Salem
- Date of birth: 17 November 1989 (age 36)
- Place of birth: Nablus, Palestine
- Height: 1.88 m (6 ft 2 in)
- Position: Forward

Team information
- Current team: Markaz Balata
- Number: 45

Youth career
- 2005–2007: Merkaz Tulkarem

Senior career*
Years	Team	Apps	(Gls)
2007–2011	Merkaz Tulkarem		
2011–2013	Shabab Al-Dhahrieh		
2013–2014	→ Markaz Tulkarem (loan)		
2014–2018	Hilal Al-Quds		
2018	Markaz Tulkarem		
2018–2019	Markaz Balata		
2019–2020	Shabab Al-Khalil		
2020–2021	Markaz Tulkarem		
2021	Markaz Balata		
2021–2022	Al-Hidd		
2022–	Markaz Balata		

International career
2009–2013	Palestine U23	7	(3)
2011–2021	Palestine	39	(6)
- * Club domestic league appearances and goals

Khaled Jamal Abdulrahman Salem (Arabic: خالد جمال عبد الرحمن سالم; born 17 November 1989) is a Palestinian footballer who plays for West Bank Premier League club Markaz Balata.

== Club career ==
On 24 May 2021, he led his team to their first AFC Cup victory over Bahrain's Al-Muharraq 3–2 by scoring all three goals. A few days later, he moved abroad, where he signed with Al-Hidd.

== International career ==
Salem received his first national team cap against Indonesia on 22 August 2011.

== Career statistics ==
=== International ===
Scores and results list Palestine's goal tally first.

#	Date	Venue	Opponent	Score	Result	Competition
1.	4 March 2013	Dasarath Rangasala Stadium, Kathmandu, Nepal	Northern Mariana Islands	1–0	9–0	2014 AFC Challenge Cup qualification
2.	4 March 2013	Dasarath Rangasala Stadium, Kathmandu, Nepal	Northern Mariana Islands	6–0	9–0	2014 AFC Challenge Cup qualification
3.	4 March 2013	Dasarath Rangasala Stadium, Kathmandu, Nepal	Northern Mariana Islands	7–0	9–0	2014 AFC Challenge Cup qualification
4.	26 March 2013	Darulmakmur Stadium, Kuantan, Malaysia	Malaysia	1–0	2–0	Friendly
5.	6 June 2017	Bahrain National Stadium, Riffa, Bahrain	Bahrain	1–0	2–0	Friendly
6.	10 October 2017	Dora International Stadium, Hebron, Palestine	Bhutan	7–0	10–0	2019 AFC Asian Cup qualification
7.	6 October 2018	Sylhet District Stadium, Sylhet, Bangladesh	Nepal	1–0	1–0	2018 Bangabandhu Cup
8.	15 January 2020	Bangabandhu National Stadium, Dhaka, Bangladesh	Bangladesh	1–0	2–0	2020 Bangabandhu Cup
9.	17 January 2020	Bangabandhu National Stadium, Dhaka, Bangladesh	Sri Lanka	2–0	2–0	2020 Bangabandhu Cup
10.	25 January 2020	Bangabandhu National Stadium, Dhaka, Bangladesh	Burundi	1–0	3–1	2020 Bangabandhu Cup

== Honours ==
Palestine

- Bangabandhu Cup: 2020
