= Khalil Bader =

Lebanese footballer (born 1999)

- Bader with Lebanon in 2024

Personal information
- Full name: Khalil Abdel Salam Bader
- Date of birth: 27 July 1999 (age 27)
- Place of birth: Barja, Lebanon
- Height: 1.68 m (5 ft 6 in)
- Position: Winger

Team information
- Current team: Ansar
- Number: 27

Youth career
- Nejmeh

Senior career*
Years	Team	Apps	(Gls)
2017–2026	Nejmeh	87	(18)
2018–2019	→ Chabab Ghazieh (loan)	20	(6)
2024	→ Manama (loan)	0	(0)
2024–2025	→ Al-Yarmouk (loan)	8	(0)
2026–	Ansar	13	(2)

International career^{‡}
2017	Lebanon U19	2	(0)
2019–2021	Lebanon U23	8	(1)
2022–	Lebanon	16	(2)
- * Club domestic league appearances and goals as of 12 September 2026 ‡ National team caps and goals as of 17 November 2026

Khalil Abdel Salam Bader (Arabic: خليل عبد السلام بدر; born 27 July 1999) is a Lebanese footballer who plays as a winger for Lebanese Premier League club Ansar and the Lebanon national team.

== Club career ==
=== Nejmeh ===
Bader with Nejmeh in 2020

Bader began his youth career at Nejmeh. He was loaned out to Chabab Ghazieh for the 2018–19 Lebanese Premier League. He finished the season as his team's top scorer, with six goals and five assists.

In September 2019, Nejmeh renewed Bader's contract for an additional three years. In July 2020, Nejmeh officials confirmed that they had rejected an offer for Bader by Tunisian club ES Métlaoui.

On 11 February 2023, Bader scored a hat-trick to help Nejmeh beat Shabab Sahel 4–1 in the 2022–23 Lebanese Premier League. Following extensive negotiations, on 6 June 2023, Nejmeh renewed Bader's contract for three years.

=== Manama and Al-Yarmouk ===
In August 2024, Bader joined Manama in the Bahraini Premier League. He moved to Al-Yarmouk in Kuwait in December, after only four months.

=== Ansar ===
Bader joined Ansar on 11 January 2026 on a permanent transfer.

== International career ==
In 2019, Bader was called up to play for the Lebanon national under-23 team. He made his senior debut for the Lebanon national team on 19 November 2022, as a substitute in a 2–0 friendly defeat to Kuwait in Dubai, United Arab Emirates. On 22 June 2023, Bader scored his first international goal for Lebanon, in a 2–0 win against Bangladesh in the 2023 SAFF Championship.

== Style of play ==
Bader was noted as a promising talent in his youth. He is considered a versatile forward who can also play as a winger.

== Career statistics ==
=== International ===
As of match played 17 November 2026

Appearances and goals by national team and year
National team	Year	Apps	Goals
Lebanon	2022	2	0
Lebanon	2023	9	2
Lebanon	2024	1	0
Lebanon	2025	0	0
Lebanon	2026	4	0
Total		16	2

Scores and results list Lebanon's goal tally first, score column indicates score after each Bader goal.

List of international goals scored by Khalil Bader
No.	Date	Venue	Opponent	Score	Result	Competition
1	22 June 2023	Sree Kanteerava Stadium, Bangalore, India	Bangladesh	2–0	2–0	2023 SAFF Championship
2	25 June 2023	Sree Kanteerava Stadium, Bangalore, India	Bhutan	3–0	4–1	2023 SAFF Championship

== Honours ==
Nejmeh

- Lebanese Premier League: 2023–24
- Lebanese FA Cup: 2021–22, 2022–23
- Lebanese Elite Cup: 2017, 2021
- Lebanese Super Cup: 2023

Ansar

- Lebanese Premier League: 2025–26
