= Jospin Nshimirimana =

Burundian footballer

Personal information
- Date of birth: 12 December 2001 (age 24)
- Place of birth: Mutimbuzi, Burundi
- Height: 1.80 m (5 ft 11 in)
- Position: Midfielder

Team information
- Current team: Vital'O
- Number: 14

Youth career
- New Regime

Senior career*
Years	Team	Apps	(Gls)
–2018	Delta Star		
2018–2021	Aigle Noir Makamba		
2021–2023	Yeni Malatyaspor	40	(1)
2023–2024	Şanlıurfaspor	4	(0)
2024–2025	Vital'O		
2025-	Cape Town City	0	(0)

International career^{‡}
2019	Burundi U20	3	(0)
2019–	Burundi	15	(8)
- * Club domestic league appearances and goals as of 29 January 2024 ‡ National team caps and goals as of 02:17, 2 June 2021 (UTC)

Jospin Nshimirimana (born 12 December 2001) is a Burundian professional footballer who plays as a midfielder for Cape Town City and the Burundi national team.

== Club career ==
=== Burundi ===
Born in Mutimbuzi, Burundi, Nshimirimana began playing football at the age of eight, and his father enrolled him at the local club New Regime. From there, he went on to play at Delta Star in the lower divisions of Burundian football. They achieved promotion into the Burundi Premier League for the 2017–18 season. Although they finished the season in last place, Nshimirimana led his team to a runner-up finish in the 2018 Burundian Cup. He scored a goal in the 4–0 semi-final victory over Olympique Star, who finished fifth in the league.

Nshimirimana made the move to Aigle Noir Makamba in the summer before the 2018–19 season. They won their first-ever league title that year, in addition to winning their first domestic treble after also capturing the Burundian Cup and Super Cup as well as the second-ever Coupe de l'Unité.

=== Yeni Malatyaspor ===
On 2 January 2021, in the final day of the winter transfer window, Turkish Süper Lig side Yeni Malatyaspor announced the signing of Nshimirimana on a three-and-a-half-year contract.

== International career ==
Nshimirimana represented his country at the 2019 Africa U-20 Cup of Nations in Niger, as well as the qualifiers for the tournament the year prior.

He made his senior international debut on 27 July 2019, coming on for Landry Ndikumana in the second half of a match against South Sudan during 2020 African Nations Championship qualification. He scored in the 82nd minute of the 2–0 victory. He received his next call-up ahead of the 2020 Bangabandhu Cup hosted by Bangladesh in January 2020. He scored a hat-trick in their opening match against Mauritius on January 16, which they won 4–1 after conceding the first goal. He added a goal in Burundi's victory over Seychelles two days later, then put up another hat-trick in their semi-final upset of the host team Bangladesh on 23 January. Although they lost in the finals to Palestine, Nshimirimana was named player of the tournament after leading all scorers with seven goals.

== Career statistics ==
=== International ===
As of match played 8 April 2020

National team	Year	Apps	Goals
Burundi	2019	1	1
Burundi	2020	4	7
Total		5	8

Scores and results list Burundi's goal tally first.

Goal	Date	Venue	Opponent	Score	Result	Competition
1	27 July 2019	Prince Louis Rwagasore Stadium, Bujumbura, Burundi	South Sudan	2–0	2–0	2020 African Nations Championship qualification
2	16 January 2020	Bangabandhu National Stadium, Dhaka, Bangladesh	Mauritius	1–1	4–1	2020 Bangabandhu Cup
3	16 January 2020	Bangabandhu National Stadium, Dhaka, Bangladesh	Mauritius	3–1	4–1	2020 Bangabandhu Cup
4	16 January 2020	Bangabandhu National Stadium, Dhaka, Bangladesh	Mauritius	4–1	4–1	2020 Bangabandhu Cup
5	18 January 2020	Bangabandhu National Stadium, Dhaka, Bangladesh	Seychelles	1–1	3–1	2020 Bangabandhu Cup
6	23 January 2020	Bangabandhu National Stadium, Dhaka, Bangladesh	Bangladesh	1–0	3–0	2020 Bangabandhu Cup
7	23 January 2020	Bangabandhu National Stadium, Dhaka, Bangladesh	Bangladesh	2–0	3–0	2020 Bangabandhu Cup
8	23 January 2020	Bangabandhu National Stadium, Dhaka, Bangladesh	Bangladesh	3–0	3–0	2020 Bangabandhu Cup

== Honours ==
Aigle Noir Makamba

- Burundi Premier League: 2018–19
- Burundian Cup: 2019
- Burundian Super Coupe: 2019
- Coupe de l'Unité: 2020

Individual

- Bangabandhu Cup Best Player: 2020
- Bangabandhu Cup top scorer: 2020
