= Tamer Seyam =

Palestinian footballer (born 1992)

Personal information
- Full name: Tamer Mohammed Sobhi Seyam
- Date of birth: 25 November 1992 (age 33)
- Place of birth: Jerusalem
- Height: 1.82 m (6 ft 0 in)
- Position: Forward

Senior career*
Years	Team	Apps	(Gls)
2012–2013	Thaqafi Tulkarem		(17)
2013	Jabal Al-Mukaber		
2014–2016	Shabab Al-Khalil		
2016–2018	Hilal Al-Quds		
2018–2020	Hassania Agadir	35	(4)
2021–2023	Shabab Al-Khalil		
2023–2024	PT Prachuap	16	(3)
2024	Al-Faisaly Amman	3	(0)
2024–2025	Al-Nasr Benghazi	22	(4)
2025–2026	Al-Shamal	17	(1)

International career^{‡}
2014–	Palestine	79	(15)
- * Club domestic league appearances and goals ‡ National team caps and goals as of 6 June 2026 (UTC)

Tamer Mohammed Sobhi Seyam (Arabic: تامر محمد صبحي صيام; born 25 November 1992) is a Palestinian professional footballer who plays as a forward for the Palestine national team.

== Career statistics ==
=== International ===
Scores and results list Palestine's goal tally first.

No	Date	Venue	Opponent	Score	Result	Competition
1.	16 June 2015	Bukit Jalil National Stadium, Kuala Lumpur, Malaysia	Malaysia	3–0	6–0	2018 FIFA World Cup qualification
2.	16 June 2015	Bukit Jalil National Stadium, Kuala Lumpur, Malaysia	Malaysia	6–0	6–0	2018 FIFA World Cup qualification
3.	12 November 2015	Amman International Stadium, Amman, Jordan	Malaysia	5–0	6–0	2018 FIFA World Cup qualification
4.	5 October 2016	Pamir Stadium, Dushanbe, Tajikistan	Tajikistan	2–1	3–3	Friendly
5.	10 October 2017	Dora International Stadium, Hebron, Palestine	Bhutan	3–0	10–0	2019 AFC Asian Cup qualification
6.	11 June 2019	Dolen Omurzakov Stadium, Bishkek, Kyrgyzstan	Kyrgyzstan	1–2	2–2	Friendly
7.	3 June 2021	King Fahd International Stadium, Riyadh, Saudi Arabia	Singapore	1–0	4–0	2022 FIFA World Cup qualification
8.	3 June 2021	King Fahd International Stadium, Riyadh, Saudi Arabia	Singapore	3–0	4–0	2022 FIFA World Cup qualification
9.	24 June 2021	Jassim bin Hamad Stadium, Doha, Qatar	Comoros	3–1	5–1	2021 FIFA Arab Cup qualification
10.	24 June 2021	Jassim bin Hamad Stadium, Doha, Qatar	Comoros	4–1	5–1	2021 FIFA Arab Cup qualification
11.	7 December 2021	Stadium 974, Doha, Qatar	Jordan	1–2	1–5	2021 FIFA Arab Cup
12.	14 June 2022	MFF Football Centre, Ulaanbaatar, Mongolia	Philippines	2–0	4–0	2023 AFC Asian Cup qualification
13.	14 January 2024	Education City Stadium, Al Rayyan, Qatar	Iran	1–3	1–4	2023 AFC Asian Cup
14.	20 March 2025	Amman International Stadium, Amman, Jordan	Jordan	1–2	1–3	2026 FIFA World Cup qualification
15.	5 June 2025	Jaber Al-Ahmad International Stadium, Kuwait City, Kuwait	Kuwait	1–0	2–0	2026 FIFA World Cup qualification

== Honours ==
Palestine

- AFC Challenge Cup: 2014
