= 2018 Bangabandhu Cup =

2018 Bangabandhu Gold Cup

Tournament details
- Host country: Bangladesh
- Dates: 1–12 October 2018
- Teams: 6 (from 1 confederation)
- Venues: 3 (in 3 host cities)

Final positions
- Champions: Palestine (1st title)
- Runners-up: Tajikistan

Tournament statistics
- Matches played: 9
- Goals scored: 15 (1.67 per match)
- Top scorer: (Tajikistan) Komron Tursunov (2 goals)
- Best player: (Palestine) Abdelatif Bahdari

The 2018 Bangabandhu Gold Cup or simply 2018 Bangabandhu Cup was an international association football tournament organized by the Bangladesh Football Federation (BFF) as a tribute to Sheikh Mujibur Rahman. This was the 5th edition of the tournament with six teams competing from 1 to 12 October 2018.

== Participating teams ==
Six nations competed in the tournament. BFF president Kazi Salahuddin has previously stated that the BFF wanted to get one team from each of the Asian Football Confederation's sub-confederations. Afghanistan was also reported as a potential participant. All teams were the first teams except for the Philippines which brought their second team.

Country	FIFA Ranking^{1}	Previous best performance
Bangladesh (Host)	193	Runners-up (2015)
Laos	178	N/A (Debut)
Nepal	160	Winners (2016)
Palestine	100	N/A (Debut)
Philippines	114	N/A (Debut)
Tajikistan	120	N/A (Debut)

== Draw ==
The draw took place on 1 September 2018 at the Le Méridien Dhaka Hotel in Dhaka. The six teams were drawn into two groups with three teams each for the group stage.

== Venues ==
Matches were played in three venues. The Sylhet District Stadium in Sylhet hosted the group stage matches while the Cox's Bazar Stadium in Cox's Bazar hosted the semifinals. The Bangabandhu National Stadium in Dhaka was the venue for the final.

Dhaka	Sylhet	Cox's Bazar
Bangabandhu National Stadium	Sylhet District Stadium	Cox's Bazar Stadium
Capacity: 36,000	Capacity: 25,000	Capacity: 5,000
2018 Bangabandhu Cup is located in Bangladesh

== Officials ==
Referees

- (Turkmenistan) Çarymyrat Kurbanow
- (Oman) Mahmood Al-Majarafi
- (Iraq) Zaid Thamer Mohammed
- (China) Shen Yinhao
- (Bangladesh) Mohamed Mizanur Rahman
- (Bangladesh) Mohammed Jalal Uddin

Assistant Referees

- (Thailand) Rawut Nakarit
- (Sri Lanka) Loku Kasthotage Iran Udayakantha
- (Myanmar) Aung Moe
- (India) Sarar Asit Kumar
- (Bangladesh) Mohammad Shah Alam
- (Bangladesh) Mahmud Hasan Mamud

== Group stage ==
- Times listed are UTC+6:00.

=== Group A ===
Pos	Team	Pld	W	D	L	GF	GA	GD	Pts	Qualification
1	Palestine	2	2	0	0	3	0	+3	6	Advance to knockout stage
2	Tajikistan	2	1	0	1	2	2	0	3	Advance to knockout stage
3	Nepal	2	0	0	2	0	3	−3	0	

Source: Soccerway
2 October 2018
18:30

Nepal	0–2	Tajikistan
	Report	Fatkhuloev 27' (pen.); Tursunov 69'

Sylhet District Stadium, Sylhet
Attendance: 6,000
Referee: Shen Yinhao (China)

4 October 2018
18:30

Tajikistan	0–2	Palestine
	Report	Cantillana 1'; Bahdari 75'

Sylhet District Stadium, Sylhet
Referee: Mizanur Rahman (Bangladesh)

6 October 2018
18:30

Palestine	1–0	Nepal
Salem 70'	Report

Sylhet District Stadium, Sylhet
Referee: Mohammed Jalal Uddin (Bangladesh)

=== Group B ===
Pos	Team	Pld	W	D	L	GF	GA	GD	Pts	Qualification
1	Philippines	2	2	0	0	4	1	+3	6	Advance to knockout stage
2	Bangladesh (H)	2	1	0	1	1	1	0	3	Advance to knockout stage
3	Laos	2	0	0	2	1	4	−3	0	

Source: Soccerway
(H) Hosts
1 October 2018
18:30

Bangladesh	1–0	Laos
Biplu 60'	Report

Sylhet District Stadium, Sylhet
Referee: Mahmood Al-Majarafi (Oman)

3 October 2018
18:30

Philippines	3–1	Laos
Bedic 44' (pen.); Gayoso 53'; Bahadoran 82' (pen.)	Report	Kongmathilath 88' (pen.)

Sylhet District Stadium, Sylhet
Referee: Çarymyrat Kurbanow (Turkmenistan)

5 October 2018
18:30

Bangladesh	0–1	Philippines
	Report	Daniels 24'

Sylhet District Stadium, Sylhet
Referee: Zaid Thamer Mohammed (Iraq)

== Knockout stage ==
- Times listed are UTC+6:00
- In the knockout stage, extra-time and a penalty shoot-out was used to decide the winner if necessary.

=== Bracket ===
Semi-finals
9 October – Cox's Bazar
Philippines	0
Tajikistan	2
10 October – Cox's Bazar
Palestine	2
Bangladesh	0

Final
12 October – Dhaka
Tajikistan	0 (3)
Palestine (p)	0 (4)

=== Semi-finals ===
9 October 2018
14:30

Philippines	0–2	Tajikistan
	Report	Tursunov 31'; Nazarov 90+7'

Cox's Bazar Stadium, Cox's Bazar
Referee: Mahmood Al-Majarafi (Oman)

10 October 2018
14:30

Palestine	2–0	Bangladesh
Balah 8'; Maraaba 90+4'	Report

Cox's Bazar Stadium, Cox's Bazar
Referee: Zaid Thamer Mohammed (Iraq)

=== Final ===
12 October 2018
17:30

Tajikistan	0–0 (a.e.t.)	Palestine
	Report
Penalties
O. Abdugafforov (penalty scored); Nazarov (penalty scored); Asrorov (penalty scored); Tursunov (penalty missed); Davlatmir (penalty missed)	3–4	(penalty scored) Cantillana; (penalty scored) Al Iwisat; (penalty scored) Al-Batat; (penalty scored) Bahdari

Bangabandhu National Stadium, Dhaka
Referee: Mizanur Rahman (Bangladesh)

== Goalscorers ==
There were 15 goals scored in 9 matches, for an average of 1.67 goals per match.

2 goals

- (Tajikistan) Komron Tursunov

1 goal

- (Bangladesh) Biplu Ahmed
- (Laos) Phithack Kongmathilath
- (Palestine) Abdelatif Bahdari
- (Palestine) Mohammed Balah
- (Palestine) Jonathan Cantillana
- (Palestine) Sameh Maraaba
- (Palestine) Khaled Salem
- (Philippines) Jovin Bedic
- (Philippines) Misagh Bahadoran
- (Philippines) Kenshiro Daniels
- (Philippines) Javier Gayoso
- (Tajikistan) Fatkhullo Fatkhuloev
- (Tajikistan) Akhtam Nazarov

== Sponsorship ==
Local sports marketing company K-Sports bought the rights for this edition of the tournament and provided all the expenditures.
