= 2020 Bangabandhu Cup =

2020 Bangabandhu Gold Cup

Tournament details
- Host country: Bangladesh
- Dates: 15–25 January
- Teams: 6 (from 2 confederations)
- Venue: 1 (in 1 host city)

Final positions
- Champions: Palestine (2nd title)
- Runners-up: Burundi

Tournament statistics
- Matches played: 9
- Goals scored: 28 (3.11 per match)
- Top scorer: (Burundi) Jospin Nshimirimana (7 goals)
- Best player: (Burundi) Jospin Nshimirimana
- Best goalkeeper: (Palestine) Tawfiq Ali
- Fair play award: Palestine

The 2020 Bangabandhu Gold Cup or simply 2020 Bangabandhu Cup was an international football tournament organized and hosted by the Bangladesh Football Federation (BFF) as a name of tribute to Father of the Nation Bangabandhu Sheikh Mujibur Rahman. This was the 6th edition of the tournament, with six teams competing from 15 to 25 January 2020.

Palestine were the defending champions and successfully defended their title after beating Burundi 3–1 on 25 January 2020.

== Participating nations ==
The FIFA Rankings of participating national teams before the draw, as of 19 December 2019.

Country	FIFA Ranking^{1}	Previous best performance
Bangladesh (Host)	187	Runners-up (2015)
Palestine	106	Champions (2018)
Burundi	151	Debut
Mauritius	172	Debut
Seychelles	200	Debut
Sri Lanka	205	Group stage (2016)

== Draw ==
The draw was held on 4 January 2020 at 12:00 BST at Pan Pacific Hotel Sonargaon in Dhaka. The 6 teams were drawn into 2 groups of 3, by selecting one team from each of the 3 ranked pots.

Pot 1	Pot 2	Pot 3
1. Palestine (106); 2. Burundi (151)	3. Mauritius (172); 4. Bangladesh (187) (H)	5. Seychelles (200); 6. Sri Lanka (205)

== Venue ==
All matches were held at the Bangabandhu National Stadium, Dhaka, Bangladesh.

Dhaka	2020 Bangabandhu Cup is located in Bangladesh
Bangabandhu National Stadium	2020 Bangabandhu Cup is located in Bangladesh
23°43′40.2″N 90°24′48.4″E	2020 Bangabandhu Cup is located in Bangladesh
Capacity: 36,000 seats	2020 Bangabandhu Cup is located in Bangladesh

== Match officials ==
Referees

- (Bangladesh) Mizanur Rahman
- (Bangladesh) Mohammed Jalal Uddin
- (Bhutan) Virendha Rai
- (Malaysia) Yaasin Hanafiah
- (Nepal) Sudish Pandey

Assistant Referees

- (Bangladesh) Manir Ahmmad Dali
- (Bangladesh) Mohammad Nuruzzaman
- (Bhutan) Pema
- (Malaysia) Hariff Akhir
- (Nepal) Rojen Shrestha

== Group stage ==
- Times listed are UTC+6:00 (BST)

=== Group A ===
Pos	Team	Pld	W	D	L	GF	GA	GD	Pts	Qualification
1	Palestine	2	2	0	0	4	0	+4	6	Advance to knockout stage
2	Bangladesh (H)	2	1	0	1	3	2	+1	3	Advance to knockout stage
3	Sri Lanka	2	0	0	2	0	5	−5	0	

Source: GSA
(H) Hosts
15 January 2020
17:00

Bangladesh	0–2	Palestine
	Report	Salem 28'; Kharoub 58'

Bangabandhu National Stadium, Dhaka
Attendance: 6,500
Referee: Sudish Pandey (Nepal)

17 January 2020
17:00

Palestine	2–0	Sri Lanka
Abu Warda 90+3'; Salem 90+6'	Report

Bangabandhu National Stadium, Dhaka
Referee: Yaasin Hanafiah (Malaysia)

19 January 2020
17:00

Sri Lanka	0–3	Bangladesh
	Report	M. Mia 17', 64'; Ibrahim 83'

Bangabandhu National Stadium, Dhaka
Referee: Virendha Rai (Bhutan)

=== Group B ===
Pos	Team	Pld	W	D	L	GF	GA	GD	Pts	Qualification
1	Burundi	2	2	0	0	7	2	+5	6	Advance to knockout stage
2	Seychelles	2	0	1	1	3	5	−2	1	Advance to knockout stage
3	Mauritius	2	0	1	1	3	6	−3	1	

Source: GSA
16 January 2020
17:00

Mauritius	1–4	Burundi
François 3'	Report	Nshimirimana 28', 47', 85'; Ndikumana 41'

Bangabandhu National Stadium, Dhaka
Referee: Mizanur Rahman (Bangladesh)

18 January 2020
17:00

Burundi	3–1	Seychelles
Nshimirimana 54'; Tambwe 60', 61'	Report	Monnaie 26'

Bangabandhu National Stadium, Dhaka
Referee: Mohammed Jalal Uddin (Bangladesh)

20 January 2020
17:00

Seychelles	2–2	Mauritius
Waye-Hive 19'; Monnaie 28'	Report	Ferré 67'; François 90+1'

Bangabandhu National Stadium, Dhaka
Referee: Sudish Pandey (Nepal)

== Knockout stage ==
- Times listed are UTC+6:00 (BST)
- In the knockout stages, if a match finished goalless at the end of normal playing time, extra time would have been played (two periods of 15 minutes each) and followed, if necessary, by a penalty shoot-out to determine the winner.

=== Bracket ===
Semi-finals
22 January – Dhaka
Palestine	1
Seychelles	0
23 January – Dhaka
Burundi	3
Bangladesh	0

Final
25 January – Dhaka
Palestine	3
Burundi	1

=== Semi-finals ===
22 January 2020
17:00

Palestine	1–0	Seychelles
Kharoub 79'	Report

Bangabandhu National Stadium, Dhaka
Referee: Mizanur Rahman (Bangladesh)

23 January 2020
17:00

Burundi	3–0	Bangladesh
Nshimirimana 43', 45+2', 79'	Report

Bangabandhu National Stadium, Dhaka
Referee: Sudish Pandey (Nepal)

=== Final ===
25 January 2020
16:00

Palestine	3–1	Burundi
Salem 3'; Maraaba 10'; Kharoub 26'	Report	Ndikumana 60'

Bangabandhu National Stadium, Dhaka
Referee: Mizanur Rahman (Bangladesh)

== Goalscorers ==
There were 28 goals scored in 9 matches, for an average of 3.11 goals per match.

7 goals

- (Burundi) Jospin Nshimirimana

3 goals

- (Palestine) Layth Kharoub
- (Palestine) Khaled Salem

2 goals

- (Bangladesh) Motin Mia
- (Burundi) Asman Ndikumana
- (Burundi) Amissi Tambwe
- (Mauritius) Adrien François
- (Seychelles) Perry Monnaie

1 goal

- (Bangladesh) Mohammad Ibrahim
- (Mauritius) Jason Ferré
- (Palestine) Mahmoud Abu Warda
- (Palestine) Sameh Maraaba
- (Seychelles) Gervais Waye-Hive

== Sponsorship ==
Local sports marketing company K–Sports bought the rights for this edition of the tournament and provided all the expenditures.

== Prize money ==
The following prize money amounts were given at the end of the tournament.

Position	Amount (thousand USD)	
Position	Per team	Total
Champions	30	30
Runners-up	20	20
Total		50

== Broadcasting rights ==
Country	Broadcaster	Ref.
Bangladesh	RTV; BTV	
Burundi	BeTV	
Mauritius	MBC1	
Palestine	Al-Quds TV	
Seychelles	StarTimes	
Sri Lanka	Dialog TV	
