= 2015 Bangabandhu Cup =

2015 Bangabandhu Gold Cup

Tournament details
- Host country: Bangladesh
- Dates: 29 January – 8 February
- Teams: 6 (from AFC confederations)
- Venues: 2

Final positions
- Champions: Malaysia (2nd title)
- Runners-up: Bangladesh

Tournament statistics
- Matches played: 9
- Goals scored: 19 (2.11 per match)
- Top scorer(s): (Malaysia) Kumaahran Sathasivam (Thailand) Pakorn Prempak (2 goals)
- Best player: (Bangladesh) Jamal Bhuyan

The 2015 Bangabandhu Cup or 2015 Bangabandhu Gold Cup is an international association football tournament organised by the Bangladesh Football Federation as a tribute to Father of the Nation Bangabandhu Sheikh Mujibur Rahman. This was the 3rd edition of the Bangabandhu Cup, after a hiatus of 16 years. It was finally given the go ahead to be played in early 2015 with six nations participating.

Bangladesh and Sri Lanka fielded senior national sides in the competition, while the others participants sent their Olympic/U-23 teams. Malaysia U-23 won the third edition, after beating Bangladesh in the final. This was also the first time the host reached the final of this tournament.

== Format ==
In the group stage, six teams were divided into two groups of three teams, playing a single round-robin, with the teams finishing first and second in each group qualifying to the semi-finals.

== Venues ==
Nine matches were played at two different venues in Dhaka and Sylhet. The Bangabandhu National Stadium in Dhaka, and Sylhet District Stadium in Sylhet. All matches were played at the following two grounds:

Dhaka	Sylhet
Bangabandhu National Stadium	Sylhet District Stadium
Capacity: 36,000	Capacity: 18,000
2015 Bangabandhu Cup is located in Bangladesh

== Officials ==
Eleven referees and 2 match commissioner were appointed by the FIFA for this tournament.

=== Referees ===
- (Bangladesh) Ferdour Ahmed
- (Bangladesh) Jalal Uddin
- (Bangladesh) Jasim Uddin
- (Bangladesh) Mijanur Rahman
- (Bangladesh) Mohammad Nuruzzaman
- (Bangladesh) Nahid
- (Bangladesh) Tayeb Shamsuzzaman
- (Chinese Taipei) Hsu Min-Yu
- (Iran) Mooud Bonyadifar
- (Qatar) Khamis Al-Marri

=== Match Commissioner ===
- (Bangladesh) Monirul Islam
- (India) Goutam Kar

== Broadcaster ==
- Channel 9
- Fox Sports 2
- Bangladesh Television

== Group stage ==
- All times are local, Bangladesh Standard Time (UTC+06:00)

=== Group A ===
Team	Pld	W	D	L	GF	GA	GD	Pts
Malaysia	2	2	0	0	3	0	+3	6
Bangladesh	2	1	0	1	1	1	0	3
Sri Lanka	2	0	0	2	0	3	−3	0

Source: BFF
29 January 2015
17:00

Bangladesh	0–1	Malaysia
		Syazwan 51'

Sylhet District Stadium, Sylhet
Attendance: 20,000

31 January 2015

Malaysia	2–0	Sri Lanka
Syahrul 45+4'; Ridzuan 60'

Sylhet District Stadium, Sylhet
Attendance: 8,000

2 February 2015

Bangladesh	1–0	Sri Lanka
Hemanta 41'

Bangabandhu National Stadium, Dhaka
Attendance: 18,000
Referee: Khamis Al-Marri (Qatar)

=== Group B ===
Team	Pld	W	D	L	GF	GA	GD	Pts
Thailand	2	2	0	0	6	2	+4	6
Singapore	2	0	1	1	2	3	−1	1
Bahrain	2	0	1	1	0	3	−3	1

Source: BFF
30 January 2015
17:00

Singapore	2–3	Thailand
Iqram 49'; Taufik 53'		Adisak 7'; Chayawat 31'; Pakorn 80'

Sylhet District Stadium, Sylhet
Attendance: 8,000

1 February 2015

Bahrain	0–0	Singapore

Bangabandhu National Stadium, Dhaka
Attendance: 800

3 February 2015

Thailand	3–0	Bahrain
Saleh 35' (o.g.); Pakorn 51' (pen.); Jaturong 56'

Bangabandhu National Stadium, Dhaka
Attendance: 1,200
Referee: Tayeb Shamsuzzaman (Bangladesh)

== Knockout stage ==
=== Bracket ===
Semi-finals
5 February – Sylhet
Singapore	0
Malaysia	1
6 February – Dhaka
Bangladesh	1
Thailand	0

Final
8 February – Dhaka
Malaysia	3
Bangladesh	2

=== Semi-finals ===
5 February 2015

Singapore	0–1	Malaysia
		Kumaahran 50'

Sylhet District Stadium, Sylhet
Attendance: 12,000

6 February 2015

Bangladesh	1–0	Thailand
Nasiruddin 38'

Bangabandhu National Stadium, Dhaka
Attendance: 36,000
Referee: Yu Ming-hsun (Chinese Taipei)

=== Final ===
8 February 2015

Bangladesh	2–3	Malaysia
Ameli 49'; Yeasin 55'		Nazirul 31'; Kumaahran 40'; Faizat 90+2'

Bangabandhu National Stadium, Dhaka
Attendance: 36,000
Referee: Yu Ming-hsun (Chinese Taipei)

== Goalscorers ==
2 goals

- (Malaysia) Kumaahran Sathasivam
- (Thailand) Pakorn Prempak

1 goal

- (Bangladesh) Jahid Hasan Ameli
- (Bangladesh) Nasiruddin Chowdhury
- (Bangladesh) Hemanta Vincent Biswas
- (Bangladesh) Yeasin Khan
- (Malaysia) Faizat Ghazli
- (Malaysia) Nazirul Naim
- (Malaysia) Ridzuan Abdunloh
- (Malaysia) Syahrul Azwari
- (Malaysia) Syazwan Andik
- (Singapore) Iqram Rifqi
- (Singapore) Taufik Suparno
- (Thailand) Adisak Sansomiad
- (Thailand) Chayawat Srinawong
- (Thailand) Jaturong Pimkoon

Own goal

- (Bahrain) Saleh
