= Sameh Maraaba =

Palestinian footballer

Personal information
- Full name: Sameh Maraaba
- Date of birth: 19 March 1992 (age 34)
- Place of birth: Qalqilya, Palestine
- Height: 1.80 m (5 ft 11 in)
- Position: Forward

Youth career
- 2010–2012: Jabal Al-Mukaber

Senior career*
Years	Team	Apps	(Gls)
2012	Jabal Al-Mukaber		(7)
2012–2014	Hilal Al-Quds		(6)
2014–2015	Islami Qalqilya		(11)
2015	Shabab Yatta		
2015–2016	Shabab Al-Khader	17	(17)
2016–2017	Thaqafi Tulkarem		(11)
2017–2018	Ahli Al-Khaleel		(9)
2018–2019	Shabab Al-Khalil		(5)
2019–2021	Markaz Shabab Al-Am'ari	19	(10)
2021–2022	Islami Qalqilya	13	(7)
2022–2023	Hilal Al-Quds	20	(21)
2024	Jabal Al-Mukaber	2	(4)
2024	Al Khalij		
2024–2025	Al-Sareeh	10	(0)

International career^{‡}
2015–2023	Palestine	49	(12)
- * Club domestic league appearances and goals ‡ National team caps and goals as of 11 September 2024

Sameh Maraaba (born 19 March 1992) is a Palestinian footballer who plays as a forward. He is currently a free agent.

== Career ==
Maraaba made his professional international debut for Palestine in 2015 during Second round World Cup qualifying for the 2018 FIFA World Cup against Saudi Arabia. The very next game, against Malaysia he scored twice, in Palestine's 6–0 surprise routing.

=== International goals ===
Scores and results list Palestine's goal tally first.

No.	Date	Venue	Opponent	Score	Result	Competition
1.	16 May 2015	Bukit Jalil National Stadium, Kuala Lumpur, Malaysia	Malaysia	2–0	6–0	2018 FIFA World Cup qualification
2.	16 May 2015	Bukit Jalil National Stadium, Kuala Lumpur, Malaysia	Malaysia	4–0	6–0	2018 FIFA World Cup qualification
3.	7 June 2017	Bahrain National Stadium, Riffa, Bahrain	Bahrain	1–0	2–0	Friendly
4.	10 October 2017	Dora International Stadium, Hebron, Palestine	Bhutan	4–0	10–0	2019 AFC Asian Cup qualification
5.	14 November 2017	Arab American University Stadium, Jenin, Palestine	Maldives	3–0	8–1	2019 AFC Asian Cup qualification
6.	14 November 2017	Arab American University Stadium, Jenin, Palestine	Maldives	5–1	8–1	2019 AFC Asian Cup qualification
7.	14 November 2017	Arab American University Stadium, Jenin, Palestine	Maldives	6–1	8–1	2019 AFC Asian Cup qualification
8.	14 November 2017	Arab American University Stadium, Jenin, Palestine	Maldives	8–1	8–1	2019 AFC Asian Cup qualification
9.	10 October 2018	Cox's Bazar Stadium, Cox's Bazar, Bangladesh	Bangladesh	2–0	2–0	2018 Bangabandhu Cup
10.	16 December 2018	Grand Hamad Stadium, Doha, Qatar	Pakistan	2–0	2–0	Friendly
11.	25 January 2020	Bangabandhu National Stadium, Dhaka, Bangladesh	Burundi	2–0	3–1	2020 Bangabandhu Cup
12.	18 January 2021	Jaber Al-Ahmad International Stadium, Kuwait City, Kuwait	Kuwait	1–0	1–0	Friendly

== Personal life ==
Maraaba would have made his debut for Palestine a lot earlier, however he was embroiled within the political turmoil that surrounds Palestine as a nation. Maraaba was arrested by the Israeli Defence Force on 28 April 2014 at the border crossing between Jordan and the West Bank as he returned from a training camp in Qatar. A spokesman for the Israeli Ministry of Foreign Affairs claimed they had "concrete information that he was carrying, or was involved in the potential transfer of communication equipment and finance on behalf of Hamas". Maraaba denied the claims, with the Palestinian Football Association claiming that he had been "carrying money back to his football club which had been given to him by an ex-colleague of the club who had previously been jailed by Israel as a member of Hamas". As a result, Maraaba was detained for a period of 7 months, resulting in him missing Palestine's 2014 AFC Challenge Cup campaign (in which Palestine would ultimately win, qualifying for the 2015 AFC Asian Cup in the process), the 2014 Asian Games (in which Palestine made the Round of 16), and the 2015 AFC Asian Cup in Australia.
