= Bangabandhu Cup =

International football tournament

- Organiser(s): Bangladesh Football Federation
- Founded: 1996; 30 years ago
- Abolished: 2022; 4 years ago
- Region: International
- Teams: 8 (final stage)
- Last champions: Palestine (2nd title)
- Most championships: Palestine; Malaysia (2 titles)

The Bangabandhu Cup, also known as the Bangabandhu Gold Cup, was an international football tournament organised by the Bangladesh Football Federation (BFF) as a tribute to Bangabandhu Sheikh Mujibur Rahman who is the founding father of Bangladesh. It has been played sporadically since 1996, and was resurrected in 2015.

Up to the 2016 edition, most of the participating countries in the tournament sent their youth national teams, their second teams or club sides. In the 2018 edition, all participating nations sent their first team except the Philippines.

Palestine is the champion, after defeating Tajikistan in the 2018 tournament and defended its trophy against Burundi in 2020.

== Results ==
Year	Final		
Year	Champions	Score	Runners–up
1996–97; Details	Malaysia	2–1	(Indonesia); PSM Makassar
1999; Details	Japan	3–2	Ghana
2015; Details	Malaysia	3–2	Bangladesh
2016; Details	Nepal	3–0	Bahrain
2018; Details	Palestine	0–0 (a.e.t.) (4–3 PSO)	Tajikistan
2020; Details	Palestine	3–1	Burundi

== Tournament summary ==
Team	Champions	Runners–up
Malaysia U-23	2 (1996/97, 2015)	0
Palestine	2 (2018, 2020)	0
Nepal	1 (2016)	0
Japan	1 (1999)	0
Tajikistan	0	1 (2018)
Bahrain U-23	0	1 (2016)
Bangladesh	0	1 (2015)
Ghana U-23	0	1 (1999)
(Indonesia) PSM Makassar	0	1 (1996–97)
Burundi	0	1 (2020)

== Top goalscorers ==
=== Top goalscorers by edition ===
Years	Player(s)	Goals
1996–97	(Indonesia) Izaak Fatari (Sierra Leone) Musa Kallon	–
1999	(South Korea) Lee Chun-soo	7
2015	(Malaysia) Kumaahran Sathasivam (Thailand) Pakorn Prempak	2
2016	(Nepal) Nawayug Shrestha	4
2018	(Tajikistan) Komron Tursunov	2
2020	(Burundi) Jospin Nshimirimana	7

== Venues ==
- Bangabandhu National Stadium
- Sylhet District Stadium
- Bangladesh Army Stadium
- M. A. Aziz Stadium
- Cox's Bazar Stadium
