= Sylhet District Stadium =

Multipurpose stadium in Sylhet, Bangladesh

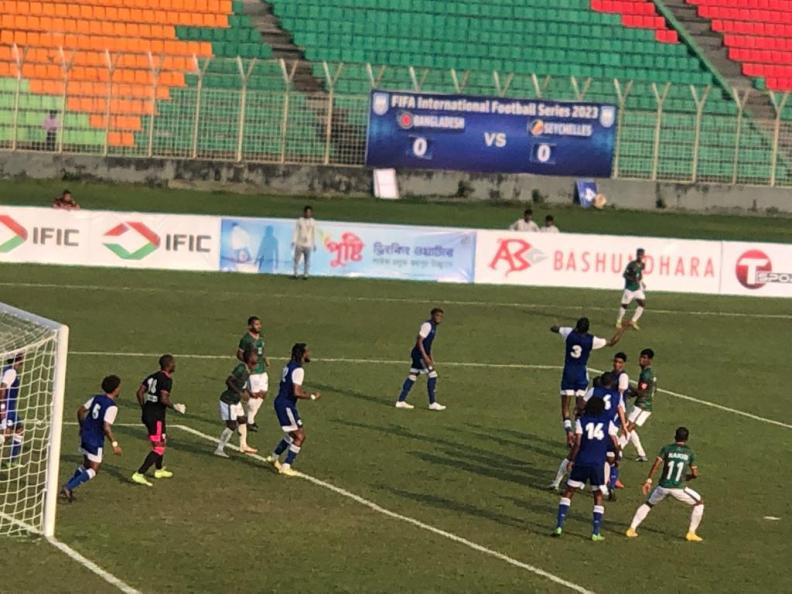
- Interactive map of Sylhet District Stadium
- Location: Sylhet, Bangladesh
- Coordinates: 24°53′53.46″N 91°51′48.96″E
- Owner: National Sports Council
- Operator: National Sports Council
- Capacity: 15,000
- Surface: Grass
- Field size: 145 m x 135 m
- Current use: Football (mostly); Cricket

Construction
- Built: 1965
- Renovated: 2018

Tenants
- Bangladesh national football team Sylhet District

Sylhet District Stadium (Bengali: সিলেট জেলা স্টেডিয়াম) is a stadium mostly used for football matches. It is located in Rikabi Bazar, Sylhet, Bangladesh with a capacity of 15,000. This stadium is also used for international football matches.

== History ==
In September 2011, the stadium hosted a friendly football match between the Under-23 teams of Bangladesh and Nepal as part of their preparations for the 2014 Asian Games. During the event, over 50,000 spectators forcefully entered the stadium premises by breaking through the main entrance.

The stadium also hosted the 2015 SAFF U-16 Championship where Bangladesh clinched the title and some matches of the 2015 Bangabandhu Cup.

A renovation lasting nearly half a month, which began on September 20, was carried out on the stadium for the 2018 Bangabandhu Cup. The gallery was repainted, the dressing rooms were upgraded, and digital boards were installed. Additionally, 190 new bulbs were added to the four floodlight stands, each of which previously had 400 bulbs.

== International football ==
=== Friendlies ===
Date	Competition	Team	Result	Team	Attendance
29 August 2014	International friendly	Bangladesh U23	0–1	Nepal U23	50,000
29 March 2022	International friendly	Bangladesh	0–0	Mongolia	10,000
25 March 2023	International friendly	Bangladesh	1–0	Seychelles	1,679
28 March 2023	International friendly	Bangladesh	0–1	Seychelles	1,040

=== 2015 Bangabandhu Cup ===
Date	Competition	Team	Result	Team	Attendance
29 January 2015	2015 Bangabandhu Cup	Bangladesh	0–2	Malaysia U23	20,000
31 January 2015	2015 Bangabandhu Cup	Malaysia U23	0–2	Sri Lanka	8,000
30 January 2015	2015 Bangabandhu Cup	Singapore U23	1–0	Thailand U23	8,000
5 February 2015	2015 Bangabandhu Cup	Singapore U23	0–1	Malaysia U23	12,000

=== 2018 Bangabandhu Cup ===
Date	Competition	Team	Result	Team	Attendance
2 October 2018	2018 Bangabandhu Cup	Nepal	0–2	Tajikistan	6,000
4 October 2018	2018 Bangabandhu Cup	Tajikistan	0–2	Palestine	N/A
6 October 2018	2018 Bangabandhu Cup	Palestine	1–0	Nepal	N/A
1 October 2018	2018 Bangabandhu Cup	Bangladesh	1–0	Laos	N/A
3 October 2018	2018 Bangabandhu Cup	Philippines	3–1	Laos	N/A
5 October 2018	2018 Bangabandhu Cup	Bangladesh	0–1	Philippines	N/A

== See also ==
- List of football stadiums in Bangladesh
- List of stadiums in Bangladesh
