= 2014 AFC Challenge Cup squads =

Below are the squads for the 2014 AFC Challenge Cup in Maldives, which took place between 19 and 30 May 2014. The players' listed age is their age on the tournament's opening day

== Group A ==
=== Maldives ===
Coach: (Croatia) Drago Mamić

| No. | Pos. | Player | Date of birth (age) | Club |
|---|---|---|---|---|
| 1 | GK | Mohamed Imran | 18 December 1980 (aged 33) | (Football Association of Maldives) Maziya |
| 2 | DF | Ahmed Numan | 8 January 1992 (aged 22) | (Football Association of Maldives) Club Eagles |
| 3 | DF | Mohamed Shifan | 8 March 1983 (aged 31) | (Football Association of Maldives) New Radiant |
| 4 | DF | Ahmed Abdulla | 11 March 1987 (aged 27) | (Football Association of Maldives) New Radiant |
| 5 | MF | Ibrahim Fazeel | 9 October 1980 (aged 33) | (Football Association of Maldives) New Radiant |
| 6 | MF | Mohamed Arif | 11 August 1985 (aged 28) | (Football Association of Maldives) Maziya |
| 7 | FW | Ali Ashfaq (c) | 5 September 1985 (aged 28) | (Football Association of Malaysia) PDRM FA |
| 8 | MF | Shamweel Qasim | 20 June 1982 (aged 31) | (Football Association of Maldives) New Radiant |
| 9 | FW | Assadhulla Abdulla | 19 February 1990 (aged 24) | (Football Association of Maldives) Maziya |
| 10 | MF | Mohamed Umair | 3 July 1988 (aged 25) | (Football Association of Maldives) New Radiant |
| 11 | MF | Ali Fasir | 4 September 1988 (aged 25) | (Football Association of Maldives) New Radiant |
| 12 | MF | Ashad Ali | 14 September 1985 (aged 28) | (Football Association of Maldives) Maziya |
| 13 | DF | Akram Abdul Ghanee | 19 March 1987 (aged 27) | (Football Association of Maldives) New Radiant |
| 14 | MF | Ahmed Mohamed | 8 July 1988 (aged 25) | (Football Association of Maldives) Maziya |
| 15 | DF | Amdhan Ali | 11 September 1992 (aged 21) | (Football Association of Maldives) Maziya |
| 16 | FW | Hussain Niyaz Mohamed | 19 March 1987 (aged 27) | (Football Association of Maldives) Mahibadhoo |
| 17 | DF | Shafiu Ahmed | 13 November 1988 (aged 25) | (Football Association of Maldives) New Radiant |
| 18 | GK | Ibrahim Ifrah Areef | 8 June 1989 (aged 24) | (Football Association of Maldives) Club Valencia |
| 19 | DF | Mohamed Rasheed | 15 April 1985 (aged 29) | (Football Association of Maldives) New Radiant |
| 20 | FW | Ahmed Nashid | 4 April 1989 (aged 25) | (Football Association of Maldives) Maziya |
| 21 | MF | Hassan Adhuham | 8 January 1990 (aged 24) | (Football Association of Maldives) Club Eagles |
| 22 | GK | Imran Mohamed | 25 May 1988 (aged 25) | (Football Association of Maldives) New Radiant |
| 23 | DF | Rilwan Waheed | 14 February 1991 (aged 23) | (Football Association of Maldives) Maziya |

=== Palestine ===
Coach: (Jordan) Jamal Mahmoud

| No. | Pos. | Player | Date of birth (age) | Club |
|---|---|---|---|---|
| 1 | GK | Tawfiq Ali | 8 November 1990 (aged 23) | (Palestinian Football Association) Taraji Wadi Al-Nes |
| 2 | DF | Raed Fares | 6 December 1982 (aged 31) | (Palestinian Football Association) Hilal Al-Quds |
| 3 | DF | Hussam Abu Saleh | 14 February 1983 (aged 31) | (Palestinian Football Association) Hilal Al-Quds |
| 5 | DF | Omar Jarun | 10 December 1983 (aged 30) | (Canadian Soccer Association) Ottawa Fury |
| 6 | DF | Mousa Abu Jazar | 28 August 1987 (aged 26) | (Palestinian Football Association) Shabab Al-Khaleel |
| 7 | FW | Ashraf Nu'man | 29 July 1986 (aged 27) | (Palestinian Football Association) Taraji Wadi Al-Nes |
| 8 | MF | Hilal Musa | 31 May 1990 (aged 23) | (Palestinian Football Association) Shabab Al-Khader |
| 9 | FW | Tamer Seyam | 25 November 1992 (aged 21) | (Palestinian Football Association) Shabab Al-Khaleel |
| 10 | FW | Imad Zatara | 1 October 1984 (aged 29) | (Swedish Football Association) Åtvidabergs FF |
| 11 | FW | Ahmad Maher Wridat | 22 July 1991 (aged 22) | (Palestinian Football Association) Shabab Al-Dhahiriya |
| 13 | DF | Khaled Mahdi | 1 February 1987 (aged 27) | (Palestinian Football Association) Markaz Shabab Al-Am'ari |
| 14 | MF | Abdallah Jaber | 17 February 1993 (aged 21) | (Palestinian Football Association) Hilal Al-Quds |
| 15 | DF | Abdelatif Bahdari | 20 February 1984 (aged 30) | (Iraq Football Association) Zakho |
| 16 | DF | Haytham Theeb | 3 December 1986 (aged 27) | (Palestinian Football Association) Hilal Al-Quds |
| 17 | FW | Rami Musalmeh | 12 November 1991 (aged 22) | (Palestinian Football Association) Shabab Al-Khader |
| 18 | DF | Musab Al-Battat | 12 November 1993 (aged 20) | (Palestinian Football Association) Shabab Al-Dhahiriya |
| 19 | MF | Abdelhamid Abuhabib | 8 June 1989 (aged 24) | (Palestinian Football Association) Shabab Al-Khaleel |
| 20 | MF | Khader Yousef | 6 October 1984 (aged 29) | (Palestinian Football Association) Taraji Wadi Al-Nes |
| 21 | GK | Ramzi Saleh (c) | 8 August 1980 (aged 33) | (Egyptian Football Association) Misr El-Makasa |
| 22 | GK | Ghanem Mahajneh | 20 April 1991 (aged 23) | (Palestinian Football Association) Taraji Wadi Al-Nes |
| 23 | MF | Murad Ismail Said | 15 December 1982 (aged 31) | (Jordan Football Association) Al-Wehdat |

=== Kyrgyzstan ===
Coach: (Russia) Sergey Dvoryankov

| No. | Pos. | Player | Date of birth (age) | Club |
|---|---|---|---|---|
| 1 | GK | Pavel Matiash | 11 July 1987 (aged 26) | (Kyrgyz Football Union) Dordoi Bishkek |
| 2 | DF | Valerii Kichin | 12 October 1992 (aged 21) | (Russian Football Union) Ufa |
| 3 | DF | Tahir Avchiev | 15 November 1987 (aged 26) | (Kyrgyz Football Union) Abdish-Ata Kant |
| 4 | MF | Azamat Baymatov | 3 December 1988 (age 37) | (Kyrgyz Football Union) Dordoi Bishkek |
| 5 | DF | Vladimir Kasyan | 5 March 1988 (aged 26) | (Kyrgyz Football Union) Abdish-Ata Kant |
| 6 | DF | Sherzod Shakirov | 18 November 1990 (aged 23) | (Kyrgyz Football Union) Alay Osh |
| 7 | MF | Anatoliy Vlasichev | 14 June 1988 (aged 25) | (Kazakhstan Football Federation) Okzhetpes |
| 8 | DF | Elijah Ari | 6 November 1987 (aged 26) | (Tajikistan Football Federation) Regar-TadAZ Tursunzoda |
| 9 | FW | Ildar Amirov | 9 October 1987 (aged 26) | (Kyrgyz Football Union) Alay Osh |
| 10 | FW | Vladimir Verevkin | 8 May 1987 (aged 27) | (Kyrgyz Football Union) Aldiyer Kurshab |
| 11 | MF | Claude Maka Kum | 16 May 1985 (aged 29) | (Oman Football Association) Saham |
| 12 | GK | Vladislav Volkov | 15 August 1980 (aged 33) | (Kyrgyz Football Union) Dordoi Bishkek |
| 13 | DF | Davron Askarov | 6 January 1988 (aged 26) | (Kyrgyz Football Union) Dordoi Bishkek |
| 14 | MF | Kairat Zhyrgalbek Uulu | 13 June 1994 (aged 19) | (Kyrgyz Football Union) Abdish-Ata Kant |
| 15 | MF | Abror Kydyraliev | 5 April 1992 (aged 22) | (Kyrgyz Football Union) Aldiyer Kurshab |
| 16 | GK | Valery Kashuba | 14 September 1984 (aged 29) | (Kyrgyz Football Union) Alay Osh |
| 17 | DF | Daniel Tagoe | 3 March 1986 (aged 28) | (Kyrgyz Football Union) Dordoi Bishkek |
| 18 | MF | Vadim Kharchenko (c) | 29 May 1984 (aged 29) | (Turkish Football Federation) Tavşanlı Linyitspor |
| 19 | MF | Aziz Sydykov | 23 June 1992 (aged 21) | (Kyrgyz Football Union) Abdish-Ata Kant |
| 20 | FW | David Tetteh | 10 August 1985 (aged 28) | (Kyrgyz Football Union) Dordoi Bishkek |
| 21 | MF | Akhlidin Israilov | 16 September 1994 (aged 19) | (Ukrainian Association of Football) Dynamo-2 Kyiv |
| 22 | MF | Hurshil Lutfullaev | 8 January 1983 (aged 31) | (Kyrgyz Football Union) Abdish-Ata Kant |
| 23 | DF | Artur Muladjanov | 5 July 1989 (aged 24) | (Kyrgyz Football Union) Alga Bishkek |

=== Myanmar ===
Coach: (Serbia) Radojko Avramović

| No. | Pos. | Player | Date of birth (age) | Club |
|---|---|---|---|---|
| 1 | GK | Thiha Sithu | 3 July 1988 (aged 25) | (Myanmar Football Federation) Yadanarbon |
| 2 | DF | Aung Zaw | 5 March 1990 (aged 24) | (Myanmar Football Federation) Yangon United |
| 3 | DF | Zaw Min Tun | 20 May 1992 (aged 21) | (Myanmar Football Federation) Yadanarbon |
| 4 | DF | David Htan | 13 May 1990 (aged 24) | (Myanmar Football Federation) Yangon United |
| 5 | DF | Khin Maung Lwin | 27 December 1988 (aged 25) | (Myanmar Football Federation) Yangon United |
| 6 | MF | Yan Aung Kyaw | 4 August 1989 (aged 24) | (Myanmar Football Federation) Yangon United |
| 7 | MF | Ya Zar Win Thein | 9 April 1988 (aged 26) | (Myanmar Football Federation) Yangon United |
| 8 | MF | Min Min Thu | 30 March 1988 (aged 26) | (Myanmar Football Federation) Ayeyawady United |
| 9 | FW | Yan Paing (c) | 27 November 1983 (aged 30) | (Myanmar Football Federation) Yadanarbon |
| 10 | FW | Kyaw Ko Ko | 20 December 1992 (aged 21) | (Myanmar Football Federation) Yangon United |
| 11 | DF | Pyae Phyo Aung | 19 September 1987 (aged 26) | (Myanmar Football Federation) Yangon United |
| 12 | MF | Sithu Aung | 16 October 1996 (aged 17) | (Myanmar Football Federation) Yangon United |
| 13 | FW | Kaung Sithu | 22 January 1993 (aged 21) | (Myanmar Football Federation) Yadanarbon |
| 14 | DF | Ye Win Aung | 6 August 1993 (aged 20) | (Myanmar Football Federation) Yadanarbon |
| 15 | DF | Aung Hein Kyaw | 19 July 1991 (aged 22) | (Myanmar Football Federation) Zeyar Shwe Myay |
| 16 | DF | Thein Zaw | 28 May 1993 (aged 20) | (Myanmar Football Federation) Zwekapin United |
| 17 | DF | Yan Aung Win | 9 September 1992 (aged 21) | (Myanmar Football Federation) Yadanarbon |
| 18 | GK | Kyaw Zin Phyo | 1 February 1994 (aged 20) | (Myanmar Football Federation) Magway |
| 19 | DF | Aung Thike | 5 April 1988 (aged 26) | (Myanmar Football Federation) Yangon United |
| 20 | MF | Kyaw Min Oo | 16 June 1996 (aged 17) | (Myanmar Football Federation) Ayeyawady United |
| 21 | MF | Nyein Chan Aung | 18 August 1996 (aged 17) | (Myanmar Football Federation) Manaw Myay |
| 22 | FW | Chit Su Moe | 4 December 1994 (aged 19) | (Myanmar Football Federation) Chin United |
| 23 | GK | Vanlal Hruai | 25 May 1991 (aged 22) | (Myanmar Football Federation) Nay Pyi Taw |

== Group B ==
=== Turkmenistan ===
Coach: (Turkmenistan) Rahym Gurbanmämmedow

| No. | Pos. | Player | Date of birth (age) | Club |
|---|---|---|---|---|
| 1 | GK | Maksatmyrat Şamyradow | 6 May 1984 (aged 30) | (Uzbekistan Football Association) Olmaliq FK |
| 2 | DF | Ýagmyrmyrat Annamyradow | 19 October 1982 (aged 31) | (Football Federation of Turkmenistan) Balkan |
| 3 | DF | Şöhrat Söýünow | 8 March 1992 (aged 22) | (Football Federation of Turkmenistan) HTTU |
| 4 | DF | Akmyrat Jumanazarow | 5 November 1987 (aged 26) | (Football Federation of Turkmenistan) HTTU |
| 5 | DF | Mekan Saparow | 22 April 1994 (aged 20) | (Football Federation of Turkmenistan) Balkan |
| 6 | MF | Serdar Geldiýew | 1 October 1987 (aged 26) | (Football Federation of Turkmenistan) Ahal |
| 7 | DF | Serdar Annaorazow | 29 June 1990 (aged 23) | (Football Federation of Turkmenistan) HTTU |
| 8 | FW | Bahtiýar Hojaahmedow | 14 February 1985 (aged 29) | (Football Federation of Turkmenistan) Altyn Asyr |
| 9 | FW | Süleýman Muhadow | 24 December 1993 (aged 20) | (Football Federation of Turkmenistan) HTTU |
| 10 | FW | Guwanç Abylow | 30 March 1988 (aged 26) | (Football Federation of Turkmenistan) Altyn Asyr |
| 11 | MF | Didar Durdyýew | 16 July 1993 (aged 20) | (Football Federation of Turkmenistan) Altyn Asyr |
| 12 | MF | Amir Gurbani | 24 October 1987 (aged 26) | (Football Federation of Turkmenistan) Ahal |
| 13 | MF | Döwlet Baýramow | 8 August 1982 (aged 31) | (Football Federation of Turkmenistan) Şagadam |
| 14 | MF | Ruslan Mingazow | 23 November 1991 (aged 22) | (Latvian Football Federation) Skonto Riga |
| 15 | DF | Myrat Hamraýew | 14 May 1983 (aged 31) | (Football Federation of Turkmenistan) Balkan |
| 16 | GK | Nikita Gorbunow (c) | 14 February 1984 (aged 30) | (Football Federation of Turkmenistan) Balkan |
| 17 | MF | Umidjan Astanow | 11 August 1990 (aged 23) | (Football Federation of Turkmenistan) Balkan |
| 18 | FW | Farhad Italmazow | 19 April 1993 (aged 21) | (Football Federation of Turkmenistan) Ahal |
| 19 | DF | Ahmet Ataýew | 19 September 1990 (aged 23) | (Football Federation of Turkmenistan) Altyn Asyr |
| 20 | MF | Ilýa Tamurkin | 9 May 1989 (aged 25) | (Football Federation of Turkmenistan) Merw FT |
| 21 | DF | Ata Geldiýew | 27 January 1990 (aged 24) | (Football Federation of Turkmenistan) Ahal |
| 22 | FW | Aleksandr Boliýan | 27 July 1989 (aged 24) | (Football Federation of Turkmenistan) Şagadam |
| 23 | GK | Farhat Bazarow | 31 January 1980 (aged 34) | (Football Federation of Turkmenistan) Balkan |

=== Philippines ===
Coach: (United States) Thomas Dooley

| No. | Pos. | Player | Date of birth (age) | Club |
|---|---|---|---|---|
| 1 | GK | Neil Etheridge | 7 February 1990 (aged 24) | (The Football Association) Fulham |
| 2 | DF | Rob Gier (c) | 6 January 1981 (aged 33) | (The Football Association) Ascot United |
| 3 | DF | Daisuke Sato | 20 September 1994 (aged 19) | (Philippine Football Federation) Global |
| 4 | DF | Anton del Rosario | 23 December 1981 (aged 32) | (Philippine Football Federation) Kaya |
| 5 | DF | Juan Luis Guirado | 27 August 1979 (aged 34) | (Royal Spanish Football Federation) Burgos |
| 6 | MF | Jason de Jong | 28 February 1990 (aged 24) | (Philippine Football Federation) Global |
| 7 | MF | James Younghusband | 4 September 1986 (aged 27) | (Philippine Football Federation) Loyola Meralco Sparks |
| 8 | DF | Dennis Cagara | 19 February 1985 (aged 29) | (Danish Football Association) Lyngby |
| 9 | FW | Kenshiro Daniels | 12 January 1995 (aged 19) | (Philippine Football Federation) Kaya |
| 10 | FW | Phil Younghusband | 4 August 1987 (aged 26) | (Philippine Football Federation) Loyola Meralco Sparks |
| 11 | MF | Patrick Reichelt | 15 June 1988 (aged 25) | (Philippine Football Federation) Ceres |
| 12 | DF | Amani Aguinaldo | 24 April 1995 (aged 19) | (Philippine Football Federation) Global |
| 13 | FW | Ruben Doctora | 17 April 1986 (aged 28) | (Philippine Football Federation) Stallion |
| 14 | DF | Simon Greatwich | 30 September 1988 (aged 25) | (Philippine Football Federation) Loyola Meralco Sparks |
| 15 | GK | Roland Müller | 2 March 1988 (aged 26) | (Swiss Football Association) Servette FC |
| 16 | GK | Patrick Deyto | 15 February 1990 (aged 24) | (Philippine Football Federation) Green Archers United |
| 17 | MF | Stephan Schröck | 21 August 1986 (aged 27) | (German Football Association) Eintracht Frankfurt |
| 18 | MF | Chris Greatwich | 30 September 1983 (aged 30) | (Philippine Football Federation) Kaya |
| 19 | MF | Jerry Lucena | 11 August 1980 (aged 33) | (Danish Football Association) Esbjerg |
| 20 | MF | OJ Porteria | 9 May 1994 (aged 20) | (Philippine Football Federation) Kaya |
| 21 | MF | Martin Steuble | 9 June 1988 (aged 25) | (Swiss Football Association) Wil |
| 22 | MF | Paul Mulders | 16 January 1981 (aged 33) | (Royal Dutch Football Association) SC Cambuur |
| 23 | DF | Simone Rota | 6 November 1984 (aged 29) | (Philippine Football Federation) Stallion |

=== Afghanistan ===
Coach: (Germany) Erich Rutemöller

| No. | Pos. | Player | Date of birth (age) | Club |
|---|---|---|---|---|
| 1 | GK | Mansur Faqiryar | 3 January 1986 (aged 28) | (German Football Association) VfB Oldenburg |
| 2 | DF | Abassin Alikhil | 19 April 1991 (aged 23) | (German Football Association) FSV Frankfurt II |
| 3 | DF | Zohib Islam Amiri (c) | 2 May 1987 (aged 27) | (All India Football Federation) Dempo |
| 4 | DF | Faisal Sakhizada | 15 July 1990 (aged 23) | (Football Australia) Dandenong Thunder SC |
| 5 | DF | Zamir Daudi | 5 August 1987 (aged 26) | (German Football Association) TGM SV Jügesheim |
| 6 | MF | Mohammad Rafi Barekzay | 6 June 1990 (aged 23) | (Afghanistan Football Federation) Toofan Harirod |
| 7 | MF | Mustafa Azadzoy | 24 July 1992 (aged 21) | (German Football Association) TB Uphusen |
| 8 | MF | Faysal Shayesteh | 21 June 1991 (aged 22) | (Football Association of Thailand) Songkhla United |
| 9 | FW | Balal Arezou | 28 December 1988 (aged 25) | (Norwegian Football Federation) Asker Fotball |
| 10 | MF | Mohammad Mashriqi | 7 July 1987 (aged 26) | (All India Football Federation) Bhawanipore |
| 11 | FW | Sandjar Ahmadi | 10 February 1992 (aged 22) | (German Football Association) TuS Dassendorf |
| 12 | FW | Hashmatullah Barakzai | 26 August 1987 (aged 26) | (All India Football Federation) Mumbai |
| 13 | FW | Hamidullah Karimi | 6 February 1992 (aged 22) | (Afghanistan Football Federation) Toofaan Harirod |
| 14 | DF | Farzad Ataee | 30 December 1991 (aged 22) | (Afghanistan Football Federation) Toofaan Harirod |
| 15 | DF | Hassan Amin | 10 November 1991 (aged 22) | (German Football Association) Eintracht Frankfurt II |
| 16 | DF | Djelaludin Sharityar | 15 March 1983 (aged 31) | (German Football Association) 1. FC Schweinfurt 05 |
| 17 | MF | Mustafa Zazai | 9 May 1993 (aged 21) | (German Football Association) FC St. Pauli II |
| 18 | MF | Ahmad Hatifi | 13 March 1986 (aged 28) | (All India Football Federation) Mumbai |
| 19 | MF | Amredin Sharifi | 2 June 1992 (aged 21) | (Afghanistan Football Federation) Shaheen Asmayee |
| 20 | DF | Mustafa Hadid | 25 August 1988 (aged 25) | (German Football Association) Altona 93 |
| 21 | DF | Mujtaba Faiz | 7 March 1982 (aged 32) | (Afghanistan Football Federation) Shaheen Asmayee |
| 22 | GK | Hamidullah Yousafzai | 2 December 1981 (aged 32) | (Afghanistan Football Federation) Shaheen Asmayee |
| 23 | GK | Safiullah Barekzai | unknown | (Afghanistan Football Federation) Oqaban Hindukush |

=== Laos ===
Coach: (Japan) Norio Tsukitate

| No. | Pos. | Player | Date of birth (age) | Club |
|---|---|---|---|---|
| 1 | GK | Vathana Keodouangdeth | 28 January 1996 (aged 18) | (Lao Football Federation) Lao Toyota |
| 2 | DF | Saynakhonevieng Phommapanya | 28 October 1988 (aged 25) | (Lao Football Federation) Lao Toyota |
| 3 | DF | Khamphoumy Hanvilay | 2 December 1990 (aged 23) | (Lao Football Federation) Hoàng Anh Attapeu |
| 4 | DF | Ketsada Souksavanh (c) | 23 November 1992 (aged 21) | (Football Association of Thailand) Thai Honda |
| 5 | MF | Viengsavanh Sayyaboun | 3 June 1989 (aged 24) | (Lao Football Federation) Lao Army |
| 6 | DF | Saychon Khunsamnam | 13 January 1993 (aged 21) | (Lao Football Federation) Lao Police Club |
| 7 | MF | Khonesavanh Sihavong | 10 October 1994 (aged 19) | (Lao Football Federation) Lao Police Club |
| 8 | MF | Phoutthasay Khochalern | 29 December 1995 (aged 18) | (Lao Football Federation) Ezra |
| 9 | FW | Sopha Saysana | 9 December 1992 (aged 21) | (Football Association of Thailand) Nong Khai |
| 10 | MF | Soukaphone Vongchiengkham | 9 March 1992 (aged 22) | (Football Association of Thailand) Phitsanulok |
| 11 | MF | Lembo Saysana | 12 February 1995 (aged 19) | (Football Association of Thailand) Nong Khai |
| 12 | MF | Phoutdavy Phommasane | 2 February 1994 (aged 20) | (Lao Football Federation) Hoàng Anh Attapeu |
| 13 | DF | Bounthavy Sipasong | 4 June 1996 (aged 17) | (Lao Football Federation) Hoàng Anh Attapeu |
| 14 | MF | Anousay Noyvong | 3 May 1996 (aged 18) | unknown |
| 15 | DF | Chuefong Xiong | 21 April 1992 (aged 22) | (Lao Football Federation) Vientiane |
| 16 | DF | Khamla Pinkeo | 23 November 1990 (aged 23) | (Lao Football Federation) Lao Police Club |
| 17 | MF | Vilayout Sayyabounsou | 27 November 1992 (aged 21) | (Lao Football Federation) Ezra |
| 18 | GK | Seng Athit Somvang | 2 June 1991 (aged 22) | (Lao Football Federation) Lao Police Club |
| 19 | DF | Sengdao Inthilath | 3 June 1994 (aged 19) | (Lao Football Federation) Yotha |
| 20 | FW | Khampheng Sayavutthi | 19 July 1986 (aged 27) | (Football Association of Thailand) Ang Thong |
| 21 | MF | Tiny Bounmalay | 6 June 1993 (aged 20) | (Lao Football Federation) Lao Police Club |
| 22 | DF | Sousadakone Liepvisay | 15 January 1993 (aged 21) | unknown |
| 23 | GK | Sengphachan Bounthisanh | 1 June 1987 (aged 26) | (Lao Football Federation) SHB Champasak |
