= 2014 AFC Challenge Cup final =

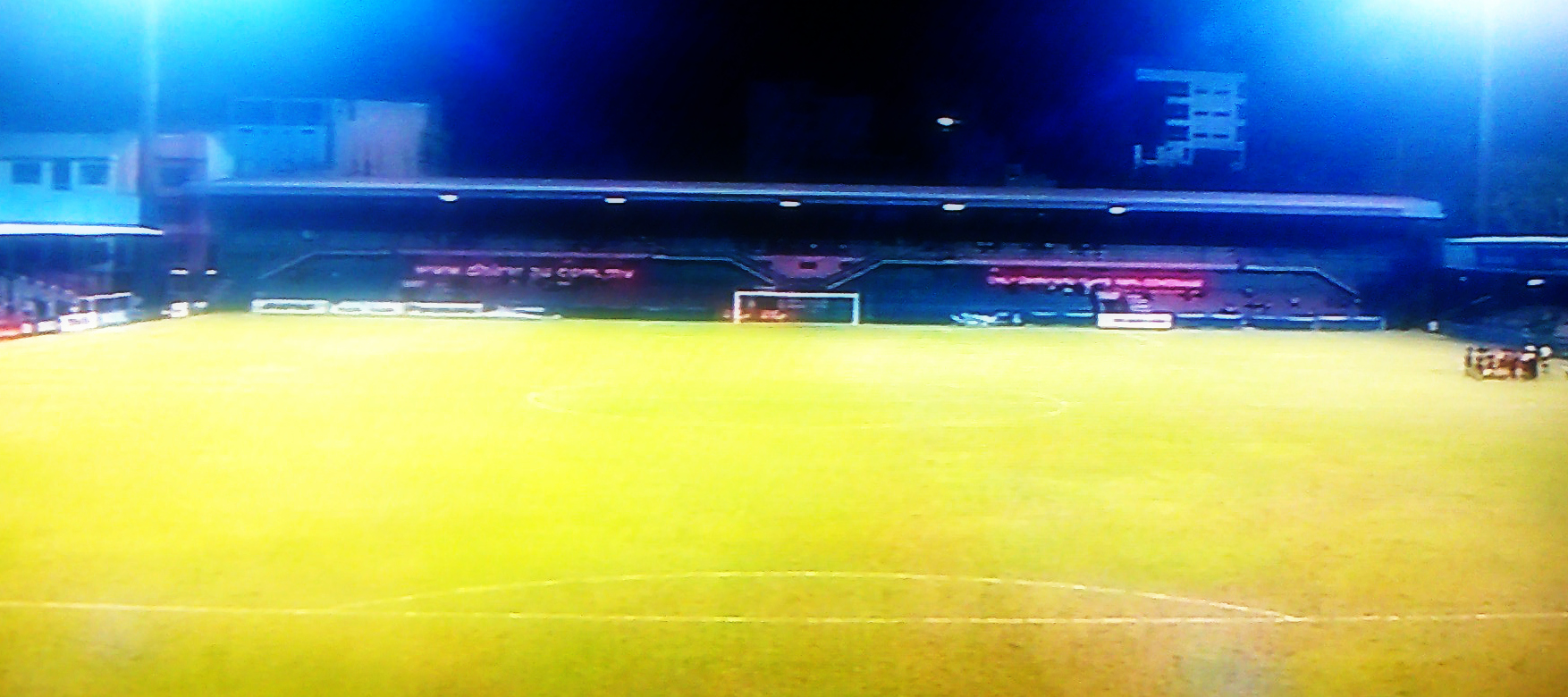
- The National Football Stadium where it was held.
- Event: 2014 AFC Challenge Cup
Palestine	Philippines
(Palestine)	(Philippines)
1	0
- Date: 30 May 2014
- Venue: National Football Stadium, Malé
- Referee: Valentin Kovalenko (Uzbekistan)
- Attendance: 6,500
- Weather: Cloudy; 28 °C (82 °F)

The 2014 AFC Challenge Cup final was an association football match between Palestine and the Philippines on 30 May 2014 at the National Football Stadium in Malé, Maldives.

== Background ==
The AFC Challenge Cup was an international football competition for Asian Football Confederation (AFC) nations that was categorized as "emerging countries" in the "Vision Asia" program. It was an idea by former AFC president, Mohammed Bin Hammam which its goal to raise the standards of Asian football at all levels. The AFC Challenge Cup, which reflected the philosophy of "Vision Asia", was created for teams to experience playing in a continental competition with the possibility to win an AFC trophy and potentially discover new talent. It was held in every two years as its inaugural edition took place on 2006 in Bangladesh. This 2014 Challenge Cup was the last season, due to the expansion of participating national teams in the AFC Asian Cup from 16 to 24. Maldives won the hosting rights, with two renovated stadiums (Addu Football Stadium and National Football Stadium) were used as venues in the tournament. The winner qualifies for the 2015 AFC Asian Cup.

The two countries met twice before the finals match. Their first meeting was in the qualification phase of the 2012 AFC Challenge Cup on 23 March 2011 which ended in a goalless draw. While their second match together was at the 2012 AFC Challenge Cup third-place playoff, where the Filipinos won the game, 4–3. That result causes the Philippines to grab their best finish yet in a major tournament and in the Challenge Cup. Michael Weiss, then head coach of the Philippines congratulated his team by "showing their fighting spirit" throughout the game. He later admitted that "[he did not] expected the match to go that way". While, Palestine head coach Jamal Mahmoud described their last game against them was "the worst game that we ever played in international football". Like the Philippines, Palestine also made history as they were the first West Asian team to be in the knockout stage of the tournament. The Philippines were considered the "favorites" heading towards the game. Goal.com predicted that the Filipinos were more likely to beat Palestine in a 2–1 scoreline.

== Route to the final ==
Before going to the main contest proper, all participating countries except Maldives competed in a qualifying round. Twenty nations confirmed their interest to take part in the AFC Challenge Cup qualifiers with Brunei withdrawing a day before the qualifiers citing "unavoidable circumstances". The winner of each group, and the best and better ranked second placed teams qualified for the AFC Challenge Cup proper. The teams in the group stages was trimmed down to eight, with the first and second ranked teams of each group advancing to the knockout stage.

Palestine		Round	Philippines	
AFC Challenge Cup
Opponent	Result	Qualifying round	Opponent	Result
Bangladesh	1–0	Qualifying Matchday 1	Brunei	Cancelled
Northern Mariana Islands	9–0	Qualifying Matchday 2	Cambodia	8–0
Nepal	0–0	Qualifying Matchday 3	Turkmenistan	1–0
Group D first place: Team / Pld / W / D / L / GF / GA / GD / Pts; Palestine / 3 / 2 / 1 / 0 / 10 / 0 / +10 / 7; Bangladesh / 3 / 2 / 0 / 1 / 6 / 1 / +5 / 6; Nepal / 3 / 1 / 1 / 1 / 6 / 2 / +4 / 4; Northern Mariana Islands / 3 / 0 / 0 / 3 / 0 / 19 / −19 / 0; Source: RSSSF		Qualifying round standings	Group E first place: Team / Pld / W / D / L / GF / GA / GD / Pts; Philippines / 2 / 2 / 0 / 0 / 9 / 0 / +9 / 6; Turkmenistan / 2 / 1 / 0 / 1 / 7 / 1 / +6 / 3; Cambodia / 2 / 0 / 0 / 2 / 0 / 15 / −15 / 0; Source: RSSSF	
Opponent	Result	Group stage	Opponent	Result
Kyrgyzstan	1–0	Matchday 1	Afghanistan	0–0
Myanmar	2–0	Matchday 2	Laos	2–0
Maldives	0–0	Matchday 3	Turkmenistan	2–0
Group A first place: Team / Pld / W / D / L / GF / GA / GD / Pts; Palestine / 3 / 2 / 1 / 0 / 3 / 0 / +3 / 7; Maldives (H) / 3 / 1 / 1 / 1 / 4 / 3 / +1 / 4; Kyrgyzstan / 3 / 1 / 0 / 2 / 1 / 3 / −2 / 3; Myanmar / 3 / 1 / 0 / 2 / 3 / 5 / −2 / 3; Source: RSSSF (H) Hosts		Final standings	Group B first place: Team / Pld / W / D / L / GF / GA / GD / Pts; Philippines / 3 / 2 / 1 / 0 / 4 / 0 / +4 / 7; Afghanistan / 3 / 1 / 2 / 0 / 3 / 1 / +2 / 5; Turkmenistan / 3 / 1 / 0 / 2 / 6 / 6 / 0 / 3; Laos / 3 / 0 / 1 / 2 / 1 / 7 / −6 / 1; Source: RSSSF	
Opponent	Result	Knockout stage	Opponent	Result
Afghanistan	2–0	Semi-finals	Maldives	3–2 (aet)

== Match ==
30 May 2014
21:00 MVT

Palestine	1–0	Philippines
Nu'man 59'	Report

National Football Stadium, Malé
Attendance: 6,300
Referee: Valentin Kovalenko (Uzbekistan)

Palestine	Philippines

GK	21	Ramzi Saleh (c)
DF	2	Raed Fares
DF	15	Abdelatif Bahdari
DF	16	Haytham Theeb
MF	14	Abdullah Jaber
MF	19	Abdelhamid Abuhabib	(yellow card) 83'	(substituted off) 86'
MF	20	Khader Yousef
MF	23	Murad Ismail Said
MF	8	Hilal Musa		(substituted off) 77'
FW	10	Imad Zatara		(substituted off) 90+1'
FW	7	Ashraf Nu'man	(yellow card) 90+4'
Substitutes:
GK	1	Tawfiq Ali
GK	22	Ghanem Mahajneh
DF	3	Hussam Abu Saleh		(substituted on) 77'
DF	5	Omar Jarun		(substituted on) 90+1'
DF	6	Mousa Abu Jazar		(substituted on) 86'
DF	13	Khaled Mahdi
DF	18	Mus'ab Al-Batat
FW	9	Tamer Seyam
FW	11	Ahmad Maher Wridat
FW	17	Rami Musalmeh
Head coach:
(Jordan) Jamal Mahmoud
Manager:
Abdallah Alfara

GK	15	Roland Müller
RB	23	Simone Rota		(substituted off) 82'
CB	12	Amani Aguinaldo
CB	2	Rob Gier (c)
LB	21	Martin Steuble	(yellow card) 90+5'
RM	11	Patrick Reichelt	(yellow card) 69'
CM	6	Jason de Jong
LM	3	Daisuke Sato
AM	22	Paul Mulders		(substituted off) 73'
AM	17	Stephan Schröck		(substituted off) 46'
CF	10	Phil Younghusband
Substitutes:
GK	1	Neil Etheridge
GK	16	Patrick Deyto
DF	4	Anton del Rosario
DF	5	Juan Guirado
MF	7	James Younghusband
MF	14	Simon Greatwich
MF	18	Chris Greatwich
MF	19	Jerry Lucena		(substituted on) 46'
MF	20	OJ Porteria		(substituted on) 73'
FW	9	Kenshiro Daniels		(substituted on) 82'
FW	13	Ruben Doctora
Head coach:
(United States) Thomas Dooley
Manager:
Dan Palami

Assistant referees:
Rafael Ilyasov (Uzbekistan)
Lee Jung-min (South Korea)
Fourth official:
Ko Hyung-jin (South Korea)

Match rules

- 90 minutes.
- 30 minutes of extra time if necessary.
- Penalty shoot-out if scores still level.
- Maximum of twelve named substitutes.
- Maximum of three substitutions.
