= Palestine national football team results (2010–2019) =

This is a list of the Palestine national football team results from 2010 to 2019.

Palestinians continued to be unable to qualify for the World Cup finals as their qualifying campaign ended early. However, the closest chance to qualify was in 2018 when the Palestinian national team collected 14 points (Note: Palestine initially accumulated 12 points, however the FIFA later awarded Palestine a 3–0 win (originally finished 1–1) over Timor-Leste.) and was close to advancing to the crucial stage, but losing in the penultimate round ended their hopes. The Palestinian team failed to reach four tournaments in a row but managed to reach the last two Asian Cup finals, first in 2015. So far, the best Palestinian result in the tournament is still the group stage. In addition, the team has climbed to 73rd which is their best position in the FIFA World Rankings since the Palestinian Federation re-joined in 1998.

== Results ==
=== 2010 ===
| 4 June 2010 Friendly | Sudan | 1–1 | Palestine | Omdurman, Sudan |
| --:-- UTC+2 |

| 11 August 2010 Friendly | Mauritania | 0–0 | Palestine | Nouakchott, Mauritania |
| --:-- UTC+0 | | | | Stadium: Stade Olympique |

| 27 September 2010 2010 WAFF | Palestine | 1–3 | Yemen | Amman, Jordan |
| 19:00 UTC+3 | Obeid 79' | | Al-Nono 43' (pen.), 83'; Thabit 63' | Stadium: King Abdullah Stadium; Attendance: 10,000; Referee: Nasser Al-Ghafari (Jordan) |

| 29 September 2010 2010 WAFF | Palestine | 0–3 | Iraq | Amman, Jordan |
| 19:00 UTC+3 | | | Karim 15', 76'; Akram 86' (pen.) | Stadium: King Abdullah Stadium; Attendance: 14,000 |

=== 2011 ===
| 9 February 2011 Friendly | Tanzania | 1–0 | Palestine | Dar es Salaam, Tanzania |
| --:-- UTC+3 | Ngassa 61' | | | Stadium: National Stadium; Referee: Odan Mbaga (Tanzania) |

| 21 March 2011 2012 AFC CCQ | Palestine | 2–0 | Bangladesh | Yangon, Myanmar |
| 18:00 UTC+6:30 | Alyan 46', 65' | | | Stadium: Thuwunna Stadium; Attendance: 1,000; Referee: Jameel Abdulhusain Mohamed (Bahrain) |

| 23 March 2011 2012 AFC CCQ | Philippines | 0–0 | Palestine | Yangon, Myanmar |
| 15:30 UTC+6:30 | | | | Stadium: Thuwunna Stadium; Attendance: 500; Referee: Ali Sabah Adday Al-Qaysi (Iraq) |

| 25 March 2011 2012 AFC CCQ | Myanmar | 1–3 | Palestine | Yangon, Myanmar |
| 15:30 UTC+6:30 | Zaw Htat Aung 25' (pen.) | | Alyan 39', 90'; Harbi 71' | Stadium: Thuwunna Stadium; Attendance: 1,500; Referee: Jameel Abdulhusain Mohamed (Bahrain) |

| 29 June 2011 2014 WCQ | Afghanistan | 0–2 | Palestine | Tursunzoda, Tajikistan |
| 16:00 UTC+5 | | | Alyan 22'; Amour 88' | Stadium: Stadium Metallurg 1st District; Attendance: 5,00; Referee: Nasser Darwish (Jordan) |

| 3 July 2011 2014 WCQ | Palestine | 1–1 | Afghanistan | Al-Ram, Palestine |
| 17:00 UTC+3 | Wadi 12' | | Arezou 63' | Stadium: Faisal Al-Husseini International Stadium; Attendance: 9,000; Referee: Banjar Al-Dosari (Qatar) |

| 23 July 2011 2014 WCQ | Thailand | 1–0 | Palestine | Buriram, Thailand |
| 18:00 UTC+7 | Kaewprom 18' | | | Stadium: New I-Mobile Stadium; Attendance: 17,000; Referee: Lee Min-hu (Korea Republic) |

| 28 July 2011 2014 WCQ | Palestine | 2–2 | Thailand | Al-Ram, Palestine |
| 18:00 UTC+3 | Alyan 5', 90' | | Thonglao 34', 90+3' | Stadium: Faisal Al-Husseini International Stadium; Attendance: 11,500; Referee: Salah Abbas Alabbasi (Bahrain) |

| 22 August 2011 Friendly | Indonesia | 4–1 | Palestine | Surakarta, Indonesia |
| 20:30 UTC+7 | Hariono 65'; Gonzáles 70'; Bambang 77', 85' | | Obeid 48' | Stadium: Manahan Stadium; Attendance: 25,000 |

| 5 October 2011 Friendly | Iran | 7–0 | Palestine | Tehran, Iran |
| 19:30 UTC+3:30 | Ghazi 45+1'; Ansarifard 50'; Nekounam 55' (pen.); Kazemian 58', 90+1' (pen.); Montazeri 59'; Nouri 70' | | | Stadium: Azadi Stadium; Attendance: 5,000; Referee: Saeid Mozaffarizadeh (Iran) |

| 6 December 2011 Friendly | Bahrain | 0–1 | Palestine | Muharraq, Bahrain |
| --:-- UTC+3 |

| 14 December 2011 2011 Pan Arab Games | Palestine | 1–1 | Libya | Doha, Qatar |
| 19:30 UTC+3 | Zatara 88' | | Boussefi 41' | Stadium: Al-Gharafa Stadium; Attendance: Fahad Al-Mirdasi (Saudi Arabia) |

| 17 December 2011 2011 Pan Arab Games | Sudan | 0–2 | Palestine | Al Rayyan, Qatar |
| 17:30 UTC+3 | | | El-Khatib 39'; Al-Amour 62' | Stadium: Ahmed bin Ali Stadium; Referee: Ali Al-Samahiji (Bahrain) |

| 20 December 2011 2011 Pan Arab Games | Bahrain | 3–1 | Palestine | Doha, Qatar |
| 17:30 UTC+3 | Al Alawi 6'; Isa 44'; Abu Saleh 58' (o.g.) | | Nu'man 40' (pen.) | Stadium: Al-Gharafa Stadium; Referee: Andre El Haddad (Lebanon) |

| 22 December 2011 2011 Pan Arab Games | Palestine | 0–3 (a.e.t.) | Kuwait | Doha, Qatar |
| 19:30 UTC+3 | | | Al-Musawi 92'; Al-Rashidi 94'; Al-Mutawa 119' | Stadium: Al-Gharafa Stadium; Referee: Mohamed Al-Zarouni (United Arab Emirates) |

=== 2012 ===
| 24 February 2012 Friendly | United Arab Emirates | 3–0 | Palestine | Abu Dhabi, United Arab Emirates |
| --:-- UTC+3 | | | | Stadium: Al Nahyan Stadium |

| 8 March 2012 2012 AFC CC | Nepal | 0–2 | Palestine | Kathmandu, Nepal |
| 17:00 UTC+5:30 | | | Attieh 4'; Attal 65' | Stadium: Dasarath Rangasala Stadium; Attendance: 12,300; Referee: Ryuji Sato (Japan) |

| 10 March 2012 2012 AFC CC | Palestine | 0–0 | Turkmenistan | Kathmandu, Nepal |
| 15:00 UTC+5:30 | | | | Stadium: Halchowk Stadium; Attendance: 1,000; Referee: Ko Hyung-Jin (Korea Republic) |

| 12 March 2012 2012 AFC CC | Maldives | 0–2 | Palestine | Kathmandu, Nepal |
| 15:00 UTC+5:30 | | | | Stadium: Halchowk Stadium; Attendance: 300; Referee: Dmitriy Mashentsev (Kyrygyzstan) |

| 16 March 2012 2012 AFC CC | North Korea | 2–0 | Palestine | Kathmandu, Nepal |
| 18:30 UTC+5:30 | Pak Kwang-ryong 42', 68' | | | Stadium: Dasarath Rangasala Stadium; Attendance: 3,000; Referee: Yousef Al-Marzouq (Kuwait) |

| 19 March 2012 2012 AFC CC | Philippines | 4–3 | Palestine | Kathmandu, Nepal |
| 14:30 UTC+5:30 | P. Younghusband 4', 25' (pen.); Á. Guirado 42'; J. Guirado 69' | | Abuhabib 21', 67'; Attal 78' | Stadium: Dasarath Rangasala Stadium; Attendance: 1,000; Referee: Ali Sabbagh (Lebanon) |

| 28 May 2012 Friendly | Qatar | 0–0 | Palestine | Doha, Qatar |
| --:-- UTC+3 | | | | Stadium: Jassim bin Hamad Stadium |

| 1 June 2012 Friendly | Vatican City | 1–9 | Palestine | Al-Khader, Palestine |
| --:-- UTC+2 | | | | Stadium: Al-Khader Stadium |

| 18 June 2012 Friendly | Yemen | 1–2 | Palestine | Sanaa, Yemen |
| --:-- UTC+3 | | | | Stadium: Ali Mohsen Al-Muraisi Stadium |

| 25 June 2012 2012 Arab Cup | Kuwait | 2–0 | Palestine | Ta'if, Saudi Arabia |
| 19:45 UTC+3 | Khamis 27'; Al-Rashidi 90+2' | | | Stadium: King Fahd Stadium; Referee: Hamad Al-Sheikh (United Arab Emirates) |

| 28 June 2012 2012 Arab Cup | Saudi Arabia | 2–2 | Palestine | Ta'if, Saudi Arabia |
| 19:45 UTC+3 | Al-Ruwaili 9'; Al-Zylaeei 85' | | Abu Saleh 45+1' (pen.); Al Amour 73' | Stadium: King Fahd Stadium; Referee: Khalid Abdel Rahman (Sudan) |

| 17 November 2012 Friendly | Palestine | 1–1 | Syria | Amman, Jordan |
| --:-- UTC+3 | Abu Jazar 53' | | Al Douni 55' | Stadium: Amman International Stadium |

| 20 November 2012 Friendly | Palestine | 2–1 | Syria | Zarqa, Jordan |
| --:-- UTC+3 | Abu Gharqoud 7'; Abu Saleh 18' (pen.) | | Al Douni 70' (pen.) | Stadium: Prince Mohammed Stadium |

| 29 November 2012 Friendly | Palestine | 0–2 | Bahrain | Al Wakrah, Qatar |
| --:-- UTC+3 | | | | Stadium: Saoud bin Abdulrahman Stadium |

| 8 December 2012 2012 WAFF | Kuwait | 2–1 | Palestine | Kuwait City, Kuwait |
| 17:25 UTC+3 | Nasser 2'; Al-Mutawa 6' (pen.) | | Nu'man 45+1' | Stadium: Al-Sadaqua Walsalam Stadium; Attendance: 1,500; Referee: Ali Sabah Adday Al-Qaysi (Iraq) |

| 11 December 2012 2012 WAFF | Lebanon | 0–1 | Palestine | Al Farwaniyah, Kuwait |
| 19:30 UTC+3 | | | Abugharqud 74' | Stadium: Ali Sabah Al-Salem Stadium; Attendance: 2,000; Referee: Ko Hyung-Jin (South Korea) |

| 14 December 2012 2012 WAFF | Oman | 2–1 | Palestine | Al Farwaniyah, Kuwait |
| 17:25 UTC+3 | Al-Seyabi 5'; Qasim 34' | | Zatara 40' | Stadium: Ali Sabah Al-Salem Stadium; Attendance: 500; Referee: Minoru Tojo (Japan) |

=== 2013 ===
| 6 February 2013 Friendly | India | 2–4 | Palestine | Nepal |
| --:-- UTC+5 |

| 2 March 2013 2013 Challenge Cup qualification | Palestine | 1–0 | Bangladesh | Nepal |
| --:-- UTC+5 |

| 4 March 2013 2013 Challenge Cup qualification | Northern Mariana Islands | 0–9 | Palestine | Nepal |
| --:-- UTC+5 |

| 6 March 2013 2013 Challenge Cup qualification | Nepal | 0–0 | Palestine | Nepal |
| --:-- UTC+5 |

| 21 March 2013 Friendly | Kuwait | 2–1 | Palestine | Kuwait |
| --:-- UTC+3 |

| 17 April 2013 Friendly | Qatar | 2–0 | Palestine | Qatar |
| --:-- UTC+3 |

| 25 December 2013 2014 WAFF | Qatar | 1–0 | Palestine | Qatar |
| --:-- UTC+3 |

=== 2014 ===
| 19 May 2014 2014 Challenge Cup | Palestine | 1–0 | Kyrgyzstan | Malé, Maldives |
| 16:00 UTC+5 | Abuhabib 90+6' | | | Stadium: National Football Stadium; Attendance: 500; Referee: Yudai Yamamoto (Japan) |

| 21 May 2014 2014 Challenge Cup | Myanmar | 0–2 | Palestine | Malé, Maldives |
| 16:00 UTC+5 | | | Abuhabib 45+4'; Nu'man 50' | Stadium: National Football Stadium; Attendance: 600; Referee: Nagor Amir Noor Mohamed (Malaysia) |

| 23 May 2014 2014 Challenge Cup | Maldives | 0–0 | Palestine | Malé, Maldives |
| 21:00 UTC+5 | | | | Stadium: National Football Stadium; Attendance: 8,300; Referee: Yudai Yamamoto (Japan) |

| 27 May 2014 2014 Challenge Cup | Palestine | 2–0 | Afghanistan | Malé, Maldives |
| 15:30 UTC+5 | Nu'man 43' (pen.), 47' | | | Stadium: National Football Stadium; Attendance: 500; Referee: Ko Hyung-jin (South Korea) |

| 30 May 2014 2014 Challenge Cup | Palestine | 1–0 | Philippines | Malé, Maldives |
| 21:00 UTC+5 | Nu'man 59' | | | Stadium: National Football Stadium; Attendance: 6,300; Referee: Valentin Kovalenko (Uzbekistan) |

| 3 September 2014 2014 PFF Peace Cup | Myanmar | 4–1 | Palestine | Manila, Philippines |
| --:-- UTC+8 | | | | Stadium: Rizal Memorial Stadium |

| 6 September 2014 2014 PFF Peace Cup | Palestine | 7–3 (a.e.t.) | Chinese Taipei | Manila, Philippines |
| --:-- UTC+8 | | | | Stadium: Rizal Memorial Stadium |

| 6 October 2014 Friendly | India | 2–3 | Palestine | Siliguri, India |
| --:-- UTC+5 | Ismail 31'; Ismail 36' | Report | Nu'man 9'; Dheeb 51'; Yousef 72' | Stadium: Kanchenjunga Stadium; Referee: Sudish Pandey (Nepal) |

| 12 October 2014 Friendly | Pakistan | 0–2 | Palestine | Lahore, Pakistan |
| --:-- UTC+5 | | Report | Ismail 90'; Jaber 90+2' | Stadium: Punjab Stadium; Attendance: 1,600; Referee: Shahzad Khurram (Pakistan) |

| 6 November 2014 Friendly | Saudi Arabia | 2–0 | Palestine | Dammam, Saudi Arabia |
| --:-- UTC+3 | Hazazi 34'; Al-Muwallad 55' | Report | | Stadium: Prince Mohamed bin Fahd Stadium; Attendance: 2,401; Referee: Omar Mubarak Al Yaqoubi (Oman) |

| 9 November 2014 Friendly | Vietnam | 1–3 | Palestine | Hanoi, Vietnam |
| --:-- UTC+8 | | Report |

| 13 December 2014 Friendly | Uzbekistan | 1–0 | Palestine | Dubai, United Arab Emirates |
| --:-- UTC+4 | | Report |

| 21 December 2014 Friendly | China | 0–0 | Palestine | China |
| --:-- UTC+8 | | Report |

=== 2015 ===
| 12 January 2015 | Japan | 4–0 | Palestine |
| --:-- UTC+11 |

| 16 January 2015 | Palestine | 1–5 | Jordan |
| --:-- UTC+11 |

| 20 January 2015 | Iraq | 2–0 | Palestine |
| --:-- UTC+11 |

| 11 June 2015 2018 World Cup qualification | Saudi Arabia | 3–2 | Palestine |
| --:-- UTC+3 |

| 16 June 2015 2018 World Cup qualification | Malaysia | 0–6 | Palestine |
| --:-- UTC+9 |

| 8 September 2015 2018 World Cup qualification | Palestine | 0–0 | United Arab Emirates |
| --:-- UTC+3 |

| 8 October 2015 2018 World Cup qualification | Timor-Leste | 0–3 Awarded | Palestine |
| --:-- UTC+9 |

| 9 November 2015 2018 World Cup qualification | Palestine | 0–0 | Saudi Arabia |
| --:-- UTC+3 |

| 12 November 2015 2018 World Cup qualification | Palestine | 6–0 | Malaysia |
| --:-- UTC+3 |

=== 2016 ===
| 24 March 2016 2018 World Cup qualification | United Arab Emirates | 2–0 | Palestine |
| --:-- UTC+4 |

| 29 March 2016 2018 World Cup qualification | Palestine | 7–0 | Timor-Leste |
| --:-- UTC+3 |

| 5 September 2016 Friendly | Palestine | 1–1 | Tajikistan |
| --:-- UTC+3 |

| 6 October 2016 Friendly | Tajikistan | 3–3 | Palestine |
| --:-- UTC+5 |

| 10 November 2016 Friendly | Lebanon | 1–1 | Palestine |
| --:-- UTC+3 |

=== 2017 ===
| 22 March 2017 Friendly | Yemen | 0–1 | Palestine |
| --:-- UTC+3 |

| 28 March 2017 | Maldives | 0–3 | Palestine |
| --:-- UTC+5 |

| 6 June 2017 Friendly | Bahrain | 0–2 | Palestine |
| --:-- UTC+6 |

| 13 June 2017 | Palestine | 2–1 | Oman |
| --:-- UTC+3 |

| 5 September 2017 | Bhutan | 0–2 | Palestine |
| --:-- UTC+6 |

| 10 October 2017 | Palestine | 10–0 | Bhutan |
| --:-- UTC+3 |

| 14 November 2017 | Palestine | 8–1 | Maldives |
| --:-- UTC+3 |

=== 2018 ===
| 22 March 2018 Friendly | Bahrain | 0–0 | Palestine | Bahrain |
| --:-- UTC+3 |

| 27 March 2018 Friendly | Oman | 1–0 | Palestine | Oman |
| --:-- UTC+4 |

| 8 May 2018 Friendly | Iraq | 0–0 | Palestine | Iraq |
| --:-- UTC+3 |

| 11 May 2018 Friendly | Kuwait | 2–0 | Palestine | Kuwait |
| --:-- UTC+3 |

| 4 August 2018 Friendly | Palestine | 0–3 | Iraq | Al-Ram, Palestine |
| 17:00 UTC+3 | Maraaba (penalty missed) | | Fanar 5'; Nadhim 34'; Shokan 89' | Stadium: Faisal Al-Husseini International Stadium; Referee: Murad Al Zawahreh (Jordan) |

| 6 September 2018 Friendly | Kyrgyzstan | 1–1 | Palestine | Bishkek, Kyrgyzstan |
| 21:00 UTC+6 | Murzaev 2' | Report | Dabbagh 39' | Stadium: Dolen Omurzakov Stadium; Attendance: 5,200; Referee: Aleksandr Aliyev (Kazakhstan) |

| 11 September 2018 Friendly | Qatar | 3–0 | Palestine | Doha, Qatar |
| 19:00 UTC+3 | Ali 3'; Ak. Afif 19'; Al-Haydos 29' | Report | | Stadium: Khalifa International Stadium; Attendance: 1,766; Referee: Omar Al-Yaqoubi (Oman) |

| 4 October 2018 2018 Bangabandhu Cup | Tajikistan | 0–2 | Palestine | Sylhet, Bangladesh |
| 18:30 UTC+6 | | Report | Cantillana 1'; Bahdari 75' | Stadium: Sylhet District Stadium; Referee: Mizanur Rahman (Bangladesh) |

| 6 October 2018 2018 Bangabandhu Cup | Palestine | 1–0 | Nepal | Sylhet, Bangladesh |
| 18:30 UTC+6 | Salem 70' | Report | | Stadium: Sylhet District Stadium; Referee: Mohammed Jalal Uddin (Bangladesh) |

| 10 October 2018 2018 Bangabandhu Cup | Palestine | 2–0 | Bangladesh | Cox's Bazar, Bangladesh |
| 14:30 UTC+6 | Balah 8'; Maraaba 90+4' | Report | | Stadium: Cox's Bazar Stadium; Referee: Zaid Thamer Mohammed (Iraq) |

| 12 October 2018 2018 Bangabandhu Cup | Tajikistan | 0–0 (a.e.t.) (3–4 p) | Palestine | Dhaka, Bangladesh |
| 17:30 UTC+6 | | Report | | Stadium: Bangabandhu National Stadium; Referee: Mizanur Rahman (Bangladesh) |
| | Penalties |
| | O. Abdugafforov (penalty scored); Nazarov (penalty scored); Asrorov (penalty scored); Tursunov (penalty missed); Davlatmir (penalty missed) | | (penalty scored) Cantillana; (penalty scored) Al Iwisat; (penalty scored) Al-Batat; (penalty scored) Bahdari |

| 16 November 2018 Friendly | Palestine | 2–1 | Pakistan | Al-Ram, Palestine |
| 15:00 UTC+2 | Norambuena 36'; Albadawi 78' | Report | Bashir 16' | Stadium: Faisal Al-Husseini International Stadium; Referee: Imad Al-Bouji (Palestine) |

| 20 November 2018 Friendly | China | 1–1 | Palestine | Haikou, China |
| 20:00 UTC+8 | Feng Xiaoting 9' | Report | Islame 62' | Stadium: Wuyuan River Stadium; Referee: Hettikamkanamge Perera (Sri Lanka) |

| 24 December 2018 Friendly | Palestine | 1–1 | Iran | Doha, Qatar |
| 17:00 UTC+3 | Cantillana 90+2' | Report | Taremi 50' | Stadium: Abdullah bin Khalifa Stadium; Attendance: 100; Referee: Wathik Mohammed (Iraq) |

| 28 December 2018 Friendly | Iraq | 1–0 | Palestine | Doha, Qatar |
| 18:00 UTC+3 | Tariq 46' | Report | | Stadium: Suheim bin Hamad Stadium |

| 31 December 2018 Friendly | Palestine | 1–2 | Kyrgyzstan | Doha, Qatar |
| 15:00 UTC+3 | | | | Stadium: Suheim bin Hamad Stadium |

=== 2019 ===
| 6 January 2019 2019 Asian Cup | Syria | 0–0 | Palestine | Sharjah, United Arab Emirates |
| 20:00 UTC+4 | | Report | | Stadium: Sharjah Stadium; Attendance: 8,471; Referee: Ravshan Irmatov (Uzbekistan) |

| 11 January 2019 2019 Asian Cup | Palestine | 0–3 | Australia | Dubai, United Arab Emirates |
| 15:00 UTC+4 | | Report | Maclaren 18'; Mabil 20'; Giannou 90' | Stadium: Rashid Stadium; Attendance: 11,915; Referee: Valentin Kovalenko (Uzbekistan) |

| 15 January 2019 2019 Asian Cup | Palestine | 0–0 | Jordan | Abu Dhabi, United Arab Emirates |
| 17:30 UTC+4 | | Report | | Stadium: Mohammed bin Zayed Stadium; Attendance: 20,843; Referee: Mohanad Qassim (Iraq) |

| 11 June 2019 Friendly | Kyrgyzstan | 2–2 | Palestine | Bishkek, Kyrgyzstan |
| 20:00 UTC+6 | Rustamov 31'; Murzaev 49' | Report | Seyam 57'; Bahdari 88' (pen.) | Stadium: Dolen Omurzakov Stadium; Attendance: 13,000; Referee: Artyom Kuchin (Kazakhstan) |

| 30 July 2019 2019 WAFF | Yemen | 0–1 | Palestine | Karbala, Iraq |
| 22:30 UTC+3 | | Report | Hamed 26' | Stadium: Karbala Sports City; Attendance: 200; Referee: Mahmood Al-Majarafi (Oman) |

| 2 August 2019 2019 WAFF | Palestine | 1–2 | Iraq | Karbala, Iraq |
| 19:30 UTC+3 | Batran 3' (pen.) | Report | Abdul-Raheem 22'; Ali 83' (pen.) | Stadium: Karbala Sports City; Referee: Turki Al-Khudhayr (Saudi Arabia) |

| 5 August 2019 2019 WAFF | Lebanon | 0–0 | Palestine | Karbala, Iraq |
| 22:30 UTC+3 | | Report | | Stadium: Karbala Sports City; Attendance: 500; Referee: Saad Khalefah (Kuwait) |

| 11 August 2019 2019 WAFF | Palestine | 4–3 | Syria | Karbala, Iraq |
| 19:30 UTC+3 | Batran 45+3'; Dabbagh 60' (pen.), 61'; Yamin 89' | Report | Mobayed 3'; Al-Khatib 66' (pen.); Mardikian 73' | Stadium: Karbala Sports City; Referee: Saad Khalefah (Kuwait) |

| 5 September 2019 2022 World Cup qualification | Palestine | 2–0 | Uzbekistan | Al-Ram, Palestine |
| 17:00 UTC+3 | Dabbagh 60'; Batran 85' | Report (FIFA); Report (AFC) | | Stadium: Faisal Al-Husseini International Stadium; Attendance: 6,740; Referee: Fu Ming (China) |

| 10 September 2019 2022 World Cup qualification | Singapore | 2–1 | Palestine | Kallang, Singapore |
| 19:45 UTC+8 | Shakir 3'; Safuwan 38' | Report (FIFA); Report (AFC) | Hamed 13' | Stadium: Jalan Besar Stadium; Attendance: 6,011; Referee: Yu Ming-hsun (Chinese Taipei) |

| 15 October 2019 2022 World Cup qualification | Palestine | 0–0 | Saudi Arabia | Al-Ram, Palestine |
| 16:00 UTC+3 | | Report (FIFA); Report (AFC) | | Stadium: Faisal Al-Husseini International Stadium; Attendance: 12,000; Referee: Ahmed Al-Kaf (Oman) |

| 14 November 2019 2022 World Cup qualification | Yemen | 1–0 | Palestine | Muharraq, Bahrain |
| 18:00 UTC+3 | Al-Dahi 54' | Report (FIFA); Report (AFC) | | Stadium: Sheikh Ali Bin Mohamad Stadium; Attendance: 530; Referee: Adham Makhadmeh (Jordan) |

| 19 November 2019 2022 World Cup qualification | Uzbekistan | 2–0 | Palestine | Tashkent, Uzbekistan |
| 17:00 UTC+5 | Shomurodov 18', 58' | Report (FIFA); Report (AFC) | | Stadium: Pakhtakor Central Stadium; Attendance: 19,143; Referee: Nawaf Shukralla (Bahrain) |

== Head-to-head records ==
| Opponent | Pld | W | D | L | GF | GA | GD | Pts | Confederation |
|---|---|---|---|---|---|---|---|---|---|
| Afghanistan | 3 | 2 | 1 | 0 | 5 | 1 | +4 | 7 | AFC |
| Australia | 1 | 0 | 0 | 1 | 0 | 3 | –3 | 0 | AFC |
| Bahrain | 5 | 2 | 1 | 2 | 4 | 5 | –1 | 7 | AFC |
| Bangladesh | 3 | 3 | 0 | 0 | 5 | 0 | +5 | 9 | AFC |
| Bhutan | 2 | 2 | 0 | 0 | 12 | 0 | +12 | 6 | AFC |
| China | 2 | 0 | 2 | 0 | 1 | 1 | 0 | 2 | AFC |
| Chinese Taipei | 1 | 1 | 0 | 0 | 7 | 3 | +4 | 3 | AFC |
| India | 2 | 2 | 0 | 0 | 7 | 4 | +3 | 6 | AFC |
| Indonesia | 1 | 0 | 0 | 1 | 1 | 4 | –3 | 0 | AFC |
| Iran | 2 | 0 | 1 | 1 | 1 | 8 | –7 | 1 | AFC |
| Iraq | 6 | 0 | 1 | 5 | 1 | 11 | –10 | 1 | AFC |
| Japan | 1 | 0 | 0 | 1 | 0 | 4 | –4 | 0 | AFC |
| Jordan | 2 | 0 | 1 | 1 | 1 | 5 | –4 | 1 | AFC |
| Kuwait | 5 | 0 | 0 | 5 | 2 | 11 | –9 | 0 | AFC |
| Kyrgyzstan | 4 | 1 | 2 | 1 | 5 | 5 | 0 | 5 | AFC |
| Lebanon | 3 | 1 | 2 | 0 | 2 | 1 | +1 | 5 | AFC |
| Libya | 1 | 0 | 1 | 0 | 1 | 1 | 0 | 1 | CAF |
| Malaysia | 2 | 2 | 0 | 0 | 12 | 0 | +12 | 6 | AFC |
| Maldives | 4 | 3 | 1 | 0 | 13 | 1 | +12 | 10 | AFC |
| Mauritania | 1 | 0 | 1 | 0 | 0 | 0 | 0 | 1 | CAF |
| Myanmar | 3 | 2 | 0 | 1 | 6 | 5 | +1 | 6 | AFC |
| Nepal | 3 | 2 | 1 | 0 | 3 | 0 | +3 | 7 | AFC |
| North Korea | 1 | 0 | 0 | 1 | 0 | 2 | –2 | 0 | AFC |
| Oman | 3 | 1 | 0 | 2 | 3 | 4 | –1 | 3 | AFC |
| Pakistan | 2 | 2 | 0 | 0 | 4 | 1 | +3 | 6 | AFC |
| Philippines | 3 | 1 | 1 | 1 | 4 | 4 | 0 | 4 | AFC |
| Qatar | 4 | 0 | 1 | 3 | 0 | 6 | –6 | 1 | AFC |
| Saudi Arabia | 5 | 0 | 3 | 2 | 4 | 7 | –3 | 3 | AFC |
| Singapore | 1 | 0 | 0 | 1 | 1 | 2 | –1 | 0 | AFC |
| Sudan | 2 | 1 | 1 | 0 | 3 | 1 | +2 | 4 | CAF |
| Syria | 4 | 2 | 2 | 0 | 7 | 5 | +2 | 8 | AFC |
| Tajikistan | 4 | 1 | 3 | 0 | 6 | 4 | +2 | 6 | AFC |
| Tanzania | 1 | 0 | 0 | 1 | 0 | 1 | –1 | 0 | CAF |
| Thailand | 2 | 0 | 1 | 1 | 2 | 3 | –1 | 1 | AFC |
| Timor-Leste | 2 | 2 | 0 | 0 | 10 | 0 | +10 | 6 | AFC |
| Turkmenistan | 1 | 0 | 1 | 0 | 0 | 0 | 0 | 1 | AFC |
| United Arab Emirates | 3 | 0 | 1 | 2 | 0 | 5 | –5 | 1 | AFC |
| Uzbekistan | 3 | 1 | 0 | 2 | 2 | 3 | –1 | 3 | AFC |
| Vietnam | 1 | 1 | 0 | 0 | 3 | 1 | +2 | 3 | AFC |
| Yemen | 5 | 3 | 0 | 2 | 5 | 5 | 0 | 9 | AFC |
| Total | 104 | 39 | 26 | 39 | 153 | 119 | +34 | 143 | |
