= Turkmenistan national football team records and statistics =

This is a list of Turkmenistan national football team's all kinds of competitive records.

== Individual records ==
=== Player records ===
==== Most capped players ====
Rank	Player	Caps	Goals	Career
1	Arslanmyrat Amanow	49	13	2009–present
2	Bahtiýar Hojaahmedow	40	1	2008–2017
2	Kamil Mingazow	40	3	1992–2004
4	Serdar Annaorazow	39	0	2012–present
4	Omar Berdiýew	39	1	2000–2010
4	Begençmuhammet Kulyýew	39	11	1997–2006
7	Gurbangeldi Durdyýew	36	2	1992–2004
8	Wladimir Baýramow	35	16	2000–2013
9	Amandurdy Annadurdyýew	33	2	1992–2003
10	Şöhrat Söýünow	32	0	2011–present

==== Top goalscorers ====
Rank	Player	Goals	Caps	Ratio	Career
1	Wladimir Baýramow	16	35	0.46	2000–2013
2	Çaryýar Muhadow	13	18	0.72	1992–2000
2	Arslanmyrat Amanow	13	49	0.27	2009–present
4	Rejepmyrat Agabaýew	12	30	0.4	1994–2004
5	Begençmuhammet Kulyýew	11	39	0.28	2000–2013
6	Berdymyrat Şamyradow	10	24	0.42	2008–2015
7	Guwançmuhammet Öwekow	9	23	0.39	2003–2010
7	Muslim Agaýew	9	25	0.36	1994–2007
9	Altymyrat Annadurdyýew	7	22	0.32	2015–present
10	Didargylyç Urazow	6	18	0.33	1996–2003
10	Mämmedaly Garadanow	6	22	0.27	2004–2011

== Competition records ==
=== FIFA World Cup ===
FIFA World Cup record									FIFA World Cup qualification record					
Year	Round	Position	Pld	W	D*	L	GF	GA	Pld	W	D	L	GF	GA
(Uruguay) 1930 to (Italy) 1990	Part of Soviet Union								Part of Soviet Union					
(United States) 1994	Did not enter								Did not enter					
(France) 1998	Did not qualify								6	2	0	4	8	13
(South Korea) (Japan) 2002	Did not qualify								6	4	0	2	12	7
(Germany) 2006	Did not qualify								8	4	1	3	21	10
(South Africa) 2010	Did not qualify								10	3	1	5	9	13
(Brazil) 2014	Did not qualify								2	0	1	1	4	5
(Russia) 2018	Did not qualify								8	4	1	3	10	11
(Qatar) 2022	Did not qualify								6	3	0	3	8	11
(Canada) (Mexico) (United States) 2026	To be determined								To be determined					
Total	–	0/22	–	–	–	–	–	–	46	20	4	21	72	70

=== AFC Asian Cup ===
AFC Asian Cup record									AFC Asian Cup qualification record					
Year	Result	Position	Pld	W	D	L	GF	GA	Pld	W	D	L	GF	GA
(Hong Kong) 1956 to (Qatar) 1988	Part of Soviet Union								Part of Soviet Union					
(Japan) 1992	Did not enter								Did not enter					
(United Arab Emirates) 1996	Did not qualify								4	0	1	3	3	8
(Lebanon) 2000	Did not qualify								4	3	0	1	15	6
(China) 2004	Round 1	12th	3	0	1	2	4	6	6	4	2	0	10	2
(Indonesia) (Malaysia) (Thailand) (Vietnam) 2007	Did not enter								Did not enter					
(Qatar) 2011	Did not enter								Did not enter					
(Australia) 2015	Did not enter								Did not enter					
(United Arab Emirates) 2019	Group stage	21st	3	0	0	3	3	10	14	7	2	5	19	21
(China) 2023	To be determined								To be determined					
Total	Best: Group stage	2/17	6	0	1	5	7	16	28	14	5	9	47	37

- 2010 AFC Challenge Cup was used to determine qualification for the 2011 AFC Asian Cup qualification

=== Asian Games ===
Asian Games record
Year	Result	Pld	W	D*	L	GF	GA
National team
(Japan) Hiroshima 1994	Quarter-finals	5	1	3	1	7	9
(Thailand) Bangkok 1998	Quarter-finals	6	3	2	1	10	9
Total	Best: Quarter-finals	11	4	5	2	17	18

Note: As of 2002, only U23 teams are allowed to participate in the Asian Games' football tournament.

=== AFC Challenge Cup ===
AFC Challenge Cup record
Year	Result	Pld	W	D	L	GF	GA
(Bangladesh) 2006	Did not enter						
(India) 2008	Group stage	3	1	1	1	6	2
(Sri Lanka) 2010	Runners-up	5	3	2	0	6	2
(Nepal) 2012	Runners-up	5	3	1	1	9	4
(Maldives) 2014	Group stage	3	1	0	2	6	6
Total	Best: Runners-up	16	8	4	4	27	14

=== Central Asian Championship ===
Year	Round	Pld	W	D*	L	GF	GA	GD	Pts
(Uzbekistan) 2018	-	-	-	-	-	-	-	-	-
Total	-	-	-	-	-	-	-	-	-

=== RCD Cup/ECO Cup ===
Year	Round	Pld	W	D	L	GF	GA
(Iran) 1965 to (Turkey) 1974	No international team						
(Iran) 1993	Runners-up	4	2	0	2	6	5
Total	Best: Runners-up	4	2	0	2	6	5

== Head-to-head record ==
The list shown below shows the Turkmenistan national football team all-time international record against opposing nations.

As of 31 March 2026

Team	Pld	W	D	L	GF	GA	GD	Confederation
Afghanistan	5	4	0	1	21	3	+18	AFC
Armenia	1	0	0	1	0	1	-1	UEFA
Azerbaijan	2	1	0	1	2	3	-1	UEFA
Bangladesh	1	1	0	0	2	1	+1	AFC
Bahrain	6	0	2	4	4	15	-11	AFC
Bhutan	2	2	0	0	15	0	+15	AFC
Brunei^{a}	1	1	0	0	3	0	+3	AFC
Cambodia	3	3	0	0	12	1	+11	AFC
China	4	0	1	3	3	10	-7	AFC
Chinese Taipei	7	7	0	0	18	4	+14	AFC
Estonia	1	0	1	0	1	1	0	UEFA
Guam	2	1	0	1	1	1	0	AFC
Hong Kong	4	1	3	0	5	2	+3	AFC
India	5	3	1	1	9	7	+2	AFC
Indonesia	5	1	1	3	8	11	-3	AFC
Iran	10	2	3	6	9	19	-10	AFC
Iraq	2	0	0	2	2	6	-4	AFC
Japan	1	0	0	1	2	3	-1	AFC
Jordan	4	2	0	2	4	5	-1	AFC
Kazakhstan	2	0	1	1	0	2	–2	UEFA / AFC
Korea, North	7	1	4	2	7	6	+1	AFC
Korea, South	5	1	0	4	4	16	-12	AFC
Kuwait	5	0	2	3	4	13	-9	AFC
Kyrgyzstan	4	2	1	1	7	3	+4	AFC
Laos	2	2	0	0	9	3	+6	AFC
Lebanon	4	1	0	3	5	8	-3	AFC
Lithuania	1	0	0	1	1	2	-1	UEFA
Malaysia	2	0	0	2	1	4	-3	AFC
Maldives	2	2	0	0	6	2	+4	AFC
Myanmar	1	1	0	0	2	1	+1	AFC
Nepal	2	2	0	0	8	0	+8	AFC
Oman	7	1	0	6	6	14	-8	AFC
Palestine	1	0	1	0	0	0	0	AFC
Pakistan	1	1	0	0	3	0	+3	AFC
Philippines	4	2	0	2	7	4	+3	AFC
Qatar	3	0	0	3	1	8	-7	AFC
Romania	1	0	0	1	0	4	-4	UEFA
Saudi Arabia	4	0	1	3	2	7	-5	AFC
Singapore	3	1	1	1	5	6	-1	AFC
Sri Lanka	8	6	1	1	14	4	+10	AFC
Syria	2	0	1	1	2	6	-4	AFC
Tajikistan	7	2	2	3	6	11	-5	AFC
Thailand	4	1	1	2	7	7	0	AFC
United Arab Emirates	4	1	1	2	4	9	-5	AFC
Uganda	1	0	1	0	0	0	0	AFC
Uzbekistan	14	1	1	11	8	34	-26	AFC
Vietnam	6	5	0	1	12	4	+8	AFC
Yemen	3	3	0	0	7	1	+6	AFC
Total	176	65	31	80	259	272	–13	

^a Turkmenistan was supposed to face Brunei in the 2014 AFC Challenge Cup qualifiers but the latter withdrew from the tournament. Turkmenistan was awarded a 3-goal victory for the supposed match.
