= 2011 Al-Nakba International Football Tournament =

بطولة فلسطين الدولية 2011

Tournament details
- Host country: Palestine
- Dates: 14–23 May
- Teams: 16 (from 3 confederations)

Final positions
- Champions: (Hungary) Csepel (1st title)
- Runners-up: (Palestine) Hilal Al-Quds
- Third place: (Palestine) Markaz Balata
- Fourth place: (Palestine) Taraji Wadi Al-Nes

Tournament statistics
- Matches played: 28

The 2011 Al-Nakba International Football Tournament was a football competition organized by the Palestinian Football Association to commemorate the Nakba. It was held in Palestine in May 2011, and featured an appearance by the then-president of FIFA, Sepp Blatter.

== Teams ==
16 teams participated from:

- Chile
- Hungary
- Jordan
- Mauritania
- Palestine (hosts)
- Senegal
- South Africa
- Syria

== Groups ==
=== Group A ===
| Pos | Team | Pld | W | D | L | GF | GA | GD | Pts | Qualification |
|---|---|---|---|---|---|---|---|---|---|---|
| 1 | (Palestine) Taraji Wadi Al-Nes | 3 | 1 | 2 | 0 | 6 | 3 | +3 | 5 | Advance to knockout stage |
| 2 | (Chile) Palestino | 3 | 1 | 2 | 0 | 6 | 5 | +1 | 5 | |
| 3 | (Jordan) Al-Jazeera | 3 | 1 | 1 | 1 | 7 | 6 | +1 | 4 | |
| 4 | (Palestine) Shabab Al-Dhahiriya | 3 | 0 | 1 | 2 | 3 | 8 | −5 | 1 | |

Source: goalzz
Rules for classification: Group stage tiebreakers

=== Group B ===
| Pos | Team | Pld | W | D | L | GF | GA | GD | Pts | Qualification |
|---|---|---|---|---|---|---|---|---|---|---|
| 1 | (Hungary) Csepel | 3 | 2 | 1 | 0 | 7 | 1 | +6 | 7 | Advance to knockout stage |
| 2 | (Senegal) Diaraf | 3 | 2 | 0 | 1 | 3 | 3 | 0 | 6 | |
| 3 | (Jordan) Al-Yarmouk FC | 3 | 1 | 1 | 1 | 4 | 4 | 0 | 4 | |
| 4 | (Palestine) Markaz Shabab Al-Am'ari | 3 | 0 | 0 | 3 | 1 | 7 | −6 | 0 | |

Source: goalzz
Rules for classification: Group stage tiebreakers

=== Group C ===
| Pos | Team | Pld | W | D | L | GF | GA | GD | Pts | Qualification |
|---|---|---|---|---|---|---|---|---|---|---|
| 1 | (Palestine) Hilal Al-Quds | 3 | 2 | 1 | 0 | 14 | 1 | +13 | 7 | Advance to knockout stage |
| 2 | (Mauritania) Tevragh-Zeina | 3 | 2 | 1 | 0 | 8 | 1 | +7 | 7 | |
| 3 | (Jordan) Al-Baqa'a | 2 | 0 | 0 | 2 | 2 | 7 | −5 | 0 | |
| 4 | South Africa Society | 3 | 0 | 0 | 3 | 3 | 18 | −15 | 0 | |

Source: goalzz
Rules for classification: Group stage tiebreakers

=== Group D ===
| Pos | Team | Pld | W | D | L | GF | GA | GD | Pts | Qualification |
|---|---|---|---|---|---|---|---|---|---|---|
| 1 | (Palestine) Markaz Balata | 3 | 3 | 0 | 0 | 13 | 5 | +8 | 9 | Advance to knockout stage |
| 2 | (Syria) Golan | 3 | 2 | 0 | 1 | 6 | 4 | +2 | 6 | |
| 3 | (Jordan) That Ras Club | 3 | 0 | 1 | 2 | 6 | 8 | −2 | 1 | |
| 4 | (Mauritania) Nasr Teyarett | 3 | 0 | 1 | 2 | 4 | 12 | −8 | 1 | |

Source: goalzz
Rules for classification: Group stage tiebreakers

== Knockout stage ==
Semi-finals
21 May — Al-Ram
(Palestine) Hilal Al-Quds | 1
(Palestine) Taraji Wadi Al-Nes | 0
21 May — Al-Ram
(Hungary) Csepel (p) | 1 (5)
(Palestine) Markaz Balata | 1 (4)

Final
23 May — Al-Ram
(Palestine) Hilal Al-Quds | 0
(Hungary) Csepel | 1
Third place play-off
23 May — Al-Ram
(Palestine) Markaz Balata | 4
(Palestine) Taraji Wadi Al-Nes | 2
