= Bazarov =

Bazarov (Russian: База́ров) is a Russian surname. It derives from the word bazar of Persian origin meaning "marketplace". The feminine form is Bazarova.

Transliterations and variants in other languages include Bazarow, Bazaroff (Germanized).

Bazarov may refer to:

- Aleksey Bazarov (b. 1963), a retired Israeli athlete who specialized in the 400 metres
- Boris Bazarov (1893–1939), a Soviet secret police officer
- Farkhat Bazarov (b. 1980), a Turkmen and Russian professional football player
- Nadezhda Bazarova, a Russian ballerina and ballet teacher
- Vera Bazarova (b. 1993), a Russian pair skater
- Vladimir Bazarov (1874–1939), a Russian journalist and economist

Fictional characters

- Basil Bazarov, from the Tintin comic-strip novel The Broken Ear
- Yevgeny Bazarov, from the Turgenev novel Fathers and Sons
