= Tawfiq Ali =

Palestinian footballer

Personal information
- Full name: Tawfiq Ali Abuhammad
- Date of birth: 8 November 1989 (age 37)
- Place of birth: Gaza
- Height: 1.98 m (6 ft 6 in)
- Position: Goalkeeper

Team information
- Current team: Jabal Al-Mukaber
- Number: 1

Youth career
- Tarji Wadi Al-Nes

Senior career*
Years	Team	Apps	(Gls)
2011–2015	Tarji Wadi Al-Nes	36	(0)
2015–2016	Shabab Dura		
2016–2023	Shabab Al-Khalil		
2023–	Jabal Al-Mukaber		

International career^{‡}
2009–2012	Palestine U23	10	(0)
2011–	Palestine	38	(0)
- * Club domestic league appearances and goals as of 6 June 2014 ‡ National team caps and goals as of 30 March 2021

Tawfiq Ali Abuhammad (Arabic: تَوْفِيق عَلِيّ أَبُو حَمَّاد; born 8 November 1989) is a Palestinian footballer who plays as a goalkeeper for the Palestine national football team and Jabal Al-Mukaber in the West Bank Premier League.

He received his first senior cap in the bronze medal match of the 2011 Pan Arab Games against Kuwait. His first clean sheet as national team goalkeeper came on 29 February 2012 in a friendly against Azerbaijan, that ended with a 2–0 win for Palestine.
