= Haytham Dheeb =

Palestinian footballer

Personal information
- Date of birth: March 12, 1986 (age 40)
- Place of birth: Majd Al-Kurum, Israel
- Height: 1.80 m (5 ft 11 in)
- Position: Center back

Team information
- Current team: Hapoel Arraba

Youth career
- Hapoel Majd al-Krum

Senior career*
Years	Team	Apps	(Gls)
2006–2007	Maccabi Shlomi Nahariya	25	(1)
2007–2009	Maccabi Ironi Tamra	54	(4)
2009–2012	Hilal Al-Quds		
2012–2013	Ihud Bnei Majd al-Krum	0	(0)
2013–2014	Jabal Al-Mukaber		
2014–15	Hilal Al-Quds		
2015–2017	Shabab Al-Khalil		
2017–2018	Jabal Al-Mukaber		
2018–2020	Ahli Al-Khaleel		
2020–2021	Hapoel Bu'eine		
2021–2022	Shabab Al-Khalil		
2022–2025	Hapoel Bu'eine		
2025–	Hapoel Arraba		

International career
2010–2018	Palestine	30	(1)
- * Club domestic league appearances and goals as of June 1st, 2025

Haitham Dheeb (Arabic: هيثم ذيب; born 12 March 1986) is a footballer who plays as a defender for Hapoel Bu'eine in Liga Bet. Born in Israel, he played for the Palestine national team.

== International goals ==
Scores and results list the Palestine's goal tally first.

#	Date	Venue	Opponent	Score	Result	Competition
1.	2 March 2013	Dasarath Rangasala Stadium, Kathmandu	Bangladesh	1–0	1–0	2014 AFC Challenge Cup qualifier
	4 March 2013	Dasarath Rangasala Stadium, Kathmandu	Northern Mariana Islands	5–0	9–0	2014 AFC Challenge Cup qualifier

== Honours ==
=== National team ===
- AFC Challenge Cup: 2014
