= Bahtiýar Hojaahmedow =

Turkmen footballer

Bahtiyar Hojaahmedov
Personal information
- Full name: Bahtiýar Hamrakulowiç Hojaahmedow
- Date of birth: 14 February 1985 (age 41)
- Place of birth: Turkmenabat, Turkmen SSR, Soviet Union
- Height: 1.84 m (6 ft 0 in)
- Position: Defender

Team information
- Current team: Energetik
- Number: 8

Senior career*
Years	Team	Apps	(Gls)
2005–2006	Gazçy	?	(?)
2010	Buxoro	26	(1)
2010	Balkan	?	(?)
2011–2012	Merw	?	(?)
2013	Balkan	?	(?)
2014–2016	Altyn Asyr	?	(?)
2017	Kopetdag	?	(?)
2018	Energetik	?	(?)
2019	Merw	?	(?)
2019–2021	Shagadam	31	(0)
2021	Merw	?	(?)
2022–	Energetik	?	(?)

International career^{‡}
2008–2017	Turkmenistan	40	(1)
- * Club domestic league appearances and goals as of 7 August 2019 ‡ National team caps and goals as of 7 August 2019

Bahtiyar Hamrakulovich Hojaahmedov (Turkmen: Bahtiýar Hamrakulowiç Hojaahmedow; born 14 February 1985) is a Turkmen footballer who plays for Turkmen club Energetik Mary. He was part of the Turkmenistan national team from 2008.

== Club career ==
In 2013 with FC Balkan he won the AFC-President's Cup 2013 in Malaysia.

In 2014, he moved to the FC Altyn Asyr.

The season of 2019 began in FC Merw. In the summer transfer window moved to Şagadam FK.

In summer 2021 Hojaahmedow, as a free agent, signed a contract with FC Merw.

In March 2022, FC Energetik Mary announced the signing of Hojaahmedow.

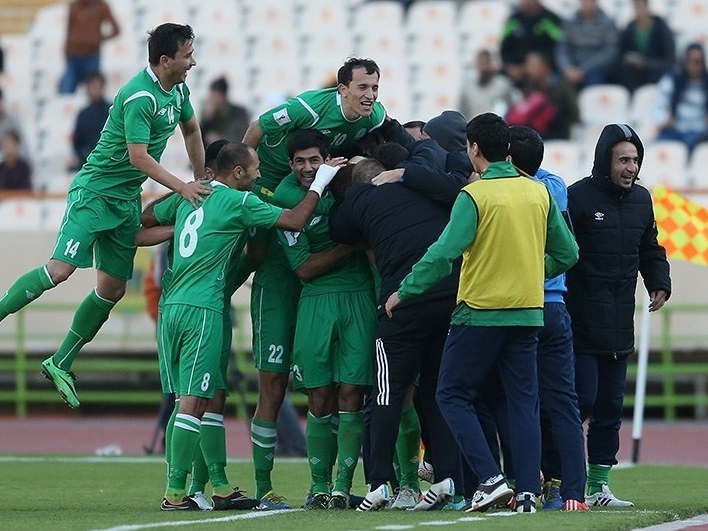
With Turkmenistan in World Cup Qualifying

== International goals ==
No.	Date	Venue	Opponent	Score	Result	Competition
1.	20 May 2014	Addu Football Stadium, Addu City, Maldives	Laos	5–1	5–1	2014 AFC Challenge Cup

== Achievements ==
- AFC President's Cup: 2013
