= Farhat Bazarow =

Turkmenistani footballer (born 1980)

Farkhat Bazarov
Personal information
- Full name: Farkhat Reimbergenovich Bazarov
- Date of birth: 31 January 1980 (age 46)
- Place of birth: Krasnovodsk, Turkmen SSR, USSR (now Türkmenbaşy, Turkmenistan)
- Height: 1.90 m (6 ft 3 in)
- Position: Goalkeeper

Team information
- Current team: FC Strogino (goalkeeper coach)

Senior career*
Years	Team	Apps	(Gls)
1997–1999	Şagadam		
2000–2001	Galkan Aşgabat		
2002–2004	Şagadam		
2005	Nebitçi		
2006	Shurtan Guzar	9	(0)
2007–2008	Kavkaztransgaz-2005	15	(0)
2009	Gazovik	2	(0)
2010	Ahal		
2011–2012	Merw FK		
2013–2014	Balkan		
2015–2016	Energetik		
2017	Şagadam		

International career
2014	Turkmenistan	1	(-2)

Managerial career
- 2027–2020: FC Aşgabat (goalkeeper coach)
- 2021: Strogino U19 (goalkeeper coach)
- 2025–: Strogino (goalkeeper coach)
- * Club domestic league appearances and goals

Farkhat Reimbergenovich Bazarov (Russian: Фархат Реимбергенович Базаров; Turkmen: Farhat Reimbergenowiç Bazarow; born 31 January 1980) is a Turkmenistani former professional football goalkeeper who is goalkeeper coach at Russian club Strogino. He also holds Russian citizenship.

== Club career ==
Bazarow was born on 31 January 1980 in Krasnovodsk, Turkmen SSR (now Türkmenbaşy, Turkmenistan).

He made his debut in professional football in the 1997–98 season with Şagadam FK. In 2000, he was drafted into the army, where he served in the Galkan club. In the summer of 2001, he transferred to FK Köpetdag Aşgabat.

In 2002, he returned to Şagadam FK, and afterward, he moved to the Uzbek club FC Shurtan Guzar.

From 2007 to 2008, he played for the Russian club FC Kavkaztransgaz, and in 2009, he joined FC Gazovik Orenburg. In the second half of 2009, he played for the Turkmen club FC HTTU, with which he won the Turkmenistan Championship and Turkmenistan Super Cup.

In the second half of 2010, he played for FC Ahal, and from 2011 to 2012, he represented the club FC Merw.

In 2013 with FC Balkan he won the AFC President's Cup 2013 in Malaysia.

From 2015, playing for FC Energetik.

== International career ==
Bazarow made his senior Turkmenistan national team debut in the 2014 AFC Challenge Cup in a match against the Philippines (2–0 loss) at 24 May 2024, which was the only national team appearance of his career. He was on the bench for the matches against Afghanistan and Laos in that tournament. He was not called up to the national team again.

== Managerial career ==
In 2017, Bazarow ended his playing career and became a goalkeeping coach at FC Aşgabat.

Since 2021, he has been working as a goalkeeping coach at the Strogino Moscow football school in the Russian Federation.

== Education ==
Bazarow graduated as a Trainer-Instructor from North Ossetian State University named after Kosta Levanovich Khetagurov on 31 August 2007.

== Honours ==
Nebitçi

- AFC President's Cup: 2013

Shagadam

- Champion of Turkmenistan: 2002

HTTU

- Champion of Turkmenistan: 2009

Merv

- Silver Medalist of the Turkmenistan Championship: 2012

Energetik

- Bronze Medalist of the Turkmenistan Championship: 2016
