= Sherzod Shakirov =

Kyrgyzstani footballer

Personal information
- Date of birth: 18 November 1990 (age 35)
- Place of birth: Kirghiz SSR
- Height: 1.82 m (6 ft 0 in)
- Position: Left-back

Team information
- Current team: Kaganat
- Number: 15

Senior career*
Years	Team	Apps	(Gls)
2010–2011	Neftchi Kochkor-Ata		
2012–2014	Alay		
2014–2016	Dordoi		
2016–2017	Al Hala		
2017	KK Shevchenko		
2017	Zugdidi	14	(1)
2018	Neftchi Kochkor-Ata		
2019	Sogdiana Jizzakh	6	(0)
2020–	Kaganat	14	(1)

International career^{‡}
2014–	Kyrgyzstan	12	(0)
- * Club domestic league appearances and goals as of 18:09, 19 September 2021 (UTC) ‡ National team caps and goals as of 24 March 2021

Sherzod Shakirov (born 18 October 1990) is a Kyrgyzstani international footballer who plays professionally for FC Kaganat, as a defender.

== Career ==
In 2017, Sharikov signed for Georgian club FC Zugdidi.

== Career statistics ==
=== International ===
Kyrgyzstan national team
Year	Apps	Goals
2014	5	0
2015	1	0
2016	1	0
2017	0	0
2018	5	0
2019	0	0
2020	0	0
2021	0	0
Total	12	0

Statistics accurate as of match played 20 November 2018

== Honours ==
Neftchi Kochkor-Ata

- Kyrgyzstan League (1); 2010

Alay Osh

- Kyrgyzstan League (1); 2013
- Kyrgyzstan Cup (1): 2013
