= Raed Fares =

Palestinian footballer

Raed Fares رائد فارس
Personal information
- Date of birth: December 6, 1982 (age 43)
- Place of birth: Gaza, Palestine
- Height: 5 ft 7 in (1.70 m)
- Position: Defender

Team information
- Current team: Hilal Al-Quds
- Number: 2

Senior career*
| Years | Team | Apps | (Gls) |
| 2007–2010 | Khadamat Al-Shateh | 16 | (0) |
| 2009–2010 | → Merkaz Asker (loan) | 42 | (0) |
| 2010–2011 | Shabab Al-Khaleel | 36 | (0) |
| 2011– | Hilal Al-Quds | 71 | (1) |

International career^{‡}
| 2011– | Palestine | 27 | (0) |
- * Club domestic league appearances and goals as of June 06, 2014 ‡ National team caps and goals as of June 06, 2014

Raed Fares (Arabic: رائد فارس; born December 6, 1982, in Gaza, Palestine) is a Palestinian professional football (soccer) player currently playing for Jerusalem side Hilal Al-Quds of the West Bank Premier League. He plays primarily as a right back.

Fares received his first national team cap against Iran in an October 2011 friendly. He has since gone on to represent Palestine at the 2011 Pan Arab Games, 2012 AFC Challenge Cup and 2015 AFC Asian Cup.
