= Hilal Musa =

Palestinian footballer

Hilal Musa هلال موسى
Personal information
- Full name: Hilal Musa
- Date of birth: 31 May 1990 (age 36)
- Place of birth: Kafr Manda, Israel
- Height: 1.79 m (5 ft 10 1/2 in)
- Position: Left midfielder

Team information
- Current team: Shabab Al-Khalil

Youth career
- 2003–2008: Hapoel Haifa
- 2008–2009: Maccabi Netanya

Senior career*
Years	Team	Apps	(Gls)
2009–2010	Hapoel Bnei Tamra	27	(5)
2010–2012	Hapoel Rishon LeZion	41	(3)
2012–2013	Maccabi Umm al-Fahm	8	(1)
2013	Maccabi Ahi Nazareth	8	(0)
2013–2015	Shabab Al-Khadr	44	(18)
2015	Hapoel Haifa	0	(0)
2015–2018	Bnei Sakhnin	29	(2)
2018–2019	Ahli Al-Khaleel	14	(6)
2019–2020	Shabab Alsamu	22	(15)
2020–2021	Hapoel Kaukab	18	(2)
2021–	Shabab Al-Khalil	22	(11)

International career^{‡}
2014	Palestine U23	4	(1)
2014–	Palestine	10	(0)
- * Club domestic league appearances and goals as of 1 August 2021 ‡ National team caps and goals as of 1 June 2020

Hilal Musa (Arabic: هلال موسى, Hebrew: הילאל מוסא; born 31 May 1990) is a Palestinian footballer who plays for Shabab Al-Khalil.
