= Vathana Keodouangdeth =

Laotian footballer

Personal information
- Full name: Vathana Keodouangdeth
- Date of birth: January 28, 1996 (age 30)
- Place of birth: Laos
- Height: 1.85 m (6 ft 1 in)
- Position: Goalkeeper

Senior career*
Years	Team	Apps	(Gls)
2014–2017	Lao Toyota		

International career^{‡}
2015–2017	Laos U-23	1	(0)
2014–2017	Laos	5	(0)
- * Club domestic league appearances and goals ‡ National team caps and goals as of 18 October 2016

Vathana Keodouangdeth (born 28 January 1996) is a former Laotian footballer who played as a goalkeeper for the Laotian national team and Lao Toyota.

In the absence of senior goalkeepers, 18-year-old Keodouangdeth played in all three of Laos' games at the 2014 AFC Challenge Cup.

In 2017, Keodouangdeth was banned for life from all football-related activities as a result of match fixing, along with 21 other players of Lao Toyota and the national team.
