= Mousa Abu-Jazar =

Palestinian footballer

Mousa Abu Jazar
Personal information
- Date of birth: August 25, 1987 (age 39)
- Place of birth: Gaza, Palestine
- Height: 5 ft 10 in (1.78 m)
- Positions: Defender; holding midfielder

Team information
- Current team: Shabab Al-Khaleel
- Number: 18

Youth career
- 2007–2008: Shabab Rafah

Senior career*
Years	Team	Apps	(Gls)
2008	Shabab Rafah	2	(0)
2009–2011	Hilal Al-Quds	28	(1)
2011–	Shabab Al-Khaleel	48	(2)

International career^{‡}
2011–2014	Palestine	29	(1)
- * Club domestic league appearances and goals as of June 06, 2014 ‡ National team caps and goals as of June 06, 2014

Mousa Abu Jazar (Arabic: موسى أبو جزر; born 25 August 1987) is a Palestinian footballer who plays as a defender for West Bank League club Shabab Al-Khaleel and the Palestine national team.

== International goals ==
#	Date	Venue	Opponent	Score	Result	Competition
1.	17 November 2012	Amman, Jordan	Syria	1–1	Draw	Friendly

== Honours ==
=== National team ===
- AFC Challenge Cup: 2014
