= Murad Ismail =

Murad Ismail may refer to:

- Murad Ismail (footballer)
- Murad Ismail (politician)
