= Ashraf Nu'man =

Palestinian footballer (born 1986)

Personal information
- Full name: Ashraf Nu'man Al-Fawaghra
- Date of birth: 29 July 1986 (age 40)
- Place of birth: Bethlehem, West Bank
- Height: 6 ft 1 in (1.85 m)
- Positions: Forward; attacking midfielder

Team information
- Current team: Shabab Al-Khalil SC
- Number: 11

Youth career
- Taraji Wadi Al-Nes

Senior career*
Years	Team	Apps	(Gls)
2004–2012	Taraji Wadi Al-Nes	78	(21)
2012–2013	Al-Faisaly (Amman)	13	(9)
2013–2014	Taraji Wadi Al-Nes	20	(12)
2014–2015	Al-Faisaly (Harmah)	24	(6)
2015–2016	Al-Wehdat	9	(0)
2016	Hajer	12	(2)
2016–	Shabab Al-Khalil SC		

International career^{‡}
2009–2016	Palestine	56	(14)
- * Club domestic league appearances and goals as of 6 June 2017 ‡ National team caps and goals as of 29 March 2016

Ashraf Nu'man Al-Fawaghra (Arabic: أشرف نعمان الفواغرة; born 29 July 1986) is a Palestinian professional footballer who plays for Shabab Al-Khalil of the West Bank Premier League and the Palestine national team as a forward or attacking midfielder.

== International career ==
Nu'man received his first national call-up for Palestine during 2010 AFC Challenge Cup qualification and made his debut six months later against the United Arab Emirates. He has since played for Palestine at the 2010 WAFF Championship, 2012 AFC Challenge Cup qualification, and 2014 FIFA World Cup qualification.

He was included in Jamal Mahmoud's 23-man list to participate in the 2014 AFC Challenge Cup. He netted his first goal of the competition in the second game against Myanmar in a 2–0 victory. He then scored a brace in the quarter-final tie against Afghanistan helping his country qualify for their first final ever. During the final against the Philippines, he scored the only goal of the match, coming from a direct free-kick in the 59th minute of the game, winning the 2014 AFC Challenge Cup for his country for the first time ever, and qualifying for the 2015 AFC Asian Cup.

=== International goals ===
Scores and results list Palestine's goal tally first.

#	Date	Venue	Opponent	Score	Result	Competition
1.	20 December 2011	Al-Gharafa Stadium, Doha	Bahrain	1–1	1–3	2011 Pan Arab Games
2.	29 February 2012	The Sevens Stadium, Dubai	Azerbaijan	1–0	2–0	Friendly
3.	12 March 2012	Halchowk Stadium, Kathmandu	Maldives	2–0	2–0	2012 AFC Challenge Cup
4.	18 June 2012	Ali Mohsen Al-Muraisi Stadium, Sana'a	Yemen	1–0	2–1	Friendly
5.	8 December 2012	Al-Sadaqua Walsalam Stadium, Kuwait City	Kuwait	1–2	1–2	2012 WAFF Championship
6.	6 February 2013	Jawaharlal Nehru Stadium, Kochi	India	1–1	4–2	Friendly
7.	6 February 2013	Jawaharlal Nehru Stadium, Kochi	India	3–2	4–2	Friendly
8.	6 February 2013	Jawaharlal Nehru Stadium, Kochi	India	4–2	4–2	Friendly
9.	21 March 2013	Mohammed Al-Hamad Stadium, Hawally	Kuwait	1–1	1–2	Friendly
10.	26 March 2013	Darulmakmur Stadium, Kuantan	Malaysia	2–0	2–0	Friendly
11.	21 May 2014	National Football Stadium, Malé	Myanmar	2–0	2–0	2014 AFC Challenge Cup
12.	27 May 2014	National Football Stadium, Malé	Afghanistan	1–0	2–0	2014 AFC Challenge Cup
13.	27 May 2014	National Football Stadium, Malé	Afghanistan	2–0	2–0	2014 AFC Challenge Cup
14.	30 May 2014	National Football Stadium, Malé	Philippines	1–0	1–0	2014 AFC Challenge Cup
