= Khaled Mahdi (footballer) =

Palestinian footballer

Personal information
- Date of birth: 1 February 1987 (age 39)
- Place of birth: Gaza, Palestine
- Height: 1.85 m (6 ft 1 in)
- Position: Central defender

Team information
- Current team: Al-Am'ary
- Number: 2

Youth career
- Al-Am'ary

Senior career*
Years	Team	Apps	(Gls)
2006–	Al-Am'ary		

International career^{‡}
2009–	Palestine	8	(0)
- * Club domestic league appearances and goals as of June 06, 2014 ‡ National team caps and goals as of June 06, 2014

Khaled Mahdi (Arabic: خالد مهدي; born February 1, 1987) is a Palestinian footballer currently playing for Al-Am'ary of the West Bank Premier League. He started every game of Palestine's 2012 AFC Challenge Cup qualification he has also appeared in three 2014 World Cup qualifiers.
