= 2014 AFC Challenge Cup =

Tournament details
- Host country: Maldives
- Dates: 19–30 May
- Teams: 8
- Venues: 2 (in 2 host cities)

Final positions
- Champions: Palestine (1st title)
- Runners-up: Philippines
- Third place: Maldives
- Fourth place: Afghanistan

Tournament statistics
- Matches played: 16
- Goals scored: 35 (2.19 per match)
- Attendance: 51,500 (3,219 per match)
- Top scorer(s): (Palestine) Ashraf Nu'man (4 goals)
- Best player: (Palestine) Murad Ismail
- Best goalkeeper: (Palestine) Ramzi Saleh

The 2014 AFC Challenge Cup was the fifth and the final edition of the AFC Challenge Cup, an international football competition for Asian Football Confederation (AFC) member nations that are mainly categorized as "emerging countries" in the now defunct Vision Asia programme. It took place in the Maldives from 19 to 30 May 2014. The champions, Palestine, qualified to the 2015 AFC Asian Cup.

Palestine were crowned the victors after winning the final against the Philippines 1–0 after Ashraf Nu'man scored a free kick in the 59th minute. Palestine won the title with a perfect sweep of individual awards. This includes Murad Ismail as the best player, Ramzi Saleh as the best goalkeeper, and Ashraf Nu'man as the top scorer.

== Hosts ==
The AFC decided that an automatic qualification place would be given to the tournament's hosts starting from this edition. Four countries then expressed interest in bidding to host the tournament; India, Maldives, Philippines, and Tajikistan. The AFC announced on 13 November 2012 that the Philippines and Maldives were in the final shortlist to host the finals. The final decision was taken in the AFC Competitions Committee meeting on 28 November 2012, and the hosting rights were given to the Maldives. The Maldives Ministry of Youth and Sports then claimed that they wanted to host the tournament due to the poor facilities they encountered in the 2012 AFC Challenge Cup which the Maldives qualified and competed in.

In mid-November 2013, AFC president Salman bin Ibrahim Al Khalifa announced that the Philippines would be the backup hosts "if something goes wrong in Maldives." By 25 November, the AFC proposed - pending the approval of the Executive Committee - to move the tournament from the Maldives to the Philippines if the Maldives do not start the required renovation work by 15 December 2013. The AFC then inspected possible venues in Manila and the Philippine Football Federation claimed that they would be ready to host the tournament if given the nod. Despite this, the Maldives' Ministry of Youth and Sports said they would do everything necessary for the country to host the tournament. On 7 January 2014, the AFC announced that the Maldives would remain as the host of the 2014 AFC Challenge Cup.

== Venues ==
After the Maldives were given the hosting rights of the tournament, the Maldives' Ministry of Youth and Sports stated that the listed venues below would be used but renovations would be required. Renovations then started in mid-January 2014 and was expected to be completed within 90 days. In a function on 12 May, the National Stadium was handed over to the Ministry of Youth and Sports and opened by President Abdulla Yameen. The stadium was also re-branded as the 'National Football Stadium'. Another function six days later at the second venue, originally known as the Hithadhoo Zone Stadium, was handed over and inaugurated by former President Maumoon Abdul Gayoom. It was also re-branded as the 'Addu Football Stadium'.

Malé, Kaafu Atoll	2014 AFC Challenge Cup is located in Maldives
National Football Stadium	2014 AFC Challenge Cup is located in Maldives
4°10′26.7″N 73°30′47.1″E	2014 AFC Challenge Cup is located in Maldives
Capacity: 13,000 (renovated)	2014 AFC Challenge Cup is located in Maldives
Addu City, Addu Atoll	2014 AFC Challenge Cup is located in Maldives
Addu Football Stadium	2014 AFC Challenge Cup is located in Maldives
0°38′28.68″S 73°8′28.8″E	2014 AFC Challenge Cup is located in Maldives
Capacity: 5,000 (renovated)	2014 AFC Challenge Cup is located in Maldives

== Qualification ==
The qualification draw was held on 11 December 2012 in AFC House in Kuala Lumpur, Malaysia. The twenty teams involved in the qualification draw were drawn into five groups of four teams. The five group winners plus the two best second-placed teams qualified for the finals. North Korea, the 2010 and 2012 champions, were excluded from participating in the 2014 AFC Challenge Cup.

=== Qualified nations ===
Country	Qualified as	Qualified on	Previous appearances in tournament
Maldives	Hosts	28 November 2012	1 (2012)
Afghanistan	Group C winner	6 March 2013	2 (2006, 2008)
Myanmar	Group A winner	6 March 2013	2 (2008, 2010)
Palestine	Group D winner	6 March 2013	2 (2006, 2012)
Laos	Best runner-up team	21 March 2013	0 (debut)
Kyrgyzstan	Group B winner	21 March 2013	2 (2006, 2010)
Philippines	Group E winner	26 March 2013	2 (2006, 2012)
Turkmenistan	2nd best runner-up team	26 March 2013	3 (2008, 2010, 2012)

== Draw ==
The eight participating teams were drawn into two brackets of the group stage. To prepare for this, the teams were separated into four pots of two teams each based on their performance in the 2012 edition of the tournament with the exception of hosts being placed in Pot 1. The final draw was held at the Paradise Island Resort in the Maldives on 12 February 2014.

Pot 1	Pot 2	Pot 3	Pot 4
Maldives (hosts); Turkmenistan	Philippines; Palestine	Kyrgyzstan; Afghanistan	Laos; Myanmar

== Squads ==
Each team can name a squad of 23 players.

== Group stage ==
=== Tie-breaking criteria ===
The teams are ranked according to points (3 points for a win, 1 point for a tie, 0 points for a loss) and tie breakers are in following order:

1. Greater number of points obtained in the group matches between the teams concerned;
2. Goal difference resulting from the group matches between the teams concerned;
3. Greater number of goals scored in the group matches between the teams concerned;
4. Goal difference in all the group matches;
5. Greater number of goals scored in all the group matches;
6. Kicks from the penalty mark if only two teams are involved and they are both on the field of play;
7. Fewer score calculated according to the number of yellow and red cards received in the group matches; (1 point for each yellow card, 3 points for each red card as a consequence of two yellow cards, 3 points for each direct red card, 4 points for each yellow card followed by a direct red card)
8. Drawing of lots.

Key to colours in group tables
Top two placed teams advance to the semi-finals

- All times UTC+5.

=== Group A ===
Team	Pld	W	D	L	GF	GA	GD	Pts
Palestine	3	2	1	0	3	0	+3	7
Maldives (H)	3	1	1	1	4	3	+1	4
Kyrgyzstan	3	1	0	2	1	3	−2	3
Myanmar	3	1	0	2	3	5	−2	3

Source: RSSSF
(H) Hosts
19 May 2014
16:00

Palestine	1–0	Kyrgyzstan
Abuhabib 90+6'	Report

National Football Stadium, Malé
Attendance: 500
Referee: Yudai Yamamoto (Japan)
19 May 2014
21:00

Maldives	2–3	Myanmar
Umair 55'; Ashfaq 90+6'	Report	Kyaw Ko Ko 39', 90+5'; Nyein Chan Aung 45+1'

National Football Stadium, Malé
Attendance: 8,300
Referee: Abdullah Balideh (Qatar)

21 May 2014
16:00

Myanmar	0–2	Palestine
	Report	Abuhabib 45+4'; Nu'man 50'

National Football Stadium, Malé
Attendance: 600
Referee: Nagor Amir Noor Mohamed (Malaysia)
21 May 2014
21:00

Kyrgyzstan	0–2	Maldives
	Report	Ashfaq 61', 71'

National Football Stadium, Malé
Attendance: 8,000
Referee: Wang Di (China PR)

23 May 2014
21:00

Maldives	0–0	Palestine
	Report

National Football Stadium, Malé
Attendance: 8,300
Referee: Yudai Yamamoto (Japan)
23 May 2014
21:00

Kyrgyzstan	1–0	Myanmar
Verevkin 18'	Report

Addu Football Stadium, Addu City
Attendance: 300
Referee: Ko Hyung-jin (South Korea)

=== Group B ===
Team	Pld	W	D	L	GF	GA	GD	Pts
Philippines	3	2	1	0	4	0	+4	7
Afghanistan	3	1	2	0	3	1	+2	5
Turkmenistan	3	1	0	2	6	6	0	3
Laos	3	0	1	2	1	7	−6	1

Source: RSSSF
20 May 2014
16:00

Turkmenistan	5–1	Laos
Baýramow 42'; Durdyýew 50' (pen.), 85'; Keodouangdeth 55' (o.g.); Hojaahmedow 87'	Report	Sayavutthi 34'

Addu Football Stadium, Addu City
Attendance: 500
Referee: Ko Hyung-jin (South Korea)
20 May 2014
22:00 (Note: Kickoff delayed from 21:00 due to rain.)

Philippines	0–0	Afghanistan
	Report

Addu Football Stadium, Addu City
Attendance: 500
Referee: Valentin Kovalenko (Uzbekistan)

22 May 2014
16:00

Laos	0–2	Philippines
	Report	Rota 41'; Reichelt 63'

Addu Football Stadium, Addu City
Attendance: 300
Referee: Dmitriy Mashentsev (Kyrgyzstan)
22 May 2014
21:00

Afghanistan	3–1	Turkmenistan
Amiri 45+1'; Hatifi 61'; Shayesteh 86'	Report	Muhadow 64'

Addu Football Stadium, Addu City
Attendance: 1,500
Referee: Jameel Abdulhusin (Bahrain)

24 May 2014
16:00

Turkmenistan	0–2	Philippines
	Report	P. Younghusband 49'; Reichelt 73'

National Football Stadium, Malé
Attendance: 500
Referee: Nagor Amir Noor Mohamed (Malaysia)
24 May 2014
16:00

Afghanistan	0–0	Laos
	Report

Addu Football Stadium, Addu City
Attendance: 600
Referee: Valentin Kovalenko (Uzbekistan)

== Knockout stage ==
Semi-finals
27 May
Palestine	2
Afghanistan	0
27 May
Philippines (a.e.t.)	3
Maldives	2

Final
30 May
Palestine	1
Philippines	0
Third place
29 May
Afghanistan	1 (7)
Maldives (p)	1 (8)

=== Semi-finals ===
27 May 2014
15:30

Palestine	2–0	Afghanistan
Nu'man 43' (pen.), 47'	Report

National Football Stadium, Malé
Attendance: 500
Referee: Ko Hyung-jin (South Korea)

27 May 2014
21:00

Philippines	3–2 (a.e.t.)	Maldives
P. Younghusband 19'; Lucena 38'; C. Greatwich 104'	Report	Umair 36'; Abdulla 66'

National Football Stadium, Malé
Attendance: 8,300
Referee: Abdullah Balideh (Qatar)

=== Third place play-off ===
29 May 2014
21:00

Afghanistan	1–1 (a.e.t.)	Maldives
Karimi 114'	Report	Fasir 118'
Penalties
Alikhil (penalty scored); Zazai (penalty scored); Hadid (penalty missed); Karimi (penalty scored); Faqiryar (penalty scored); Sharityar (penalty scored); Daudi (penalty scored); Sakhizada (penalty scored); Shayesteh (penalty missed)	7–8	(penalty scored) Ashfaq; (penalty scored) Abdul Ghanee; (penalty missed) Fasir; (penalty scored) Rilwan; (penalty scored) Qasim; (penalty scored) Rasheed; (penalty scored) Ali; (penalty scored) Mohamed; (penalty scored) Fazeel

National Football Stadium, Malé
Attendance: 6,500
Referee: Dmitriy Mashentsev (Kyrgyzstan)

=== Final ===
30 May 2014
21:00

Palestine	1–0	Philippines
Nu'man 59'	Report

National Football Stadium, Malé
Attendance: 6,300
Referee: Valentin Kovalenko (Uzbekistan)

== Winners ==
2014 AFC Challenge Cup champions

Palestine
First title

== Statistics ==
=== Player awards ===
- Top goalscorer: (Palestine) Ashraf Nu'man
- Most Valuable Player: (Palestine) Murad Ismail
- Best goalkeeper: (Palestine) Ramzi Saleh

=== Goalscorers ===
4 goals

- (Palestine) Ashraf Nu'man

3 goals

- (Maldives) Ali Ashfaq

2 goals

- (Maldives) Mohammad Umair
- (Myanmar) Kyaw Ko Ko
- (Palestine) Abdelhamid Abuhabib
- (Philippines) Patrick Reichelt
- (Philippines) Phil Younghusband
- (Turkmenistan) Didar Durdyýew

1 goal

- (Afghanistan) Zohib Islam Amiri
- (Afghanistan) Ahmad Hatifi
- (Afghanistan) Hamidullah Karimi
- (Afghanistan) Faysal Shayesteh
- (Kyrgyzstan) Vladimir Verevkin
- (Laos) Khampheng Sayavutthi
- (Maldives) Assadhulla Abdulla
- (Maldives) Ali Fasir
- (Myanmar) Nyein Chan Aung
- (Philippines) Chris Greatwich
- (Philippines) Jerry Lucena
- (Philippines) Simone Rota
- (Turkmenistan) Döwlet Baýramow
- (Turkmenistan) Bahtiýar Hojaahmedow
- (Turkmenistan) Süleýman Muhadow

Own goal

- (Laos) Vathana Keodouangdeth (against Turkmenistan)

== Team statistics ==
This table shows all team performance. Matches that ended in a penalty shoot out are counted as draws

Pos	Team	Pld	W	D	L	GF	GA	GD
Reached the knockout stage
1	Palestine	5	4	1	0	6	0	+6
2	Philippines	5	3	1	1	7	3	+4
3	Maldives	5	1	2	2	7	7	0
4	Afghanistan	5	1	3	1	4	4	0
Eliminated in the group stage
5	Turkmenistan	3	1	0	2	6	6	0
6	Myanmar	3	1	0	2	3	5	−2
7	Kyrgyzstan	3	1	0	2	1	3	−2
8	Laos	3	0	1	2	1	7	−6
