= Addu Football Stadium =

Stadium in Maldives

- Interactive map of Addu Football Stadium
- Location: Addu City, Maldives
- Coordinates: 0.615847°S 73.096768°E
- Capacity: 5.000 capacity

The Addu Football Stadium is a sporting stadium in Addu City, Maldives. The stadium went through renovations in 2014 for the hosting of some matches of the 2014 AFC Challenge Cup.
