= Abassin Alikhil =

Afghan footballer

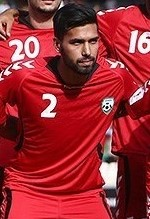

Personal information
- Full name: Abassin Alikhil
- Date of birth: 19 April 1991 (age 35)
- Place of birth: Frankfurt am Main, Germany
- Height: 1.77 m (5 ft 10 in)
- Position: Defensive midfielder

Team information
- Current team: SC Hessen Dreieich
- Number: 8

Youth career
- –1999: SKG Sprendlingen
- 1999–2009: Eintracht Frankfurt

Senior career*
| Years | Team | Apps | (Gls) |
| 2009–2013 | Eintracht Frankfurt II | 74 | (2) |
| 2013–2014 | FSV Frankfurt II | 30 | (3) |
| 2014–2016 | Viktoria Aschaffenburg | 62 | (2) |
| 2016–2022 | SC Hessen Dreieich | 98 | (6) |
| 2022– | Eintracht Frankfurt II | 19 | (2) |

International career^{‡}
| 2011– | Afghanistan | 41 | (0) |
- * Club domestic league appearances and goals as of 1 July 2023 (UTC) ‡ National team caps and goals as of 31 December 2022 (UTC)

Abassin Alikhil (Dari: اباسين علی خیل; born 19 April 1991) is an Afghan professional footballer who plays as a defensive midfielder for the German club SC Hessen Dreieich. He has also played for the Afghanistan national team.
