= Jerry Lucena =

Danish-Filipino footballer (born 1980)

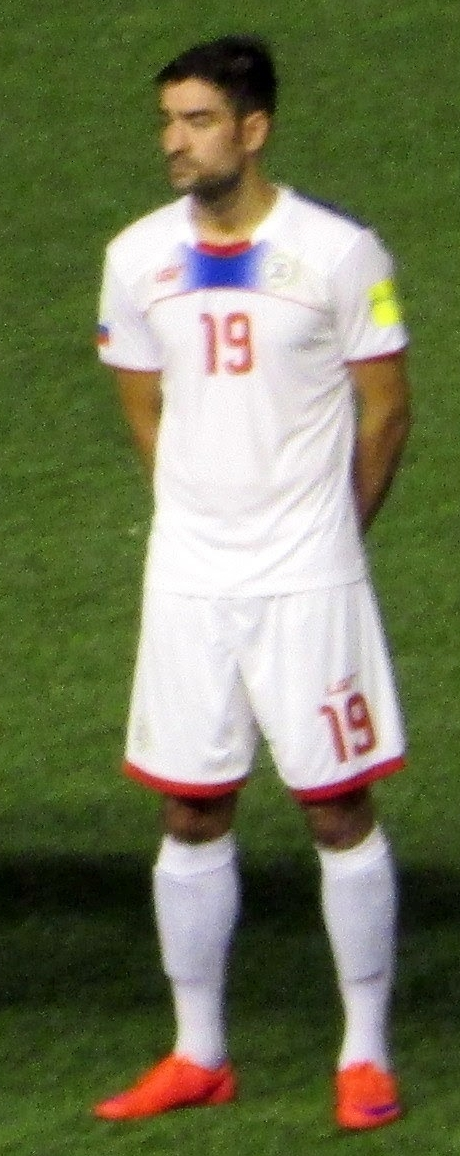
- Lucena with the Philippine national team

Personal information
- Full name: Jerry Ruben Petersen Lucena
- Date of birth: 11 August 1980 (age 46)
- Place of birth: Esbjerg, Denmark
- Height: 1.79 m (5 ft 10 in)
- Positions: Defender; defensive midfielder

Team information
- Current team: Esbjerg fB (Youth coach)

Youth career
- –1999: Esbjerg fB

Senior career*
Years	Team	Apps	(Gls)
1999–2007	Esbjerg fB	182	(4)
2007–2012	AGF	147	(3)
2012–2016	Esbjerg fB	34	(0)
Total		363	(7)

International career
2001	Denmark U-21	2	(0)
2006	Denmark	2	(0)
2011–2015	Philippines	39	(2)

Managerial career
- 2022–: Esbjerg U19
- * Club domestic league appearances and goals

Jerry Ruben Lucena (born 11 August 1980) is a former footballer and currently the manager of the U19 squad of Esbjerg fB.

He has represented the Philippines national football team at international level, having previously featured in the Denmark U-21 and Denmark League XI international teams.

== Club career ==
Lucena started playing for the youth side of Danish football club Esbjerg fB. In 1999, he made his professional debut for Esbjerg in the Danish 1st Division, the second highest football league in the country. Esbjerg won promotion to the top-flight Danish Superliga in 2001. Lucena was a mainstay in the team during the 2002-03 Danish Superliga season, playing of 32 of 33 games as Esbjerg finished 5th and qualified for the European UEFA Cup tournament.

On 14 August 2003, Lucena played his first European game for Esbjerg in the qualifying round of the 2003–04 UEFA Cup. His club won 5–0 against Andorran football club FC Santa Coloma in his debut. Esbjerg would advance to the next round on a 9–1 aggregate result. Lucena played all 33 games, as Esbjerg won bronze medals in the 2003-04 Danish Superliga championship. In 2006, he was part of the Esbjerg team which reached the final of the Danish Cup, but lost to Randers FC. He played a total 245 senior games for Esbjerg, before leaving the club in 2007.

Lucena signed with Superliga rival club AGF Aarhus in 2007, one of the oldest sport clubs in Danish football. Jerry Lucena played full back and occasionally the midfielder position for AGF. When AGF were relegated to the Danish 1st Division in 2010, Lucena stayed with the club. He helped AGF win the 2010–11 Danish 1st Division, getting promotion for the Superliga.

He had the remainder of his AGF contract annulled in June 2012, in order to go back to Esbjerg.

Lucena's contract with Esbjerg end in Summer 2016 when Lucena will be retiring from competitive football as a player. As part of a final agreement with the club, he served as assistant coach to the club's youth team in the U19 League, and is targeting to pass the exam in May 2016 to be a T-trainer enabling him to acquire an A-license, the second highest coaching license in the DBU.

== International career ==
Born to a Filipino father and a Danish mother, Lucena was eligible to represent either side at the international level. Initially, he was called up to represent the Denmark U-21 squad in 2001. In 2006, Lucena again represented Denmark as part of its League XI international football team, which is an unofficial national team assembled by the Danish Football Association to evaluate the level of the best players from the Danish Superliga.

Lucena switched to represent the Philippines in March 2011. On 23 March 2011, he made his international debut for the Philippines national team against the Palestine team in the 2012 AFC Challenge Cup qualifying round. The match ended in a 0–0 draw, but the Philippines would eventually clinch the second spot in their bracket to qualify for the group stage of the 2012 AFC Challenge Cup. On 11 October 2011, Lucena again represented the Philippines in an international friendly match against Nepal, which ended in a 4–0 win for the Philippines.

In November 2012, Lucena is part of the Philippine team in the Group A stage of the 2012 AFF Suzuki Cup, the football championship cup for Southeast Asia. The Philippines finished second in the group with 2 wins and 1 loss record, qualifying them to semi finals versus Singapore. Lucena was instrumental in the Philippine squad defense wherein he played in two games : Thailand 2–1 Philippines and Vietnam 0–1 Philippines. Lucena will once again reprise his role in the midfield in the second leg of the 2012 AFF Suzuki Cup Semi-finals against Singapore.

=== Retirement ===
It was reported on March 15, 2016, that Lucena has informed the Philippine Football Federation his retirement from international football due to recurring injury issues. He would have played the last two 2018 FIFA World Cup qualifiers matches of the Philippines against North Korea and Uzbekistan. Lucena spent his time with the Philippine national team as a means to connect with his second homeland especially after the death of his Filipino father.

== Career statistics ==
=== International ===
Appearances and goals by national team and year
National team	Year	Apps	Goals
Denmark	2006	2	0
Denmark	Total	2	0
Philippines	2011	4	0
Philippines	2012	9	0
Philippines	2013	6	0
Philippines	2014	12	1
Philippines	2015	8	1
Philippines	Total	39	2

Scores and results list the Philippines' goal tally first, score column indicates score after each Lucena goal.

List of international goals scored by Jerry Lucena
No.	Date	Venue	Opponent	Score	Result	Competition
1	27 May 2014	National Football Stadium, Malé, Maldives	Maldives	2–1	3–2	2014 AFC Challenge Cup
2	3 September 2015	Rizal Memorial Stadium, Manila, Philippines	Maldives	2–0	2–0	Friendly

== Personal life ==
Lucena has a son, Julius (b. 2008), who also went on to play football in the youth sector of Esbjerg fB.

== Honours ==
=== Club ===
Esbjerg fB

- Danish Cup: 2013

=== National team ===
- Philippine Peace Cup: 2013
- AFC Challenge Cup: Runner-up 2014
