= Zamir Daudi =

Afghan footballer

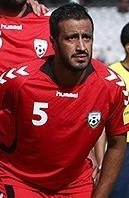
- Daudi before match with Japan, 2018 FIFA World Cup qualification in Tehran

Personal information
- Date of birth: 5 August 1987 (age 39)
- Place of birth: Frankfurt am Main, Germany
- Height: 1.78 m (5 ft 10 in)
- Position: Defender

Team information
- Current team: Viktoria Aschaffenburg
- Number: 13

Youth career
- 2003–2004: Mainz
- 2004–2006: Rot-Weiss Essen

Senior career*
Years	Team	Apps	(Gls)
2007–2008	Germania Ober-Roden	7	(0)
2008	SV Wehen Wiesbaden ll	0	(0)
2009	SG Mündersbach		
2009–2010	Germania Ober-Roden	19	(0)
2010–2011	1.FC Eschborn	5	(0)
2011–2012	SG Rot-Weiß Frankfurt	30	(0)
2012–2014	TGM SV Jügesheim	56	(0)
2014–	Viktoria Aschaffenburg	18	(0)

International career^{‡}
2014–	Afghanistan	10	(0)
- * Club domestic league appearances and goals as of 12 January 2015 ‡ National team caps and goals as of June 07, 2014

Zamir Daudi (born 5 August 1987) is an Afghan footballer who plays as a defender who is currently playing for Viktoria Aschaffenburg.

== Youth ==
Daudi played in the youth of 1.FSV Mainz 05 and Rot-Weiss Essen.

== Career ==
Currently Daudi is playing for Regionalliga Bayern club Viktoria Aschaffenburg. The position that he plays on the field is right back but he also can play central defender and on the midfield.

== International career ==
Daudi made his debut for the national team of Afghanistan during the AFC Challenge Cup 2014 in Maldives. He played all 4 matches as right defender. He wears shirtnumber 5.
