= Hussam Abu Saleh =

Palestinian footballer (born 1982)

Personal information
- Full name: Hussam Abu Saleh
- Date of birth: 9 May 1982 (age 44)
- Place of birth: Sakhnin, Israel
- Height: 5 ft 8 in (1.73 m)
- Position: Wing back

Team information
- Current team: Hapoel Iksal
- Number: 18

Youth career
- 1994–1999: Bnei Sakhnin

Senior career*
Years	Team	Apps	(Gls)
1999–2006	Bnei Sakhnin	119	(35)
2006–2007	Maccabi Kafr Kanna	31	(7)
2007–2009	Maccabi Ironi Tamra	49	(9)
2009–2015	Hilal Al-Quds	52	(3)
2015–2016	Ihud Bnei Majd al-Krum	24	(0)
2016–2019	Hapoel Iksal	10	(0)

International career^{‡}
2008–2015	Palestine	47	(3)
- * Club domestic league appearances and goals as of 8 December 2016 ‡ National team caps and goals as of 16 January 2015

Hussam Abu Saleh (Arabic: حُسَام أَبُو صَالِح, Hebrew: חוסאם אבו סאלח; born 9 May 1982) is a retired footballer who played as a full back and winger. Born in Israel, he played for the Palestine national team.

== Club career ==
Hussam Abu Saleh is one of many Arab Israeli footballers playing their trade in the West Bank Premier League. Abu Saleh started his professional career with his hometown club Bnei Sakhnin F.C. He was part of a generation of players coached by Azmi Nassar that secured promotion to the Israeli Premier League, won the Israel State Cup, and participated in the qualifying rounds of the UEFA Cup.

Abu Saleh left Bnei Sakhnin in 2006 to join up with Nassar at Maccabi Kafr Kanna F.C., he scored 7 goals before moving the following season to Maccabi Ironi Tamra F.C. where he played alongside future Hilal Al-Quds teammate Haitham Dheeb. He joined Hilal Al-Quds in 2009 and was part of the side that won the 2011–12 Palestine Cup.

== International career ==
He received his first call up to the Palestine in 2010 against Sudan. He has since played for Palestine at the 2010 WAFF Championship, 2012 AFC Challenge Cup qualification, 2014 FIFA World Cup qualifying and the 2015 AFC Asian Cup.

=== International goals ===
Scores and results list the Palestine's goal tally first.

#	Date	Venue	Opponent	Score	Result	Competition
	29 February 2012	The Sevens Stadium, Dubai	Azerbaijan	1–0	2–0	Unofficial Friendly
1.	28 June 2012	King Fahd Stadium, Ta'if	Saudi Arabia	1–1	2–2	2012 Arab Nations Cup
2.	20 November 2012	Amman International Stadium, Amman	Syria	2–0	2–1	Friendly
3.	6 February 2013	Jawaharlal Nehru Stadium, Kochi	India	2–2	4–2	Friendly

== Honours ==
=== National team ===
- AFC Challenge Cup: 2014
