= Döwlet Baýramow =

Turkmenistani footballer

Personal information
- Date of birth: 8 August 1982 (age 44)
- Place of birth: Turkmenistan
- Position: Midfielder

Team information
- Current team: Merw Mary

Senior career*
Years	Team	Apps	(Gls)
- Merw Mary

International career^{‡}
2004–	Turkmenistan	4	(1)
- * Club domestic league appearances and goals ‡ National team caps and goals as of 28 January 2012

Döwlet Baýramow (born 8 August 1982) is a Turkmenistani footballer who plays as a midfielder for Merw Mary.

== International career ==
He is a member of the Turkmenistan national football team.
