= Abdelhamid Abuhabib =

Palestinian footballer

Personal information
- Date of birth: 6 August 1989 (age 37)
- Place of birth: Khan Younis, Palestine
- Height: 1.72 m (5 ft 8 in)
- Position: Attacking midfielder

Team information
- Current team: Shabab Al-Khaleel
- Number: 19

Youth career
- 2000–2005: Shabab Khan Younis

Senior career*
Years	Team	Apps	(Gls)
2005–2009	Shabab Khan Younis		
2009–2012	Merkaz Balata		(27)
2012–2013	Shabab Al-Khaleel		(1)
2013-2018	Markaz Balata		
2018-2019	Shabab Al-Khaleel		
2019-2020	Al-Quwat Al-Falastiniya		
2020-2022	Al-Ama'ari		
2022-	Markaz Balata		

International career
2009–2013	Palestine U23	6	(1)
2012–2018	Palestine	35	(7)
- * Club domestic league appearances and goals as of June 06, 2014

Abdelhamid Abuhabib (Arabic: عبد الحميد أبو حبيب; born 6 August 1989) is a Palestinian footballer currently playing for Hebron-based Shabab Al-Khaleel of the West Bank Premier League.

== Early years ==
Abuhabeeb grew up playing football in the streets of Khan Younis from an early age.

== Club career ==
=== Merkaz Balata ===
Like many other Gazan footballers, Abuhabib went to the West Bank in search of more steady league play as the Gazan league had been victim of political turmoil. He signed with Merkaz Shabab Balata in 2009 and was able to secure an exit visa to travel to the West Bank. Upon his arrival, he was surprised to learn that he had not signed with a top-tier side, but with a side playing in the second division. Abuhabib had a fantastic first season with Balata, scoring 9 goals and helping them earn promotion to the West Bank Premier League. His sublime skill caught the eye of the more established Shabab Al-Khaleel whom he signed with but voided the contract over undisclosed disputes. In 2010, Abuhabib signed a one-year deal keeping him in Nablus with Balata.

His second season with the club would prove to be even more spectacular. In the league, Abuhabib scored 12 goals in 22 matches helping power the newly promoted side to fourth place in the 12-team league. He also turned in numerous man of the match performances in the Palestinian FA Cup scoring 8 goals in 8 games helping Balata reach the final where they lost to Hilal Al-Quds. In Abuhabib's first season in the Palestinian top flight he had 22 goals in the three competitions (12 league goals, 8 FA Cup goals, 2 Yasser Arafat Cup goals). He once again opted to extend his contract for an added year at the end of the season. He moved to Shabab Al-Khaleel at the end of the 2011–12 season.

== International career ==
Abuhabib received his first call-up to the Olympic team in 2009 to face Tunisia. He played a pivotal role in Palestine's attempt to qualify for the 2012 Summer Olympics in London. Abuhabib also played in the next round against Bahrain helping Palestine win 0–1 in Manama. Palestine would eventually go out on away goals falling short of 3rd round of Olympic Qualifying.

Abuhabib made his debut as a late substitute in an October 2011 friendly against Iran. He scored his first and second goals in the 2012 AFC Challenge Cup third place playoff against the Philippines.

=== International goals ===
==== Senior team ====
Scores and results list the Palestine's goal tally first.

#	Date	Venue	Opponent	Score	Result	Competition
1.	19 March 2011	Dasarath Rangasala Stadium, Kathmandu, Nepal	Philippines	1–1	3–4	2012 AFC Challenge Cup
2.	19 March 2011	Dasarath Rangasala Stadium, Kathmandu, Nepal	Philippines	2–3	3–4	2012 AFC Challenge Cup
3.	4 March 2013	Dasarath Rangasala Stadium, Kathmandu, Nepal	Northern Mariana Islands	2–0	9–0	2014 AFC Challenge Cup qualifier
4.	4 March 2013	Dasarath Rangasala Stadium, Kathmandu, Nepal	Northern Mariana Islands	4–0	9–0	2014 AFC Challenge Cup qualifier
5.	19 May 2014	National Football Stadium, Malé, Maldives	Kyrgyzstan	1–0	1–0	2014 AFC Challenge Cup
6.	21 May 2014	National Football Stadium, Malé, Maldives	Myanmar	1–0	2–0	2014 AFC Challenge Cup
7.	6 September 2014	Rizal Memorial Stadium, Manila, Philippines	Chinese Taipei	3–3	7–3	2014 Philippine Peace Cup
8.	9 November 2014	Mỹ Đình National Stadium, Hanoi, Vietnam	Vietnam	1–0	3–1	Friendly

=== Olympic team ===
Scores and results list the Palestine's goal tally first.

#	Date	Venue	Opponent	Score	Result	Competition
1.	9 March 2011	Faisal Al-Husseini International Stadium, Al-Ram	Thailand	1–0	1–0	2012 Summer Olympics qualifier

== Honours ==
=== National team ===
- AFC Challenge Cup: 2014
