= Şöhrat Söýünow =

Turkmen footballer

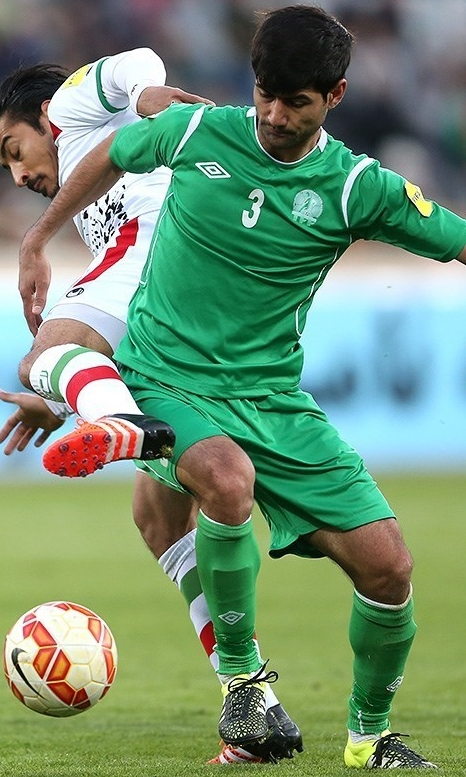
- Söýünow with Turkmenistan in 2015

Personal information
- Full name: Şöhrat Agamyradowiç Söýünow
- Date of birth: March 8, 1992 (age 34)
- Place of birth: Garaşsyzlyk District, Lebap, Turkmenistan
- Height: 1.84 m (6 ft 1/2 in)
- Position: Center back

Team information
- Current team: Ahal

Senior career*
Years	Team	Apps	(Gls)
2010–2014	HTTU		
2015–2018	Altyn Asyr	?	(?)
2019	Ahal	?	(?)
2020	PDRM FA	11	(0)
2021-	Ahal	0	(0)

International career^{‡}
2011–	Turkmenistan	32	(0)
- * Club domestic league appearances and goals as of April 24, 2021 ‡ National team caps and goals as of 29 March 2017

Shohrat Agamyradovich Soyunov (Turkmen: Şöhrat Agamyradowiç Söýünow; born 8 March 1992) is a Turkmen professional footballer currently playing for FC Ahal in the Ýokary Liga. He is member of the Turkmenistan national team. He plays as a centre-back.

== Career ==
=== Club ===
He began his career at HTTU Aşgabat. With team won the 2014 AFC President's Cup.

In 2015, he moved to the FC Altyn Asyr. In 2016, he was recognized as the best player in the championship of Turkmenistan.

In 2019, he signed contract with FC Ahal.

In 2020 he moved to the championship of Malaysia. This is his first foreign club in his career. On 1 March 2020, Soyunov made his debut in the 2020 Malaysia Super League in a 0–0 draw against Sabah FA.

On 30 March 2021, it was announced that Söýünow signed a deal with FC Ahal, moving on a free transfer.

=== International ===
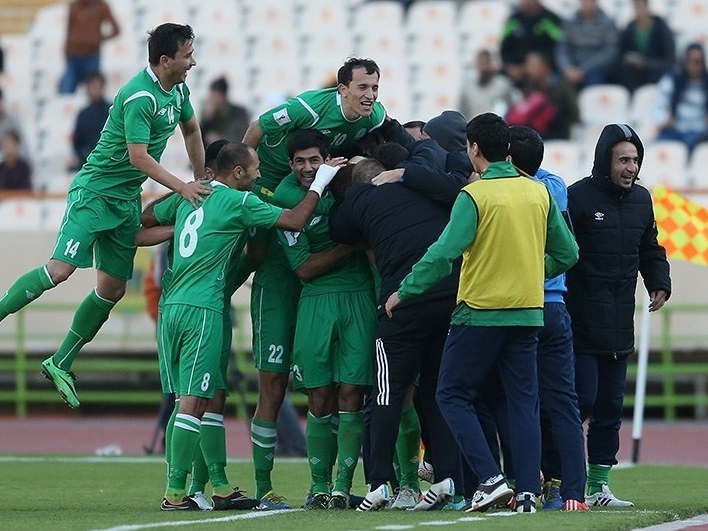
Turkmenistan in World Cup Qualifying

Soyunov made his senior national team debut on 23 March 2011, in a 2012 AFC Challenge Cup qualification match against Taiwan.

He played for Turkmenistan U22 in 2013 Commonwealth of Independent States Cup.

== Career statistics ==
=== International ===
Turkmenistan national team
Year	Apps	Goals
2011	2	0
2012	7	0
2013	2	0
2014	2	0
2015	8	0
2016	2	0
2017	1	0
Total	24	0

Statistics accurate as of match played 26 March 2017

== Honors ==
Turkmenistan

- AFC Challenge Cup: Runners-up 2012

FC HTTU

- AFC President's Cup: 2014

FC Altyn Asyr

- Ýokary Liga: 2015, 2016, 2017, 2018
