= Murad Ismail (footballer) =

Association football player from Palestine

Murad Ismail Said
Personal information
- Date of birth: 15 December 1982 (age 43)
- Place of birth: Palestine
- Position: Defensive midfielder

Senior career*
Years	Team	Apps	(Gls)
2009–2011	Al-Ahly		
2011–2013	Hilal Al-Quds		
2013–2014	Al-Wehdat	14	(0)

International career^{‡}
2010–2015	Palestine	29	(1)
- * Club domestic league appearances and goals as of June 06, 2014 ‡ National team caps and goals as of January 16, 2015

Murad Ismail Said (Arabic: مراد إسماعيل; born 15 December 1982) is a Palestinian professional footballer who played as a defensive midfielder for Al-Wehdat in the Jordan Premier League and the Palestine national football team.

After his performance for his country in the AFC Challenge Cup, Said was named the tournament's most-valuable-player as he led Palestine to qualification for the 2015 AFC Asian Cup.

== Honours ==
=== Palestine ===
- AFC Challenge Cup (1): 2014

=== Al-Wehdat ===
- Jordan League : 2013–14
- Jordan FA Cup : 2013–14

=== Hilal Al-Quds ===
- West Bank Premier League : 2011–12

=== Individual ===
- 2014 AFC Challenge Cup Most Valuable Player.
