= Khader Yousef =

Palestinian footballer

Khader Youssef
Personal information
- Date of birth: 6 October 1984 (age 42)
- Place of birth: Bethlehem, Palestine
- Height: 1.78 m (5 ft 10 in)
- Position: Midfielder

Team information
- Current team: Wadi Al-Nes
- Number: 10

Youth career
- Wadi Al-Nes

Senior career*
Years	Team	Apps	(Gls)
2004–	Wadi Al-Nes	167	(10)
2013	→ Al-Faisaly (loan)	7	(2)

International career^{‡}
2008–2016	Palestine	64	(2)
- * Club domestic league appearances and goals as of 6 June 2014 ‡ National team caps and goals as of 20 November 2019

Khader Yousef Abu Hammad (Arabic: خَضِر يُوسُف أَبُو حَمَّاد; born 6 October 1984) is a Palestinian footballer playing for Tarji Wadi Al-Nes of the West Bank Premier League as a midfielder.

He received his first national team cap for Palestine in 2008 against Jordan. He has since played for Palestine at the 2010 West Asian Football Federation Championship, the qualifying rounds of the 2010 Challenge Cup, 2012 AFC Challenge Cup, and in 2014 World Cup qualifying.

== International career ==
=== International goals ===
Scores and results list Palestine's goal tally first.

Goal	Date	Venue	Opponent	Score	Result	Competition
1.	6 October 2014	Kanchenjunga Stadium, Siliguri, India	India	3–2	3–2	Friendly
2.	16 June 2015	Bukit Jalil National Stadium, Kuala Lumpur, Malaysia	Malaysia	4–0	6–0	2018 FIFA World Cup qualification
