= Ramzi Saleh =

Palestinian footballer (born 1980)

Personal information
- Full name: Ramzi Soliman Ahmed Saleh
- Date of birth: 8 August 1980 (age 46)
- Place of birth: Cairo, Egypt
- Height: 1.87 m (6 ft 2 in)
- Position: Goalkeeper

Youth career
- Ittihad Jeddah

Senior career*
Years	Team	Apps	(Gls)
1999–2008	Shabab Jabalia	12	(0)
2008–2010	Al-Ahly	15	(0)
2010–2011	Al-Merreikh	22	(0)
2011–2013	Smouha	19	(0)
2013–2014	Misr El-Makasa	3	(0)
2014–2015	Alassiouty	6	(0)
2015–2017	Al-Masry	29	(0)
2018–2019	El Gouna	0	(0)

International career
1998–2002	Palestine U23	26	(0)
2000–2015	Palestine	68	(0)
- * Club domestic league appearances and goals as of 30 January 2020

Ramzi Soliman Ahmed Saleh (Arabic: رَمْزِيّ سُلَيْمَان أَحْمَد صَالِح; born 8 August 1980) is a former footballer who played as a goalkeeper. Born in Egypt, he played for the Palestine national team.

He is the most capped player for Palestine at international level. Saleh participated in every single FIFA World Cup qualification campaign for Palestine (2002–2014) until injury prevented him for playing against Afghanistan and Thailand in the preliminary rounds of 2014 World Cup qualification.

== Early years ==
Ramzi Saleh was born in Cairo, Egypt to Palestinian father and Egyptian mother, but emigrated to Saudi Arabia in 1990. He was raised in the city of Jeddah and started to play for local club Al-Ittihad at youth level. However, Ramzi stated that he did not have a Saudi passport while he was in Saudi Arabia. He returned to the Gaza Strip with his family when his father retired. Ramzi signed with Shabab Jabalia in 1999.

== Club career ==
=== Move to Al-Ahly ===
After being awarded a 3-day trial with Egyptian footballing giants Al-Ahly, Shabab Jabalia, in a show of good faith, released him without demanding a transfer fee. After months of playing second fiddle and no official appearances he was awarded the starting job for Al-Ahly after a series of mistakes by incumbent Amir Abdelhamid. He made his first appearance against Ismaily in a 0–1 loss on the 20th Matchday of the 2008/09 season. In the following match, a 2–2 draw with Petrol Asyut, Saleh put in a match of the man performance helping Al-Ahly salvage a point The 2008/09 season ended with Ramzi Saleh helping Al-Ahly to another league title after defeating Ismaily 1–0 in a playoff.

After suffering an injury before the 2009–10 season, Saleh was replaced by Ahmed Adel. In the winter transfer window, manager Hossam Al-Badry brought in Sherif Ekramy to fill the post. At the end of the season, Saleh elected to leave the club on a bosman.

=== Al-Merrikh ===
At the start of the 2009–10 season, Ramzi Saleh was injured and missed all of the preseason with Al-Ahly. As a result, he was replaced by Al-Ahly youth team player Ahmed Adel Abd El-Moneam. During the winter transfer window, Al-Ahly acquired Sherif Ekramy relegating Ramzi Saleh to third choice goalkeeper. After Saleh decided to leave Al-Ahly, it was thought that he would be included in the transfer that brought Geddo to the Red Castle, but negotiations fell through at the final moment and he was excluded from the deal. While on National Team duty in Sudan Saleh was approached by Al-Merreikh President Gamal Al-Wali to play for the Sudanese side. With no other offers on the table Saleh agreed to sign for the Red Devils in principle. His time with Al-Merreikh was marked by inconsistency and injury. After a three-week layoff, Saleh returned to Al-Merreikh's starting lineup to face Al-Hilal in the decisive encounter of the season. Al-Merrikh would lose the game 3–1 with Saleh being booed by his own fans.

In the off-season, Al-Merreikh brought in Ramzi Saleh's former Al-Ahly manager Hossam Al-Badry with Saleh playing a key role in facilitating the transaction. Despite this, Al-Badry chose to buy Essam El-Hadary from Zamalek. Al-Merreikh released Ramzi Saleh from his contract.

=== Smouha ===
On 18 December 2010, Zamalek announced a two-and-a-half-year deal with the Palestinian goalkeeper.. The deal broke down days later after the two sides failed to agree on a financial compensation package.

On 4 January 2010, Ramzi Saleh signed an 18-month contract with Haras El-Hodood. However, days later the deal was broken, also due to financial issues, the player later revealed that his two contracts were terminated due to his former agent sending messages to the two clubs warning them about an injury that Saleh sustained in 1998 that still affects his performance. He later thanked Haras El-Hodood management for being honest with him and Zamalek management for refusing to give away information about his injury so that they will not jeopardize his future.

Ramzi Saleh elected to operate on his ACL in order to clear up any concerns potential clubs may have signing him. The operation was conducted in Germany in February 2011. As a result of the surgery, Saleh missed the rest of the 2010–11 season as well as 2014 FIFA World Cup qualification matches against Afghanistan and Thailand. On 28 July 2011 it was announced that Saleh had agreed to a 3-year contract with Smouha worth 2 million Egyptian Pounds.
