= Taraji Wadi Al-Nes =

- Full name: Taraji Wadi Al-Nes Sports Club
- Founded: 1984
- Ground: Wadi Al-Nes
- Manager: Ashraf Nu'man
- League: West Bank Premier League
- 2018–19: 6th

Taraji Wadi Al-Nes Sports Club (Arabic: نادي ترجي واد النيص الرياضي) or simply Taraji Wadi Al-Nes is a Palestinian football team, based in the town of Wadi Al-Nes outside of Bethlehem. It plays in the West Bank Premier League.

== Achievements ==
- West Bank League
  - Champions (2): 2008–09, 2013–14
- West Bank First League
  - Champions (1): 1998–99
- West Bank Cup
  - Champions (1): 2007–08, 2009–10
- West Bank Football League Cup
  - Champions (2): 2010, 2010–11
  - Runners-up (2): 2007, 2013–14
- West Bank Super Cup
  - Champions (1): 2010

== Twinning ==
- Espérance Sportive de Tunis (Tunisian Club)
