= Shabab Al-Khaleel SC =

Palestinian Football club

- Full name: Shabab Al-Khaleel Sports Club
- Nickname: Al-Ameed
- Founded: 1943; 83 years ago
- Ground: Dura International Stadium, Dora
- Capacity: 18,000
- Chairman: Mithqal Al-Jaabari
- Manager: Abdullah Al-Saidawi
- League: West Bank Premier League
- 2022–23: WBPL, 3rd
- Website: www.shababclub.ps

Shabab Al-Khaleel Sports Club (Arabic: نادي شباب الخليل الرياضي), or simply Shabab Al-Khaleel, is a Palestinian professional football club. Based in the city of Hebron, they play in the West Bank Premier League.

== Honours ==
- West Bank League (7)
  - Champions (6): 1979, 1982, 1986, 1999, 2016, 2021, 2022
  - Runners-up (2): 2012, 2019
- West Bank Cup
  - Winners (4): 1978, 1981, 1985, 2013
  - Runners-up (4): 2000, 2008, 2010, 2017
- West Bank Super Cup
  - Winners (1): 2013
  - Runners-up (1): 2016
- Yasser Arafat Cup - Northern Provinces
  - Winners (2): 2013–14, 2016–17
  - Runners-up (1): 2015–16

=== Juniors ===
- Tokyo League
  - Winners (1): 2019

== Performance in AFC competitions ==
- AFC Cup: 1 Appearance

2017: Play-off round

== Continental record ==
Season	Competition	Round	Club	Home	Away	Aggregate
2017	AFC Cup	Play-off round	(Oman) Al-Suwaiq	2–1	3–1	3–4
2022	AFC Cup	Group B	(Oman) Dhofar			
2022	AFC Cup	Group B	(Kuwait) Al-Arabi			
2022	AFC Cup	Group B	(Bahrain) Al-Riffa			

== Current squad ==
As of 9 June 2024

Note: Flags indicate national team as defined under FIFA eligibility rules; some limited exceptions apply. Players may hold more than one non-FIFA nationality.

No.	Pos.	Nation	Player
2	GK	PLE	Islam Yaghmour
3	DF	PLE	Ahmed Odeh Issa
4	DF	PLE	Yazan Iwaiwi
5	MF	PLE	Yousef Al-Sarsour
6	MF	PLE	Mohammed Ayob
8	MF	PLE	Feras Nu'man
9	MF	PLE	Shahee taweel
11	MF	PLE	Yahya Abu Fara
12	MF	PLE	Rashed Al-Mohtasib
13	DF	PLE	Mazen Abu Khalaf
14	MF	PLE	Mahdi Jamjoun
15	GK	PLE	Abdulsamad Abu Sonaina
16	MF	PLE	Abdullah Abu Srour

No.	Pos.	Nation	Player
17	MF	PLE	Reyad Adawi
18	MF	PLE	Hasan Thawabteh
20	MF	PLE	Ahmad Al-Sheikh
22	MF	PLE	Mohammed Na'eem
23	MF	PLE	Mohammed Ali Jaafreh
30	GK	PLE	Mohammed Eshbair
32	MF	PLE	Zaid Altarawa
35	GK	PLE	Mohammed Abu Shaqra
70	FW	PLE	Sari Jadailah
80	FW	PLE	Mohammed Al Badawi
91	DF	ISR	Hassan Manna
99	DF	PLE	Ali Altamra
