= 2015 AFC Asian Cup Group D =

Football tournament group stage

Group D of the 2015 AFC Asian Cup was one of four groups of nations competing at the 2015 AFC Asian Cup. The group's first round of matches were played on 12 January, the second round on 16 January, and the final round on 20 January. All six group matches were played at venues in Australia. The group consisted of title holders Japan, Jordan, Iraq and Palestine. Japan and Iraq advanced as group winners and runners-up respectively, while Jordan and Palestine were eliminated.

== Teams ==
Draw position	Team	Method of qualification	Date of qualification	Finals appearance	Last appearance	Previous best performance	FIFA Rankings	
Draw position	Team	Method of qualification	Date of qualification	Finals appearance	Last appearance	Previous best performance	March 2014 (Note: The rankings of March 2014 were used for seeding for the final draw.)	Start of event
D1	Japan	2011 AFC Asian Cup winners	25 January 2011	8th	2011	Winners (1992, 2000, 2004, 2011)	48	54
D2	Jordan	Group A runners-up	4 February 2014	3rd	2011	Quarter-finals (2004, 2011)	66	93
D3	Iraq	Group C runners-up	5 March 2014	8th	2011	Winners (2007)	103	114
D4	Palestine	2014 AFC Challenge Cup winners	30 May 2014	1st	—	—	167	115

== Standings ==
Pos	Team	Pld	W	D	L	GF	GA	GD	Pts	Qualification
1	Japan	3	3	0	0	7	0	+7	9	Advance to knockout stage
2	Iraq	3	2	0	1	3	1	+2	6	Advance to knockout stage
3	Jordan	3	1	0	2	5	4	+1	3	
4	Palestine	3	0	0	3	1	11	−10	0	

Source: Asian Cup Australia 2015
Rules for classification: Tiebreakers

In the quarter-finals:

- Japan advanced to play United Arab Emirates (runner-up of Group C).
- Iraq advanced to play Iran (winner of Group C).

== Matches ==
=== Japan vs Palestine ===
Japan kicked off the defence of their AFC Asian Cup title as Javier Aguirre's side notched up an empathic 4–0 win over tournament debutants and rivals Palestine at Newcastle Stadium. Yasuhito Endō, Shinji Okazaki, Keisuke Honda and Maya Yoshida were all on the scorer as the four-time continental champions showed their class to pick up all three points on a blustery evening.

Palestine, appearing in the competition for the first time after winning the AFC Challenge Cup in May 2014, finished the game with 10 men after Ahmed Harbi was sent-off for a late challenge on Shinji Kagawa that earned him a second booking after being cautioned in first half injury time. Aguirre made his intentions clear from the start by fielding a full strength line-up against Palestine and it took just eight minutes for the defending champions to notch their opening goal. Endo, earning his 149th cap for his country and making a Japanese record 18th appearance at the AFC Asian Cup, took aim from 25 yards out and his low left foot strike gave Ramzi Saleh little chance as it settled into the goalkeeper's bottom right corner. By the 25th minute, Japan had doubled their lead with Okazaki showing razor sharp reflexes to head Kagawa's shot from the edge of the area past Saleh. And just a minute before the half-time break Honda made it 3-0 from the penalty spot after Kagawa was brought down by Mus'ab Al-Batat. Palestine saw little of the ball in the opening 45 minutes, although Ismail Al-Amour fashioned a rare opportunity five minutes before the break, only to drag his effort from the edge of the area across the face of goal.

There was little let-up from Japan at the beginning of the second half with Endo trying his luck again from long distance – this time with his right foot – but Saleh was equal to the task, turning the ball around his right post. Seconds later, though, Yoshida headed home Japan's fourth, rising highest to nod in Kagawa's corner as the gulf in class between the teams became ever more apparent. Mahajna's sending off threatened to cause further problems for Palestine but, despite being down to 10 men, central defender Abdelatif Bahdari almost claimed a consolation goal eight minutes from time when his flying header went just wide. Gōtoku Sakai and Yoshinori Muto both tried their luck in the dying minutes to extend Japan's lead, but in the end the titleholders commenced their defence of the trophy in a convincing manner.

12 January 2015
18:00 AEDT (UTC+11)

Japan	4–0	Palestine
Endō 8'; Okazaki 25'; Honda 43' (pen.); Yoshida 49'	Report

Newcastle Stadium, Newcastle
Attendance: 17,147
Referee: Abdulrahman Abdou (Qatar)

Japan	Palestine

GK	1	Eiji Kawashima
RB	21	Gōtoku Sakai
CB	22	Maya Yoshida
CB	6	Masato Morishige
LB	5	Yuto Nagatomo
DM	17	Makoto Hasebe (c)
RM	4	Keisuke Honda
CM	10	Shinji Kagawa
CM	7	Yasuhito Endō	(substituted off) 58'
LM	18	Takashi Inui	(substituted off) 46'
CF	9	Shinji Okazaki	(substituted off) 80'
Substitutions:
MF	8	Hiroshi Kiyotake	(substituted on) 46'
MF	14	Yoshinori Muto	(substituted on) 58'
FW	11	Yohei Toyoda	(substituted on) 80'
Manager:
(Mexico) Javier Aguirre

GK	21	Ramzi Saleh (c)
RB	18	Mus'ab Al-Batat
CB	4	Ahmed Harbi	(yellow card) 45+1' (yellow-red card) 73'
CB	15	Abdelatif Bahdari	(yellow card) 69'
LB	14	Abdullah Jaber
CM	20	Khader Yousef		(substituted off) 70'
CM	23	Murad Ismail Said
RW	10	Ismail Al-Amour	(yellow card) 60'	(substituted off) 82'
LW	7	Ashraf Nu'man	(yellow card) 43'
SS	19	Abdelhamid Abuhabib
CF	16	Mahmoud Eid		(substituted off) 75'
Substitutions:
MF	8	Hesham Salhe		(substituted on) 70'
DF	12	Tamer Salah		(substituted on) 75'
DF	3	Hussam Abu Saleh		(substituted on) 82'
Manager:
Ahmed Al Hassan

Man of the Match:

- Shinji Okazaki (Japan)

Assistant referees:

- Taleb Salem Al-Marri (Qatar)
- Ramzan Saeed Al-Naemi (Qatar)

Fourth official:

- Mohd Amirul Izwan (Malaysia)

Fifth official:

- Mohd Yusri Muhamad (Malaysia)

=== Jordan vs Iraq ===
Yaser Kasim scored a late winner as 2007 AFC Asian Cup champions Iraq produced a gritty 1–0 victory over 10-man Jordan at Brisbane Stadium to move level on points with Japan, and also became the first ever group stage loss of Jordanian team. Kasim struck with 13 minutes remaining in the crucial meeting between the Arab rivals ahead of their clash with Japan on 16 January. But while Iraq had more of the possession by a comfortable margin, both sides were starved for clear-cut chances in the opening half. Iraq thought they had created a chance in the 16th minute when Kasim picked out Younis Mahmoud, but Tareq Khattab came to the rescue by snuffing out the iconic striker with a sliding tackle.

Jordan coach Ray Wilkins had said a day earlier that if his team failed to qualify for the quarter-finals it would not be because of a lack of effort, and his troops proved the former Manchester United and Chelsea midfielder right with an industrious performance right down to the final whistle. But equally, Jordan struggled over the last third of the pitch, missing that touch of creativity necessary to penetrate Iraq's defense as striker Odai Al-Saify was free in front of goal a minute before the hour mark only to float a back-header over the crossbar. During the following sequence, Mohammad Mustafa had another chance for Jordan from the heart of the penalty area, but mishit the ball, shooting harmlessly into the arms of goalkeeper Jalal Hasan.

But just when a draw appeared to be on the horizon, Iraq put an end to the stalemate in the 77th minute through Kasim, who slashed his way into the penalty area from right angle before pulling the trigger and seeing his shot deflected off Khattab to wrong-foot goalkeeper Amer Shafi. The momentum continued to swing in Iraq's favor as in the 84th minute Jordan defender Anas Bani Yaseen was given his marching orders after collecting a second booking for a late shoulder charge on Saad Abdul-Amir.

12 January 2015
19:00 AEST (UTC+10)

Jordan	0–1	Iraq
	Report	Kasim 77'

Brisbane Stadium, Brisbane
Attendance: 6,840
Referee: Fahad Al-Mirdasi (Saudi Arabia)

Jordan	Iraq

GK	1	Amer Shafi (c)
RB	11	Oday Zahran
CB	3	Tareq Khattab
CB	19	Anas Bani Yaseen	(yellow card) 54' (yellow-red card) 84'
LB	21	Mohammad Al-Dmeiri
DM	5	Mohammad Mustafa
RM	13	Khalil Bani Attiah		(substituted off) 60'
LM	18	Ahmed Elias	(yellow card) 8'	(substituted off) 87'
AM	9	Ahmed Sariweh		(substituted off) 81'
CF	10	Ahmad Hayel
CF	8	Odai Al-Saify	(yellow card) 87'
Substitutions:
MF	23	Yousef Al-Rawashdeh		(substituted on) 60'
FW	7	Mahmoud Za'tara	(yellow card) 90+2'	(substituted on) 81'
MF	14	Abdallah Deeb		(substituted on) 87'
Manager:
(England) Ray Wilkins

GK	12	Jalal Hasan
RB	23	Waleed Salem
CB	2	Ahmad Ibrahim
CB	14	Salam Shaker
LB	15	Dhurgham Ismail
CM	5	Yaser Kasim	(yellow card) 51'
CM	21	Saad Abdul-Amir
RW	7	Amjad Kalaf	(yellow card) 83'
AM	17	Alaa Abdul-Zahra	(yellow card) 19'	(substituted off) 90'
LW	11	Humam Tariq		(substituted off) 57'
CF	10	Younis Mahmoud (c)		(substituted off) 73'
Substitutions:
FW	8	Justin Meram		(substituted on) 57'
MF	9	Ahmed Yasin		(substituted on) 73'
MF	13	Osama Rashid		(substituted on) 90'
Manager:
Radhi Shenaishil

Man of the Match:

- Yaser Kasim (Iraq)

Assistant referees:

- Badr Al-Shumrani (Saudi Arabia)
- Abdulah Al Shalwai (Saudi Arabia)

Fourth official:

- Hettikamkanamge Perera (Sri Lanka)

Fifth official:

- Palitha Hemathunga (Sri Lanka)

=== Palestine vs Jordan ===
Hamza Al-Dardour became only the fourth player in the history of the AFC Asian Cup to score four goals in a single game as two-time quarter-finalists Jordan kept their knockout stage hopes alive with a resounding 5–1 win over Palestine. Yousef Al-Rawashdeh's eye-catching strike 12 minutes before half-time at Melbourne Rectangular Stadium settled any nerves for Jordan, who had previously not won a match since their final AFC Asian Cup qualifier in March 2013 having suffered a 1–0 defeat by Iraq in their tournament opener.

And with recalled striker Al Dardour netting twice inside the final ten minutes of the first half before scoring twice inside the final 15 minutes, Jordan would remain in Melbourne to face defending champions Japan on 20 January still in contention to maintain their 100% record of qualifying for the quarter-finals. Debutants Palestine, though, would travel to Canberra to face Iraq facing an uphill battle to still progress having earlier lost 4–0 to Japan despite Jaka Ihbeisheh netting their historic first AFC Asian Cup goal with five minutes remaining.

With both sides looking to bounce back from opening defeats, 2014 AFC Challenge Cup winners Palestine almost opened the scoring after just five minutes as only an alert one-handed save from Jordan goalkeeper Amer Shafi turned Hesham Salhe's vicious dipping strike from 25 yards onto the crossbar. Jordan did settle into the contest as the half progressed, although Palestine goalkeeper Ramzi Saleh remained largely untested as Abdallah Deeb flashed an effort just wide of the post midway through the opening 45 minutes. But Saleh could do little 12 minutes before half-time as Jordan quickly worked the ball across and into the left hand corner of the penalty area for Ahmad, and with the midfielder given time to steady himself and pick his spot, he expertly curled the ball into the top corner past the despairing dive of the Palestine goalkeeper.

Less than two minutes later Saleh was again beaten as the custodian was drawn out of position by Deeb as the striker charged into the area before the Jordan forward played the ball across the six yard area for Al Dardour to slide in bravely at the back post. And with the last kick of the first half Jordan added a third in stoppage time as Al Dardour, who did not feature during the opening defeat by Iraq, stabbed home from close range as Saleh was unable to cut out Odai Al-Saify's drilled first-time cross. Palestine looked to recover from a disastrous end to the first half and came out strongly after half-time, with only a superb one-handed block from Shafi denying Abdelhamid Abuhabib, although at the other end, Saleh had to be on his toes to push Oday Zahran's lofted effort over the crossbar. Ahmed Al Hassan's side continued to press in the closing stages, but with 15 minutes remaining, Al Dardour completed his hat-trick with a superb solo goal as the striker coolly beat Saleh having picked the ball up just inside Palestine's half. And five minutes later, Al Dardour joined Iranian duo Behtash Fariba and Ali Daei and Bahrain's Ismail Abdul-Latif on the list of players to score four goals at the AFC Asian Cup as the striker stabbed home Zahran's cross from just outside the six yard area. There was, though, still time for Palestine to net their first AFC Asian Cup goal as Ihbeisheh netted from close range with five minutes remaining.

16 January 2015
18:00 AEDT (UTC+11)

Palestine	1–5	Jordan
Ihbeisheh 84'	Report	Al-Rawashdeh 32'; Al-Dardour 34', 45+2', 75', 79'

Melbourne Rectangular Stadium, Melbourne
Attendance: 10,808
Referee: Kim Jong-hyeok (South Korea)

Palestine	Jordan

GK	21	Ramzi Saleh (c)	(yellow card) 80'
RB	18	Mus'ab Al-Batat
CB	15	Abdelatif Bahdari
CB	12	Tamer Salah
LB	14	Abdullah Jaber
RM	3	Hussam Abu Saleh		(substituted off) 55'
CM	8	Hesham Salhe		(substituted off) 80'
CM	23	Murad Ismail Said
LM	13	Jaka Ihbeisheh
SS	19	Abdelhamid Abuhabib
CF	7	Ashraf Nu'man		(substituted off) 73'
Substitutions:
FW	10	Ismail Al-Amour		(substituted on) 55'
FW	16	Mahmoud Eid		(substituted on) 73'
MF	20	Khader Yousef		(substituted on) 80'
Manager:
Ahmed Al Hassan

GK	1	Amer Shafi (c)
RB	11	Oday Zahran
CB	3	Tareq Khattab
CB	5	Mohammad Mustafa
LB	21	Mohammad Al-Dmeiri
DM	18	Ahmed Elias
RM	8	Odai Al-Saify
LM	23	Yousef Al-Rawashdeh	(substituted off) 69'
AM	6	Saeed Murjan	(substituted off) 52'
CF	20	Hamza Al-Dardour	(substituted off) 81'
CF	14	Abdallah Deeb
Substitutions:
MF	13	Khalil Bani Attiah	(substituted on) 52'
MF	9	Ahmed Sariweh	(substituted on) 69'
MF	15	Mohammad Al-Dawud	(substituted on) 81'
Manager:
(England) Ray Wilkins

Man of the Match:

- Hamza Al-Dardour (Jordan)

Assistant referees:

- Jeong Hae-sang (South Korea)
- Yoon Kwang-yeol (South Korea)

Fourth official:

- Ammar Al-Jeneibi (United Arab Emirates)

Fifth official:

- Mohd Yusri Muhamad (Malaysia)

=== Iraq vs Japan ===
Man of the match Keisuke Honda's penalty helped Japan to their second straight victory as the defending champions eked out a 1–0 win over Iraq. Honda netted from the spot midway through the opening half as Javier Aguirre's side stayed on top of the group with the maximum six points, three points more than Iraq and Jordan, who defeated Palestine 5–1 earlier in the day. Japan's qualification for the quarter-finals rests on their last first-round game on 20 January in Melbourne against the Jordan.

Honda was involved in all of Japan's best moments in the first half, starting with a through ball for Shinji Kagawa that the Borussia Dortmund man fired wide in the 11th minute. Iraq returned the favour four minutes later from a corner, Ahmad Ibrahim Khalaf calling Eiji Kawashima into action with a soaring header the Standard Liège custodian managed to keep out. Honda headed off the bottom of the right-hand post in the 17th minute before Yasuhito Endō, making his 150th appearance for Japan, started a sequence through the box that Kagawa should have finished on 21 minutes from close range. A minute later, though, Aguirre's men managed to put themselves on the scoreboard as Honda was taken down in the area by Ali Adnan. Honda stepped up to the spot himself, converting for his second goal of the tournament to push the holders in front.

Shinji Okazaki, said to be on the shopping list of several Premier League clubs this winter, should have doubled Japan's lead after 33 minutes but missed a free header that kept the Iraqis within one goal going into half-time. Two minutes after the break, Honda picked up where he left off in the first half, smashing against the crossbar with his weaker right foot from 20 yards out, and he had the best chance of the game four minutes past the hour that should have all but ended the contest.

Substitute Hiroshi Kiyotake, who gave Japan a lift after coming on, set up Honda with a slick pass across the face of the goal but the A.C. Milan man, despite being completely free at the far post, somehow uncharacteristically missed, hitting the upright. Japan continued to flirt with the idea of scoring a second but came up short before the final whistle ended what turned out to be a relatively tame meeting between the winners of the last two Asian Cups.

16 January 2015
19:00 AEST (UTC+10)

Iraq	0–1	Japan
	Report	Honda 23' (pen.)

Brisbane Stadium, Brisbane
Attendance: 22,941
Referee: Alireza Faghani (Iran)

Iraq	Japan

GK	12	Jalal Hasan
RB	23	Waleed Salem
CB	2	Ahmad Ibrahim
CB	14	Salam Shaker	(yellow card) 61'
LB	15	Dhurgham Ismail
CM	21	Saad Abdul-Amir
CM	5	Yaser Kasim
RW	7	Amjad Kalaf		(substituted off) 82'
AM	17	Alaa Abdul-Zahra	(yellow card) 51'
LW	6	Ali Adnan		(substituted off) 67'
CF	10	Younis Mahmoud (c)		(substituted off) 54'
Substitutions:
FW	8	Justin Meram		(substituted on) 54'
MF	9	Ahmed Yasin		(substituted on) 67'
MF	13	Osama Rashid		(substituted on) 82'
Manager:
Radhi Shenaishil

GK	1	Eiji Kawashima
RB	21	Gōtoku Sakai
CB	22	Maya Yoshida
CB	6	Masato Morishige
LB	5	Yuto Nagatomo
RM	10	Shinji Kagawa
CM	17	Makoto Hasebe (c)
LM	7	Yasuhito Endō		(substituted off) 63'
RW	4	Keisuke Honda		(substituted off) 89'
LW	18	Takashi Inui		(substituted off) 63'
CF	9	Shinji Okazaki
Substitutions:
MF	8	Hiroshi Kiyotake	(yellow card) 73'	(substituted on) 63'
MF	15	Yasuyuki Konno	(yellow card) 90+2'	(substituted on) 63'
MF	14	Yoshinori Muto		(substituted on) 89'
Manager:
(Mexico) Javier Aguirre

Man of the Match:

- Keisuke Honda (Japan)

Assistant referees:

- Reza Sokhandan (Iran)
- Mohammad Reza Abolfazli (Iran)

Fourth official:

- Hettikamkanamge Perera (Sri Lanka)

Fifth official:

- Palitha Hemathunga (Sri Lanka)

=== Japan vs Jordan ===
Keisuke Honda scored for the third consecutive game as defending champions Japan finally confirmed their place in the quarter-finals of the tournament as 2–0 win over a brave Jordan completed a 100% record in Group D. The four-time winners only needed a point in front of a 25,000 crowd at Melbourne Rectangular Stadium having earlier beaten Palestine and Iraq, but Honda's 24th-minute strike and a late second from Shinji Kagawa saw Javier Aguirre's side claim the win; meanwhile this meant for the first time ever in Jordan's Asian Cup participation, they'd failed to qualify into the knockout stage; and also for the first time in Asian Cup history, Jordan lost to Japan, having drawn Japan twice in 2004 and 2011. Having ended Jordan's hopes of an appearance in the last eight as Iraq claimed second place in Group D after beating Palestine in Canberra, Japan would face Group C runners-up the United Arab Emirates in Sydney on 23 January for a place in the semi-finals. Japan coach Aguirre named the same side for a third consecutive game with the defending champions only needing a point to qualify for the quarter-finals as Group D winners, while opposite number Ray Wilkins made one change with Anas Bani Yaseen returning from suspension to replace Saeed Murjan and with Jordan needing to at least avoid defeat to keep their quarter-final hopes alive, Ray Wilkins' side showed their intentions, lining up in an attacking 4-3-3 formation and pressing Japan from the first whistle.

Jordan's plans, though, were almost dealt a huge blow after just 10 minutes as Takashi Inui smashed home Kagawa's pull-back only for the assistant referee's flag on the near side to rule the ball had crossed the line prior to the delivery from the Borussia Dortmund midfielder. But Japan eventually took the lead midway through the first half as Jordan goalkeeper Amer Shafi could only parry Shinji Okazaki's angled strike from Inui's clever pass across goal and Honda was on hand to net from a tight angle. Shafi, though, denied the defending champions a second five minutes later as the Jordan goalkeeper showed superb reflexes to push Masato Morishige's point-blank header from Honda's vicious corner over the crossbar as Japan continued to control the game and restrict their opponents to rare forays forward. Needing to at least avoid defeat, striker Ahmad Hayel and midfielder Munther Abu Amarah were introduced at half-time for Jordan, and the move paid off as Wilkins' side started the second 45 minutes with added vigor after Japan had enjoyed nearly 75 percent possession in the first half.

Japan, though, still remained the more likely to add to their lead and Shafi had to be on his toes to push away Honda's strike from just outside the area with 19 minutes remaining, with Jordan beginning to tire as the half progressed having valiantly tried to keep up with their opponents' superior passing and movement. The Japanese made sure of the three points with eight minutes remaining when a cross from substitute Yoshinori Muto found the onrushing Kagawa close to the penalty spot and Shafi was only able to help the first-time strike into the back of the net. Japan came close to adding a third in the first minute of stoppage time, but Honda was unfortunate to see his low drilled strike from inside the area crash into the post with Shafi rooted to the spot.

20 January 2015
20:00 AEDT (UTC+11)

Japan	2–0	Jordan
Honda 24'; Kagawa 82'	Report

Melbourne Rectangular Stadium, Melbourne
Attendance: 25,016
Referee: Ravshan Irmatov (Uzbekistan)

Japan	Jordan

GK	1	Eiji Kawashima
RB	21	Gōtoku Sakai
CB	22	Maya Yoshida
CB	6	Masato Morishige
LB	5	Yuto Nagatomo
DM	17	Makoto Hasebe (c)
RM	4	Keisuke Honda
CM	7	Yasuhito Endō		(substituted off) 86'
CM	10	Shinji Kagawa
LM	18	Takashi Inui	(yellow card) 48'	(substituted off) 49'
CF	9	Shinji Okazaki	(yellow card) 46'	(substituted off) 78'
Substitutions:
MF	8	Hiroshi Kiyotake		(substituted on) 49'
MF	14	Yoshinori Muto		(substituted on) 78'
MF	20	Gaku Shibasaki		(substituted on) 86'
Manager:
(Mexico) Javier Aguirre

GK	1	Amer Shafi (c)
RB	11	Oday Zahran
CB	3	Tareq Khattab
CB	19	Anas Bani Yaseen
LB	21	Mohammad Al-Dmeiri
DM	5	Mohammad Mustafa	(yellow card) 11'
RM	23	Yousef Al-Rawashdeh	(yellow card) 38'	(substituted off) 46'
LM	18	Ahmed Elias
AM	8	Odai Al-Saify
CF	20	Hamza Al-Dardour		(substituted off) 73'
CF	14	Abdallah Deeb		(substituted off) 46'
Substitutions:
FW	10	Ahmad Hayel		(substituted on) 46'
MF	16	Munther Abu Amarah		(substituted on) 46'
MF	13	Khalil Bani Attiah		(substituted on) 73'
Manager:
(England) Ray Wilkins

Man of the Match:

- Shinji Kagawa (Japan)

Assistant referees:

- Abdukhamidullo Rasulov (Uzbekistan)
- Bakhadyr Kochkarov (Kyrgyzstan)

Fourth official:

- Ammar Al-Jeneibi (United Arab Emirates)

Fifth official:

- Palitha Hemathunga (Sri Lanka)

=== Iraq vs Palestine ===
Goals from Younis Mahmoud and Ahmed Yasin led Iraq into the quarter-finals and a meeting with arch-rivals Iran, after a 2–0 victory against Palestine at Canberra Stadium. Mahmoud's first goal in the tournament Down Under came on 48 minutes and was his seventh in AFC Asian Cup competitions, meaning he has now scored in four consecutive continental championships since he first appeared at the 2004 edition. Mahmoud's could have had a second just before the hour mark, too, but Palestine's back-up goalkeeper Tawfiq Ali, who put on an impressive show throughout in the absence of the injured Ramzi Saleh, saved the forward's spot-kick.

But two minutes before the end midfielder Yasin, making his first start of the tournament, sealed the points and the victory for Iraq. The win means Iraq finish second in Group D, behind defending champions Japan who topped Jordan 2–0 in the day's other game, and Radhi Shenaishil and his team would remain in Canberra for their last-eight showdown with Group C winners Iran on 23 January. Handed his first start of the tournament, Justin Meram went close to justifying his coach's decision after just three minutes as he jinked inside following a long throw on the left and into the area but he was closed down quickly and his shot stuttered into the hands of goalkeeper Ali. Palestine themselves could have taken a shock lead on 20 minutes as Jalal Hasan made a hash of Ashraf Nu'man's corner but the ball was cleared just before Abdelatif Bahdari could pounce on the loose ball.

While Iraq dominated the first period, they found Ali showing no signs of nerves in his first start and in confident form. The 24-year-old goalkeeper saved a swerving long-range effort from Waleed Salem 20 minutes into the contest before diving low to his right to block Mahmoud's header five minutes before the interval. And Iraq's profligacy continued in just the second minute of the restart as Mahmoud blazed wide when the influential Yasin's pull-back found him inside the penalty area. But the striker's woes in front of goal would last only another minute. From half-time substitute Ali Adnan's corner, Mahmoud's rose highest to direct a firm header past Ali. Almost immediately after that setback, Palestine then had their best chance of the night as a poor pass from Salam Shaker fell into the pass of the alert Nu’man but Hasan pulled off an impressive save with his feet to block the goal-bound effort.

The game began to open up as both teams looked for goals before Ahmed Harbi brought down Meram inside the area for a penalty to Iraq just before the hour-mark. Mahmoud stepped up, looking for his second of the night, but Ali continued his impressive performance by diving the right way, low to his left, and parried the ball away. Iraq continued to hammer away at the Palestine defence and eventually a second goal came their way in the game's dying minutes as Yasin scored the goal his fine performance warranted with a powerful low strike from the edge of the area that zipped into the back of the net and Adnan could have made it three late on with an effort that hit the upright, but the points were safe as the final whistle blew shortly after to the delight of the large contingent of Iraqi fans.

20 January 2015
20:00 AEDT (UTC+11)

Iraq	2–0	Palestine
Mahmoud 48'; Yasin 88'	Report

Canberra Stadium, Canberra
Attendance: 10,235
Referee: Mohammed Abdulla Hassan Mohamed (United Arab Emirates)

Iraq	Palestine

GK	12	Jalal Hasan
RB	23	Waleed Salem
CB	2	Ahmad Ibrahim
CB	14	Salam Shaker
LB	15	Dhurgham Ismail
CM	21	Saad Abdul-Amir
CM	5	Yaser Kasim
RW	7	Amjad Kalaf	(substituted off) 46'
AM	8	Justin Meram	(substituted off) 71'
LW	9	Ahmed Yasin
CF	10	Younis Mahmoud (c)	(substituted off) 79'
Substitutions:
DF	6	Ali Adnan	(substituted on) 46'
MF	13	Osama Rashid	(substituted on) 71'
FW	16	Marwan Hussein	(substituted on) 79'
Manager:
Radhi Shenaishil

GK	1	Tawfiq Ali
RB	4	Ahmed Harbi	(yellow card) 59'
CB	9	Khaled Salem
CB	15	Abdelatif Bahdari (c)
LB	14	Abdullah Jaber
RM	10	Ismail Al-Amour		(substituted off) 67'
CM	20	Khader Yousef
CM	8	Hesham Salhe	(yellow card) 21'
LM	11	Ahmed Maher
SS	7	Ashraf Nu'man
CF	16	Mahmoud Eid		(substituted off) 79'
Substitutions:
MF	13	Jaka Ihbeisheh		(substituted on) 67'
MF	19	Abdelhamid Abuhabib		(substituted on) 79'
Manager:
Ahmed Al Hassan

Man of the Match:

- Saad Abdul-Amir (Iraq)

Assistant referees:

- Mohamed Al Hammadi (United Arab Emirates)
- Hasan Al Mahri (United Arab Emirates)

Fourth official:

- Mohd Amirul Izwan (Malaysia)

Fifth official:

- Mohd Yusri Muhamad (Malaysia)
