= Abdallah Jaber =

Footballer (born 1993)

Personal information
- Date of birth: 17 February 1993 (age 33)
- Place of birth: Tayibe, Israel
- Height: 1.75 m (5 ft 9 in)
- Position: Left-back

Team information
- Current team: Maccabi Bnei Reineh
- Number: 14

Youth career
- –2010: Hapoel Kfar Saba
- 2010–2011: Ironi Ramat HaSharon

Senior career*
Years	Team	Apps	(Gls)
2011–2013	Ironi Ramat HaSharon	1	(0)
2013–2015	Hilal Al-Quds	43	(5)
2015–2020	Ahli Al-Khalil	62	(15)
2020–2021	Hapoel Hadera	27	(0)
2021–2023	Bnei Sakhnin	36	(1)
2023–	Maccabi Bnei Reineh	91	(3)

International career^{‡}
2014–2016	Palestine U23	8	(0)
2014–2020	Palestine	56	(2)
- * Club domestic league appearances and goals as of 24 June 2026 ‡ National team caps and goals as of 19 November 2019

Abdallah Jaber (Arabic: عَبْد الله جَابِر, Hebrew: עבדאללה ג'אבר; born 17 February 1993) is a professional footballer who plays as a left-back for Israeli Premier League club Maccabi Bnei Reineh. Born in Israel, he represented the Palestine national team.

He played for and captained the Palestine national team until he was banned from it due to him playing for an Israeli Premier League club in 2020. He is the youngest Palestinian footballer to amass 35 international caps, having started 35 of Palestine's 40 games between May 2014 and August 2018.

== Early life ==
Jaber was born in Tayibe, Israel, to a Muslim-Arab family. His grandfather Abdullah and his father Nabil were renowned local footballers in his hometown. His younger brother Mahmoud Jaber is also a professional footballer, although he has played for the Israel national team since 2 June 2022.

== Club career ==
He made his senior debut for Israeli Premier League club Ironi Ramat HaSharon in the 2011–12 season, playing 23 minutes as a substitute. He was part of the team that finished sixth (the club's best ever finish) in the league the following season.

=== Move to West Bank Premier League ===
Jaber made the decision to move to the Palestinian league, signing with Hilal Al-Quds of the West Bank Premier League in 2013–14. He won the Palestine Cup that season with Hilal at the end of his first season.

Jaber made his AFC Cup debut with Hilal in 2015 and helped keep a clean sheet in a playoff draw against eventual quarterfinalists Al-Jaish.

At the beginning of the 2015–16 season, Jaber elected to sign with Ahli Al-Khalil.

=== Move to Egyptian Premier League ===
In August 2016, Abdallah Jaber agreed a three-year deal with Al Mokawloon Al Arab of the Egyptian Premier League. His contract was voided three days later. The following year, Jaber signed for Alexandria-based Al Ittihad, but the deal was voided again, with the club revealing that the player's Israeli passport had nullified his registration with the Egyptian Football Association.

=== Move to Israeli Premier League ===
==== Hapoel Hadera ====
On 25 May 2020, Jaber signed with Israeli Premier League club Hapoel Hadera on a free transfer from Hilal Al-Quds.

==== Bnei Sakhnin ====
On 29 May 2021, Jaber signed with Israeli club Bnei Sakhnin.

==== Maccabi Bnei Reineh ====
In January 2023, Jaber joined Israeli Premier League club Maccabi Bnei Reineh.

== International career ==
Abdallah Jaber earned his first cap, aged 21, in the 2014 AFC Challenge Cup opening game when Palestine faced Kyrgyzstan. Despite his inexperience, he helped Palestine keep a clean sheet in a game they won 1–0. He played 360 of the 450 minutes of the tournament, helping Palestine lift the title without conceding a goal en route to their first AFC Asian Cup appearance.

His first international goal came during his 8th cap in a 2–0 friendly win vs. Pakistan. He scored his second goal in October 2017, in a 2019 AFC Asian Cup qualification match against Bhutan.

At the 2015 AFC Asian Cup he was one of only two Palestine players to start and play every single minute of the tournament. His performances were widely regarded as one of the few highlights of an otherwise dour campaign that saw Palestine lose all three games.

Jaber remained a crucial player for Palestine, having started and played every single minute of the side's 2018 FIFA World Cup qualification.

He played for as well as captained the Palestine national team, until he was banned from it, due to him playing for an Israeli Premier League club in 2020. He is the youngest Palestinian footballer to amass 35 international caps, having started 35 of Palestine's 40 games between May 2014 and August 2018.

== Career statistics ==
=== International goals ===
Scores and results list Palestine's goal tally first.

No	Date	Venue	Opponent	Score	Result	Competition
1.	12 October 2014	Punjab Stadium, Lahore, Pakistan	Pakistan	2–0	2–0	Friendly
2.	10 October 2017	Dora International Stadium, Hebron, Palestine	Bhutan	2–0	10–0	2019 AFC Asian Cup qualification

== Achievements ==
- AFC Challenge Cup

Winner (1): 2014

- Palestine Cup

Winner (5): 2013–14, 2014–15, 2014–15, 2015–16, 2016–17

- Palestine Super Cup

Winner (2): 2014, 2015

- Yasser Arafat Cup

Winner (1): 2014
