= Yousef Al-Rawashdeh =

Jordanian footballer

Personal information
- Full name: Yousef Ahmad Mohammad Al-Rawashdeh
- Date of birth: March 14, 1990 (age 36)
- Place of birth: Dubai, United Arab Emirates
- Height: 1.71 m (5 ft 7 in)
- Position: Left winger

Team information
- Current team: Al-Arabi

Youth career
- 2004–2006: Al-Arabi

Senior career*
Years	Team	Apps	(Gls)
2006–2013	Al-Arabi		
2013–2014	Al-Jazeera		
2014–2016	Al-Ramtha		
2016–2019	Al-Faisaly		
2019	Dibba Al-Fujairah	13	(2)
2019–2020	Al-Faisaly		
2020	Mesaimeer		
2021	Muaither		
2021-2023	Al-Faisaly		
2023	Amanat Baghdad		
2024	Ma'an		
2024–2025	Al-Sareeh	20	(1)
2025–2026	Al-Salt	22	(3)
2026–	Al-Arabi	0	(0)

International career^{‡}
2007–2008	Jordan U19		(2)
2010–2011	Jordan U23		(1)
2013–2021	Jordan	68	(6)
- * Club domestic league appearances and goals as of 12 July 2026 ‡ National team caps and goals as of 15 June 2021

Yousef Ahmad Mohammad Al-Rawashdeh (Arabic: يوسف أحمد محمد الرواشدة) is a footballer who plays as a Forward for Jordanian Pro League club Al-Arabi.

== International career ==
Being born in the UAE, he was eligible to represent both Jordan and the UAE, which he chose the former. Yousef played his first match with his national senior team against Kuwait on 9 October 2013 in an international friendly at King Abdullah II Stadium in Amman, Jordan, which ended in a 1–1 draw. Yousef scored his debut goal with his national senior team against Singapore during the qualifiers for the 2015 Asian Cup at Jalan Besar Stadium, in Kallang, Singapore on 4 February 2014. The match ended in a 3–1 win.

== International goals ==
=== U-19 ===
#	Date	Venue	Opponent	Score	Result	Competition
1	November 8, 2007	Tashkent	Uzbekistan	3–1	Loss	2008 AFC Youth Championship qualification
2	November 3, 2008	Khobar	Thailand	3–2	Loss	2008 AFC U-19 Championship

=== U-23 ===
#	Date	Venue	Opponent	Score	Result	Competition
1	March 9, 2011	Taipei	Chinese Taipei	2–0	Win	2012 Summer Olympics Qualifiers

=== Senior team ===
Scores and results list Jordan's goal tally first.

No.	Date	Venue	Opponent	Score	Result	Competition
1.	4 February 2014	Jalan Besar Stadium, Kallang, Singapore	Singapore	3–1	3–1	2015 AFC Asian Cup qualification
2.	16 January 2015	Melbourne Rectangular Stadium, Melbourne, Australia	Palestine	1–0	5–1	2015 AFC Asian Cup
3.	24 March 2016	Amman International Stadium, Amman, Jordan	Bangladesh	4–0	8–0	2018 FIFA World Cup qualification
4.	20 May 2018	Amman International Stadium, Amman, Jordan	Cyprus	3–0	3–0	Friendly
5.	11 June 2019	King Abdullah II Stadium, Amman, Jordan	Indonesia	3–0	4–1	Friendly
6.	10 August 2019	Franso Hariri Stadium, Erbil, Iraq	Saudi Arabia	2–0	3–0	2019 WAFF Championship

== International career statistics ==
As of 20 May 2018

Jordan national team
Year	Apps	Goals
2013	6	0
2014	7	1
2015	10	1
2016	9	1
2017	5	0
2018	3	1
Total	40	4
