= 2015 AFC Asian Cup =

Tournament details
- Host country: Australia
- Dates: 9–31 January 2015
- Teams: 16 (from 1 confederation)
- Venues: 5 (in 5 host cities)

Final positions
- Champions: Australia (1st title)
- Runners-up: South Korea
- Third place: United Arab Emirates
- Fourth place: Iraq

Tournament statistics
- Matches played: 32
- Goals scored: 85 (2.66 per match)
- Attendance: 705,705 (22,053 per match)
- Top scorer(s): (United Arab Emirates) Ali Mabkhout (5 goals)
- Best player: (Australia) Massimo Luongo
- Best goalkeeper: (Australia) Mathew Ryan
- Fair play award: Australia

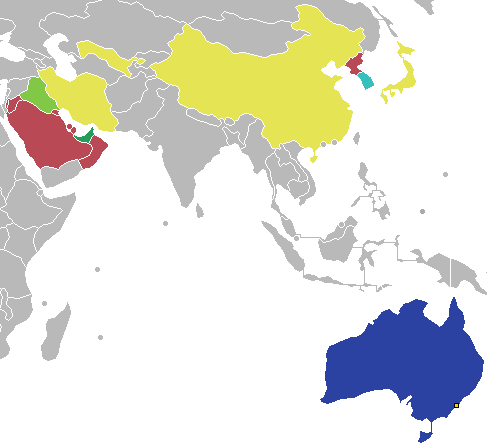
Result of countries participating in the 2015 AFC Asian Cup: Champion Runner-up / Third place Fourth place / Quarter-finals Group stage

The 2015 AFC Asian Cup was the 16th edition of the men's AFC Asian Cup, a quadrennial international football tournament organised by the Asian Football Confederation (AFC). It was held in Australia from 9 to 31 January 2015. The tournament was won by Australia after defeating South Korea 2–1 in extra time in the final, thereby earning the right to participate in the 2017 FIFA Confederations Cup, which was hosted by Russia. The win was Australia's first Asian title since their move from the Oceania Football Confederation (OFC) in 2006. It was also the first time a men's team has become champions of two confederations, following Australia's four OFC Nations Cup titles: 1980, 1996, 2000 and 2004; right after the Australian women's team won the 2010 AFC Women's Asian Cup. Australia thus became the final and permanent holder of the old AFC Asian Cup trophy, as the new trophy would debut in the tournament four years later.

Australia was chosen as the host on 5 January 2011, after being the sole bidder for the right to host the 2015 tournament. The matches were played in five different stadiums across five cities: Sydney, Melbourne, Brisbane, Canberra and Newcastle. It was the first time that Australia had hosted the tournament, and it was also the first time the Asian Cup had been held outside the continent of Asia. As hosts, Australia automatically qualified for the final tournament, while the remaining 15 finalists (with the exception of Japan and South Korea who qualified via their top three position in the previous Asian Cup) were decided through a qualification process, featuring 44 teams, from February 2013 to March 2014.

The final tournament was played in two stages: the group stage and the knockout stage. In the group stage each team played three games in a group of four, with the winners and runners-up from each group advancing to the knockout stage. In the knockout stage the eight teams competed in single-elimination matches, beginning with the quarter-finals and ending with the final match of the tournament. A third-place match was also played between the two losing teams of the semi-finals (Iraq and the United Arab Emirates). This was also the last time the tournament had a third-place match, as it wasn't played since the 2019 edition.

Japan were the defending champions going into the tournament, having won the previous competition in 2011. They recorded their worst finish in the Asian Cup since the 1996 edition in the United Arab Emirates, being knocked out in the quarter-finals by that team in a penalty shootout.

== Host selection ==
Australia initially put forward its bid to host the 2015 AFC Asian Cup in 2010. As the sole bidder for the hosting rights, Australia was officially named host on 5 January 2011.

Considering the efforts of the Football Federation Australia in developing the game on their territory and considering also all the achievements that have been made towards the development of football in Australia and to encourage Australia to take steps towards developing the game, I am happy and honoured to announce that the executive committee of the Asian Football Confederation has approved Australia as the host nation of the 2015 AFC Asian Cup.

— AFC President, Mohammed Bin Hammam

== Teams ==
=== Qualification ===
The 2015 AFC Asian Cup qualification process determined the 16 participating teams for the tournament. In the initial scheme, ten places were determined by qualification matches, while six places were reserved for the 2015 host nation, top three finishers in the 2011 AFC Asian Cup, and the two winners of the AFC Challenge Cup. Though, as the host nation Australia also finished as runners-up in the 2011 Asian Cup, the initial six automatic qualification spots were reduced to five, with a total of 11 spots eventually determined by the qualification matches, in which 20 AFC members competed.

There were two main competitive paths to the 2015 Asian Cup. The AFC Challenge Cup acted as a qualification competition for eligible countries within the emerging and developing category of member associations. The winners of the AFC Challenge Cup competitions in 2012 and 2014 qualified automatically for the 2015 AFC Asian Cup finals. The remaining spots were available for the teams competing in the main Asian Cup preliminaries. The AFC decided that the 20 teams involved in the qualifiers would be split into five groups of four teams each. The top two teams from each group and one best third-placed team from among all the groups would qualify for the 2015 AFC Asian Cup.

==== Qualified teams ====
Out of the sixteen teams that qualified, fourteen had participated in the 2011 tournament. Oman qualified for the first time since 2007. Palestine, winners of the 2014 AFC Challenge Cup, were the only team making their first appearance in the tournament. India and Syria are the only two teams from the 2011 tournament who failed to qualify for the subsequent edition. Excluding hosts Australia, none of the other 11 members of the ASEAN Football Federation qualified, nor did any of the South Asian national teams.

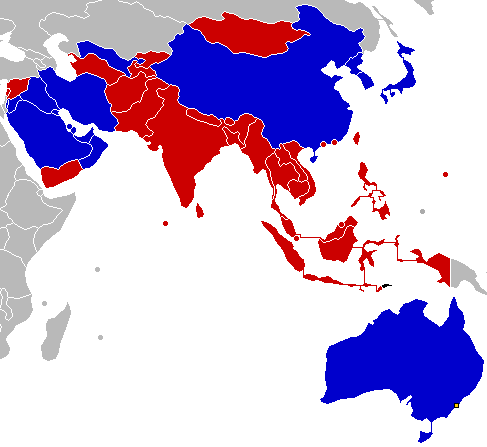
Qualified for Asian Cup Failed to qualify Did not enter Not an AFC member

| Team | Method of qualification | Date of qualification | Finals appearance | Last appearance | Previous best performance |
|---|---|---|---|---|---|
| Australia | Hosts | 5 January 2011 | 3rd | 2011 | Runners-up (2011) |
| Japan | 2011 AFC Asian Cup winners | 25 January 2011 | 8th | 2011 | Winners (1992, 2000, 2004, 2011) |
| South Korea | 2011 AFC Asian Cup 3rd place | 28 January 2011 | 13th | 2011 | Winners (1956, 1960) |
| North Korea | 2012 AFC Challenge Cup winners | 19 March 2012 | 4th | 2011 | Fourth place (1980) |
| Bahrain | Group D winners | 15 November 2013 | 5th | 2011 | Fourth place (2004) |
| United Arab Emirates | Group E winners | 15 November 2013 | 9th | 2011 | Runners-up (1996) |
| Saudi Arabia | Group C winners | 15 November 2013 | 9th | 2011 | Winners (1984, 1988, 1996) |
| Oman | Group A winners | 19 November 2013 | 3rd | 2007 | Group stage (2004, 2007) |
| Uzbekistan | Group E runners-up | 19 November 2013 | 6th | 2011 | Fourth place (2011) |
| Qatar | Group D runners-up | 19 November 2013 | 9th | 2011 | Quarter-finals (2000, 2011) |
| Iran | Group B winners | 19 November 2013 | 13th | 2011 | Winners (1968, 1972, 1976) |
| Kuwait | Group B runners-up | 19 November 2013 | 10th | 2011 | Winners (1980) |
| Jordan | Group A runners-up | 4 February 2014 | 3rd | 2011 | Quarter-finals (2004, 2011) |
| Iraq | Group C runners-up | 5 March 2014 | 8th | 2011 | Winners (2007) |
| China | Best third-placed team | 5 March 2014 | 11th | 2011 | Runners-up (1984, 2004) |
| Palestine | 2014 AFC Challenge Cup winners | 30 May 2014 | 1st | N/A | N/A |

=== Draw ===
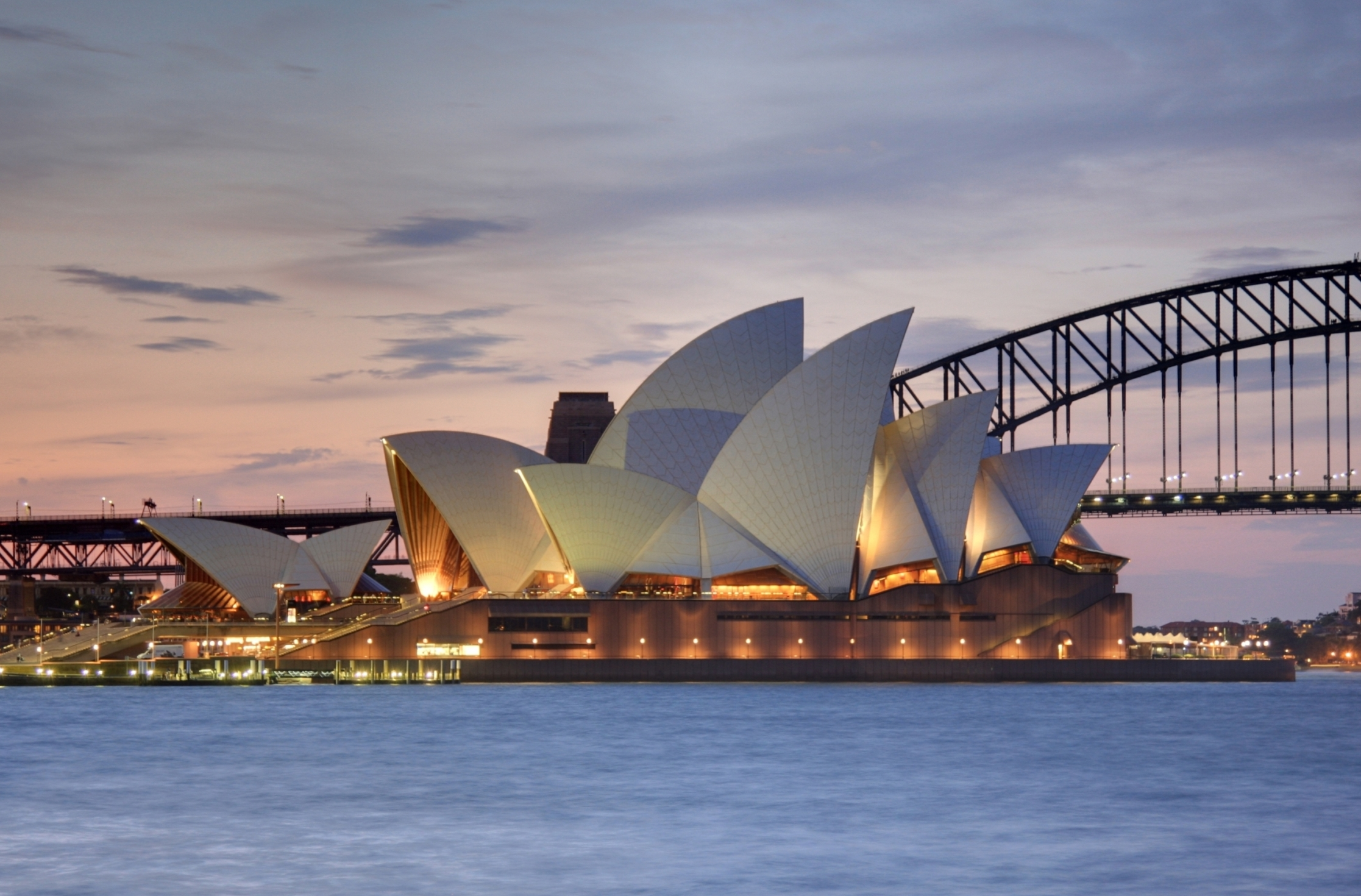
The Sydney Opera House, location for the final draw

The draw for the final tournament occurred at the Sydney Opera House on 26 March 2014. The draw procedure involved the 16 participating teams drawn at random into the four groups of the group stage. In preparation for this, the teams were organised into four pots based on a seeding which used the March 2014 FIFA World Rankings (rankings beside the qualified teams). The draw and seeding ensured a fair distribution of teams in the groups, with each of the four groups in the group stage made up of one team from each pot. The host nation (Australia) was automatically placed into Pot 1, with the team having been predetermined to be in Group A. In addition, at the time of the draw, the identity of the 2014 AFC Challenge Cup winners (Palestine) was not known yet, and they were automatically placed into Pot 4.

| Pot 1 | Pot 2 | Pot 3 | Pot 4 |
|---|---|---|---|
| Australia (63) (hosts); Iran (42); Japan (48); Uzbekistan (55) | South Korea (60); United Arab Emirates (61); Jordan (66); Saudi Arabia (75) | Oman (81); China (98); Qatar (101); Iraq (103) | Bahrain (106); Kuwait (110); North Korea (133); Palestine (167) |

== Venues ==
=== Stadiums ===
The five host cities for the 2015 AFC Asian Cup, Sydney, Melbourne, Brisbane, Canberra and Newcastle, were announced on 27 March 2013, with a total five stadiums to be used.

| Sydney | Brisbane | Newcastle |
|---|---|---|
| Stadium Australia | Brisbane Stadium | Newcastle Stadium |
| Capacity: 84,000 | Capacity: 52,500 | Capacity: 33,000 |
| Melbourne | 2015 AFC Asian Cup is located in Australia | |
| Melbourne Rectangular Stadium | 2015 AFC Asian Cup is located in Australia | |
| Capacity: 30,050 | 2015 AFC Asian Cup is located in Australia | |
| Canberra | 2015 AFC Asian Cup is located in Australia | |
| Canberra Stadium | 2015 AFC Asian Cup is located in Australia | |
| Capacity: 25,011 | 2015 AFC Asian Cup is located in Australia | |

=== Ticketing ===
Tickets for the venues were sold directly by AFC via its website, or distributed by the football associations of the 16 finalists. 500,000 tickets were available for the 31 tournament matches. Over 45,000 international visitors were forecast to visit Australia during the tournament. Prices varied from $10 (for a seat behind the goals at a group match) to $150 (for a seat in the main stand at the final). In addition to individual match tickets, fans could buy packages to see all matches played at one specific venue.

=== Team base camps ===
Each team had a "team base camp" for its stay between the matches. From an initial list of 27 potential locations, the national associations chose their locations in 2014. The teams trained and resided in these locations throughout the tournament, travelling to games staged away from their bases.

| Team | Arrival | Last match | Base camp | Group stage venues | QF venues | SF venues | Final venue |
|---|---|---|---|---|---|---|---|
| Australia | 29 December | 31 January | Melbourne | Melbourne, Sydney & Brisbane | Brisbane | Newcastle | Sydney |
| Bahrain | 22 December | 19 January | Ballarat | Melbourne, Canberra & Sydney | —N/a | —N/a | —N/a |
| China | 29 December | 22 January | Sydney | Brisbane & Canberra | Brisbane | —N/a | —N/a |
| Iran | 31 December | 23 January | Sydney | Melbourne, Sydney & Brisbane | Canberra | —N/a | —N/a |
| Iraq | 1 January | 30 January | Canberra | Brisbane & Canberra | Canberra | Sydney | Newcastle |
| Japan | 3 January | 23 January | Cessnock | Newcastle, Brisbane & Melbourne | Sydney | —N/a | —N/a |
| Jordan | 23 December | 20 January | Melbourne | Brisbane & Melbourne | —N/a | —N/a | —N/a |
| Kuwait | 18 December | 17 January | Queanbeyan | Melbourne, Canberra & Newcastle | —N/a | —N/a | —N/a |
| North Korea | 15 December | 18 January | Canberra | Sydney, Melbourne & Canberra | —N/a | —N/a | —N/a |
| Oman | 28 December | 17 January | Sydney | Canberra, Sydney & Newcastle | —N/a | —N/a | —N/a |
| Palestine | 2 January | 20 January | Brisbane | Newcastle, Melbourne & Canberra | —N/a | —N/a | —N/a |
| Qatar | 28 December | 19 January | Canberra | Canberra & Sydney | —N/a | —N/a | —N/a |
| Saudi Arabia | 26 December | 18 January | Brisbane | Brisbane & Melbourne | —N/a | —N/a | —N/a |
| South Korea | 27 December | 31 January | Brisbane | Canberra & Brisbane | Melbourne | Sydney | Sydney |
| United Arab Emirates | 26 December | 30 January | Gold Coast | Canberra & Brisbane | Sydney | Newcastle | Newcastle |
| Uzbekistan | 3 January | 22 January | Melbourne | Sydney, Brisbane & Melbourne | Melbourne | —N/a | —N/a |

== Match ball ==
The Nike Ordem 2 was announced as the official 2015 Asian Cup match ball on 1 October 2014. The ball features the traditional colors of the tournament. The mainly white ball has a distinctive design with a mainly red graphic pattern and yellow details for better visibility. It shows the official 2015 AFC Asian Cup logo as well as a black Swoosh. The ball provided a design for real flight, accuracy and control, and features Nike Aerowtrac grooves and a micro-textured casing. Nike RaDaR (Rapid Decision and Response) technology with a unique graphic upper is also utilised in the design to see the ball faster while the three-layer synthetic upper made for optimal touch.

Ordem 2 was the Asian Cup's last match ball provided by Nike.

== Match officials ==
On 1 January 2015, the AFC named 47 match officials for the tournament, including referees, assistant referees, fourth officials, and reserve assistant referees. Each main refereeing team (of which there were eleven) consisted of three match officials from the same country: one referee and two assistant referees. The AFC decided three match officials from New Zealand would take part in the tournament, despite the country being in the Oceania Football Confederation. Match officials based together in Sydney, during the Asian Cup, where they trained together, had technical meetings, conduct match reviews and previews, and only split when attending appointments at the five Asian Cup stadiums in Canberra, Sydney, Newcastle, Brisbane and Melbourne. Australian referee Chris Beath, who was a fourth official before the start of the tournament, was promoted for one match when Uzbek referee Valentin Kovalenko had to withdraw due to illness.

| Country | Referee | Assistant referees |
|---|---|---|
| Australia | Ben Williams | Matthew Cream; Paul Cetrangolo |
| Bahrain | Nawaf Shukralla | Yaser Tulefat; Ebrahim Saleh |
| Iran | Alireza Faghani | Reza Sokhandan; Mohammad Reza Abolfazli |
| Japan | Ryuji Sato | Toru Sagara; Toshiyuki Nagi |
| New Zealand | Peter O'Leary | Jan-Hendrik Hintz; Mark Rule |
| Oman | Abdullah Al Hilali | Hamad Al-Mayahi; Abu Bakar Al Amri |
| Qatar | Abdulrahman Abdou | Taleb Al-Marri; Ramzan Al-Naemi |
| Saudi Arabia | Fahad Al-Mirdasi | Badr Al-Shumrani; Abdulla Al Shalwai |
| South Korea | Kim Jong-hyeok | Jeong Hae-Sang; Yoon Kwang-Yeol |
| United Arab Emirates | Abdulla Hassan Mohamed | Mohamed Al Hammadi; Hasan Al Mahri |
| Uzbekistan | Ravshan Irmatov | Abdukhamidullo Rasulov; Bakhadyr Kochkarov (Kyrgyzstan) |

Six match officials, who served as fourth officials, and eight reserve assistant referees, who served as fifth officials, were also named:

| Country | Fourth official |
|---|---|
| Australia | Chris Beath |
| Japan | Yudai Yamamoto |
| Malaysia | Mohd Amirul Izwan |
| Singapore | Muhammad Taqi Aljaafari |
| Sri Lanka | Hettikamkanamge Perera |
| United Arab Emirates | Ammar Al-Jeneibi |

| Country | Reserve assistant referees |
|---|---|
| Hong Kong | Chow Chun Kit |
| Iraq | Najah Raham Rashid |
| Japan | Akane Yagi |
| Malaysia | Mohd Yusri Muhamad |
| Malaysia | Azman Ismail |
| Singapore | Jeffrey Goh |
| Sri Lanka | Palitha Hemathunga |
| Uzbekistan | Jakhongir Saidov |

== Squads ==
As with the 2011 tournament, each team's squad consisted of 23 players (three of whom had to be goalkeepers). Each participating national association had to confirm their final 23-player squad no later than ten days before the start of the tournament. Teams were permitted to make late replacements in the event of serious injury, at any time up to 6 hours before their first game. During a match, all remaining squad members not named in the starting team were available to be one of the three permitted substitutions (provided the player was not serving a suspension).

== Group stage ==
The group stage of the 2015 AFC Asian Cup took place from 9–20 January 2015: each team played three games, with the winners and runners-up from each group advancing to the knockout stage. The group stage was notable for finishing without a draw. In doing so, it became the first major international football tournament since the 1930 FIFA World Cup to record a result for every group stage match. Additionally, it surpassed the record of consecutive results at a tournament – 18 – also set at the 1930 World Cup.

Tiebreaking criteria for group stage
The teams were ranked according to points (3 points for a win, 1 point for a tie, 0 points for a loss). If tied on points, tiebreakers are applied in the following order:
1. Greater number of points obtained in the group matches between the teams concerned
2. Goal difference resulting from the group matches between the teams concerned
3. Greater number of goals scored in the group matches between the teams concerned
4. Goal difference in all the group matches
5. Greater number of goals scored in all the group matches
6. Penalty shoot-out if only two teams are involved, and they are both on the field of play
7. Lower score calculated according to the number of yellow and red cards received in the group matches (1 point for a single yellow card, 3 points for a red card as a consequence of two yellow cards, 3 points for a direct red card, 4 points for a yellow card followed by a direct red card)
8. Drawing of lots

=== Group A ===
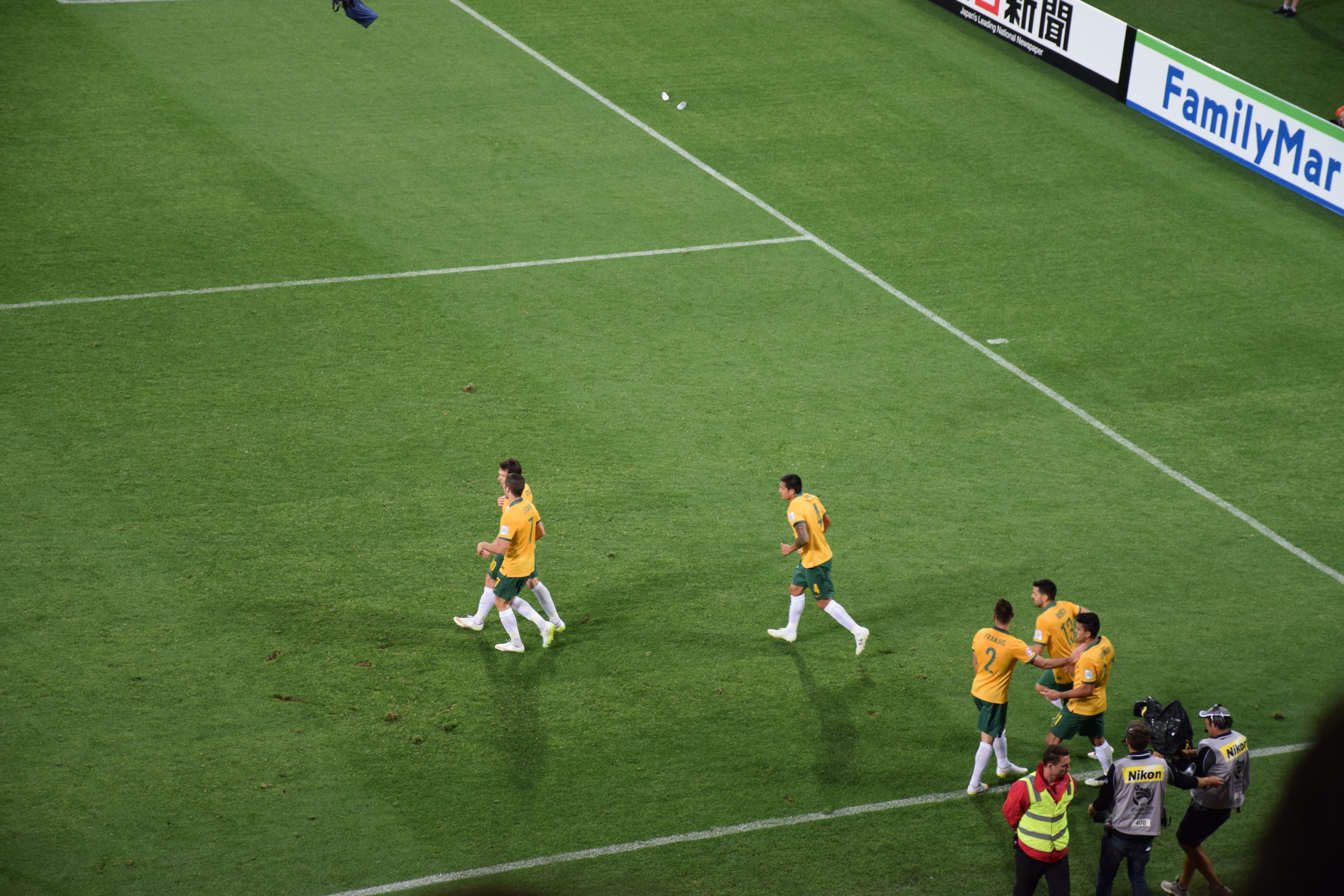
Opening match, Australia vs Kuwait

| Pos | Team | Pld | W | D | L | GF | GA | GD | Pts | Qualification |
|---|---|---|---|---|---|---|---|---|---|---|
| 1 | South Korea | 3 | 3 | 0 | 0 | 3 | 0 | +3 | 9 | Advance to knockout stage |
| 2 | Australia (H) | 3 | 2 | 0 | 1 | 8 | 2 | +6 | 6 | Advance to knockout stage |
| 3 | Oman | 3 | 1 | 0 | 2 | 1 | 5 | −4 | 3 | |
| 4 | Kuwait | 3 | 0 | 0 | 3 | 1 | 6 | −5 | 0 | |

Source: Asian Cup Australia 2015
(H) Hosts
9 January 2015
20:00 AEDT (UTC+11)

| Australia | 4–1 | Kuwait |
|---|---|---|
| Cahill 33'; Luongo 45'; Jedinak 62' (pen.); Troisi 90+2' | Report | Fadhel 8' |

Melbourne Rectangular Stadium, Melbourne
Attendance: 25,231
Referee: Ravshan Irmatov (Uzbekistan)
10 January 2015
16:00 AEDT (UTC+11)

| South Korea | 1–0 | Oman |
|---|---|---|
| Cho Young-cheol 45+1' | Report |

Canberra Stadium, Canberra
Attendance: 12,552
Referee: Peter O'Leary (New Zealand)

13 January 2015
18:00 AEDT (UTC+11)

| Kuwait | 0–1 | South Korea |
|---|---|---|
| | Report | Nam Tae-hee 36' |

Canberra Stadium, Canberra
Attendance: 8,795
Referee: Alireza Faghani (Iran)
13 January 2015
20:00 AEDT (UTC+11)

| Oman | 0–4 | Australia |
|---|---|---|
| | Report | McKay 27'; Kruse 30'; Milligan 45+2' (pen.); Jurić 70' |

Stadium Australia, Sydney
Attendance: 50,276
Referee: Ryuji Sato (Japan)

17 January 2015
19:00 AEST (UTC+10)

| Australia | 0–1 | South Korea |
|---|---|---|
| | Report | Lee Jeong-hyeop 33' |

Brisbane Stadium, Brisbane
Attendance: 48,513
Referee: Nawaf Shukralla (Bahrain)
17 January 2015
20:00 AEDT (UTC+11)

| Oman | 1–0 | Kuwait |
|---|---|---|
| Al-Muqbali 69' | Report |

Newcastle Stadium, Newcastle
Attendance: 7,499
Referee: Fahad Al-Mirdasi (Saudi Arabia)

=== Group B ===
| Pos | Team | Pld | W | D | L | GF | GA | GD | Pts | Qualification |
|---|---|---|---|---|---|---|---|---|---|---|
| 1 | China | 3 | 3 | 0 | 0 | 5 | 2 | +3 | 9 | Advance to knockout stage |
| 2 | Uzbekistan | 3 | 2 | 0 | 1 | 5 | 3 | +2 | 6 | Advance to knockout stage |
| 3 | Saudi Arabia | 3 | 1 | 0 | 2 | 5 | 5 | 0 | 3 | |
| 4 | North Korea | 3 | 0 | 0 | 3 | 2 | 7 | −5 | 0 | |

Source: Asian Cup Australia 2015
10 January 2015
18:00 AEDT (UTC+11)

| Uzbekistan | 1–0 | North Korea |
|---|---|---|
| Sergeev 62' | Report |

Stadium Australia, Sydney
Attendance: 12,078
Referee: Nawaf Shukralla (Bahrain)
10 January 2015
19:00 AEST (UTC+10)

| Saudi Arabia | 0–1 | China |
|---|---|---|
| | Report | Yu Hai 81' |

Brisbane Stadium, Brisbane
Attendance: 12,557
Referee: Alireza Faghani (Iran)

14 January 2015
18:00 AEDT (UTC+11)

| North Korea | 1–4 | Saudi Arabia |
|---|---|---|
| Ryang Yong-gi 12' | Report | Hazazi 37'; Al-Sahlawi 52', 54'; Al Abed 76' |

Melbourne Rectangular Stadium, Melbourne
Attendance: 12,349
Referee: Abdullah Al Hilali (Oman)
14 January 2015
19:00 AEST (UTC+10)

| China | 2–1 | Uzbekistan |
|---|---|---|
| Wu Xi 54'; Sun Ke 68' | Report | Ahmedov 23' |

Brisbane Stadium, Brisbane
Attendance: 13,674
Referee: Mohammed Abdulla Hassan Mohamed (United Arab Emirates)

18 January 2015
20:00 AEDT (UTC+11)

| Uzbekistan | 3–1 | Saudi Arabia |
|---|---|---|
| Rashidov 2', 78'; Shodiev 71' | Report | Al-Sahlawi 60' (pen.) |

Melbourne Rectangular Stadium, Melbourne
Attendance: 10,871
Referee: Ben Williams (Australia)
18 January 2015
20:00 AEDT (UTC+11)

| China | 2–1 | North Korea |
|---|---|---|
| Sun Ke 1', 42' | Report | Gao Lin 57' (o.g.) |

Canberra Stadium, Canberra
Attendance: 18,457
Referee: Abdulrahman Abdou (Qatar)

=== Group C ===
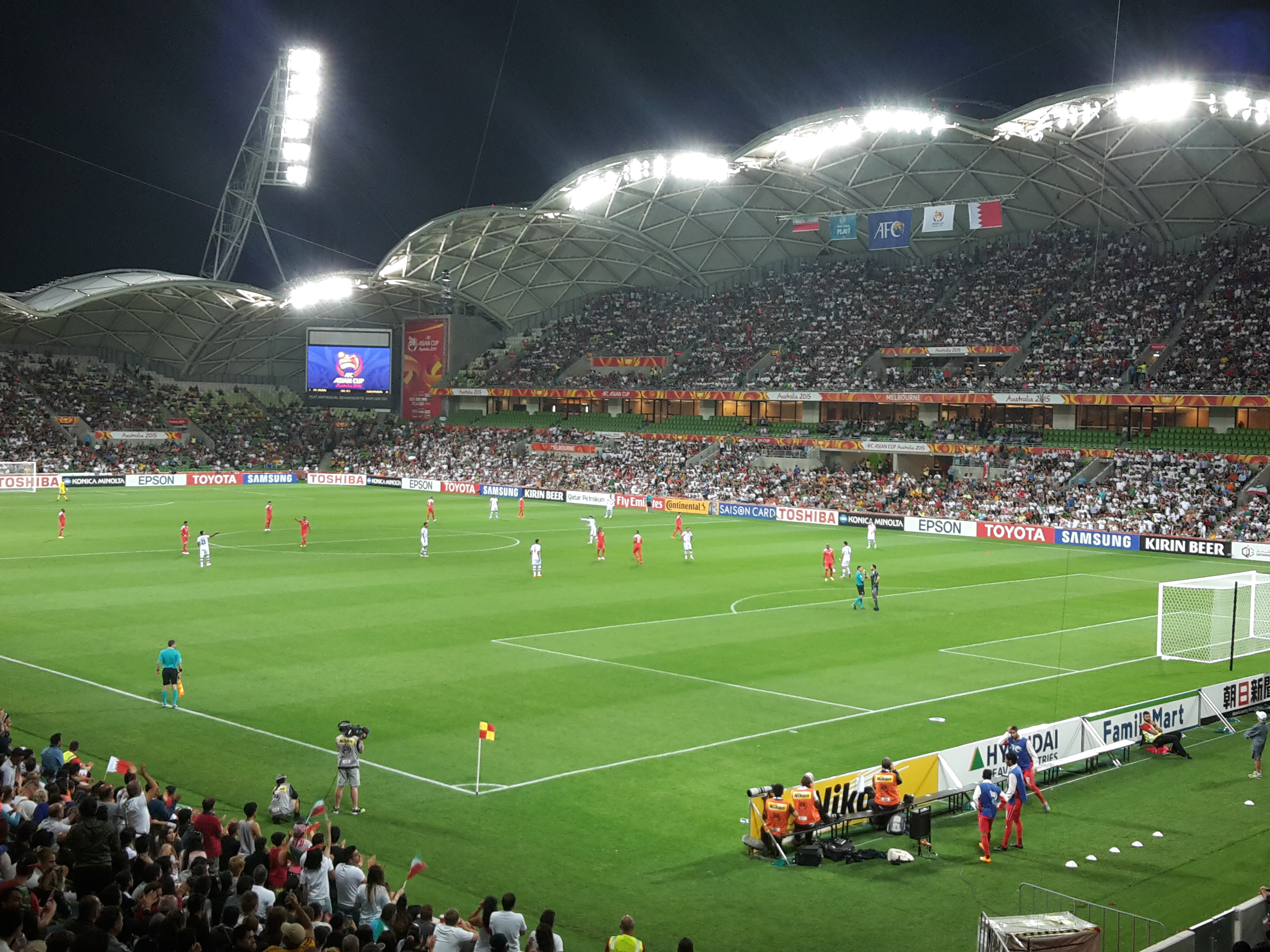
Melbourne Rectangular Stadium during the Iran vs Bahrain match

| Pos | Team | Pld | W | D | L | GF | GA | GD | Pts | Qualification |
|---|---|---|---|---|---|---|---|---|---|---|
| 1 | Iran | 3 | 3 | 0 | 0 | 4 | 0 | +4 | 9 | Advance to knockout stage |
| 2 | United Arab Emirates | 3 | 2 | 0 | 1 | 6 | 3 | +3 | 6 | Advance to knockout stage |
| 3 | Bahrain | 3 | 1 | 0 | 2 | 3 | 5 | −2 | 3 | |
| 4 | Qatar | 3 | 0 | 0 | 3 | 2 | 7 | −5 | 0 | |

Source: Asian Cup Australia 2015
11 January 2015
18:00 AEDT (UTC+11)

| United Arab Emirates | 4–1 | Qatar |
|---|---|---|
| Khalil 37', 52'; Mabkhout 56', 90' | Report | Ibrahim 23' |

Canberra Stadium, Canberra
Attendance: 5,513
Referee: Kim Jong-hyeok (South Korea)
11 January 2015
20:00 AEDT (UTC+11)

| Iran | 2–0 | Bahrain |
|---|---|---|
| Hajsafi 45+1'; Shojaei 71' | Report |

Melbourne Rectangular Stadium, Melbourne
Attendance: 17,712
Referee: Ben Williams (Australia)

15 January 2015
18:00 AEDT (UTC+11)

| Bahrain | 1–2 | United Arab Emirates |
|---|---|---|
| Okwunwanne 26' | Report | Mabkhout 1'; Husain 74' (o.g.) |

Canberra Stadium, Canberra
Attendance: 7,925
Referee: Chris Beath (Australia)
15 January 2015
20:00 AEDT (UTC+11)

| Qatar | 0–1 | Iran |
|---|---|---|
| | Report | Azmoun 52' |

Stadium Australia, Sydney
Attendance: 22,672
Referee: Ravshan Irmatov (Uzbekistan)

19 January 2015
19:00 AEST (UTC+10)

| Iran | 1–0 | United Arab Emirates |
|---|---|---|
| Ghoochannejhad 90+1' | Report |

Brisbane Stadium, Brisbane
Attendance: 11,394
Referee: Ryuji Sato (Japan)
19 January 2015
20:00 AEDT (UTC+11)

| Qatar | 1–2 | Bahrain |
|---|---|---|
| Al-Haydos 68' | Report | Saeed 34'; Ahmed 82' |

Stadium Australia, Sydney
Attendance: 4,841
Referee: Abdullah Al Hilali (Oman)

=== Group D ===
| Pos | Team | Pld | W | D | L | GF | GA | GD | Pts | Qualification |
|---|---|---|---|---|---|---|---|---|---|---|
| 1 | Japan | 3 | 3 | 0 | 0 | 7 | 0 | +7 | 9 | Advance to knockout stage |
| 2 | Iraq | 3 | 2 | 0 | 1 | 3 | 1 | +2 | 6 | Advance to knockout stage |
| 3 | Jordan | 3 | 1 | 0 | 2 | 5 | 4 | +1 | 3 | |
| 4 | Palestine | 3 | 0 | 0 | 3 | 1 | 11 | −10 | 0 | |

Source: Asian Cup Australia 2015
12 January 2015
18:00 AEDT (UTC+11)

| Japan | 4–0 | Palestine |
|---|---|---|
| Endō 8'; Okazaki 25'; Honda 43' (pen.); Yoshida 49' | Report |

Newcastle Stadium, Newcastle
Attendance: 17,147
Referee: Abdulrahman Abdou (Qatar)
12 January 2015
19:00 AEST (UTC+10)

| Jordan | 0–1 | Iraq |
|---|---|---|
| | Report | Kasim 77' |

Brisbane Stadium, Brisbane
Attendance: 6,840
Referee: Fahad Al-Mirdasi (Saudi Arabia)

16 January 2015
18:00 AEDT (UTC+11)

| Palestine | 1–5 | Jordan |
|---|---|---|
| Ihbeisheh 84' | Report | Al-Rawashdeh 32'; Al-Dardour 34', 45+2', 75', 79' |

Melbourne Rectangular Stadium, Melbourne
Attendance: 10,808
Referee: Kim Jong-hyeok (South Korea)
16 January 2015
19:00 AEST (UTC+10)

| Iraq | 0–1 | Japan |
|---|---|---|
| | Report | Honda 23' (pen.) |

Brisbane Stadium, Brisbane
Attendance: 22,941
Referee: Alireza Faghani (Iran)

20 January 2015
20:00 AEDT (UTC+11)

| Japan | 2–0 | Jordan |
|---|---|---|
| Honda 24'; Kagawa 82' | Report |

Melbourne Rectangular Stadium, Melbourne
Attendance: 25,016
Referee: Ravshan Irmatov (Uzbekistan)
20 January 2015
20:00 AEDT (UTC+11)

| Iraq | 2–0 | Palestine |
|---|---|---|
| Mahmoud 48'; Yasin 88' | Report |

Canberra Stadium, Canberra
Attendance: 10,235
Referee: Mohammed Abdulla Hassan Mohamed (United Arab Emirates)

== Knockout stage ==
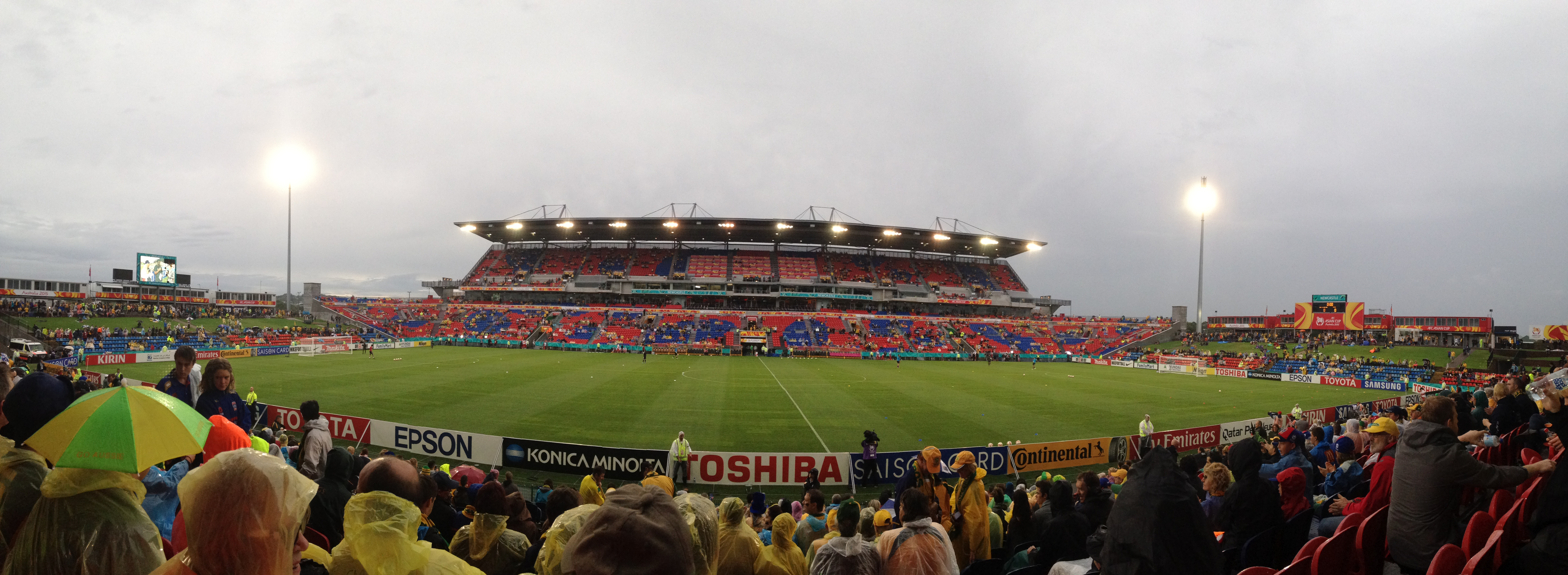
Newcastle Stadium prior the semi-final between Australia and the UAE.

In all matches in the knockout stage, if the score were level at the end of 90 minutes, two 15-minute periods of extra time would take place. If the score were still level after extra time, the match was decided by a penalty shoot-out. Scores after extra time are indicated by (a.e.t.), and penalty shoot-out are indicated by (pen.).

Quarter-finals
22 January – Melbourne
South Korea (a.e.t.) | 2
Uzbekistan | 0
23 January – Canberra
Iran | 3 (6)
Iraq (p) | 3 (7)
22 January – Brisbane
China | 0
Australia | 2
23 January – Sydney
Japan | 1 (4)
United Arab Emirates (p) | 1 (5)

Semi-finals
26 January – Sydney
South Korea | 2
Iraq | 0
27 January – Newcastle
Australia | 2
United Arab Emirates | 0

Final
31 January – Sydney
South Korea | 1
Australia (a.e.t.) | 2
Third place
30 January – Newcastle
Iraq | 2
United Arab Emirates | 3

=== Quarter-finals ===
With a 2–0 victory over Uzbekistan in extra time, South Korea set a tournament record for appearing in ten semi-finals. The host country, Australia, reached the final four for the second consecutive time after overcoming China PR by the same score. Iran were eliminated for the third consecutive time in an Asian Cup quarter-final after Iraq defeated Iran in a penalty shootout. The match had ended 3–3 after extra time, not before a sending off which reduced the Iranians to 10 men late in the first half. The United Arab Emirates eliminated reigning champions Japan through a penalty shoot-out following a 1–1 draw at the end of extra time, marking Japan's worst finish since 1996.

22 January 2015
18:30 AEDT (UTC+11)

| South Korea | 2–0 (a.e.t.) | Uzbekistan |
|---|---|---|
| Son Heung-min 104', 119' | Report |

AAMI Park, Melbourne
Attendance: 23,381
Referee: Fahad Al-Mirdasi (Saudi Arabia)

22 January 2015
20:30 AEST (UTC+10)

| China | 0–2 | Australia |
|---|---|---|
| | Report | Cahill 48', 65' |

Brisbane Stadium, Brisbane
Attendance: 46,067
Referee: Kim Jong-hyeok (South Korea)

23 January 2015
17:30 AEDT (UTC+11)

| Iran | 3–3 (a.e.t.) | Iraq |
|---|---|---|
| Azmoun 24'; Pouraliganji 103'; Ghoochannejhad 119' | Report | Yasin 56'; Mahmoud 93'; Ismail 116' (pen.) |
Penalties
| Hajsafi (penalty missed); Pouraliganji (penalty scored); Nekounam (penalty scored); Hosseini (penalty scored); Ghafouri (penalty scored); Jahanbakhsh (penalty scored); Teymourian (penalty scored); Amiri (penalty missed) | 6–7 | (penalty missed) Abdul-Amir; (penalty scored) Salem; (penalty scored) Ismail; (penalty scored) Adnan; (penalty scored) Mahmoud; (penalty scored) Kasim; (penalty scored) Hussein; (penalty scored) Shaker |

Canberra Stadium, Canberra
Attendance: 18,921
Referee: Ben Williams (Australia)

23 January 2015
20:30 AEDT (UTC+11)

| Japan | 1–1 (a.e.t.) | United Arab Emirates |
|---|---|---|
| Shibasaki 81' | Report | Mabkhout 7' |
Penalties
| Honda (penalty missed); Hasebe (penalty scored); Shibasaki (penalty scored); Toyoda (penalty scored); Morishige (penalty scored); Kagawa (penalty missed) | 4–5 | (penalty scored) O. Abdulrahman; (penalty scored) Mabkhout; (penalty missed) Esmaeel; (penalty scored) Hassan; (penalty scored) Fardan; (penalty scored) I. Ahmed |

Stadium Australia, Sydney
Attendance: 19,094
Referee: Alireza Faghani (Iran)

=== Semi-finals ===
South Korea reached their first final since 1988, after overcoming Iraq 2–0. With a 2–0 victory against the United Arab Emirates, Australia qualified for their second consecutive final out of only three appearances in the Asian Cup since moving to the Asian Football Confederation from the Oceania Football Confederation in 2006.

26 January 2015
20:00 AEDT (UTC+11)

| South Korea | 2–0 | Iraq |
|---|---|---|
| Lee Jeong-hyeop 20'; Kim Young-gwon 50' | Report |

Stadium Australia, Sydney
Attendance: 36,053
Referee: Ryuji Sato (Japan)

27 January 2015
20:00 AEDT (UTC+11)

| Australia | 2–0 | United Arab Emirates |
|---|---|---|
| Sainsbury 3'; Davidson 14' | Report |

Newcastle Stadium, Newcastle
Attendance: 21,079
Referee: Ravshan Irmatov (Uzbekistan)

=== Third place match ===
This was both Iraq's and the United Arab Emirates' second appearances in a third place playoff at the AFC Asian Cup, with the teams contesting in 1976 and 1992 respectively. The United Arab Emirates won the match 3–2 and finished in third-place for the first time.

30 January 2015
20:00 AEDT (UTC+11)

| Iraq | 2–3 | United Arab Emirates |
|---|---|---|
| Salem 28'; Kalaf 42' | Report | Khalil 16', 51'; Mabkhout 57' (pen.) |

Newcastle Stadium, Newcastle
Attendance: 12,829
Referee: Nawaf Shukralla (Bahrain)

=== Final ===
South Korea entered the match looking for their third Asian Cup title, whereas Australia attempted to win their first. After a late goal by Australia in the first half and another late goal by South Korea in the second half, the match was taken into extra time. Australia eventually won the match 2–1.

31 January 2015
20:00 AEDT (UTC+11)

| South Korea | 1–2 (a.e.t.) | Australia |
|---|---|---|
| Son Heung-min 90+1' | Report | Luongo 45'; Troisi 105' |

Stadium Australia, Sydney
Attendance: 76,385
Referee: Alireza Faghani (Iran)

== Statistics ==
=== Goalscorers ===
Ali Mabkhout of the United Arab Emirates received the Golden Boot award for scoring five goals. In total, 85 goals were scored by 57 different players, with two of them credited as own goals.

5 goals

- (United Arab Emirates) Ali Mabkhout

4 goals

- (Jordan) Hamza Al-Dardour
- (United Arab Emirates) Ahmed Khalil

3 goals

- (Australia) Tim Cahill
- (China) Sun Ke
- (Japan) Keisuke Honda
- (Saudi Arabia) Mohammad Al-Sahlawi
- (South Korea) Son Heung-min

2 goals

- (Australia) Massimo Luongo
- (Australia) James Troisi
- (Iran) Sardar Azmoun
- (Iran) Reza Ghoochannejhad
- (Iraq) Younis Mahmoud
- (Iraq) Ahmed Yasin
- (South Korea) Lee Jeong-hyeop
- (Uzbekistan) Sardor Rashidov

1 goal

- (Australia) Jason Davidson
- (Australia) Mile Jedinak
- (Australia) Tomi Juric
- (Australia) Robbie Kruse
- (Australia) Matt McKay
- (Australia) Mark Milligan
- (Australia) Trent Sainsbury
- (Bahrain) Sayed Jaafar Ahmed
- (Bahrain) Jaycee John Okwunwanne
- (Bahrain) Sayed Saeed
- (China) Wu Xi
- (China) Yu Hai
- (Iran) Ehsan Hajsafi
- (Iran) Morteza Pouraliganji
- (Iran) Masoud Shojaei
- (Iraq) Dhurgham Ismail
- (Iraq) Amjad Kalaf
- (Iraq) Yaser Kasim
- (Iraq) Waleed Salem
- (Japan) Yasuhito Endō
- (Japan) Shinji Kagawa
- (Japan) Shinji Okazaki
- (Japan) Gaku Shibasaki
- (Japan) Maya Yoshida
- (Jordan) Yousef Al-Rawashdeh
- (Kuwait) Hussain Fadhel
- (North Korea) Ryang Yong-gi
- (Oman) Abdulaziz Al-Muqbali
- (Palestine) Jaka Ihbeisheh
- (Qatar) Hassan Al-Haydos
- (Qatar) Khalfan Ibrahim
- (Saudi Arabia) Nawaf Al Abed
- (Saudi Arabia) Naif Hazazi
- (South Korea) Cho Young-cheol
- (South Korea) Kim Young-gwon
- (South Korea) Nam Tae-hee
- (Uzbekistan) Odil Ahmedov
- (Uzbekistan) Igor Sergeev
- (Uzbekistan) Vokhid Shodiev

1 own goal

- (Bahrain) Mohamed Husain (against United Arab Emirates)
- (China) Gao Lin (against North Korea)

=== Assists ===
4 assists

- (Australia) Massimo Luongo
- (United Arab Emirates) Omar Abdulrahman

3 assists

- (Bahrain) Faouzi Aaish
- (Iran) Andranik Teymourian

2 assists

- (Australia) Ivan Franjic
- (Iraq) Alaa Abdul-Zahra
- (Japan) Shinji Kagawa
- (Jordan) Abdallah Deeb
- (South Korea) Cha Du-ri
- (South Korea) Kim Jin-su
- (United Arab Emirates) Amer Abdulrahman

1 assist

- (Australia) Jason Davidson
- (Australia) Matthew Leckie
- (Australia) Trent Sainsbury
- (Australia) Tomi Juric
- (China) Gao Lin
- (China) Zheng Zhi
- (China) Jiang Zhipeng
- (Iran) Ashkan Dejagah
- (Iran) Vouria Ghafouri
- (Iraq) Ali Adnan
- (Iraq) Dhurgham Ismail
- (Iraq) Amjad Kalaf
- (Iraq) Waleed Salem
- (Iraq) Ahmed Yasin
- (Japan) Keisuke Honda
- (Japan) Takashi Inui
- (Japan) Yoshinori Muto
- (Jordan) Hamza Al-Dardour
- (Jordan) Saeed Murjan
- (Jordan) Oday Zahran
- (Kuwait) Abdulaziz Al Misha'an
- (Oman) Mohammed Al-Siyabi
- (Saudi Arabia) Nawaf Al Abed
- (Saudi Arabia) Abdullah Al-Zori
- (South Korea) Ki Sung-yueng
- (South Korea) Lee Jeong-hyeop
- (South Korea) Lee Keun-ho
- (Uzbekistan) Server Djeparov
- (Uzbekistan) Jasur Hasanov
- (Uzbekistan) Timur Kapadze
- (Uzbekistan) Shavkat Mullajanov

=== Discipline ===
In the final tournament, a player was suspended for the subsequent match in the competition for either getting red card or accumulating two yellow cards in two different matches. The match review panel has the ability to increase the automatic one match ban for a red card (e.g. for violent conduct). Single yellow card cautions were erased at the conclusion of the quarter-finals, and were not carried over to the semi-finals (so that a player could only be suspended for the final by getting a red card in the semi-final). The following players were or are suspended during the final tournament – for one or more games – as a result of red cards or yellow card accumulations:

| Player | Offence | Suspension |
|---|---|---|
| (Kuwait) Fahad Awadh | (yellow card) in qualification vs Iran; (yellow card) in qualification vs Iran | Group A vs Australia |
| (Uzbekistan) Islom Tukhtakhodjaev | (yellow card) (yellow-red card) in qualification vs United Arab Emirates | Group B vs North Korea |
| (North Korea) Ri Sang-chol | Unsporting conduct towards a match official (Note: Offence committed in 2012 Summer Olympics second round qualification vs United Arab Emirates.) | Group B vs Uzbekistan; Group B vs Saudi Arabia; Group B vs China PR |
| (Saudi Arabia) Fahad Al-Muwallad | (yellow card) in qualification vs China PR; (yellow card) in qualification vs Indonesia | Group B vs China PR |
| (China) Sun Ke | (yellow card) in qualification vs Iraq; (yellow card) in qualification vs Iraq | Group B vs Saudi Arabia |
| (Palestine) Ahmed Harbi | (yellow card) (yellow-red card) in Group D vs Japan | Group D vs Jordan |
| (Jordan) Anas Bani Yaseen | (yellow card) (yellow-red card) in Group D vs Iraq | Group D vs Palestine |
| (North Korea) Ri Yong-jik | (red card) in Group B vs Saudi Arabia | Group B vs China PR |
| (China) Ren Hang | (yellow card) in Group B vs Saudi Arabia; (yellow card) in Group B vs Uzbekistan | Group B vs North Korea |
| (Iraq) Alaa Abdul-Zahra | (yellow card) in Group D vs Jordan; (yellow card) in Group D vs Japan | Group D vs Palestine |
| (Australia) Matthew Spiranovic | (yellow card) in Group A vs Oman; (yellow card) in Group A vs South Korea | Quarter-final vs China PR |
| (United Arab Emirates) Walid Abbas | (yellow card) in Group C vs Qatar; (yellow card) in Group C vs Iran | Quarter-final vs Japan |
| (Iran) Mehrdad Pooladi | (yellow card) (yellow-red card) in Quarter-final vs Iraq | World Cup qualifying vs Turkmenistan |
| (Iraq) Yaser Kasim | (yellow card) in Group D vs Jordan; (yellow card) in Quarter-final vs Iran | Semi-final vs South Korea |
| (Iraq) Ahmad Ibrahim | (red card) in Third place match vs United Arab Emirates | World Cup qualifying vs Chinese Taipei |

=== Awards ===
Most Valuable Player

- (Australia) Massimo Luongo

Top Goalscorer

- (United Arab Emirates) Ali Mabkhout

Best Goalkeeper

- (Australia) Mathew Ryan

Fair Play Award

- Australia

Team of the Tournament

Four players from both the winning Australian team and the runner-up South Korean team were selected in the team of the tournament by the organization committee, while the other players included were from a team which progressed to the semi-finals.

The Team of the Tournament

| Goalkeeper | Defenders | Midfielders | Forwards |
|---|---|---|---|
| (Australia) Mathew Ryan | (Iraq) Dhurgham Ismail (South Korea) Kwak Tae-hwi (Australia) Trent Sainsbury (South Korea) Cha Du-ri | (South Korea) Ki Sung-yueng (United Arab Emirates) Omar Abdulrahman (Australia) Massimo Luongo (Australia) Tim Cahill | (South Korea) Son Heung-min (United Arab Emirates) Ali Mabkhout |

=== Final standings ===
| Pos. | Team | G | Pld | W | D | L | Pts | GF | GA | GD |
|---|---|---|---|---|---|---|---|---|---|---|
| 1 | Australia | A | 6 | 5 | 0 | 1 | 15 | 14 | 3 | +11 |
| 2 | South Korea | A | 6 | 5 | 0 | 1 | 15 | 8 | 2 | +6 |
| 3 | United Arab Emirates | C | 6 | 3 | 1 | 2 | 10 | 10 | 8 | +2 |
| 4 | Iraq | D | 6 | 2 | 1 | 3 | 7 | 8 | 9 | −1 |
Eliminated in the quarter-finals
| 5 | Iran | C | 4 | 3 | 1 | 0 | 10 | 7 | 3 | +4 |
| 6 | Japan | D | 4 | 3 | 1 | 0 | 10 | 8 | 1 | +7 |
| 7 | China | B | 4 | 3 | 0 | 1 | 9 | 5 | 4 | +1 |
| 8 | Uzbekistan | B | 4 | 2 | 0 | 2 | 6 | 5 | 5 | 0 |
Eliminated in group stage
| 9 | Jordan | D | 3 | 1 | 0 | 2 | 3 | 5 | 4 | +1 |
| 10 | Saudi Arabia | B | 3 | 1 | 0 | 2 | 3 | 5 | 5 | 0 |
| 11 | Bahrain | C | 3 | 1 | 0 | 2 | 3 | 3 | 5 | −2 |
| 12 | Oman | A | 3 | 1 | 0 | 2 | 3 | 1 | 5 | −4 |
| 13 | Qatar | C | 3 | 0 | 0 | 3 | 0 | 2 | 7 | −5 |
| 14 | North Korea | B | 3 | 0 | 0 | 3 | 0 | 2 | 7 | −5 |
| 15 | Kuwait | A | 3 | 0 | 0 | 3 | 0 | 1 | 6 | −5 |
| 16 | Palestine | D | 3 | 0 | 0 | 3 | 0 | 1 | 11 | −10 |

Source: AFC Technical Report

== Records ==
The 2015 Asian Cup achieved 26 consecutive matches without a draw, the most of any major football tournament, breaking the previous record of 18 set at the 1930 FIFA World Cup in Uruguay.

Ali Mabkhout broke the record for fastest goal at the AFC Asian Cup, scoring after just 14 seconds for the United Arab Emirates against Bahrain in their group stage match.

Palestine made its first ever appearance in the Asian Cup, and Jaka Ihbeisheh scored the nation's first ever goal in an Asian Cup in their second group match against Jordan. This goal also marked for the first time a Slovene scored in an Asian Cup game, as Jaka's being Slovenian descent.

With the title, Australia became the first men's national team to win titles in two different confederations, having won the OFC Nations Cup four times before moving to the AFC. Tim Cahill and Mark Bresciano became the first men's players to win two different confederation titles, having previously won the 2004 OFC Nations Cup. By winning the Asian Cup, Australia also became the first country to simultaneously hold the AFC Asian Cup and AFC Champions League titles, following the triumph of Western Sydney Wanderers in the 2014 AFC Champions League.

== Marketing ==
=== Trophy tour ===
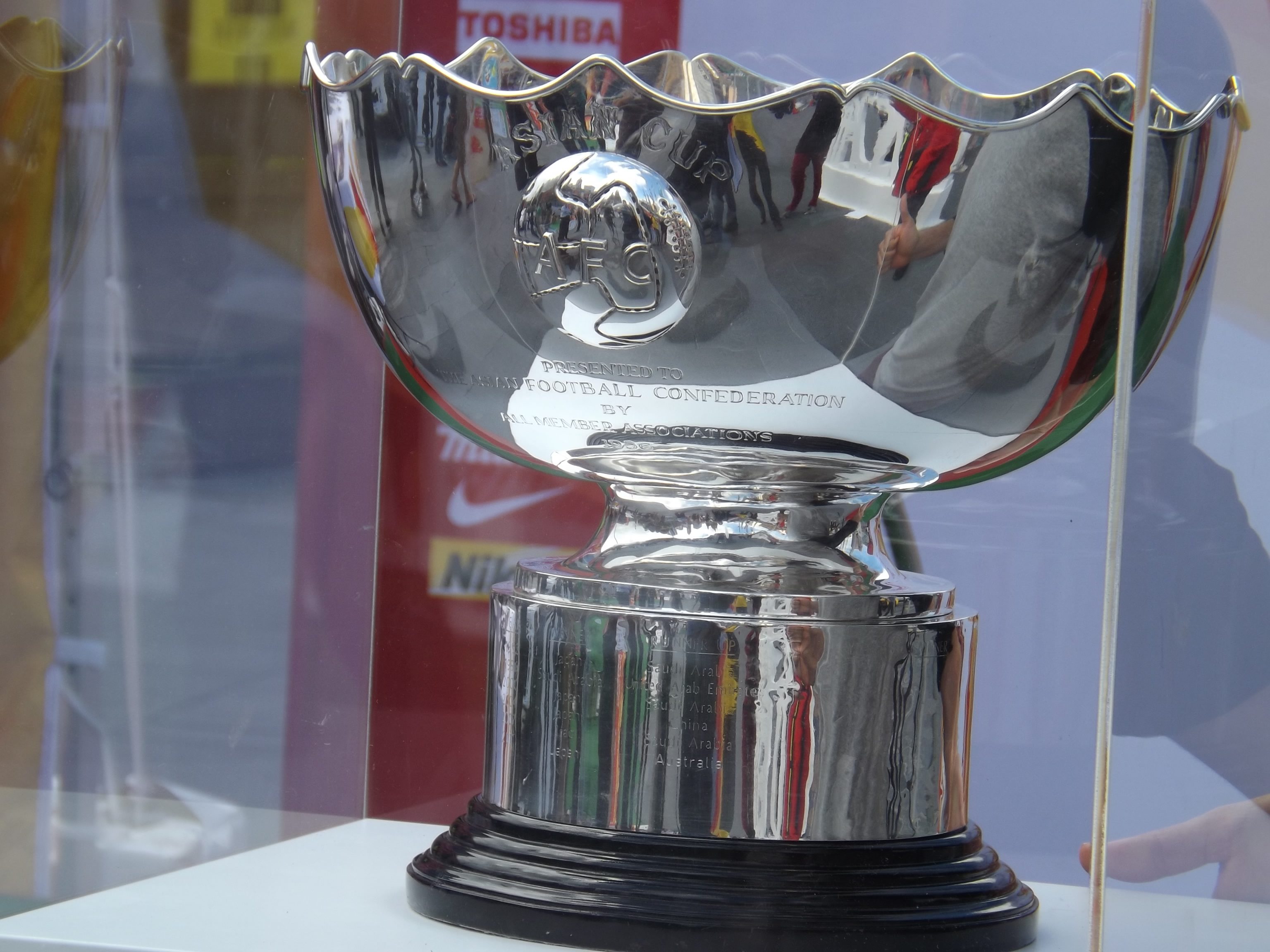
The Asian Cup on tour at Federation Square

The Trophy Tour commenced in China in September 2014, it then travelled to Qatar, United Arab Emirates, South Korea and Japan before arriving in Australia in December, where the trophy made it to all five 2015 AFC Asian Cup host cities.

=== Opening ceremony ===
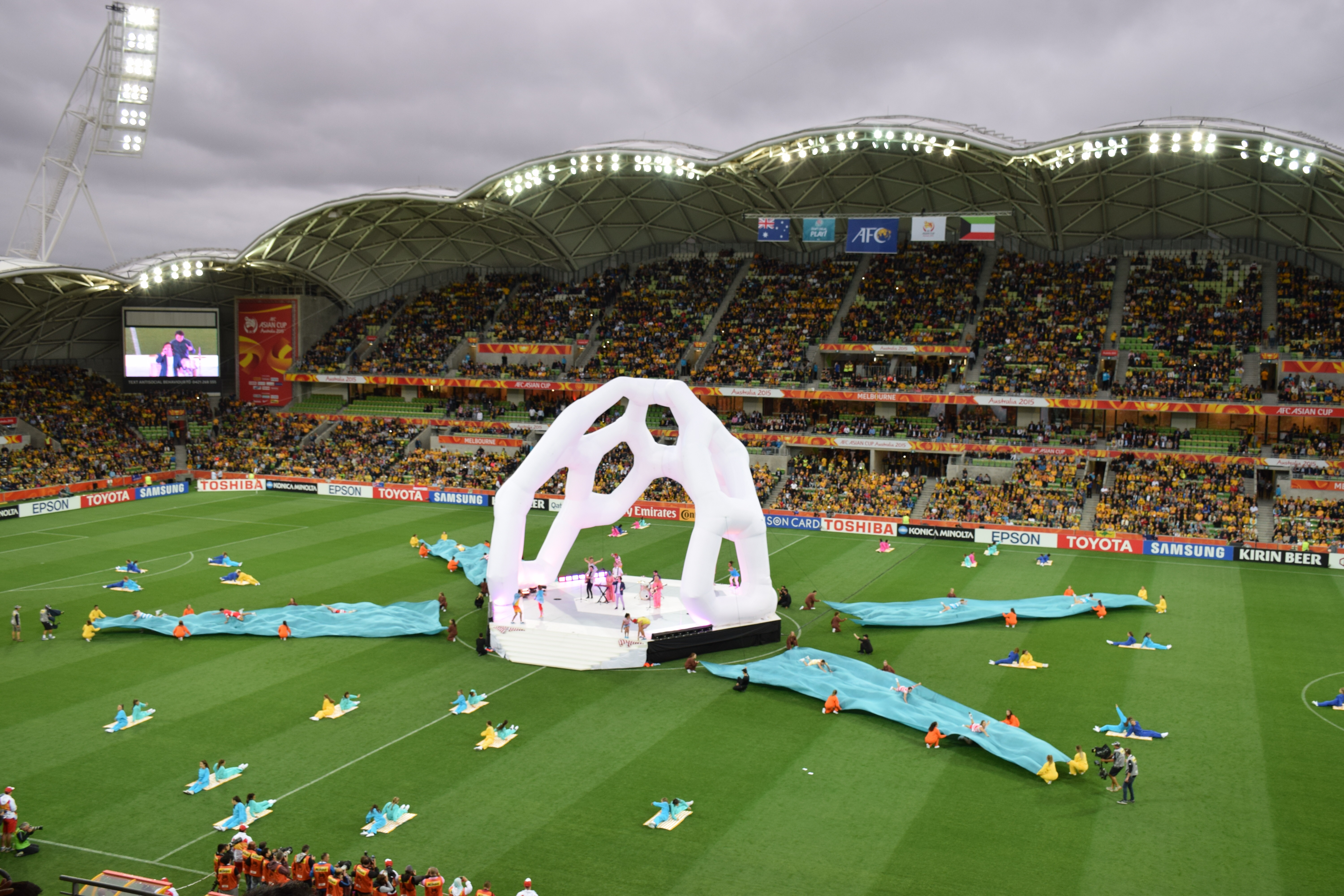
Asian Cup opening ceremony

The opening ceremony of the 2015 AFC Asian Cup took place on 9 January, at the Melbourne Rectangular Stadium, before the opening match of the tournament between hosts Australia and Kuwait. The ceremony was produced by a consortium of sport event specialists Twenty3 Sports + Entertainment and creative technology firm Spinifex Group. The consortium has worked on the main international sporting events including the 2010 Winter Olympics and the 2008 Summer Olympics opening ceremony. The opening ceremony for the Asian Cup directed by Peter Nielson with Musical Direction by Chong Lim, and featured performances by Australian DJ, singer and dancer Havana Brown, Australian indie pop band Sheppard, Indigenous Australian musician Geoffrey Gurrumul Yunupingu, and Australian hip-hop artists L-Fresh The Lion, Joelistics and Mistress of Ceremony. It also featured 80 children from local junior football clubs and a performing cast of more than 120 Australian dancers, acrobats, Indigenous performers and football freestylers.

=== Logo and mascot ===
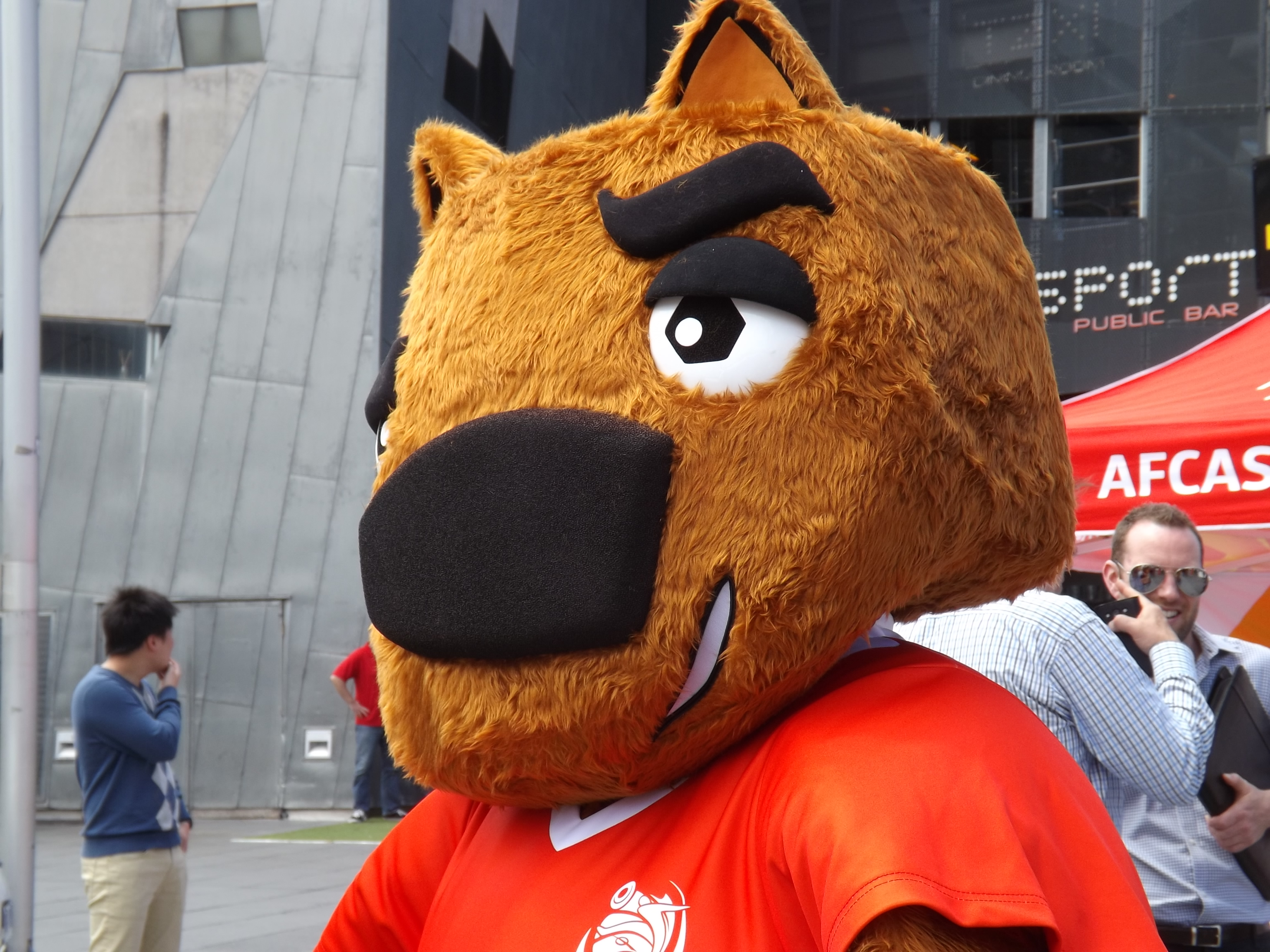
Nutmeg the Wombat, mascot of the cup at Federation Square

The official logo for the tournament was unveiled at a special event in Melbourne, in October 2012. Designed by Sydney agency, WiteKite. The logo depicts a stylised player, kicking a football from the east coast of Australia across country towards Asia. The ball also represents the Australian summer sun arcing west from Australia to Asia. The four golden bands forming the map of Australia represent the four host cities. The design is embraced by the AFC holding device.

The mascot of the tournament, "Nutmeg the Wombat", was unveiled at the Wild Life Sydney Zoo, on 11 November 2014. The mascot, a wombat native to Australia, wore the colours of the 2015 AFC Asian Cup, red and yellow. It was named after the football trick where a player dribbles the ball through an opponent's legs, known as a nutmeg.

=== Song ===
Theme song was Warrior by Havana Brown.

=== Sponsorship ===
AFC announced ten official sponsors and six official supporters as shown below.

| Official sponsors | Official supporters |
|---|---|
| Continental; Fly Emirates; Epson; Kirin; Konica Minolta; QatarEnergy; Saison Card; Samsung Electronics; Toshiba; Toyota | Asahi Shimbun; FamilyMart; Hyundai Heavy Industries; Makita; Nike; Nikon Corporation |

== Broadcasting ==
The tournament was broadcast live by around 80 TV channels covering the whole world. 800 million people were expected to watch matches, with the tournament reaching a potential TV audience of more than 2.5 billion people. Below is the list of confirmed broadcasting right holders for 2015 AFC Asian Cup.

| Territory | Channel | Ref |
|---|---|---|
| Arab League | beIN Sports | |
| Asia-Pacific | Fox International Channels | |
| Australia | Fox Sports, ABC | |
| Brazil | SporTV | |
| China | CCTV | |
| Europe | Eurosport | |
| Hong Kong | Now TV | |
| India | Star Sports | |
| Indonesia | Sindo TV | |
| Iran | IRIB | |
| Japan | TV Asahi, NHK BS1 | |
| Malaysia | TV3 | |
| New Zealand | Sky Sport | |
| North America | ONE World Sports | |
| South Africa | SABC | |
| South Korea | KBS, SBS, MBC | |
| Thailand | Channel 7 | |
| Philippines | ABS-CBN Sports+Action | |
| United States | One World Sports | |
| Uzbekistan | SPORT-UZ | |

== Controversies ==
Due to a hostage taking in Sydney in December 2014, security was increased for all team bases and stadiums, in addition to police escorts for all official activities.

During a doping test, Jordan's Ahmad Hayel was required to drink so much water to produce a urine sample, that he developed hypothermia and was rendered unconscious. Jordan coach Ray Wilkins was infuriated at Asian Cup officials over the procedure.

On 24 January 2015, following the country's elimination from the tournament, it was revealed that the Iranian Football Federation (FFIRI) had lodged a formal complaint to FIFA against their quarter-final opponent. The complaint was regarding the eligibility of Iraqi midfielder Alaa Abdul-Zahra, with the FFIRI arguing that the player should not have been allowed to play due to him submitting a positive doping test while playing for an Iranian club side in 2014. According to documents seen by Agence France-Presse, the 27-year-old tested positive for the banned stimulant methylhexanamine, in results that were verified by a WADA-approved laboratory in Cologne. In an email exchange dated September 2014, FIFA promised to take action, but there is no record of a suspension for Abdul-Zahra. The Iranian national team remained in Australia whilst awaiting a response from FIFA and a final decision by the AFC disciplinary committee. On 25 January, the AFC disciplinary committee decided that the FFIRI protest was unfounded, and, therefore, dismissed the case, with Iraq, cleared to take its place in their semi-final match against South Korea the following day.

On 29 January 2015, after the defeat of Iraq and the United Arab Emirates during the 2015 AFC Asian Cup, West Asian Football Federation members reportedly sought to remove Australia from the AFC primarily due to "Australia benefiting hugely from Asian involvement without giving much in return". The resentment grew in the aftermath of Australia's conquest of the tournament.
