= Mohammad Mustafa (footballer, born 1989) =

Jordanian footballer

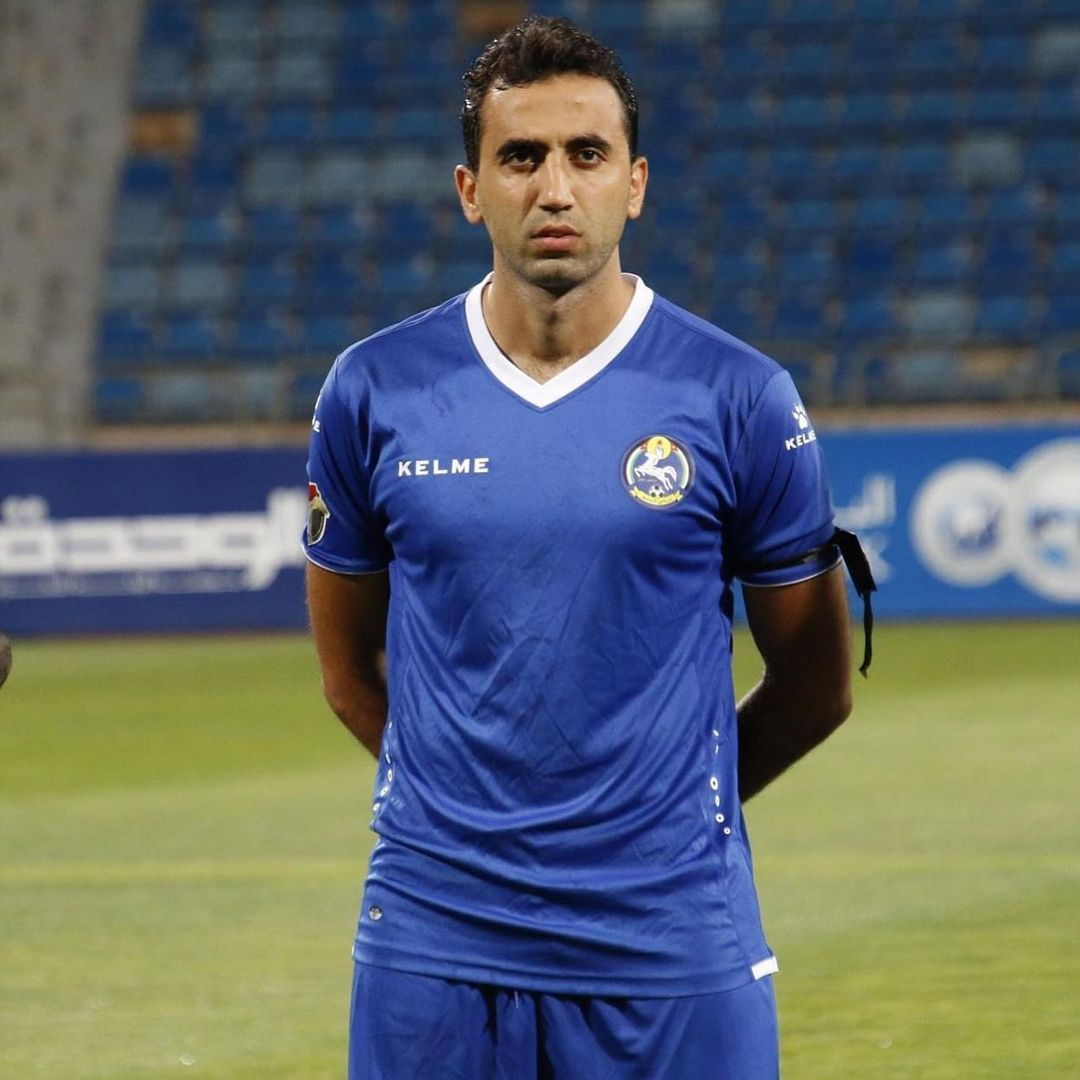

Personal information
- Full name: Mohammad Ali Mustafa
- Date of birth: 29 October 1989 (age 37)
- Place of birth: Amman, Jordan
- Height: 1.85 m (6 ft 1 in)
- Position: Defender

Team information
- Current team: Dougra

Youth career
- 2003–2005: Al-Kharaitiyat
- 2005–2008: Al-Jazeera

Senior career*
Years	Team	Apps	(Gls)
2008–2015	Al-Jazeera		(3)
2012	→ Al-Muharraq (loan)		(0)
2013–2014	→ Al-Shoalah (loan)		(1)
2014–2016	→ Al-Khor (loan)		
2016–2018	Al-Wehdat		(3)
2018–2020	Shabab Al-Ordon		
2020–2022	Al-Salt		
2024–	Dougra		

International career^{‡}
2010–2011	Jordan U23		
2011–2015	Jordan	44	(0)
- * Club domestic league appearances and goals as of 4 May 2018 ‡ National team caps and goals as of 16 June 2015

Mohammad Ali Mustafa (Arabic: محمد علي مصطفى; born October 29, 1989) is a Jordanian footballer who plays as a defender for Jordanian Pro League club Dougra.

== Career ==
He played his first international match with the Jordan national senior team against Nepal in a 2014 WC qualifying game in Kathmandu on 28 July 2011 when he entered as a substitute for his teammate Suleiman Al-Salman. The match ended in a 1–1 draw between the two teams.
