= 2014–15 Palestine Cup =

2013–14 Palestine Cup
Tournament details
- Country: Palestine

Final positions
- Champions: Ahli Al-Khaleel
- Runners-up: Markaz Balata

The 2014–15 Palestine Cup was the 2014–15 edition of the Palestine Cup. The cup winner qualified for the 2016 AFC Cup.

== Quarter-finals ==
21 March 2015	Shabab Al-Khadr	0 – 2	Shabab Al-Am'ari	Jericho
(UTC+2)		Summary	Samara 67'; H.Hassanein 80'	Stadium: Areha; Referee: Ibrahim Gharouf

21 March 2015	Ahli Al-Khaleel	6 – 0	Jabal Al-Mukaber	Al-Ram
(UTC+2)	M.Salem 3'; K.Elhalman 41'; H.Johar 53'; M.Dawod 75'; F.Esaly 85'; W.Merasat 90'	Summary		Stadium: Faisal Al-Husseini International Stadium; Referee: Jawad Assi

23 March 2015	Shabab Al-Dhahiriya	0 – 0 (2 – 4 p)	Taraji Wadi Al-Nes	Hebron
(UTC+2)		Summary		Stadium: AlHousin; Referee: Imad Boja

24 March 2015	Markaz Balata	4 – 0	Om Toba	al-Bireh
(UTC+2)	M.Lail 55', 58', 81'; A.Rowias 75' (pen.)	Summary		Stadium: Majed Assad; Referee: Nasir Albalbol

== Semi-finals ==
28 March 2015	Shabab Al-Am'ari	0 – 1	Markaz Balata	Jericho
(UTC+3)		Summary	F.Lafy 78'	Stadium: Areha; Referee: Ibrahim Gharouf

22 April 2015	Ahli Al-Khaleel	0 – 0 (7 – 6 p)	Taraji Wadi Al-Nes	Al-Ram
(UTC+3)	W.Merasat (yellow card) 18'; M.Mazer (yellow card) 89'	Summary	S.Hammad (yellow card) 18'; R.Hammad (yellow card) 85'	Stadium: Faisal Al-Husseini International Stadium; Referee: Husam Alhussein
	Penalties
	W.Merasat (penalty missed); J.Allan (penalty scored); H.Johar (penalty scored); F.Esaly (penalty scored); K.Elhalman (penalty scored); A.Alshewaky (penalty scored); E.Alakawi (penalty scored); R.Salhli (penalty scored)		(penalty missed) Yousef; (penalty scored) A.Kharbat; (penalty scored) A.Hammad; (penalty scored) Has.Hammad; (penalty scored) S.Hammad; (penalty scored) Al-Sobakhi; (penalty scored) Haz.Hammad; (penalty missed) Zidan

== Final ==
8 May 2015
(UTC+3)

Markaz Balata	0 – 0 (a.e.t.)	Ahli Al-Khaleel
W.Abbas (yellow card) 34'; F.Lafy (yellow card) 44'	Summary
Penalties
Abuhabib (penalty scored); W.Abbas (penalty missed); M.Warda (penalty missed); A.Mosaed (penalty scored); O.Ordoneyah (penalty missed); A.Rowias (penalty scored); B.Albadersawi (penalty missed)	3 – 4	(penalty missed) J.Allan; (penalty scored) K.Elhalman; (penalty missed) H.Johar; (penalty missed) E.Alakawi; (penalty scored) Maher; (penalty scored) A.Alshewaky; (penalty scored) F.Esaly

Faisal Al-Husseini International Stadium, Al-Ram
Referee: Imad Boja
