= 2013–14 Palestine Cup =

Tournament details
- Country: Palestine

Final positions
- Champions: Hilal Al-Quds Club
- Runners-up: Shabab Al-Dhahiriya SC

The 2013–14 Palestine Cup was the 2013–14 edition of the Palestine Cup. The cup winner qualified for the 2015 AFC Cup.

== Final ==
11 April 2014

Shabab Al-Dhahiriya SC	1–1	Hilal Al-Quds Club
	Report
Penalties
	2–4

Al-Khader Stadium, Bethlehem
