= Ahmed Harbi =

Palestine footballer (born 1986)

Personal information
- Date of birth: 16 July 1986 (age 40)
- Place of birth: Umm al-Fahm, Israel
- Height: 5 ft 8 in (1.73 m)
- Position: Full-back

Team information
- Current team: Maccabi Ahi Iksal

Youth career
- Beitar Tubruk

Senior career*
Years	Team	Apps	(Gls)
2005–2009	Beitar Tubruk	0	(0)
2005–2006	→ Hapoel Umm al-Fahm	0	(0)
2006–2007	→ Hapoel Haifa	11	(1)
2007	→ Hapoel Umm al-Fahm		
2007	→ Maccabi Umm al-Fahm	24	(0)
2005–2006	→ Hapoel Umm al-Fahm	0	(0)
2008	→ Sektzia Ness Ziona	20	(0)
2008–2009	→ Hapoel Umm al-Fahm	0	(0)
2009–2012	Al-Am'ary	36	(6)
2012–2013	Maccabi Umm al-Fahm	18	(1)
2013	→ Hapoel Bnei Lod (loan)	18	(1)
2013–2015	Al-Am'ari	24	(5)
2015–2017	Ahli Al-Khaleel		
2017–2018	Shabab Al-Dhahiriya		
2018–2020	Shabab Alsamu	12	(1)
2020–2021	Maccabi Umm al-Fahm	8	(0)
2021–2023	Maccabi Ahi Iksal	2	(0)

International career
2010–2015	Palestine	29	(1)
- * Club domestic league appearances and goals as of 13 December 2024

Ahmed Harbi Mahajna (Arabic: أحمد حربي محاجنة, Hebrew: אחמד מחאג'נה; born 16 July 1986), simply known as Ahmed Harbi, is a footballer who plays for Maccabi Ahi Iksal as a full-back. Born in Israel, he played for the Palestine national team.

== International career ==
He received his first call up to the Palestine national team in 2010 against Sudan. He has since played for Palestine at the 2010 WAFF Championship, the qualifying rounds of 2012 AFC Challenge Cup, 2014 World Cup qualifying and the 2015 AFC Asian Cup. He scored his first goal for the national team against Myanmar in the final game of 2012 AFC Challenge Cup qualifying. He was the first player to be sent off in the 2015 AFC Asian Cup.

== Career statistics ==
=== International ===
Appearances and goals by national team and year
National team	Year	Apps	Goals
Palestine	2010	3	0
Palestine	2011	9	1
Palestine	2012	6	0
Palestine	2013	1	0
Palestine	2014	6	0
Palestine	2015	4	0
Total		29	1

Scores and results list Palestine's goal tally first, score column indicates score after each Harbi goal.

List of international goals scored by Ahmed Harbi
No.	Date	Venue	Opponent	Score	Result	Competition
1	25 March 2011	Thuwunna Stadium, Yangon, Myanmar	Myanmar	2–1	3–1	2012 AFC Challenge Cup qualification
