= Ahmad Elias =

Jordanian footballer

Personal information
- Full name: Ahmad Ali Elias
- Date of birth: 9 November 1990 (age 35)
- Place of birth: Amman, Jordan
- Height: 1.74 m (5 ft 9 in)
- Positions: Midfielder; left back

Team information
- Current team: Shabab Al-Ordon
- Number: 18

Youth career
- 2004–2009: Al-Wehdat

Senior career*
Years	Team	Apps	(Gls)
2009–2023	Al-Wehdat		
2023	Jabal Al-Mukaber		
2023–2024	Al-Ahli		
2024	Ma'an		
2025–	Shabab Al-Ordon		

International career^{‡}
2007–2008	Jordan U19		(0)
2010–2011	Jordan U23		(1)
2012–2016	Jordan	11	(0)
- * Club domestic league appearances and goals as of 31 July 2025 ‡ National team caps and goals as of 15 November 2016

Ahmad Ali Elias (Arabic: أحمد علي إلياس) (born 1990) is a Jordanian footballer who plays for the Jordanian club Shabab Al-Ordon.

== International career ==
Elias's first international match with the Jordan national senior team was against Syria, when he entered as a substitute for his teammate Adnan Adous, on 16 December 2012 in the 2012 WAFF Championship in which Jordan lost 2–1.

== International goals ==
=== With U-23 ===
#	Date	Venue	Opponent	Score	Result	Competition
1	12 June 2011	Amman	Turkmenistan	3–2	Win	Friendly

== International career statistics ==
As of 15 November 2016

Jordan national team
Year	Apps	Goals
2012	1	0
2014	2	0
2015	5	0
2016	3	0
Total	11	0
