= Hesham Salhe =

Palestinian footballer

Personal information
- Full name: Hesham Salhe
- Date of birth: 8 November 1987 (age 39)
- Place of birth: Gaza, Palestine
- Position: Midfielder

Senior career*
Years	Team	Apps	(Gls)
2012–2015	Hilal Al-Quds		
2015–2017	Shabab Al-Am'ari		
2017–2019	Abna Al-Quds		

International career^{‡}
2009–2015	Palestine	17	(1)
- * Club domestic league appearances and goals as of 4 June 2018 ‡ National team caps and goals as of January 20, 2015

Hesham Salhe (Arabic: هشام الصالحي; born 8 November 1987) is a Palestinian professional footballer who plays as a midfielder for Hilal Al-Quds.
