= Oday Zahran =

Jordanian footballer

Personal information
- Full name: Oday Samir Zahran
- Date of birth: 29 January 1991 (age 35)
- Place of birth: Amman, Jordan
- Height: 1.71 m (5 ft 7 in)
- Position: Right back

Team information
- Current team: Al-Hashemiya

Youth career
- 2007–2009: Shabab Al-Ordon

Senior career*
Years	Team	Apps	(Gls)
2009–2016	Shabab Al-Ordon	77	(10)
2016–2022	Al-Faisaly		
2022–2023	Sahab		
2023–2024	Al-Baqa'a		
2024–	Al-Hashemiya		

International career^{‡}
2008–2010	Jordan U19		
2012–2014	Jordan U22		
2010–2011	Jordan U23		
2012–	Jordan	57	(0)
- * Club domestic league appearances and goals ‡ National team caps and goals as of 20 May 2018

Oday Samir Zahran (Arabic: عدي سمير زهران) is a Jordanian footballer who plays for Jordanian First Division League club Al-Hashemiya and a former Jordan national football team player.

== International career ==
Zahran's first international match with the Jordan national senior team was against Iraq on 10 December 2012 in the 2012 WAFF Championship, which resulted in a 1–0 loss for Jordan.

== International career statistics ==
As of 9 December 2017

Jordan national team
Year	Apps	Goals
2012	2	0
2013	14	0
2014	13	0
2015	17	0
2016	3	0
2017	4	0
2018	1	0
Total	54	0
