= Philippines national football team results (2010–2019) =

This is a list of the Philippines national football team results from 2010 to 2019.

== Results ==
=== 2010 ===
16 January Friendly	Chinese Taipei	0–0	Philippines	Kaohsiung, Taiwan
18:00 (UTC+8)		Report		Stadium: Kaohsiung National Stadium

10 October 2010 Long Teng Cup	Chinese Taipei	1–1	Philippines	Kaohsiung, Taiwan
19:30 (UTC+8)	Lo Chih-an 48'	Report	Araneta 90+3'	Stadium: Kaohsiung National Stadium; Attendance: 890; Referee: Kao Tsai-hu (Chinese Taipei)

12 October 2010 Long Teng Cup	Philippines	5–0	Macau	Kaohsiung, Taiwan
17:00 (UTC+8)	Caligdong 6'; Araneta 13', 54', 90'; J. Younghusband 48'	Report		Stadium: Kaohsiung National Stadium; Attendance: 700; Referee: Yu Ming-hsun (Chinese Taipei)

22 October 2010 AFF Championship qualification	Timor-Leste	0–5	Philippines	Vientiane, Laos
16:00 (UTC+7)		Report	Araneta 27', 41', 57'; P. Younghusband 30' (pen.); Del Rosario 32'	Stadium: New Laos National Stadium; Referee: Leow Thiam Hoe (Singapore)

24 October 2010 AFF Championship qualification	Laos	2–2	Philippines	Vientiane, Laos
18:30 (UTC+7)	Vongchiengkham 28'; Sysomvang 40'	Report	P. Younghusband 76' (pen.); J. Younghusband 90+4'	Stadium: New Laos National Stadium; Referee: Mongkolchai Pechsri (Thailand)

26 October 2010 AFF Championship qualification	Philippines	0–0	Cambodia	Vientiane, Laos
16:00 (UTC+7)		Report		Stadium: New Laos National Stadium; Referee: Mohd Nafeez Abdul Wahab (Malaysia)

2 December 2010 AFF Championship GS	Singapore	1–1	Philippines	Hanoi, Vietnam
17:00 (UTC+7)	Đurić 65'	Report	C. Greatwich 90+3'	Stadium: Mỹ Đình National Stadium; Referee: Chaiya Mahapab (Thailand)

5 December 2010 AFF Championship GS	Philippines	2–0	Vietnam	Hanoi, Vietnam
19:30 (UTC+7)	C. Greatwich 38'; P. Younghusband 79'	Report		Stadium: Mỹ Đình National Stadium; Attendance: 40,000; Referee: Jimmy Napitupulu (Indonesia)

8 December 2010 AFF Championship GS	Myanmar	0–0	Philippines	Nam Định, Vietnam
19:30 (UTC+7)		Report		Stadium: Thiên Trường Stadium; Referee: Pratap Singh (India)

16 December 2010 AFF Championship SF 1st leg	Philippines	0–1 (Note: This match was supposed to be played in the Philippines but was moved to Jakarta due to the unavailability of a stadium that meets AFF regulations.)	Indonesia	Jakarta, Indonesia
19:00 (UTC+7)		Report	Gonzáles 32'	Stadium: Gelora Bung Karno Stadium; Attendance: 70,000; Referee: Masoud Moradi (Iran)

19 December 2010 AFF Championship SF 2nd leg	Indonesia	1–0	Philippines	Jakarta, Indonesia
19:00 (UTC+7)	Gonzáles 43'	Report		Stadium: Gelora Bung Karno Stadium; Attendance: 88,000; Referee: Ali Abdulnabi (Bahrain)

=== 2011 ===
9 February 2012 AFC Challenge Cup qualification	Philippines	2–0	Mongolia	Bacolod, Philippines
19:00 (UTC+8)	Caligdong 43'; P. Younghusband 90+4'	Report		Stadium: Panaad Stadium; Attendance: 20,000; Referee: Yu Ming-hsun (Chinese Taipei)

15 March 2012 AFC Challenge Cup qualification	Mongolia	2–1	Philippines	Ulan Baatar, Mongolia
13:00 (UTC+8)	Lkhümbengarav 22'; Garidmagnai 35'	Report	J. Younghusband 4'	Stadium: MFF Football Centre; Attendance: 3,000; Referee: Ko Hyung-Jin (Korea Republic)

21 March 2012 AFC Challenge Cup qualification	Myanmar	1–1	Philippines	Yangon, Myanmar
15:30 (UTC+6:30)	Khin Maung Lwin 90+3'	Report	J. Younghusband 76' (pen.)	Stadium: Thuwunna Stadium; Attendance: 5,000; Referee: Kim Jong-Hyeok (Korea Republic)

23 March 2012 AFC Challenge Cup qualification	Philippines	0–0	Palestine	Yangon, Myanmar
15:30 (UTC+6:30)		Report		Stadium: Thuwunna Stadium; Attendance: 500; Referee: Ali Sabah Adday Al-Qaysi (Iraq)

25 March 2012 AFC Challenge Cup qualification	Bangladesh	0–3	Philippines	Yangon, Myanmar
15:30 (UTC+6:30)		Report	Araneta 41'; Guirado 55', 80'	Stadium: Aung San Stadium; Attendance: 500; Referee: Kim Jong-Hyeok (Korea Republic)

29 June 2014 FIFA World Cup qualification	Sri Lanka	1–1	Philippines	Colombo, Sri Lanka
16:00 (UTC+05:30)	Wellala 43'	Report	Burkey 50'	Stadium: Sugathadasa Stadium; Attendance: 4,000; Referee: Tayeb Shamsuzzaman (Bangladesh)

3 July 2014 FIFA World Cup qualification	Philippines	4–0	Sri Lanka	Manila, Philippines
15:30 (UTC+8)	Caligdong 20'; P. Younghusband 43', 57' (pen.); Guirado 50'	Report		Stadium: Rizal Memorial Stadium; Referee: Kim Sang Woo (Korea Republic)

23 July 2014 FIFA World Cup qualification	Kuwait	3–0	Philippines	Hawally, Kuwait
19:30 (UTC+3)	Naser 17'; Al-Enzi 68'; Al Ebrahim 85'	Report		Stadium: Mohammed Al-Hamad Stadium; Attendance: 20,000; Referee: Mohammad Abu Loum (Jordan)

28 July 2014 FIFA World Cup qualification	Philippines	1–2	Kuwait	Manila, Philippines
19:00 (UTC+8)	Schröck 45+2'	Report	Naser 63'; Jumah 85'	Stadium: Rizal Memorial Stadium; Attendance: 13,000; Referee: Liu Kwok Man (Hong Kong)

30 September 2011 Long Teng Cup	Hong Kong	3–3	Philippines	Kaohsiung, Taiwan
16:30 (UTC+8)	Lee Wai Lim 2'; Cheng Lai Hin 22'; Au Yeung Yiu Chung 86'	Report	P. Younghusband 31' (pen.); Caligdong 44', 61'	Stadium: Kaohsiung National Stadium

2 October 2011 Long Teng Cup	Chinese Taipei	0–0	Philippines	Kaohsiung, Taiwan
19:00 (UTC+8)		Report		Stadium: Kaohsiung National Stadium

4 October 2011 Long Teng Cup	Philippines	2–0	Macau	Kaohsiung, Taiwan
16:30 (UTC+8)	Caligdong 58', 87'	Report		Stadium: Kaohsiung National Stadium

7 October Friendly	Singapore	2–0	Philippines	Kallang, Singapore
	Esah 51'; Đurić 65'	Report		Stadium: Jalan Besar Stadium

11 October Friendly	Philippines	4–0	Nepal	Manila, Philippines
	P. Younghusband 17', 54'; J. Younghusband 28'; Hartmann 88'	Report		Stadium: Rizal Memorial Stadium

3 December Unofficial friendly	Philippines	1–6	(United States) LA Galaxy	Manila, Philippines
	P. Younghusband 42'	Report	Beckham 20'; Magee 39'; Keane 47'; Cristman 63', 87'; Berhalter 81'	Stadium: Rizal Memorial Stadium

=== 2012 ===
29 February Friendly	Philippines	1–1	Malaysia	Manila, Philippines
	Wolf 34'	Report	Ali 90+1'	Stadium: Rizal Memorial Stadium; Attendance: 7,000

9 March 2012 AFC Challenge Cup GS	North Korea	2–0	Philippines	Kathmandu, Nepal
15:00 (UTC+5:45)	Pak Nam-Chol I 58'; Jang Kuk-Chol 70'	Report		Stadium: Halchowk Stadium; Attendance: 1,500; Referee: Pratap Singh (India)

11 March 2012 AFC Challenge Cup GS	Philippines	2–0	India	Kathmandu, Nepal
17:00 (UTC+5:45)	P. Younghusband 10', 73'	Report		Stadium: Dasarath Rangasala Stadium; Attendance: 300; Referee: Chaiya Mahapab (Thailand)

13 March 2012 AFC Challenge Cup GS	Tajikistan	1–2	Philippines	Kathmandu, Nepal
15:00 (UTC+5:45)	Negmatov 45+1'	Report	P. Younghusband 54'; Á. Guirado 80'	Stadium: Halchowk Stadium; Attendance: 800; Referee: Ryuji Sato (Japan)

16 March 2012 AFC Challenge Cup SF	Turkmenistan	2–1	Philippines	Kathmandu, Nepal
14:30 (UTC+5:45)	Amanow 80'; Çoňkaýew 86'	Report	P. Younghusband 25'	Stadium: Dasarath Rangasala Stadium; Attendance: 500; Referee: Ko Hyung-Jin (Korea Republic)

19 March 2012 AFC Challenge Cup 3rd place	Philippines	4–3	Palestine	Kathmandu, Nepal
14:30 (UTC+5:45)	P. Younghusband 4', 25' (pen.); Á. Guirado 42'; J. Guirado 69'	Report	Abuhabib 21', 67'; Attal 78'	Stadium: Dasarath Rangasala Stadium; Attendance: 1,000; Referee: Ali Sabbagh (Lebanon)

1 June Friendly	Malaysia	0–0	Philippines	Shah Alam, Malaysia
		Report		Stadium: Shah Alam Stadium

5 June Friendly	Philippines	2–2	Indonesia	Manila, Philippines
	J. Younghusband 59'; P. Younghusband 83'	Report	Wanggai 57'; Bachdim 62'	Stadium: Rizal Memorial Stadium; Referee: Kuo Jung Fan (Chinese Taipei)

12 June Friendly	Philippines	3–0	Guam	Bacolod, Philippines
	Guirado 8', 45'; De Murga 13'	Report		Stadium: Panaad Stadium

7 September Friendly	Singapore	0–2	Philippines	Jurong West, Singapore
		Report	Caligdong 8'; P. Younghusband 48'	Stadium: Jurong West Stadium; Attendance: 2,956

25 September 2012 Philippine Peace Cup	Philippines	1–0	Guam	Manila, Philippines
19:30 (UTC+8)	Reichelt 81'	Report		Stadium: Rizal Memorial Stadium; Referee: Phung Dinh Dung (Vietnam)

27 September 2012 Philippine Peace Cup	Philippines	5–0	Macau	Manila, Philippines
19:30 (UTC+8)	Wolf 22', 45', 64'; De Murga 49'; Reichelt 69'	Report		Stadium: Rizal Memorial Stadium; Referee: Vo Quang Vinh (Vietnam)

29 September 2012 Philippine Peace Cup	Philippines	3–1	Chinese Taipei	Manila, Philippines
19:30 (UTC+8)	Wolf 10'; Caligdong 34'; Porteria 43'	Report	Chang Han 51'	Stadium: Rizal Memorial Stadium; Referee: Phung Dinh Dung (Vietnam)

12 October Friendly	Bahrain	0–0	Philippines	Manama, Bahrain
		Report		Stadium: Al Muharraq Stadium

16 October Friendly	Kuwait	2–1	Philippines	Kuwait City, Kuwait
	Al-Mutawa 35'; Al-Enezi 69' (pen.)	Report	P. Younghusband 59' (pen.)

15 November Friendly	Philippines	1–0	Singapore	Cebu, Philippines
	Angeles 54'	Report		Stadium: Cebu City Sports Center

24 November 2012 AFF Championship GS	Thailand	2–1	Philippines	Bangkok, Thailand
20:20 (UTC+7)	Jakkraphan 39'; Anucha 41'	Report	Mulders 77'	Stadium: Rajamangala Stadium; Referee: Ryuji Sato (Japan)

27 November 2012 AFF Championship GS	Vietnam	0–1	Philippines	Bangkok, Thailand
17:30 (UTC+7)		Report	Caligdong 86'	Stadium: Rajamangala Stadium; Referee: Ma Ning (China PR)

30 November 2012 AFF Championship GS	Philippines	2–0	Myanmar	Bangkok, Thailand
20:20 (UTC+7)	P. Younghusband 47'; Á. Guirado 90+4'	Report		Stadium: Supachalasai Stadium; Referee: Yaqoob Abdul Baki (Oman)

8 December 2012 AFF Championship SF 1st leg	Philippines	0–0	Singapore	Manila, Philippines
20:00 (UTC+8)		Report		Stadium: Rizal Memorial Stadium; Referee: Abdullah Al Hilali (Oman)

12 December 2012 AFF Championship SF 2nd leg	Singapore	1–0	Philippines	Kallang, Singapore
20:00 (UTC+8)	Amri 19'	Report		Stadium: Jalan Besar Stadium; Referee: Tan Hai (China PR)

=== 2013 ===
6 February Friendly	Myanmar	0–1	Philippines	Yangon, Myanmar
17:00 (UTC+6:30)		Report	Porteria 77'	Stadium: Thuwunna Stadium

22 March 2014 AFC Challenge Cup qualification	Philippines	Cancelled (Note: Brunei withdrew due to "unavoidable circumstances".)	Brunei	Manila, Philippines
19:30 (UTC+8)				Stadium: Rizal Memorial Stadium

24 March 2014 AFC Challenge Cup qualification	Cambodia	0–8	Philippines	Manila, Philippines
19:30 (UTC+8)		Report	P. Younghusband 26', 31', 34', 88'; Patiño 45', 58'; Schröck 46'; De Murga 90'	Stadium: Rizal Memorial Stadium; Attendance: 6,500; Referee: Nivon Robesh (Sri Lanka)

26 March 2014 AFC Challenge Cup qualification	Philippines	1–0	Turkmenistan	Manila, Philippines
19:30 (UTC+8)	P. Younghusband 67'	Report		Stadium: Rizal Memorial Stadium; Attendance: 8,000; Referee: Wang Di (China PR)

4 June Friendly	Hong Kong	0–1	Philippines	Hong Kong
			J. Younghusband 33'	Stadium: Mong Kok Stadium; Attendance: 4,578

14 August Friendly	Indonesia	2–0	Philippines	Surakarta, Indonesia
	Nwokolo 31'; Roby 67'	Report		Stadium: Manahan Stadium

11 October 2013 Philippine Peace Cup	Philippines	1–2	Chinese Taipei	Bacolod, Philippines
19:00 (UTC+8)	J. Younghusband 45+3'	Report	Li Mao 14'; Lin Chang-lun 65'	Stadium: Panaad Stadium; Referee: Suhaizi Shukri (Malaysia)

15 October 2013 Philippine Peace Cup	Philippines	3–1	Pakistan	Bacolod, Philippines
19:00 (UTC+8)	Reichelt 33'; Greatwich 78'; Schröck 88'	Report	Kalim Ullah 15'	Stadium: Panaad Stadium; Referee: Heru Santoso (Indonesia)

9 November Friendly	United Arab Emirates	4–0	Philippines	Abu Dhabi, United Arab Emirates
	Saleh 19'; Abas 40'; Matar 60'; Mabkhout 79'	Report		Stadium: Zayed Sports City Stadium

15 November Friendly	India	1–1	Philippines	Siliguri, India
	Chhetri 41'	Report	P. Younghusband 42'	Stadium: Kanchenjunga Stadium

=== 2014 ===
1 March Friendly	Malaysia	0–0	Philippines	Selayang, Malaysia
20:45 (UTC+8)		Report		Stadium: Selayang Stadium; Referee: Mohd Amirul Izwan Yaacob (Malaysia)

5 March Friendly	Philippines	0–1	Azerbaijan	Dubai, United Arab Emirates
19:00 (UTC+4)		Report	Yunuszade 26'	Stadium: Al Shabab Stadium; Referee: Fahad Al-Kassar (United Arab Emirates)

11 April Friendly	Philippines	3–0	Nepal	Doha, Qatar
20:30 (UTC+8)	Dizon 14'; Steuble 32'; Doctora 90'	Report		Stadium: Grand Hamad Stadium; Referee: Jasem Ahmad (Kuwait)

27 April Friendly	Philippines	0–0	Malaysia	Cebu, Philippines
20:45 (UTC+8)		Report		Stadium: Cebu City Sports Center; Referee: Thorik Alkatiri (Indonesia)

20 May 2014 AFC Challenge Cup GS	Philippines	0–0	Afghanistan	Addu City, Maldives
22:00 (UTC+5) (Note: Kickoff delayed from 21:00 due to rain.)		Report		Stadium: Addu Football Stadium; Attendance: 500; Referee: Valentin Kovalenko (Uzbekistan)

22 May 2014 AFC Challenge Cup GS	Laos	0–2	Philippines	Addu City, Maldives
16:00 (UTC+5)		Report	Rota 41'; Reichelt 63'	Stadium: Addu Football Stadium; Attendance: 300; Referee: Dmitriy Mashentsev (Kyrgyzstan)

24 May 2014 AFC Challenge Cup GS	Turkmenistan	0–2	Philippines	Malé, Maldives
16:00 (UTC+5)		Report	P. Younghusband 49'; Reichelt 73'	Stadium: National Football Stadium; Attendance: 500; Referee: Nagor Amir Mohamed (Malaysia)

27 May 2014 AFC Challenge Cup SF	Maldives	2–3 (a.e.t.)	Philippines	Malé, Maldives
21:00 (UTC+5)	Umair 36'; Abdulla 66'	Report	P. Younghusband 19'; Lucena 38'; Greatwich 104'	Stadium: National Football Stadium; Attendance: 8,300; Referee: Abdullah Balideh (Qatar)

30 May 2014 AFC Challenge Cup F	Palestine	1–0	Philippines	Malé, Maldives
21:00 (UTC+5)	Nu'man 59'	Report		Stadium: National Football Stadium; Attendance: 6,300; Referee: Valentin Kovalenko (Uzbekistan)

3 September 2014 Philippine Peace Cup SF	Philippines	5–1	Chinese Taipei	Manila, Philippines
19:00 (UTC+8)	Gier 25'; J. Younghusband 37'; Chen Yi-wei 65' (o.g.); Hartmann 74', 88'	Report	Yen Ho-shen 80'	Stadium: Rizal Memorial Stadium; Referee: Chanketya Thong (Cambodia)

6 September 2014 Philippine Peace Cup F	Philippines	2–3 (a.e.t.)	Myanmar	Manila, Philippines
19:00 (UTC+8)	Sato 50'; P. Younghusband 71' (pen.)	Report	Kyaw Ko Ko 8'; Min Min Thu 90+2'; Soe Min Oo 103'	Stadium: Rizal Memorial Stadium; Referee: Xaypaseuth Phonsanit (Laos)

12 October Friendly	Philippines	5–0	Papua New Guinea	Manila, Philippines
20:00 (UTC+8)	Hartmann 2', 10', 19', 45+2'; P. Younghusband 41'	Report		Stadium: Rizal Memorial Stadium; Referee: Nagor Amir Mohamed (Malaysia)

31 October Friendly	Philippines	3–0	Nepal	Doha, Qatar
	S. Greatwich 49'; P. Younghusband 90' (pen.); Hartmann 90+1'	Report

9 November Friendly	Thailand	3–0	Philippines	Nakhon Ratchasima, Thailand
	Tossakrai 30'; Deeprom 54'; Thaweekarn 74'	Report		Stadium: 5 December 2007 Stadium

14 November Friendly	Philippines	3–0	Cambodia	Manila, Philippines
	Sato 13'; Ott 40'; P. Younghusband 90+1'	Report		Stadium: Rizal Memorial Stadium

22 November 2014 AFF Championship GS	Philippines	4–1	Laos	Hanoi, Vietnam
16:00 (UTC+7)	Rota 40'; P. Younghusband 45+1'; Reichelt 77', 88'	Report	Sayavutthi 21'	Stadium: Mỹ Đình National Stadium; Referee: Wang Di (China)

25 November 2014 AFF Championship GS	Philippines	4–0	Indonesia	Hanoi, Vietnam
16:00 (UTC+7)	P. Younghusband 16' (pen.); Ott 52'; Steuble 68'; Gier 79'	Report		Stadium: Mỹ Đình National Stadium; Referee: Fahad Al-Marri (Qatar)

28 November 2014 AFF Championship GS	Vietnam	3–1	Philippines	Hanoi, Vietnam
19:00 (UTC+7)	Ngô Hoàng Thịnh 9'; Vũ Minh Tuấn 50'; Phạm Thành Lương 58'	Report	Mulders 60'	Stadium: Mỹ Đình National Stadium; Referee: Minoru Tōjō (Japan)

6 December 2014 AFF Championship SF 1st leg	Philippines	0–0	Thailand	Manila, Philippines
08:00 (UTC+8)		Report		Stadium: Rizal Memorial Stadium; Referee: Abdullah Balideh (Qatar)

10 December 2014 AFF Championship SF 2nd leg	Thailand	3–0	Philippines	Bangkok, Thailand
19:00 (UTC+7)	Chanathip 6'; Kroekrit 57', 86'	Report		Stadium: Rajamangala Stadium; Referee: Kim Sang-woo (South Korea)

=== 2015 ===
30 March Friendly	Bahrain	2–1	Philippines	Riffa, Bahrain
18:30 (UTC+3)	Aaish 29'; Yaser 31'	Report	Ott 61'	Stadium: Bahrain National Stadium; Referee: Yaqoub Yousef Al-Hamad (United Arab Emirates)

11 June 2018 FIFA World Cup qualification	Philippines	2–1	Bahrain	Bocaue, Philippines
20:00 (UTC+8)	Bahadoran 50'; Patiño 60'	Report (FIFA); Report (AFC)	Al-Malood 90+3'	Stadium: Philippine Sports Stadium; Attendance: 6,000; Referee: Jumpei Iida (Japan)

16 June 2018 FIFA World Cup qualification	Yemen	0–2	Philippines	Doha, Qatar
19:00 (UTC+3)		Report (FIFA); Report (AFC)	Bahadoran 52'; Ramsay 74'	Stadium: Suheim Bin Hamad Stadium; Attendance: 5,200; Referee: Dmitriy Mashentsev (Kyrgyzstan)

3 September Friendly	Philippines	2–0	Maldives	Manila, Philippines
20:00 (UTC+8)	Samdhooh 49' (o.g.); Lucena 55'	Report		Stadium: Rizal Memorial Stadium; Referee: Clifford Daypuyat (Philippines)

8 September 2018 FIFA World Cup qualification	Philippines	1–5	Uzbekistan	Bocaue, Philippines
20:00 (UTC+8)	Schröck 68'	Report (FIFA); Report (AFC)	Ahmedov 1'; Rashidov 14', 80'; Sergeev 43', 65'	Stadium: Philippine Sports Stadium; Attendance: 7,500; Referee: Peter Green (Australia)

8 October 2018 FIFA World Cup qualification	North Korea	0–0	Philippines	Pyongyang, North Korea
16:30 (UTC+9)		Report (FIFA); Report (AFC)		Stadium: Kim Il-sung Stadium; Attendance: 41,000; Referee: Ma Ning (China)

13 October 2018 FIFA World Cup qualification	Bahrain	2–0	Philippines	Riffa, Bahrain
18:00 (UTC+3)	Abdullatif 53'; Adnan 61'	Report (FIFA); Report (AFC)		Stadium: Bahrain National Stadium; Attendance: 3,050; Referee: Mohanad Qasim Eesee Sarray (Iraq)

12 November 2018 FIFA World Cup qualification	Philippines	0–1	Yemen	Manila, Philippines
20:00 (UTC+8)		Report (FIFA); Report (AFC)	Al-Sarori 83'	Stadium: Rizal Memorial Stadium; Attendance: 6,478; Referee: Kim Hee-gon (South Korea)

=== 2016 ===
24 March 2018 FIFA World Cup qualification	Uzbekistan	1–0	Philippines	Tashkent, Uzbekistan
18:00 (UTC+5)	Ismailov 59'	Report (FIFA); Report (AFC)		Stadium: Bunyodkor Stadium; Attendance: 34,000; Referee: Ryuji Sato (Japan)

29 March 2018 FIFA World Cup qualification	Philippines	3–2	North Korea	Manila, Philippines
20:00 (UTC+8)	Bahadoran 44'; Ott 84'; Ramsay 90'	Report (FIFA); Report (AFC)	So Kyong-jin 45+2'; Ri Hyok-chol 48'	Stadium: Rizal Memorial Stadium; Attendance: 7,300; Referee: Fahad Al-Mirdasi (Saudi Arabia)

6 September Friendly	Kyrgyzstan	1–2	Philippines	Bishkek, Kyrgyzstan
20:30 (UTC+6)	Lux 60'		Ingreso 43'; Bahadoran 52'	Stadium: Dolen Omurzakov Stadium; Attendance: 8,200

7 October Friendly	Philippines	1–3	Bahrain	Manila, Philippines
	Mi. Ott 50'		Okwunwanne 5', 46'; Al Romaihi 90+1'	Stadium: Rizal Memorial Stadium

10 October Friendly	Philippines	1–3	North Korea	Manila, Philippines
20:00 (UTC+8)	Ramsay 76'		Pak Kwang-ryong 11'; Pak Song-chol 38'; Jong Il-gwan 68'	Stadium: Rizal Memorial Stadium; Referee: Hoang Anh Tuan (Vietnam)

9 November Friendly	Philippines	1–0	Kyrgyzstan	Manila, Philippines
	Bahadoran 65'			Stadium: Rizal Memorial Stadium

19 November 2016 AFF Championship GS	Philippines	0–0	Singapore	Bocaue, Philippines
20:00 (UTC+8)		Report		Stadium: Philippine Sports Stadium; Referee: Masoud Tufaylieh (Syria)

22 November 2016 AFF Championship GS	Indonesia	2–2	Philippines	Bocaue, Philippines
20:00 (UTC+8)	Fachrudin 7'; Boaz 68'	Report	Bahadoran 31'; P. Younghusband 82'	Stadium: Philippine Sports Stadium; Referee: Yu Ming-hsun (Chinese Taipei)

25 November 2016 AFF Championship GS	Philippines	0–1	Thailand	Bocaue, Philippines
20:00 (UTC+8)		Report	Sarawut 81'	Stadium: Philippine Sports Stadium; Referee: Valentin Kovalenko (Uzbekistan)

=== 2017 ===
22 March Friendly	Philippines	0–0	Malaysia	Manila, Philippines
19:30 (UTC+8)		Report		Stadium: Rizal Memorial Stadium; Referee: Steve Supresencia (Philippines)

28 March 2019 AFC Asian Cup qualification	Philippines	4–1	Nepal	Manila, Philippines
20:00 (UTC+8)	P. Younghusband 21' (pen.), 23'; Ramsay 27'; Patiño 72'	Report	Rai 45+1'	Stadium: Rizal Memorial Stadium; Attendance: 1,715; Referee: Yaqoob Abdul Baki (Oman)

7 June Friendly	China	8–1	Philippines	Guangzhou, China
19:35 (UTC+8)	Ren Hang 3'; Xiao Zhi 25'; Yu Hanchao 43'; Wang Yongpo 54'; Yin Hongbo 57'; Zhang Xizhe 68'; Deng Hanwen 71', 90'		Bahadoran 33'	Stadium: Tianhe Stadium; Referee: Zhang Lei (China)

13 June 2019 AFC Asian Cup qualification	Tajikistan	3–4	Philippines	Dushanbe, Tajikistan
21:00 (UTC+5)	Umarbayev 57' (pen.); Vasiev 61'; Dzhalilov 90'	Report	P. Younghusband 28'; Patiño 41', 48'; Sato 79'	Stadium: Pamir Stadium; Attendance: 15,000; Referee: Hanna Hattab (Syria)

5 September 2019 AFC Asian Cup qualification	Philippines	2–2	Yemen	Bacolod, Philippines
19:30 (UTC+5)	P. Younghusband 30'; J. Younghusband 71'	Report	Al-Radaei 27'; Al-Matari 55'	Stadium: Panaad Park and Stadium; Attendance: 2,911; Referee: Kim Dong-jin (South Korea)

10 October 2019 AFC Asian Cup qualification	Yemen	1–1	Philippines	Al Wakrah, Qatar
18:00 (UTC+3)	Ali 63'	Report	Mi. Ott 89'	Stadium: Saoud bin Abdulrahman Stadium; Attendance: 2,169; Referee: Wang Di (China)

14 November 2019 AFC Asian Cup qualification	Nepal	0–0	Philippines	Lalitpur, Nepal
14:00 (UTC+5:45)		Report		Stadium: ANFA Complex; Attendance: 1,023; Referee: Ahmed Al-Ali (Jordan)

1 December 2017 CTFA International Tournament	Laos	1–3	Philippines	Taipei, Taiwan
16:00 (UTC+8)	Kongmathilath 90+5'	Report	P. Younghusband 35'; Guirado 47'; Miyagi 89'	Stadium: Taipei Municipal Stadium; Referee: Yu Ming-Hsun (Chinese Taipei)

3 December 2017 CTFA International Tournament	Chinese Taipei	3–0	Philippines	Taipei, Taiwan
19:00 (UTC+8)	Li Mao 38', 63'; Chen Ting-yang 81'	Report		Stadium: Taipei Municipal Stadium

5 December 2017 CTFA International Tournament	Timor-Leste	1–0	Philippines	Taipei, Taiwan
16:00 (UTC+8)	Garcia 89'	Report		Stadium: Taipei Municipal Stadium; Referee: Kao Jung-Fang (Chinese Taipei)

=== 2018 ===
22 March Friendly	Philippines	3–2	Fiji	Manila, Philippines
19:30 (UTC+8)	P. Younghusband 30' (pen.); Minegishi 53'; Ingreso 63'	Report	Votoniu 74'; Krishna 81' (pen.)	Stadium: Rizal Memorial Stadium; Attendance: 1,526

27 March 2019 AFC Asian Cup qualification	Philippines	2–1	Tajikistan	Manila, Philippines
19:30 (UTC+8)	Ingreso 74'; P. Younghusband 90+1' (pen.)	Report	Nazarov 64' (pen.)	Stadium: Rizal Memorial Stadium; Attendance: 4,671; Referee: Jarred Gillett (Australia)

6 September Friendly	Bahrain	1–1	Philippines	Riffa, Bahrain
19:00 (UTC+3)	Sayed A. 90+7'		P. Younghusband 49' (pen.)	Stadium: Bahrain National Stadium

9 September Friendly	Al-Hadd (Bahrain)	3–2	Philippines	Bahrain
19:00 (UTC+3)	? (?)	Report

3 October 2018 Bangabandhu Cup	Philippines	3–1	Laos	Sylhet, Bangladesh
18:30 (UTC+6)	Bedic 44' (pen.); Gayoso 53'; Bahadoran 82' (pen.)	Report	Kongmathilath 88' (pen.)	Stadium: Sylhet District Stadium; Referee: Çarymyrat Kurbanow (Turkmenistan)

5 October 2018 Bangabandhu Cup	Bangladesh	0–1	Philippines	Sylhet, Bangladesh
18:30 (UTC+6)		Report	Daniels 24'	Stadium: Sylhet District Stadium; Referee: Zaid Thamer Mohammed (Iraq)

9 October 2018 Bangabandhu Cup SF	Philippines	0–2	Tajikistan	Cox's Bazar, Bangladesh
14:30 (UTC+6)		Report	Tursunov 31'; Nazarov 90+7'	Stadium: Cox's Bazar Stadium; Referee: Mahmood Al-Majarafi (Oman)

13 October Friendly	Philippines	1–1	Oman	Al Rayyan, Qatar
18:30 (UTC+3)	Al-Hajri 38' (o.g.)	Report	Saleh 8'	Stadium: Thani bin Jassim Stadium; Referee: Khamis Al Marri (Qatar)

13 November 2018 AFF Championship GS	Philippines	1–0	Singapore	Bacolod, Philippines
20:00 (UTC+8)	Reichelt 78'	Report (AFFSZ); Report (AFF)		Stadium: Panaad Stadium; Attendance: 4,327; Referee: Suhaizi Shukri (Malaysia)

17 November 2018 AFF Championship GS	Timor-Leste	2–3	Philippines	Kuala Lumpur, Malaysia
17:00 (UTC+8)	Reis 73' (pen.); João Pedro 75'	Report (AFFSZ); Report (AFF)	P. Younghusband 27'; Steuble 33' de Murga 68'	Stadium: Kuala Lumpur Stadium; Attendance: 312; Referee: Amdillah Zainuddin (Brunei)

21 November 2018 AFF Championship GS	Philippines	1–1	Thailand	Bacolod, Philippines
19:30 (UTC+8)	Bedic 81'	Report (AFFSZ); Report (AFF)	Supachai 56'	Stadium: Panaad Stadium; Attendance: 3,522; Referee: Nagor Amir Noor Mohamed (Malaysia)

25 November 2018 AFF Championship GS	Indonesia	0–0	Philippines	Jakarta, Indonesia
19:00 (UTC+7)		Report (AFFSZ); Report (AFF)		Stadium: Gelora Bung Karno Stadium; Attendance: 15,436; Referee: Fu Ming (China)

2 December 2018 AFF Championship SF 1st leg	Philippines	1–2	Vietnam	Bacolod, Philippines
19:30 (UTC+8)	Reichelt 45+2'	Report (AFFSZ); Report (AFF)	Nguyễn Anh Đức 12'; Phan Văn Đức 48'	Stadium: Panaad Stadium; Attendance: 5,489; Referee: Abdulrahman Al-Jassim (Qatar)

6 December 2018 AFF Championship SF 2nd leg	Vietnam	2–1	Philippines	Hanoi, Vietnam
19:30 (UTC+7)	Nguyễn Quang Hải 83'; Nguyễn Công Phượng 87'	Report (AFFSZ); Report (AFF)	J. Younghusband 89'	Stadium: Mỹ Đình National Stadium; Attendance: 38,816; Referee: Hiroyuki Kimura (Japan)

=== 2019 ===
7 January 2019 AFC Asian Cup GS	South Korea	1–0	Philippines	Dubai, United Arab Emirates
17:30 (UTC+4)	Hwang Ui-jo 67'	Report		Stadium: Al-Maktoum Stadium; Attendance: 3,185; Referee: Nawaf Shukralla (Bahrain)

11 January 2019 AFC Asian Cup GS	Philippines	0–3	China	Abu Dhabi, United Arab Emirates
17:30 (UTC+4)		Report	Wu Lei 40', 66'; Yu Dabao 80'	Stadium: Mohammed bin Zayed Stadium; Attendance: 16,013; Referee: Hiroyuki Kimura (Japan)

16 January 2019 AFC Asian Cup GS	Kyrgyzstan	3–1	Philippines	Dubai, United Arab Emirates
17:30 (UTC+4)	Lux 24', 51', 77'	Report	Schröck 80'	Stadium: Rashid Stadium; Attendance: 4,217; Referee: Turki Al-Khudhayr (Saudi Arabia)

7 June Friendly	China	2–0	Philippines	Guangzhou, China
19:35 (UTC+8)	Wu Xi 14'; Zhang Xizhe 54'	Report		Stadium: Tianhe Stadium; Attendance: 39,836; Referee: Ravshan Irmatov (Uzbekistan)

5 September 2022 FIFA World Cup qualification	Philippines	2–5	Syria	Bacolod, Philippines
19:30 (UTC+8)	Patiño 7'; Ott 83'	Report (FIFA); Report (AFC)	Al Soma 15', 56'; Mobayed 31'; Al-Khatib 49' (pen.); Al-Mawas 85'	Stadium: Panaad Stadium; Attendance: 2,645; Referee: Jumpei Iida (Japan)

10 September 2022 FIFA World Cup qualification	Guam	1–4	Philippines	Dededo, Guam
15:30 (UTC+10)	Lopez 67' (pen.)	Report (FIFA); Report (AFC)	Guirado 7'; Reichelt 12'; Schröck 71'; Strauß 82'	Stadium: Guam F.A. National Training Center; Attendance: 1,096; Referee: Kim Woo-sung (South Korea)

15 October 2022 FIFA World Cup qualification	Philippines	0–0	China	Bacolod, Philippines
20:00 (UTC+8)		Report (FIFA); Report (AFC)		Stadium: Panaad Stadium; Attendance: 2,982; Referee: Aziz Asimov (Uzbekistan)

14 November 2022 FIFA World Cup qualification	Maldives	1–2	Philippines	Malé, Maldives
16:00 (UTC+5)	Hassan 90+3'	Report (FIFA); Report (AFC)	Ramsay 52'; Strauß 68'	Stadium: National Football Stadium; Attendance: 2,700; Referee: Ahmed Al-Ali (Jordan)

19 November 2022 FIFA World Cup qualification	Syria	1–0	Philippines	Dubai, United Arab Emirates
16:00 (UTC+4)	Al Salama 23'	Report (FIFA); Report (AFC)		Stadium: Rashid Stadium; Attendance: 2,445; Referee: Rowan Arumughan (India)

== Head-to-head records ==
Philippines national football team head-to-head records (2010–2019)
Opponent	Pld	W	D	L	GF	GA	GD	Pts	Confederation
Afghanistan	1	0	1	0	0	0	0	1	AFC
Azerbaijan	1	0	0	1	0	1	–1	0	UEFA
Bahrain	6	1	2	3	5	9	–4	5	AFC
Bangladesh	2	2	0	0	4	0	+4	6	AFC
Cambodia	3	2	1	0	11	0	+11	7	AFC
China	4	0	1	3	1	13	–12	1	AFC
Chinese Taipei	7	2	3	2	10	8	+2	9	AFC
Fiji	1	1	0	0	3	2	+1	3	OFC
Guam	3	3	0	0	8	1	+7	9	AFC
Hong Kong	2	1	1	0	4	3	+1	4	AFC
India	2	1	1	0	3	1	+2	4	AFC
Indonesia	7	1	3	3	8	8	0	6	AFC
Kuwait	3	0	0	3	2	7	–5	0	AFC
Kyrgyzstan	3	2	0	1	4	4	0	6	AFC
Laos	5	4	1	0	14	5	+9	13	AFC
Macau	3	3	0	0	12	0	+12	9	AFC
Malaysia	5	0	5	0	1	1	0	5	AFC
Maldives	3	3	0	0	7	3	+4	9	AFC
Mongolia	2	1	0	1	3	2	+1	3	AFC
Myanmar	5	2	2	1	6	4	+2	8	AFC
Nepal	5	4	1	0	14	1	+13	13	AFC
North Korea	4	1	1	2	4	7	–3	4	AFC
Oman	1	0	1	0	1	1	0	1	AFC
Pakistan	1	1	0	0	3	1	+2	3	AFC
Palestine	3	1	1	1	4	4	0	4	AFC
Papua New Guinea	1	1	0	0	5	0	+5	3	OFC
Singapore	8	3	3	2	5	4	+1	12	AFC
South Korea	1	0	0	1	0	1	–1	0	AFC
Sri Lanka	2	1	1	0	5	1	+4	4	AFC
Syria	2	0	0	2	2	6	–4	0	AFC
Tajikistan	4	3	0	1	8	7	+1	9	AFC
Thailand	6	0	2	4	2	10	–8	2	AFC
Timor-Leste	3	2	0	1	8	3	+5	6	AFC
Turkmenistan	3	2	0	1	4	2	+2	6	AFC
United Arab Emirates	1	0	0	1	0	4	–4	0	AFC
Uzbekistan	2	0	0	2	1	6	–5	0	AFC
Vietnam	5	2	0	3	6	7	–1	6	AFC
Yemen	4	1	2	1	5	4	+1	5	AFC
Total	114	41	32	41	183	140	+43	155	
