= Football at the 2015 Summer Universiade – Men's tournament =

Men's football at the XXVIII Summer Universiade
- Venue: Various
- Dates: July 2–13, 2015

The men's tournament of football at the 2015 Summer Universiade was held from July 2 to 13 in Gwangju, South Korea.

== Teams ==
Africa	Americas	Asia	Europe
South Africa	Brazil; Canada; Mexico; Uruguay	South Korea (host); China; Iran; Japan; Malaysia; Chinese Taipei	France; Ireland; Italy; Russia; Ukraine

== Preliminary round ==
=== Group A ===
Team	Pld	W	D	L	GF	GA	GD	Pts
South Korea	3	3	0	0	7	2	+5	9
Italy	3	1	1	1	5	3	+2	4
Chinese Taipei	3	1	1	1	2	3	−1	4
Canada	3	0	0	3	3	9	−6	0

2 July 2015
11:00

South Korea	3–1	Chinese Taipei
Jung Won-jin 11'; Park Dong-jin 13', 52'	Report	Chen Chao-an 65'

Yeonggwang Sportium Football Field
Referee: Fernando Falce (Uruguay)
2 July 2015
11:00

Canada	2–5	Italy
Visintin 71', 83'	Report	Meccariello 11', 30'; Morosini 14'; Biasci 26'; Dezi 78'

Mokpo International Football Center Secondly Stadium
Referee: Kim Hee-gon (South Korea)

5 July 2015
16:30

South Korea	1–0	Italy
Jung Woo-jin 60'	Report

Jeongeup Public Stadium
Referee: Santander Aguirre (Mexico)
5 July 2015
16:30

Canada	0–1	Chinese Taipei
	Report	Ko Yu-ting 48'

Gochang Public Stadium
Referee: Kulasande Qongqo (South Africa)

7 July 2015
16:30

South Korea	3–1	Canada
Seo Young-jae 18'; Lee Jeong-bin 83', 87'	Report	Greedy 58'

Yeonggwang Sportium Football Field
Referee: Yaroslav Kozyk (Ukraine)
7 July 2015
16:30

Italy	0–0	Chinese Taipei
	Report

Mokpo International Football Center Secondly Stadium
Referee: Bijan Heidari (Iran)

=== Group B ===
Team	Pld	W	D	L	GF	GA	GD	Pts
South Africa	3	2	0	1	7	4	+3	6
France	3	1	2	0	5	3	+2	5
Ukraine	3	1	1	1	3	4	−1	4
Mexico	3	0	1	2	1	5	−4	1

2 July 2015
16:30

France	3–1	South Africa
Sanson 18'; Oliveri 46'; Matumona 72'	Report	Stowman 6'

Yeonggwang Sportium Football Field
Referee: Yaroslav Kozyk (Ukraine)
2 July 2015
16:30

Ukraine	1–0	Mexico
Kotlyar 85'	Report

Mokpo International Football Center Secondly Stadium
Referee: Takuto Okabe (Japan)

5 July 2015
11:00

France	1–1	Mexico
Mazure 10'	Report	Hernandez 58'

Jeongeup Public Stadium
Referee: Suhaizi Shukri (Malaysia)
5 July 2015
11:00

Ukraine	1–3	South Africa
Kotlyar 13'	Report	Stowman 42'; Jeremiah 77', 90'

Gochang Public Stadium
Referee: Nivon Robesh Gamini (Sri Lanka)

7 July 2015
11:00

France	1–1	Ukraine
Oliveri 63'	Report	Butenin 23'

Yeonggwang Sportium Football Field
Referee: Drew Fischer (Canada)
7 July 2015
11:00

Mexico	0–3	South Africa
	Report	Kaibe 72', 81', 90+2'

Mokpo International Football Center Secondly Stadium
Referee: Tan Hai (China)

=== Group C ===
Team	Pld	W	D	L	GF	GA	GD	Pts
Japan	3	3	0	0	7	1	+6	9
Brazil	3	2	0	1	7	4	+3	6
Malaysia	3	1	0	2	2	6	−4	3
Iran	3	0	0	3	3	8	−5	0

2 July 2015
16:30

Japan	2–1	Iran
Izumi 68'; Sawakami 81'	Report	Fatemi 46'

Jeongeup Public Stadium
Referee: Davide Massa (Italy)
2 July 2015
16:30

Malaysia	1–2	Brazil
Syahrul 77' (pen.)	Report	Lustosa Nascimento 22' da Silva 35' (pen.)

Gochang Public Stadium
Referee: Drew Fischer (Canada)

5 July 2015
11:00

Japan	1–0	Brazil
Hayama 66'	Report

Yeonggwang Sportium Football Field
Referee: Marco Borg (Malta)
5 July 2015
11:00

Malaysia	1–0	Iran
Awang Kechik 13'	Report

Mokpo International Football Center Secondly Stadium
Referee: Fernando Falce (Uruguay)

7 July 2015
11:00

Japan	4–0	Malaysia
Sawakami 25', 45'; Kimoto 65'; Hasegawa 90+2'	Report

Jeongeup Public Stadium
Referee: Aleksei Eskov (Russia)
7 July 2015
11:00

Brazil	5–2	Iran
Araujo Pinheiro 50', 62', 71'; Ribeiro Orestes 64'; Valverde Leao 82'	Report	Fatemi 30'; Osanikord 69'

Gochang Public Stadium
Referee: Santander Aguirre (Mexico)

=== Group D ===
Team	Pld	W	D	L	GF	GA	GD	Pts
Republic of Ireland	3	2	1	0	3	1	+2	7
Uruguay	3	1	2	0	2	1	+1	5
Russia	3	1	1	1	4	4	0	4
China	3	0	0	3	3	6	−3	0

2 July 2015
11:00

Russia	3–2	China
Yanushkovsky 18'; Karasev 50'; Saramutin 61'	Report	Han Guanghui 28', 47'

Jeongeup Public Stadium
Referee: Santander Aguirre (Mexico)
2 July 2015
11:00

Republic of Ireland	0–0	Uruguay
	Report

Gochang Public Stadium
Referee: Bijan Heidari (Iran)

5 July 2015
16:30

Russia	0–0	Uruguay
	Report

Yeonggwang Sportium Football Field
Referee: Kim Hee-gon (South Korea)
5 July 2015
16:30

Republic of Ireland	1–0	China
Molloy 43'	Report

Mokpo International Football Center Secondly Stadium
Referee: Drew Fischer (Canada)

7 July 2015
16:30

Russia	1–2	Republic of Ireland
Karasev 80' (pen.)	Report	Corrigan 45+2'; O'Sullivan 59'

Jeongeup Public Stadium
Referee: Takuto Okabe (Japan)
7 July 2015
16:30

Uruguay	2–1	China
Davila 34'; Monroy 75'	Report	Guo Ziyin 82'

Gochang Public Stadium
Referee: Davide Massa (Italy)

== Classification round ==
Fifth place
C4	Iran	1(1)
A4	Canada	1(4)
Seventh place
A3	Chinese Taipei	2
C3	Malaysia	3

Consolation semifinals
A3	Chinese Taipei	1(3)
C4	Iran	1(4)
C3	Malaysia	1(2)
A4	Canada	1(4)

Quarterfinals
A3	Chinese Taipei	1
D4	China	2
B3	Ukraine	2(5)
C4	Iran	2(4)
C3	Malaysia	1
B4	Mexico	3
D3	Russia	2
A4	Canada	0

Semifinals
D4	China	3
B3	Ukraine	1
B4	Mexico	0
D3	Russia	1

Final
D4	China	0
D3	Russia	3
Third place
B3	Ukraine	1
B4	Mexico	4

=== Quarterfinal round ===
==== 9th–16th place ====
9 July 2015
11:00

Chinese Taipei	1–2	China
Li Mao 4'	Report	Yu Zengpin 13'; Han Guanghui 20'

Yeonggwang Sportium Football Field
Referee: Marco Borg (Malta)
9 July 2015
11:00

Russia	2–0	Canada
Karasev 90' (pen.), 90+3'	Report

Mokpo International Football Center Secondly Stadium
Referee: Nivon Robesh Gamini (Sri Lanka)
9 July 2015
11:00

Ukraine	2–2	Iran
Medynskyi 76'; Panasenko 85'	Report	Osanikord 34', 66'
Penalties
Kotlyar (penalty scored); Yefremov (penalty scored); Zapadnya (penalty scored); Zubok (penalty missed); Borovets (penalty missed); Kurylo (penalty scored); Panasenko (penalty scored)	5–4	Aghazamani (penalty scored); Davoodi (penalty scored); Zahiri (penalty scored); Mirabi (penalty missed); Ahmadi (penalty missed); Karamibaseri (penalty scored); Asgari (penalty missed)

Jeongeup Public Stadium
Referee: Kim Hee-gon (South Korea)
9 July 2015
11:00

Malaysia	1–3	Mexico
Thamil 19'	Report	Villanueva 24'; Hernandez 30'; Belloso 84' (pen.)

Gochang Public Stadium
Referee: Kulasande Qongqo (South Africa)

=== Semifinal round ===
==== 13th–16th place ====
11 July 2015
11:00

Canada	1–1	Malaysia
Greedy 59'	Report	Haddad 37' (o.g.)
Penalties
Murphy (penalty scored); Cook (penalty scored); Haddad (penalty scored); Greedy (penalty scored)	4–2	Syahrul (penalty scored); Nursalam (penalty missed); Naim (penalty missed); D. Kenny (penalty scored)

Gochang Public Stadium
Referee: Takuto Okabe (Japan)
11 July 2015
16:30

Chinese Taipei	1–1	Iran
Li Mao 75'	Report	Osanikord 39'
Penalties
Lin Chang-lun (penalty scored); Li Mao (penalty missed); Wei Yu-jen (penalty scored); Wang Ruei (penalty missed); Yen Ho-shen (penalty scored)	3–4	Aghazamani (penalty scored); Zahiri (penalty missed); Hosseinpouraghamolki (penalty scored); Karamibaseri (penalty scored); Osanikord (penalty scored)

Gochang Public Stadium
Referee: Yaroslav Kozyk (Ukraine)

==== 9th–12th place ====
11 July 2015
11:00

China	3–1	Ukraine
Yu Zengpin 47', 59'; Hu Ming 75'	Report	Kurylo 26' (pen.)

Jeongeup Public Stadium
Referee: Drew Fischer (Canada)
11 July 2015
16:30

Mexico	0–1	Russia
	Report	Smirnov 29'

Jeongeup Public Stadium
Referee: Yu Ming-hsun (Chinese Taipei)

== Elimination round ==
Fifth place
B1	South Africa	1
D1	Republic of Ireland	3
Seventh place
D2	Uruguay	2
B2	France	1

Consolation semifinals
D2	Uruguay	1
B1	South Africa	2
B2	France	1(6)
D1	Republic of Ireland	1(7)

Quarterfinals
A1	South Korea	3
D2	Uruguay	0
B1	South Africa	1
C2	Brazil	2
C1	Japan	1
B2	France	0
D1	Republic of Ireland	0
A2	Italy	1

Semifinals
A1	South Korea	2
C2	Brazil	0
C1	Japan	0(1)
A2	Italy	0(3)

Final
A1	South Korea	0
A2	Italy	3
Third place
C2	Brazil	0(6)
C1	Japan	0(7)

=== Quarterfinals ===
9 July 2015
16:30

South Africa	1–2	Brazil
Mogotsi 15'	Report	Ribeiro Orestes 31'; Araujo Pinheiro 64'

Yeonggwang Sportium Football Field
Referee: Yu Ming-hsun (Chinese Taipei)
9 July 2015
16:30

Japan	1–0	France
Tagami 45+1'	Report

Mokpo International Football Center Secondly Stadium
Referee: Bijan Heidari (Iran)
9 July 2015
16:30

South Korea	3–0	Uruguay
Lee Jeong-bin 28'; Jung Won-jin 70' (pen.), 90+2'	Report

Jeongeup Public Stadium
Referee: Aleksei Eskov (Russia)
9 July 2015
16:30

Republic of Ireland	0–1	Italy
	Report	Morosini 41'

Gochang Public Stadium
Referee: Tan Hai (China)

=== Semifinals ===
==== 5th–8th place ====
11 July 2015
11:00

France	1–1	Republic of Ireland
Bacle 72'	Report	O'Sullivan 88'
Penalties
Denis (penalty scored); Weyders (penalty scored); Bacle (penalty scored); Chauvet (penalty scored); Diarra (penalty scored); Vincent (penalty missed); Lasme (penalty scored); Oliveri (penalty missed)	6–7	Bonner (penalty scored); O'Sullivan (penalty scored); Kelly (penalty scored); McGreal (penalty scored); McDonald (penalty scored); Last (penalty missed); Mernagh (penalty scored); Higgins (penalty scored)

Mokpo International Football Center Secondly Stadium
Referee: Santander Aguirre (Mexico)
11 July 2015
16:30

Uruguay	1–2	South Africa
Pua 58'	Report	Jeremiah 86'; Nkosi 90+1'

Mokpo International Football Center Secondly Stadium
Referee: Davide Massa (Italy)

==== 1st–4th place ====
11 July 2015
11:00

Japan	0–0	Italy
	Report
Penalties
Yuzawa (penalty missed); Tagami (penalty missed); Okuyama (penalty scored); Arai (penalty missed)	1–3	Meccariello (penalty scored); Berra (penalty scored); Cappelletti (penalty scored)

Yeonggwang Sportium Football Field
Referee: Fernando Falce (Uruguay)
11 July 2015
16:30

South Korea	2–0	Brazil
Lee Hyun-sung 56'; Jung Won-jin 64'	Report

Yeonggwang Sportium Football Field
Referee: Marco Borg (Malta)

== Final round ==
All of the following matches will be held on July 13, 2015. Only the gold-medal match will need 30 minutes extra time if two teams draw. Other matches will go directly to penalty shoot-outs if the two teams tie.

=== 15th-place game ===
13 July 2015
11:00

Chinese Taipei	2–3	Malaysia
Wang Ruei 35'; Yen Ho-shen 90+1' (pen.)	Report	Syahrul 56'; Raslam 67'; Faizat 75'

Jeongeup Public Stadium
Referee: Bijan Heidari (Iran)

=== 13th-place game ===
13 July 2015
11:00

Canada	1–1	Iran
Elkinson 90+2'	Report	Shajie 6'
Penalties
Murphy (penalty scored); Cook (penalty scored); Elkinson (penalty scored); Greedy (penalty scored)	4–1	Hossseinpouraghamolki (penalty missed); Zahiri (penalty missed); Karamibaseri (penalty scored)

Yeonggwang Sportium Football Field
Referee: Tan Hai (China)

=== 11th-place game ===
13 July 2015
11:00

Mexico	4–1	Ukraine
Hernandez 5'; Del Cueto 33', 90' (pen.); Cervantez 45+1'	Report	Kotlyar 83' (pen.)

Mokpo International Football Center Secondly Stadium
Referee: Kulasande Qongqo (South Africa)

=== 9th-place game ===
13 July 2015
16:30

Russia	3–0	China
Yanushkovsky 18'; Kotlov 32'; Koshelev 43'	Report

Mokpo International Football Center Secondly Stadium
Referee: Kim Hee-gon (South Korea)

=== 7th-place game ===
13 July 2015
16:30

Uruguay	2–1	France
Monroy 15'; Ottado 30'	Report	Oliveri 67'

Jeongeup Public Stadium
Referee: Yu Ming-hsun (Chinese Taipei)

=== 5th-place game ===
13 July 2015
16:30

Republic of Ireland	3–1	South Africa
McGreal 16'; McGuinness 64'; Bonner 84' (pen.)	Report	Jeremiah 15'

Yeonggwang Sportium Football Field
Referee: Drew Fischer (Canada)

=== Bronze-medal match ===
13 July 2015
16:00

Brazil	0–0	Japan
	Report
Penalties
Kuhn (penalty scored); Ribeiro (penalty scored); Santos (penalty scored); Marques (penalty scored); Aniceto (penalty scored); Lucas (penalty scored); Dos Santos (penalty missed)	6–7	Goya (penalty scored); Hasegawa (penalty scored); Muroya (penalty scored); Matsushita (penalty scored); Kimoto (penalty scored); Tagami (penalty scored); Fukushima (penalty scored)

Naju Public Stadium
Referee: Santander Aguirre (Mexico)

=== Gold-medal match ===
13 July 2015
19:00

South Korea	0–3	Italy
	Report	Biasci 11'; Regoli 32'; Morosini 54'

Naju Public Stadium
Referee: Aleksei Eskov (Russia)

== Final standings ==
Place	Team	Score
1st place, gold medalist(s)	Italy	
2nd place, silver medalist(s)	South Korea	
3rd place, bronze medalist(s)	Japan	
4	Brazil	
5	Ireland	
6	South Africa	
7	Uruguay	
8	France	
9	Russia	
10	China	
11	Mexico	
12	Ukraine	
13	Canada	
14	Iran	
15	Malaysia	
16	Chinese Taipei	
