= Wu Pai-ho =

Taiwanese footballer

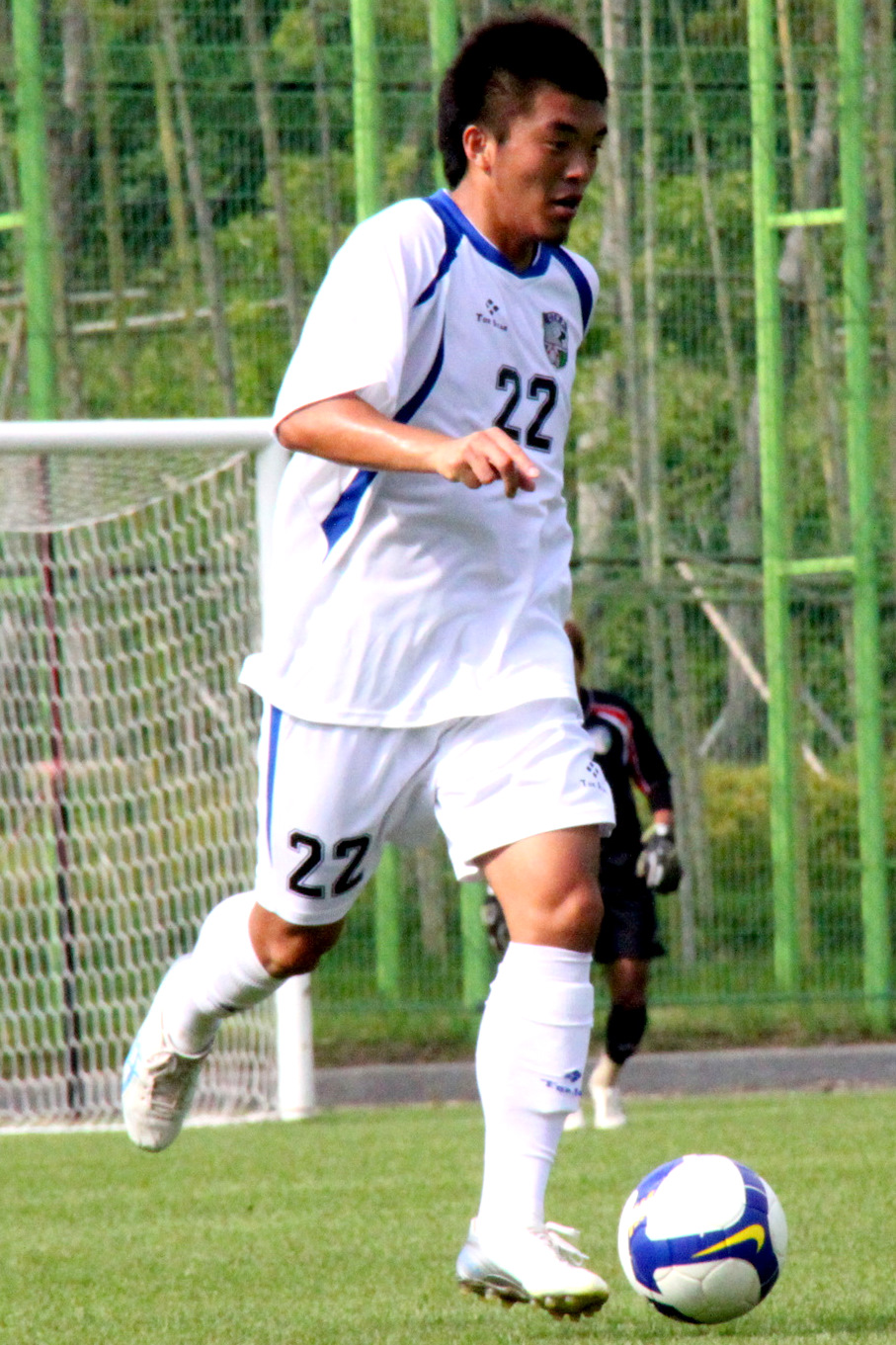

Personal information
- Full name: Wu Pai-ho (吳百和)
- Date of birth: November 29, 1987 (age 38)
- Place of birth: Taiwan
- Position: Midfielder

Youth career
- 2003–2004: Ching Shui SHS
- 2004–2006: Pei Men SHS
- 2006: Fu Jen Uni.

Senior career*
Years	Team	Apps	(Gls)
2005	NSTC		

International career
2006–present	Chinese Taipei	1	(1)
2007	Chinese Taipei U-23	0	(0)
- * Club domestic league appearances and goals as of April 15, 2007

Wu Pai-ho (simplified Chinese: 吴百和; traditional Chinese: 吳百和, born November 29, 1987) is a Taiwanese football player. He received the "Golden Shoe" award in the Highschool Football League 2006 season.

== Playing history ==
- Taipei County Ching Shui Senior High School
- National Pei Men Senior High School
- Fu Jen Catholic University

== Career Honours ==
Individual Honours

- Highschool Football League 2006 Golden Shoe

== International goals ==
Scores and results are list Taiwan's goal tally first.
No.	Date	Venue	Opponent	Score	Result	Competition
1.	18 October 2006	Chungshan Soccer Stadium, Taipei, Taiwan	São Tomé and Príncipe	1–2	2–2	Friendly
2.	6 September 2014	Rizal Memorial Stadium, Manila, Philippines	Palestine	1–2	3–7	2014 Philippine Peace Cup
