= Ihor Kurylo =

Ukrainian footballer

Personal information
- Full name: Ihor Mykhaylovych Kurylo
- Date of birth: 3 May 1993 (age 33)
- Place of birth: Zboriv, Ukraine
- Height: 1.87 m (6 ft 2 in)
- Position: Defender

Team information
- Current team: Metalist 1925 Kharkiv
- Number: 17

Youth career
- 2006–2009: VIK-Volyn Volodymyr-Volynskyi

Senior career*
| Years | Team | Apps | (Gls) |
| 2010 | Topilche (amateurs) | 3 | (0) |
| 2012–2017 | Ternopil | 150 | (10) |
| 2017–2022 | Ahrobiznes Volochysk | 123 | (9) |
| 2022– | Metalist 1925 Kharkiv | 46 | (0) |
- * Club domestic league appearances and goals as of 20 June 2024

Ihor Mykhaylovych Kurylo (Ukrainian: Ігор Михайлович Курило; born 3 May 1993) is a Ukrainian professional footballer who plays as a defender for Metalist 1925 Kharkiv.

== Club career ==
He began playing football at age 7. His first coach in the local sports school was Volodymyr Vasylchyshyn. Later he was invited to learn soccer skills for four years under the coach Vasiliy Matviykiv. At the same time he played in the Ukrainian Youth Football League for the team FC BRW-VIK Volodymyr-Volynskyi in Volodymyr.

After completing school he entered the Ternopil Volodymyr Hnatyuk National Pedagogical University, where there was a strong football team. After a while in 2011 he won a spot on the team, which won a regional championship, won a Super Cup and was a finalist of the Ukrainian Students' League.

In 2012, he began playing for FC Ternopil, which at the time was in the Ukrainian Second League. The team was promoted to the Ukrainian First League after finishing 3rd in the 2013–2014 season.

== International career ==
He was the captain of Ukraine national student football team at the 2015 Summer Universiade in South Korea.
