= 2014 Philippine Peace Cup =

2014 PFF Peace Cup

Tournament details
- Host country: Philippines
- Dates: September 3–6
- Teams: 4 (from 1 confederation)
- Venue: 1 (in 1 host city)

Final positions
- Champions: Myanmar (1st title)
- Runners-up: Philippines
- Third place: Palestine
- Fourth place: Chinese Taipei

Tournament statistics
- Matches played: 4
- Goals scored: 26 (6.5 per match)
- Top scorer: (Palestine) Ahmad Maher Wridat (5 goals)

The 2014 PFF Peace Cup was the third edition of the tournament, an international football competition organized by the Philippine Football Federation (PFF) to celebrate peace month in the country through football. It was held at the Rizal Memorial Stadium in Manila and was originally scheduled to take place from September 3–9, 2014. It was then revised to September 3–6 due to a change in format.

== Participants ==
PFF president Mariano Araneta stated that the teams being initially eyed are Chinese Taipei, Myanmar, Palestine and Vietnam. The PFF were due to announce the final list of invited teams on August 6, a day after the 2014 AFF Suzuki Cup draw in Hanoi, Vietnam. At the draw, where Philippines coach Thomas Dooley was in attendance, he revealed that Palestine, Myanmar and Vietnam were the invitees for the tournament. However, Vietnam would only take part if they were not drawn with the Philippines at the Suzuki Cup. Vietnam were however drawn with the Philippines therefore another team would need to be invited. On August 7, the PFF confirmed the participation of Myanmar, Palestine as well as Chinese Taipei which replaced Vietnam.

== Venue ==
Manila
Rizal Memorial Stadium	2014 Philippine Peace Cup (Philippines)
Capacity: 12,500	2014 Philippine Peace Cup (Philippines)

== Matches ==
The tournament was originally to be a single round-robin tournament format with match dates on September 3, 6 and 9. However, the PFF received an advisory from FIFA on August 28 informing them of the new "two-match per international window" regulations. Therefore, the PFF revised the format to allot a maximum of two matches.

=== Semifinals ===
September 3, 2014
16:00

Myanmar	4–1	Palestine
Kyaw Zayar Win 26', 49'; Tin Win Aung 38'; Nanda Lin Kyaw Chit 71'	Report	Wridat 87'

Rizal Memorial Stadium, Manila
Referee: Steve Supresencia (Philippines)
September 3, 2014
19:00

Philippines	5–1	Chinese Taipei
Gier 25'; J. Younghusband 37'; Chen Yi-wei 65' (o.g.); Hartmann 74', 88'	Report	Yen Ho-shen 80'

Rizal Memorial Stadium, Manila
Referee: Chanketya Thong (Cambodia)

=== Third place match ===
September 6, 2014
16:00

Palestine	7–3 (a.e.t.)	Chinese Taipei
Mereles 5'; Wridat 9', 107', 112', 117'; Abuhabib 90+2'; Bahdari 109'	Report	Wu Pai-ho 53' (pen.); Yen Ho-shen 76'; Lin Chang-lun 87'

Rizal Memorial Stadium, Manila
Referee: Thoriq Munir Al Katiri (Indonesia)

=== Final ===
September 6, 2014
19:00

Philippines	2–3 (a.e.t.)	Myanmar
Sato 50'; P. Younghusband 71' (pen.)	Report	Kyaw Ko Ko 8'; Min Min Thu 90+2'; Soe Min Oo 103'

Rizal Memorial Stadium, Manila
Referee: Xaypaseuth Phonsanit (Laos)

== Statistics ==
=== Awards ===
2014 Philippine Peace Cup champions

Myanmar
First title

=== Goalscorers ===
5 goals

- (Palestine) Ahmad Maher Wridat

2 goals

- (Chinese Taipei) Yen Ho-shen
- (Myanmar) Kyaw Zayar Win
- (Philippines) Mark Hartmann

1 goal

- (Chinese Taipei) Lin Chang-lun
- (Chinese Taipei) Wu Pai-ho
- (Myanmar) Kyaw Ko Ko
- (Myanmar) Min Min Thu
- (Myanmar) Nanda Lin Kyaw Chit
- (Myanmar) Soe Min Oo
- (Myanmar) Tin Win Aung
- (Palestine) Abdelhamid Abuhabib
- (Palestine) Abdelatif Bahdari
- (Palestine) Javier Mereles
- (Philippines) Rob Gier
- (Philippines) Daisuke Sato
- (Philippines) James Younghusband
- (Philippines) Phil Younghusband

1 own goal

- (Chinese Taipei) Chen Yi-wei (playing against the Philippines)
