= Fernando Falce =

Uruguayan football referee

- Full name: Fernando Martín Falce Langone
- Born: 19 February 1976 (age 50)

Domestic
Years	League	Role

International
Years	League	Role
2013–	FIFA listed	Referee

Fernando Martín Falce Langone (born 19 February 1976) is an Uruguayan professional football referee. He refereed some matches in Copa Libertadores and Copa Sudamericana. He has been a FIFA referee since 2015.

Falce played football as a goalkeeper in his youth, never playing at a level higher than the fourth division with Miramar Misiones' reserve team. He studied to become a referee, and made his Uruguayan Primera División debut at age 24.

On 6 June 2015, he refereed his first international match: Paraguay versus Honduras.

He was selected for the 2015 Summer Universiade.

He has a wife and 2 children (1 boy and 1 girl).

== See also ==
- Football in Uruguay
