= Rob Gier =

Association football coach and former player (born 1981)

Personal information
- Full name: Robert James Dazo Gier
- Date of birth: 6 January 1981 (age 45)
- Place of birth: Ascot, England
- Position: Centre back

Team information
- Current team: Philippines U22 (head coach)

Youth career
- Ascot United
- Wimbledon

Senior career*
| Years | Team | Apps | (Gls) |
| 2000–2004 | Wimbledon | 71 | (0) |
| 2004–2006 | Rushden & Diamonds | 67 | (2) |
| 2006–2007 | Cambridge United | 17 | (0) |
| 2007 | Woking | 7 | (0) |
| 2007–2008 | Aldershot Town | 38 | (0) |
| 2008–2009 | Grays Athletic | 18 | (0) |
| 2009–2016 | Ascot United | | |

International career
| 2009–2015 | Philippines | 66 | (2) |

Managerial career
- 2016–2018: Oxford University Women's
- 2018–2023: Reading F.C. Women (academy manager)
- 2023–: Philippines U22
- * Club domestic league appearances and goals

Robert James Dazo Gier (born 6 January 1981) is a football coach and former player who is the head coach of the Philippines U22 team. As a player, he was mainly a centre-back.

Born in England, he progressed through the youth system of Wimbledon, making his debut in the Football League First Division in October 2000 and played until their final season. He then played for League Two club Rushden & Diamonds until their relegation in 2006. He then played in the Conference National for Cambridge United, Woking, and Aldershot Town with whom he won the 2007–08 Conference Premier title and Conference League Cup. After a brief spell with Grays Athletic, he spent the remainder of his career with his hometown club Ascot United in the Hellenic Football League.

Eligible to represent the Philippines national team through his mother, Gier made his international debut in 2009. He captained the Philippines in the 2012 and 2014 AFF Championships.

== Early life ==
Rob Gier was born to Robert Gier and Rosario and grew up in Ascot, England. Upon coming from work, Rob's father would often bring him to football training. His mother, Rosario is a Waray from Tacloban, Leyte.

== Club career ==
Gier began his career at Wimbledon, who had been relegated from the Premiership in 1999–00 season. He made his debut the following season, starting a 0–0 home draw with Sheffield United on 28 October 2000.

In 2004, he joined Rushden & Diamonds, and was part of the side that was relegated from the Football League in 2005–06. He left the club following their relegation, and had spells in the Conference with Cambridge United, and Woking during the 2006–07 season.

He joined Aldershot Town at the start of the 2007–08 season, and was part of the side that won the Conference with a record points total. He made 38 league appearances for the club, all starts, but despite this was released at the end of the campaign.

On 22 May 2008, Grays Athletic announced they had signed Gier on a one-year contract, however, he was transfer listed by the club in January 2009, with financial pressures and manager Wayne Burnett's plans being cited as the reason.

Gier joined Hellenic League Premier Division club Ascot United in November 2009, after being released at the end of the previous season by Grays Athletic. He announced his retirement in February 2016.

== International career ==
Gier was called up to the Philippines national team in March 2009, for the 2010 AFC Challenge Cup qualifiers in April, where they were due to face, Turkmenistan, Bhutan and the Maldives. He made his international debut in 2010 AFC Challenge Cup qualification match against Bhutan on 14 April 2009 and also played against Maldives and Turkmenistan.

On 10 September 2012 Gier scored his first international goal for the Philippines in a 2–1 loss to Laos, however it was not a FIFA-sanctioned match. FIFA did not recognize the match's results after it was found out that the referees who officiated the match were not recognized by the world sporting body.

He scored his first official international goal for the Philippines in the 2014 Philippine Peace Cup against Chinese Taipei.

=== International goals ===
Scores and results list the Philippines' goal tally first.

| # | Date | Venue | Opponent | Score | Result | Competition |
|---|---|---|---|---|---|---|
| 1. | 3 September 2014 | Rizal Memorial Stadium, Manila | Chinese Taipei | 1–0 | 5–1 | 2014 Philippine Peace Cup |
| 2. | 25 November 2014 | Mỹ Đình National Stadium, Hanoi | Indonesia | 4–0 | 4–0 | 2014 AFF Suzuki Cup |

=== Retirement ===
On 17 February 2016 Gier announced his retirement from playing competitive football at the age of 35. Gier is set to focus on operating Zenith Soccer Tours and spending more time with his family.

Earlier in 2014, Gier established Zenith Soccer Tours, a youth football program in the United Kingdom. The idea was concepted by Gier, after he met with the Philippine national youth team who had a three-week training camp in the UK in 2013.

== Coaching career ==
=== Oxford University (Women's) ===
In November 2016, Gier was appointed as head coach of the women's football team of the University of Oxford. He served in this role until May 2018.

Gier obtained a UEFA A coaching licence by September 2017. While still playing for the national team and Ascot United, he began finishing a two-year course to obtain the UEFA A coaching licence. He plans to coach in the United Kingdom while working for a UEFA Pro Licence that would make him eligible to coach in the FA Premier League and UEFA competitions. He has expressed his openness to coach for the Philippine national team.

=== Reading (Women's) ===
In 2017, Gier began working with Reading F.C. Women as its women's development coach. He was eventually promoted as the Reading F.C. Women academy manager in July 2018.

=== Philippines U22 ===
In March 2023, the Philippine Football Federation announced that Rob Gier was appointed as the new head coach of Philippines U22.

== Honours ==
=== Club ===
Aldershot Town

- Conference National: 2007–08
- Conference League Cup: 2007–08

=== International ===
Philippines

- AFC Challenge Cup: Third 2012
- Philippine Peace Cup: 2013

== Personal life ==
Gier is married and has two children. His family resides in England.
