= Seo Young-jae =

South Korean footballer

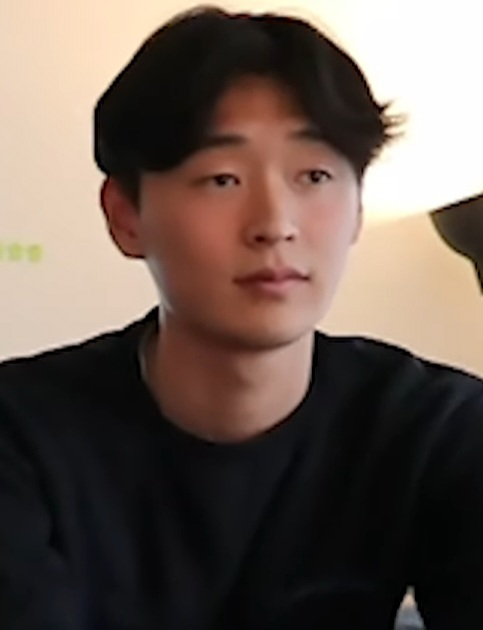
- GOAL Interview, 2020

Personal information
- Date of birth: 23 May 1995 (age 31)
- Place of birth: Wonju, Gangwon, South Korea
- Height: 1.82 m (6 ft 0 in)
- Position: Left back

Team information
- Current team: Daejeon Hana Citizen
- Number: 23

Youth career
- 2014–2015: Hanyang University

Senior career*
Years	Team	Apps	(Gls)
2015–2018	Hamburger SV II	60	(2)
2018–2019	MSV Duisburg	7	(0)
2019–2020	Holstein Kiel	9	(0)
2021–	Daejeon Hana Citizen	73	(0)
2024–2025	→ Dangjin Citizen (loan)	28	(2)

International career^{‡}
2015–2016	South Korea U23	7	(0)
2015	South Korea Universiade	5	(1)
Medal record
Representing South Korea
Men's football
Summer Universiade
Silver medal – second place	2015 Gwangju	Team
- * Club domestic league appearances and goals as of 3 August 2026 ‡ National team caps and goals as of 13:41, 5 May 2019 (UTC)

Seo Young-jae (Korean: 서영재; born 23 May 1995) is a South Korean professional footballer who plays as a left-back for Daejeon Hana Citizen.

== Club career ==
After moving to MSV Duisburg in the summer of 2018, he moved to Holstein Kiel for the 2019–20 season.

== International career ==
Seo was included in South Korea's squad for the 2014 edition of the AFC U-19 Championship in Myanmar, but did not make an appearance in the tournament. The following year, he was included in South Korea's squad for the football tournament at the 2015 Summer Universiade in Gwangju, South Korea. In the group stage, Seo opened the scoring in the 18th minute against Canada, which finished as a 3–1 win for South Korea. Overall, he scored one goal in five appearances, with South Korea finishing as runners-up after losing 0–3 to Italy in the Gold medal match.

Seo also appeared for South Korea's under-23 team, appearing seven times from 2015 to 2016.

== Honours ==
South Korea Universiade

- Summer Universiade silver medal: 2015
