= Ahmad Maher Wridat =

Palestinian footballer

Personal information
- Date of birth: 22 July 1991 (age 35)
- Place of birth: ad-Dhahiriya, Palestine
- Height: 1.69 m (5 ft 7 in)
- Position: Forward

Youth career
- 2006–2010: Shabab Al-Dhahiriya

Senior career*
Years	Team	Apps	(Gls)
2010–2014	Shabab Al-Dhahiriya	42	(11)
2014–2016	Ahli Al-Khaleel	36	(4)
2016–2017	Shabab Al-Dhahiriya	10	(7)
2017	Al-Wehdat	11	(1)
2017–	Shabab Al-Dhahiriya		

International career^{‡}
2014	Palestine U23	4	(2)
2014–	Palestine	22	(8)
- * Club domestic league appearances and goals as of 6 May 2017 ‡ National team caps and goals as of 27 March 2018

Ahmad Maher Wridat (Arabic: أحمد ماهر وريدات; born 22 July 1991) is a Palestinian footballer who plays as a forward for Shabab Al-Dhahiriya and the Palestine national football team. He holds the honor of being the first Palestinian to score in the AFC Champions League having scored in Al-Wehdat's 2–1 win over Bengaluru FC in February 2017.

== International career ==
On 6 September 2014, Wridat helped Palestine to take third place in the Philippines Peace Cup after scoring four goals against Chinese Taipei, including three in extra time to finish top scorer with five goals.

=== International goals ===
Scores and results list Palestine's goal tally first.

#	Date	Venue	Opponent	Score	Result	Competition
1.	3 September 2014	Rizal Memorial Stadium, Manila, Philippines	Myanmar	1–4	1–4	2014 Philippine Peace Cup
2.	6 September 2014	Rizal Memorial Stadium, Manila, Philippines	Chinese Taipei	2–0	7–3	2014 Philippine Peace Cup
3.	6 September 2014	Rizal Memorial Stadium, Manila, Philippines	Chinese Taipei	4–3	7–3	2014 Philippine Peace Cup
4.	6 September 2014	Rizal Memorial Stadium, Manila, Philippines	Chinese Taipei	6–3	7–3	2014 Philippine Peace Cup
5.	6 September 2014	Rizal Memorial Stadium, Manila, Philippines	Chinese Taipei	7–3	7–3	2014 Philippine Peace Cup
6.	6 October 2014	Kanchenjunga Stadium, Siliguri, India	India	2–2	3–2	Friendly
7.	28 March 2017	National Football Stadium, Malé, Maldives	Maldives	1–0	3–0	2019 AFC Asian Cup qualification
8.	28 March 2017	National Football Stadium, Malé, Maldives	Maldives	2–0	3–0	2019 AFC Asian Cup qualification

=== International goals U-23 ===
Scores and results list Palestine's goal tally first.

#	Date	Venue	Opponent	Score	Result	Competition
1.	14 September 2014	Ansan Wa~ Stadium, Ansan	Oman	1–0	2–0	2014 Asian Games
2.	21 September 2014	Ansan Wa~ Stadium, Ansan	Singapore	1–2	1–2	2014 Asian Games

== Honours ==
=== Shabab Al-Dhahiriya ===
- West Bank Premier League: 2012–13

=== Individual ===
- Philippine Peace Cup Top Scorer: 2014
