= Mark Hartmann =

Filipino footballer (born 1992)

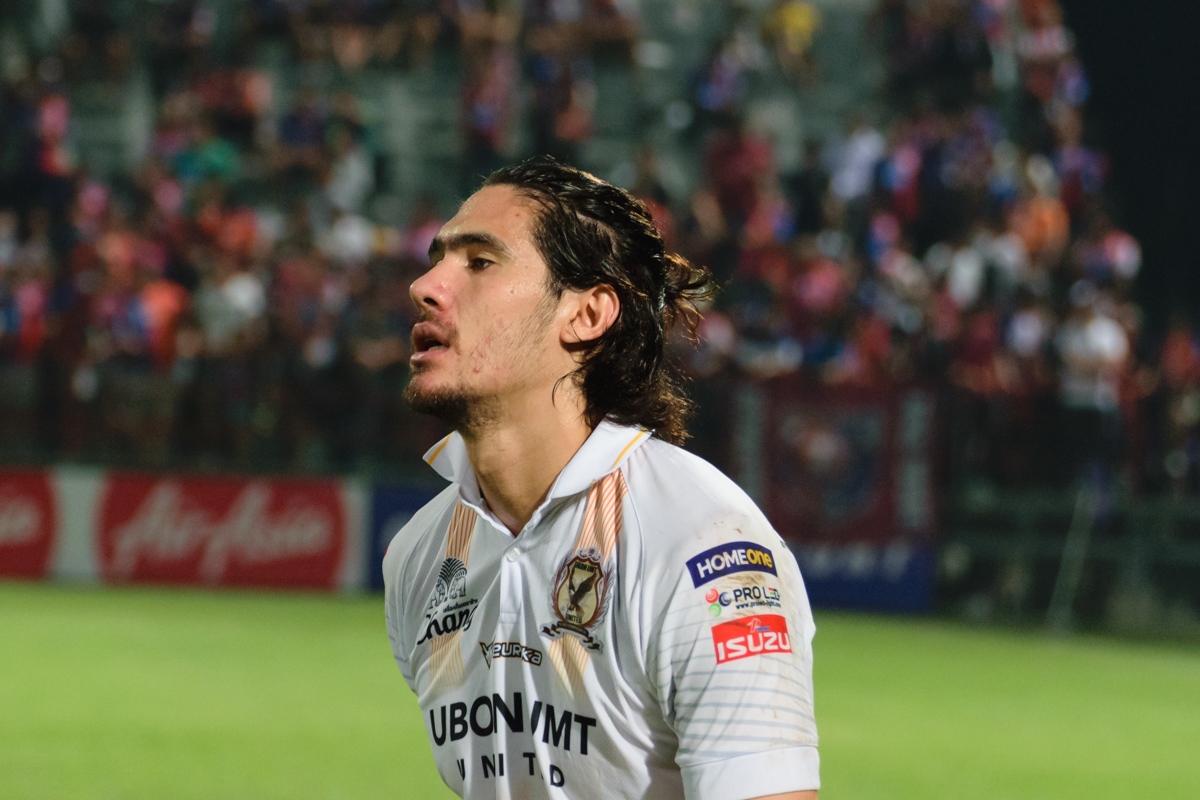
- Hartmann playing for Ubon United in 2018.

Personal information
- Full name: Mark Andrew Calibjo Hartmann
- Date of birth: 20 January 1992 (age 34)
- Place of birth: Southampton, England
- Height: 1.84 m (6 ft 0 in)
- Positions: Forward; attacking midfielder

Youth career
- Southampton
- Portsmouth
- –2010: Swindon Town

Senior career*
Years	Team	Apps	(Gls)
2010	Blackfield & Langley	5	(3)
2011	Manila Nomads		
2011–2013	Loyola	34	(25)
2013–2016	Global	51	(49)
2016	Geylang International	12	(7)
2016–2017	Sarawak	12	(3)
2017–2018	Penang	8	(2)
2018	Ubon United	14	(5)
2018	Ratchaburi	9	(1)
2018–2019	Suphanburi	11	(1)
2019	Nakhon Ratchasima	12	(1)
2019–2020	United City	2	(0)
2020–2021	Petaling Jaya City	3	(0)
2020	→ UiTM (loan)	6	(1)
2021–2023	United City	17	(6)
2023	Nakhon Si United	4	(0)
2024	United City	13	(4)
2025	Stallion Laguna	8	(0)
2025–2026	One Taguig	9	(1)

International career
2011–2012	Philippines U23	7	(2)
2011–2023	Philippines	41	(8)
- * Club domestic league appearances and goals as of 22:57, 27 February 2026 (UTC)

Mark Andrew Calibjo Hartmann (born 20 January 1992) is a former professional footballer who played as a forward or an attacking midfielder. Born in England, he played for the Philippines national team.

== Club career ==
As a youngster, Hartmann had stints with Portsmouth and then at Swindon Town where he was eventually released at the end of the 2009–10 season.

=== Blackfield & Langley F.C. ===
In 2010, he joined Wessex Football League side Blackfield & Langley. On 9 November 2010, he scored a hat-trick in a 4–2 win over Alresford Town.

=== Manila Nomads Sports Club ===
After his stint with Blackfield & Langley, he moved to the Philippines where he joined Manila Nomads.

=== Loyola F.C. ===
In the 2010–11 United Football League mid-season transfer window, he joined Loyola and then scored his first goal in a 2–1 defeat to the Philippine Air Force. He scored a further seven goals in Loyola's final three games which included a hat-trick against the Philippine Navy, and a quadruple on the final day of the season in a 5–2 win.

On 15 October 2011, Hartmann scored five goals in a 15–1 win over newcomer Team Socceroo in the 2011–12 United Football Cup.

=== Global F.C. ===
From 2013 to 2016, he played with Global and scored the most goals in a single season after tallying 27 goals during the 2014 UFL season.

=== Geylang International FC ===
On 10 June 2016, Geylang International announced on their Facebook page that they signed Hartmann from Global, making him the first Filipino to play in the S. League. He signed a short-term contract with Geylang that lasted until December 2016. He debuted in a match against Albirex Niigata (S) at the 2016 Singapore Cup on 1 July 2016. He made 8 goals for Geylang in 11 appearances. Geyland decided not to renew Hartmann's contract due to budgetary constraints and clubs from Thailand, Malaysia, and the Philippines has expressed interest to sign him.

=== Sarawak FA ===
He underwent trials at Sarawak in November 2016. By 16 December, Hartmann signed a season-long contract with Sarawak. He scored his first goal for Sarawak against Kedah with a stunning free-kick. He scored hat trick against MISC-Mifa in Malaysia FA Cup. He scored a total of seven goals from fifteen appearances, three in the league and four in the Malaysia FA Cup. His contract was then terminated in May 2017.

=== Penang FA ===
After leaving Sarawak, Penang signed Hartmann as a free agent.

=== Ubon United F.C. ===
After his spell at Malaysia, he joined Thai League 1 outfit Ubon United. He scored his first goal for Ubon United in a 3–1 away defeat against Nakhon Ratchasima. In early May, after making 14 appearances and scoring five goals, he was one of five players released by the club. He joined Ratchaburi after being released from Ubon United, reported in a FOX Sports Asia article.

== International career ==
In September 2011, he joined the Philippine national team training pool and was named in the final 20-man squad for the 2011 Long Teng Cup and the provisional Philippines under-23 squad for the 2011 Southeast Asian Games. In the Long Teng Cup, he made his full international debut in the 3–3 draw against Hong Kong.

He made his first appearance for the under-23 national team in the 3–1 loss against Vietnam in the opening match of the 2011 Southeast Asian Games.

He scored his first and second international goal during the 2014 Philippine Peace Cup against Chinese Taipei.

On 12 October 2014, Hartmann scored a super hat-trick during the first half in a 5–0 victory over Papua New Guinea.

In 2024, he played for the national seven-a-side which finished second in the Asia 7s tournament.

=== International goals ===
Scores and results list the Philippines' goal tally first.

#	Date	Venue	Opponent	Score	Result	Competition
2014
1.	3 September 2014	Rizal Memorial Stadium, Manila, Philippines	Chinese Taipei	4–0	5–1	2014 Philippine Peace Cup
2.	3 September 2014	Rizal Memorial Stadium, Manila, Philippines	Chinese Taipei	5–1	5–1	2014 Philippine Peace Cup
3.	12 October 2014	Rizal Memorial Stadium, Manila, Philippines	Papua New Guinea	1–0	5–0	Friendly
4.	12 October 2014	Rizal Memorial Stadium, Manila, Philippines	Papua New Guinea	2–0	5–0	Friendly
5.	12 October 2014	Rizal Memorial Stadium, Manila, Philippines	Papua New Guinea	3–0	5–0	Friendly
6.	12 October 2014	Rizal Memorial Stadium, Manila, Philippines	Papua New Guinea	5–0	5–0	Friendly
7.	31 October 2014	Grand Hamad Stadium, Doha, Qatar	Nepal	3–0	3–0	Friendly
2021
8.	11 June 2021	Sharjah Stadium, Sharjah, United Arab Emirates	Guam	3–0	3–0	2022 FIFA World Cup qualification

== Coaching career ==
Hartmann became the first coach of the women's team of the Manila Nomads known as the Nomads StretchMarks.

== Honours ==
Global

- United Football League: Winner 2014
- United Football League: 2014 Golden Boot award

== Personal life ==
He is the youngest among the brothers Darren Hartmann, who has played for the Philippine U-21's during the 2005 Hassanal Bolkiah Trophy, and Matthew Hartmann, who was a Philippines under-23 and senior international footballer.
