= Oxford University W.A.F.C. =

Association football club in England

Oxford University
- Full name: Oxford University; Women's Association Football Club
- Nickname(s): Blues
- Founded: 1986; 39 years ago
- Ground: Marston Sports Ground, Oxford, England
- President: (England) Erin Robinson
- Head Coach: (England) Russell Hullett
- League: BUCS MARS Midlands Division 1A
- 2013-14: BUCS MARS Midlands Division 2A, 1st
- Website: https://www.ouafc.club/womens-teams
Home colours

Oxford University Women’s Association Football Club is an English football club representing the University of Oxford. The club consists of two squads, the Blues (1st XI) and the Furies (2nd XI). Both teams compete in the BUCS League against other British universities. The Blues won BUCS Midlands Division 2A in the 2013/2014 season, gaining them promotion into Midlands Division 1A. The Blues have retained their place in this league for the 2016/17 season. The Furies won the Midlands 3A league in 2015/16, gaining promotion to the 2A division.

== History ==
The club was founded in the 1980s and merged with Oxford University A.F.C., the respective men's club, in 1998.

== BUCS ==
The Blues and Furies compete in BUCS Midlands Division 1A and 2A respectively. The fixtures run from October through March.

== Varsity match ==
The climax of the season for both teams is the varsity match against Cambridge University. Those women selected to compete in the Blues varsity match receive an Oxford Half-Blue in recognition of their footballing success, with the Full Blue status being achieved if Oxford win the match, or the squad have a "successful" season in BUCS with regards to the Blues status conditions. In 2016, Oxford won the 31st varsity match 1-0.

The first women's varsity match was played in 1986, in which Oxford clinched the victory, beating the Light Blue side 4-3. As of 2016, out of the 29 Blues varsity matches to date, only 2 ended in draws, with the Dark Blues winning just 8 of the games. However, considering just the last 10 years up to 2016, the dark blues have won on 4 accounts.

== Blues status ==
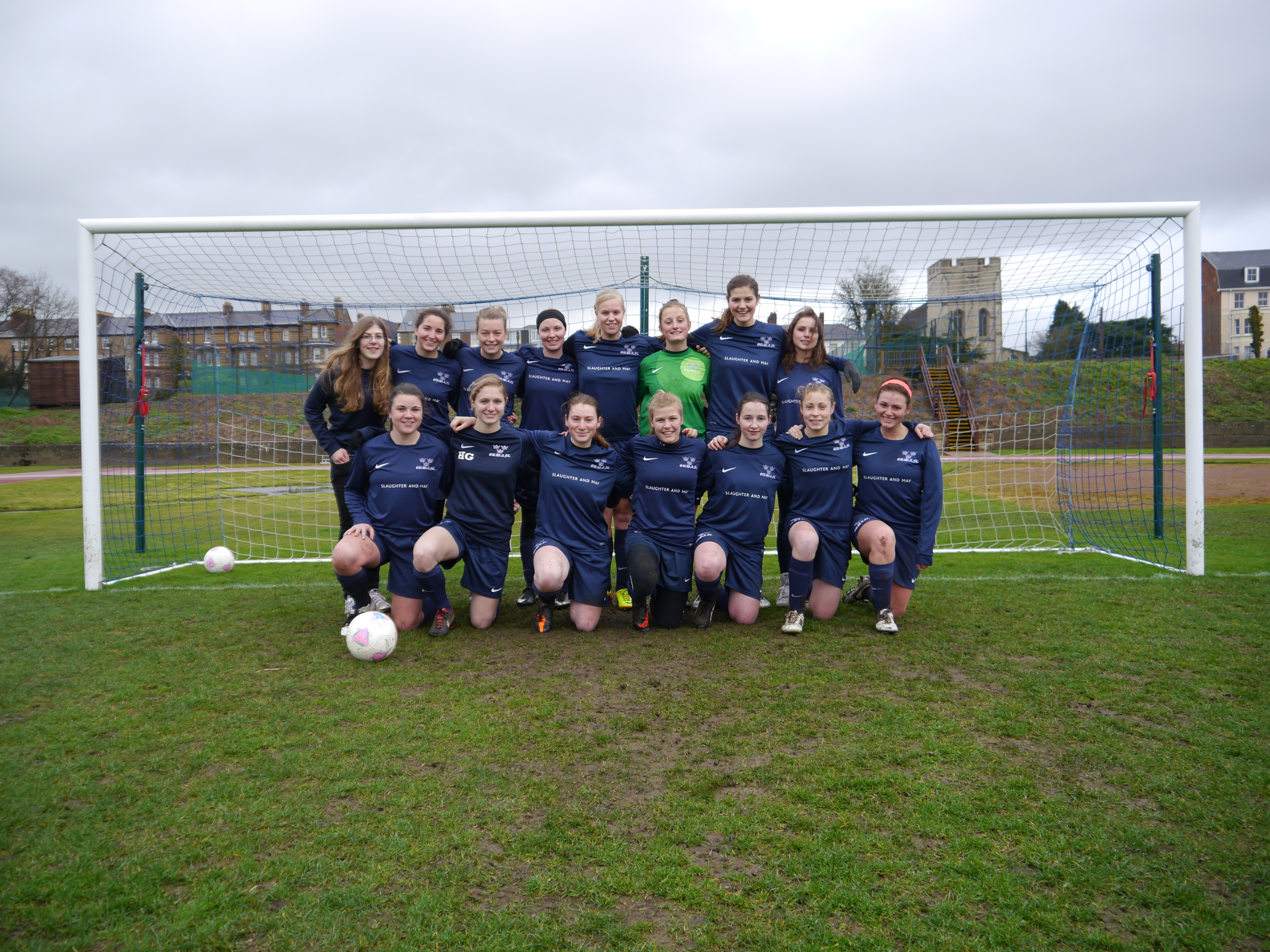
Blues Squad 13/14

The women who compete in the Blues varsity match are awarded with an Oxford Blue under the following criteria:

Half Blue: 14 awards maximum to all those who play in the varsity match; subs must have played for at least 5 minutes.

Full Blue: 14 awards maximum. Awarded to women who play in the varsity match AND fulfil any of the following criteria:

Win the varsity match OR The team reaches the semi-final of the Midlands Conference Cup (any player reaching this must have been selected for at least 50% of the cup matches) OR The team gets promoted that season

== Current squads ==
As of 7 February 2016, the Blues varsity squad is as follows: Note: Flags indicate national team as defined under FIFA eligibility rules; some limited exceptions apply. Players may hold more than one non-FIFA nationality.

No.	Pos.	Nation	Player
1	GK	(England) ENG	May Martin
2	DF	(England) ENG	Maddie Hooper
3	DF	(Scotland) SCO	Anna Green
4	DF	(Australia) AUS	Sien Van der Plank
5	DF	(England) ENG	Helen Bridgman
6	MF	(England) ENG	Ellie Backhouse
7	MF	(United States) USA	Colleen Lopez

No.	Pos.	Nation	Player
8	FW	(United States) USA	Chantal Paine
9	FW	(England) ENG	Christina Gough
10	MF	(England) ENG	Sian Kelly
11	FW	(Switzerland) SUI	Sonia Curtis
12	FW	(England) ENG	Mary Hintze
13	DF	(England) ENG	Claudia Hill
16	GK	(United States) USA	Kirstin Anderson
17	MF	(United States) USA	Zoe Wallace

The alumni squad playing the Blues in the hotly anticipated annual Alumni match, was as follows for the 19/20 season:

Note: Flags indicate national team as defined under FIFA eligibility rules; some limited exceptions apply. Players may hold more than one non-FIFA nationality.

No.	Pos.	Nation	Player
3	DF	(Scotland) SCO	Anna Green
4	MF	(United States) USA	Sarah Shao
5	DF	(England) ENG	Chloe Coates
6	MF	(England) ENG	Lucie Bowden
7	MF	(England) ENG	Viola Lough
8	MF	(England) ENG	Katharine Nutman
9	FW	(England) ENG	Sophie Cooper
10	FW	(England) ENG	Anna Simpson
11	FW	(United States) USA	Chantal Paine
12	FW	(England) ENG	Holly Bridge
14	DF	(England) ENG	Julia Chen

The match, played on 22 February 2020 at the Oxford City football stadium, ended in a 6-0 win for the alumni squad.

== College football ==
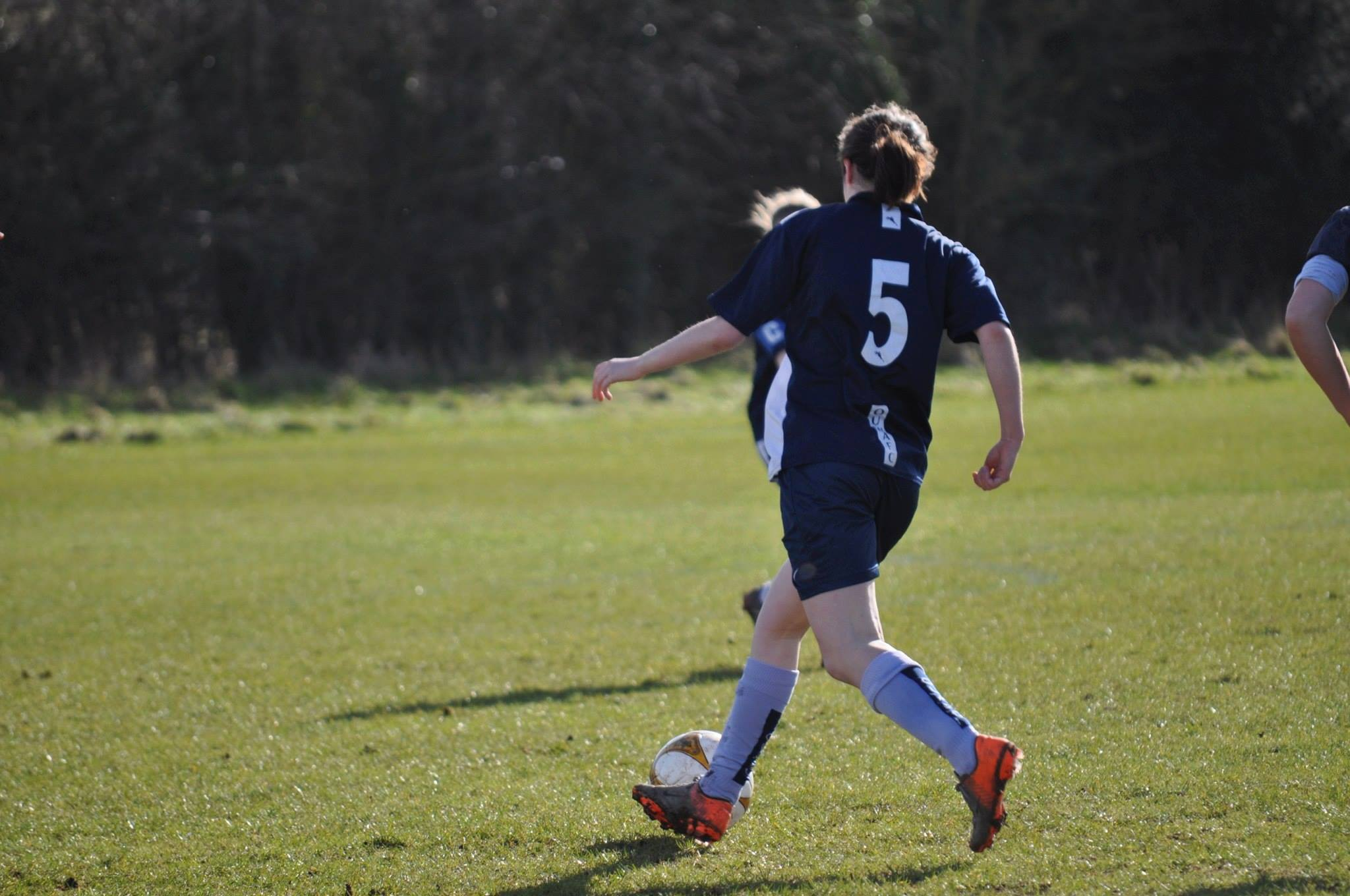
A Furies player 13/14

24 women's college teams are registered to the Women’s College League, of which there are four divisions. Eight of these are joint teams made up of two or three colleges. The college teams also compete in the Cuppers competition, which was won by Worcester College in the season 2013/2014, with a 1-0 victory over Keble/Hertford.

== Notable alumni ==
Notable alumni include Ananya Birla (singer and entrepreneur), Rachel Riley (TV presenter) and Jen O'Neill (editor of She Kicks women's football magazine).
