= Daichi Tagami =

Japanese footballer (born 1993)

Daichi Tagami 田上 大地
Personal information
- Full name: Daichi Tagami
- Date of birth: June 16, 1993 (age 33)
- Place of birth: Chiba, Japan
- Height: 1.79 m (5 ft 10 1/2 in)
- Positions: Centre back; right back

Team information
- Current team: Fagiano Okayama
- Number: 18

Youth career
- 2009–2011: RKU Kashiwa High School

College career
| Years | Team | Apps | (Gls) |
| 2012–2015 | Ryutsu Keizai University | | |

Senior career*
| Years | Team | Apps | (Gls) |
| 2016–2018 | V-Varen Nagasaki | 66 | (4) |
| 2019–2022 | Kashiwa Reysol | 7 | (0) |
| 2020–2022 | → Albirex Niigata (loan) | 54 | (3) |
| 2022–2024 | Albirex Niigata | 34 | (2) |
| 2024– | Fagiano Okayama | 76 | (7) |
- * Club domestic league appearances and goals as of 12 August 2026

Daichi Tagami (田上 大地, Tagami Daichi; born June 16, 1993) is a Japanese football player who plays as a defender for Fagiano Okayama.

== University career ==
In 2011, whilst playing for Ryutsu Keizai University, Tagami was converted to a forward and became the top goalscorer in the All Japan High School Athletic Meet Soccer Tournament.

In 2014, he was reconverted to a center back. On 3 March 2015, Tagami was called up to the DENSO Cup All Japan University Selected Team, for their tour of Spain from March 6 to March 20.

== Career ==
On 15 August 2015, Tagami was announced at Tochigi SC as a specially designated player.

Daichi Tagami joined J2 League club V-Varen Nagasaki in 2016. He made his league debut against Kyoto Sanga on 20 March 2016. On 6 September 2016, after playing 900 minutes for V-Varen Nagasaki, Tagami signed a professional A contract with the club.

On 16 December 2016, he extended his contract for the 2017 season. Tagami scored his first league goal against Roasso Kumamoto on 28 October 2017, scoring in the 27th minute.

On 7 January 2019, Tagami was announced at Kashiwa Reysol. On 4 January 2020, Tagami was announced at Albirex Niigata on a one year loan deal.

On 8 January 2022, Tagami was announced at Albirex Niigata on a permanent transfer. On 18 December 2022, Tagami's contract with the club was renewed for the 2023 season. On 28 November 2023, the club announced that his contract would not be renewed for the 2024 season. On 27 December 2023, Tagami was announced at Fagiano Okayama.

== Personal life ==
Tagami is known for having a good relationship with his adoptive father, Yuji Yabu.

== Career statistics ==
Updated to end of 2018 season.

Appearances and goals by club, season and competition
| Club | Season | League | | | Emperor's Cup | | J.League Cup | | Total | |
| Club | Season | Division | Apps | Goals | Apps | Goals | Apps | Goals | Apps | Goals |
|---|---|---|---|---|---|---|---|---|---|---|
| V-Varen Nagasaki | 2016 | J2 League | 15 | 0 | 1 | 0 | - | | 16 | 0 |
| V-Varen Nagasaki | 2017 | J2 League | 24 | 1 | 1 | 0 | - | | 25 | 1 |
| V-Varen Nagasaki | 2018 | J1 League | 27 | 3 | 2 | 0 | 2 | 0 | 31 | 3 |
| Kashiwa Reysol | 2019 | J2 League | 7 | 0 | 2 | 0 | 5 | 0 | 14 | 0 |
| Albirex Niigata | 2020 | J2 League | 30 | 3 | 0 | 0 | 0 | 0 | 30 | 3 |
| Albirex Niigata | 2021 | J2 League | 24 | 0 | 2 | 1 | 0 | 0 | 26 | 1 |
| Albirex Niigata | 2022 | J2 League | 23 | 2 | 1 | 0 | 0 | 0 | 24 | 2 |
| Albirex Niigata | 2023 | J1 League | 11 | 0 | 0 | 0 | 6 | 0 | 17 | 0 |
| Career total | | | 66 | 4 | 4 | 0 | 4 | 0 | 72 | 4 |
