= Lin Chang-lun =

Taiwanese footballer

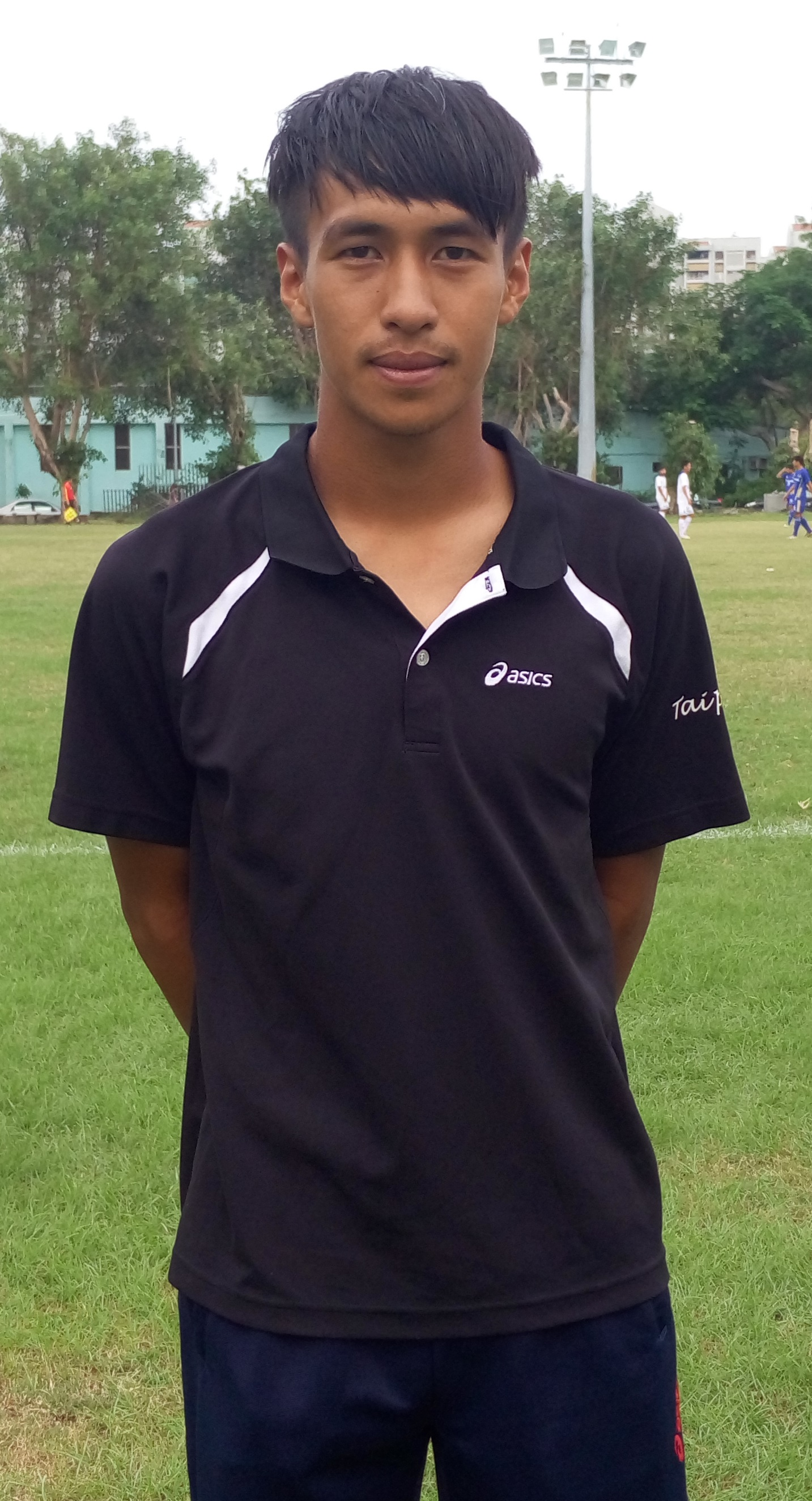
- Lin Chang-lun in 2015

Personal information
- Date of birth: 28 June 1991 (age 35)
- Place of birth: Hualien, Taiwan
- Height: 1.71 m (5 ft 7 in)
- Position: Forward

Team information
- Current team: Taiwan Power Company

Senior career*
| Years | Team | Apps | (Gls) |
| 2014–2015 | NSTC | | |
| 2016– | Taiwan Power Company | | |

International career^{‡}
| 2012– | Chinese Taipei | 40 | (2) |
- * Club domestic league appearances and goals ‡ National team caps and goals as of 15 June 2021

Lin Chang-lun (Chinese: 林昌倫; pinyin: Lín Chānglún; born 28 June 1991) is a Taiwanese footballer who currently plays as a forward at the national and club level. Lin is a member of the Amis people and has served in the armed forces, although he cut his time short in the army to focus on his football career.

== International goals ==
.Scores and results are list Taiwan's goal tally first.

| No. | Date | Venue | Opponent | Score | Result | Competition |
|---|---|---|---|---|---|---|
| 1. | 11 October 2013 | Panaad Stadium, Bacolod, Philippines | Philippines | 2–1 | 2–1 | 2013 Philippine Peace Cup |
| 2. | 6 September 2014 | Rizal Memorial Stadium, Manila, Philippines | Palestine | 3–2 | 3–7 | 2014 Philippine Peace Cup |
