= Chen Yi-wei =

Taiwanese footballer

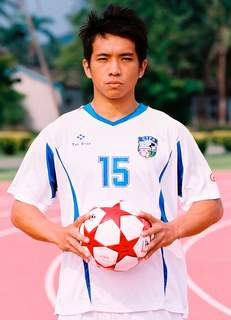

Personal information
- Full name: Chen Yi-wei
- Date of birth: 27 March 1987 (age 39)
- Place of birth: Kaohsiung, Taiwan
- Height: 1.75 m (5 ft 9 in)
- Position: Defender

Team information
- Current team: Taipower
- Number: 12

Youth career
- 2002–2005: Chung-Cheng High School

Senior career*
| Years | Team | Apps | (Gls) |
| 2005–2009 | NTUS | | |
| 2009–2010 | NSTC | | |
| 2011– | Taipower | | |

International career^{‡}
| 2006– | Chinese Taipei | 61 | (3) |
- * Club domestic league appearances and goals ‡ National team caps and goals as of 10 June 2020

Chen Yi-wei (Chinese: 陳毅維; pinyin: Chén Yìwéi; born 27 March 1987) is a Taiwanese football player. He plays as a defender.

== International career ==
=== International goals ===
Scores and results list Chinese Taipei's goal tally first.

| No. | Date | Venue | Opponent | Score | Result | Competition |
|---|---|---|---|---|---|---|
| 1. | 30 June 2016 | GFA National Training Center, Dededo, Guam | Northern Mariana Islands | 4–0 | 8–1 | 2017 EAFF E-1 Football Championship qualification |
| 2. | 11 October 2016 | National Stadium, Kaohsiung, Taiwan | Timor-Leste | 1–0 | 2–1 | 2019 AFC Asian Cup qualification |
| 3. | 15 October 2019 | National Stadium, Kaohsiung, Taiwan | Australia | 1–2 | 1–7 | 2022 FIFA World Cup qualification |

== Education ==
- National Taiwan College of Physical Education
