= Yen Ho-shen =

Taiwanese footballer

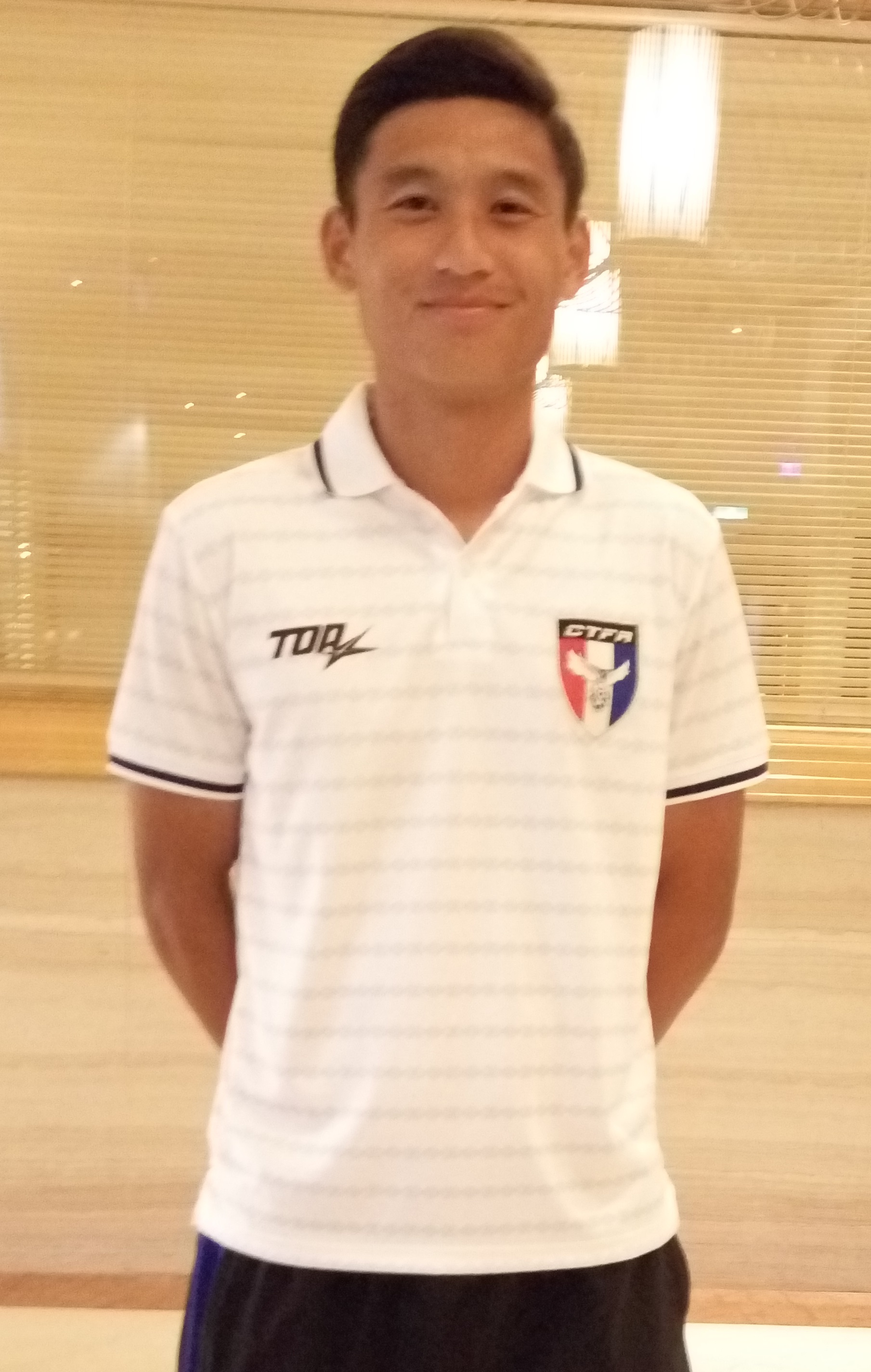
- Yen Ho-shen in 2016

Personal information
- Date of birth: December 31, 1990 (age 35)
- Place of birth: Hualien, Taiwan
- Height: 1.79 m (5 ft 10 1/2 in)
- Position: Centre back

Team information
- Current team: Taiwan Power Company
- Number: 6

Senior career*
| Years | Team | Apps | (Gls) |
| 2013–2015 | Taiwan University of Sport | | |
| 2015– | Taiwan Power Company | | |

International career^{‡}
| 2014– | Chinese Taipei | 12 | (2) |
- * Club domestic league appearances and goals ‡ National team caps and goals as of 4 July 2016

Yen Ho-shen (Chinese: 嚴和生; born 31 December 1990) is a Taiwanese footballer who currently plays as a centre back at the national and club level.

== International goals ==
Scores and results are list Taiwan's goal tally first.

| No. | Date | Venue | Opponent | Score | Result | Competition |
|---|---|---|---|---|---|---|
| 1. | 3 September 2014 | Rizal Memorial Stadium, Manila, Philippines | Philippines | 1–4 | 1–5 | 2014 Philippine Peace Cup |
| 2. | 6 September 2014 | Rizal Memorial Stadium, Manila, Philippines | Palestine | 2–2 | 3–7 | 2014 Philippine Cup |
