= List of Palestinian Chileans =

This is a list of notable Palestinian Chileans, including both original immigrants who obtained Chilean citizenship and their Chilean descendants, with a Wikipedia article or references showing they are Palestinian Chilean and are notable .

The list is ordered by category of human endeavour. Persons with significant contributions in two fields are listed in each of the pertinent categories, to facilitate easy lookup.

== List ==
=== Academics ===
- Diamela Eltit, professor at many universities in the United States, teacher at the Creative Writing Program in Spanish for the New York University
- Lina Meruane, teacher at the Creative Writing Program in Spanish for the New York University
- Juan Carlos Muñoz, professor in the Department of Transport and Logistics Engineering at the Pontifical Catholic University of Chile, director of Centro de Desarrollo Urbano Sustentable (CEDEUS) (Center for Sustainable Urban Development)

=== Authors, poets, playwrights, and journalists ===
- Diamela Eltit, writer, recipient of the National Prize for Literature (2018)
- Mahfúd Massís, writer and poet
- Lina Meruane, writer and professor, recipient of the Premio José Donoso (2023)
- Andrés Sabella, writer, poet and journalist
- Alia Trabucco Zerán, writer
- Faride Zerán, journalist, recipient of National Prize for Journalism (2007), President of the National Television Council of Chile (2022–2023)

=== Business and commerce ===
- Carlos Abumohor, businessman who was involved in a number of financial activities in the development of Chilean banking, media and real estate sectors.
- Nicolás Abumohor, businessman alongside his brother Carlos and member of SOFOFA
- Alejandra Mustakis, entrepreneur, founding member of several companies and the driving force behind multiple initiatives and programs for entrepreneurship
- Miguel Nasur, businessman who has been involved in companies such as National Airlines, casinos, radio media and finances
- José Said, founder of Parque Arauco
- Álvaro Saieh, businessman listed as the 729th wealthiest person in the world and 4th in Chile by Forbes in 2018, President of CorpGroup
- Amador Yarur, banker, owner of Textil Yarur
- Jorge Yarur Banna, banker
- Juan Yarur Lolas, banker
- Luis Enrique Yarur, lawyer, former president of Banco de Crédito e Inversiones.

=== Film, performing, and visual arts ===
- Jordi Castell, photographer
- Andrea Eltit, actress
- Camila Hirane, actress
- Checho Hirane, humorist
- Alfredo Jaar, artist, architect, photographer and filmmaker
- Miguel Littin, film director, screenwriter, film producer and novelist
- Nelly Meruane, actress and teacher
- Ricardo Meruane, humorist
- Teresita Reyes, actress
- Jorge Said, journalist, photographer and series director
- Marcela Said, film director and screenwriter
- Marko Zaror, actor and martial artist

=== Judiciary ===
- Sabas Chahuán, lawyer, National Prosecutor of Public Ministry (2007–2015)
- José Zalaquett, lawyer, renowned for his work in the defence of human rights during the de facto regime that governed Chile under Augusto Pinochet from 1973 to 1990

=== Musicians and singers ===
- Luis Dimas, singer, member of Nueva ola and temporary actor
- Elyanna, singer-songwriter
- Nicolas Jaar, composer and musician
- Daniela Shejade, singer-songwriter

=== Politics ===
- Sergio Bitar, economist, senator (1994–2002), Minister of Mining (1973), Education (2003–2005) and Public Works (2008–2010)
- Jorge Cauas, economist, Minister of Finance (1974–1976), Ambassador of Chile to the United States (1977–1978)
- Francisco Chahuán, lawyer, deputy (2006–2010), senator (2010–2026) and Ambassador of Chile to Mexico since 2026.
- May Chomalí, doctor, Ministry of Health (since 2026)
- Rodrigo Delgado, psychologist, Mayor of Estación Central (2008–2020), Minister of Interior and Public Security (2020–2022)
- Yamil Ethit, lawyer, Governor of Colchagua Province (2018–2020), Regional Councilor of O'Higgins (2022–2023), Mayor of Santa Cruz (since 2024)
- Gustavo Hasbún, journalist, Mayor of Estación Central (2000–2008), deputy (2010–2018),
- Daniel Jadue, architect, sociologist, Mayor of Recoleta (2012–2024)
- Fares Jadue, public administrator, Mayor of Recoleta (since 2024)
- Liliana Jadue, doctor, Undersecretary of Public Health (2010–2011)
- Issa Kort, lawyer, deputy (2011–2021), Ambassador of Chile to the Organization of American States (2021–2022), Ambassador of Chile to Brazil (since 2026)
- Pablo Milad, PE teacher and businessman, Intendant of the Maule Region (2018–2020)
- Juan Carlos Muñoz, civil engineer, Minister of Transportation and Telecommunications (2022–2026)
- Omar Sabat, forest engineer, Mayor of Valdivia (2012–021), deputy (since 2026)
- Marco Antonio Salum, deputy (1949–1957)
- Jorge Tarud, deputy (2002–2018), Ambassador of Chile to Saudi Arabia (1990–994), to Australia (1994–2000), to China (2000–2001) and Belgium (since 2026)
- Rafael Tarud, lawyer, Minister of Mining, Economy and Commerce and Foreign Affairs (1953), senator (1957–1973)
- Mónica Zalaquett, entrepreneur, deputy (2010–2014), Minister of Women and Gender Equality (2020–022)
- Pablo Zalaquett, business administrator, Mayor of La Florida (2000–2008) and Santiago (2008–2012)
- Sergio Zarzar, PE teacher, Mayor of Chillán (2008–2021)

=== Religion ===
- Fernando Chomali, Archbishop of Santiago de Chile since 2023
- Raúl Hasbún, catholic priest, former TV presenter

=== Sports ===
==== Men's football ====
- Edgardo Abdala, Palestine international footballer (2003–2008) and manager
- Joaquín Abdala, Palestine international footballer (2022)
- Nicolás Abumohor, President of Palestino (1960–1965), President of Asociación Central de Fútbol de Chile (1969–1972) and a member of FIFA executive committee
- Ricardo Abumohor, President of ANFP (1993–1998) and owner of O'Higgins (2005–2025)
- Patricio Acevedo, Palestine international footballer (2006)
- Lucas Assadi, Chile international footballer (since 2022)
- Francisco Alam, Palestine international footballer (2002–2006)
- Roberto Bishara, Palestine international footballer (2000–2011) and manager
- Jonathan Cantillana, Palestine international footballer (2015–2024)
- Christian Durán, Palestine international footballer (2003)
- Marco Fajre, footballer and manager
- Rodrigo Gattas, Chile under-20 international footballer (2011)
- Daúd Gazale, Chile international footballer (2008–2011)
- Nicola Hadwa, manager of Palestine national team (2002–2004)
- Ignacio Hasbún, Chile under-17 international footballer (2007)
- Yashir Islame, Palestine international footballer (2016–2019) and Chile under-20 international (2009–2011)
- Matías Jadue, Palestine international footballer (2015–2017), Chile under-17 international footballer (2009) and sport manager
- Sergio Jadue, President of ANFP (2011–2015) and President of Competitions of CONMEBOL (2014–2015)
- Roberto Kettlun, Palestine international footballer (2002–2012)
- Hernán Madrid, Palestine international footballer (2004)
- Felipe Massri, Palestine international footballer (2025)
- Constantino Mohor, Chile international footballer (1958–1960) and manager
- Nelson Mores, footballer and manager of Palestine national team (2007)
- Luis Musrri, Chile international footballer (1991–1998) and manager
- Néstor Narbona, Palestine international footballer (2003)
- Miguel Nasur, footballer, President of Palestino (1977–1978), President of ANFP (1985–1986), owner of Santiago Morning (since 2005), Deportes Ovalle (2013–2025) and Miami United (2016–2024)
- Alexis Norambuena, Palestine international footballer (2012–2019)
- Bruno Pesce, Palestine international footballer (2004–2006)
- Marcos Riffo, Palestine international footballer (2003)
- Arturo Salah, footballer, manager of Chile national team (1990–1993)
- Camilo Saldaña, Palestine international footballer (2023–024) and Chile under-20 international footballer (2018)
- Pablo Tamburrini, Palestine international footballer (2015–2018)
- Leonardo Zamora, Palestine international footballer (2003–004)
- Nicolás Zedán, Palestine international footballer (2022) and Chile under-20 international footballer (2018–2019)

==== Women's football ====
- Florencia Saavedra, Palestine international footballer (since 2024) and Chile under-20 international footballer (2023)
- Rania Sansur, Palestine international footballer (since 2025)

==== Other sports ====
- Jorge Atalah, skeet shooter who won the silver medal at the 2004 ISSF World Cup and the 2022 South American Games
- Nicolás Atalah, skeet shooter who represented Chile at the 1968 Summer Olympics
- Nicolás Massú, tennis player and coach, winner of singles and doubles gold medals at the 2004 Athens Olympics
- Pablo Milad, athlete and basketball player, South American champion in shot put, master champion in combined track and field in 2014, also President of Curicó Unido (2014–2020) and President of ANFP (2020–2027)
- Jorge Antonio Salhe, shooter who represented Palestine at the 2024 Summer Olympics
- Jorge Uauy, skeet shooter who represented Chile at the 1972 Summer Olympics

=== Other ===
- Soledad Saieh, film producer and cultural manager
- Juan Yarur, collector of contemporary art, founder of the Santiago based non-profit AMA Foundation

== See also ==
- Palestinians
- Palestinian diaspora
- List of Palestinians
- List of Palestinian artists
- Palestinians in Chile
