= List of Palestine international footballers born outside Palestine =

Palestine national football team badge since 2023

The Palestine national football team has used footballers born outside Palestine throughout its history with varying success.

== Players ==
This is a list of football players who represented the Palestine national football team in international football since 1952 and were born outside Palestine.

Players who represented the Mandatory Palestine national team (1934–1940) are indicated below this list since it was made up by Jewish players despite the fact that FIFA required it represented the entire population of Palestine.

The following players:

1. have played at least one game for the full (senior male) Palestine national team since 1952; and
2. were born outside Palestine.

This list includes players who have dual citizenship with Palestine and/or have become naturalised Palestinian citizens. The players are ordered per modern-day country of birth; if the country at the time of birth differs from the current, this is indicated with a footnote.

Key
§	Still active for the active for the national team (Note: Players who are still active for the national team are players who haven't retired from international football and are, subsequently, eligible to be called up.)

List of players
Country of birth	Player	Caps	Goals	Period
Argentina	Pablo Abdala	19	0	2002–2006
Argentina	Agustín Manzur§	7	0	2025–
Argentina	Daniel Mustafá	6	0	2012–2018
Argentina	Alejandro Naif	8	0	2003–2004
Argentina	Carlos Salom	1	1	2016
Argentina	Gianni Touma§	2	0	2026–
Chile	Edgardo Abdala	19	1	2003–2008
Chile	Joaquín Abdala§	2	0	2022
Chile	Patricio Acevedo	2	0	2006
Chile	Francisco Atura	24	4	2002–2006
Chile	Christian Badillo	1	0	2003
Chile	Roberto Bishara	22	0	2000–2011
Chile	Jonathan Cantillana§	36	10	2015–2024
Chile	Yashir Islame§	20	7	2016–2019
Chile	Matías Jadue	7	1	2015–2017
Chile	Roberto Kettlun	23	3	2002–2012
Chile	Hernán Madrid	1	0	2004
Chile	Felipe Massri§	1	0	2025–
Chile	Néstor Narbona	6	0	2003
Chile	Alexis Norambuena	22	1	2012–2019
Chile	Bruno Pesce	5	0	2004–2006
Chile	Marcos Riffo	1	0	2003
Chile	Camilo Saldaña§	15	0	2023–2024
Chile	Pablo Tamburrini§	21	1	2015–2018
Chile	Leonardo Zamora	7	0	2003–2004
Chile	Nicolás Zedán§	2	0	2022
Croatia	Muhamed Alghoul§	1	0	2025–
Denmark	Wessam Abou Ali§	11	4	2024–
Denmark	Adam Ahmad§	1	0	2026–
Denmark	Hani Naboulse	3	0	2012
Egypt	Mohamed Barakat	2	0	2013
Egypt	Ramzi Saleh	68	0	2000–2015
Egypt	Mohammed Samara	12	0	2011–2013
France	Mohammed Ali Shatrit	1	0	2011
Germany	Ali Abu Alfa§	2	0	2023
Germany	Khalid Abu El Haija§	7	0	2025–
Germany	Saleh Chihadeh§	15	2	2018–2023
Germany	Dawoud Iraqi§	3	0	2020
Israel	Atef Abu Bilal§	11	0	2010–2013
Israel	Mohammed Abu Khamis	2	0	2015–2017
Israel	Ahmad Abu Nahyeh	9	6	2015–2017
Israel	Mohammed Abu Raas§	1	0	2018
Israel	Ala'a Abu Saleh	3	0	2016
Israel	Hussam Abu Saleh	55	4	2010–2015
Israel	Mosab Abusalem§	1	0	2020
Israel	Muamen Agbaria§	2	0	2016
Israel	Mahmoud Al-Iwisat§	2	0	2018
Israel	Abdullah Al-Saidawi	14	0	2004–2011
Israel	Ahmad Alan	2	0	2009
Israel	Shadi Allan	1	0	2011
Israel	Murad Alyan	9	7	2011
Israel	Fayez Aslieh§	3	0	2013
Israel	Ahmed Awad§	4	1	2016–2018
Israel	Reebal Dahamshi§	6	0	2020–2021
Israel	Mohammed Darweesh§	49	0	2015–2024
Israel	Mohamed Darwish§	5	0	2020–2021
Israel	Haytham Dheeb	36	2	2010–2018
Israel	Ali El-Khatib	6	2	2011
Israel	Rami Hamadeh§	67	0	2013–
Israel	Ahmed Harbi	27	1	2010–2015
Israel	Alaa Aldeen Hassan§	9	1	2023–
Israel	Abdallah Jaber§	59	2	2014–2019
Israel	Ataa Jaber§	14	0	2023–2025
Israel	Mohammed Jebreen	13	1	2010–2012
Israel	Samer Jondi§	12	0	2022–2024
Israel	Abdelrahim Kabeia	2	0	2013
Israel	Haitham Khairallah§	2	0	2019
Israel	Ameed Mahajna§	21	1	2023–
Israel	Ghanem Mahajna§	1	0	2017
Israel	Hilal Musa	10	0	2014–2018
Israel	Mohammad Natour§	3	1	2017–2018
Israel	Abd Al-Salem Salama§	1	0	2021
Israel	Fadi Salbees	5	0	2015–2018
Israel	Mohammed Samar§	1	0	2021
Israel	Osama Sha'aban§	2	0	2016
Israel	Shadi Shaban	24	0	2016–2019
Israel	Ayham Shhade§	3	0	2026–
Israel	Ahmed Taha§	11	0	2025–
Israel	Mohammed Yameen§	39	3	2016–2023
Israel	Abbed Yassin§	2	0	2025–
Israel	Mahmoud Yousef§	2	2	2017
Israel	Fadi Zidan§	2	0	2021
Jordan	Jamal Al-Houli	14	1	2000–2006
Jordan	Shareef Adnan	3	0	2009
Jordan	Gebran Kahla	2	0	1999–2000
Kuwait	Majed Abu Sidu	21	0	2004–2011
Kuwait	Mohammed Al-Masri	7	0	2011
Kuwait	Samer Hijazi	10	0	2009–2013
Kuwait	Omar Jarun	15	0	2007–2014
Kuwait	Hussein Jawhar	1	0	2009
Lebanon	Wasim Abdalhadi	2	0	2004
Lebanon	Jamal Al-Khatib	2	0	1973
Lebanon	Ibrahim Al-Manasri	14	3	1998–2001
Lebanon	Rami Assaad	2	0	2004
Lebanon	Mohamad Hebous§	1	0	2025–
Lebanon	Hamza Hussein§	1	0	2025–
Lebanon	Abdelhadi Rashid§	2	0	2026–
Libya	Mohammed Qasem§	1	0	2013
Paraguay	Javier Cohene	1	1	2014
Peru	Emilio Saba§	3	0	2025–
Saudi Arabia	Ismail Al-Amour	45	7	2005–2015
Saudi Arabia	Fadi Lafi	33	4	1999–2009
Slovenia (then Yugoslavia)	Jaka Ihbeisheh	17	3	2014–2016
Spain	Yaser Hamed§	34	5	2019–
Sweden	Assad Al Hamlawi§	6	5	2025–
Sweden	Mahmoud Eid§	26	1	2014–2025
Sweden	Omar Faraj§	6	0	2024–
Sweden	Amr Kaddoura§	5	0	2021–2024
Sweden	Adam Kaied§	8	0	2025–
Sweden	Samir Maarouf§	1	0	2023
Sweden	Milad Termanini§	35	2	2018–
Sweden	Imad Zatara	28	3	2004–2015
Sweden	Moustafa Zeidan§	9	0	2018–
Syria	Amer Al-Abtah	3	0	2004–2008
Syria	Ibrahim Al-Maghrebi	?	?	1965–1966
Syria	Ali Ismail	1	1	1992
Syria	Omar Khalil	9	0	2003–2006
United States	Nazmi Albadawi	9	1	2018–2019
United States	Ahmad Al-Qaq§	8	1	2025–
United States	Ali Elkadi	1	0	2012
United States	Morad Fareed	1	0	2004
Venezuela	Brayan Dakhil§	1	0	2026–

== Countries ==
List of countries
Country of birth	Total	Most-capped player (caps)
Israel	44	Rami Hamadeh (67)
Chile	20	Jonathan Cantillana (36)
Sweden	9	Milad Termanini (35)
Lebanon	7	Ibrahim Al-Manasri (14)
Argentina	6	Pablo Abdala (19)
Kuwait	5	Majed Abu Sidu (21)
Germany	4	Saleh Chihadeh (15)
Syria	4	Omar Khalil (9)
United States	4	Nazmi Albadawi (9)
Denmark	3	Wessam Abou Ali (11)
Egypt	3	Ramzi Saleh (68)
Jordan	3	Jamal Al-Houli (14)
Saudi Arabia	2	Ismail Al-Amour (45)
Croatia	1	Muhamed Alghoul (1)
France	1	Mohammed Ali Shatrit (1)
Libya	1	Mohammed Qasem (1)
Paraguay	1	Javier Cohene (1)
Peru	1	Emilio Saba (3)
Slovenia	1	Jaka Ihbeisheh (17)
Spain	1	Yaser Hamed (34)
Venezuela	1	Brayan Dakhil (1)

== B-team ==
The following players have represented the Palestine B-team or reserve team.

List of players
Country of birth	Player	Period
Brazil	Diogo Samara	2026
Chile	Martín Aras	2026
Chile	Machur Yunes	2026
Germany	Bakir Mahmoud	2026
Jordan	Omar Hasanain	2026
Norway	Hamza Fahid Sobhieh	2026
Saudi Arabia	Mohammad Zoghayyer	2026
United Arab Emirates	Musab Mubarak	2026
United States	Tamer Ibsais	2026

== Mandatory Palestine ==
List of players
Country of birth	Player	Caps	Goals	Period
Belarus (then Russian Republic)	Natan Panz	1	0	1938
Greece	Avraham Beit haLevi	2	0	1938
Hungary (then Austria-Hungary)	Julius Klein	1	0	1938
Hungary (then Austria-Hungary)	Peri Neufeld	2	1	1938
Hungary (then Austria-Hungary)	Yona Stern	1	0	1938
Israel	Willy Berger	2	0	1934
Israel	Shuka Brashedski	1	0	1938
Israel	Yaacov Breir	1	0	1940
Israel	Lonia Dvorin	1	0	1940
Israel	Zvi Erlich	1	0	1940
Israel	Pinhas Fiedler	2	0	1934
Israel	Zalman Friedmann	3	0	1934–1940
Israel	Amnon Harlap	2	0	1934
Israel	Werner Kaspi	1	0	1940
Israel	Peri Kraus	1	0	1934
Israel	Yaacov Levi-Meir	1	0	1934
Israel	Yosef Liebermann	2	0	1938
Israel	Gaul Machlis	3	1	1938–1940
Israel	Herbert Meitner	1	1	1940
Israel	Menahem Mirmovich	2	0	1938
Israel	Binyamin Mizrahi	1	0	1940
Israel	Avraham Nudelman	3	1	1934–1938
Israel	Avner Protopopov	1	0	1938
Israel	Haim Reich	3	0	1934–1940
Israel	Avraham Reznik	2	0	1934–1938
Israel	Isaac Rosenbaum	1	0	1940
Israel	Naftali Schwalb	1	0	1940
Israel	Shalom Shalomzon	1	0	1940
Israel	Avraham Shneiderovich	1	1	1940
Israel	Yohanan Sukenik	3	1	1934–1938
Israel	David Weinberg	1	0	1934
Israel	Yaacov Zelibanski	1	0	1934
Poland (then Russian Empire)	Jerry Beit haLevi	1	0	1938
Poland (then Russian Empire)	Israël Elsner	1	0	1938
Poland (then Russian Empire)	Paul Kestenbaum	1	0	1934
Romania (then Kingdom of Romania)	Gedalyahu Fuchs	5	0	1934–1940
Ukraine (then Ukrainian People's Republic)	Mila Ginzburg	1	0	1938

== See also ==
- List of Palestine international footballers
- List of Palestine women's international footballers
