= Yarur =

Yarur is a surname. Notable people with the surname include:

- Juan Jorge Giha Yarur (born 1955), Chilean-born Peruvian sports shooter
- Jorge Yarur Banna (1918-1991), Chilean banker
- Juan Yarur Lolas (1894-1954), Chilean banker
- Luis Enrique Yarur Rey (born 1951), Chilean banker

== See also ==
- Yarur Palace, historic castle in Chile
