= ENB =

ENB may refer to:

- Earth Negotiations Bulletin, an online publication on sustainability
- Ecurie Nationale Belge, a Formula One constructor and sports car team
- Electromagnetic navigation bronchoscopy
- ENB Beyrouth, a Lebanese sports club
- Enb Consulting, a subsidiary of Moody's Analytics
- Enbridge, a Canadian oil and natural gas company
- English National Ballet, based in London, England
- eNodeB, a LTE base station
- Ethylidene norbornene
- Executive National Bank, an American financial institution
- First National Bank (South Africa) (Afrikaans: Eerste Nasionale Bank)
- Markweta language
