= Halid Alghoul =

Palestinian footballer (born 2002)

Personal information
- Date of birth: 8 September 2002 (age 24)
- Place of birth: Zagreb, Croatia
- Position: Forward

Team information
- Current team: Keflavík
- Number: 9

Youth career
- –2010: NK Nur Zagreb
- 2010–2012: NK Lokomotiva
- 2012–2021: GNK Dinamo Zagreb

Senior career*
Years	Team	Apps	(Gls)
2020–2021	GNK Dinamo Zagreb II	3	(0)
2021–2022	NK Kustošija	5	(0)
2022	NK Trnje	0	(0)
2022–2026	NK Jarun Zagreb	36	(10)
2026-	Keflavik	8	(0)

International career^{‡}
2022–2023	Palestine U23	6	(1)
- * Club domestic league appearances and goals as of 10 July 2026 ‡ National team caps and goals as of 05:21, 19 August 2024 (UTC)

Halid Alghoul (born 8 September 2002) is a Palestinian footballer who plays as a forward for Icelandic Besta Deild club Keflavík. Born in Croatia, he is a Palestine youth international.

== Club career ==
Alghoul mainly operates as a forward. As a youth player, he joined the youth academy of Croatian side NK Nur Zagreb. In 2010, he joined the youth academy of Croatian side NK Lokomotiva. In 2012, he joined the youth academy of Croatian side GNK Dinamo Zagreb. Alghoul started his senior career with Croatian side GNK Dinamo Zagreb II. In 2021, he signed for Croatian side NK Kustošija. In 2022, he signed for Croatian side NK Trnje. After that, he signed for Croatian side NK Jarun Zagreb.

== International career ==
Alghoul was a Croatia youth international. He was called up to the Croatia national under-19 football team. After that, he was a Palestine youth international. He played for the Palestine national under-23 football team. He scored his only goal for them against Tunisia.

== Personal life ==
Alghoul was born on 8 September 2002 in Zagreb, Croatia. He is a native of Zagreb, Croatia. He was born to a Palestinian father and Croatian-Bosniak mother. His father has worked as a traffic engineer. He has been a supporter of English Premier League side Manchester United. He is the brother of Palestine international Muhamed Alghoul.
