= List of Palestine international footballers =

Palestine national football team badge since 2023

The Palestine national football team represents Palestine in men's international football and is controlled by the Palestinian Football Association (PFA). It is nicknamed Al‑Fida'i (the Fedayeen) and the Lions of Canaan.

Under the British Mandate, Jewish sports leaders established the Palestine Football Association (PFA) in 1928. Initially, PFA participation included a few Arab clubs alongside Jewish teams, but its membership became virtually all Jewish by the mid-1930s. Concurrently, the Arab Palestinian Sports Federation (APSF) was formed in 1931 due to the PFA's neglect of Arab interests. The APSF fielded its own teams, playing its first match against the American University of Beirut that same year, before it was dissolved toward the end of the decade due to the 1936–1939 Arab revolt. Palestine's first international match played was an 8–1 away defeat to Egypt at the 1953 Pan Arab Games.

The team was admitted to FIFA in 1998, and has been a member of the Asian Football Confederation (AFC) since that year. Palestine played its first FIFA‑recognised match on 20 July 1998, a 3–1 friendly loss to Lebanon. The team has qualified for the AFC Asian Cup three times, in 2015, 2019 and 2023. As of October 2026, the player with the most caps is Mus'ab Al‑Batat, and the all‑time top scorer is Oday Dabbagh.

== Players ==
Key
§	Still active for the national team (Note: Players who are still active for the national team are players who have not retired from international football and are therefore eligible to be called up.)
GK	Goalkeeper
DF	Defender
MF	Midfielder
FW	Forward

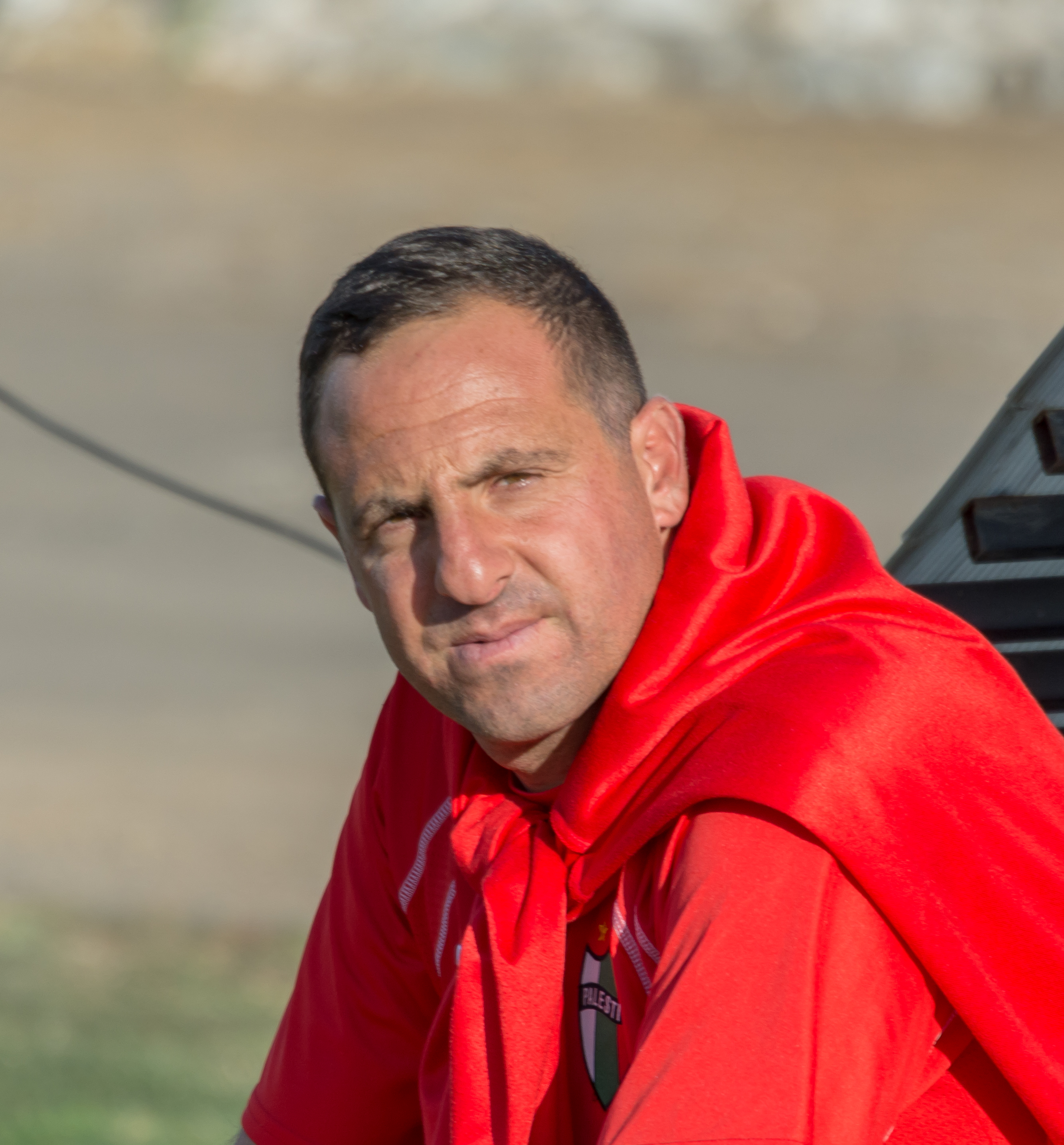
Roberto Bishara (27 caps, no goals) was one of the first Chilean-born players to represent Palestine.

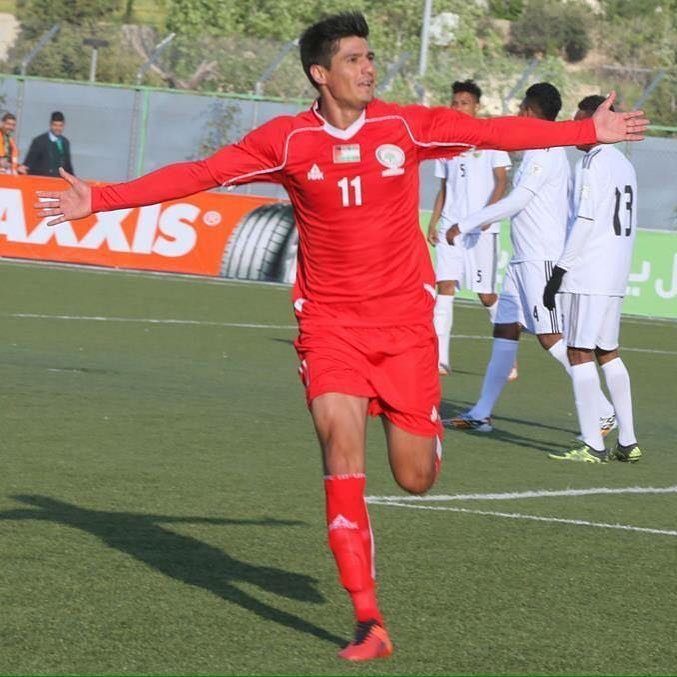
Yashir Islame (20 caps, 7 goals) was capped by Chile's under-20 side as Yashir Pinto before switching allegiance to Palestine.

Palestine national team football players with at least 20 appearances
Name	Position	National team career	Caps	Goals	Ref
Musab Al-Battat§	DF	2013–2026	84	1	
Abdelatif Bahdari	DF	2007–2021	82	9	
Tamer Seyam§	FW	2014–2026	79	15	
Khader Yousef	MF	2008–2016	72	2	
Rami Hamadeh§	GK	2017–2026	70	0	
Ramzi Saleh	GK	2000–2015	68	0	
Abdallah Jaber	DF	2014–2019	59	2	
Ashraf Nu'man	FW	2009–2016	58	16	
Oday Dabbagh§	FW	2018–2026	58	19	
Hussam Abu Saleh	DF	2010–2015	55	4	
Mohammed Rashid	MF	2018–2025	53	2	
Saeb Jendeya	DF	1997–2008	52	0	
Mohammed Darweesh	MF	2015–2024	50	0	
Oday Kharoub§	MF	2017–2025	50	1	
Ismail Al-Amour	MF	2005–2015	49	7	
Khaled Salem	FW	2011–2021	46	10	
Mahmoud Abu Warda§	FW	2019–2025	46	3	
Tawfiq Ali	GK	2011–2025	45	0	
Mohammed Saleh§	DF	2016–2026	44	0	
Sameh Maraaba	FW	2014–2023	43	12	
Fahed Attal	FW	2004–2012	42	15	
Murad Ismail	MF	2010–2015	42	2	
Mohammed Yameen	MF	2016–2023	40	3	
Abdelhamid Abuhabib	MF	2012–2018	39	9	
Mousa Abu-Jazar	DF	2011–2014	38	1	
Haytham Dheeb	DF	2010–2018	37	2	
Jonathan Cantillana	MF	2015–2024	36	10	
Milad Termanini§	DF	2018–2026	35	2	
Yaser Hamed§	DF	2019–2026	35	5	
Fadi Lafi	FW	1999–2009	35	5	
Islam Batran	MF	2016–2024	33	5	
Ibrahim Al-Suwairki	MF	1999–2007	33	2	
Hamada Eshbair	DF	2000–2008	33	0	
Raed Fares	DF	2011–2014	32	0	
Houssam Wadi	MF	2008–2013	30	3	
Ziyad Al-Kord	FW	1999–2006	29	10	
Ahmad Maher Wridat	MF	2011–2018	29	8	
Khaled Mahdi	DF	2008–2014	29	0	
Imad Zatara	MF	2004–2015	29	3	
Ahmed Harbi	DF	2010–2015	29	1	
Zaid Qunbar§	FW	2022–2026	27	4	
Taysir Amer	FW	2002–2008	27	3	
Roberto Bishara	DF	2000–2011	27	0	
Mahmoud Eid	FW	2014–2024	26	1	
Shadi Shaban	MF	2016–2019	26	0	
Ahmed Keshkesh	FW	2004–2011	25	5	
Francisco Atura	DF	2002–2006	25	3	
Ma'aly Kaware	MF	2008–2013	25	0	
Suleiman Obeid	MF	2007–2013	24	2	
Pablo Tamburrini	MF	2015–2019	24	1	
Alexis Norambuena	DF	2012–2019	23	1	
Iyad Abu Gharqoud	FW	2011–2013	22	3	
Roberto Kettlun	MF	2002–2012	21	3	
Majed Abu Sidu	DF	2004–2011	21	0	
Mahmoud Wadi	FW	2017–2024	21	0	
Tamer Salah	DF	2014–2018	21	0	
Ameed Mahajna§	DW	2023–2026	20	1	
Yashir Islame	FW	2016–2019	20	7	

== See also ==
- Football in Palestine
- List of Palestine international footballers born outside Palestine
