= Muhammad Al-Masri =

Muhammad Al-Masri (Arabic: محمد المصري), and similar variations, may refer to:

== People ==
- Mohamed Elmasry (born 1943), Canadian engineering professor and imam
- Mohammed Diab Ibrahim al-Masri, known as Mohammed Deif (1965–2024), Palestinian militant with Hamas
- Mohammed Al-Masri (born 1981), Palestinian footballer
- Mohammad Al Massri (born 2001), Lebanese footballer

== See also ==
- Mohammad al-Massari (born 1946), Saudi Arabian physicist and dissident
