= Marina Rosenberg =

Israeli diplomat

- מרינה רוזנברג
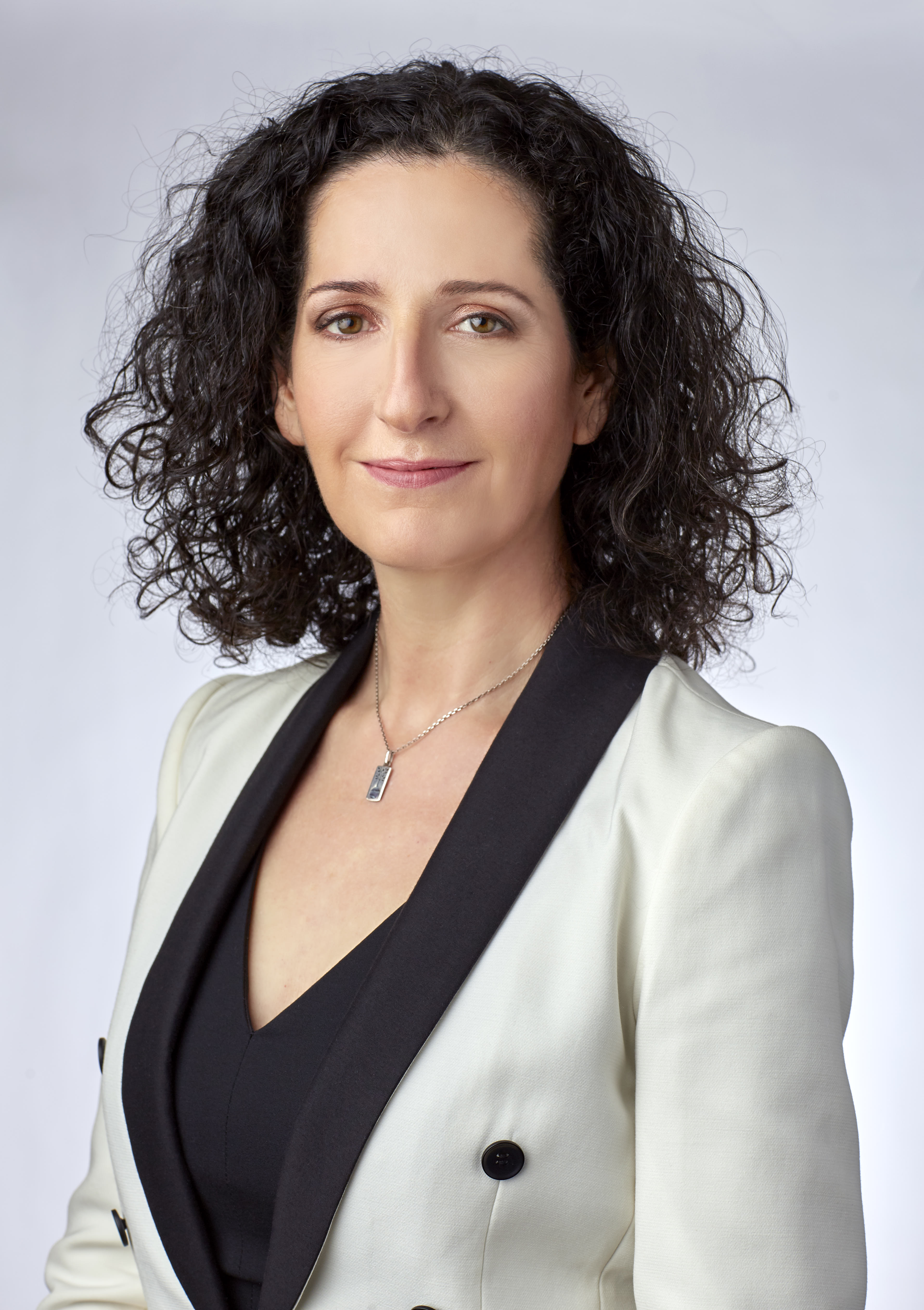

Israeli Ambassador to Chile
- In office July 2019 – 2022
- Preceded by: Eldad Hayet

Personal details
- Born: 1976; Buenos Aires, Argentina
- Children: 2
- Education: Hebrew University of Jerusalem (BA); Tel Aviv University (MA)

Marina Rosenberg (Hebrew: מרינה רוזנברג; born 1976) is an Israeli diplomat who served as the Israeli Ambassador to Chile. She was born in Buenos Aires, Argentina, and immigrated to Israel where she was educated at the Hebrew University of Jerusalem and Tel Aviv University. She joined the Ministry of Foreign Affairs in 2006 and served in multiple diplomatic roles before being appointed as the ambassador to Chile.

== Early life ==
Marina Rosenberg was born in 1976, in Buenos Aires, Argentina, and later immigrated to Israel when she was six years old. Rosenberg graduated from the Hebrew University of Jerusalem with a Bachelor of Arts in political science and Latin-American studies, and graduated from Tel Aviv University with a Master of Arts in diplomacy and security studies. She married and had two children with her husband.

Rosenberg has Argentine, German, and Israeli citizenship.

== Career ==
Rosenberg became a member of the Israeli Ministry of Foreign Affairs in 2006 and successfully completed the ministry's cadets course in October of the same year. Between 2009 and 2012, she assumed the role of acting Deputy Director at the UN Specialized Agencies and International Organizations Department. From August 2014 to 2017, Rosenberg held the position of Counselor for Foreign Affairs at the Israeli embassy in Berlin. Additionally, she has contributed as the Special Regional Adviser to the Director-General, overseeing political affairs in the Gulf region, at the Director-General's Bureau in Jerusalem.

In July 2019, Rosenberg was appointed to serve as the Israeli Ambassador to Chile. After serving as ambassador she became senior vice president of international affairs at the Anti-Defamation League.
