= Executive National Bank =

Former American financial institution in Florida

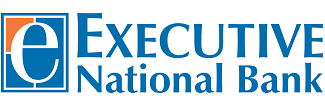
- Type: Private company
- Industry: Financial services
- Founded: (1972) as Jefferson National Bank
- Defunct: 2019
- Fate: Acquired
- Successor: City National Bank of Florida
- Headquarters: Miami, Florida, United States of America
- Area served: Miami-Dade County
- Key people: Carlos A. Safie (Chairman and CEO)
- Products: Consumer Banking, corporate Banking, investment banking, investment management, private equity, loans, mortgages, and credit cards
- Number of employees: 100 approx. (2009)
- Website: www.executivebank.com

i

Executive National Bank was an American bank headquartered in the Miami, Florida that was acquired by City National Bank of Florida in 2019. When the acquisition was announced, the bank had three banking centers in Miami-Dade County and assets of about $455 million.

Executive National Bank has been a member of the CDARS network.

== Corporate history ==
The bank was founded as Jefferson National Bank, charter number 15974, in 1972. In 1981, it was acquired by the Safie family and renamed Executive National Bank. It was wholly owned by the Executive Banking Corporation, a one bank holding company, which had maintained continuous control of the bank with Carlos Safie as president and CEO.

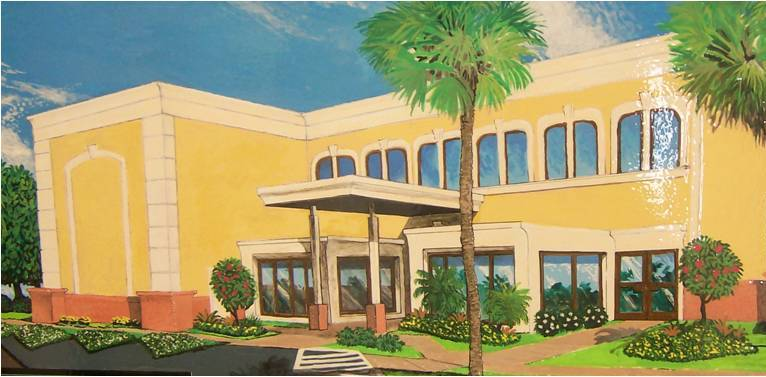
Rendering of headquarters and original branch in Kendall, a suburb of Miami

In 2019 the bank was acquired by City National Bank of Florida and its branches rebranded as City National Bank. City National is owned by Chilean bank Banco de Crédito e Inversiones (BCI).
