= Amador Yarur =

Chilean businessman of Palestinian origin

Amador Yarur Banna
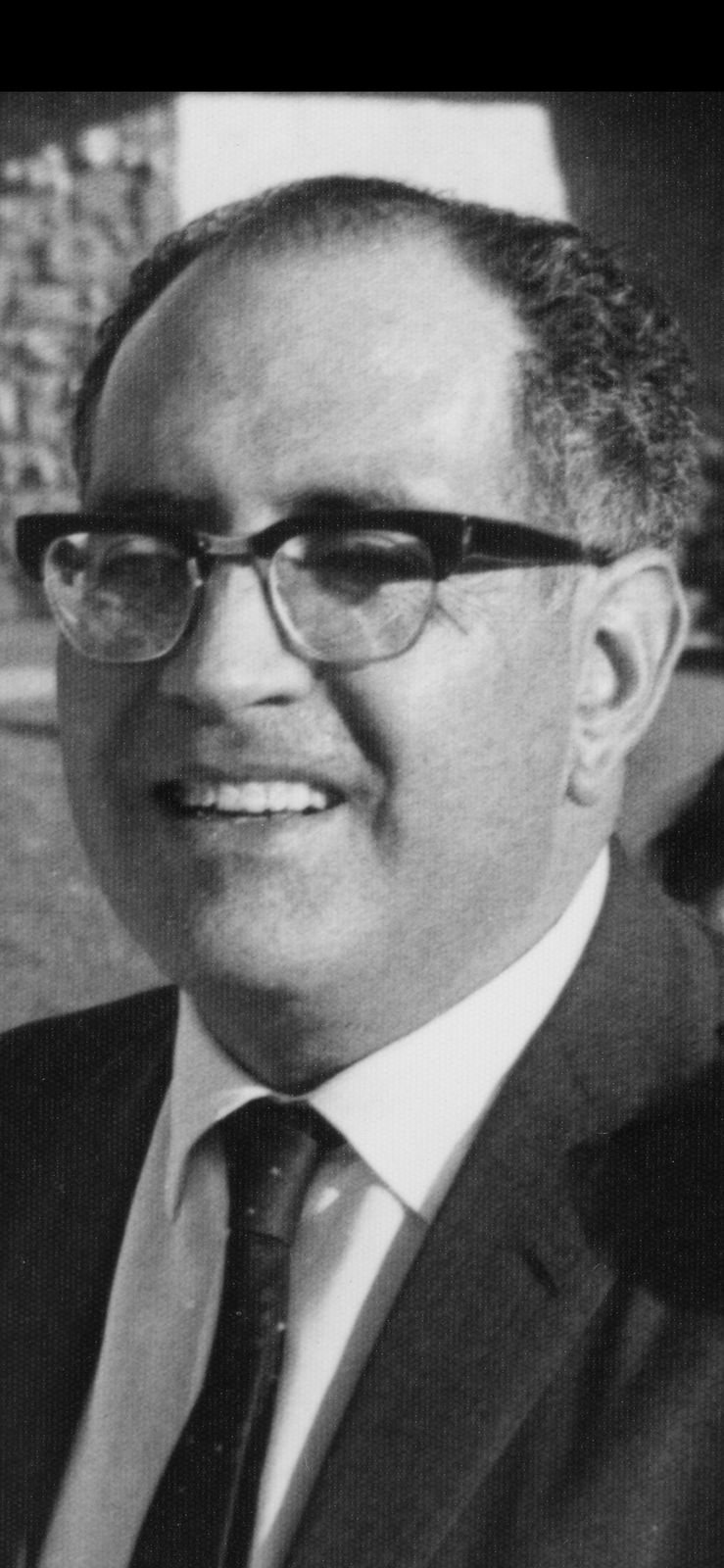
- Born: Amador Yarur Banna; 1920; Arequipa
- Died: 2006 (aged 85–86); Santiago
- Occupation: Businessperson
- Relatives: Juan Yarur (son)

Amador Yarur Banna (November 26, 1920 – 2006) was a Chilean businessman of Palestinian origin. He was president of Textile Yarur and the first president of Club Deportivo Palestino.

== Biography ==
Amador Yarur Banna was born in Arequipa, Peru on November 26, 1920. He studied at the French School in Santiago.

Born to Palestinian immigrants Juan Yarur Lolas and Olombí Banna Alak, he was the youngest of three brothers: Carlos, Jorge, and Amador.

After the death of his father Juan Yarur Lolas, Amador and his brother Jorge assumed control of their family business, Textile Yarur and the Banco de Crédito e Inversiones bank. The textile company was initially named Yarur Hermanos but later changed its name to Machasa.

The Yarur family was a prominent business name in Chile, and in the early 1970s, Amador Yarur was the owner of the Yarur Textile mill. In 1971, the Salvador Allende government nationalized Yarur Textile mill and other businesses, instituting workers' control as part of its socialist reforms following a strike by the workers. In 1972, Yarur left Chile and settled in Quito, where he founded Amazonas Bank.

Following the 1973 Chilean coup and Augusto Pinochet's takeover, the Yarur Textile mill was returned to the Yarur family. In 1976, Amador Yarur returned to Chile once the political situation was stabilized, but the financial position of his company had severely deteriorated during Pinochet's military dictatorship, and despite his attempts, he was unable to revive it.

Yarur served as the president of the Club Deportivo Palestino, and in recognition of his contributions, the Palestino Stadium established the Amador Yarur Award for the best sports journalist, which is awarded annually. He was also president of President Balmaceda Radio, a radio station in Chile. Yarur died in 2006 in Santiago, Chile.
