= Bronchoscopy =

Procedure allowing a physician to look at a patient's airways

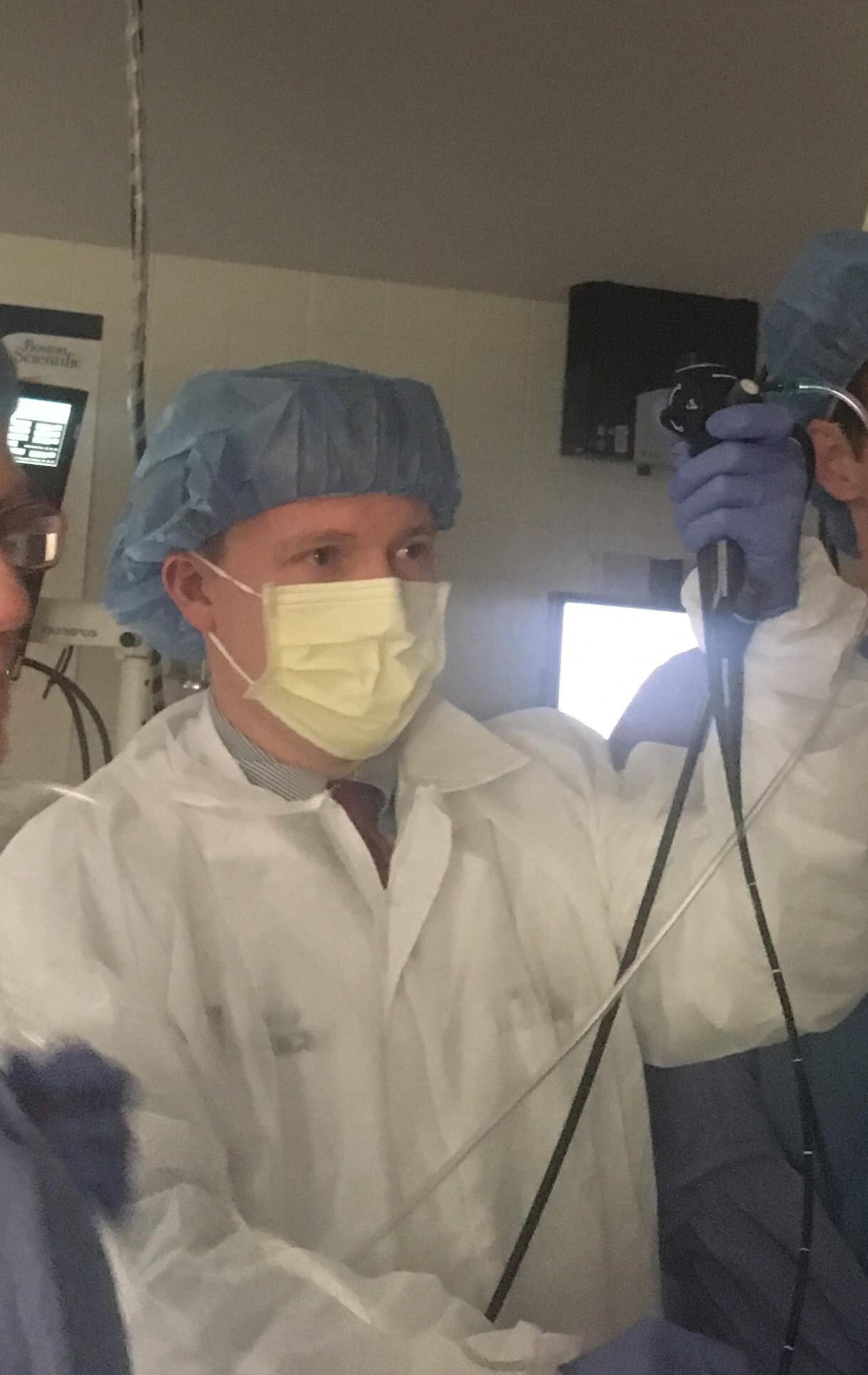
- A physician performing bronchoscopy.
- ICD-9-CM: 33.21-33.23
- MeSH: D001999
- OPS-301 code: 1-62
- MedlinePlus: 003857

Bronchoscopy is an endoscopic technique of visualizing the inside of the airways for diagnostic and therapeutic purposes. An instrument (bronchoscope) is inserted into the airways, usually through the nose or mouth, or occasionally through a tracheostomy. This allows the practitioner to examine the patient's airways for abnormalities such as foreign bodies, bleeding, tumors, or inflammation. Specimens may be taken from inside the lungs. The construction of bronchoscopes ranges from rigid metal tubes with attached lighting devices to flexible optical fiber instruments with realtime video equipment.

== History ==
The German laryngologist Gustav Killian is attributed with performing the first bronchoscopy in 1897. Killian used a rigid bronchoscope to remove a pork bone. The procedure was done in an awake patient using topical cocaine as a local anesthetic. From this time until the 1970s, rigid bronchoscopes were used exclusively.

Chevalier Jackson refined the rigid bronchoscope in the 1920s, using this rigid tube to visually inspect the trachea and mainstem bronchi. The British laryngologist Victor Negus, who worked with Jackson, improved the design of his endoscopes, including what came to be called the "Negus bronchoscope".

Shigeto Ikeda invented the flexible bronchoscope in 1966. The flexible scope initially employed fiberoptic bundles requiring an external light source for illumination. These scopes had outside diameters of approximately 5 mm to 6 mm, with an ability to flex 180 degrees and to extend 120 degrees, allowing entry into lobar and segmental bronchi. Fiberoptic scopes have been superseded by bronchoscopes with a charge-coupled device (CCD) video chip located at their distal end.

== Types ==
=== Rigid ===
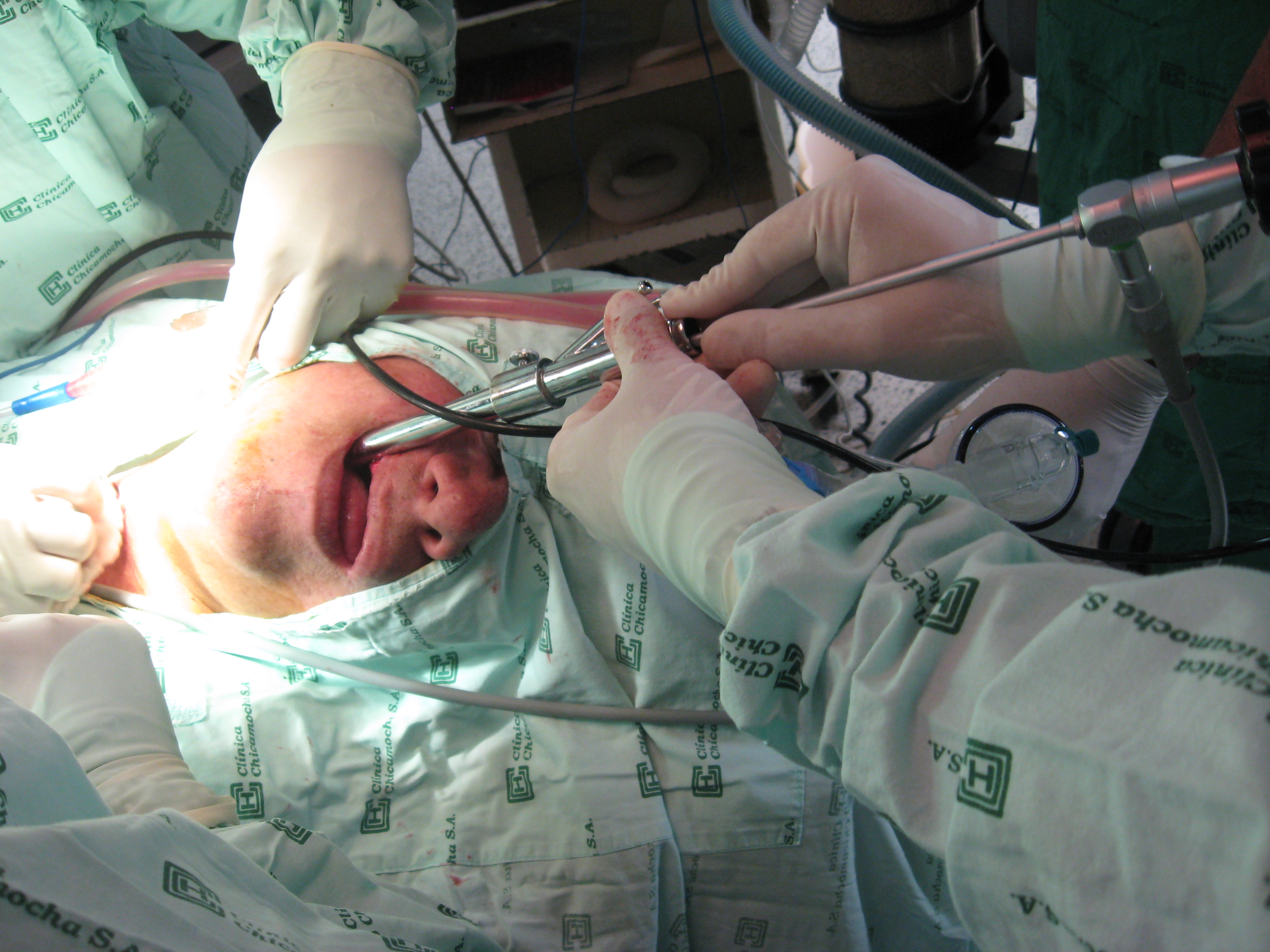
Rigid bronchoscopy.

The rigid bronchoscope is a hollow metal tube used for inspecting the lower airway. It can be for either diagnostic or therapeutic reasons. Modern use is almost exclusively for therapeutic indications. Rigid bronchoscopy is used for retrieving foreign objects. Rigid bronchoscopy is useful for recovering inhaled foreign bodies because it allows for protection of the airway and controlling the foreign body during recovery.

Massive hemoptysis, defined as loss of over 600 mL of blood in 24 hours, is a medical emergency and should be addressed with initiation of intravenous fluids and examination with rigid bronchoscopy. The larger lumen of the rigid bronchoscope (versus the narrow lumen of the flexible bronchoscope) allows for therapeutic approaches such as electrocautery to help control the bleeding.

=== Flexible (fiberoptic) ===
A flexible bronchoscope is longer and thinner than a rigid bronchoscope. It contains a fiberoptic system that transmits an image from the tip of the instrument to an eyepiece or video camera at the opposite end. Using Bowden cables connected to a lever at the hand piece, the tip of the instrument can be oriented, allowing the practitioner to navigate the instrument into individual lobar or segmental bronchi. Most flexible bronchoscopes also include a channel for suctioning or instrumentation, but these are significantly smaller than those in a rigid bronchoscope.

Flexible bronchoscopy causes less discomfort for the patient than rigid bronchoscopy, and the procedure can be performed easily and safely under moderate sedation. It is the technique of choice nowadays for most bronchoscopic procedures.

== Indications ==
Flexible bronchoscopy plays an important role in the diagnosis, monitoring and therapy of certain pulmonary diseases.

=== Diagnostic ===
Diagram of a bronchoscopy being performed

- To view abnormalities of the airway
- To obtain tissue specimens of the inside the lungs by biopsy, bronchoalveolar lavage, or endobronchial brushing.
- To evaluate a person who has bleeding in the lungs, possible lung cancer, a chronic cough, or sarcoidosis

=== Therapeutic ===
- To remove secretions, blood, or foreign objects lodged in the airway
- Laser resection of tumors or benign tracheal and bronchial strictures
- Stent insertion to palliate extrinsic compression of the tracheobronchial lumen from either malignant or benign disease processes
- For percutaneous tracheostomy
- Tracheal intubation of patients with difficult airways is often performed using a flexible bronchoscope

Interventional bronchoscopy in chronic obstructive airway inflammatory diseases including asthma and COPD has greatly evolved and show promising results for the clinical management of patients.

== Procedure ==
Video of a bronchoscopy of the right bronchial tree

Bronchoscopy can be performed in a special room designated for such procedures, operating room, intensive care unit, or other location with resources for the management of airway emergencies.

The patient will often be given antianxiety and antisecretory medications (to prevent oral secretions from obstructing the view), generally atropine, and sometimes an analgesic such as morphine. During the procedure, sedatives such as midazolam or propofol may be used. A local anesthetic is often given to anesthetize the mucous membranes of the pharynx, larynx, and trachea. The patient is monitored during the procedure with periodic blood pressure checks, continuous ECG monitoring of the heart, and pulse oximetry.

A flexible bronchoscope is inserted with the patient in a sitting or supine position. Once the bronchoscope is inserted into the upper airway, the vocal cords are inspected. The instrument is advanced to the trachea and further down into the bronchial system and each area is inspected as the bronchoscope passes.

If an abnormality is discovered, it may be sampled using a brush, a needle, or forceps. Specimen of lung tissue (transbronchial biopsy) may be sampled using a real-time X-ray (fluoroscopy) or an electromagnetic tracking system. Flexible bronchoscopy can also be performed on intubated patients, such as patients in intensive care. In this case, the instrument is inserted through an adapter connected to the tracheal tube.

Rigid bronchoscopy is performed under general anesthesia. Rigid bronchoscopes are too large to allow parallel placement of other devices in the trachea; therefore the anesthesia apparatus is connected to the bronchoscope and the patient is ventilated through the bronchoscope.

== Recovery ==
Although most patients tolerate bronchoscopy well, a brief period of observation is required after the procedure. Most complications occur early and are readily apparent at the time of the procedure. The patient is assessed for respiratory difficulty (stridor and dyspnea resulting from laryngeal edema, laryngospasm, or bronchospasm). Monitoring continues until the effects of sedative drugs wear off and gag reflex has returned. If the patient has had a transbronchial biopsy, doctors may take a chest X-ray to rule out any air leakage in the lungs (pneumothorax) after the procedure. The patient may need to be hospitalized if any bleeding, pneumothorax, or respiratory distress occurs.

== Bronchoscopy in critical care ==
Bronchoscopy has an important role to play in the management of critically ill patients in the Intensive care unit. Fibreoptic bronchoscopy can be applied via an endotracheal tube or tracheotomy in mechanically ventilated patients, or via the native airway in those not requiring ventilation. Indications for bronchoscopy in critically ill patients can be broadly divided into diagnostic and therapeutic categories.

=== Diagnostic indications ===
- Obtaining targeted deep respiratory samples by bronchoalveolar lavage or protected specimen brush for the diagnosis or exclusion of pneumonia
- Evaluation of alveolar cytopathology to identify inflammatory conditions or Alveolar haemorrhage
- Direct inspection of the tracheal muscoa for pulmonary aspergillosis or similar invasive mould infections
- Examination for evidence of airway burns and soot deposition following smoke inhalation
- Examination for endobronchial lesions such as tumours and foreign bodies

=== Therapeutic indications ===
- Removal of obstructing secretions to improve atelectasia
- Control of bleeding from defined bleeding points (ineffective for diffuse alveolar haemorrhage)
- Retrieval of foreign bodies
- Placement of bronchial blocker or endobronchial valves to control bronchopleural fistulas or air leaks.

The role of diagnostic bronchoscopy for the identification of pneumonia remains controversial with differing recommendations from learned bodies including the British Thoracic Society, American Thoracic Society/Infectious Disease Society of America, and European Society of Intensive Care Medicine/European Respiratory Society/European Society of Clinical Microbiology and Infectious Diseases/ Asociación Latinoamericana del Tórax. Although it is accepted that bronchoscopic diagnostic approaches have a lower false positive rate, the effect on patient outcomes is uncertain although there is clear evidence of the ability to safely reduce antibiotic use through this lower false positive rate.

== Complications and risks ==
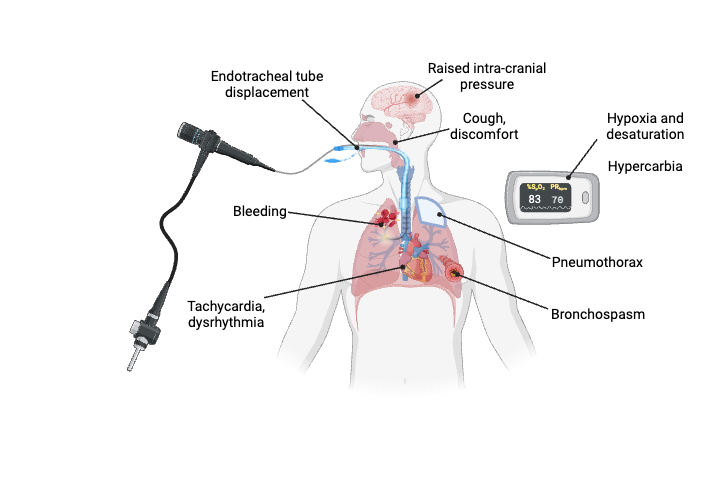
Figure showing complications of bronchoscopy, from

Besides the risks associated with the drugs used, there are also specific risks of the procedure. Although a rigid bronchoscope can scratch or tear airways or damage the vocal cords, the risk of bronchoscopy is limited in otherwise well patients. Complications are more frequent in critically ill patients in intensive care. The risk of complications from fiberoptic bronchoscopy are minimized with good training, careful technique and an ongoing dialogue with the anesthesiologist or sedationist. Common complications include excessive bleeding following biopsy. A lung biopsy also may cause leakage of air, called pneumothorax. Pneumothorax occurs in less than 1% of lung biopsy cases. Laryngospasm is a rare complication but may sometimes require tracheal intubation. Patients with tumors or significant bleeding may experience increased difficulty breathing after a bronchoscopic procedure, sometimes due to swelling of the mucous membranes of the airways. Other complications include arrhythmias, bronchospasm, hypoxia, hypercapnia and raised intracranial pressure.

== See also ==
- Endoscopy
