= RADA Electronic Industries =

Israeli radar manufacturer

RADA Electronic Industries Ltd.
- Type: Public
- Traded as: Nasdaq: RADA
- Industry: Defense
- Founded: 8 December 1970; 55 years ago
- Founder: David Reitner
- Headquarters: Netanya, Israel
- Key people: Dov Sella (CEO); Yossi Ben Shalom (executive chairman)
- Products: Radar systems & avionics systems
- Services: Aircraft upgrade
- Revenue: ▲US$44.33 million (2019)
- Operating income: ▲US$ 2.1 million (2019)
- Net income: ▲US$ 2.4 million (2019)
- Website: rada.com

RADA Electronic Industries Ltd. is a global defense technology company focused on proprietary radar and legacy avionics systems. It includes RADA Electronic Industries and its U.S-based subsidiaries in its development, manufacture and sale of goods designed primarily for the defense industry and aerospace markets. Its products include software-defined tactical radars, inertial navigation systems and avionics parts. Founded in 1970, it is traded on the NASDAQ Capital Market since 1985.

== History ==
RADA Electronic Industries was founded in 1970 by David Reitner. In 1998, owing to pressure from Boeing, Niessenson retired from his position as CEO of the company. Herzl Boedinger, who was RADA's international marketing manager and president of the U.S.-based subsidiary, and who had earlier been commander of the Israeli Air Force, became president and CEO of RADA. In 2007, Zvi Alon, who was vice president of marketing and sales and had in the 1980s been involved in the Lavi Project, took on the role of CEO.

In November 2016, RADA Electronic Industries announced the appointment of Dov Sella, its chief business development officer, as the company's executive officer.

Since 2016, the company is focused on developing, manufacturing and selling software defined, tactical radar systems for multiple applications such as Active Protection Systems (APS) for combat vehicles, Short-Range Air Defense (SHORAD) for the maneuver force (including Counter-UAS), and Counter Rockets/Artillery/Mortars (C-RAM) systems.

In 2017, the company supplied over a hundred radar systems to the United States Marine Corps. In 2018, the radars were integrated into Rafael's advanced anti-drone defense system for the British Army C-UAS capability. into Leonardo DRS mission equipment package (MEP) for the US Army Initial Maneuver-Short Range Air Defense (IM-SHORAD) capability, into an anti-drone warfare system for the United States Department of Defense against unmanned aerial system (UAS) threats, and into the Israeli Iron Fist Active Protection System for the US Army Bradley Brigade. It opened headquarters and a manufacturing facility in Germantown, Maryland (RADA USA), to develop a local tactical radar market for the U.S. military.

In 2019 RADA's radars took part in various defense missions, including the knock-down of an Iranian drone in the Strait of Hormuz by the United States Marine Corps all-terrain vehicle, which was equipped with an anti-drone detection and jamming system. The growing demand for tactical radars together with the increase in sales by RADA USA, led to the doubling of the yearly revenue and of the share price. In 2020, General Dynamics Land Systems (GDLS) was awarded a $1.2 billion contract by the U.S. Army to produce, test and deliver IM-SHORAD systems, which integrates RADA’s Multi-mission Hemispheric Radar (MHR).

In June 2022 the US subsidiary of the Italian defense conglomerate Leonardo, Leonardo DRS, agreed to an all share acquisition of the US subsidiary of RADA Electronic Industries. The new Leonardo subsidiary will be listed on the Nasdaq and Tel Aviv stock exchanges under the name DRS with RADA shareholders keeping 19.5% of the combined business and Leonardo holding the remainder.

== Products ==
- aCHR (Advanced Compact Hemispheric Radar)
- MHR (Multi-mission Hemispheric Radar)
- ieMHR (Improved and Enhanced Multi-mission Hemispheric Radar)
- exMHR (Enhanced and Extended Multi-mission Hemispheric Radar)
- DVDR & GDS (Digital Video, Data Recorder & Ground Debriefing System)
- R-200M (Mems-based Inertial Navigation System)

== See also ==
- Iron Fist (countermeasure)
- Douglas A-4 Skyhawk
- Chile–Israel relations
- List of Israeli companies quoted on the Nasdaq
