= Miguel Nasur =

Chilean football player and leader

President of the Chilean Football Association
- In office 1985–1986
- Preceded by: Ricardo Abumohor
- Succeeded by: Manuel Córdova Navarrete

Personal details
- Born: 29 September 1935 (age 91) Santiago, Chile
- Occupation: Footballer; Businessman; Leader
- Profession: None
Association football career
- Position: Goalkeeper
Youth career
- Rubén Leyton
- Palestino
Senior career*
| Years | Team | Apps | (Gls) |
| 1952−1960 | Palestino | | |
| 1961 | Santiago Wanderers | 2 | (0) |
| 1962 | San Antonio Unido | | |
| 1963 | UTE | | |
| 1969−1970 | Palestino | 1 | (0) |
- * Club domestic league appearances and goals

Miguel Nasur Allel is a Chilean-Palestinian businessman and former footballer.

== Biography ==
Nasur was born to a family of Syrian and Palestinian descent. He began his football career after graduating high school. He played during the 1950s and '60s in the goalkeeper position. He played for Club Deportivo Palestino and was moved to the professional team in 1954.

He owned the Santiago-based professional team Santiago Morning. He bought the club to become a major shareholder for an undisclosed amount in 2005 after Demetrio Marinakis left the club.

Nasur was President of Asociación Nacional de Fútbol Profesional in 1986. He has also engaged in other ventures such as Chilean land development. He is owner of Radio La Clave and Hotel Los Nogales in Santiago, Chile.

In 2016, Nasur bought the Miami United FC and became its president.

== See also ==
- Munib al-Masri
