= Carla Amtmann =

Chilean politician (born 1987)

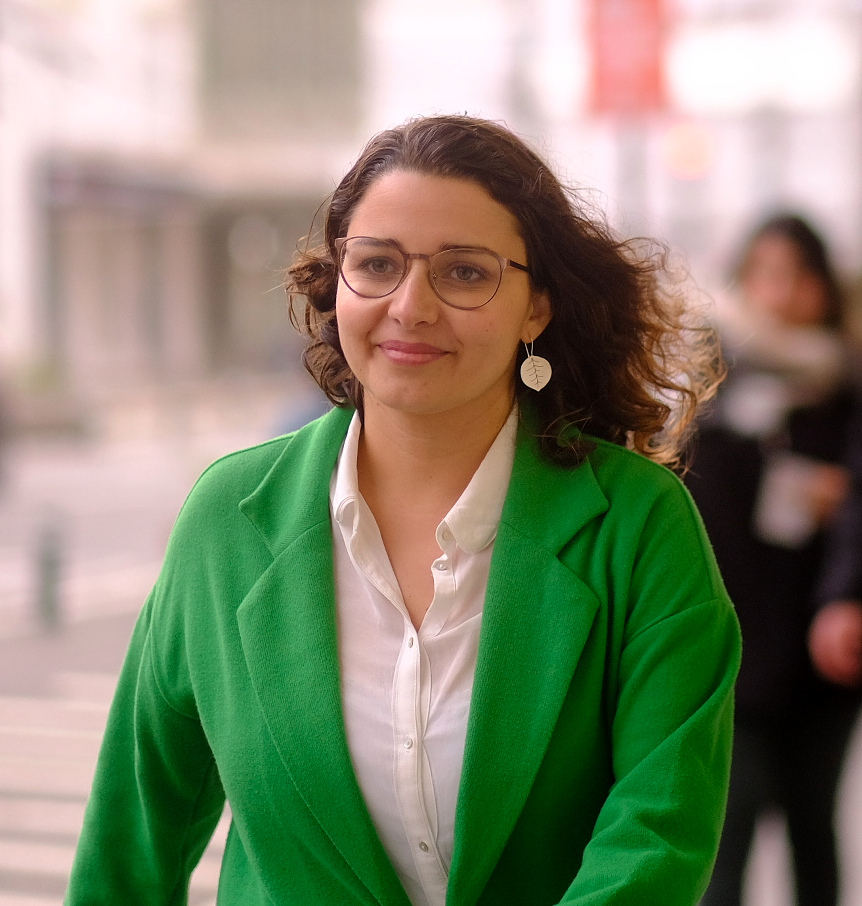

Mayor of Valdivia
- Incumbent
- Assumed office 28 July 2021
- Preceded by: Omar Sabat

President of the Pontifical Catholic University of Valparaíso Students Federation
- In office 2009–2010
- Preceded by: Mauricio Araneda
- Succeeded by: Jorge Sharp

Personal details
- Born: 27 July 1987 (age 39) Valdivia, Chile
- Party: Democratic Revolution
- Education: Pontifical Catholic University of Valparaíso (BA); Alberto Hurtado University (MA); Fordham University (PhD)
- Occupation: Politician
- Profession: Historian; Economist

Carla Andrea Amtmann Fecci (born 27 July 1987) is a Chilean politician. She is the current mayor of Valdivia and also was president of the Pontifical Catholic University of Valparaíso Students Federation.

== Early life ==
Born in Valdivia, Amtmann is the daughter of the scholar Ester Aurora Fecci Pérez and of Carlos Alberto Amtmann Moyano, also a scholar and former head of the Austral University of Chile. She finished her secondary education at Colegio Domus-Mater de Valdivia.

In 2012, Amtmann finished her BA and became a Professor of History, Geography, and Social Sciences at her alma mater Pontificia Universidad Católica de Valparaíso (PUCV). Similarly, she has a master in Applied Economics in Public Policy at the Alberto Hurtado University as well as an International Policy and Economic Development at the Fordham University.

== Political career ==
From 2008 to 2009, Amtmann was president of the Pontifical Catholic University of Valparaíso Students Federation.

In the 2017 Chilean general election, she ran for a seat in the deputy for the 24th District. Nevertheless, she wasn't elected.

Four years later, in the 2021 Chilean municipal elections, she ran for mayor of the Valdivia municipality. In the elections, she obtained 49% of the votes.
