= Chile–Israel relations =

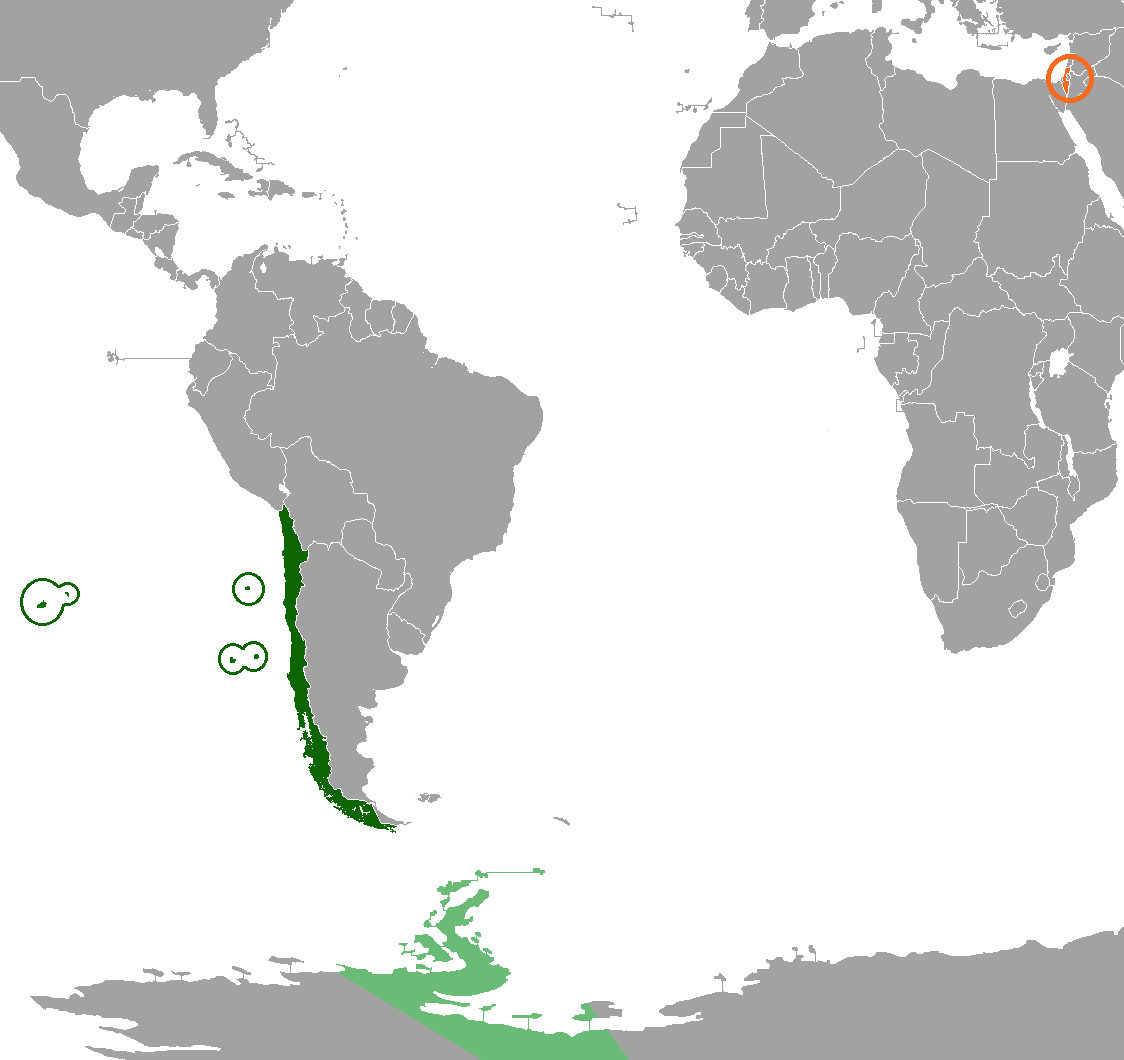
- Chile: Israel

Envoy
- Ambassador: Ambassador

Chile–Israel relations refers to the bilateral and diplomatic ties between the Republic of Chile and the State of Israel. Chile recognized Israel's independence in February 1949. Both countries established diplomatic relation on 16 May 1950, with Israel sending their first ambassador on that date and Chile sending their first ambassador on 16 June 1952. Chile has an embassy in Tel Aviv. Israel has an embassy in Santiago.

== High level visits ==
In November 1983, Chilean Foreign Minister Miguel Schweitzer Walters visited Israel. The Israeli Attorney General Yitzhak Zamir raised the issue of extraditing suspected Nazi war criminal Walter Rauff. Walters said he could not extradite Rauff due to Chilean statute of limitations. In 1984, a further request was made by the Director General of the Israeli Foreign Ministry for Rauff's extradition to Chilean Foreign Minister Jaime del Valle. Del Valle stated that it would be "inappropriate" to expel Rauff. Former Prime Minister of Israel Golda Meir visited Chile with her Foreign Affairs Minister Shimon Peres and March 2005 saw the first official visit to Israel when Minister of Foreign Affairs Ignacio Walker made the trip with a delegation.

In June 2019, Chilean President Sebastián Piñera made a visit to Israel. During the visit he met Israeli President Reuven Rivlin and Prime Minister Benjamin Netanyahu. During his visit president Piñera praised "long history of friendship and collaboration" between Chile and Israel.

== Military collaboration ==
The Military and Naval Attaché and Defense and Air Attaché offices as part of the Chilean Embassy to Israel seek to maintain and increase the bonds with the Israeli Defence Forces "in order to make knowledge, training and experiences exchange possible" and increase "the military bonds between the Ministry of Defense and its Israeli counterpart, in order to comply with the Chilean Foreign and Defense Policy".

Israel supplied weaponry to Augusto Pinochet's military dictatorship. In 1981, the Pinochet regime purchased 150 M-51 Sherman tanks from Israel Military Industries. Later in 1988, the Chilean Government, together with the Israeli Government and the US State Department, blocked the transfer of F5 fighter jets from Chile to Iran in return for the potential release of four American hostages.

Israel is a major supplier of military hardware to the Chilean Armed Forces. In 1993, the IAI Phalcon system was sold to the Chilean Air Force.

In 2002, Chilean Air Force selected Israeli military manufacturer RADA Electronic Industries for the supply of an advanced digital debriefing solution for its new F-16 C/D aircraft purchase. In December 2010, Israel's three major manufacturers of unmanned air vehicles submitted proposals in a bid to the Chilean Air Force.

== Israeli assistance ==
Following the 1965 Chile earthquake, the Israeli Government offered medical equipment and supplies. Following the 2010 Chile earthquake, the Israeli Government released a statement stating "Israel stands by the Chilean government and people and wishes to send its condolences to the victims' families and offer its support to the residents at this trying time". The Israeli Government offered medical and engineering aid to Chile. Israeli company Rafael Advanced Defense Systems loaned the Chilean Air Force two unmanned aerial vehicles to help assess post earthquake damage.

== Bilateral agreements ==
Since 1953, Israel and Chile have signed numerous bilateral agreements:

- Agreement on Cultural Exchange (1953)
- Agreement on Scientific and Technical Cooperation (1965)
- Agreement on Peaceful Use of Nuclear Energy (1965)
- Agreement on Amateur Radio Operators (1982)
- Arrangement on Air Services within and beyond the respective borders (1982)
- Commercial and Economic Cooperation Agreement (1982)
- Executive Program of Cultural Exchange (1983)
- CONAF – Keren Kayemet Leisrael Agreement on Cooperation and Forest Technical Assistance (1983)
- Agreement on Tourist Cooperation (1986)
- Agreement on Narcotics and Psychotropic Substances Control (1993)
- Agreement on Visa Exemption in Diplomatic, Official, Special and Service Passports (1994)
- Agreement on Cultural, Scientific and Technical Cooperation (1995)
- Joint Commission on Culture, held in Jerusalem (1996)
- Agreement on Remunerated Activities for Relatives of a Diplomatic Mission or Consular Representation (2007)
- Memorandum of Understanding on the Establishment of Bilateral Consultations between the Ministries of Foreign Affairs of Chile and Israel (2007)
- Cooperative forestry agreement. (1993)

In October 2010, Israeli Prime Minister Benjamin Netanyahu invited Chilean President Sebastián Piñera to Israel for the signing of a free trade agreement between the two countries.

== Security incidents ==
In 2009, a bullet was fired into the car of the Israeli ambassador to Chile, David Dadon, smashing the windshield. Dadon was not in the car and no one was injured, but security was tightened.

== Jews of Chile ==
In 2006, Michelle Bachelet's newly elected Chilean cabinet was described as the "most Jewish government in the world." The Ministers of Public Works (Eduardo Bitran), Planning and Cooperation (Clarissa Hardy), Mining and Energy (Karen Poniachik) and Deputy Foreign Minister (Alberto van Klaveren) were Jewish. Later, Bachelet's successor Sebastián Piñera would appoint the also Jewish Rodrigo Hinzpeter as Minister of Interior Government and later as Minister of Defense.

Chile has a Jewish community estimated at 10,000 to 16,000 mainly centered on Santiago. Some estimates put the total Jewish population as high as 20,700.

== Issue of Palestine ==
In 2006, a number of Chilean politicians including Deputies Iván Paredes and Sergio Aguiló "strongly condemned the Israeli aggression against the Palestinian people in the Gaza Strip and the West Bank and urged the Chilean government to recall their ambassador to Tel Aviv until the aggressions are brought to an end". The leader of the socialist bloc in the Chilean parliament, Alejandro Navarro, said, "Latin America must react as one single voice against what is going on in the occupied Palestinian territories". Mr. Navarro also reported that they are going to "organize a delegation of Chilean lawmakers to act as international observers in the occupied Palestinian territory and to express solidarity with the Palestinian people." A member of the Chilean communist party, Hugo Gutierrez, described Israel as a "terrorist state" and demanded the United Nations to "act on behalf of the international law to stop the massacres and to achieve Palestinian sovereignty over their land".

In January 2011, the Chilean government adopted a resolution "recognising the existence of the State of Palestine as a free, independent and sovereign state". A senior Israeli official responded saying "It is a useless and empty gesture because it will not change anything. The Chilean announcement, like those preceding it in Latin America, will not encourage the Palestinians to negotiate." President of Chile, Sebastián Piñera, said "In this way we contribute to that end that may exist in the Middle East, a Palestinian state and a state of Israel that can live in peace and prosperity and recognized frontiers with secure borders".

In response, Gabriel Zaliasnik, president of the Jewish community in Chile, thought Israel's Foreign Ministry made a mistake. Zaliasnik believed the statement that eventually emerged from the Chilean Government accepting Palestinian independence while acknowledging Israel's right to security was "not the diplomatic debacle some made it out to be, but in fact was a victory of sorts".

In July 2014, the government of Michelle Bachelet summoned its ambassador in Israel during the Gaza conflict saying Israeli operation "breach fundamental norms in international humanitarian law".

In 2018 the Chilean commune of Valdivia declared itself "Free of Israeli Apartheid" (Spanish: Libre de Apartheid Israelí). According to the mayor of Valdivia Omar Sabat this mean the municipality would "restrain from purchasing any services from companies related to the Israeli apartheid". The municipal decree was declared unconstitutional by the Comptroller General of Chile in December 2018.

On September 15, 2022, an unusual diplomatic incident occurred, when the incumbent Chilean president Gabriel Boric refused to accept the charter from the new Israeli ambassador. According to reports this is because of "the President's anger over Operation Break the Wave." Subsequently, the Chilean Foreign Ministry issued an apology to the Israeli ambassador, which was accepted by the latter. Israel reprimanded Chile's "bizarre and unprecedented behavior."

In protest of the Gaza war, Chile recalled its ambassador from Israel. In June 2026, new President of Chile, José Antonio Kast, appointed Gabriel Zaliasnik, a former Jewish community leader, as Chilean new ambassador to Israel after nearly three years without a Chilean ambassador in Israel.

== See also ==
- Foreign relations of Chile
- Foreign relations of Israel
- History of the Jews in Latin America and the Caribbean
- International recognition of Israel
- List of Chilean Jews
