= City National Bank of Florida =

Bank in Florida, United States

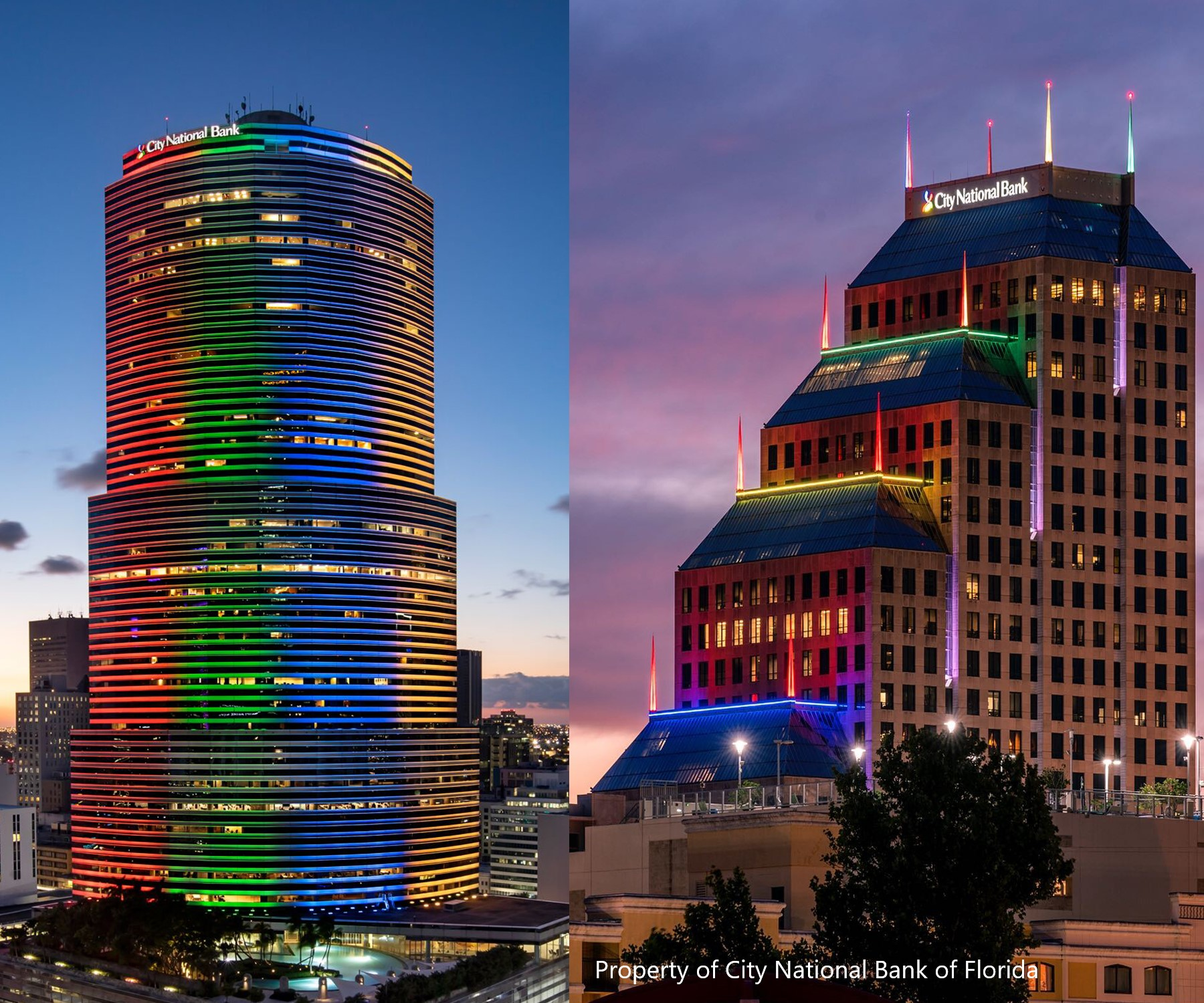
- Type: Subsidiary
- Industry: Financial services Bank Holding Company
- Founded: 1946; 80 years ago
- Headquarters: Miami, Florida
- Area served: Florida
- Key people: Jorge González (CEO)
- Products: Retail banking, Consumer banking, Commercial bank, corporate banking, investment banking, mortgage loans, private banking, private equity, wealth management, credit cards, financial analysis
- Parent: BCI
- Website: www.citynationalcm.com

City National Bank of Florida (CNBFL), based in Miami, Florida, is the second-largest financial institution in the state with over $26 billion in assets. CNBFL has 30 branches, from Miami-Dade County to the greater Orlando area, and nearly 1,000 employees. Since 2015, CNBFL has been owned by Chilean bank BCI.

== History ==
City National Bank of Florida was established in 1946 when Leonard L. Abess, Sr., Max Orovitz, and Baron de Hirsch Meyer founded the North Shore Bank on 71st Street in Miami Beach. In the 1950s, Industrial National Bank at 46 West Flagler Street was added and the bank moved into new headquarters at 25 West Flagler Street. Standing at only 172 feet, one of Orlando’s tallest banking structures. CNBFL's corporate offices are located in Downtown Miami's Miami Tower. CNBFL has branches in Broward and Palm Beach counties as well as the Orlando and Winter Park, Florida communities.

Caja Madrid, based in Spain, approached CNBFL in early 2008 and purchased the bank. In 2009, Jorge Gonzalez, a 20-year veteran banker with Wachovia, became the president and CEO of CNBFL. In May 2013, Bankia, formerly Caja Madrid, announced that it had signed an agreement to sell CNBFL to Banco de Credito e Inversiones (BCI), based in Chile.

In December 2017, CNBFL acquired TotalBank from Banco Santander for $528 million. TotalBank had been a subsidiary of Banco Popular Español, which Santander absorbed in 2017. In July 2018, the branches of TotalBank were converted to CNBFL locations. CNBFL acquired Executive National Bank, in 2020.

City National Bank of Florida's 12 Board of Directors are Chairman Eugenio von Chrismar Carvajal, Patricia Menendez Cambo, Hector Tundidor Jr., Neisen O. Kasdin, Esq., Maria Grisel Vega, Ronald Lindhart, Diego Yarur Arrasate, Charles C. Papy, Carlos Becerra, Jaret L. Davis and Jorge Gonzalez.

== Awards and recognition ==
City National Bank of Florida has been recognized for its community involvement and has held an “Outstanding” community reinvestment rating from the Office of the Comptroller of the Currency (OCC) for the past 18 years. It continues to be one of the most liquid and best capitalized banks in Florida and is rated 5 stars "Superior" by BauerFinancial. CNBFL was named one of the Best Banks to Work For by American Banker magazine, for two consecutive years. CNBFL was voted Best Community Bank, Best Business Bank, Best Bank for Commercial Real Estate, Best Bank for Jumbo Loans, Best Private Bank and Best Foreign National Mortgage Lender by the readers of the Daily Business Review for the eight consecutive years as of 2020. The South Florida Business Journal named it Business of the Year in 2013 and Community Bank of the Year in 2013 and 2011.

CNBFL was the only retail bank in Florida that had no customer complaints filed against it with state regulators in 2011. The bank posted record earnings in 2012. These benchmarks have earned City National Bank recognition by the community, media and analysts:

- Named Business of the Year by the South Florida Business Journal in 2013
- Voted the Best Business Bank by the readers of the Daily Business Review in 2012
- 5-Star “Superior” rating by BauerFinancial since June 2012
- Jorge Gonzalez named Ultimate CEO by the South Florida Business Journal
- Named the South Florida Business Journal's Local/Community Bank of the Year in 2011. *Recognized by the South Florida Business Journal and received the Outstanding Community Service Award in 2012
- Mara Suarez named Businesswoman of the Year by the Coral Gables Chamber of Commerce in 2013
