= Shigeto Ikeda =

Japanese physician

Shigeto Ikeda (池田 茂人, Ikeda Shigeto; 1925 - 2001) was a Japanese physician, regarded as the "father" of fiberoptic bronchoscopy.

He graduated from Keio University School of Medicine in 1952 and joined the Thoracic Surgery department. In 1966, he developed the first flexible bronchoscope in conjunction with Machida Endoscope Co. Ltd (later taken over by Pentax) and Olympus Optical Co., Ltd. This allowed better visualisation of the upper lobe bronchi than is possible with the rigid bronchoscope. Successive improvements under his supervision included the development of video-bronchoscopy.

His motto was "there is more hope with the bronchoscope".
