= Luis Enrique Yarur Rey =

Chilean heir and banker (born c. 1951)

- Born: c. 1951
- Education: IESE, University of Navarra
- Occupation: Banker
- Children: 8
- Relatives: Juan Yarur Lolas (great-uncle); Jorge Yarur Banna (uncle)

Luis Enrique Yarur Rey (born c. 1951) is a Chilean heir and banker. He serves as the chairman of Banco de Crédito e Inversiones. He is the vice chairman of the Chilean Banking Association. As of December 2016, he is worth an estimated US$1.34 billion according to Forbes.
