= Juan Yarur =

American art collector

Juan Yarur Torres
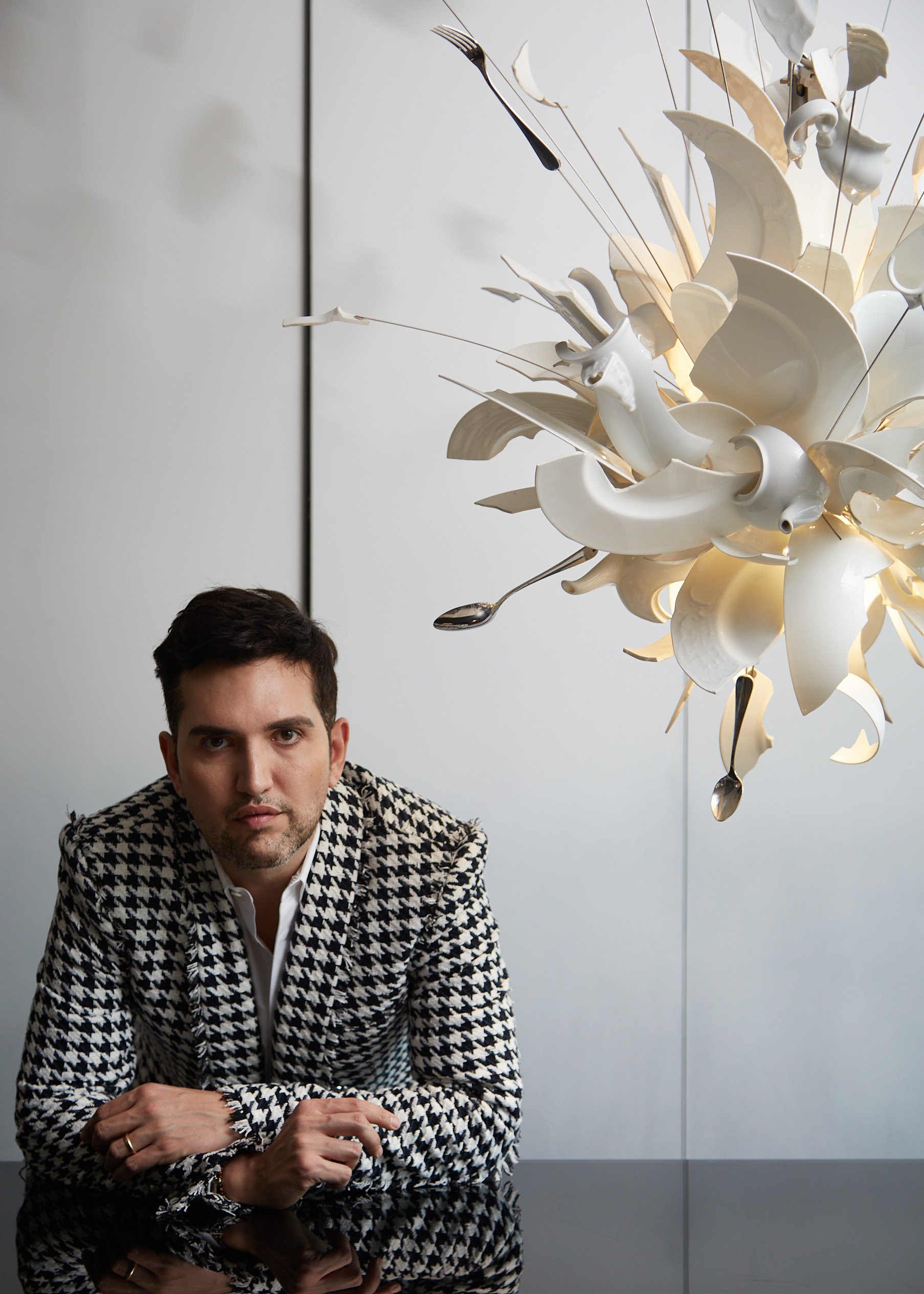
- Born: February 9, 1984; Santiago
- Occupation: Art collector
- Parent: Amador Yarur (father)
- Relatives: Juan Yarur Lolas (grandfather)
- Website: https://fundacionama.com/

Juan Yarur is a Chilean Palestinian collector of contemporary art and the founder of the Santiago based non-profit AMA Foundation. He presently resides in New York and Santiago.

== Personal life ==
Yarur was born in Santiago. He is the son of Chilean Palestinian businessman Amador Yarur and grandson of Juan Yarur Lolas.

== Art career ==
He is member of Acquisition Committee of The Museum of Modern Art (MoMA), the Metropolitan Museum of Art (MET), Museum of Fine Arts, Houston, and The Tate Modern.

In 2011 he exhibited his art collection first time at Saatchi Gallery and Phillips de Pury, London.

He was the first Chilean collector to exhibit his collection at the Museum of Contemporary Arts in 2013.

In December 2018 Yarur entered into a civil agreement with fashion producer Felipe Lecaros in Vitacura.

In homage to his father, Yarur founded a Santiago based non-profit AMA scholarship and foundation. The foundation promotes contemporary Chilean artists.

In 2018 Yarur received the Montblanc award for Culture Arts Patronage for his contribution to the development of Chilean artists and the promoting the national art through his nonprofit AMA Foundation.

In 2019, ARTnews, New York based art magazine nominated him among the most important collectors of the world.

In recognition of his contribution protecting the arts, Yarur was awarded with Lorenzo de Medici Prize in November 2021.
