= Electromagnetic navigation bronchoscopy =

- Other names: EMN bronchoscopy
- Specialty: Radiology interventional

Electromagnetic navigation bronchoscopy (ENB) is a medical procedure utilizing electromagnetic technology designed to localize and guide endoscopic tools or catheters through the bronchial pathways of the lung. Using a virtual, three-dimensional (3D) bronchial map from a recently computed tomography (CT) chest scan and disposable catheter set, physicians are able to navigate to a desired location within the lung to biopsy lesions, stage lymph nodes, insert markers to guide radiotherapy or guide brachytherapy catheters.

== Components ==
The ENB system consists of four essential components:

- A disposable working channel (or sheath) that extends beyond the reach of the bronchoscope and becomes a pathway to the lesion for subsequent diagnosis and treatment;
- A disposable guide catheter which contains a location sensor at its distal tip and is capable of 360° steering;
- The software which provides the physician with planning and navigation views of the lungs via a merged CT image;
- The hardware which includes the computer, monitors and the electromagnetic board.

== Overview ==
Electromagnetic navigation bronchoscopy consists of two primary phases: planning and navigation. In the planning phase previously acquired CT scans are utilized to mark and plan pathways to targets within the lung. In the navigation phase these previously planned targets and pathways are displayed and can be utilized for navigation and access deep within the lung. Upon arriving at the target ENB enables multiple applications all within the same procedure.

=== Planning Phase ===
CT scans of the patient's chest are loaded into proprietary software that reconstructs the patient's airways in multiple 3D images. The physician utilizes these images to mark target locations and plan pathways to these target locations within the lungs.

=== Navigation Phase ===
Using the planned pathway created in the Planning Phase and real-time guidance, the physician navigates the steerable sensor probe and extended working channel to the desired target location(s). Once at the desired location, the physician locks the extended working channel in place and the steerable sensor probe is removed. The extended working channel provides access to the target lesion for standard bronchoscopic tools or catheters.

== History ==
According to the Aetna Clinical Policy Bulletin on ENB, "In 2004, the FDA cleared for marketing through the 510(k) process the Medtronic superDimension/Bronchus system, also known as the inReach system (superDimension, Ltd, Israel), a minimally invasive image-guidance localization and navigation system that uses electromagnetic guidance for the management of peripheral lung lesions. The system consists of several components: a guide catheter, a steerable navigation catheter, and planning and navigation software and hardware (i.e., computer and monitor). Navigation is facilitated by an electromagnetic tracking system that detects a position sensor incorporated into a flexible catheter advanced through a bronchoscope. Information obtained during bronchoscopy is super-imposed on previously acquired computed tomography (CT) data and 3-dimensional virtual images. The system was designed to solve the clinical problem of reaching small suspected lesions in the peripheral lung airways and mediastinal lymph nodes and is being proposed as an alternative to open surgical biopsy of distant lung lesions and as an alternative to transthoracic implantation of radiosurgical markers."

== Field use and prospective studies ==
Despite the medical advances of detection, diagnosis and treatment methods throughout the past 50 years, lung cancer causes more deaths than any other cancer in both men and women. Currently, lung cancer is the most common form of cancer diagnosed in the United States and a major cause of death, accounting for 14% of all cancers.

The most effective way of stopping cancer comes at diagnosis and treatment in the early stages. Lung cancer diagnosed in the early stages yields an 88% survival rate at ten years versus 16% at five years when found in the later stages, although 88% rate has only been achieved once.

Although 1 in 500 chest X-rays show a peripheral lesion, 65% of traditional bronchoscopes fail to reach these distant lesions. More invasive diagnostic techniques are then necessary, posing a greater potential for complications such as pneumothorax. Patients with poor lung function may not tolerate more invasive procedures, leaving them with "watchful waiting" as their only option.

There are four publications that show that peripheral lung lesions can be diagnosed successfully in 69% to 86% of cases using the Medtronic superDimension system.

According to the American Journal of Respiratory and Critical Care Medicine, a prospective ... study was conducted to determine the ability of electromagnetic navigation bronchoscopy to sample peripheral lung lesions and mediastinal lymph nodes with standard bronchoscopic instruments and demonstrate safety the ENB." The results provided a "yield/procedure [rate at] 74% and 100% for peripheral lesions and lymph nodes, respectively." Additionally, "a diagnosis was obtained in 80.4% of bronchoscopic procedures." The study concluded that ENB "is a safe method for sampling peripheral and mediastinal lesions with high diagnostic yield independent of lesion size and location".

A similar study of 40 patients issued in the European Respiratory Journal resulted in an overall 62.5% diagnostic yield and concluded; "electromagnetic navigation bronchoscopy without additional fluoroscopic guidance is a safe and efficient technique for the diagnosis of peripheral pulmonary nodules. The overall diagnostic yield found in the present study is superior to rates reported in most previous studies performed for small peripheral pulmonary nodules with bronchoscopy".

Virtual bronchoscopy continues to be an active subject for basic engineering research. The Bioelectromagnetics group at University College Cork has developed a novel low-cost tracking system for use in electromagnetic navigation bronchoscopy. The group is also collaborating with the Surgical Planning Laboratory at Harvard Medical School to develop the world's first open-source virtual bronchoscopy module to be implemented in the 3DSlicer environment.
