= Mohammed Qasem =

Palestinian footballer (born 1987)

Personal information
- Full name: Mohammed Samir Saleh Qasem
- Date of birth: 17 January 1987 (age 39)
- Place of birth: Tripoli, Libya
- Height: 1.72 m (5 ft 8 in)
- Position: Midfielder

Team information
- Current team: Sagesse

Senior career*
Years	Team	Apps	(Gls)
2010–2011	Al-Ittihad Tripoli		
2011–2012	Al-Wahda Tripoli		
2012–2016	Nejmeh	54	(3)
2016–2018	Safa	40	(1)
2018–2019	Ansar	3	(0)
2019	Bekaa	8	(1)
2019–2022	Bourj	30	(2)
2022	Sagesse	0	(0)
2025–	Tripoli	7	(0)

International career
2013	Palestine	1	(0)
- * Club domestic league appearances and goals as of 11:10, 23 July 2022 (UTC)

Mohammed Samir Saleh Qasem (Arabic: محمد سمير صالح قاسم; born 17 January 1987) is a Palestinian footballer who plays as a midfielder for Lebanese Premier League club Tripoli.

== Club career ==
In July 2022, Qasem signed for Lebanese Premier League side Sagesse.

== Honours ==
Al-Ittihad Tripoli

- Libyan Super Cup: 2010

Nejmeh

- Lebanese Premier League: 2013–14
- Lebanese FA Cup: 2015–16
- Lebanese Elite Cup: 2014
- Lebanese Super Cup: 2014

Bourj

- Lebanese Challenge Cup: 2019
