= Yamil Ethit =

Chilean politician

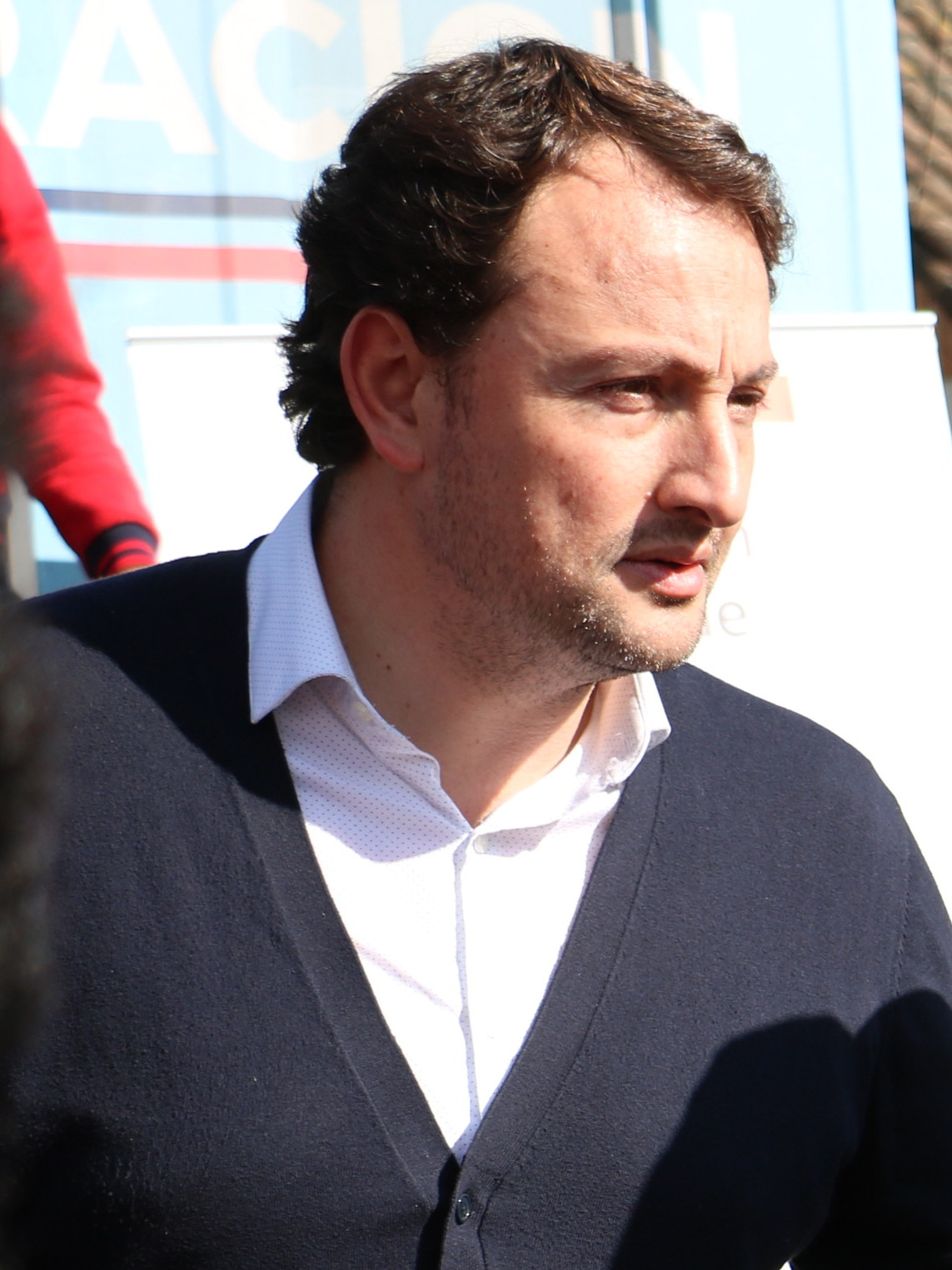
- Ethit in 2018

Mayor of Santa Cruz
- Incumbent
- Assumed office 6 December 2024
- Preceded by: William Arévalo

Regional Councilor of O'Higgins
- In office 11 March 2022 – 24 October 2023
- Succeeded by: Mauricio Donoso
- Constituency: Colchagua Province

Governor of Colchagua Province
- In office 11 March 2018 – 20 November 2020
- President: Sebastián Piñera
- Preceded by: Luis Barra
- Succeeded by: Manuel Cuadra

Personal details
- Born: Yamil Andrés Ethit Romero; 21 August 1981 (age 44) Santa Cruz, Chile
- Party: Independent Democratic Union
- Children: 2
- Education: Universidad SEK Chile
- Profession: Lawyer

Yamil Andrés Ethit Romero (born 21 August 1981) is a Chilean lawyer and politician, who serves as mayor of Santa Cruz since December 2024. Previously, he served as governor of the province of Colchagua (2018–2020) and later as a regional councilor for the O'Higgins Region (2022–2023), representing Colchagua Province.

== Biography ==
Born in Santa Cruz, Chile, Ethit comes from a family of merchants and is of Palestinian-Arab descent; he is the grandson of Indrawes Ethit Farah, a Palestinian immigrant who arrived in Santa Cruz in 1920. He earned his law degree at Universidad Internacional SEK Chile. He is married and a father of two children.

He worked in the Victims of Violent Crime Unit of the Ministry of the Interior and Public Security.

In the municipal sector, he was legal advisor to the Municipality of Nancagua and Chépica. Additionally, he served as a leader of sports clubs for several years. On 11 March 2018, he took office as governor of the province of Colchagua, appointed by President Sebastián Piñera. However, on 20 November 2020, he effectively resigned from his position as governor in order to be legally eligible for the parliamentary elections of 2021.

In 2021, he was elected Regional Councilor of the O'Higgins Region, representing Colchagua Province, taking office on 11 March 2022. He resigned on 24 October 2023 to participate in the 2024 municipal elections. He was elected mayor of Santa Cruz and took office on 6 December 2024.
