= Omar Khalil =

Association football player

Personal information
- Date of birth: March 8, 1977 (age 49)
- Place of birth: Damascus, Syria
- Height: 1.73 m (5 ft 8 in)
- Position: Midfielder

Team information
- Current team: Al-Majd
- Number: 20

Youth career
- Al-Majd

Senior career*
Years	Team	Apps	(Gls)
1995–2001	Al-Majd		
2001–2002	Al-Jaish		
2002–2004	Al-Majd		
2004–2005	Hutteen		
2005–2010	Al-Wahda		
2011–2013	Al-Muhafaza		

International career
1996–1997	Syria U20		
2003–2006	Palestine		
- * Club domestic league appearances and goals

Omar Khalil (Arabic: عمر خليل; born 8 March 1977) is a former footballer who played as a midfielder.

Born in Syria, Khalil represented his native country at under-20 level, before switching allegiance to Palestine. He made several appearances for the Palestine national team, including a 2006 FIFA World Cup qualifying match against Iraq on 16 November 2004.
