= Muhamed Alghoul =

Palestinian football player

Personal information
- Date of birth: 9 April 1996 (age 30)
- Place of birth: Zagreb, Croatia
- Height: 1.72 m (5 ft 8 in)
- Position: Attacking midfielder

Team information
- Current team: Homs Al Fidaa

Youth career
- –2010: Nur Zagreb
- 2010–2011: Lokomotiva
- 2011–2012: Dinamo Zagreb
- 2012–2014: Lokomotiva

Senior career*
Years	Team	Apps	(Gls)
2014–2016	Lokomotiva	2	(0)
2016–2018	Dubrava	?	(?)
2017	→ Vinogradar (loan)	?	(?)
2018–2019	Hrvatski Dragovoljac	11	(0)
2019	FC Dietikon	9	(4)
2019–2022	Dubrava	54	(12)
2022	Academica Clinceni	13	(2)
2022–2023	Wadi Degla	0	(0)
2023	Keflavík	8	(1)
2024	Jarun Zagreb	13	(3)
2024–2025	Khroub		
2025–2026	Keflavík	44	(11)
2026–	Homs Al Fidaa		

International career^{‡}
2015	Croatia U20	1	(0)
2015	Croatia U21	1	(0)
2025–	Palestine	1	(0)
- * Club domestic league appearances and goals as of 18 September 2026 ‡ National team caps and goals as of 14:37, 19 November 2025 (UTC)

Muhamed Alghoul (Arabic: محمد الغول; born 9 April 1996) is a Palestinian professional footballer who plays as an attacking midfielder for Syrian club Homs Al Fidaa. Born in Croatia, he plays for the Palestine national team.

== Early life ==
Alghoul was born in Zagreb, Croatia to a Palestinian father from Gaza, and a Croatian mother of Bosniak descent. He has a younger brother, Khalid, who also plays football. Alghoul is Muslim.

== Club career ==
Alghoul started his career with Croatian First League side Lokomotiva, where he made two appearances, before suffering a knee injury. On 5 October 2014, he debuted for Lokomotiva in a 3–0 defeat to Dinamo Zagreb. Before the second half of 2015–16, Alghoul signed for Dubrava in the Croatian Third League.

In 2018, Alghoul signed for Croatian Second League club Hrvatski Dragovoljac, where he was nicknamed the "Palestinian Luka Modrić". Before the second half of 2018–19, Alghoul signed for FC Dietikon in the Swiss fifth division. In 2019, he returned to Dubrava.

In January 2022, Alghoul moved to Romanian Liga I side Academica Clinceni.

== International career ==
Alghoul represented Croatia at under-20 and under-21 levels in 2015.

Eligible to represent Palestine internationally through his father, he was first called up to the national team for the 2021 FIFA Arab Cup. He debuted with Palestine in a friendly 3–0 loss to the Basque Country on 16 November 2025.
