= Juan Yarur Lolas =

Palestinian-Chilean banker (1894–1954)

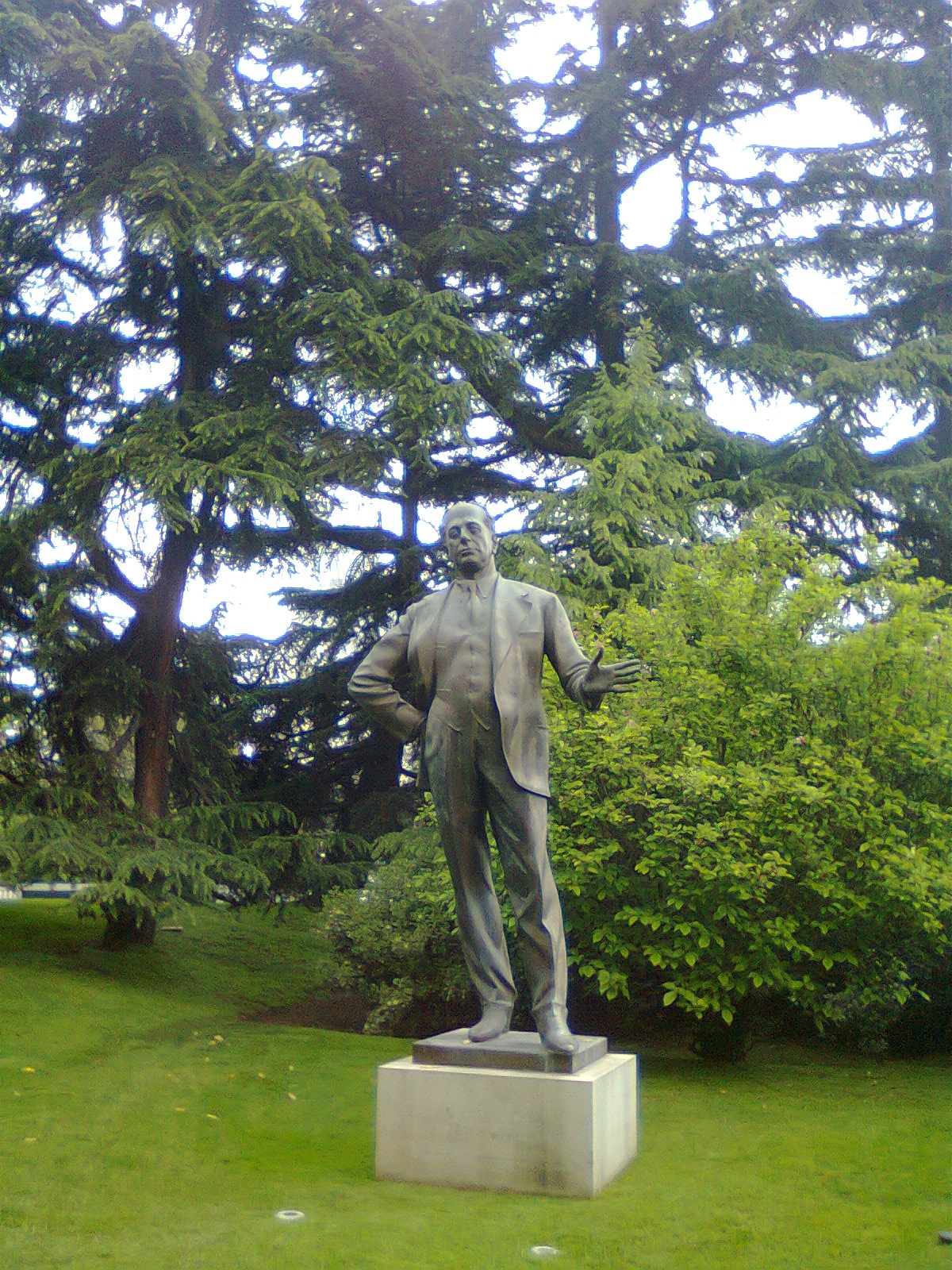
- Statue in the Museum of Fashion, Santiago, Chile
- Born: January 8, 1894; Bethlehem, Mutasarrifate of Jerusalem
- Died: August 21, 1954 (aged 60); Santiago, Chile
- Occupation: Banker
- Children: Jorge Yarur Banna
- Relatives: Amador Yarur (son); Juan Yarur (grandson); Luis Enrique Yarur Rey (great-nephew)

Juan Yarur Lolas (January 8, 1894 - August 21, 1954) was a Palestinian-Chilean banker.

== Biography ==
Yarur Lolas an Arab-Christian emigrated from Palestine, then part of the Ottoman Empire, with his younger brother Nicolas in 1902 and set out for Latin America, where they already had relatives in Chile and Bolivia. After working as peddlers for a few years, the two eventually set up a small textile plant in La Paz in 1929. They were invited by President Arturo Alessandri in the mid-1930s to set up larger operations in Santiago, even offering generous incentives that included no custom duties on imported machine tools, low tariffs for imported supplies, and a loan exceeding $1 million USD from the country's largest bank. The brothers accepted it and founded a cotton manufacturing company in 1936. By 1948, this plant was employing more than 3,000 workers and was producing around 60% of the country’s cotton fabric, making it the largest textile plant in Latin America at that time.

Earlier in 1937, Yarur also co-founded Banco de Crédito e Inversiones, serving as its president from 1946 to 1954. The bank is still owned by his descendants.

Yarur was the president of the Arab colony in Santiago, Chile. Together with the German colony, he tried to hire Hjalmar Schacht, Adolf Hitler's Economy Minister, as a "financial adviser" shortly after World War II, but the plan fell through when it became news.

In April 1971, the Yurar textile factory was forcefully nationalised by the Allende government, alongside other successful enterprises owned by Palestinian immigrants. In light of these immigrants' quick economic success, they received relatively little sympathy from the Chilean bourgeoisie.
