= Omar Sabat =

Chilean forest engineer and politician

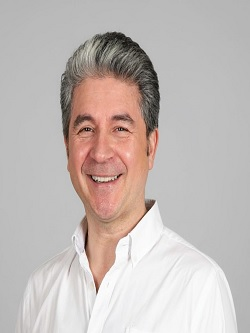

Member of the Chamber of Deputies
- Incumbent
- Assumed office 11 March 2026
- Constituency: 24th District

Mayor of Valdivia
- In office 6 December 2012 – 28 June 2021
- Preceded by: Bernardo Berger
- Succeeded by: Carla Amtmann

Personal details
- Born: 12 July 1976 (age 49) Valdivia, Chile
- Parent(s): Jorge Sabat; Inés Guzmán
- Profession: Forest engineer

Omar Rashid Sabat Guzmán (born 12 July 1976) is a Chilean forest engineer and politician. He previously served as Mayor of Valdivia for two consecutive terms and was elected in 2025 as a Member of the Chamber of Deputies representing the 24th District in the Los Ríos Region.

== Biography ==
Sabat Guzmán was born on 12 July 1979 in Valdivia, Chile, and is of Palestinian descent on his father's side. Before entering national politics, he became widely known for his long tenure as Mayor of Valdivia, where he developed urban modernisation projects, tourism initiatives, and environmental programmes focusing on riverfront recovery.

In June 2024, he was caught by the police driving under the influence of alcohol in the city of Valdivia. After being formally charged in September of that year, his driver's license was suspended for two years and he was ordered to pay a fine of one hundred thousand Chilean pesos to the Fire Department.

== Political career ==
Sabat served as Mayor of Valdivia between 2012 and 2021, securing re-election due to strong local support. His administration focused on urban development, public safety, and cultural revitalisation of the regional capital.

In the 2025 parliamentary elections, he ran as a candidate of Chile Grande y Unido and was elected Deputy for the 24th District, becoming one of the main right-wing figures in the Los Ríos Region.
