= Joaquín Abdala =

Association football player (born 2000)

Personal information
- Full name: Joaquín Naid Sebastián Abdala Astudillo
- Date of birth: 19 January 2000 (age 26)
- Place of birth: Cabrero, Chile
- Height: 1.82 m (6 ft 0 in)
- Position: Midfielder

Team information
- Current team: Al-Nasr SC

Youth career
- Huachipato

Senior career*
Years	Team	Apps	(Gls)
2020–2021	Coquimbo Unido	19	(0)
2020	→ Independiente Cauquenes (loan)	4	(0)
2022	Trasandino	0	(0)
2022–2023	Shabab Al-Khalil	–	(–)
2023–2024	Comunal Cabrero	–	(–)
2025–	Al-Nasr SC	0	(0)

International career^{‡}
2022–	Palestine	2	(0)
- * Club domestic league appearances and goals as of 19 February 2025 ‡ National team caps and goals as of 2 December 2022

Joaquín Naid Sebastián Abdala Astudillo (born 19 January 2000) is a professional footballer who plays as a midfielder for Libyan Premier League club Al-Nasr SC. Born in Chile, he represents the Palestine national team.

== Club career ==
Having played at the Fútbol Joven (Youth Football) level for Huachipato, he joined Coquimbo Unido on 2020 season. On 6 December 2020, he was confirmed as new player of Independiente de Cauquenes.

In November 2022, he moved to Palestine and joined Shabab Al-Khalil in the West Bank Premier League.

In June 2023, Abdala signed with Comunal Cabrero in the Chilean Tercera A, with his father, Edgardo, as coach.

In February 2025, Abdala moved to Libya and signed with Al-Nasr SC.

== International career ==
In 2022, Abadala was called up to the Palestine national team for the 2023 AFC Asian Cup qualifiers in June.

== Personal life ==
Abadala is the son of the former Palestine international footballer Edgardo Abdala.

== Career statistics ==
=== Club ===
As of 20 January 2021

Club	Season	League			Cup		Continental		Other		Total	
Club	Season	Division	Apps	Goals	Apps	Goals	Apps	Goals	Apps	Goals	Apps	Goals
Coquimbo Unido	2020	Primera División	12	0	—		0	0	0	0	12	0
Independiente de Cauquenes	2020	Segunda División	4	0	—		—		0	0	4	0
Total career			16	0	0	0	0	0	0	0	16	0

== Honours ==
Coquimbo Unido

- Primera B (1): 2021
