= Néstor Narbona =

Palestine footballer (born 1979)

Personal information
- Full name: Néstor Marcelo Narbona Pizarro
- Date of birth: 23 January 1979 (age 47)
- Place of birth: Chile
- Position: Defender

Senior career*
Years	Team	Apps	(Gls)
1997–2002	Deportes La Serena		
2003	Coquimbo Unido		
2004	Palestino		
2004	Deportes La Serena		
2005	Deportes Antofagasta		

International career
2003	Palestine	6	(0)
- * Club domestic league appearances and goals

Néstor Marcelo Narbona Pizarro (born 23 January 1979) is a former professional footballer who is last known to have played as a defender for La Serena. Born in Chile, he was a Palestine international.

== Career ==
In his country of birth, Narbona played for Deportes La Serena, Coquimbo Unido, Palestino and Deportes Antofagasta.

At international level, he represented the Palestine national team in the 2004 AFC Asian Cup qualification.

== Post-retirement ==
After his retirement, he has performed as coach in the football academy of the Club Deportivo y Cultural Minas El Romeral from La Serena.
