= Shadi Shaban =

Palestinian footballer

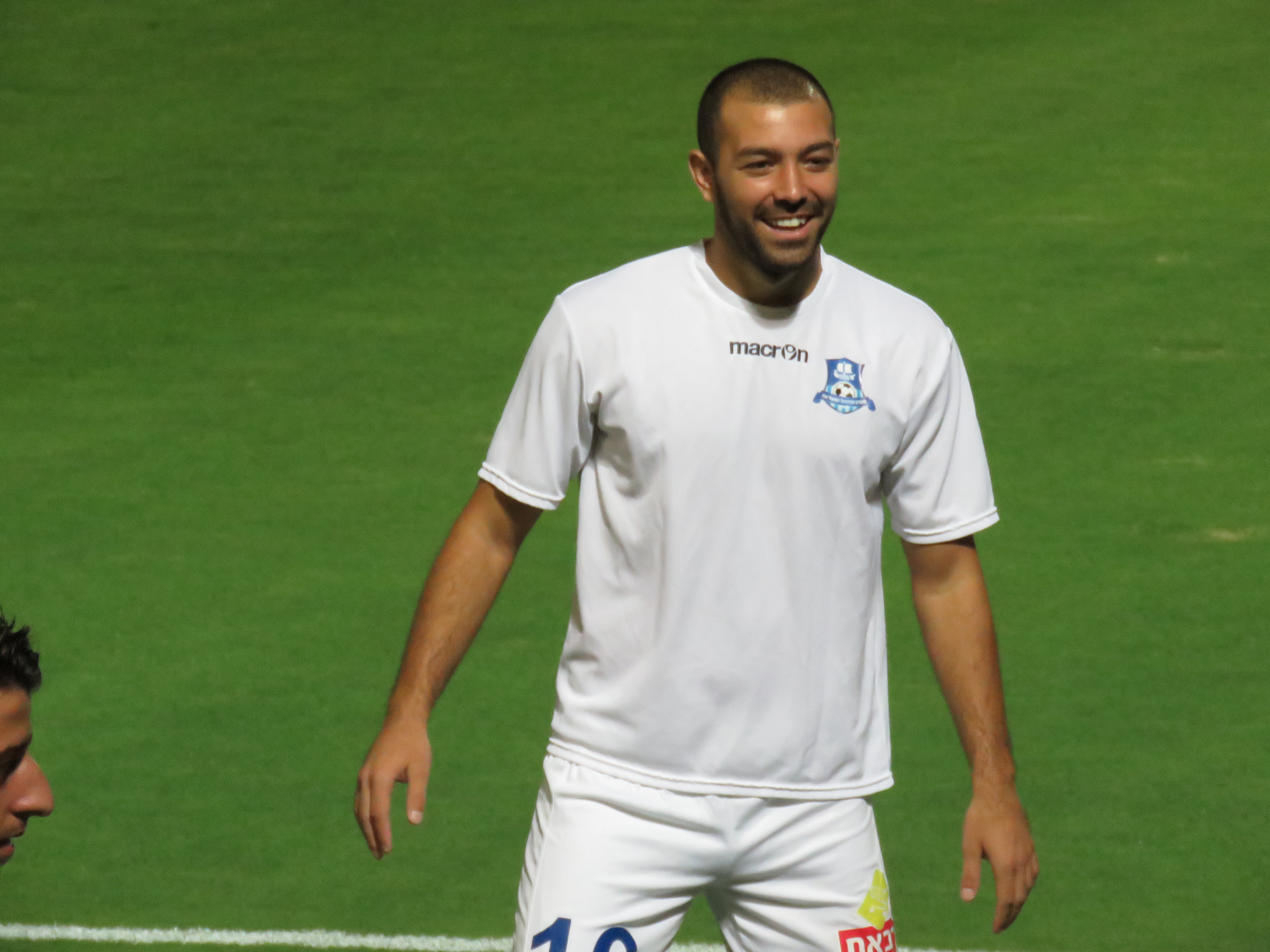
- Shaaban playing for Hapoel Acre in 2015

Personal information
- Full name: Shadi Shaban
- Date of birth: March 4, 1992 (age 34)
- Place of birth: Acre, Israel
- Height: 1.82 m (5 ft 11 1/2 in)
- Position: Midfielder

Youth career
- Maccabi Haifa

Senior career*
| Years | Team | Apps | (Gls) |
| 2010–2013 | Maccabi Haifa | 1 | (0) |
| 2012 | → Hapoel NRHS (loan) | 1 | (0) |
| 2012–2013 | → Hapoel BL (loan) | 11 | (2) |
| 2013–2015 | Hapoel Acre | 19 | (0) |
| 2016 | Ahli Al-Khaleel | | |
| 2016 | → Palestino (loan) | 0 | (0) |
| 2017–2020 | Ahli Al-Khaleel | | |
| 2020–2021 | Daburiyya | 4 | (0) |
| 2020–2021 | → Hapoel Kafr Kanna (loan) | 18 | (1) |

International career^{‡}
| 2007–2008 | Israel U-16 | 8 | (1) |
| 2008 | Israel U-17 | 1 | (0) |
| 2011 | Israel U-19 | 9 | (0) |
| 2010 | Israel U-21 | 1 | (0) |
| 2016–2021 | Palestine | 21 | (0) |
- * Club domestic league appearances and goals as of 7 May 2021 ‡ National team caps and goals as of 11 January 2019

Shadi Shaban (Arabic: شادي شعبان, Hebrew: שאדי שעבאן; born March 4, 1992) is a former footballer who played as a midfielder. Born in Israel, he played for the Palestine national team.

== Early life ==
Sha'aban was born in Acre, Israel, to an Arab-Israeli family of Palestinian descent.

== International career ==
Shaban represented Israel at youth level until 2010, before switching allegiance to the senior Palestine national team in 2016.
