= Felipe Massri =

Chilean footballer

Personal information
- Full name: Felipe Andrés Massri Antihuay
- Date of birth: 18 February 2002 (age 24)
- Place of birth: Santiago, Chile
- Height: 1.71 m (5 ft 7 in)
- Position: Midfielder

Team information
- Current team: Unión Española
- Number: 17

Youth career
- 2012–2022: Unión Española

Senior career*
Years	Team	Apps	(Gls)
2022–	Unión Española	50	(2)

International career^{‡}
2025–	Palestine	1	(0)
- * Club domestic league appearances and goals as of 11 March 2026 ‡ National team caps and goals as of 9 September 2025

Felipe Andrés Massri Antihuay (Arabic: فيليبي أندريس مصري أنتيهواي; born 18 February 2002) is a professional footballer who plays as a midfielder for Chilean club Unión Española. Born in Chile, he plays for the Palestine national team.

== Club career ==
A left-footed midfielder, Massri came to the Unión Española youth system at the age of ten and made his professional debut in the 1–0 win against O'Higgins on 21 August 2022 for the Copa Chile . At league level, he made his debut in the 0–1 loss against Deportes La Serena on 14 September of the same year as a starting player for the Chilean Primera División.

== International career ==
In 2022 and 2023, Massri took part in training microcycles and friendlies of the Chile national team at under-23 level.

Due to his origin, Massri was called up to the Palestine national team for the friendly match against Malaysia on 8 September 2025. He made his debut at the 89th minute by replacing Bader Mousa.

== Personal life ==
Born in Santiago de Chile, Massri is of Palestinian descent from his paternal great-grandfather.

His maternal surname, Antihuay, means "solar spear" in Mapuche language.
