= Edgardo Abdala =

Chilean-born Palestinian footballer (born 1978)

Personal information
- Full name: Edgardo Smith Abdala Montero
- Date of birth: July 1, 1978 (age 48)
- Place of birth: Monte Águila, Chile
- Position: Defensive midfielder

Team information
- Current team: Comunal Cabrero (manager)

Youth career
- 2000–2002: Fernández Vial

Senior career*
Years	Team	Apps	(Gls)
2003	Fernández Vial		
2004	Palestino	6	(0)
2004–2005	Naval		
2005–2006	Unión San Felipe	15	(0)
2006–2008	Ñublense	70	(6)
2009–2010	Huachipato	47	(1)
2011	Santiago Morning	20	(1)
2012	Fernández Vial	16	(2)

International career
2003–2008	Palestine	19	(1)

Managerial career
- 2016–2017: Fernández Vial
- 2017: Colegio Quillón
- 2018: Comunal Cabrero
- 2019: República Independiente Hualqui
- 2020–2021: Comunal Cabrero
- 2022–: Comunal Cabrero
- * Club domestic league appearances and goals

Edgardo Smith Abdala Montero (born July 1, 1978) is a former professional footballer who played as a midfielder. Born in Chile, he represented the Palestinian national team.

== Career ==
Abdala developed his career in Chile. A naturalized Palestinian, he represented the Palestinian national team from 2003 to 2008.

His last club was Fernández Vial in the 2012 Segunda División Profesional.

Abdala has developed a career as coach for teams at minor categories of the Chilean football. He started his career with Fernández Vial in 2016. In 2022, he returned to his hometown club, Comunal Cabrero, after leaving them at the beginning of 2021.

== Personal life ==
He is the father of the footballer Joaquín Abdala.
