= Ricardo Abumohor =

Chilean businessman

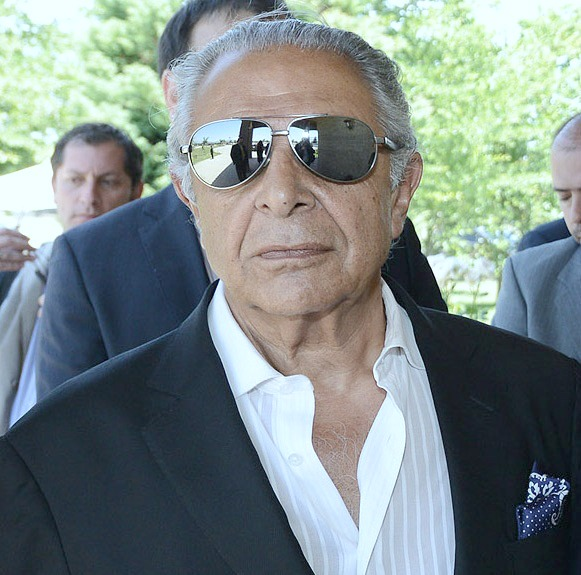
- Born: Ricardo Nicolás Abumohor Salman; 9 June 1942 (age 84); Chile
- Occupation: Businessman
- Known for: President and owner of O'Higgins

Ricardo Abumohor (Spanish pronunciation: [riˈkaɾðo aβumoˈoɾ]; born 9 June 1942) is a Chilean businessman of Palestinian origin, current owner of Primera División club O'Higgins since 2006. He also was the president of the ANFP for five years, when the Chilean national team during his period qualified for the 1998 FIFA World Cup held in France thanks to the coach Nelson Acosta.

== O'Higgins ==
=== First term ===
Abumohor bought the team to Codelco, having the Primera B title as principal objective for return to the Primera División, achieving also that objective, defeating 4–3 to Deportes Melipilla in the aggregate for the promotion with Hugo Brizuela and Mario Núñez as the key players of the success.

=== The titles ===
In 2012 Apertura, was runner-up with O'Higgins, after losing the final against Universidad de Chile in the penalty shoot-out.

In 2013, he won the Apertura 2013–14 with O'Higgins, being the first title in the history of the club, receiving with the coach Eduardo Berizzo the Llaves de la Ciudad de Rancagua by the Rancagua's alcalde Eduardo Soto. In 2014, he won the Supercopa de Chile against Deportes Iquique in the penalty shoot-out.

The club participated in the 2014 Copa Libertadores where they faced Deportivo Cali, Cerro Porteño and Lanús, being third and being eliminated in the group stage.

== Honours ==
=== Club ===
O'Higgins

- Primera División: Apertura 2013–14
- Supercopa de Chile: 2014

=== Individual ===
O'Higgins

- Llaves de la Ciudad de Rancagua: 2014

Preceded by Abel Alonso Sopelana	President of Anfp; 1993–1998	Succeeded by Mario Mosquera Ruíz
Preceded by Juan Carlos Latife	President of O'Higgins; 2006–present	Succeeded by Incumbent
