= Mohammed Al-Masri =

Palestinian footballer

Personal information
- Date of birth: October 8, 1981 (age 45)
- Place of birth: Kuwait City, Kuwait
- Height: 1.85 m (6 ft 1 in)
- Position: Central defender

Youth career
- 1993–1998: Al-Yarmouk FC

Senior career*
Years	Team	Apps	(Gls)
1998–2009	Al-Yarmouk FC		
2009–2010	Shabab Al-Ebadiyeh		
2010–2014	Shabab Al-Dhahrieh		
2014–2016	Dar Al-Dawa FC		

International career
2011	Palestine	7	(0)
- * Club domestic league appearances and goals

Mohammed Al-Masri (Arabic: محمد المصري; born October 8, 1981) is a former footballer. Born in Kuwait, he was first called up to the Palestine national team for their 2012 AFC Challenge Cup qualifying campaign. He received his first cap against Iran on October 5, 2011. He also represented Palestine at the 2011 Pan Arab Games.
