= Banco de Crédito e Inversiones =

Chilean bank

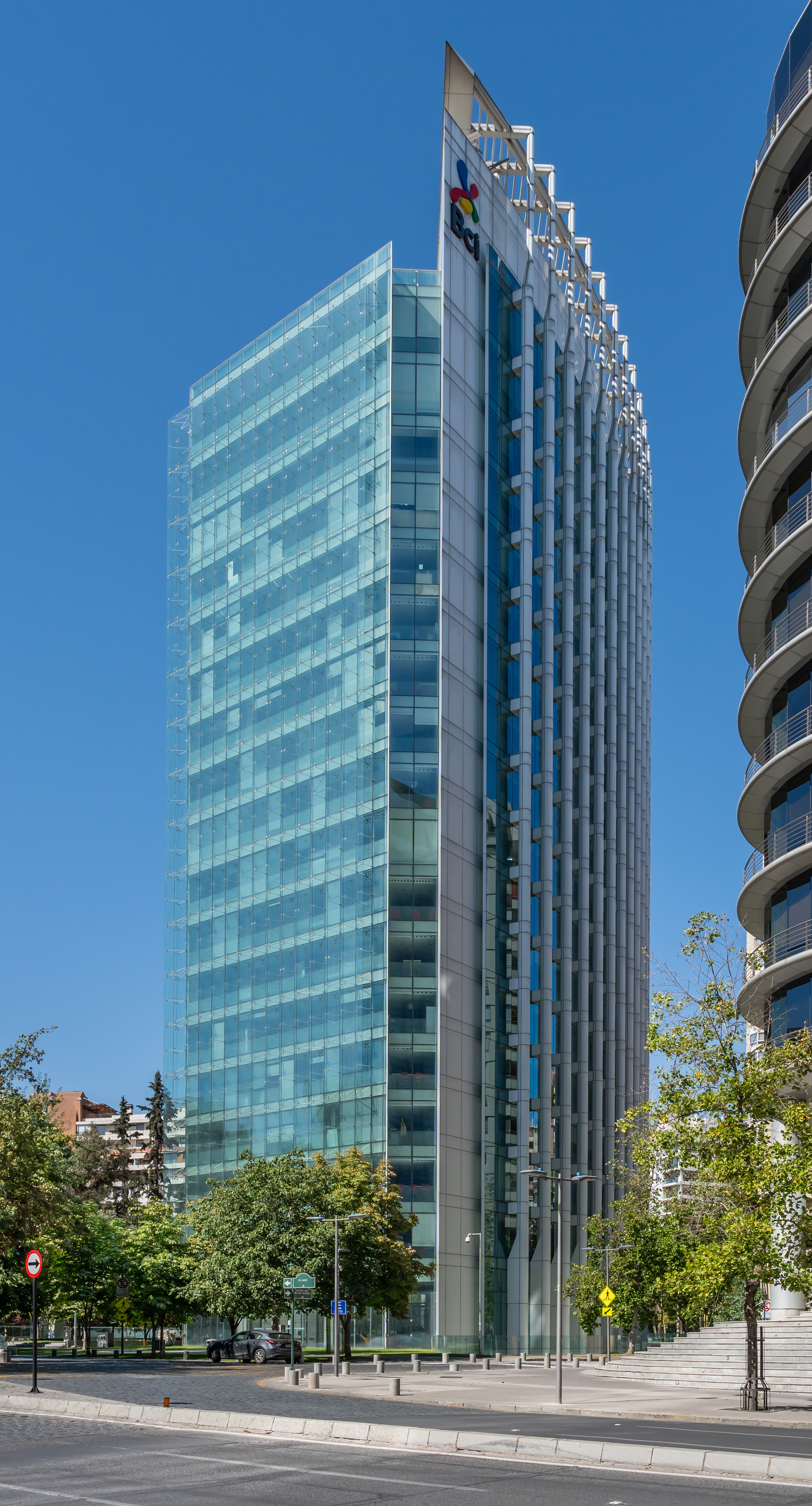
- Headquarters in Santiago de Chile.
- Type: Public
- Traded as: BCS: BCI
- Industry: Finance and Insurance
- Founded: 1937; 89 years ago
- Headquarters: Santiago, Chile
- Key people: Ignacio Yarur Arrasate, (Chairman); Eugenio Von Chrismar(CEO)
- Products: Banking
- Revenue: ▲US$ 3.1 billion (2017)
- Net income: ▲US$ 602.8 million (2017)
- Total assets: ▲US$ 54.0 billion (2018)
- Subsidiaries: City National Bank of Florida
- Website: www.bci.cl

The Banco de Crédito e Inversiones (BCI) is a Chilean bank specializing in savings & deposits, securities brokerage, asset management and insurance. BCI was the Latin American partner for Bear Stearns. BCI was formed and is still owned by the Yarur family.

== History ==
The Bank was founded in 1937 by Juan Yarur Lolas in order to support small and medium enterprises in Chile. His son, Jorge Yarur Banna, served as the second president until his death in 1991. Meanwhile, in 1970, a branch was bombed in Santiago. The current president, Luis Enrique Yarur Rey, is a third-generation member of the Yarur family.

BCI is a member of the International Confederation of Popular Banks (CIBP), international organization based in Brussels that brings together cooperative banks worldwide. Currently BCI is the third largest private bank in terms of loans and the fourth bank in number of customers, behind the privates Banco Santander, Chile and Banco de Chile, and the state Banco Estado.

In 2013 BCI purchased Miami, Florida based City National Bank of Florida for $882 million from Spanish lender Bankia. City National has 26 branches in South Florida and Orlando.
