= Jorge Yarur Banna =

- Born: December 24, 1918; Arequipa, Peru
- Died: October 17, 1991 (aged 72); Santiago, Chile
- Education: University of Chile
- Occupations: Lawyer, Banker
- Spouse: Raquel Bascuñán Cugnoni (m. 1958)
- Children: 1
- Relatives: Amador Yarur (brother)

Jorge Yarur Banna (24 December 1918 – 17 October 1991) was a Chilean banker and lawyer of Palestinian descent. He was the long-standing chairman of the Banco de Crédito e Inversiones (BCI), one of Chile's major financial institutions, and also served as president of the Chilean Association of Banks and Financial Institutions (ABIF).

== Early life and education ==
Jorge Yarur Banna was born in Arequipa, Peru, the second son of Palestinian immigrant Juan Yarur Lolas, a prominent industrialist, and Olombí Banna Alak. His older brother was Carlos Yarur and his younger brother was Amador Yarur. The Yarur family would become one of the most influential business dynasties in Chile.

He received his early education in Bolivia before the family settled in Santiago in 1934. There, he completed his secondary education at the Instituto Inglés. He went on to earn a law degree from the University of Chile.

== Career ==
=== Early career and leadership ===
After graduating, Yarur Banna practiced law while simultaneously entering the family business. At 25, he began working at the family's textile firm, Yarur S.A. (Manufacturas Chilenas de Algodón).

In 1953, he was appointed General Manager of the Banco de Crédito e Inversiones (BCI), which was founded and chaired by his father. Following his father's death in a car accident in 1954, Yarur Banna succeeded him as chairman of the bank and also assumed the presidency of Yarur S.A. Under his leadership, BCI underwent a period of significant expansion.

=== Political turmoil and expropriation ===
This growth was halted in the early 1970s during the socialist government of Salvador Allende. The Allende administration's Popular Unity coalition intervened in the banking sector and expropriated much of the textile industry, including the Yarur family assets. As a result, Yarur Banna became a staunch opponent of Allende's policies.

Following the 1973 military coup that overthrew Allende, the Yarur family sought to regain control of their enterprises. Yarur Banna successfully resumed the administration of BCI in August 1975.

=== Later career and ABIF presidency ===
Yarur Banna led BCI through the severe financial crisis of 1982–83, during which the bank, like many others, required government assistance. He served as president of the ABIF from April 1988 to July 1989, representing the banking industry during a critical period of Chile's economic recovery.

His final public act was a press conference on 17 October 1991, where he announced that BCI had fully repaid the debt it owed to the Central Bank of Chile from the 1982 crisis. He declared, "I leave the bank more solid and reliable than ever."

== Personal life and death ==
Yarur Banna married Raquel Bascuñán Cugnoni in 1958 after a long courtship. The couple had one son, Jorge Yarur Bascuñán, who later founded the Museo de la Moda (Fashion Museum) in Santiago.

Hours after his press conference on 17 October 1991, and following a celebration with bank staff, Yarur Banna suffered a fatal stroke. He was 72.

He was succeeded as chairman of BCI by his nephew, Luis Enrique Yarur.

Business positions
Preceded by Juan Yarur Lolas	Chairman of the Banco de Crédito e Inversiones; 1954–1991	Succeeded by Luis Enrique Yarur Rey
Preceded by Sergio Markmann Dimitstein	President of the Asociación de Bancos e Instituciones Financieras; 1988–1989	Succeeded by Adolfo Rojas Gandulfo
