= 220 (disambiguation) =

220 most commonly refers to:

- 220 (number), a number
- 220 AD, a year
- 220 BC, a year

220 may also refer to:

== Military ==
- 220 (Searchlight) Field Squadron, Royal Engineers, a squadron of the Royal Air Force
- No. 220 Squadron IAF, a fighter squadron of the Indian Air Force
- No. 220 Squadron RAF, a squadron of the Royal Air Force

== Music ==
- 220 (album), a 1996 instrumental album by Phil Keaggy
- 220 (EP), a 2018 extended play by Snoop Doog
- "220" (song), a 2008 song by t.A.T.u.
- 220 Kid (born 1989), an English record producer and DJ

== Places ==
- Area code 220, a telephone area code in Ohio, United States
- 220 Central Park South, a residential building in New York City, New York, United States
- 220 West 57th Street, a building in New York City, New York, United States
- 220th Street (Manhattan), a street in New York City, New York, United States
- 220 East 42nd Street, also known as Daily News Building, a skyscraper in New York City, New York, United States
- 220 East Illinois, also known as Optima Signature, a residential skyscraper in Chicago, Illinois, United States

== Science and technology ==
- 220 Stephania, a minor planet
- NGC 220, an open cluster

== Transportation ==
- Route 220 (MBTA), a bus route in Massachusetts, US
- List of highways numbered 220
- DAF LF, a 2001–present British light/medium duty truck, sold in the United States as the Peterbilt 220
- Mercedes-Benz 220 (disambiguation), multiple German automobile models

== Other uses ==
- UFC 220, a 2018 martial arts event in Boston, Massachusetts, United States
