= 3TV (Chile) =

Proposed Chilean television channel

- Country: Chile

Programming
- Language: Spanish

Ownership
- Owner: Grupo Copesa

History
- Launched: 2013; 13 years ago (aborted)

Availability

Terrestrial
- Santiago: Channel 22 (aborted)

3TV was a project for a Chilean over-the-air television network owned by Grupo Copesa, of businessman Álvaro Saieh. It took its name from La Tercera's online television channel: 3TV.

It tried to emphasize its programming on culture, entertainment and accurate information.

The proposal of the Saieh family's group was achieved following the acquisition of channel 22 in Santiago de Chile (now known as Televisión Regional de Chile).

Finally, on September 23, 2013, Copesa decided to suspend the project after multiple delays.

== History ==
In 2010, channel 22 of Santiago, at the time Más Canal 22, was acquired by Álvaro Saieh (Grupo Copesa), owner of the broadcasting holding Grupo Dial, newspapers La Tercera, La Cuarta, La Hora, El Diario de Concepción and magazines Paula y Que Pasa.

Alberto Luengo was appointed 3TV's news director Andrea Moletto, programming director. It was expected that the channel would start in mid-2013.

Initial expectations for the launch of the new channel were scheduled for April, later delayed to July, and then, to August 19. 3TV would eventually launch its official broadcasts in September, due to delays with the permits of the network's relay transmitters. The only negotiations that were resolved were with cable companies, however it wasn't known what frequencies it would be granted.

The channel promised a late show-styled afternoon talk show, Mi show, presented by Javiera Contador, who would also take part in the Chilean adaptation of the Israeli series In Treatment where Alfredo Castro was its lead. There was also going to be a comedy show based on current Chilean events, Vacaciones en Chernobyl, news service 3TV noticias with three daily editions presented by Marlén Eguiguren, Daniel Silva and Francisco Sagredo, as well as North American and European series.

Finally, and after several rumors, on September 23, 2013, the Copesa directorate led by Jorge Andrés Saieh confirmed the suspension of the project:

Grupo Copesa informs that it had decided to temporarily suspend the launch of its television channel 3TV. This decision was taken based on a profound market study, the conditions the industry is currently facing and the new challenges that digitalization implies.

We reiterate our conviction to continue our way to make Grupo Copesa the leading content production company in all formats, and turning it into the most modern media group of our country. We especially thank all of those who, with their dedication and compromise, relied on this project and worked to make it possible.

The investments in the monthly cost of the project exceeded CL$ 400 million between the two rented floors at Ciudad Empresarial (Huechuraba), the payments of 100 staff with undefined contracts, and the contract and leasing of technical camera implements on behalf of CNN Chile.

The abrupt interruption of the television project could have explanation in the financial crisis that affected the SMU group that year, which led to the sale of shares and properties with the final goal to save the family company. Finally, in August 2016, the Saieh group decided to let go of its over-the-air frequencies it owned (channels 27, 22, 56, 35 and 21 in Antofagasta, Santiago, Rancagua, Concepción and Temuco, respectively) to sell them CNC Inversiones (in April, it had already sold channel 57 of Valparaíso to Radio Carnaval).
