= Estela López García =

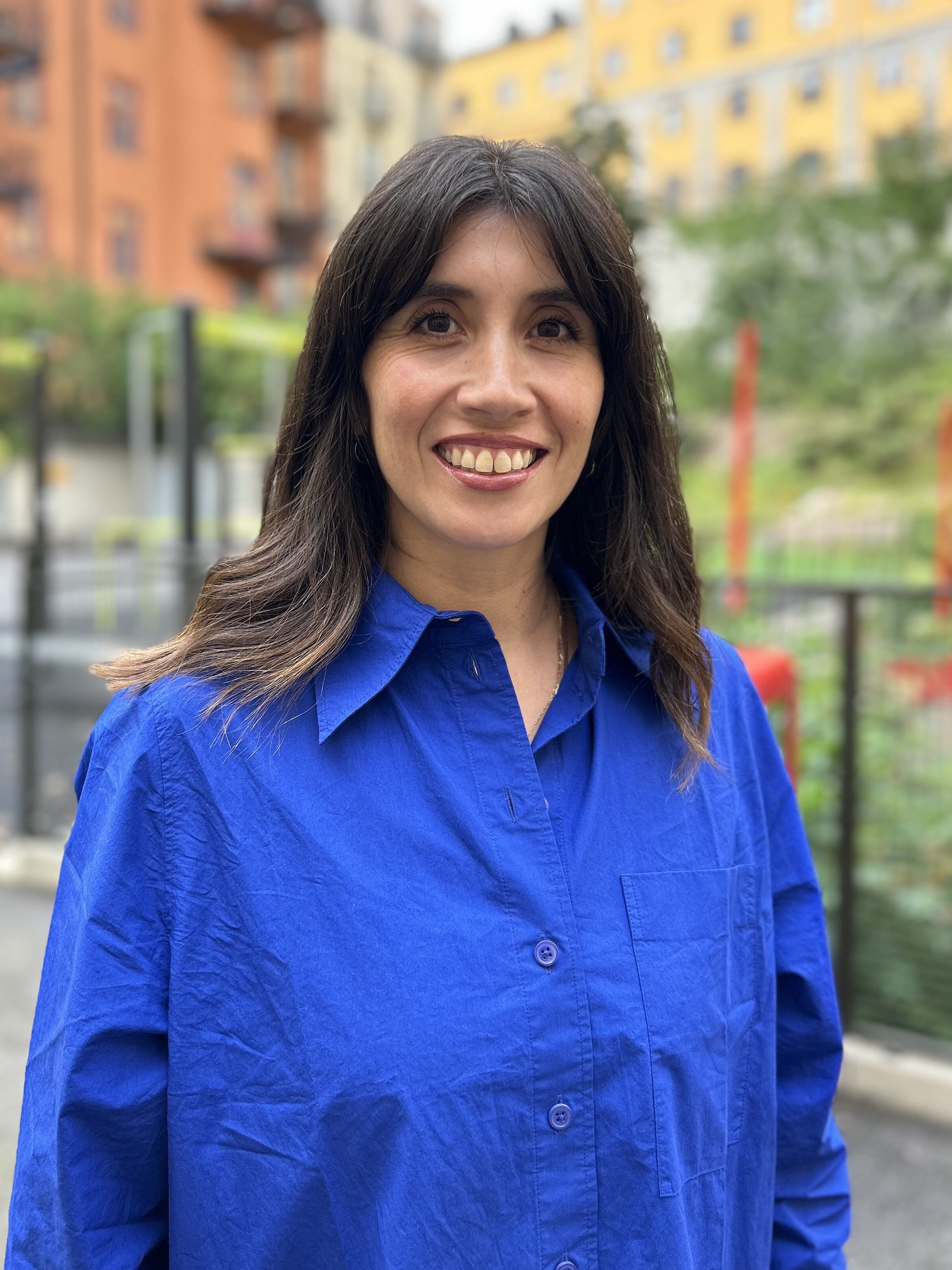
- Born: December 22, 1986 (age 39)
- Occupation: journalist

Estela López García (born December 22, 1986) is a finance journalist.

== Early life and education ==
Estela López García was born in Santiago, Chile. She attended Colegio José Luis Lagrange before pursuing a bachelor's degree in journalism and political science from the Universidad Diego Portales in Santiago and Pompeu Fabra University in Barcelona, Spain. She furthered her education with a Master's in creative writing from the Barcelona School of Management from August 2018 to June 2019.

== Career ==
In 2005–2006, she was in charge of the communications and public relations area of the Federación Ecuestre de Chile.

Between 2006 and 2011, she worked as a journalist and photographer for Desarrollos Inmobiliarios y Constructora Valle Grande S.A. in Santiago.

In 2010, she joined the journalistic team of the international news network CNN Chile. She was part of the team that reported during the first hours after the 2010 Chile earthquake.

After two years at CNN Chile, she was selected for an internship at the Organization of American States (OAS) in Washington, D.C., where she collaborated on cross-border projects within the Strategic Communications and Press Department.

Returning to Chile, López transitioned to the financial sector in mid-2012, becoming part of the founding team of the economic newspaper Pulso, later merging with La Tercera.

After Pulso, she served as communications director at Junaeb, a Chilean state agency focused on economic and social support for vulnerable children. During her time at Junaeb, she led the "Plan Against Student Obesity" with the aim of bringing this issue to the public agenda. The program, now named "Contrapeso," receives state funding and is implemented in all public schools in Chile.

After navigating through a period of crisis at Junaeb, López returned to print media as a senior journalist at Revista Qué Pasa, part of the Copesa media conglomerate.

In 2018 Estela López received a scholarship from the UPF Barcelona School of Management to complete a master's degree in Creative Writing in Spain, so she moved to live there.

She was a freelance journalist for various publications during her postgraduate studies, including The Clinic, Media.cat, and Revista Paula.

In 2020, López relocated to Stockholm, Sweden, joining the editorial team at Diet Doctor, a nutrition company.

In mid-2023, she became part of the editorial team at Haveton and is the head writer of the Spanish finance site Finanzasjustas.com and reviewer of financial articles at the Scandinavian finance sites Finansvalp.se and Finansplassen.no.

In 2023, she participated in the presentation at the Cervantes Institute in Stockholm of the biographies of Salvador Allende and Victor Jara.
