= Optima (disambiguation) =

Optima is a typeface.

Optima may also refer to:

== Arts, media, and entertainment ==
- Optima (EP), a 1996 EP by Christ Analogue
- Optima, the newsletter of the Mathematical Optimization Society

== Businesses and organizations ==
- Optima bank, a bank company in Greece
- Optima Bus Corporation, a former United States bus manufacturer
- Optima Telekom, a telecommunications operator in Croatia
- Optima, a convenience store operated by Sunoco at Wal-Mart stores
- Optima, a series of automotive batteries produced by Johnson Controls
- Optima Card, a revolving credit card issued by American Express from 1987 to 2009
- Optima Health, a managed-care plan by Sentara Healthcare
- Televisión Regional de Chile, a private terrestrial television channel in Chile, formerly known as Televisión Óptima from 2005 to 2006

== Places ==
- Optima, Oklahoma, United States, a town
  - Optima Lake
  - Optima National Wildlife Refuge
- Optima Signature, a residential skyscraper in Chicago, Illinois, United States

== Vehicles ==
- Optima, a barque that wrecked in 1905
- Eagle Optima, an American mid-size concept sedan
- Kia Optima, a Korean sedan
- Passport Optima, a Korean compact car marketed in Canada
- Opel Optima, a hatchback marketed in Indonesia

== Other uses ==
- Optima (grape), a German white wine grape

== See also ==
- Optimal
