= Pubblico =

- Type: Daily newspaper
- Format: Berliner
- Owner: Pubblico Edizioni s.r.l.
- Editor: Luca Telese
- Founded: 18 September 2012
- Ceased publication: 31 December 2012
- Political alignment: Progressivism, Left-wing politics
- Language: Italian
- Headquarters: Rome, Italy
- Website: pubblicogiornale.it

Pubblico was an Italian daily newspaper briefly published in Italy between September and December 2012.

== History ==
Pubblico was first published on 18 September 2012. The founders were Luca Telese who was also its editor and a group of fellow journalists. The paper was a full-colour left-wing publication. The graphics and logo of the paper were similar to French paper Libération. Pubblico's slogan was "Not funded by public money".

Following the launch the publication failed to reach to break-even of an average of 9600 copies sold, and the publisher went immediately in financial difficulties. After a failed attempt to recapitalize the publisher company in order to save it, Pubblico ceased the publication on 31 December 2012.

== Editorial staff ==
=== Editors ===
- Luca Telese (2012)

=== Columnists ===
- Luca Telese
- Federico Mello
- Manolo Fuce
- Francesca Fornario
- Stefania Podda
- Stella Prudente
- Fabio Luppino
- Roberto Brunelli
- Tommaso Labate
- Ritanna Armeni
- Giancarlo Padovan
- Corrado Formigli
