= A220 (disambiguation) =

The Airbus A220 (formerly Bombardier CSeries) is a narrow-body airliner.

A220 may also refer to:

- Aerotrek A220, light sport aircraft, two-seater taildragger
- Alpine A220, sportscar racing prototype
- A220, model of Mercedes-Benz A-Class cars
- A220 road, between Erith and Bexleyheath in the UK
- RFA Wave Victor (A220), a Wave-class fleet support tanker

== See also ==
- List of highways numbered 220
- Mercedes-Benz 220 (disambiguation)
- 220 (number) and related terms
