= Televisión Regional de Chile =

Television station in Santiago, Chile

- Santiago; Chile
- Channels: Analog: 22 (UHF, Santiago); Digital: 14.1 (Santiago); 14.2 (Antofagasta)

Ownership
- Owner: CNC Medios

History
- First air date: October 9, 1995
- Former names: Gran Santiago Televisión (1995–2000); Andrés Bello Televisión (2000–2005); Televisión Óptima (2005–2006); +Más Canal 22 (2006–2011); Más Visión (2011–2016); Canal 22 (2016–2018)

Links
- Website: tvr.cl

Televisión Regional de Chile (TVR) is a private terrestrial television channel in Chile which broadcasts to Santiago and Antofagasta.

== History ==
In 1994, lawyer and radio personality Enrique Evans Espiñeira, economic analyst Gonzalo Chamorro Oschilewsky, and José Artemio Espinosa Martínez received the first ever UHF television concession in Chile. The station went on the air October 9, 1995, as Gran Santiago Televisión. The station suffered in its early years from an underpowered signal that failed to cover the entire Santiago Metropolitan Region and from being the only operating UHF outlet in the country. The founders brought with them their programming: Evans Espiñeira's radio show "Gente de Mundo" migrated to television, while Chamorro's business program, "La Bolsa de Comercio a sus Órdenes", moved from UCV TV. Espinosa Martínez would later become a priest.

In 1998, the station moved its transmitter from its studios at Praga 555 to San Cristóbal Hill. Two years later, five of the controllers of the private Andrés Bello National University, who already owned 20 percent of the station, bought the remainder for $1 million and rebranded the channel as Andrés Bello Televisión (ABT). The university built modern studios for the station in the Lo Barnechea area. However, the improvements failed to attract increased viewership. ABT's programming mostly consisted of classic films, Canal Vasco programs, and infomercials. One of its few programming coups was airing the short-lived exclusive soccer highlight program "Fútbol Total", alongside UCV, as part of the rights shakeup that launched CDF.

Entertainment magnate Bernardo Carrasco acquired Andrés Bello Televisión in 2005, rebranding the station as Televisión Óptima (TVO) and making waves with several notable talent signings. However, many of them ended in surprise exits, most notably when Pamela Jiles was fired by TVO for appearing in a presidential campaign advertisement—all while the channel touted its "pluralist" and "tolerant" editorial stance. Programs on TVO included Estrictamente para mayores, a strand of adult movies, and a program hosted by Eduardo Bonvallet that was constantly mocked on Caiga Quien Caiga.

After just a year, Carrasco sold the station to Pabellón de la Construcción, a real estate showroom, which bought TVO for $2.5 million plus an additional $1.5 million investment in equipment, relaunching it as "Más Canal". Few viewers took notice, and the station typically only made news for business reasons, including layoffs and budget cuts. A low point came in 2008, when national cable operator VTR dropped Más Canal from its systems to make way for a Christian channel.

=== Copesa and failed 3TV project ===
In July 2010, Álvaro Saieh, the 20 percent owner of VTR and media conglomerate Copesa, acquired Más Canal for $2.5 million. It was the second major media acquisition for Saieh that year, as he had only bought the VTR stake in January; he also owned La Tercera newspaper and several radio stations.

In 2013, Copesa made preparations to relaunch channel 22, which it had renamed "Más Visión", as "3TV", with national ambitions. It had bought several television station concessions outside of Santiago to support this launch, while 150 employees had been hired and studios were being prepared. However, financial problems within the group caused the venture to be scuttled before it signed on the air.

=== CNC Medios ownership ===
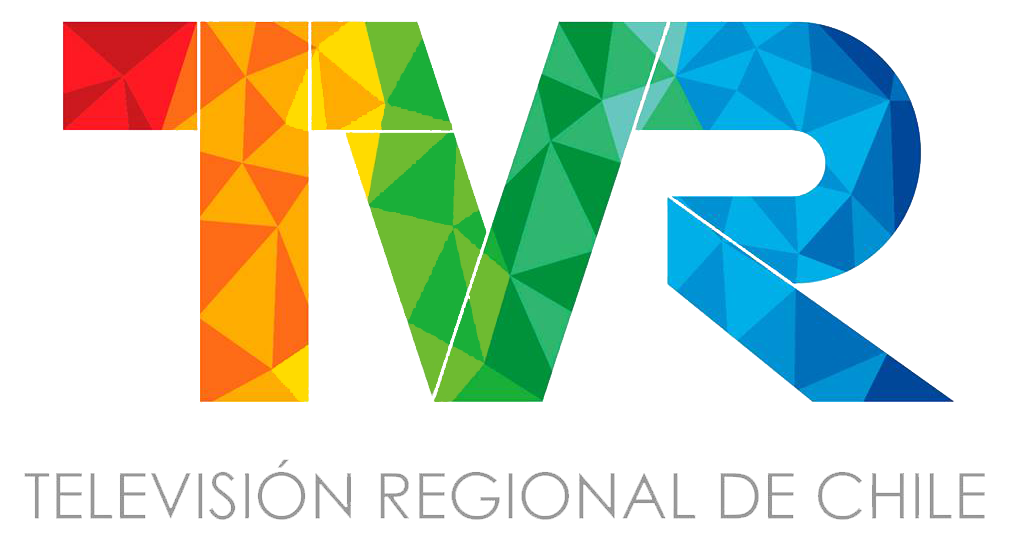
Logo used until June 6, 2025

In 2016, Copesa announced that it would sell most of its television station holdings to CNC Inversiones, an Antofagasta-based group headed by Marcelo Mendizábal; this included Canal 22 and channels 21 in Temuco and 35 in Concepción.

On February 1, 2018, Canal 22 changed its name to the present Televisión Regional de Chile and began broadcasting digitally on channel 14.1.

== See also ==
- List of television stations in Chile
