= NGC 231 =

Open cluster in the constellation Tucana

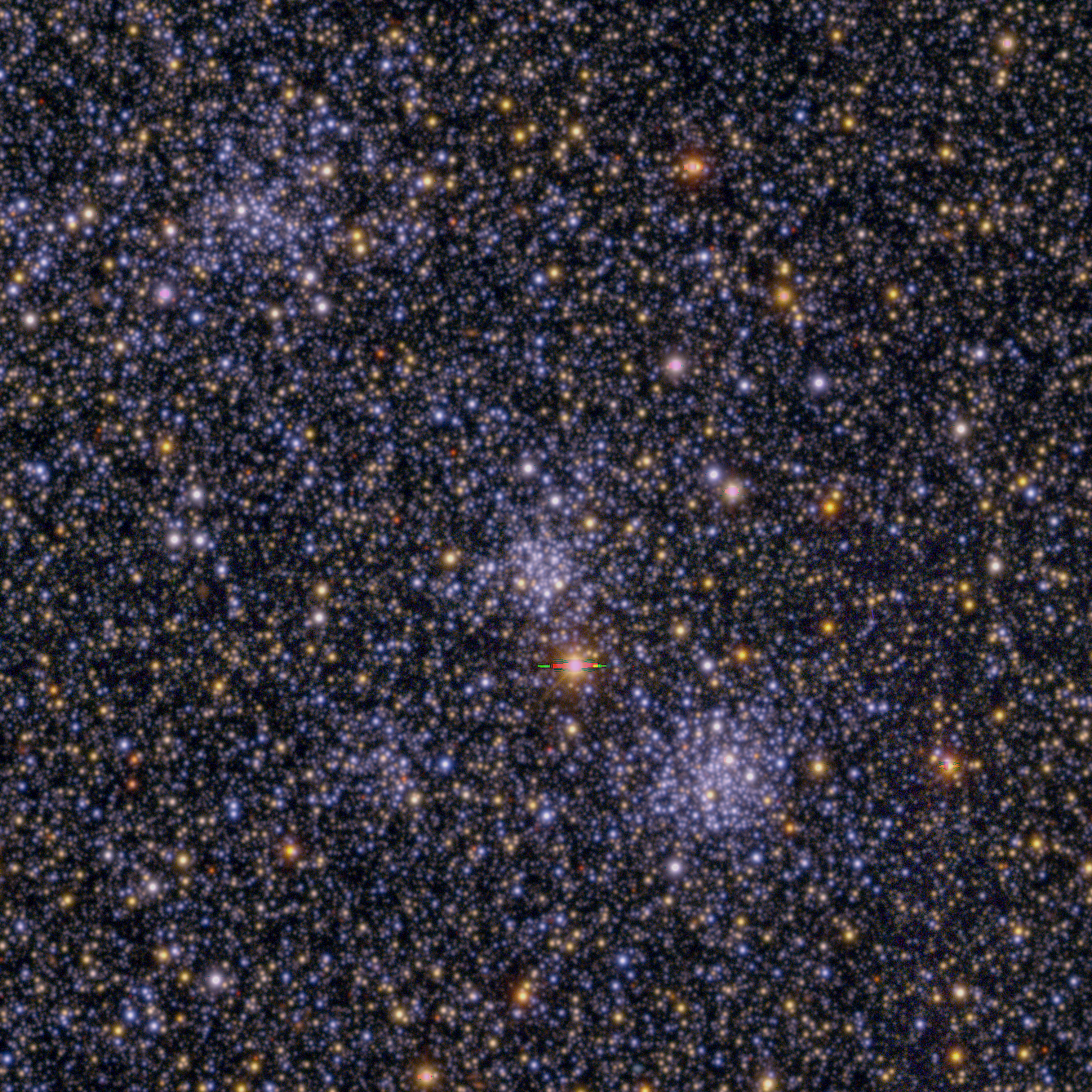
- NGC 220 (lower right), NGC 222 (middle) and NGC 231 (upper left) with DECam

Observation data (J2000 epoch)
- Right ascension: 00^{h} 41^{m} 06.4^{s}
- Declination: −73° 21′ 09″
- Distance: ~210000
- Apparent magnitude (V): 12.87
- Apparent dimensions (V): 1.8′ × 1.8′

Physical characteristics
- Mass: 6.9×10^{3} M_{☉}
- Estimated age: 87 Myr
- Other designations: ESO 029-SC 005.

Associations
- Constellation: Tucana

NGC 231 is an open cluster in the Small Magellanic Cloud. It is located in the constellation Tucana. It was discovered on August 1, 1826 by James Dunlop.
