= NGC 222 =

Open cluster in the constellation Tucana

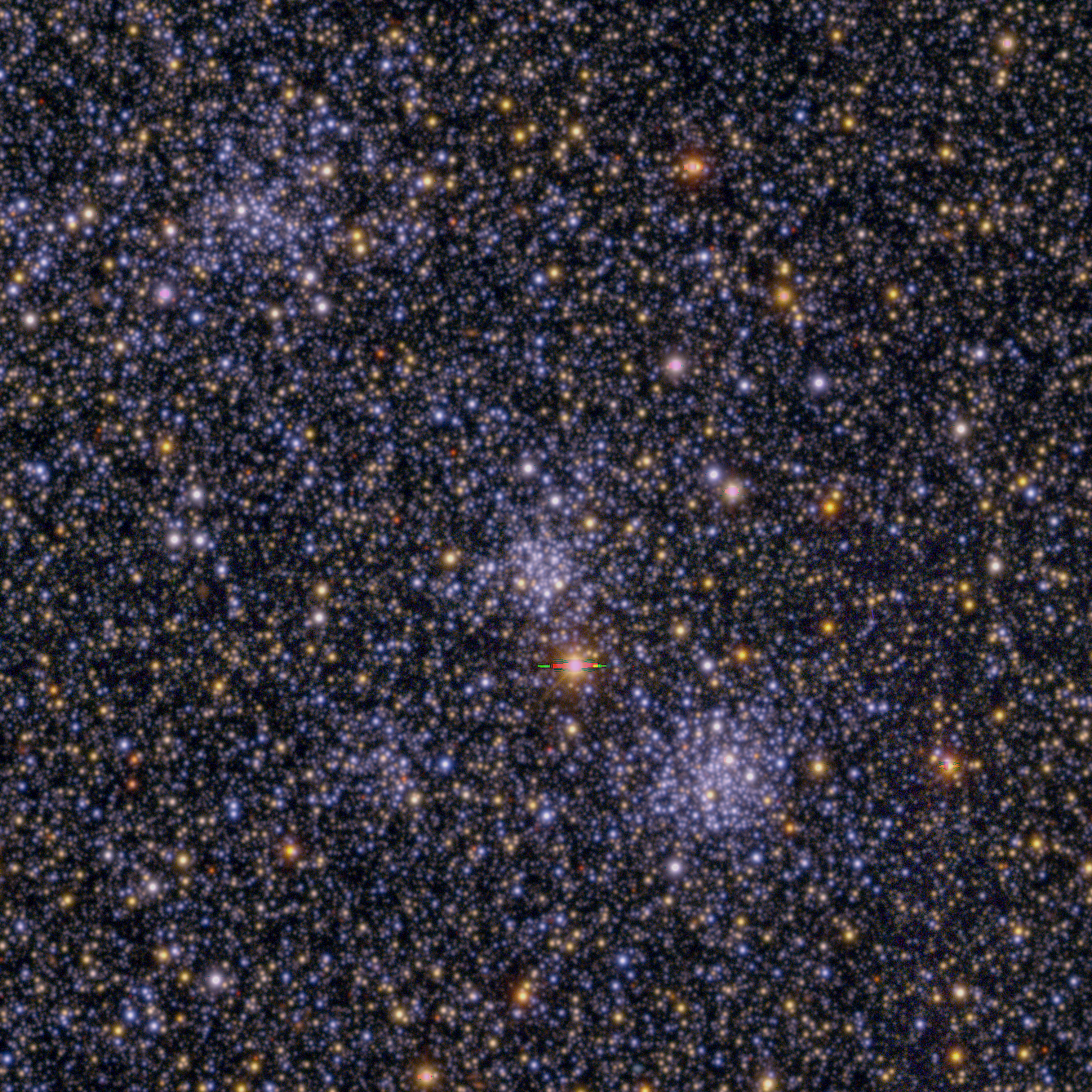
- NGC 220 (lower right), NGC 222 (middle) and NGC 231 (upper left) with DECam

Observation data (J2000 epoch)
- Right ascension: 00^{h} 40^{m} 43.7^{s}
- Declination: −73° 23′ 08″
- Distance: 210000 ly
- Apparent magnitude (V): 12.64
- Apparent dimensions (V): 1.2′ × 1.2′

Physical characteristics
- Mass: 6.2×10^{3} M_{☉}
- Estimated age: 83 Myr
- Other designations: ESO 029-SC 004.

Associations
- Constellation: Tucana

NGC 222 is an open cluster located approximately 210,000 light-years from the Sun in the Small Magellanic Cloud. It is located in the constellation Tucana. It was discovered on August 1, 1826 by James Dunlop.

== See also ==
- List of NGC objects (1–1000)
