= Acoustic Sketches =

Studio album by Phil Keaggy
- Released: 1996
- Genre: Acoustic music; Instrumental
- Length: 62:27
- Label: Sparrow
- Producer: Phil Keaggy; John Schroeter

Phil Keaggy chronology
True Believer (1995)	Acoustic Sketches (1996)	220 (1996)

Professional ratings
Review scores
Source	Rating
Allmusic	3/5 stars

Acoustic Sketches is an album by guitarist Phil Keaggy, released in 1996. Most pieces are performed on solo guitar.

== Track listing ==
All songs were written by Phil Keaggy, unless otherwise noted.

1. "Metamorphosis" - 4:54
2. "Rivulets" - 3:00
3. "Nellie's Tune" - 3:26
4. "Passing Thought" - 1:33
5. "The Marionette" - 3:51
6. "Del's Bells" - 1:33
7. "Looking Back" - 0:40
8. "Paka" - 2:58
9. "Spend My Life With You" - 5:56
10. "Jam in the Pocket" - 4:12
11. "Swing Low, Sweet Chariot" (Traditional) - 3:21
12. "The 50th" - 7:03
13. "Morning Snow" - 3:18
14. "Spanish Fantasy" - 1:51
15. "On Some Distant Shore" - 5:07
16. "Icicles" - 2:20
17. "On Second Thought" - 2:33
18. "Griegarious" - 0:16
19. "Legacy - 5:26

== Personnel ==
- Phil Keaggy – acoustic guitars

With:

- Del Langeians – additional guitars (1, 2, 4, 6, 9, 12, 13, 15-18)
- James Olson – additional guitars (3, 5, 7, 8, 10, 11, 14, 19)
- Paul McGill – resonator guitar (7)

=== Production ===
- Phil Keaggy – producer
- John Schroeter – producer, digital remastering
- Tom Gregor – digital remastering
- Startsong Studios (Colorado Springs, Colorado) – remastering location
- Ed Rother – art direction
- Ben Pearson – photography
- Proper Management – management
