= Los Galos =

Chilean pop band

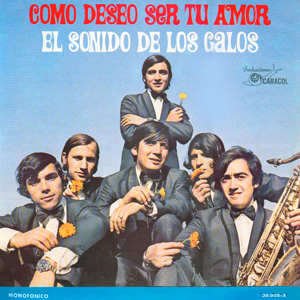
Los Galos.

Los Galos (English: The Gauls) were a Chilean pop music band that became widely known in Latin America in the 1970s with their romantic electrified ballads.

== History ==
Los Galos was formed by former members of a student band, Los Douglas, formed in 1963. Their distinctive sound, derived from a fusion of the American, British and Latin American pop music of their time, first acquired nationwide notoriety in Chile and Argentina with the release of their album and their first hit: “Como deseo ser tu amor” in 1970. A string of hit recordings followed including, ¿Qué esperas de mí?, Un Minuto De Tu Amor, and Perdona Si Me Ves Llorar which established them alongside Los Ángeles Negros as one of the most popular music groups of the 1970s - in Chile, Argentina, and other Latin American countries. Their first lead vocalist, Lucho Muñoz, left the band in 1974 and was replaced by Humberto Salse (Vadim).

Early in their career, the band was involved in a serious road accident while on tour, which led to some members leaving the group and sparked rumours that some had died.

== Members ==
- Leo Núñez – Musical Director / Trumpet
- Jorge Deij Molina - Keyboards
- Roberto Zúñiga – Group Director / Drums
- Eladio Farías - Bass
- Juan Suazo – Guitar
- Nicolás Parra - Saxophone
- Carlos Peña – Vocals
- Mario Darigo - Trumpet

== Discography ==
=== Albums ===
- Tu nombre al viento (1969)
- Como deseo ser tu amor (1970)
- El sonido de los galos (1971)
- Historia de un amor (1972)
- No quiero estar esta noche sin ti (1972)
- Entrega total (1973)
- Te extraño tanto amor (1974)
- La Magia Terminó (1974)
- De Boca en Boca (1976)
- Te quiero cada día más (1979)
