= Shanghai SH760 =

Fenghuang (Phoenix)/; Shanghai SH760
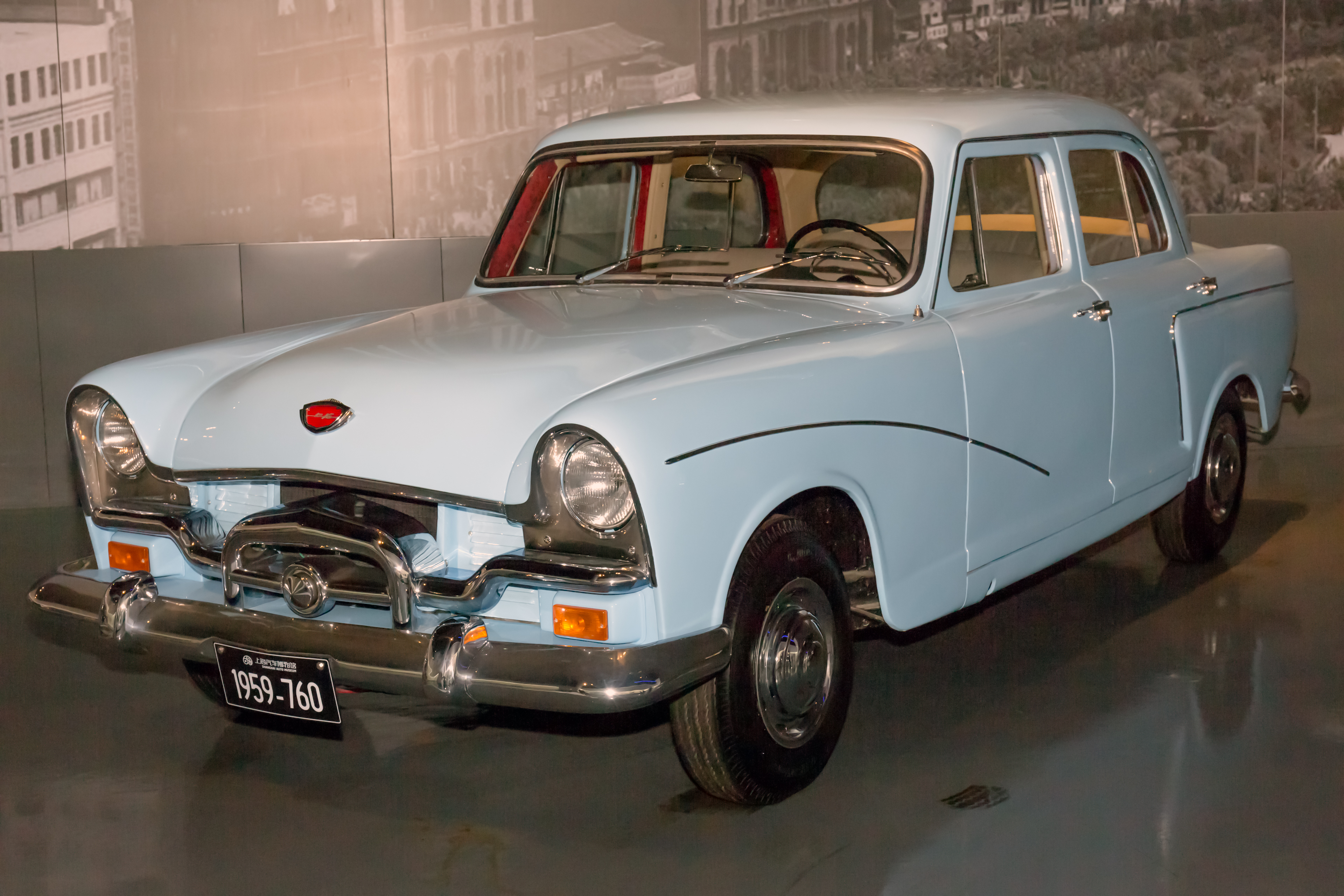
- 1964 Shanghai SH760

Overview
- Manufacturer: Shanghai City Power Machinery Manufacturing Company; (now SAIC Motor)
- Also called: Shanghai SH7221 (1989–1991)
- Production: 1964–1991
- Model years: 1965–1991
- Assembly: China: Shanghai

Body and chassis
- Class: Executive car
- Body style: 4-door sedan 4-door coupe utility 2-door coupe utility
- Layout: FR layout
- Related: Mercedes-Benz W180

Powertrain
- Engine: 2.2 L Jinfeng 680Q I6 (SH760/SH760A); 2.3 L Jinfeng 682Q I6 (SH760B)
- Transmission: 4-speed manual

Dimensions
- Wheelbase: 2,830 mm (111 in)
- Length: 4,780 mm (188 in)
- Width: 1,775 mm (69.9 in)
- Height: 1,585 mm (62.4 in)
- Kerb weight: 1,440 kg (3,170 lb)

Chronology
- Successor: Shanghai-Volkswagen Santana

The Shanghai SH760 is a car produced in China from 1965 to 1991 primarily for government officials not important enough to warrant a FAW Hongqi and as a taxi. The design was based on the Mercedes-Benz 220S (W180) from 1954, with modified front and rear styling to resemble an American Packard of the same era such as the Patrician 1955 model.

Originally built by the Shanghai City Agricultural Machinery Manufacturing Company, this became STAC (Shanghai Tractor and Automobile Corporation) in April 1969. The company changed its name to SATIC (Shanghai Automobile and Tractor Industry Corporation) in the mid-1980s and became SAIC in 1990.

Unlike Beijing-controlled FAW and SAW (now Dongfeng Motor), STAC was owned directly by the city of Shanghai.

== Development ==
The Shanghai Automobile assembly line produced its first prototype on 28 September 1958, called Fenghuang (meaning Phoenix in English). It was based on a 1957 FSO Warszawa and was powered by a 2.1 liter Nanjing NJ050 four-cylinder engine, itself a copy of the Soviet Pobeda M20 engine. The Phoenix models are distinguished by round headlights and fins to the rear. The front end and overall body resembled the American 1955-1956 Packard Patrician and 1956 Plymouth Savoy models.

A second Phoenix prototype was produced in January 1959, now with quad headlights. The car was powered by a 150 horsepower V8 for a top speed of 120 km/h (75 mph), but other sources mentioned that the engine was the new Nanjing CN070, a 3.5 liter inline-six that produced around 70 horsepower. The styling was similar to the 1958 Plymouth.

The third prototype, named the Jiaotong, was produced in November 1959 and returned to dual headlights. The grille design featured two dragons incorporated into it, as well as new hood ornaments. This prototype was probably powered by a V8 engine.

The final Phoenix prototype was now based on the Mercedes-Benz 220 (W180) instead of the FSO Warszawa, otherwise the styling was similar to the first prototype. In the summer of 1959, the production version of the Phoenix was released. Very few Phoenix models were produced.

In December 1964, a modified Phoenix changed its name to Shanghai SH760, and was in full production. A mere fifty cars were built in 1964, but by the mid-seventies factory capacity stood at 5,000 per annum. The SH760 was powered by the Jinfeng (Golden Phoenix) 680Q, a 2.2 litre straight-six engine developing 90 bhp (67 kW; 91 PS) and coupled with a four-speed manual gearbox. As with the basis of the bodywork, this was a copy of 1950s Mercedes-Benz mechanicals, although the engine was OHV instead of OHC. Construction was by hand, with old-fashioned methods and on a small scale.

A 1985 visitor described the process as chaotic, with many body parts rusting before they were even painted - but since the metal was so thick, this was not an issue, as they would still easily outlast the engine and transmission.

== Variants ==
=== SH760A ===
In 1974, the fully redesigned SH760A was released. More modern front and rear end design replacing the 1950s styling of the SH760, although the center section was still taken from the same Mercedes-Benz model. The powertrain was carried over from the SH760. Air conditioning was developed and approved in 1983, but did not become available until 1988 with the SH760B.

Production continued until around 1989 with some 49,000 units produced.

=== SH760B ===
Development on a SH760A replacement, the SH760B, was complete by 1980, but the car and its new engine were not available until 1988, after passing evaluation tests in 1987. The SH760B was powered by the Jinfeng 682Q, a new enlarged 2.3 liter version of the 680Q producing 100 horsepower. The model is sold with the SH760A.

Two versions were available; one was basically the SH760A but with a black plastic grille, while the other version featured trim, bumpers, taillights (somewhat modified), steering wheel, mirrors, wheels, and some interior trim pieces straight from the Volkswagen Santana, even though this was in direct contradiction to Shanghai's contract with Volkswagen. The SH760B was produced until 1989 alongside the SH760A.

=== SH760C/D ===
By the 1980s, the Shanghai SH760 had become increasingly outdated and production volumes and sales started to decline in favor of the new Shanghai-VW Santana. As production of the Shanghai SH760 saloon was to soon end, the company thought that they could use the tooling of the large, reliable, and durable car for a pick-up truck. It would be available as both a single, extended and double cab. An ambulance was also to be built. These prototypes were built in cooperation with a British company. Small scale production started in 1986. After 1991, when saloon production ended, the production of the pick-up trucks was moved to another factory of the company named Shanghai Engine Works which then became known as Shanghai Shenlian Special Purpose Vehicle Works. The single cab prototype was known as the SH760C. This truck used the 2.0 liter 4-cylinder engine from the Ford Sierra which was in made in case the vehicle was to be exported in South-East Asia, the Middle East and South America. Later on when production started the single cab was renamed as the SQ110, and received a locally built 2.3 liter 6-cylinder petrol engine from the Shanghai saloons. The extended cab prototype was known as the SH760D. Later on when production started the extended cab was renamed as the SQ110A. In 1990 two new versions of the extended cab pickup appeared, all sold as the SH1020SP. They were initially produced by Shanghai Auto Works and later by Shanghai Shenlian Special Auto Works. A double cab version eventually entered production in 1991. The Shanghai SH1021SP was a further modified variant. It was a variant of the double-cab pick-up truck but with most exterior components now taken from the VW Santana. Only 6,000 pick-up trucks were produced until production ended in 1994. Interestingly, Volkswagen Brazil in the 1990s also built a Volkswagen Santana-based pick-up truck using the bed of the Volkswagen Taro, but this did not enter production.

=== SH7221/SH7231 ===
In 1989, China's automotive designation system changed and the SH760A and SH760B were redesignated as SH7221 and SH7231, respectively, but otherwise remained identical to the previous models.

Production ended on 25 November 1991, after a total production run of 79,526 cars of all SH760s and derivatives. Production peaked in 1984 at around 6,000 units.

The SH760 was used as a basis for a four-door convertible, a three-door pickup truck from 1991 to 1994, and a five-door station wagon. Few of these mostly handmade derivatives were produced.

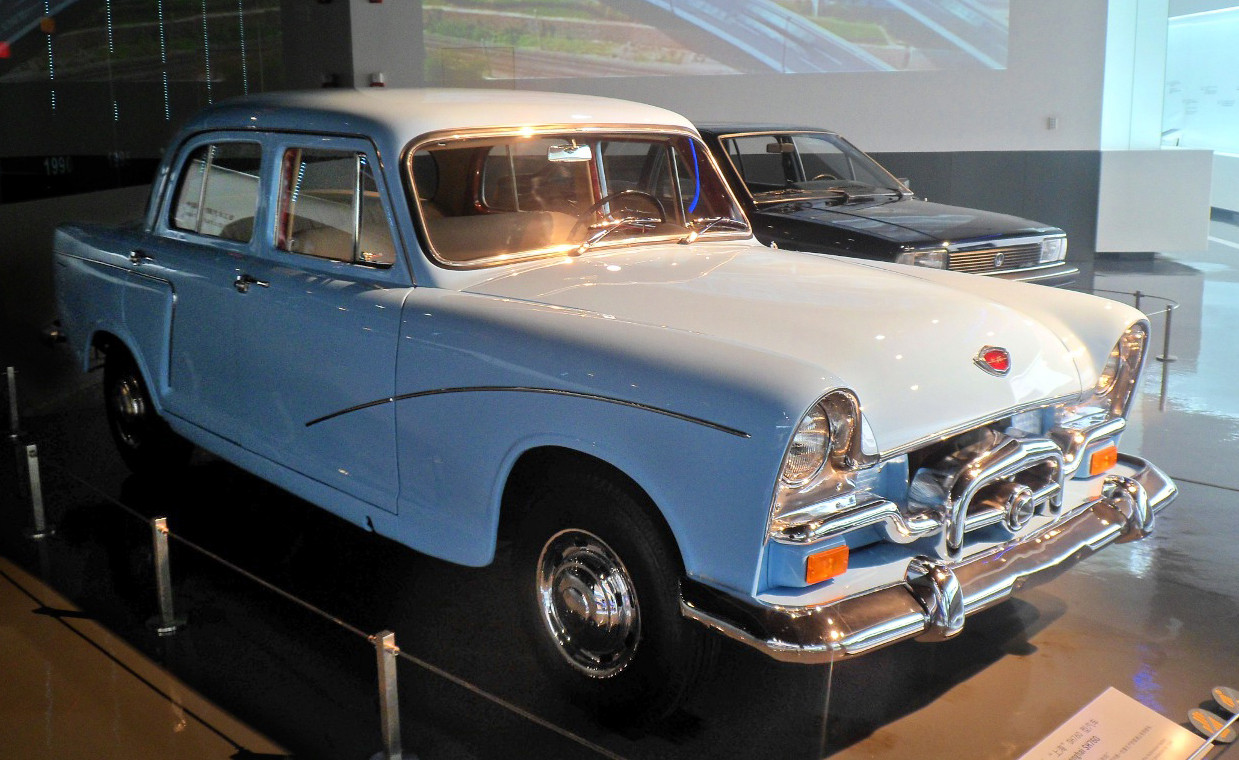
1964 Shanghai SH760

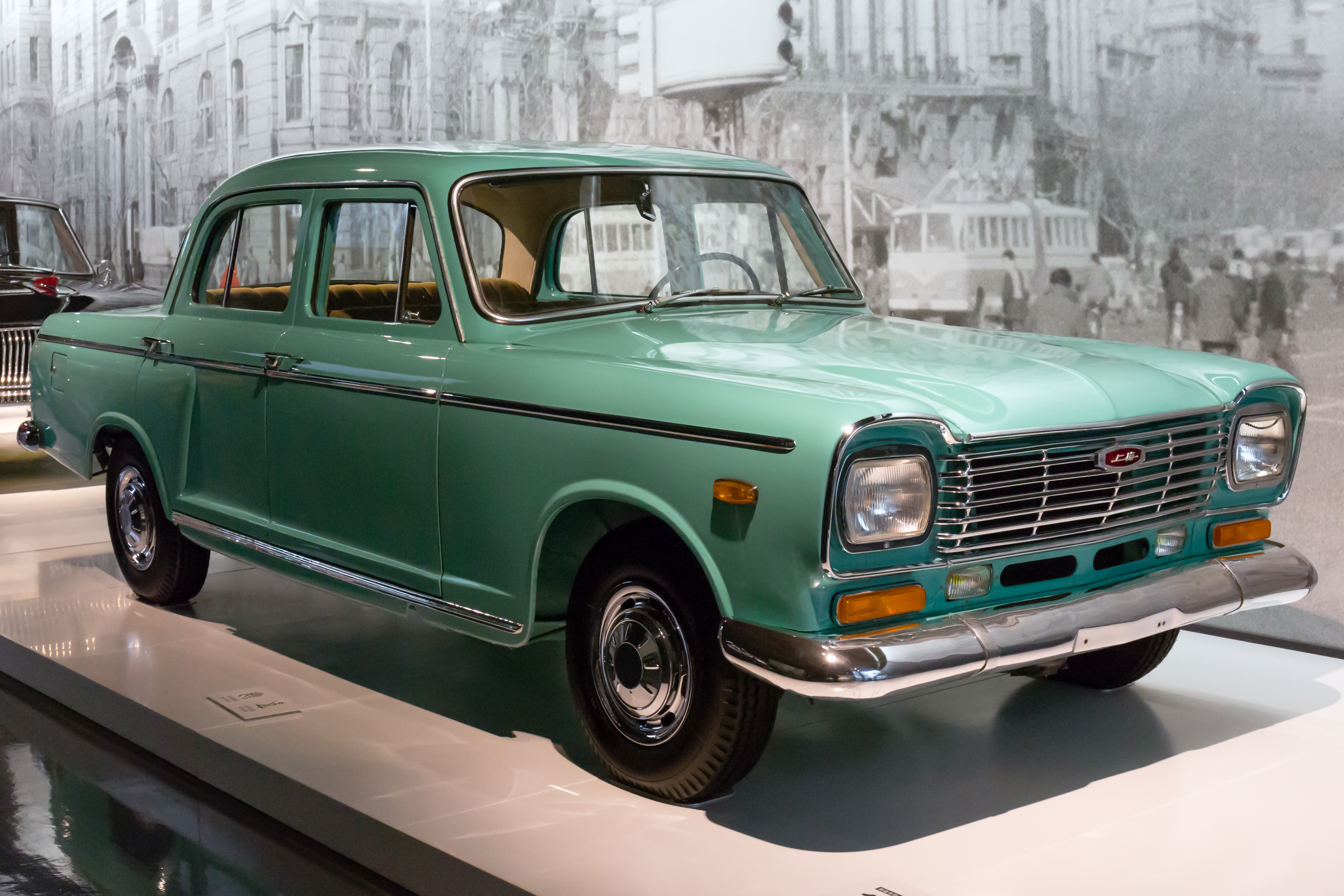
1974 Shanghai SH760A

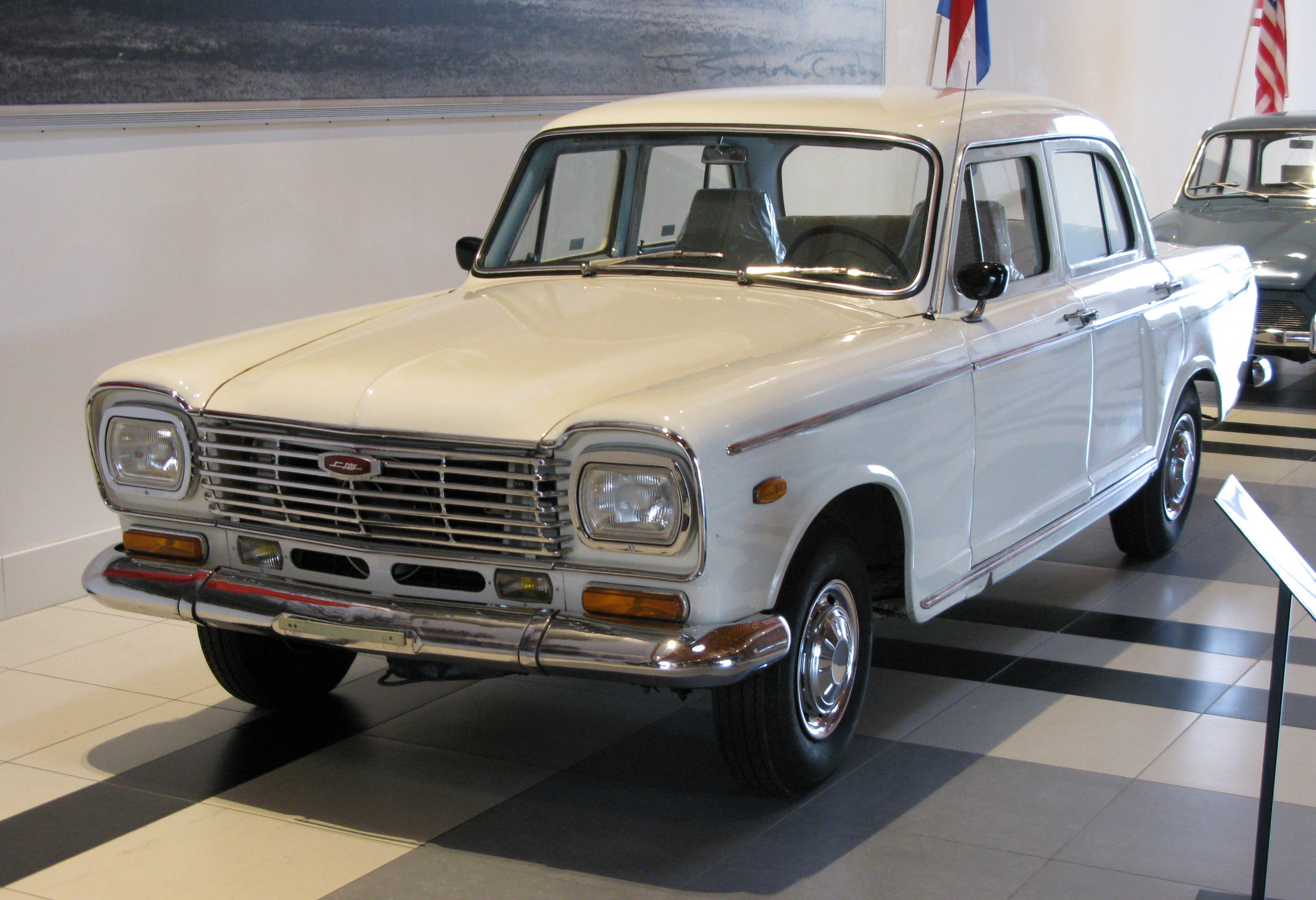
1986 Shanghai SH760

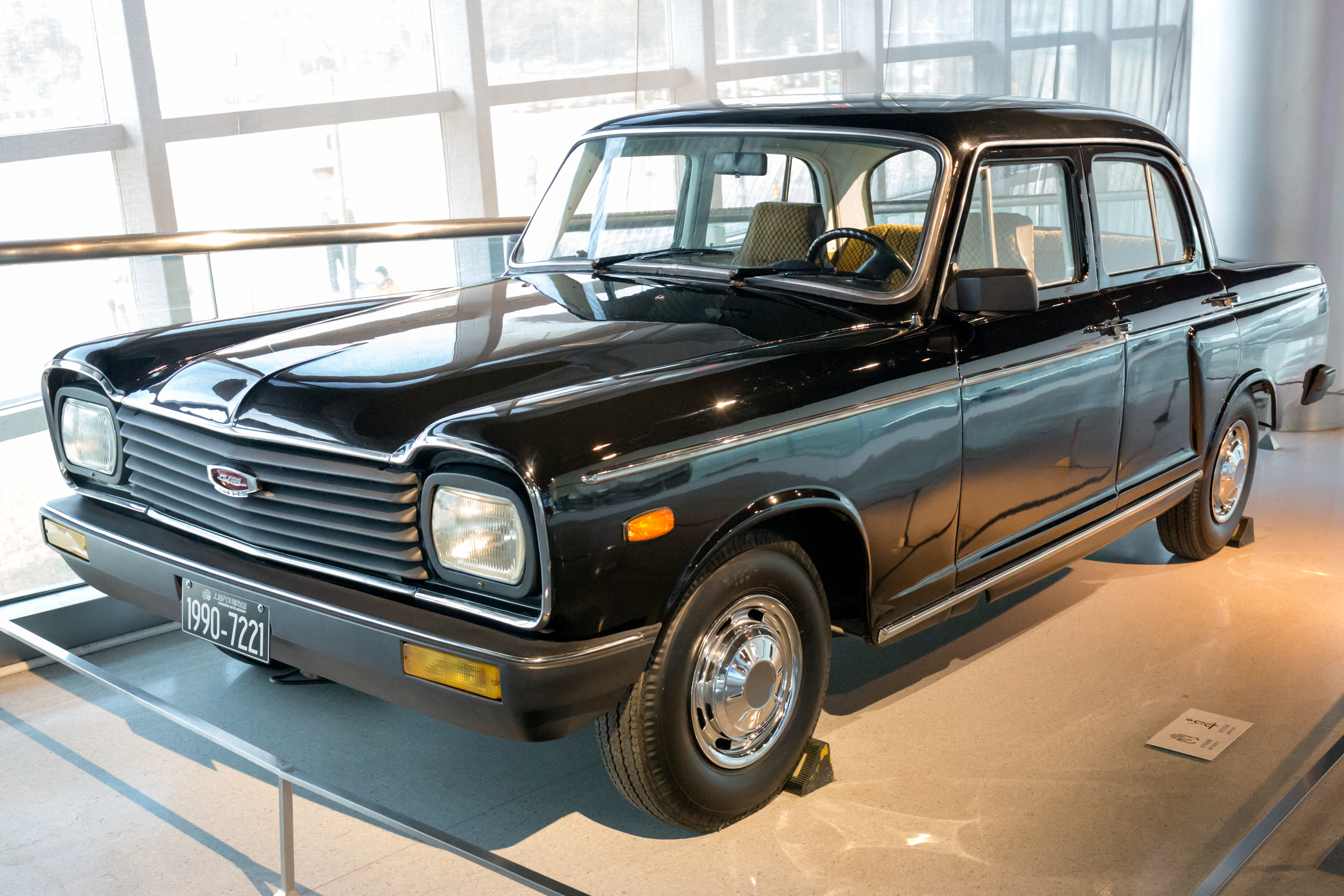
1990 Shanghai SH7221

=== Proposed replacements ===
A replacement for the SH760 was proposed as early as 1966 with the SH763, followed by the SH762 in 1967. Both models used the same engine as the SH760. In 1974, the SH771 was developed as another possible replacement for the SH760.

The SH771 was based on a 1972 Mercedes-Benz S-Class (W116) with different front and rear end styling, although the rear end resembled the W116.

Unlike the SH760, the SH771 used the 5.6 liter V8 from the Hongqi CA770 luxury car. Never produced, only 30 SH771s were built, and were used for testing until 1978. Beijing did not approve of full-scale production for the SH771.

A third potential SH760 replacement, the SH761, was developed in the 1980s as a convertible parade car.
