= Y Volveré =

Studio album by Los Ángeles Negros
- Released: 1970
- Genres: Pop rock, psychedelic rock, rhythm & blues
- Label: Parnaso

Y Volveré (translated, "And I will return") is an album by the Chilean rock band, the Los Ángeles Negros. The album was released in 1970 on the Parnaso label. In a 2024 ranking of the 600 greatest Latin American albums, Y Volveré was ranked No. 45.

The title track from the album became an international hit. It has been called "one of the greatest and most emotional anthems in all of Latin America."

== Track listing ==
Side A

1. Y Volvere (A. Barriere)
2. Por Siempre (L. Alarcon)
3. Mejor Es Morir, Morir (arranged by Nano Concha, written by O. Geldres)
4. Y Buen Viaje (S. Scott)
5. De Otro Brazo (C. Alegria, J. C. Gil)
6. Murio La Flor (De la Fuente, N. Concha)

Side B

1. Como Quisiera Decirte (O. Salinas)
2. Mi Niña (arranged by Nano Concha, written by S. Scott)
3. Ay Amor (L. Barragan, O. Caceres)
4. El Rey Y Yo (O. Geldres)
5. Yo Se Que Estas (O. Salinas)
6. Tanto Adios (O. Salinas)

== Sales ==
Region	Certification	Certified units/sales
Mexico	—	750,000
Venezuela	—	72,000

== See also ==
- 1970s in Latin music
