= Berliner (format) =

Newspaper format

Comparison of some newspaper sizes with metric paper sizes. Approximate nominal dimensions are in millimetres.

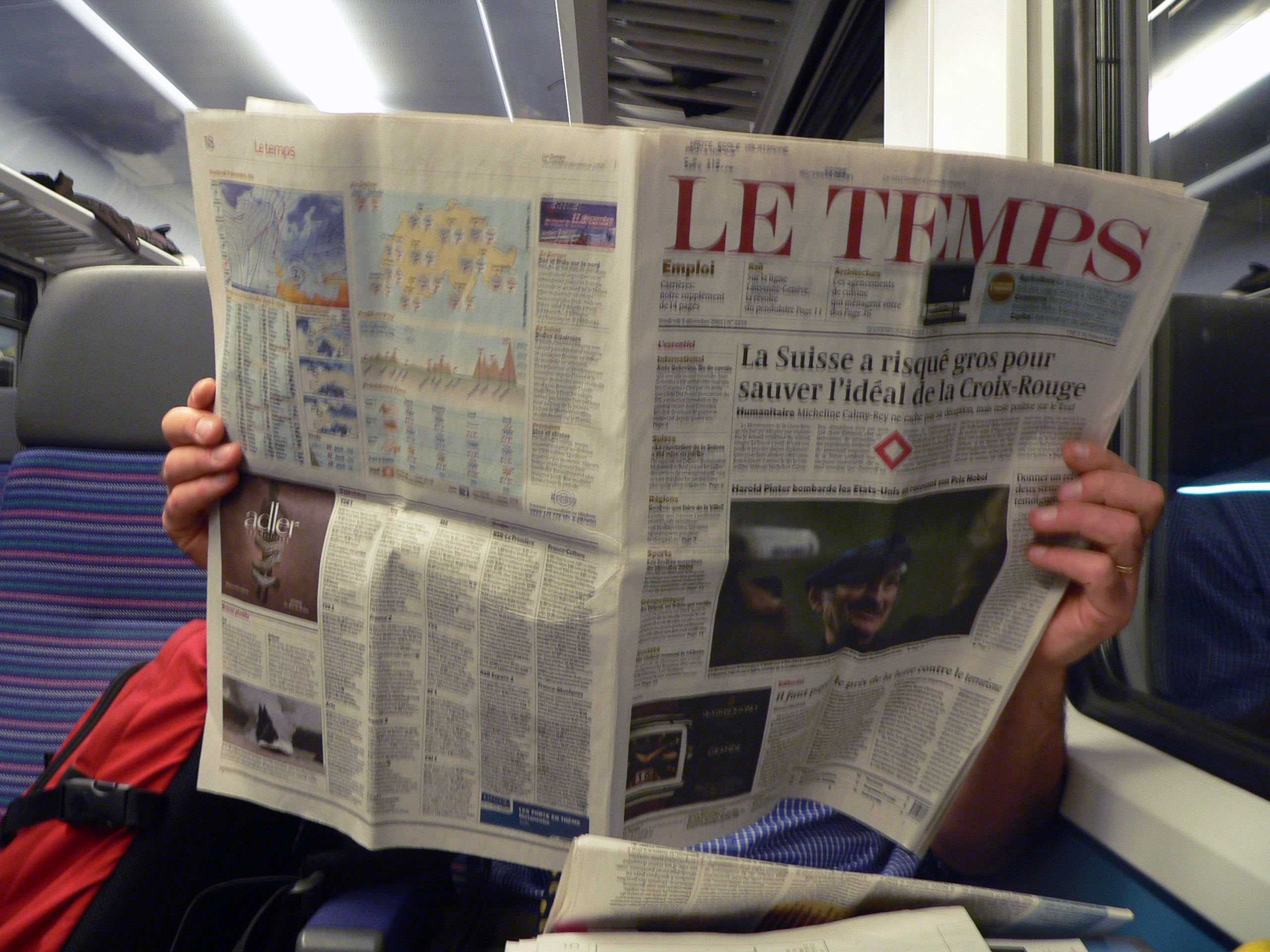
The Swiss French-language newspaper Le Temps has the Berliner format.

Berliner is a newspaper format with pages normally measuring about 315 by 470 millimetres (12.4 in × 18.5 in). The Berliner format, or "midi", is slightly taller and marginally wider than the tabloid/compact format, and is both narrower and shorter than the broadsheet format.

== Origin ==
The Berliner format is an innovation in press and an alternative to the broadsheet format. The name refers to the city of Berlin, and was originally contrasted with "North German" and "French" sizes in the early 20th century.

== European newspapers ==
The Berliner format is used by many European newspapers, including dailies such as Le Monde and Le Figaro in France, Le Temps in Switzerland, La Repubblica and La Stampa in Italy, El País and El Mundo in Spain, De Morgen, Le Soir and Het Laatste Nieuws in Belgium, Oslobođenje in Bosnia, Mladá fronta Dnes and Lidové noviny in the Czech Republic, and others such as Expresso in Portugal and Jurnalul Național or Evenimentul Zilei in Romania. The French business newspaper Les Échos changed to this format in September 2003, and the largest daily papers in Croatia (Večernji list), Serbia (Politika) and Montenegro (Vijesti), are also in this format. A recent European newspaper to join this trend is Het Financieele Dagblad, the daily Dutch newspaper that is focused on business and financial matters on 26 March 2013. Student publication The University Observer became Ireland's first Berliner-sized paper in September 2009. In the UK, The Guardian and The Observer changed from broadsheet to Berliner in 2005 but changed again to tabloid in 2017 for cost-saving reasons. The Independent in London considered adopting this format, but could not afford to buy new presses; it moved directly from broadsheet to tabloid size. As of 2022, no UK national newspaper uses Berliner.

Although the daily Berliner Zeitung is occasionally called simply Berliner, it is not printed in Berliner format. In fact, only two German national dailies use Berliner format: Die Tageszeitung (generally known as the "taz"); and the Junge Welt, which in 2004 abandoned the unique slightly-larger-than-A4 size that had distinguished it since the early 1990s. The majority of the national quality dailies use the larger broadsheet format known as "nordisch", measuring 570 mm × 400 mm (22.44 in × 15.75 in).

== United States newspapers ==
The daily Journal & Courier in Lafayette, Indiana, was the first newspaper in North America to be produced in this format, making its debut on 31 July 2006. The Bucks County Herald in Lahaska, Pennsylvania, followed in 2009, and The Chronicle in Laurel, Mississippi, in April 2012, commencing publication at that time. Major papers, such as the Chicago Tribune and The Cincinnati Enquirer, have tested the format.

Since then, a number of broadsheet newspapers throughout the United States have adopted a page format similar to Berliner, though some may use a taller page. In some instances, only the width has changed from the typical broadsheet page, and the height has remained the same or close to it. For example, The New York Times used a 22-inch (559 mm) tall by 13.5-inch (343 mm) wide page, but in 2007 downsized to 22 by 12 in (559 by 305 mm). It still refers to itself as a broadsheet, even though its size is closer to Berliner.

== Asian newspapers ==
The Indian business daily Mint, a collaboration with the Indian media house Hindustan Times Media Limited (HTML) and The Wall Street Journal, was among the first newspapers to use the Berliner format, starting from 1 February 2007. In Nepal, the Nepali Times became the first and the only newspaper using this format. In Pakistan, the English daily Pakistan Today is published in the Berliner format. The Israeli newspaper Haaretz has been published in this format since 18 February 2007.

Though very rarely used in Metro Manila, the Berliner is the most popular format in the Philippines. In the Ilocandia, some of the well-known names are the Zigzag Weekly, the Northern Dispatch—commonly called as Nordis—and the Northern Philippine Times. In the Visayas, the Panay News (Visayas' most widely circulated newspaper) also uses this format. Though not published for commercial purposes, the official publication of Caritas Manila uses a slightly narrower Berliner format.

In March 2009, South Korea's JoongAng Ilbo adopted the Berliner format, becoming the first Korean newspaper to do so. Also in the same month, Turkey's Gazete Habertürk and Zaman adopted a variation of this format as 350 by 500 mm (13.78 by 19.69 in) and become two of the first Turkish newspaper to do so. The format is called Ciner format in Turkey because it is unique. On 1 June 2012, the UAE's leading English language newspaper, Gulf News, adopted the Berliner format, the first ever in the Arab Middle East.

== South American newspapers ==
Some South American papers have dubbed the "compact" size as "Berliner". The former (also called "tall tab") size is closer to tabloid, being marginally taller. The Buenos Aires Herald, a daily Argentine newspaper founded in 1876, uses the Berliner format, which is also used by La Nueva, a newspaper of the Buenos Aires province. Córdoba newspaper La Voz switched to Berliner from broadsheet in 2016. The Bolivian Los Tiempos newspaper from Cochabamba releases its editions in Berliner with full color in all pages starting October 2017. Previously, the newspaper was published in broadsheet. Brazil's Jornal do Brasil, a daily Brazilian newspaper founded in 1891, was published in Berliner from 16 April 2006 until 31 August 2010, when the newspaper ceased to publish its physical issue and transferred all activities to the internet. Initially, only the newsstand edition was in that format, but its success made the format switch extend later to the subscriber's edition, which until then had remained in broadsheet format. In 2008, Salvador-based Correio* (formerly Correio da Bahia) switched to Berliner, also from broadsheet. After being sold by Organizações Globo (currently Grupo Globo) to J. Hawilla's Grupo Traffic, another Brazilian newspaper, Diário de S. Paulo, which was a broadsheet, switched to Berliner, bringing it in line with its sister publications under Rede Bom Dia (the company, including Diário de S. Paulo, is currently owned by Cereja Digital). In 2003, Chilean national newspaper La Tercera switched from tabloid to Berliner. Local papers around Chile have also adopted the format, most notably El Mercurio de Valparaíso, the longest-running newspaper in Spanish language. As of 17 November 2017, the format expanded to Chilean La Cuarta, which previously published in tabloid, like La Tercera. The Peruvian El Comercio, the nation's most important newspaper, switched its weekday editions to Berliner in 2016. The weekend editions are still produced in broadsheet. Brazilian newspaper O Estado de São Paulo switched its physical edition to Berliner format as of 17 October 2021.

== African newspapers ==
In February 2010, Mauritius's century-old Le Mauricien adopted the Berliner format with full-colour content, thus becoming the first evening national paper in the country to adopt this format.

== See also ==
- List of newspapers
- Paper size
