= Mercedes-Benz W180 =

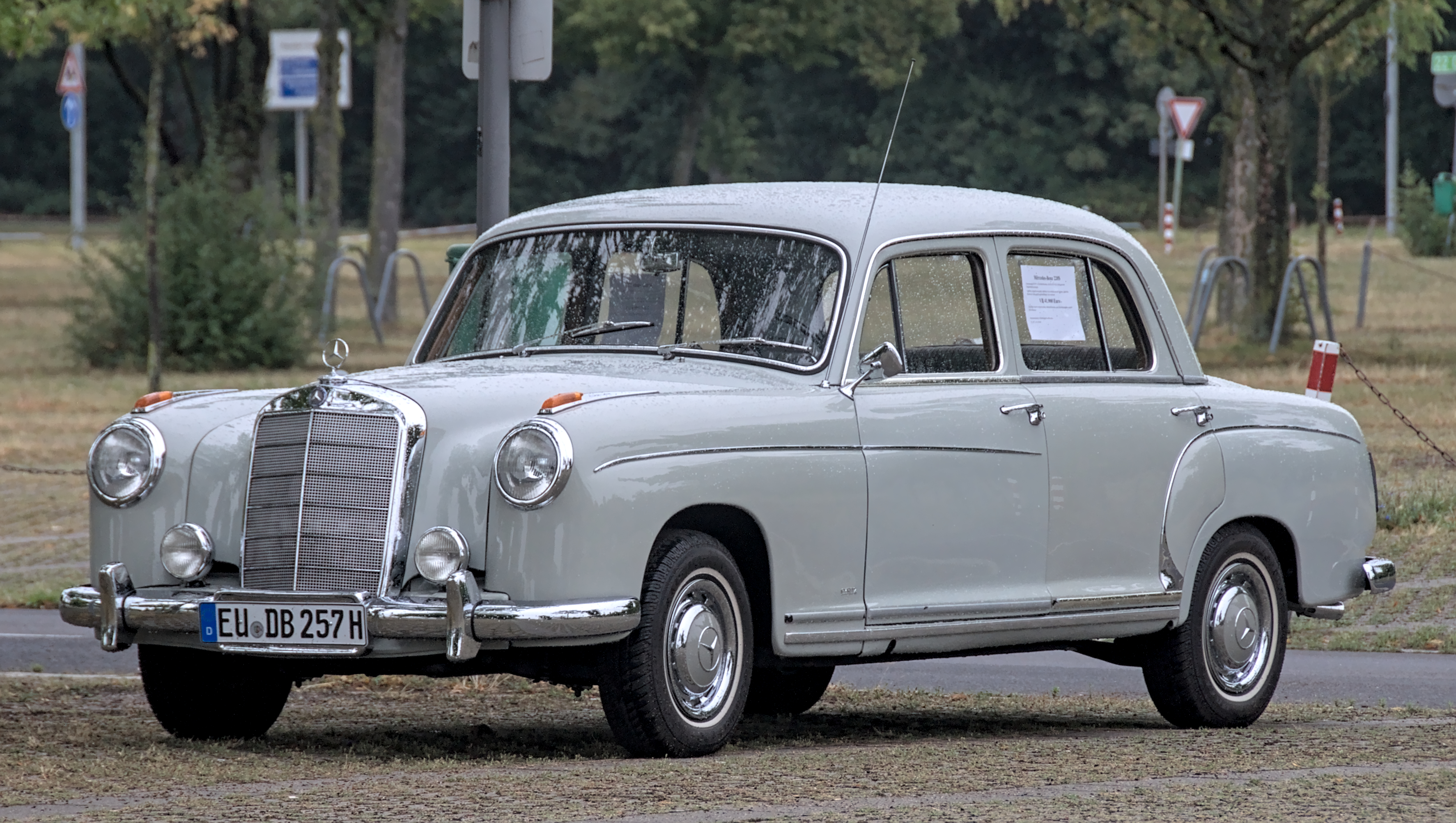
- W180 220 S sedan

Overview
- Manufacturer: Mercedes-Benz
- Production: March 1954 – October 1959; 84,645 built 220 a: 25,937; 220 S Saloon: 55,279; 220 S Cabriolet/Coupé: 3,429
- Assembly: West Germany: Stuttgart; Australia: Port Melbourne (AMI)

Body and chassis
- Class: luxury car
- Body style: 4-door saloon 2-door coupé 2-door convertible
- Related: Mercedes-Benz W120/W121 Shanghai SH760 — 180 & 190; Mercedes-Benz W105 — 219; Mercedes-Benz W128 — 220SE

Powertrain
- Engine: 2.2L M180 I6 (220 a); 2.2L M180.924 I6 (220 S)
- Transmission: 4-speed manual 4-speed Hydrak automatic

Dimensions
- Wheelbase: 2,820 mm (111.0 in) — saloon 2,700 mm (106.3 in) — coupé and cabriolet

Chronology
- Predecessor: Mercedes-Benz W187
- Successor: Mercedes-Benz W111

See Mercedes-Benz S-Class for a complete overview of all S-Class models.

The Mercedes-Benz W180 is a line of full-sized luxury cars produced by Mercedes-Benz between 1954 and 1959, which included an inline 6-cylinder saloon, coupé, and convertible. The four-door 220 a sedan was produced from 1954 to early-1956. It was succeeded by a slightly modified, more powerful 220 S in early 1956. A two-door cabriolet and coupe joined the line in mid-1956; all three models were produced through the end of the W180 run.

A fuel-injected version of the 220S was introduced in October 1958 as the W128, produced also in four-door sedan and two-door coupe and cabriolet through November 1960.

The W180 series was one in a range of Mercedes-Benz models to informally receive the "Ponton" nickname, derived from its unibody-type, pontoon-shaped exterior styling, which carried through into the subsequent W128 line.

== 220 a ==
The W180 was introduced in March 1954 as a larger, more luxurious, and up-scale version of the four-cylinder W120 model 180. The chassis' wheelbase had been stretched by 170 mm (6.7 in), with 100 mm (3.9 in) applied to accommodating the W180's longer straight-six M180 engine, and 70 mm (2.8 in) added to the passenger cabin to increase rear-seat legroom. From the side, W180 cars can readily be distinguished from W120s by the extra "quarter light" windows of their rear doors.

The single carburetor engine was carried over from the W187 model 220; and delivered 85 PS (63 kW; 84 hp). Production of the 220 a ended in April 1956, with 25,937 units produced.

== 220 S ==
The 220 a was succeeded in March 1956 by the slightly modified, more powerful 220 S, fitted with an upgraded version of the 2.2 L inline-six, initially producing (100 PS (74 kW; 99 hp); later it was given a second carburetor, raising output to 106 PS (78 kW; 105 hp)).

External changes were minimal, with the 220 S receiving a one-piece front bumper, down from a three piece, and a pair of solid chrome strips running under its doors in place of twin chrome and rubber ones. The most obvious difference was the addition of a fine, interrupted chrome accent strip running along the fenders and doors.

The 220 S retained the 4-speed column shift manual transmission, but offered an optional Hydrak automatic clutch, which used small microswitches on the gear selector to automatically disengage the clutch when changing gears.

Also introduced at the time of the 220 S was the W105 219, a more affordable 6-cylinder Mercedes-Benz combining the engine and long-hooded body of the 220 a from the A-pillar forward with the shorter body of the W120/W121 A-pillar back. This gave it a more cramped cabin than a 220, but the power and prestige of a basic inline six.

In July 1956, a two-door cabriolet was added to the W180 line-up, and in October 1956 a matching coupé. Some convertibles were finished with folding rear seats to accommodate additional luggage.

== Production numbers ==
Through October 1959, 55,279 220 S saloons and 3,429 convertibles and coupés were built.

== Gallery ==
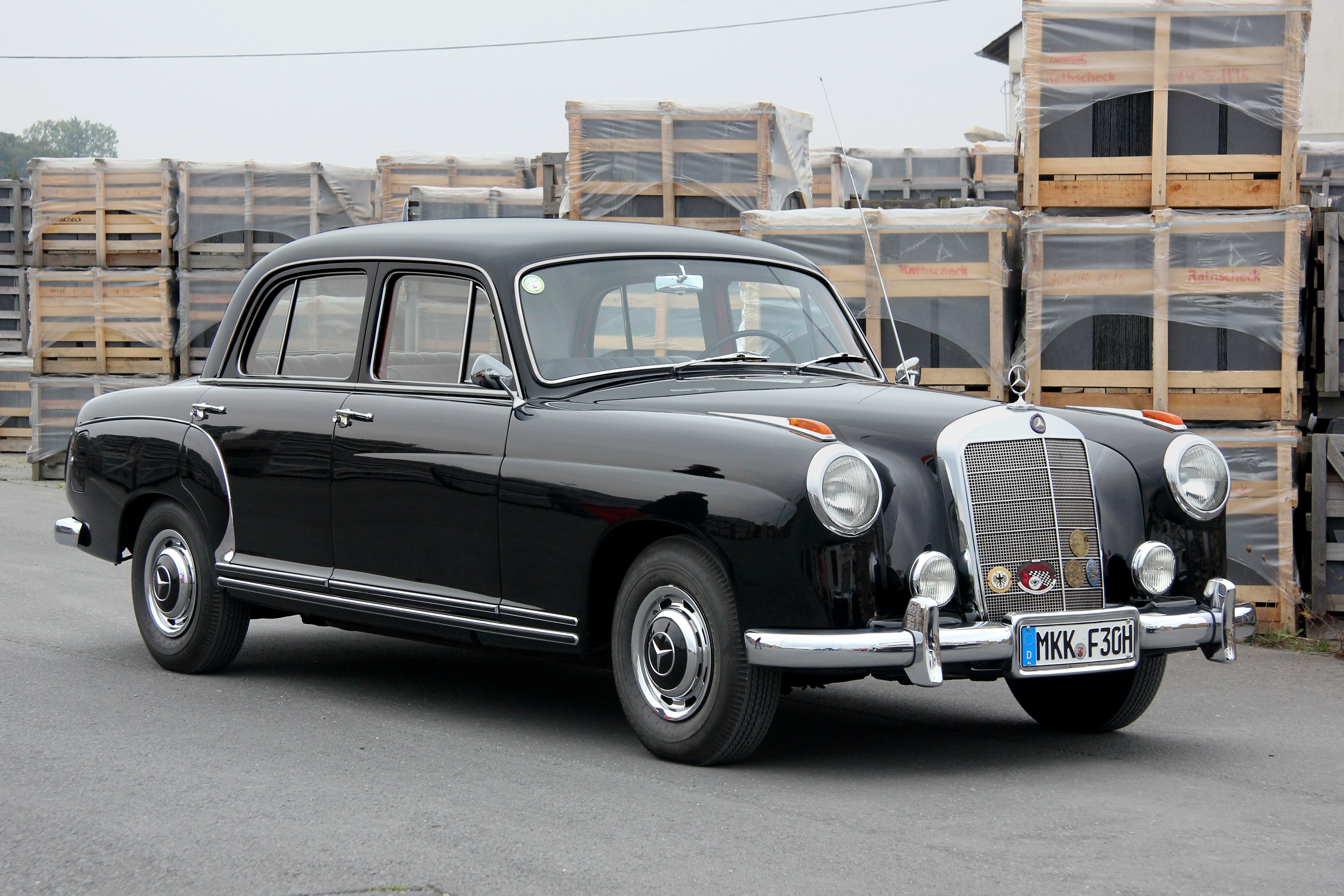
Mercedes-Benz 220 a saloon (W180)

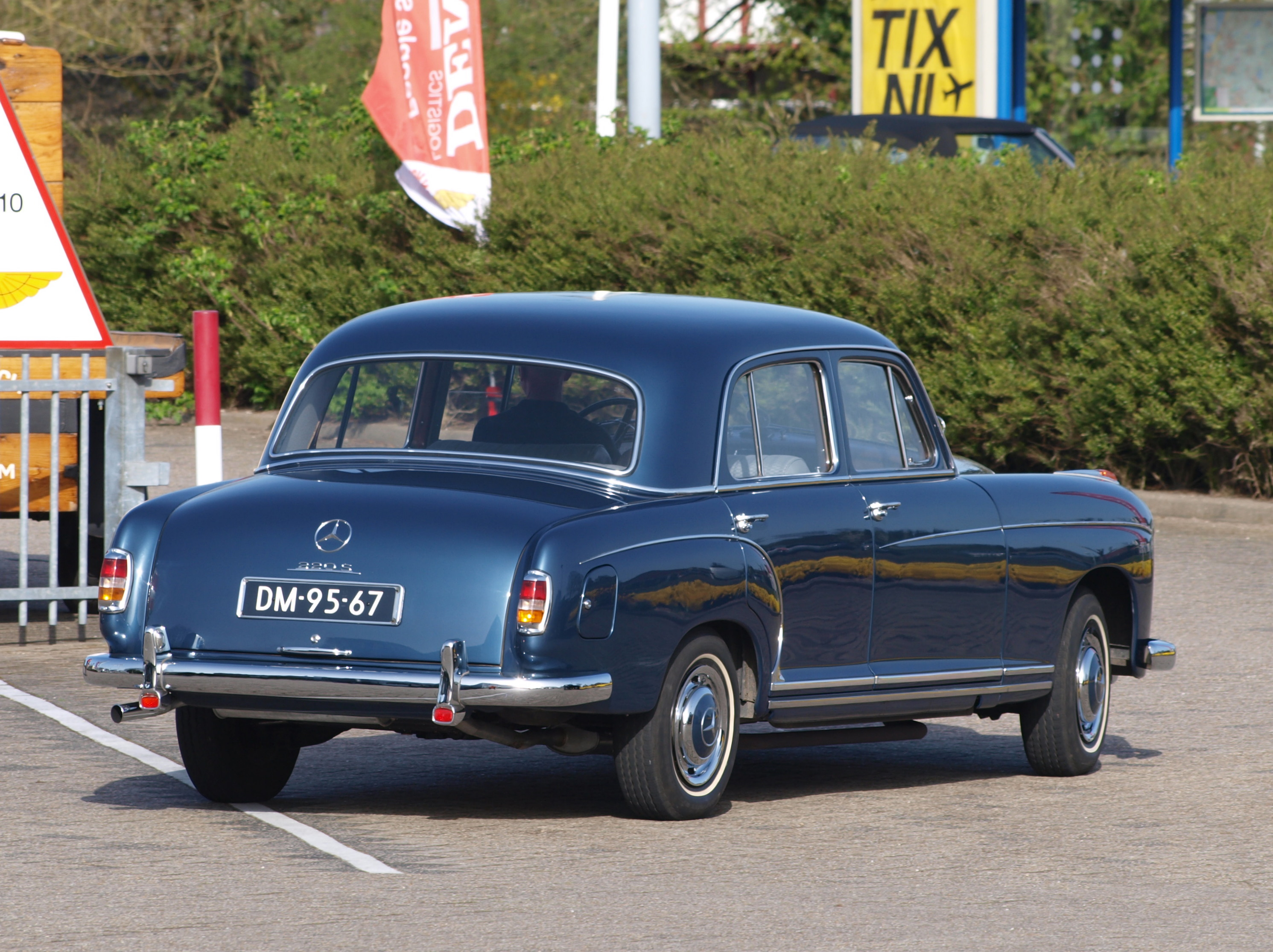
1959 Mercedes-Benz 220 S saloon (W180)

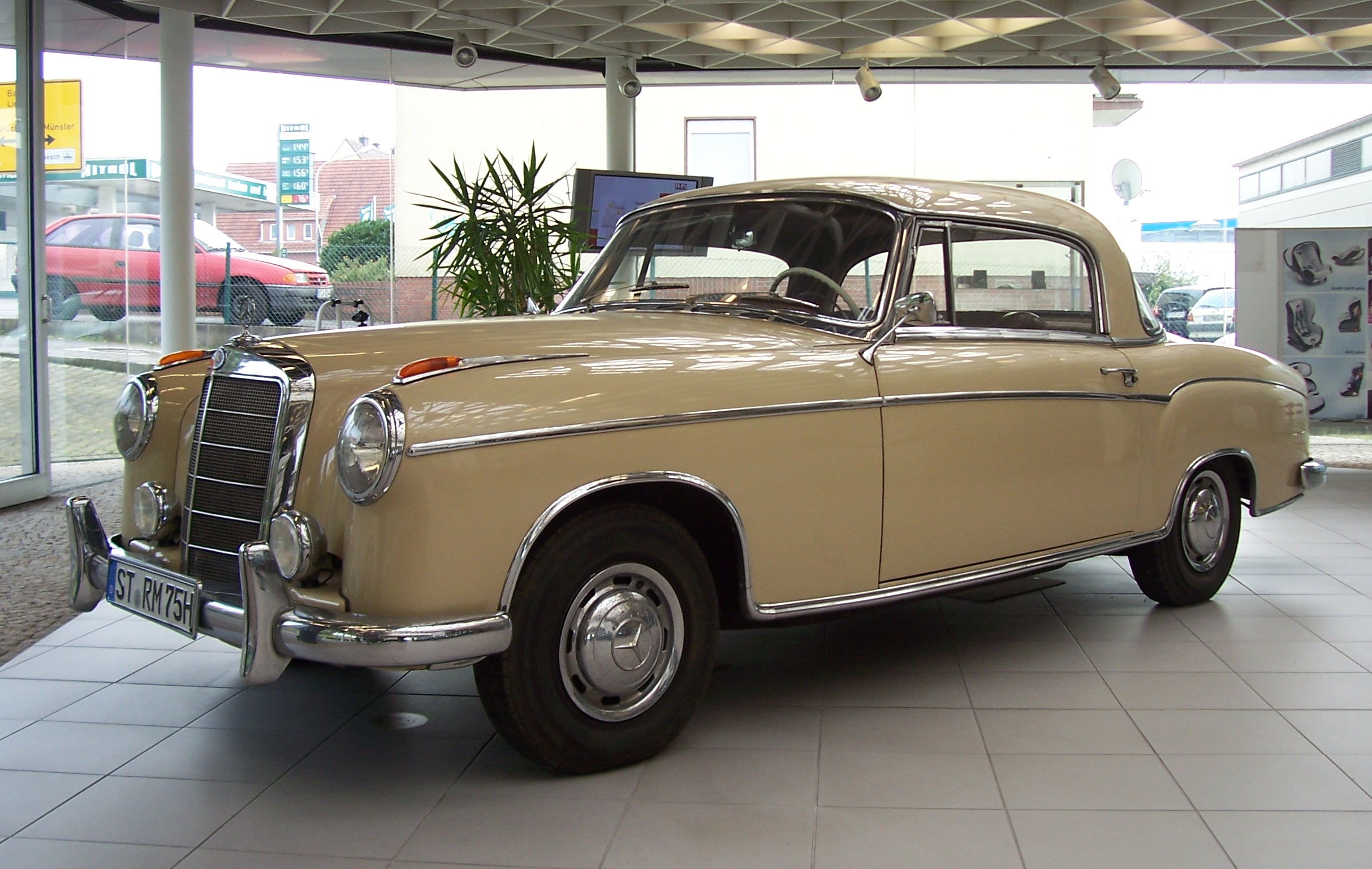
1957 Mercedes-Benz 220 S Coupe (W180)

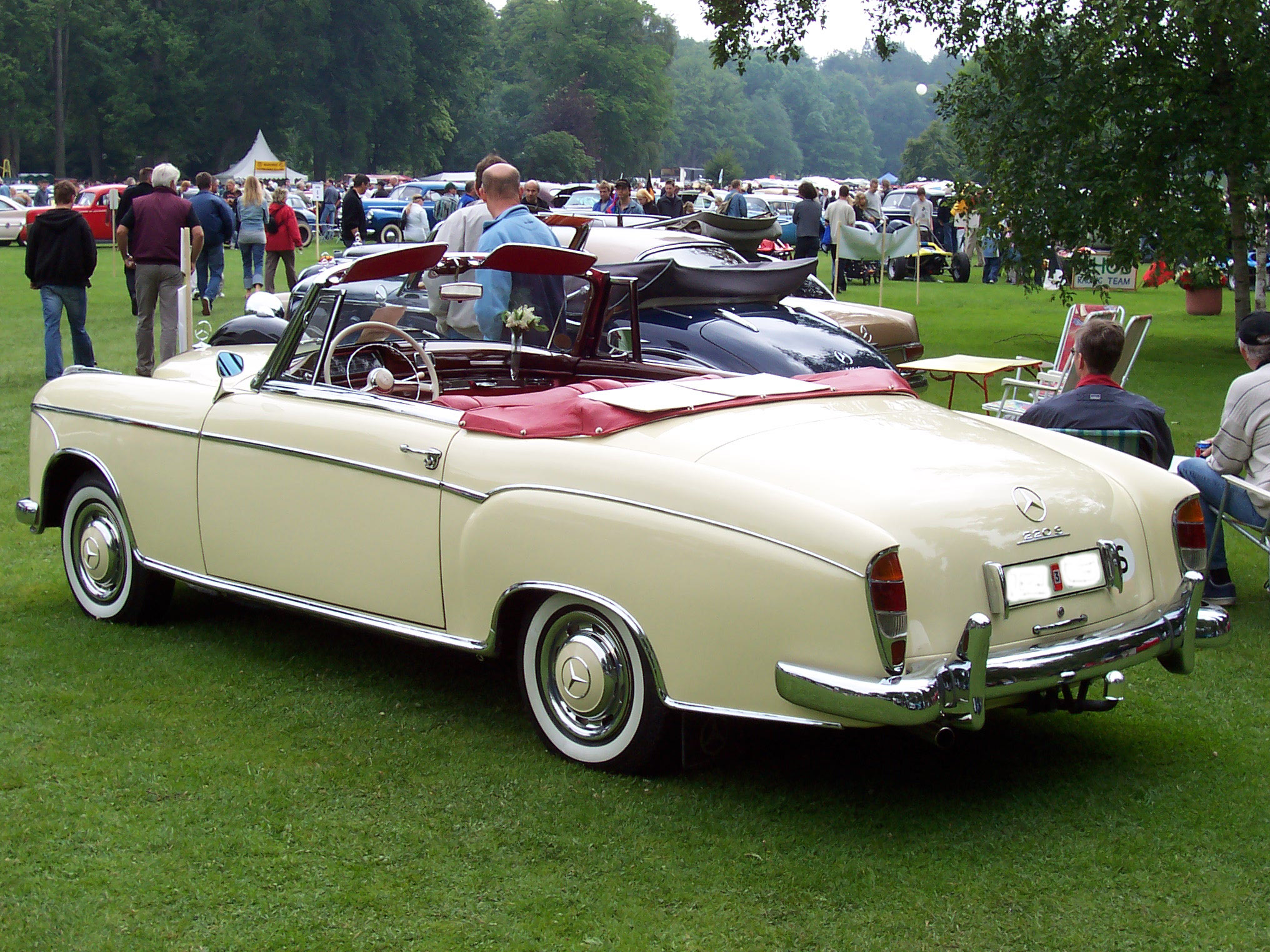
Mercedes-Benz 220 S Convertible (W180)

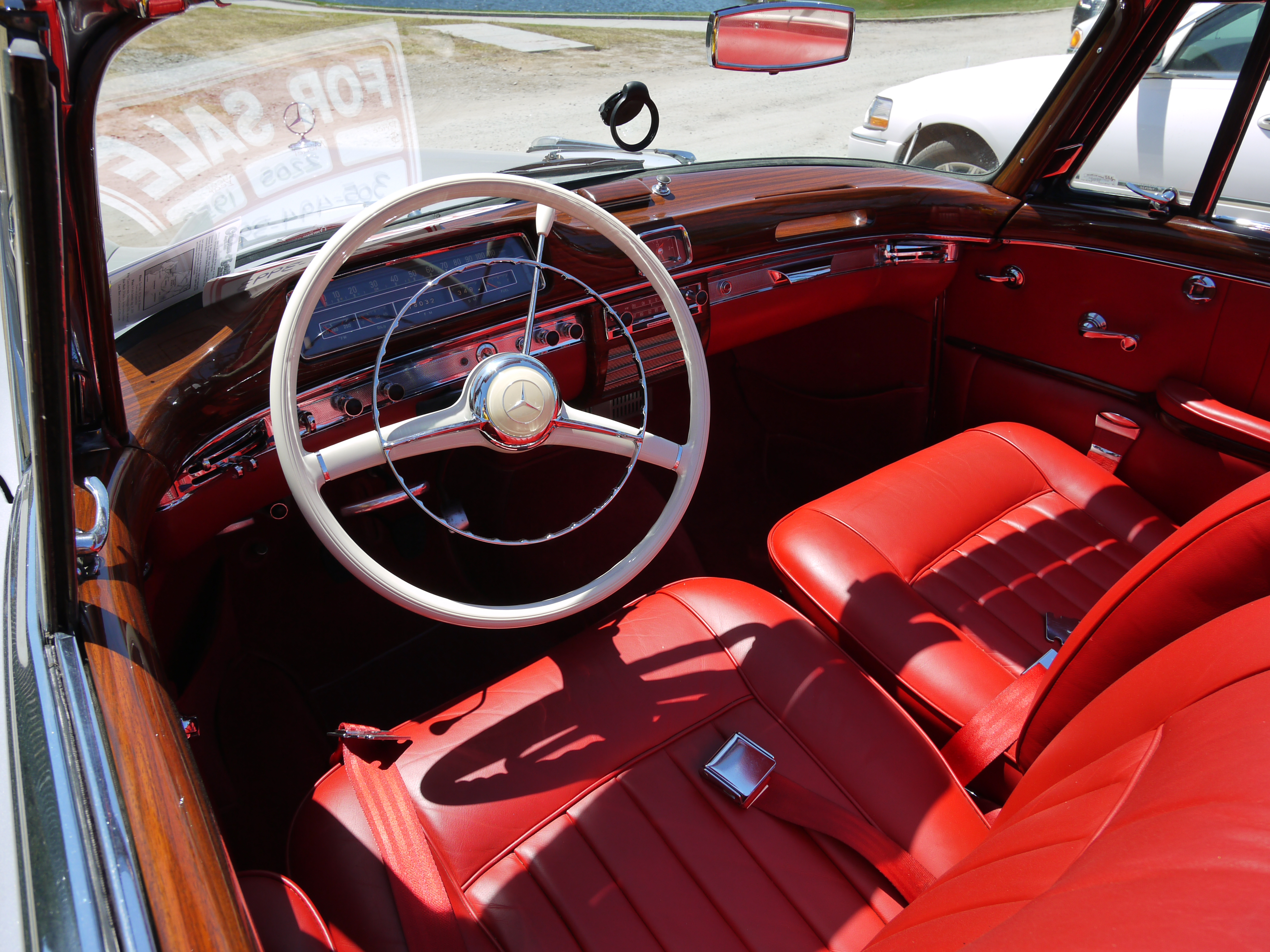
Mercedes-Benz 220 S Convertible interior (W180)

Technical data Mercedes-Benz W180 (Manufacturer's figures except where stated)
Mercedes-Benz	220 a (W180 I)	220 S (W180 II)	220 S Convertible/Coupé (W180 II)
Produced:	1954–1956	1956–1959	1956–1959
Engine:	6-cylinder-inline engine (four-stroke), front-mounted		
Bore x Stroke:	80 mm x 72.8 mm		
Displacement:	2195 cc		
Max. Power @ rpm:	85 PS (63 kW; 84 hp) @ 4800	100 PS (74 kW; 99 hp) @ 4800 from August 1957: 106 PS (78 kW; 105 hp) @ 5200	
Max. Torque @ rpm:	157 N⋅m (116 lb⋅ft) @ 2400	162 N⋅m (119 lb⋅ft) @ 3500 from August 1957: 171.5 N⋅m (126.5 lb⋅ft) @ 3500	
Compression Ratio:	7.6: 1	7.6: 1 from August 1957: 8.6: 1	
Fuel feed:	Single 2-bbl Solex 32 PAJTA	Dual 2-bbl Solex 32 PAJTA	
Fuel tank capacity:	64 L (16.9 US gal; 14.1 imp gal)		
Valvetrain:	SOHC, duplex chain		
Cooling:	Water		
Gearbox:	4-speed manual w/ column shifter rear wheel drive, standard axle ratio 4.11:1 (later 4.10:1)		
Electrical system:	12 volt		
Front suspension:	Double wishbones, coil springs, stabilising bar		
Rear suspension::	Swing axle, radius arms, coil springs		
Brakes:	Drum brakes (Ø 230 mm), power assisted		
Steering:	Recirculating-ball steering		
Body structure:	Sheet steel, monocoque (unibody) construction		
Dry weight:	1,300 kg (2,900 lb)	1,350 kg (2,980 lb)	Convertible A/C: 1,450 kg (3,200 lb); Coupé: 1,410 kg (3,110 lb)
Loaded weight:	1,730 kg (3,810 lb)	1,790 kg (3,950 lb)	1,815 kg (4,001 lb)
Track front/ rear:	1,430 mm (56 in) / 1,470 mm (58 in)		
Wheelbase:	2,820 mm (111 in)		2,700 mm (110 in)
Length:	4,715 mm (185.6 in)	4,750 mm (187 in)	4,760 mm (187 in)
Width:	1,740 mm (69 in)	1,740 mm (69 in)	1,765 mm (69.5 in)
Height:	1,560 mm (61 in)	1,560 mm (61 in)	1,530 mm (60 in)
Tyre/Tire sizes:	6.70 x 13		
Top speed:	150 km/h (93 mph)	160 km/h (99 mph)	160 km/h (99 mph)
Fuel Consumption (estimate):	13.5 L/100 km (20.9 mpg_{‑imp}; 17.4 mpg_{‑US})	13.5 L/100 km (20.9 mpg_{‑imp}; 17.4 mpg_{‑US})	13.5 L/100 km (20.9 mpg_{‑imp}; 17.4 mpg_{‑US})
Price Germany; USA:	DM 12,500 $4,175	DM 12,500 $4,494	DM 21,500 $7,138
