= 220 (album) =

1996 instrumental album by Phil Keaggy

Studio album by Phil Keaggy
- Released: September 3, 1996
- Studio: Javelina Studios, Kegworth Studio and OmniSound Studios (Nashville, Tennessee); Gambit Studio (Gallatin, Tennessee)
- Genre: Rock; Blues
- Length: 48:29
- Label: Sparrow
- Producer: Bill Deaton

Phil Keaggy chronology
| Acoustic Sketches (1996) | 220 (1996) | On the Fly (1997) |

Professional ratings
Review scores
| Source | Rating |
|---|---|
| AllMusic | 2.5/5 stars |

220 is an instrumental album by guitarist Phil Keaggy, released in 1996. In contrast to Acoustic Sketches, songs are performed using electric guitar. The album reached No. 21 on the Top Contemporary Christian chart.

== Track listing ==
All songs written by Phil Keaggy.

1. "Animal" - 4:49
2. "Arrow" - 6:02
3. "Montana" - 4:44
4. "Tennessee Morning" - 3:55
5. "Great Escape" - 7:12
6. "Stomp" - 4:40
7. "Highland" - 5:52
8. "Beyond This Day" - 4:22
9. "Ian's Groove" - 3:35
10. "Watt Ever (220 Jam)" - 3:18

== Personnel ==
- Phil Keaggy – guitars, bass (3, 8, 9), drums (3), tambourine (3), synthesizers (8)
- Phil Madeira – Hammond B3 organ (1, 9), slide guitar (9)
- Patrick Leonard – clavinet (1, 6), keyboards (2, 4), acoustic piano (4, 5, 7), Hammond B3 organ (5, 6), synthesizers (6, 7)
- Spencer Campbell – bass (1, 2, 4-7, 10)
- Lynn Williams – drums (1, 2, 4-8, 10), cymbals (9)
- Ian Keaggy – drums (9)
- Eric Darken – percussion (3, 4, 6-8)
- Blair Masters – drum loop programming (5)
- Chris Carmichael – fiddle (7)
- Hunter Lee – Scottish war pipes (7), tin whistle (7)
- Pat Bergeson – harmonica (9)

=== Production ===
- John Mays – executive producer
- Bill Deaton – producer, recording, mixing
- Russ Long – Irish crowd recording (9)
- Phil Keaggy – additional recording
- Patrick Kelly – recording assistant
- Amanda Sears – recording assistant
- Aaron Swihart – recording assistant
- Tom King – recording assistant (10)
- Darren Smith – mix assistant
- Carry Summers – mix assistant
- Doug Sax – mastering at The Mastering Lab (Hollywood, California)
- Charles Garrett – guitar technician
- Karen Philpott – creative director
- Bruce Ellefson – design
- Rich Borge – cover illustration
- Ron Keith – photography
- Jamie Kearney – stylist
- Lori Turk – hair, make-up
- Proper Management – management
