= Mercedes-Benz 220 =

Mercedes-Benz has sold a number of automobiles with the "220" model name:

- 1951–1955 W187
  - 1951–1955 220
- 1954–1959 W180
  - 1954–1956 220a
  - 1956–1959 220S
- 1958–1960 W128
  - 1958–1960 220SE
- 1959–1965 W111
  - 1959–1965 220b
  - 1959–1965 220Sb
  - 1959–1965 220SEb
- 1968–1973 W115
  - 1968–1973 220
  - 1968–1973 220D
- 1994–1997 W202
  - 1994–1997 C220
