= NGC 220 =

Open cluster in the constellation Tucana

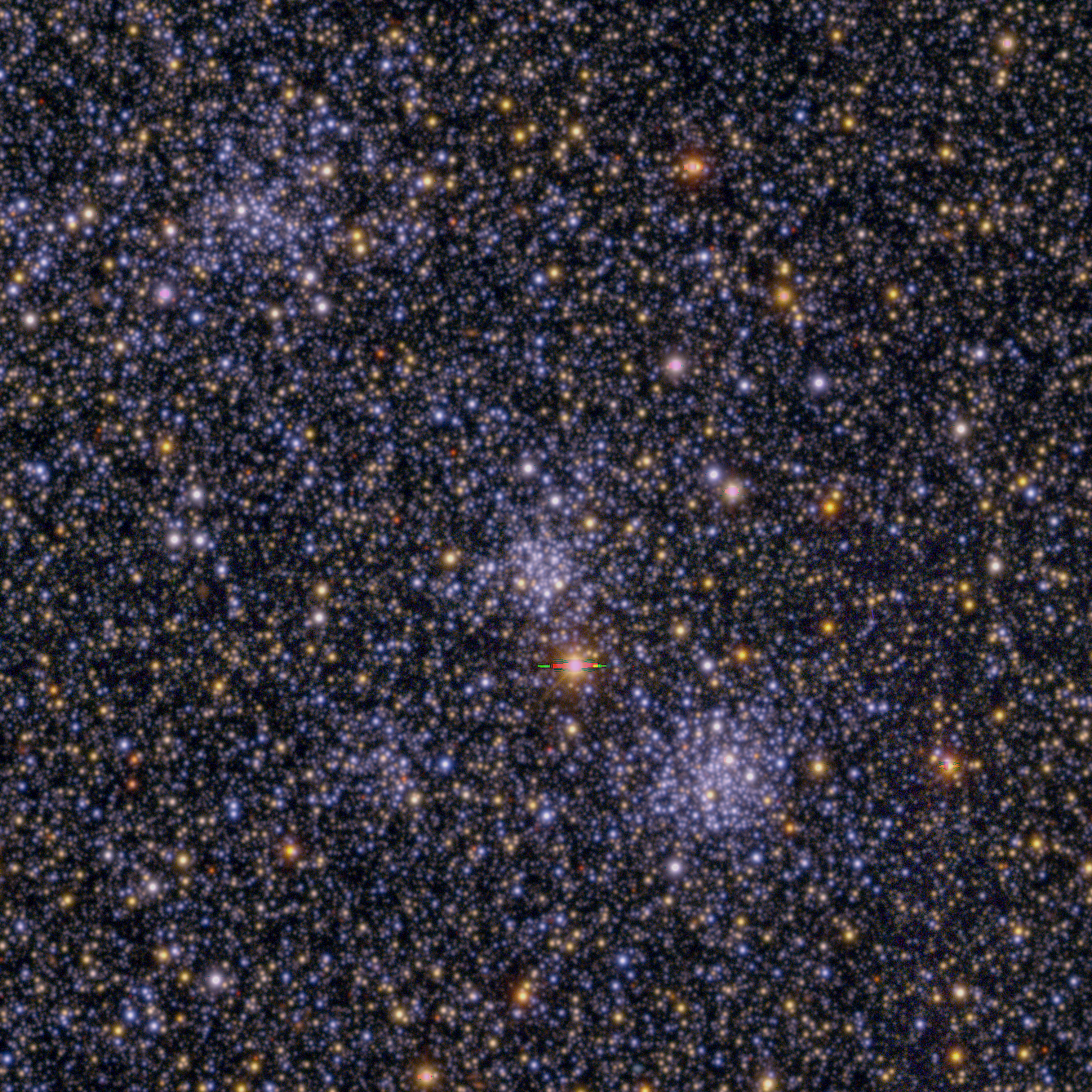
- NGC 220 (lower right), NGC 222 (middle) and NGC 231 (upper left) with DECam

Observation data (J2000 epoch)
- Right ascension: 00^{h} 40^{m} 29.9^{s}
- Declination: −73° 24′ 14″
- Distance: 210000 ly
- Apparent magnitude (V): 14.39
- Apparent dimensions (V): 1.20′ × 1.20′

Physical characteristics
- Mass: 7.9×10^{3} M_{☉}
- Estimated age: 120 Myr
- Other designations: ESO 029-SC 003.

Associations
- Constellation: Tucana

NGC 220 is an open cluster located approximately 210,000 light-years from the Sun in the Small Magellanic Cloud. It is located in the constellation Tucana. It was discovered on August 12, 1834 by John Herschel.

== See also ==
- open cluster
- List of NGC objects (1–1000)
- Small Magellanic Cloud
