= La Cuarta =

Chilean newspaper

- Front page of La Cuarta's 10 September 2013 edition. Front page of La Cuarta's 10 September 2013 edition.
- Type: Daily newspaper
- Format: Berliner
- Owner: COPESA
- Editor: Diozel Pérez
- Founded: 1984
- Political alignment: Socialism, Christian Democracy
- Language: Spanish
- Headquarters: Santiago, Chile
- Website: Official website

La Cuarta (Spanish: The Fourth One) is a Chilean daily tabloid and part of the Copesa group. The newspaper is famous for its tone and plebeian style of headlining stories. The newspaper began publication on 13 November 1984. On 17 November 2017, the newspaper changed its logo and format, with the newspaper now published in Berliner, instead of tabloid.

One of its main features is a weekly insert of nude photographs.

== Characteristics ==
Logo of La Cuarta used from 2017 to 2021.

Logo of La Cuarta used from 2021 to 2025.

This tabloid is notable for being directed to an audience of middle and lower socioeconomic strata. It uses the Chilean Spanish non-formal register with a series of slang and informal expressions of Chile. It also addresses issues that are mostly of a sensationalist, mostly about sex, crime reports and on the national entertainment news, this last section is called La Cuarta Espectacular and differs from the rest of the day as to design.

The style of writing and presentation of content are closer to the red or yellow press Style The Sun (UK), The National Enquirer (US) and Bild-Zeitung (Germany). It also approximates the style of the late Clarin (1954-1973), but without the political emphasis contingent left-wing

La Cuarta is part of Periódicos Asociados Latinoamericanos (Latin American Newspaper Association), an organization of fourteen leading newspapers in South America.

== Sections and supplements ==
The journal has sections such as La Ventanita Sentimental (The little sentimental window), where readers ask for love advice, the nail on the head, an area of written complaints such as a telephone conversation, and Arroz con Leche (Rice Pudding), which are offered and request appointments and couples. Also there are two comics: Pepe Antártico (drawn by Percy Eaglehurst) and Palomita (drawn by Eduardo de la Barra).

The newspaper used to have two flagship daily supplements together, both related to sex: "Vida Afectiva y Sexual" (Sexual and affective life) and erotic poster called "La Bomba 4", with the final edition published on 2 June 2013 and 16 November 2017, respectively. In addition, there is another supplement called Topísima that addresses issues related to housewives.
