= Optima Signature =

Skyscraper in Chicago, Illinois

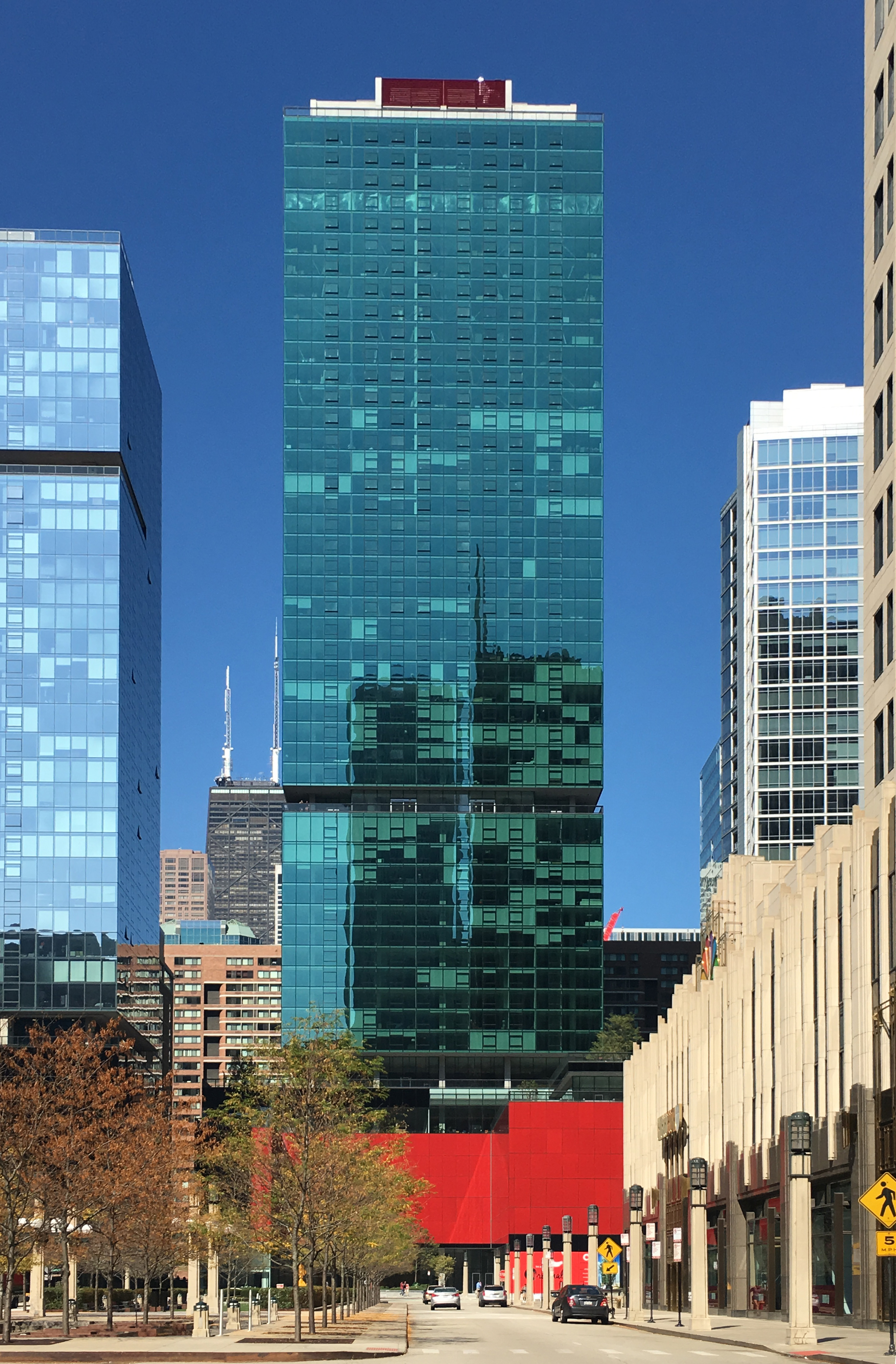
- Optima Signature in September 2017

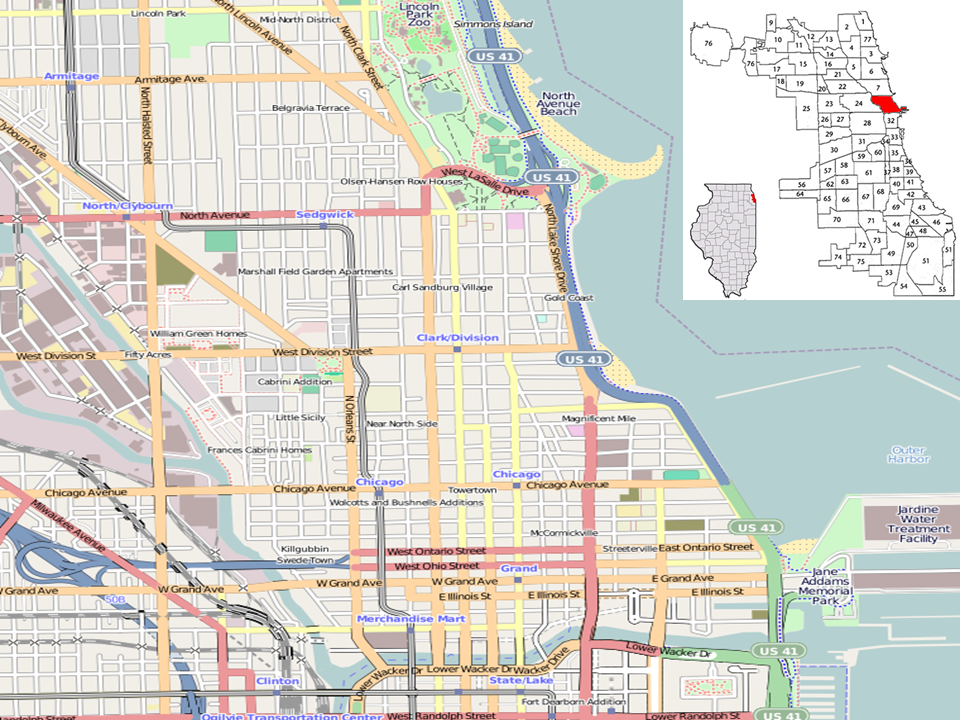
- Location within Near North Side, Chicago Optima Signature (Illinois) Optima Signature (the United States)
- Former names: Optima Chicago Center II

General information
- Status: Completed
- Type: Residences
- Location: Chicago, Illinois, 220 E. Illinois St.
- Coordinates: 41°53′29.5″N 87°37′18″W
- Construction started: 2014
- Completed: 2017

Height
- Height: 587 feet (179 m)

Technical details
- Floor count: 57

Other information
- Number of units: 490

Optima Signature (formerly Optima Chicago Center II) is a residential skyscraper in the Streeterville neighborhood of the Near North Side area in Chicago. The 57-story building is a joint venture between Optima Inc. and DeBartolo Development. It opened for occupancy in June 2017. The building has 490 units.

== History ==
Originally named Optima Chicago Center II and planned as a 55-story companion to the neighboring 42-story Optima Chicago Center that had been completed in 2013, the structure was initially planned to potentially be a hotel-apartment hybrid. By the time construction began in late 2014, the structure had a confirmed all-apartment 57-floor plan with 498 units.

Construction was halted for a few months due to the planning process before resuming with $225 million in construction loans from Bank of America, PNC Bank and Fifth Third Bank in mid-2015. These final plans completed in 2015 revised the 57 floor structure to the eventual 490 units.

== Description ==
The building is 57 stories high and includes 490 apartments, which are divided into two luxury classes. The Tower residences on the lower floors comprise 351 studio one- and two-bedroom units, ranging from 571 square feet (53.0 m^{2}) to 1,316 square feet (122.3 m^{2}). The Apex residences on the upper 15 floors include 139 one-, two- and three-bedroom units, as well as penthouse apartments, ranging from 747 square feet (69.4 m^{2}) to 2,583 square feet (240.0 m^{2}). The Apex units have "upgraded finishes and features" as well as private club access.

The entire building has access to two floors of athletic and social facilities. The building also has 58,000 square feet (5,400 m^{2}) of commercial space.

== See also ==
- Architecture of Chicago
- List of tallest buildings in Chicago
