= La Tercera =

Chilean newspaper

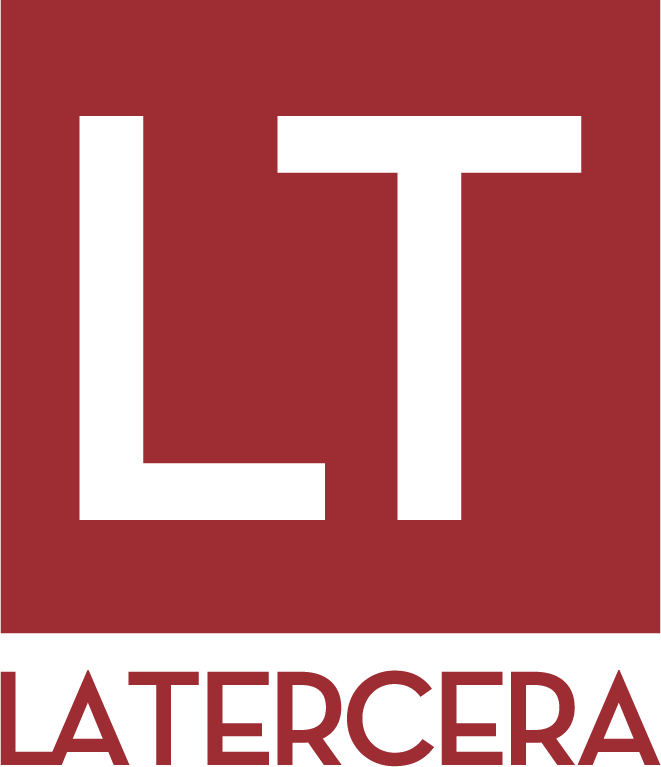

- Front page of La Tercera's 12 September 2013 edition.
- Type: Daily newspaper
- Format: Berliner
- Owner: Copesa
- Editor: Juan Pablo Larraín
- Founded: July 7, 1950; 76 years ago
- Political alignment: Moderate conservatism, Classical liberalism
- Headquarters: Apoquindo 4660, Las Condes, Santiago, Chile
- ISSN: 0717-8050
- Website: www.latercera.com

La Tercera (Spanish: The Third One), formerly known as La Tercera de la Hora (lit. 'The Third of the Hour'), is a daily newspaper published in Santiago, Chile and owned by Copesa. It is El Mercurio's closest competitor.

La Tercera is part of Periódicos Asociados Latinoamericanos (Latin American Newspaper Association), an organization of fourteen leading newspapers in South America.

== History ==
The newspaper La Tercera was founded on July 7, 1950, by the Picó Cañas family. Initially known as La Tercera de la Hora, it served as the evening edition of the now defunct newspaper La Hora. In the 1950s, it transitioned from being associated with La Hora and transformed into a morning paper. While initially affiliated with the Radical Party, La Tercera ended this association in 1965, becoming more politically independent and disconnected from any party, government system, or religious affiliation.

During the early 1970s, the newspaper strongly opposed Salvador Allende's government and supported the September 11 military coup in 1973, as well as General Augusto Pinochet's subsequent dictatorship. Alongside El Mercurio and La Nación, La Tercera played a significant role in endorsing these events. Throughout the following decades, it maintained a tabloid format and employed language that resonated with the middle class.

In 2003, La Tercera underwent changes, adopting the Berliner format and adopting a more formal language. The newspaper also increased its number of pages, aiming to appeal to a higher social stratum. In October 2007, it underwent further changes in layout design, adopting a minimalist appearance. Under the direction of Cristián Bofill, the newspaper specialized in covering political, business, and economic events.

In November 2008, the newspaper revamped its website, integrating all Copesa media into a single page called Mediacenter La Tercera. A month later, La Tercera joined the Strategic Alliances CNN Chile, forming an alliance with Radio Bío Bío, local TV channels, UCV TV, and the Network Mapcity Daily Citizen.

On August 1, 2010, La Tercera introduced a new header with red and white lettering, designed by Marcelo Godoy from Chile and Javier Errea from Spain. Starting from November 2, 2010, subscribers were able to access the International Edition of the Spanish newspaper El País upon payment of an additional fee. The current editor-in-chief of La Tercera is Juan Pablo Larraín Medina. On July 16, 2017, the newspaper relocated its offices from the historical site at Vicuña Mackenna 1962 (Ñuñoa) to a new building at Apoquindo 4660 (Las Condes).
