= Copesa =

Chilean media conglomerate

Consorcio Periodístico de Chile S.A.
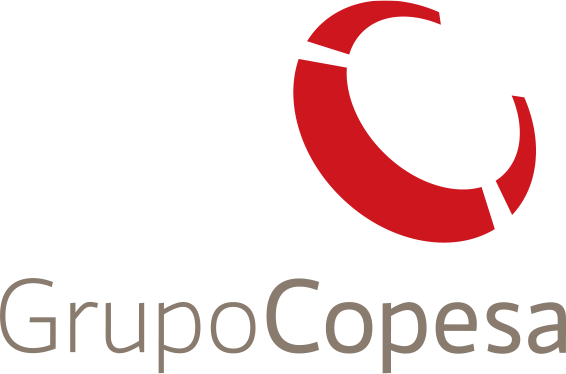
- Company type: Public
- Industry: Media
- Headquarters: Santiago, Chile
- Key people: Álvaro Saieh; Carlos Abumohor
- Products: Print; Television; Media
- Website: grupocopesa.cl

Copesa (Consorcio Periodístico de Chile) is one of the more important Chilean media conglomerates. Copesa is controlled by Álvaro Saieh, a Chilean businessman.

== Overview ==
Copesa was launched during the mid-1950s by the wealthy Pico-Cañas family. In the areas of newspaper circulation, El Mercurio and Copesa exert an unchallenged media duopoly in Chile. Copesa's success was largely the work of two prominent members of the Chilean right-wing political and business sector, Álvaro Saieh and Carlos Abumohor. In November 1988, the two investors joined forces with other businesspeople and members of the government to revamp the indebted conglomerate. Saieh became the largest shareholder with 33% while Abumohor held 16.6%. A month later, in December 1988, Saileh took control of the political magazine Que Pasa, which was incorporated into Copesa.

Copesa published the news daily La Tercera, which is the second most read newspaper in Chile. In 2002, La Tercera had a daily circulation of about 210,000. Copesa also published three other periodicals for national distribution: the popular magazine La Cuarta, the free daily tabloid La Hora, and the newsweekly Qué Pasa, which offered political analyses of current events. In 2002, Qué Pasa had an approximate circulation of 20 thousand readers. Copesa created websites on the Internet for its publications. The publisher also had affiliations with smaller-scale print and digital publishers. One such affiliation was with the digital company that produced "RadioZero," a music Internet site for younger audiences.

Copesa also owned Chilean airline Aeronor Chile.

== Non-media financial interests ==
Copesa has financial interests in other areas of the economy. Its investments have been largely channelled into the highly profitable private pension funds (Associación de Fondos de Pensiones or AFPs) and into real estate (Pena 1998). In 1992, the conglomerate entered into a joint venture with the printing and publishing house Ediciones Chiloé. As a result of this agreement, they established Distribución y Servicios Meta, a company that distributes newspapers, magazines and books. Through this structure Copesa is able to print and distribute its own products.

== See also ==
- Corpbanca
