= Arab Chileans =

Arab immigrants living in Chile

Total population
- Over 800,000

Regions with significant populations
- Valparaíso, La Serena, Santiago

Languages
- Chilean Spanish, Arabic

Religion
- Majority Eastern Orthodoxy · Catholicism, with Minority Sunni Islam and Shia Islam

Related ethnic groups
- Palestinians, Lebanese, Syrians

Arab Chileans (Spanish: Árabes Chilenos; Arabic: العرب في تشيلي) are Chileans from predominantly Arab ancestry. People from the Arab world arrived in Chile as early as the mid-19th century. Historically, the Arabs of Chile were called Turks, Moors, Syrians, Lebanese, or Palestinians.

It is estimated that 800,000 Chileans are chiefly descendants of immigrants from the Middle East (i.e., Palestinians, Syrians, Lebanese, and Middle East Armenians). Roughly 500,000 of these are Palestinian descendants. It is one of the largest Palestinian communities outside of the Arab world. Many of them are descendants from Christian immigrants from several places in the Levant. The earliest such migrants came in the 1850s, with others arriving during World War I and after the 1948 Arab–Israeli War. In April 2008, Chile took 117 Palestinian refugees from the Al-Waleed refugee camp.

Arab Chileans have been an influential group in Chilean society since the first half of the twentieth century. Starting in textile industry and trade, in the last quarter of the 20th century they formed holdings with important investments in finance, pension funds, insurance, real estate, retail and sports.

The community has established important institutions. The Club Palestino stands out as one of the most prestigious social clubs in Santiago. The Christian Orthodox built the Antiochian Orthodox Archdiocese of Santiago and All Chile in Santiago in 1917. It is a cathedral of the Church of Antioch with six parishes.

== History ==
The population census of 1895 was the first to register the presence of Arabs in Chile. Earlier records, in 1854 and 1885, identify Ottoman subjects, who may have been Lebanese, Palestinian, or Syrian, which were all subjects of the Ottoman Empire at the time. They were mostly Christians who left the Arab world for religious, political and economic motives.

Christians were persecuted in the Ottoman Empire during the 19th century. Arab Christians are descendants of ancient Middle Eastern ethnic groups, among the first adopters of Christianity, along with other ethnic groups, including the Assyrian minority in the Levant and Iraq, Armenian refugees in the Levant, Maronites in Lebanon, and Copts in Egypt. Ethnically Arab Chileans are often called "Turks" (Spanish: Turcos), a term derived from the fact that they arrived from the Ottoman Empire. Most arrived as members of the Eastern Orthodox church. Still, a minority adopted Catholicism, and a minority of the immigrants were Muslim.

The majority of Palestinians arrived in the early 20th century, fleeing the Ottoman Empire for religious, political and economic reasons, and because of the outbreak of the First World War. Not only Christians fled the Ottoman Empire for religious motives, also Shiite Muslims did. They arrived on South America's Atlantic coast and some continued the journey from Argentina to settle in Chile in the early 20th century.

On arrival in Chile, the Arabs found work primarily in the commercial sector. The Palestinian community, despite their cultural differences from Chilean society, managed to become part of the country's middle class, and some are among the wealthiest families of the country. At first, the Patronato neighbourhood in Santiago and the city of La Calera were the main locations where they lived and worked for many years. In recent times they have moved to various parts of Santiago such as Las Condes, Providencia, Ñuñoa, and Recoleta.

Most Arab immigrants arrived in Chile between 1860 and 1900. It is estimated that around one million Arabs came to America during this period. Before 1918, they held Turkish passports. They left from ports such as Beirut, Haifa, and Alexandria, and the journey was made via Genoa and Marseille. They settled mostly in Argentina, Brasil, Chile, Colombia and Venezuela. It is estimated that there are 25 million people of Arab descent in Latin America.

By 1940, the Guía Social de la Colonia Arabe en Chile estimated the number of Arabs in Chile at 13,466. 61% of the Arabs in Chile are people whose ancestors arrived between 1900 and 1930. Over 60% of Arabs who came to Chile were between 10 and 30 years old. In 1912, the Muerched, the first Chilean newspaper written in Arabic, began publication. It is estimated that there were at least 12 similar publications during the 40 years of immigration.

Arab Chileans not only are influential in Chile but also in Palestina. For example, 7 players who were Chilean-born Palestinians played for the Palestine national football team during the Asian qualifiers for the 2006 FIFA World Cup.

== Economic influence in Chile ==
Arab Chileans became very influential players in the Chilean economy in the 20th century. Two groups stand out:

=== Yarur family and Grupo Said ===
Juan Yarur Lolas emigrated from Bethlehem in 1894 and settled first in Bolivia. Together with Issa Zaid he started in 1926 a cotton manufacturing industry in La Paz. In 1934 Yarur moved to Chile and a year later, together with his brothers Nicolás and Saba, founded Manufacturas Chilenas de Algodón, S.A., better known as Machasa, a company that became the largest manufacturer of cotton yarn and fabrics in Chile. In 1937 Yarur founded Banco de Crédito e Inversiones, which became one of the largest banks in Chile. It is the fourth financial institution in Chile, with 11% of loans and returns on equity of 24%, and among the 20 largest banks in Latin America. In 2003 BCI acquired Banco Conosur at about U.S. $100 million.

Yarur had three sons: Carlos, Jorge and Amador. Jorge Yarur Banna eventually took over the management of Machasa and BCI after his father died. His partners were descendants from Issa Said, who had been partner of his father in Bolivia, and his six children, among them Salvador, the father of José Said Saffie, founder of the Parque Arauco shopping mall-amusement park and BHIF.

José Said Saffie multiplied the family fortune and created Grupo Said. He became one of the wealthiest persons in Chile and Latin America, as owner of 21% of Parque Arauco, 16% BHIF Bank-BBVA Chile, which concentrates 7% of loans, 25% of Andina Bottling, 30% of Factorline, factoring the fourth largest in the country, 48% of Edelpa, the largest flexible packaging and 50% of Clínica Reñaca. Parque Arauco owned 27% of Alto Palermo, a company that manages shopping centers in Argentina, including Patio Bullrich.

Apart from the groups spearheading the cousins José Said Saffie, Jaime Said Demaria and their uncle, Domingo Said Kattan, there is another branch that descends from the businessman born in Bethlehem Issa Said Sahuire: that of Antonio Said Kattan, brother of Domingo. This is the only branch still active in the textile sector, as Fibratex Textiles Manufacturing.

=== CorpGroup Banking (CGB) ===
In 1986, a group of businessmen who called themselves the Ten Mosques, acquired Banco Osorio y La Unión, conscious that the textile industry was in decline. They were Carlos Abumohor, Espir Aguad, Alejandro Kauak, Munir Khamis, Selum Jorge Fernando Abuhadba, Odde Rishmague with Salomón and Domingo Díaz and Álvaro Saieh with Juan Rafael Gutiérrez (the only non-Arab). They formed Arab Investment, a financial firm where the individual contribution was U.S. $1 million. Saieh was the manager. His holding, which came to be known as CorpGroup, reached a peak in the period 2010–2013, year in which CGB issued a ten-year US$500 million bond. By 2021 the group faced serious challenges and Saieh filed for bankruptcy.

The rise of the group began in 1988 when Banco Osorio y La Union took over Banco del Trabajo, making it the third largest bank in Chile. In the early 1990s the "Ten Mosques" formed subgroups to start new businesses. First was the purchase of AFP Provida, in 1993. This group later purchased Interbanc in Peru. In 1995 was the holding Inversiones Financieras SA (Infisa) created, where Saieh kept 51% of the property. In 1997, seeking to give a new image and profile, the Concepción was renamed Infisa Corpbanca and became the holding Corpgroup.

CorpGroup and the business ventures of the Ten Mosques in finance, real estate, pension funds, insurance, retail and sports were major forces in the Chilean economy around the turn of the 21st century.

== Chilean Arab organizations ==
- Sports: Club Deportivo Palestino, founded in 1920
- Sociedad de Beneficencia Juventud Homsiense, founded in 1913.
- Social Club Palestinian (1938), Bethlehem 2000 Palestinian Foundation-Chile (2001)
- Policy: Palestinian Federation of Chile and the General Union of Palestinian Students in Chile (UGEP-Chile)
- General Union of Palestinian Students in Chile (UGEP-Chile)
- AJPP (Youth Association for Palestine)
- United Syrian Club (Club Sirio Unido)
- Union Club Palestinian Valparaíso and Viña del Mar
- La décima, Arab Chilean Fire Brigade
- Ladies Syrian Palestinian Society.
- Arab Union Club La Calera
- Palestine Bethlehem Foundation 2000
- Home of Syrian-Palestinian Children
- Palestinian Union Club de Talca
- Palestinian Union Club of San Fernando
- Arab Stadium Design
- JUPAC (Youth Palestinian Concepción)
- Palestinian Conception School
- Palestinian College of Viña del Mar

== Notable Arab Chileans ==
- Rolando Chuaqui, mathematician, spearheaded the creation and expansion of mathematics departments across multiple Chilean universities (of Syrian descent)
- Sergio Bitar, former Minister of Education (of Syrian descent)
- Daniela Nicolás, model, actress and beauty pageant titleholder who won Miss Universe Chile 2020 (born to Lebanese parents)
- Arturo Salah, a Chilean former football player (of Palestinian descent)
- Aníbal Mosa, entrepreneur and President of Blanco y Negro S.A. (of Syrian descent)
- Carlos Abumohor, businessman and investor (Palestinian descent)
- Mario Hamuy, Professor of Astronomy at the University of Chile (of Syrian descent)
- José Said, businessman (of Palestinian descent)
- Sergio Valech, Roman Catholic bishop (Syrian descent)
- Alia Trabucco Zerán, writer (of Syrian and Palestinian descent)
- Mariana Derderián, actress (Armenian Syrian descent)
- Miguel Littín, movie director and screenwriter
- Álvaro Saieh, businessman
- Daniel Jadue, politician (of Palestinian descent)
- Roberto Bishara, footballer (of Palestinian descent)
- Nicolás Massú, tennis player (Palestinian descent from his father's side and Jewish on his mother's side)
- Fernando Solabarrieta Chelech, journalist, TV host (Palestinian descent)
- Nayel Mehssatou, Chilean footballer

== See also ==
- Arab diaspora
- Immigration to Chile
- Palestinian community in Chile
- Lebanese Chileans
