= Palestinians in Chile =

Chilean part of the Palestinian diaspora

فلسطينيو تشيلي; Palestinos en Chile
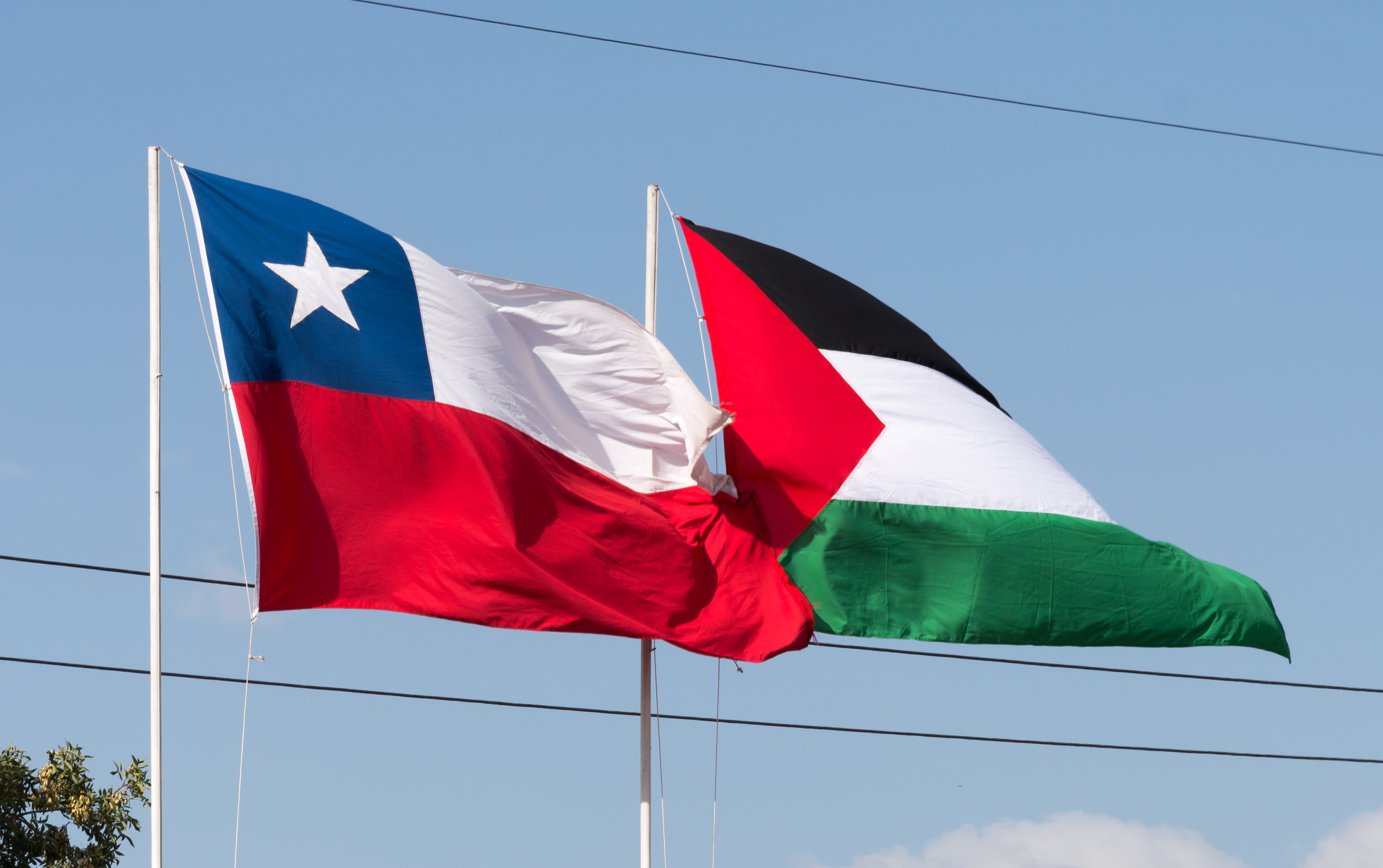
- Flags of Chile and Palestine

Total population
- 450,000 - 500,000 (about ~2.7% of the population of 18 million)

Regions with significant populations
- Santiago, La Calera

Languages
- Spanish, Arabic

Religion
- Majority Christianity (Eastern Orthodoxy, Catholicism); Minority Islam

Related ethnic groups
- Arab Chileans

Palestinians in Chile (Arabic: فلسطينيو تشيلي; Spanish: palestinos en Chile) are believed to be the largest Palestinian community outside of the Arab world. There are around 6 million Palestinians living in diaspora, mainly in the Middle East. There are estimated to be around 450,000 and 500,000 people of Palestinian descent in Chile.

== History ==
The initial migration of Palestinians to Chile began in the late 19th century under Ottoman rule. Emigration from the region, which also included Syrian and Lebanese migrants, was driven by economic hardship, the decline of the Ottoman Empire, and political repression against early Arab nationalist movements, alongside conflicts such as the Crimean War. Early arrivals worked primarily in agriculture and commerce. Successive waves of Palestinian immigrants arrived during World War I and following the 1948 Palestine war and partition.

They were primarily Christians from Beit Jala, Bethlehem, and Beit Sahour. Most landed at Argentine ports and crossed the Andes by mule into Chile. They were often called turcos (Spanish for Turks) as citizens of the Ottoman Empire. Contrary to the immigration of Germans and other western European nationalities, the arrival of Palestinians was not welcomed. The state was experiencing a severe social and economic crisis as well as a wave of nationalism with xenophobic and racist undertones. Immigrants were described in denigrating terms by the Chilean press. El Mercurio wrote in 1911: "Whether they are Mohammedans or Buddhists, what one can see and smell from far, is that they are more dirty than the dogs of Constantinople."

Many of the immigrants were poor and illiterate and had to take loans to pay their travel costs. Once in Chile, they settled on the outskirts of cities and worked as small merchants. In the 1950s by the time of the second government of Carlos Ibáñez del Campo many Palestinian-Chileans had acquired substantial economic as well as political power in Chile, some working as deputies, ministers or ambassadors.

Aside from these migrants of previous decades, Chile has also taken in some Palestinian refugees in later years, as in April 2008 when it received 117 from the Al-Waleed refugee camp on the Syria–Iraq border near the Al-Tanf crossing. All of those refugees were Sunni Muslims.

People who hold a diplomatic or official Palestinian passport can visit Chile as tourists for up to 90 days, without a visa.

== Religion ==
The vast majority of the Palestinian community in Chile follow Christianity. The largest denomination is Orthodox Christian followed by Roman Catholic, and the number of Palestinian Christians in the diaspora in Chile alone exceeds the number of those who have remained in their homeland. One early Palestinian church in Santiago, the Iglesia Ortodoxa San Jorge, was founded in 1917. The rest are Sunni Muslims.

== Community organizations ==
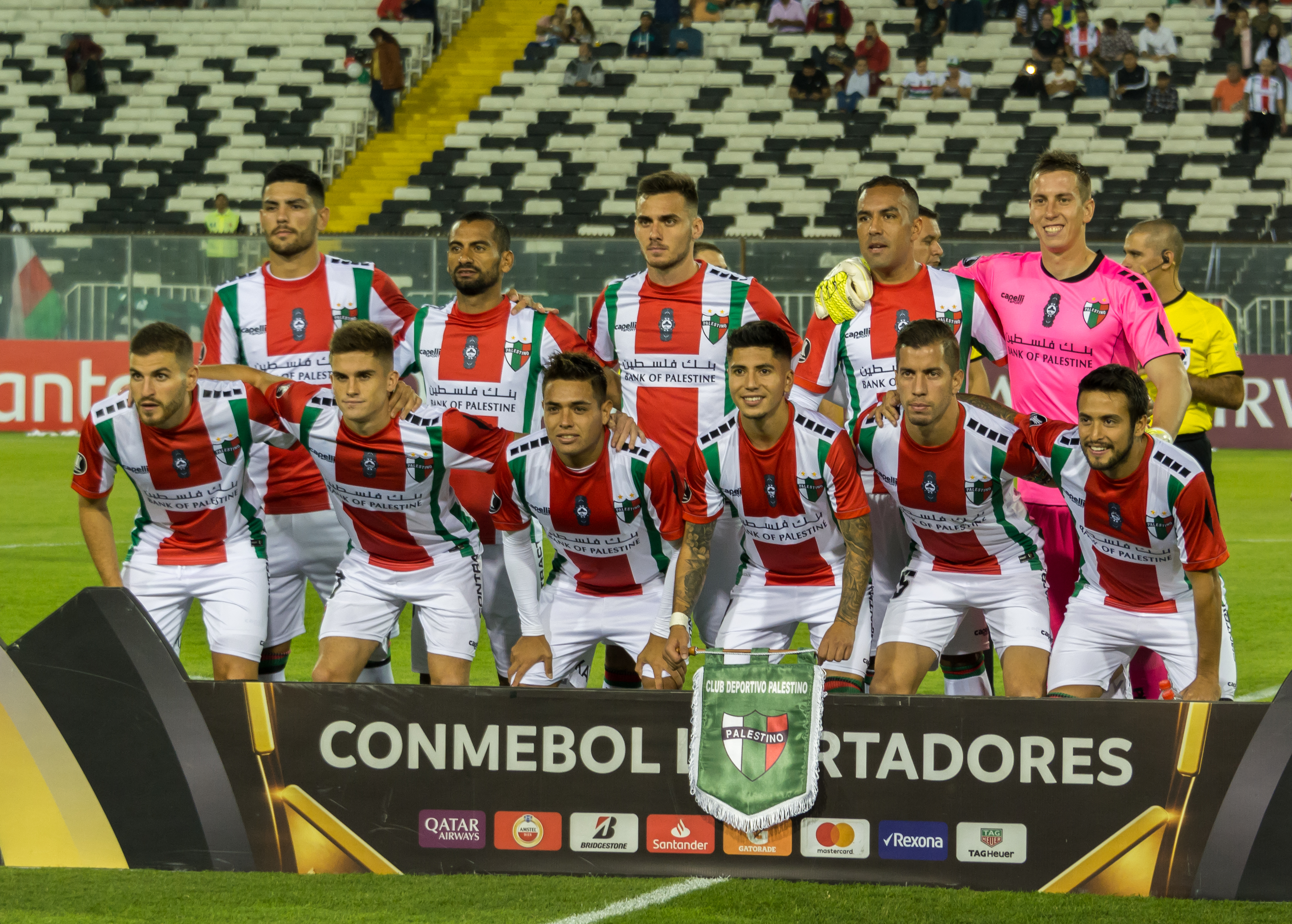
Club Deportivo Palestino has won twice the Chilean football league and reached the semi-finals of the Copa Libertadores.

The Club Palestino is one of the most prestigious social clubs in Santiago; it offers swimming, tennis, and dining facilities to its members. There is also a soccer team, C.D. Palestino, whose uniform is in the traditional Palestinian colours red, green, and white. The team has been champion of the Chilean Primera División twice. Also, some Chilean-Palestinian footballers like Roberto Bishara and Alexis Norambuena have played for the Palestine national football team. Other Chileans of Palestinian origin, such as Luis Antonio Jiménez, played international football for Chile and several foreign clubs.

A number of Palestinians in Chile have shown significant concern with the situation of Palestine, for example, the president of the Cámara de Comercio (chamber of commerce) of the Barrio Patronato, himself a Palestinian, in 2006 organised a protest regarding the 2006 Lebanon War; Lebanese and Palestinian flags were widely seen in the neighbourhood's streets at that time. On another occasion, outside the Club Palestino and again in front of the Colegio Árabe, someone wrote on the sidewalk "Árabe=terrorismo" ("Arabs=terrorism") and "Palestina no existe" ("Palestine does not exist").

In August 2025, the Palestine Football Association relocated its base of operations to the country due to the large diaspora in the country as well as its distance from the Gaza war.

== In literature ==
A number of Chilean novels have featured Palestinian characters and discussed the experience of Palestinian immigrants in the country, such as El viajero de la alfombra mágica by Walter Garib, Los turcos by Roberto Sarah, and Peregrino de ojos brillantes, by Jaime Hales.

== Notable people ==
- Edgardo Abdala, footballer
- Carlos Abumohor, businessman and investor
- Roberto Bishara Adawi, footballer
- Francisco Chahuán, politician
- Diamela Eltit, writer
- Cardinal Fernando Chomalí Garib, Roman Catholic Archbishop of Santiago
- Daud Gazale, footballer
- Annemarie Jacir, movie director and photographer
- Daniel Jadue, politician
- Matías Jadue, footballer
- Sergio Jadue, football executive
- Luis Antonio Jiménez, footballer
- Roberto Kettlun Beshe, footballer
- Miguel Littin, movie director and screenwriter
- Lina Meruane, writer
- Nelly Meruane, actress
- Ricardo Meruane, humorist
- Luis Musrri, footballer
- Miguel Nasur Allel, businessman and football club owner
- Christopher Penroz, footballer
- José Said, businessman
- Álvaro Saieh, businessman
- Arturo Salah, former football player
- Fernando Solabarrieta Chelech, journalist, TV presenter
- Rafael Tarud Siwady, politician
- José Zalaquett Daher, lawyer
- Leonardo Harum Amaro, footballer
- Marko Zaror, martial artist, actor
- Elyanna (née Elian Amer Marjieh), singer and songwriter

== See also ==
- Chile–Palestine relations
- Arab Chileans
- Lebanese Chileans
- Immigration to Chile
