= Southern Cone =

Southern subregion of South America

- Countries always included in all definitions Areas sometimes included Federative units of Brazil not included
- Area: 5,712,034 km^{2} (2,205,429 sq mi)
- Population: ▲135,707,204 (July 2010 est.) (Note: Including the Brazilian states of Paraná, Santa Catarina, Rio Grande do Sul, and São Paulo.)
- Density: 27.45/km^{2} (71.1/sq mi)
- Countries: 3–4: Argentina; Chile; Paraguay (Note: Sometimes included.); Uruguay
- Territories: External (2): Falkland Islands (Note: Sometimes included. A disputed territory administered by the United Kingdom, claimed by Argentina as the Islas Malvinas.) (United Kingdom); South Georgia and the South Sandwich Islands (Note: Sometimes included. A disputed territory administered by the United Kingdom, claimed by Argentina.) (United Kingdom); Internal (4): Paraná (Brazil); Rio Grande do Sul (Brazil); Santa Catarina (Brazil); São Paulo (Brazil)
- Languages: Spanish, Portuguese, Italian, English, German, Aymara, Guaraní, Mapudungun, and Quechuan
- Demonym: South American
- Largest cities: Capitals in the Southern Cone (2015): 1. (Chile) Santiago; 2. (Argentina) Buenos Aires; 3. (Uruguay) Montevideo

The Southern Cone (Spanish: Cono Sur, Portuguese: Cone Sul) is a geographical and cultural subregion composed of the southernmost areas of South America, mostly south of the Tropic of Capricorn. Traditionally, it covers Argentina, Chile, and Uruguay, bounded on the west by the Pacific Ocean and on the east by the Atlantic Ocean. In terms of geography, the Southern Cone comprises Argentina, Chile, and Uruguay, and sometimes includes Paraguay and Brazil's four southernmost states (Paraná, Rio Grande do Sul, Santa Catarina, and São Paulo).

The Southern Cone is the subregion with the second highest Human Development Index and standard of living in the Americas, after Northern America.

== Geography and extent ==
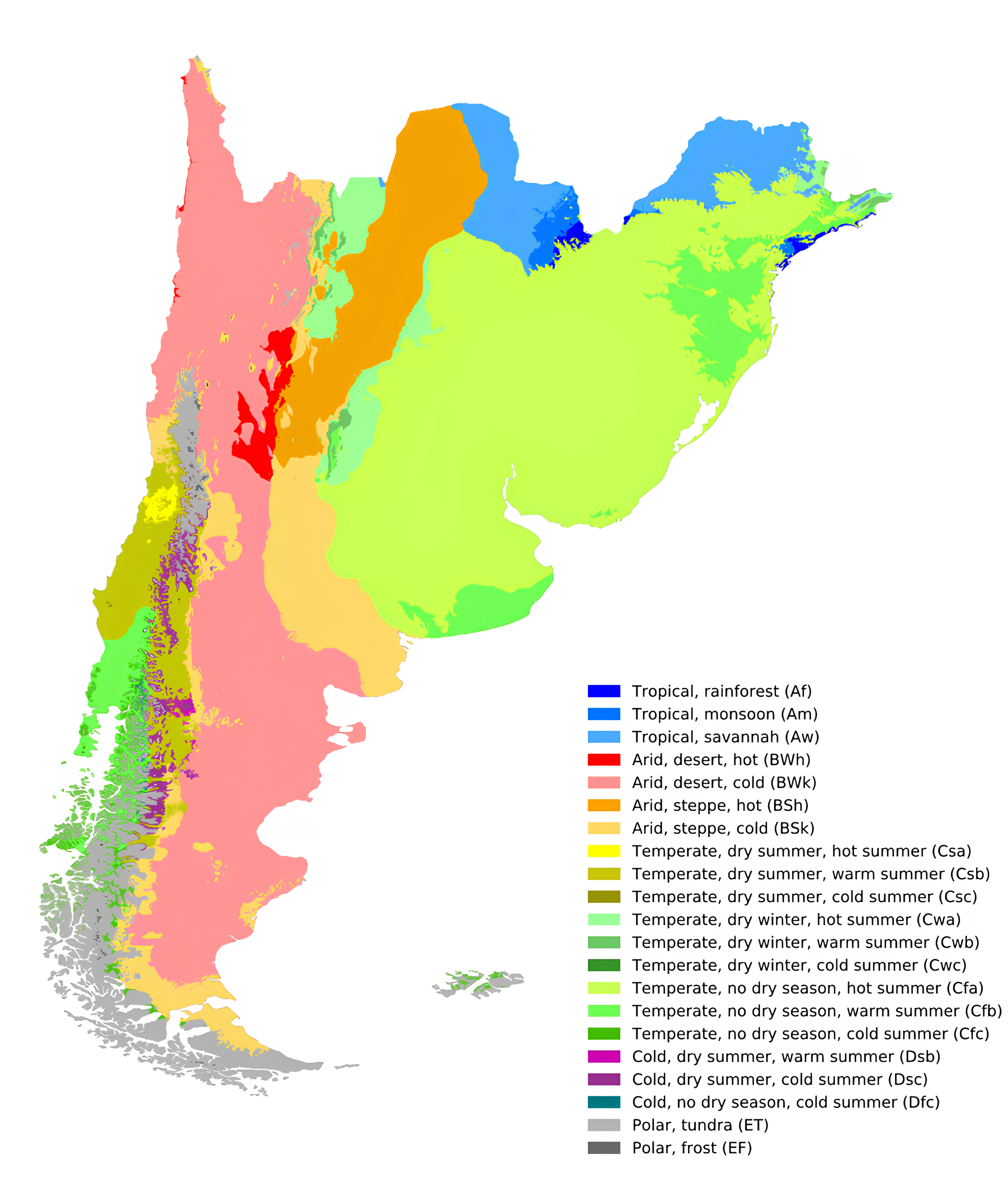
Köppen Climate Zone Classification map of Southern Cone.

=== Countries ===
In most cases, the term "Southern Cone" refers specifically to Chile, Argentina, and Uruguay, due to their geographical, cultural, ethnic, and economic similarities.

Country	Area (km^{2})	Population (2020)	Population density (per km^{2})	HDI (2023)	Capital
Argentina	2,780,092 (3,761,274)	45,195,774	16.26 (12.02)	0.865 (very high)	Buenos Aires
Chile	756,102 (2,006,360)	19,116,201	25.28 (9.53)	0.878 (very high)	Santiago
Uruguay	176,215	3,473,730	19.71	0.862 (very high)	Montevideo
Total	3,712,409 (5,943,849)	67,785,705	18.26 (11.40)	0.869 (very high)	

=== Other regions ===
==== Brazil ====
Brazil's four southernmost states (Paraná, Rio Grande do Sul, Santa Catarina and São Paulo) share characteristics with Argentina, and Uruguay (similar local climate, high standard of living, high levels of industrialization and greater percentage European ethnic component due to immigration). Brazil's other states are more similar to the other South American countries in these issues.

When the definition is not limited to entire countries, the states of the South Region and the state of São Paulo are generally included.

State	Area (km^{2})	Population (2019)	Population density (per km^{2})	HDI (2024)	Capital
(Paraná (state)) Paraná	199,314	11.434.000	59.80	0.822 (very high)	Curitiba
Rio Grande do Sul	291,748	11.378.000	39.10	0.818 (very high)	Porto Alegre
(Santa Catarina (state)) Santa Catarina	95,346	7.165.000	71.18	0.833 (very high)	Florianópolis
(São Paulo (state)) São Paulo	248,222	45,920,000	95.83	0.838 (very high)	São Paulo
Total	834,630	75.897.000	90.35	0.827 (very high)	

==== Paraguay ====
Due to the geographical proximity, common history, geography and political cycles, Paraguay is sometimes included in what is meant by Southern Cone, geographically speaking, but excluded due to differences in climate, economy and development, and cultural identity. While Chile, Argentina, Uruguay, and Southern Brazil are located in the southernmost part of South America, with temperate climates and a dominant European ancestry shaping their demographics and culture, Paraguay is a landlocked country further north, with a subtropical climate and a unique cultural identity rooted in its Guaraní heritage. Economically, Paraguay has a lower Human Development Index (HDI) compared to the Southern Cone countries, which rank among the highest in Latin America. Paraguay’s economy, focused on agriculture and hydroelectric power, is also less diversified and globally integrated.

=== Climate ===
The climates are mostly Mediterranean temperate, but include humid subtropical, highland tropical, maritime temperate, sub-Antarctic temperate, highland cold, desert and semi-arid temperate regions. (Except for the northern regions of Argentina (thermal equator in January), the whole country of Paraguay, the Argentina-Brazil border and the interior of the Atacama Desert). The region rarely suffers from heat. In addition to that, the winter presents mostly cold temperatures. Strong and constant wind and high humidity are what brings low temperatures in the winter.

One of the most peculiar plants of the region is the Araucaria tree, which can be found in Chile, Argentina and parts of Brazil. The only native group of conifers found in the southern hemisphere had its origin in the Southern Cone. Araucaria angustifolia, once widespread in Southern Brazil, is now a critically endangered species, protected by law. The prairies region of central Argentina, Uruguay and southern Brazil is known as the Pampas.

Central Chile has Mediterranean vegetation and a Mediterranean climate, grading southward into an oceanic climate. The Atacama, Patagonian and Monte deserts form a diagonal of arid lands separating the woodlands, croplands and pastures of La Plata basin from Central and Southern Chile. Apart from the desert diagonal, the north–south running Andes form a major divide in the Southern Cone and constitute, for most of its part in the southern cone, the Argentina–Chile border. In the east the river systems of the La Plata basin form natural barriers and sea lanes between Argentina, Brazil, Paraguay and Uruguay.

The Atacama Desert is the driest place on Earth, with some regions having no recorded rainfall in history.

Average temperatures for some urban areas of the Southern Cone
Location	January	April	July	October
Buenos Aires	30.1 °C (86.2 °F); 20.1 °C (68.2 °F)	22.9 °C (73.2 °F); 13.8 °C (56.8 °F)	15.4 °C (59.7 °F); 7.4 °C (45.3 °F)	22.6 °C (72.7 °F); 13.3 °C (55.9 °F)
Santiago	30.1 °C (86.2 °F); 13.4 °C (56.1 °F)	22.3 °C (72.1 °F); 6.5 °C (43.7 °F)	14.3 °C (57.7 °F); 1.6 °C (34.9 °F)	22.8 °C (73.0 °F); 8.4 °C (47.1 °F)
Montevideo	28.1 °C (82.6 °F); 18.0 °C (64.4 °F)	21.7 °C (71.1 °F); 12.9 °C (55.2 °F)	14.6 °C (58.3 °F); 6.9 °C (44.4 °F)	20.3 °C (68.5 °F); 11.5 °C (52.7 °F)
Córdoba	31.1 °C (88.0 °F); 18.1 °C (64.6 °F)	24.9 °C (76.8 °F); 12.3 °C (54.1 °F)	18.5 °C (65.3 °F); 5.5 °C (41.9 °F)	26.1 °C (79.0 °F); 12.6 °C (54.7 °F)
Valparaíso	21.4 °C (70.5 °F); 13.5 °C (56.3 °F)	18.3 °C (64.9 °F); 11.4 °C (52.5 °F)	14.3 °C (57.7 °F); 9.2 °C (48.6 °F)	17.0 °C (62.6 °F); 10.5 °C (50.9 °F)
Concepción	22.8 °C (73.0 °F); 10.9 °C (51.6 °F)	18.3 °C (64.9 °F); 8.1 °C (46.6 °F)	13.2 °C (55.8 °F); 5.8 °C (42.4 °F)	17.2 °C (63.0 °F); 7.4 °C (45.3 °F)
Mar del Plata	26.3 °C (79.3 °F); 14.3 °C (57.7 °F)	20.5 °C (68.9 °F); 9.1 °C (48.4 °F)	13.1 °C (55.6 °F); 3.8 °C (38.8 °F)	18.5 °C (65.3 °F); 7.6 °C (45.7 °F)
Neuquén	32.0 °C (89.6 °F); 16.2 °C (61.2 °F)	22.0 °C (71.6 °F); 7.0 °C (44.6 °F)	12.2 °C (54.0 °F); 0.0 °C (32.0 °F)	23.4 °C (74.1 °F); 8.2 °C (46.8 °F)
Iquique	25.3 °C (77.5 °F); 19.2 °C (66.6 °F)	22.7 °C (72.9 °F); 16.9 °C (62.4 °F)	18.0 °C (64.4 °F); 14.0 °C (57.2 °F)	20.1 °C (68.2 °F); 15.4 °C (59.7 °F)
Bariloche	21.4 °C (70.5 °F); 6.5 °C (43.7 °F)	14.8 °C (58.6 °F); 1.8 °C (35.2 °F)	6.4 °C (43.5 °F) −1.3 °C (29.7 °F)	13.9 °C (57.0 °F); 1.3 °C (34.3 °F)
Ushuaia	13.9 °C (57.0 °F); 5.4 °C (41.7 °F)	9.6 °C (49.3 °F); 2.3 °C (36.1 °F)	4.2 °C (39.6 °F) −1.7 °C (28.9 °F)	10.5 °C (50.9 °F); 2.3 °C (36.1 °F)
Porto Alegre	30.2 °C (86.4 °F); 20.5 °C (68.9 °F)	25.2 °C (77.4 °F); 16.3 °C (61.3 °F)	19.4 °C (66.9 °F); 10.7 °C (51.3 °F)	24.4 °C (75.9 °F); 15.0 °C (59.0 °F)

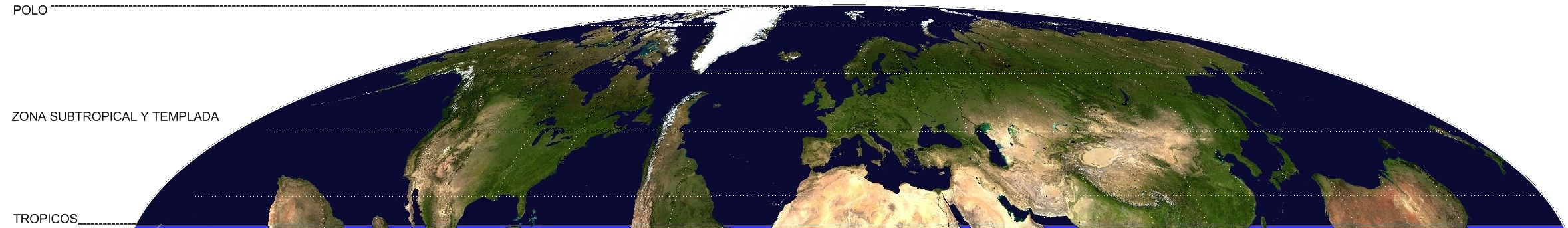
Planisphere of moderate latitudes in which the equivalent location of most of the Southern Cone can be observed as if it was in the Northern Hemisphere. The highest latitudes of the Southern Cone overlap among others with Southeast Alaska and central region of Canada in North America, Ireland, England, the Netherlands, Northern Germany, Poland and Belarus in Europe, and the Altai Mountains and Lake Baikal, Sakhalin and the Kuril Islands in Asia.

=== Image gallery ===
Satellite images of the Southern Cone month by month.

Landforms in the Monte Desert at Ischigualasto, Argentina. Much of the southern cone is covered by the Arid Diagonal of which Monte Desert is part.

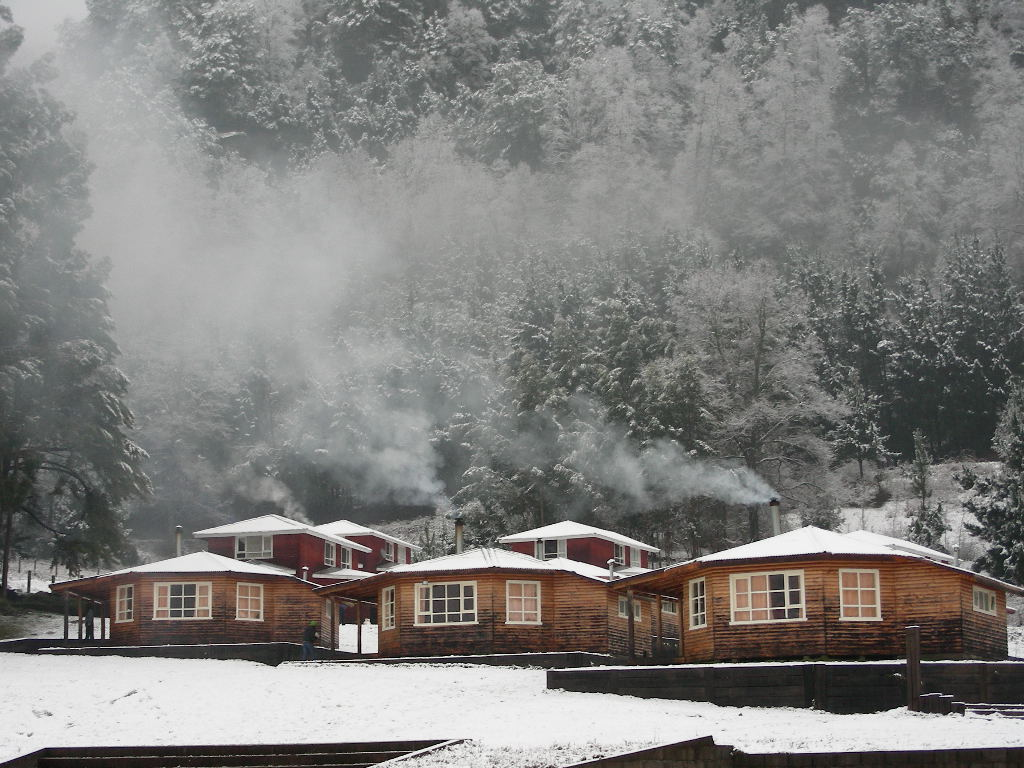
Snow in the winter in Curarrehue, Chile.

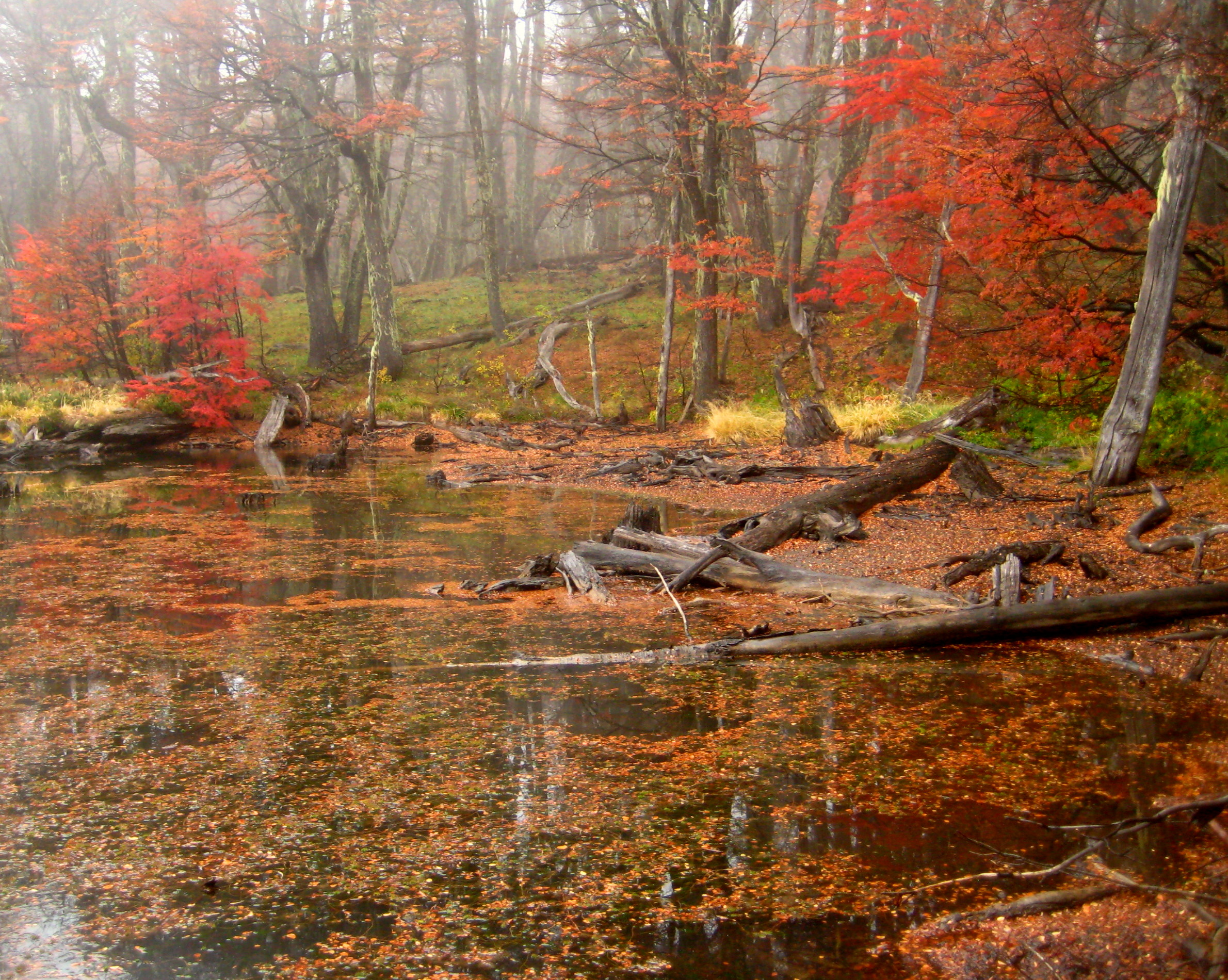
Autumn in Bariloche, Argentina.

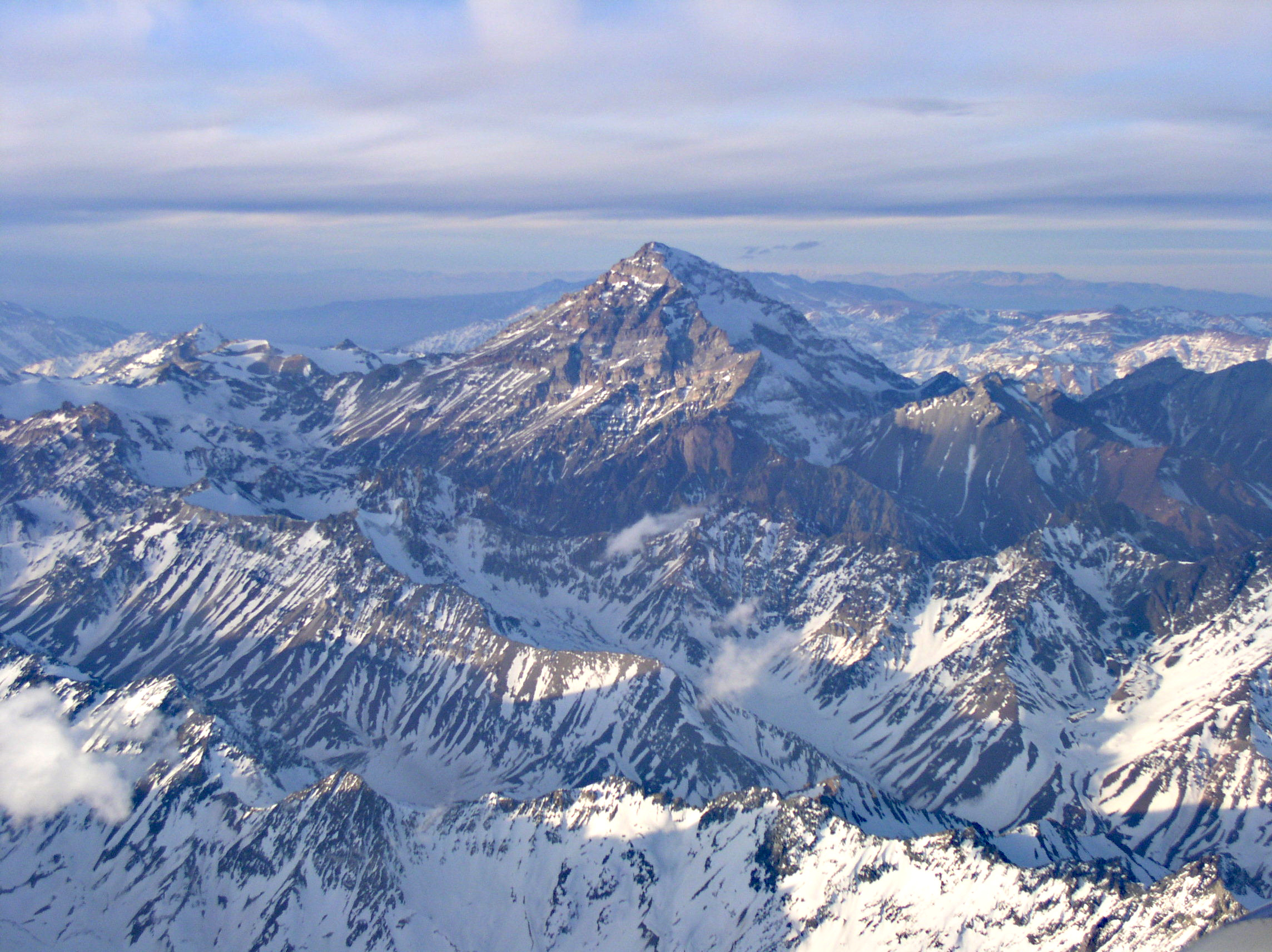
Located in between Chile and Argentina, Aconcagua, almost 7000 meters high, is the highest mountain on Earth outside the Himalayas, and continues to rise.

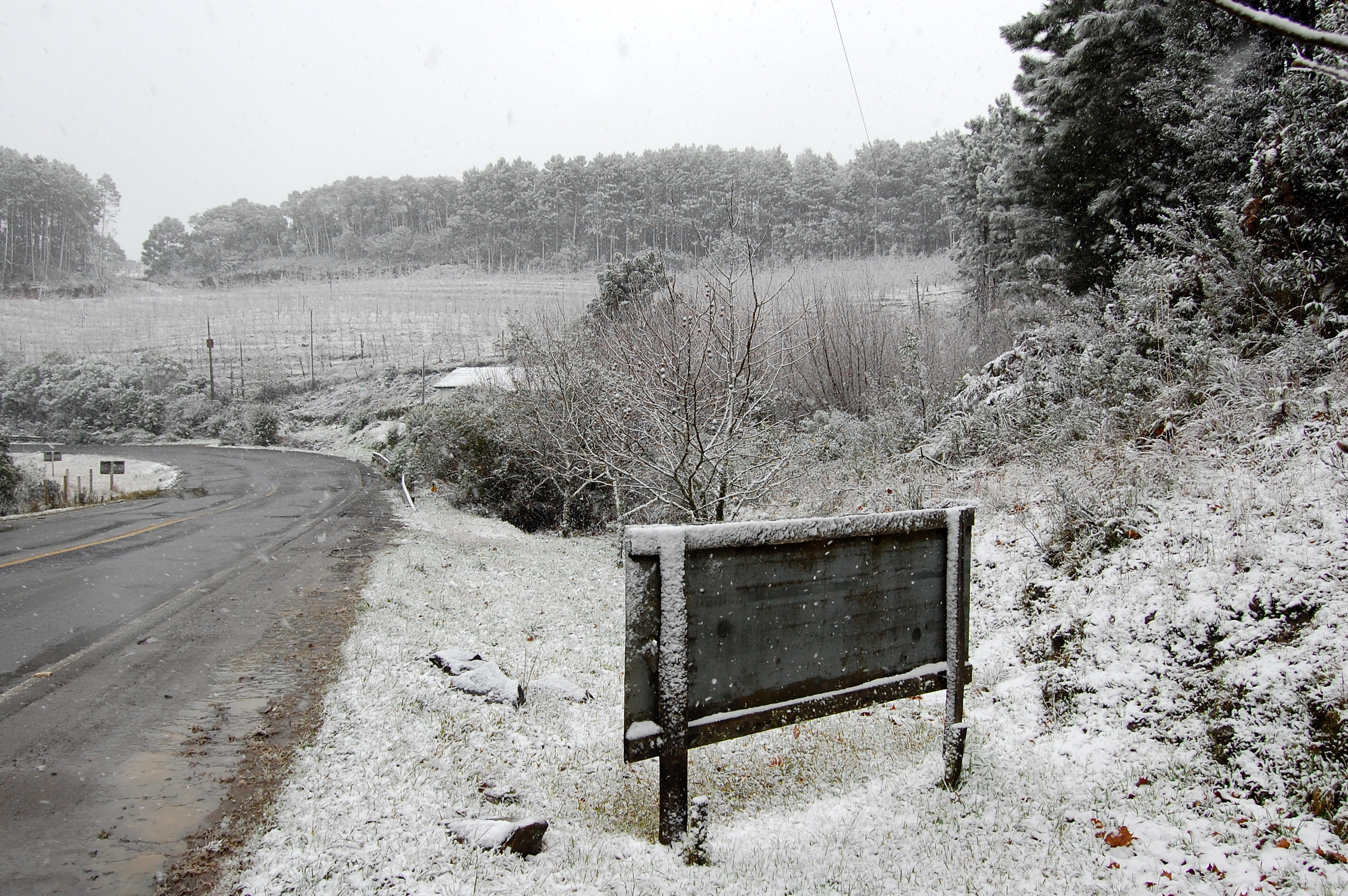
Snow in the winter of the Planalto Serrano mountain range of the state of Santa Catarina, southern Brazil.

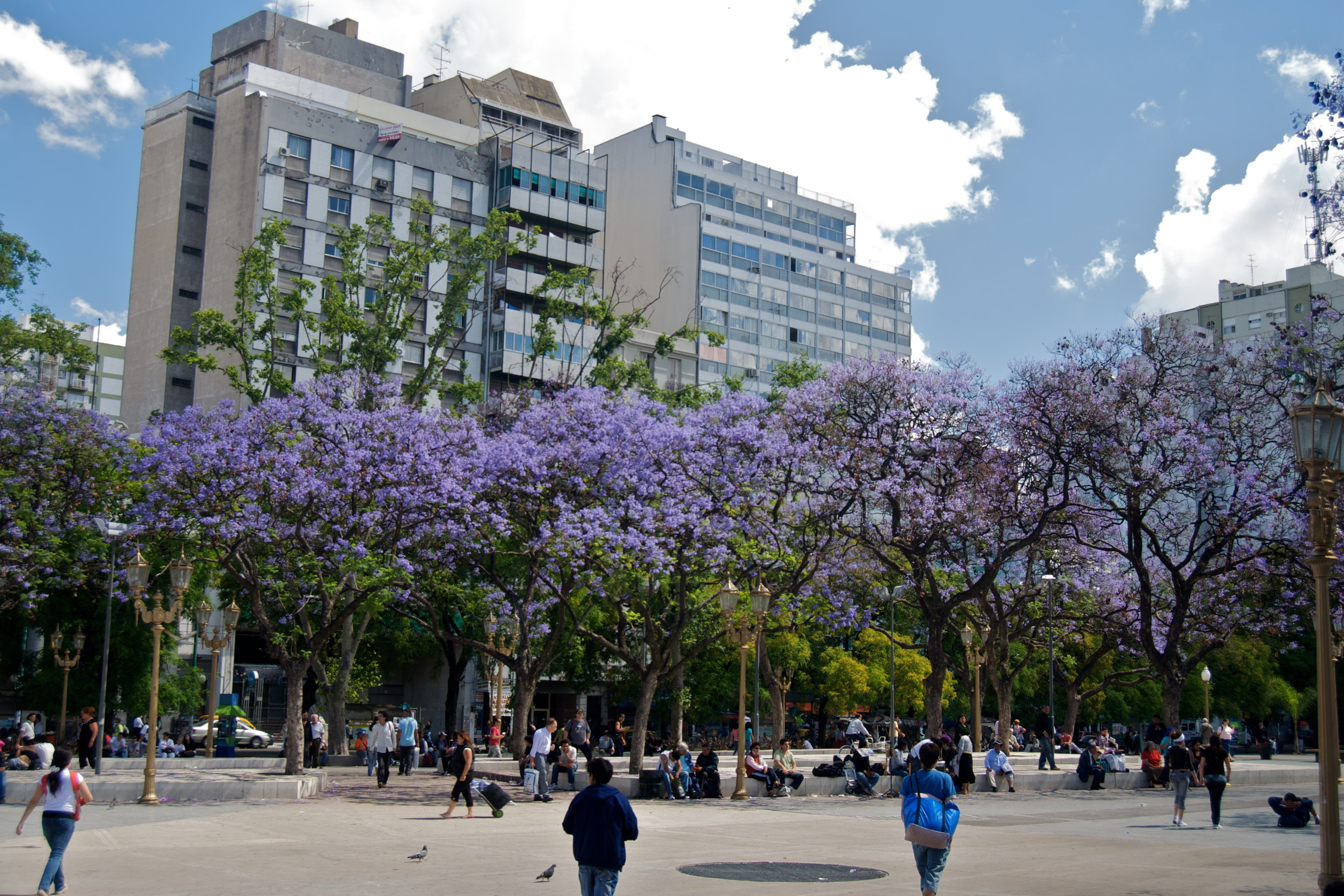
Jacarandas in bloom in Buenos Aires, Argentina during spring.

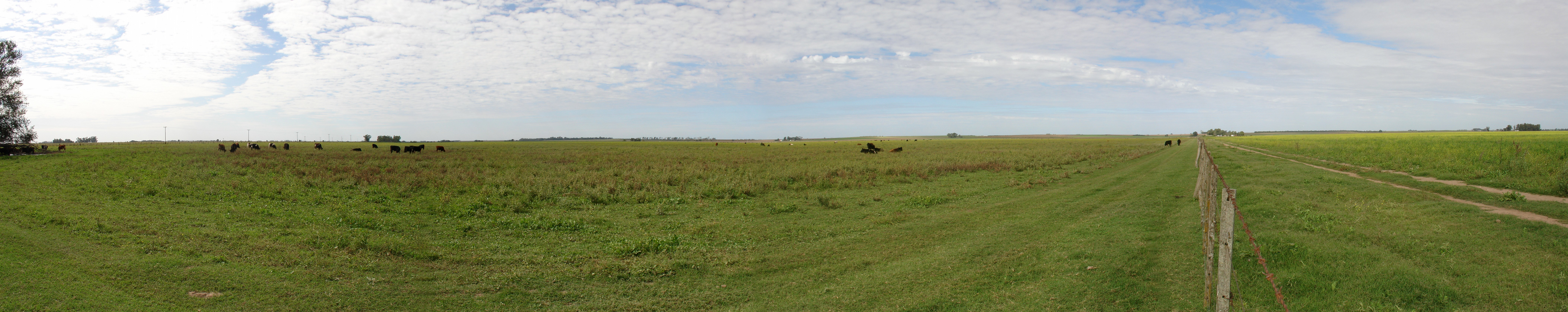
The extensive temperate prairies of the Pampas in the center of Argentina.

== Culture ==
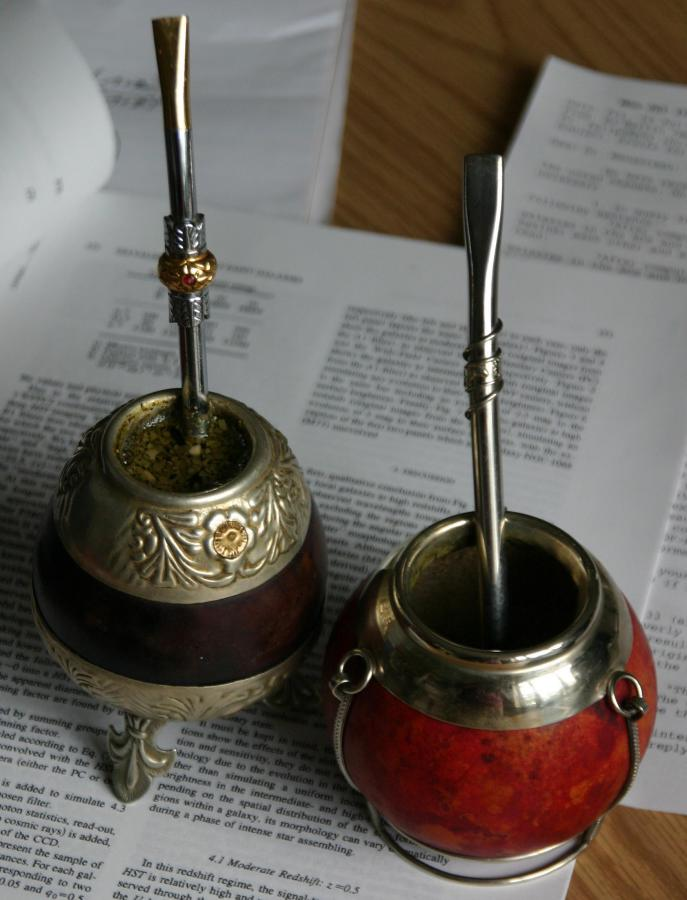
Mate, as shown in the picture, is a typical beverage from the Southern Cone.

Besides sharing languages and colonial heritage, in this area there was extensive European and Middle Eastern immigration during the 19th- and 20th-centuries. Those immigrants and their descendants have strongly influenced the culture, social life, and politics of these countries. Immigration reshaped the modern-day societies of Argentina, Chile, and Uruguay, countries where the influx of newcomers was massive.

The residents of the states of the Southern Cone are avid players and fans of association football, with top-notch teams competing in the sport. Argentina has won the FIFA World Cup three times, while Uruguay has won the cup twice; they are the only national teams along with Brazil outside Europe to have won the cup. Argentina, Chile, Uruguay, and Brazil have all hosted the World Cup. Additionally, national teams from the region have won several Olympic medals in football. Also, football clubs from the Southern Cone countries have won large numbers of club competitions in South-American competitions, Pan-American competitions, and world-FIFA Club World Cup-level competitions.

Gauchos (Argentina and Uruguay) and Huasos (Chile) are horsemen who are considered icons of national identity (like cowboys); they are featured in the epic poem Martín Fierro.

=== Gastronomy ===
The Asado (barbecue) is a culinary tradition typical of the Southern Cone main countries and was developed by gauchos and huasos.

Mate is a popular infusion throughout the Southern Cone.

=== Religion ===
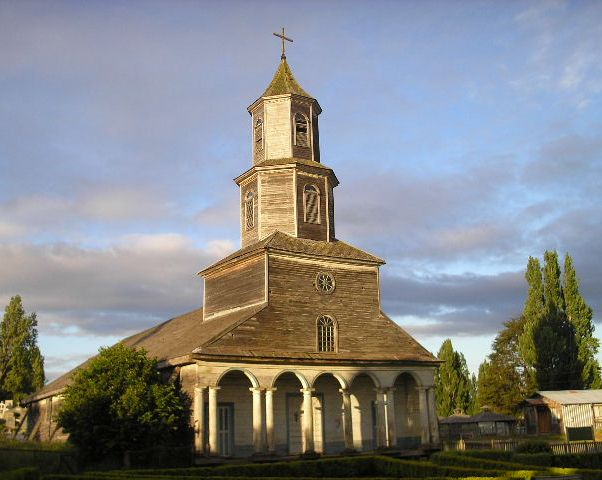
Church of Nercón, Chile

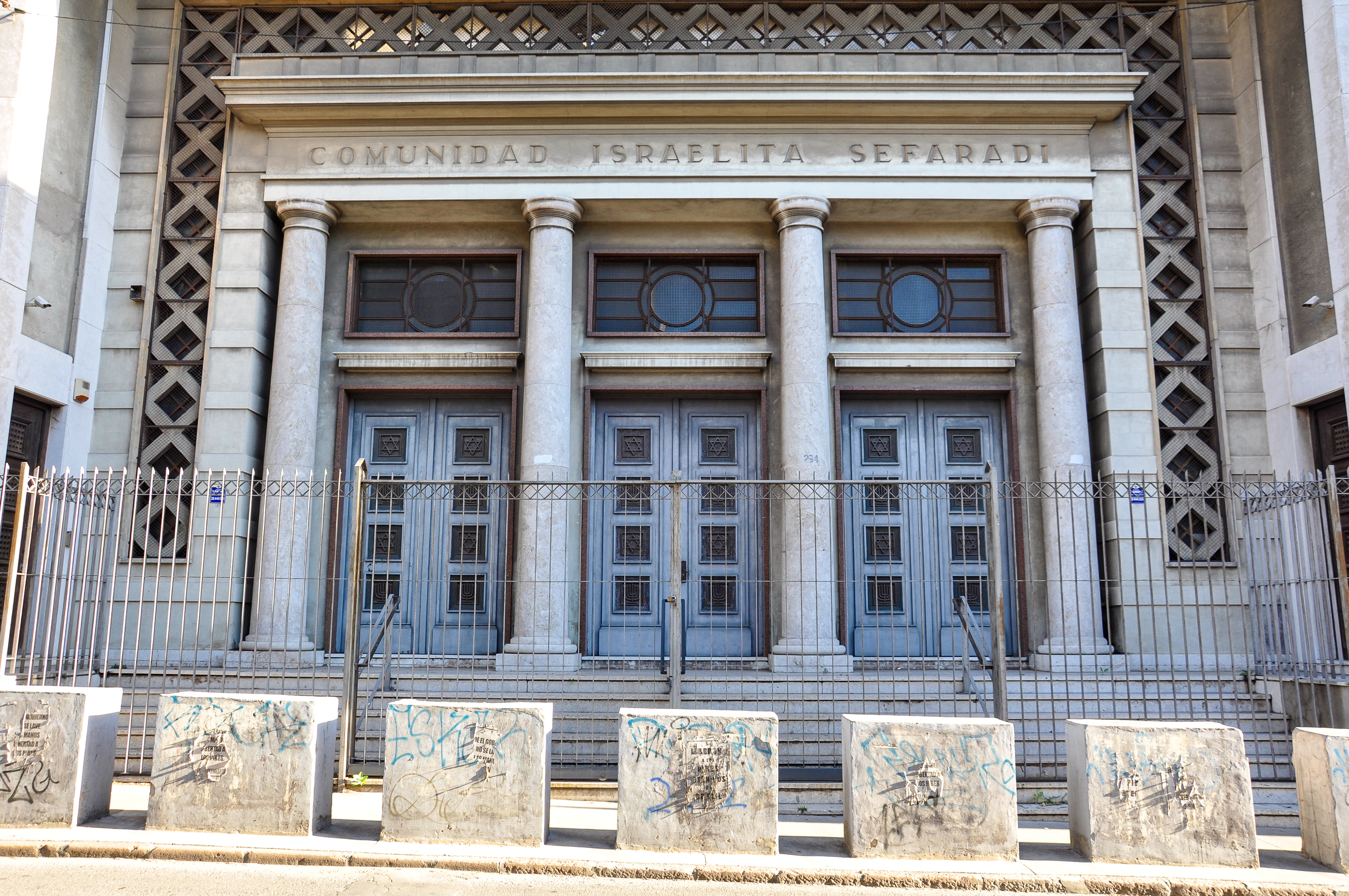
Synagogue of the Sephardic Jewish Community, Uruguay

Like the rest of Latin America, most residents of the Southern Cone are members of the Catholic Church, with a minority of Protestants, including a significant Lutheran population in South Brazil and South Chile. Other religions also present in the southern cone include Islam, Anglicanism, Eastern Orthodoxy, Buddhism, the Church of Jesus Christ of Latter-day Saints and Daoism. Jewish communities have thrived in cities of Argentina and Uruguay.

While the Southern Cone has been conservative in some aspects of religion, it has had a tradition of social reform and liberation theology has been followed by many in the Catholic Church. Uruguay, where agnosticism and atheism is common, has a policy of strong separation of church and state; it is one of the most secular countries in the Americas. Uruguay, Chile and Argentina, in that order, have the least religious residents in South America, according to their responses about the significance of religion in their lives. According to the Pew Research Center, 28% of Uruguayans, 43% of Argentines, and 41% of Chileans think of religion 'very important in their lives,' contrasting with the higher values given by the residents of countries such as Peru (72%), Colombia (77%) and Ecuador (76%).

The Southern Cone produced the first pope from the Western Hemisphere, Pope Francis, elected in 2013, born in Buenos Aires, Argentina.

Religion in the Southern Cone
Area	Catholic (%)	Protestant (%)	Irreligious (%)	Others	Unspecified (%)	Source
Argentina	62.9	15.3	18.9	2.6	0.3	
Chile	42.0	14.0	37.0	6.0	0.0	
Paraguay	88.3	6.8	2.6	1.7	0.8	
Uruguay	42.0	15.0	37.0	6.0	0.0	
(Paraná (state)) Paraná, Brazil	69.6	22.2	4.6	3.6	0.0	
Rio Grande do Sul, Brazil	68.8	18.3	5.3	5.2	0.0	
(Santa Catarina (state)) Santa Catarina, Brazil	73.1	20.4	3.2	3.3	0.0	
(São Paulo (state)) São Paulo, Brazil	60.1	24.1	8.1	7.7	0.0	

=== Other Cultural ===
In a 2014 social survey, residents rated their countries as 'good places for gay or lesbian people to live'; the following percentages said 'yes' in Uruguay (71%), Argentina (68%), and Chile (52%).

== Language ==
The overwhelming majority, including those of recent immigrant background, speak Spanish (in Argentina, Chile, Paraguay, and Uruguay) or Portuguese in the case of Southern Brazil. The Spanish-speaking countries of the Southern Cone are divided into two main dialects:

- Castellano Rioplatense (River Plate Spanish), spoken in Argentina and Uruguay, where the accent and daily language is heavily influenced by 19th-20th century Italian immigrants, has a particular intonation famously recognized by Spanish speakers from around the world. It is sometimes unofficially referred to as "Castellano Argentino/Argentine Spanish" due to the majority of the speakers (by population) being Argentines. Preliminary research has shown that Rioplatense Spanish has intonation patterns that resemble those of Italian dialects in the Naples region, differing markedly from those of other forms of Spanish. Buenos Aires, Rosario, and Montevideo had a massive influx of Italian immigrant settlers from the mid-19th until mid-20th centuries. Researchers note that the development of this dialect is a relatively recent phenomenon, developing at the beginning of the 20th century with the main wave of Italian immigration.
- Castellano Chileno (Chilean Spanish), spoken in Chile, features multiple accents, but one of its most common characteristics is the omission of the letter "s" when pronouncing words. For example, "Los chilenos" is pronounced as "Lo' chileno'." Additionally, in informal and colloquial speech (especially among close friends), the use of reverential voseo is common. This phenomenon changes phrases like "¿Dónde estás?" ("Where are you?") into "¿Dónde estáis?". However, since Chileans often omit the final "s," the resulting pronunciation is "¿Dónde estai?"

These dialects share common traits, such as a number of Lunfardo and Quechua words.

Minor languages and dialects include Cordobés, Cuyo, and Portuñol, a hybrid between Rioplatense and Brazilian Portuguese that is spoken in Uruguay on the border with Brazil.

=== Native American languages ===
Some Native American groups, especially in rural areas, continue to speak autochthonous languages, including Mapudungun (also known as Mapuche), Quechua, Aymara, and Guarani. The first is primarily spoken in Araucanía and adjacent areas of Patagonia, in southern Argentina and Chile. Guarani is the official language of Paraguay, the most widely spoken language in that country, and in 2010, the city of Tacuru, in the Brazilian state of Mato Grosso do Sul, adopted Guarani as the official language, besides Portuguese. It is also a co-official language in the northeastern Argentine provinces of Corrientes and Misiones.

=== Non-Iberian languages ===
Italian (mostly its Northern dialects, such as Venetian) is spoken in rural communities across Argentina, Southern Brazil, and São Paulo where immigrants had settled.

German, in various dialects, is mostly spoken in Southern Chile and Southern Brazil. As well as in the Chaco (Paraguay) by Mennonites. It is the second most spoken mother tongue in Brazil.

The Southern Cone is also known to have high English proficiency compared to other South American countries. This language is spoken in the Falkland Islands, a British Overseas Territory (disputed by Argentina).

Polish, Dutch and Ukrainian are also spoken in Southern Brazil. Dutch is spoken in Chile as well, and Ukrainian is used in Argentina as well. Croatian and other Slavic languages are also spoken in the southernmost areas of Chilean Patagonia, reflecting patterns of immigration and settlement. Yiddish can be heard mainly in Buenos Aires, Argentina and São Paulo, Brazil. In Brazil, Japanese is spoken by immigrant communities in the states of São Paulo and Paraná. By descendants in Argentina and Chile, Welsh is spoken by descendants of immigrants in the Patagonia region.

=== Comparison of selected words ===
Below are selected words to show vocabulary in the dialects of the countries of the Southern Cone and other Spanish-speaking countries in South America and the dialect of Portuguese spoken in Brazil.

	Chile	Argentina	Uruguay	Paraguay	Brazil	Bolivia	Colombia	Ecuador	Peru	Venezuela
apartment	departamento	departamento	apartamento	departamento	apartamento	departamento	apartamento	departamento	departamento	apartamento
artichoke	alcachofa	alcaucil	alcaucil	alcachofa	alcachofra	alcachofa	alcachofa	alcachofa	alcachofa	alcachofa
avocado	palta	palta	palta	aguacate	abacate	palta	aguacate	aguacate	palta	aguacate
banana	plátano	banana	banana	banana	banana	plátano	banano	banano	plátano	cambur
bean	poroto	poroto	poroto	poroto	feijão	frijol	fríjol	frejol	frijol	caraota
bell pepper	pimentón	morrón	morrón	locote	pimentão	pimiento	pimentón	pimiento	pimiento	pimientón
butter	mantequilla	manteca	manteca	manteca	manteiga	mantequilla	mantequilla	mantequilla	mantequilla	mantequilla
car	auto	auto	auto	auto	carro	auto	carro	auto	auto, carro	carro
corn on the cob	choclo	choclo	choclo	choclo	espiga de milho	choclo	mazorca	choclo	choclo	jojoto
drinking straw	bombilla	pajita	pajita	pajita	canudo	bombilla	pitillo	sorbete	sorbete	pitillo
earring	aro	aro	caravana	aro	brinco	arete	arete	arete	arete	zarcillo
grapefruit	pomelo	pomelo	pomelo	pomelo	toranja	pomelo	toronja	toronja	toronja	toronja
green bean	poroto verde	chaucha	chaucha	chaucha	vagem	vainita	habichuela	vainita	vainita	vainita
jacket	chaqueta	campera	campera	campera	jaqueta	chamarra	chaqueta	chompa	casaca, chompa	chaqueta
kitchen stove	cocina	cocina	cocina	cocina	fogão	cocina	estufa	cocina	cocina	estufa
papaya	papaya	papaya	papaya	mamón	mamão	papaya	papaya	papaya	papaya	lechosa
pea	arveja	arveja	arveja	arveja	ervilha	arveja	arveja	arveja	arveja	guisante
peanut	maní	maní	maní	maní	amendoim	maní	maní	maní	maní	maní
popcorn	cabritas	pochoclo	pop/pororó	pororó	pipoca	pipocas	crispetas/ maíz pira	canguil	canchita	cotufas
sneakers	zapatillas	zapatillas	championes	championes	tênis	tenis	tenis	zapatillas	zapatillas	gomas
socks	calcetines	medias	medias	medias	meias	medias	medias	medias	medias	medias
sweet potato	camote	batata	boniato	batata	batata doce	camote	batata	camote	camote	batata
swimming pool	piscina	pileta	piscina	pileta	piscina	piscina	piscina	piscina	piscina	piscina
t-shirt	polera	remera	remera	remera	camiseta	polera	camiseta	camiseta	polo	franela
washing machine	lavadora	lavarropas	lavarropas	lavarropas	máquina de lavar roupa	lavadora	lavadora	lavadora	lavadora	lavadora

== Demography ==
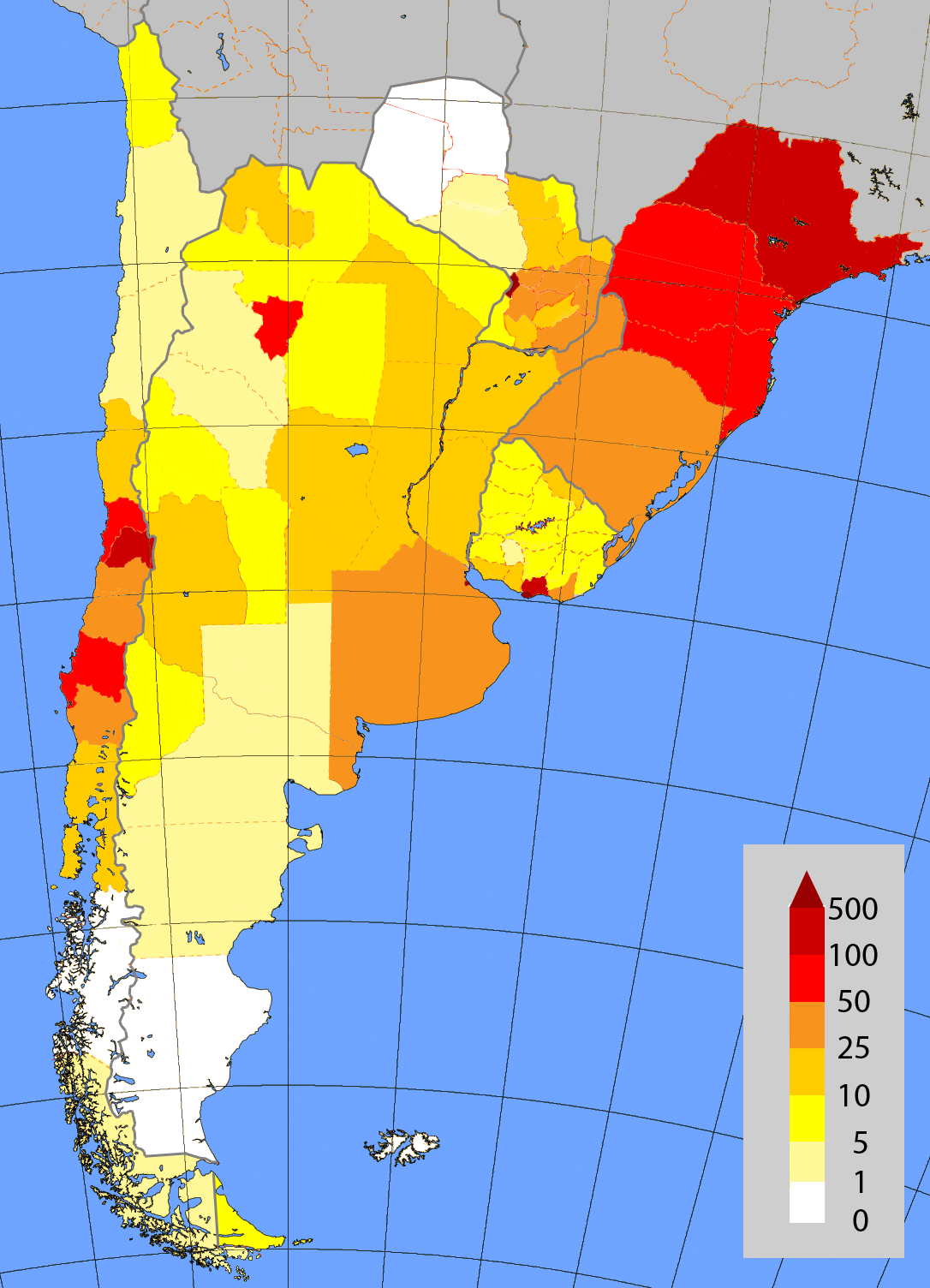
The population density of the Southern Cone by first-level national administrative divisions, 2007. Population/km^{2}

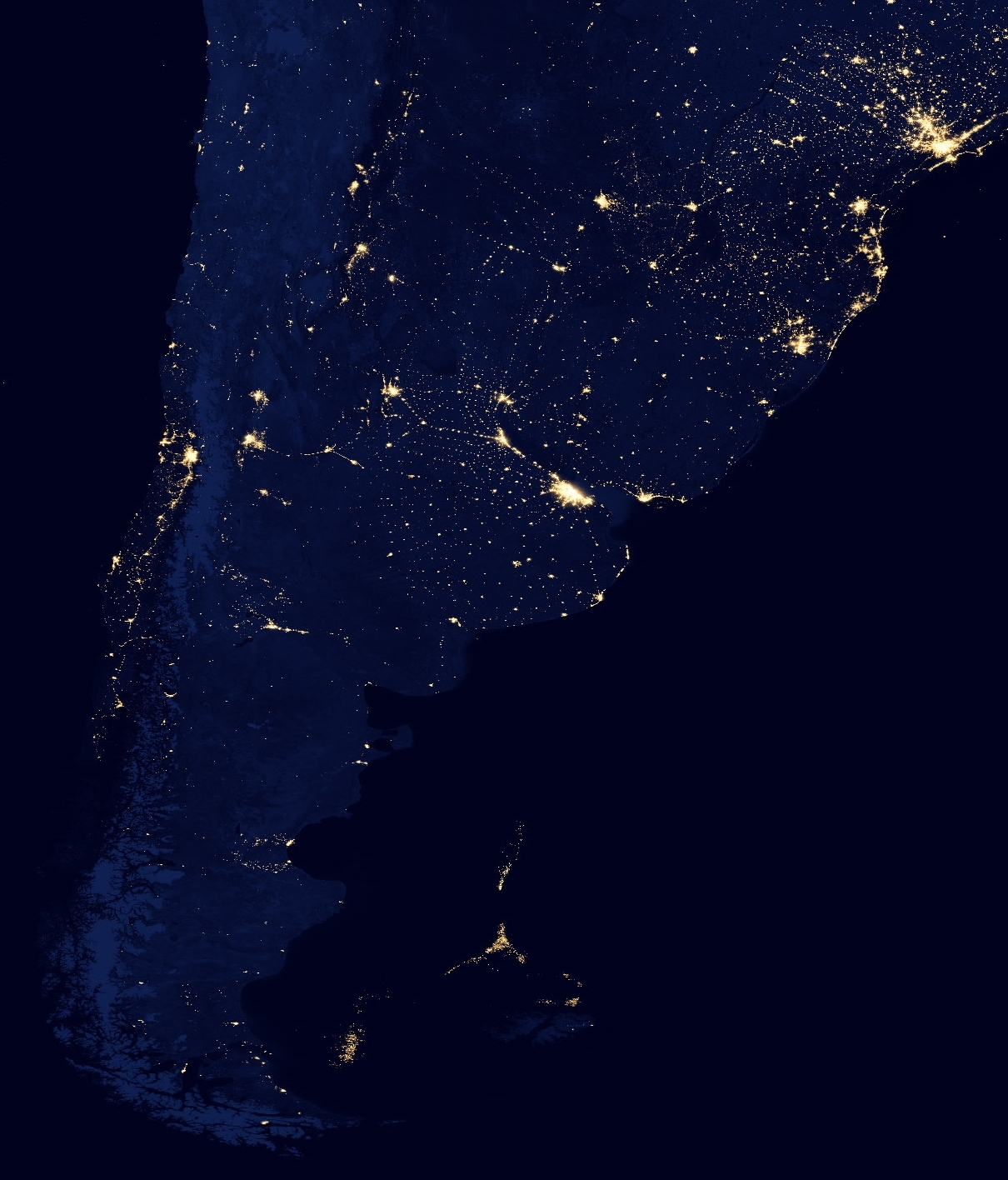
The Southern Cone at night, with light from cities.

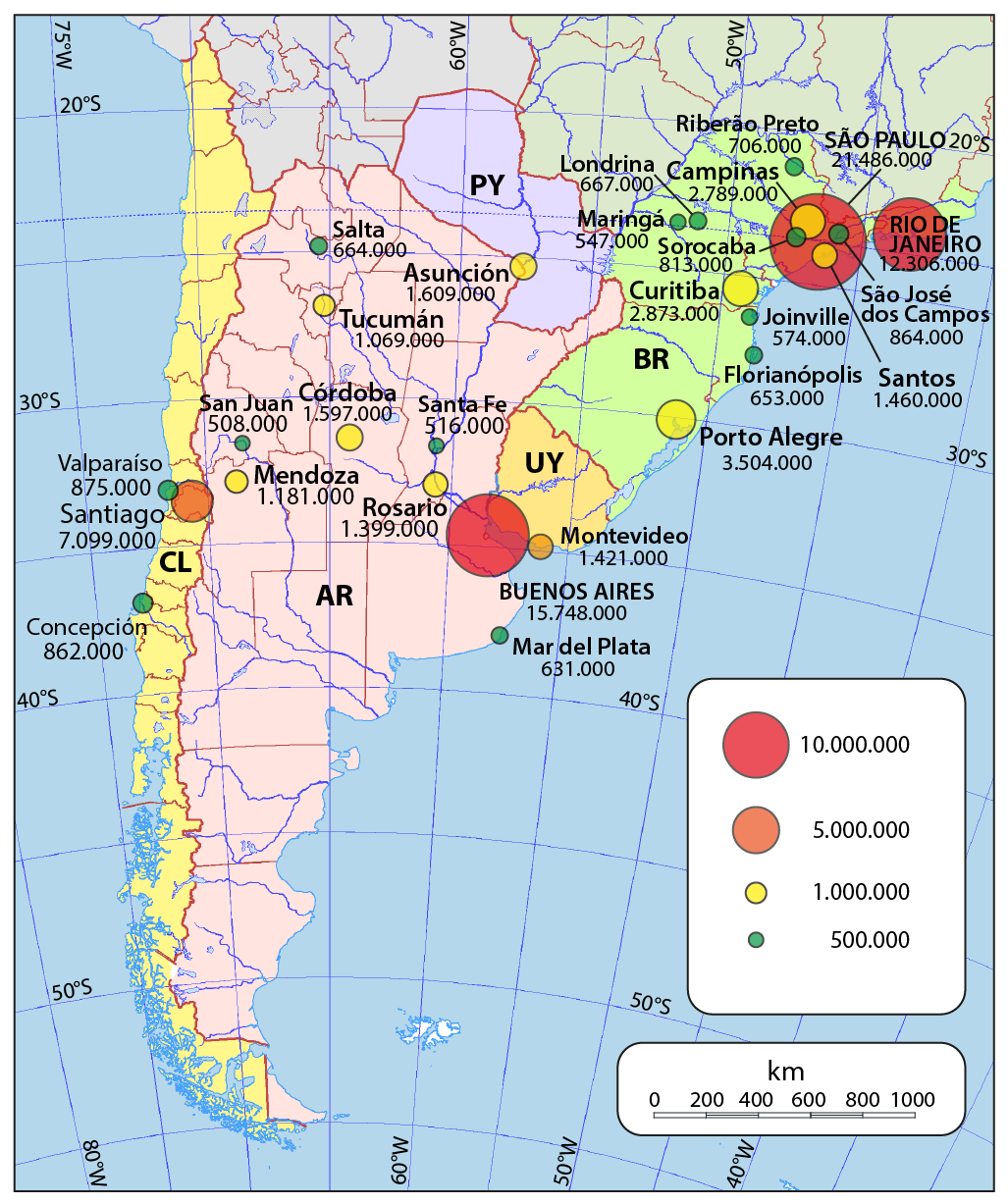
Major agglomerations of the Southern Cone, 2024

The population of Argentina, Chile and Uruguay is 40, 16.8 and 3.6 million respectively. Buenos Aires is the largest metropolitan area at 13.1 million and Santiago, Chile has 6.4 million. Uruguay's capital and largest city, Montevideo, has 1.8 million, and it receives many visitors on ferry boats across the Río de la Plata from Buenos Aires, 200 km (120 mi) away.

By contrast, the Patagonia region of southern Chile and Argentina is very sparsely populated, with a population density of less than two people per square kilometer.

=== Ethnicity ===
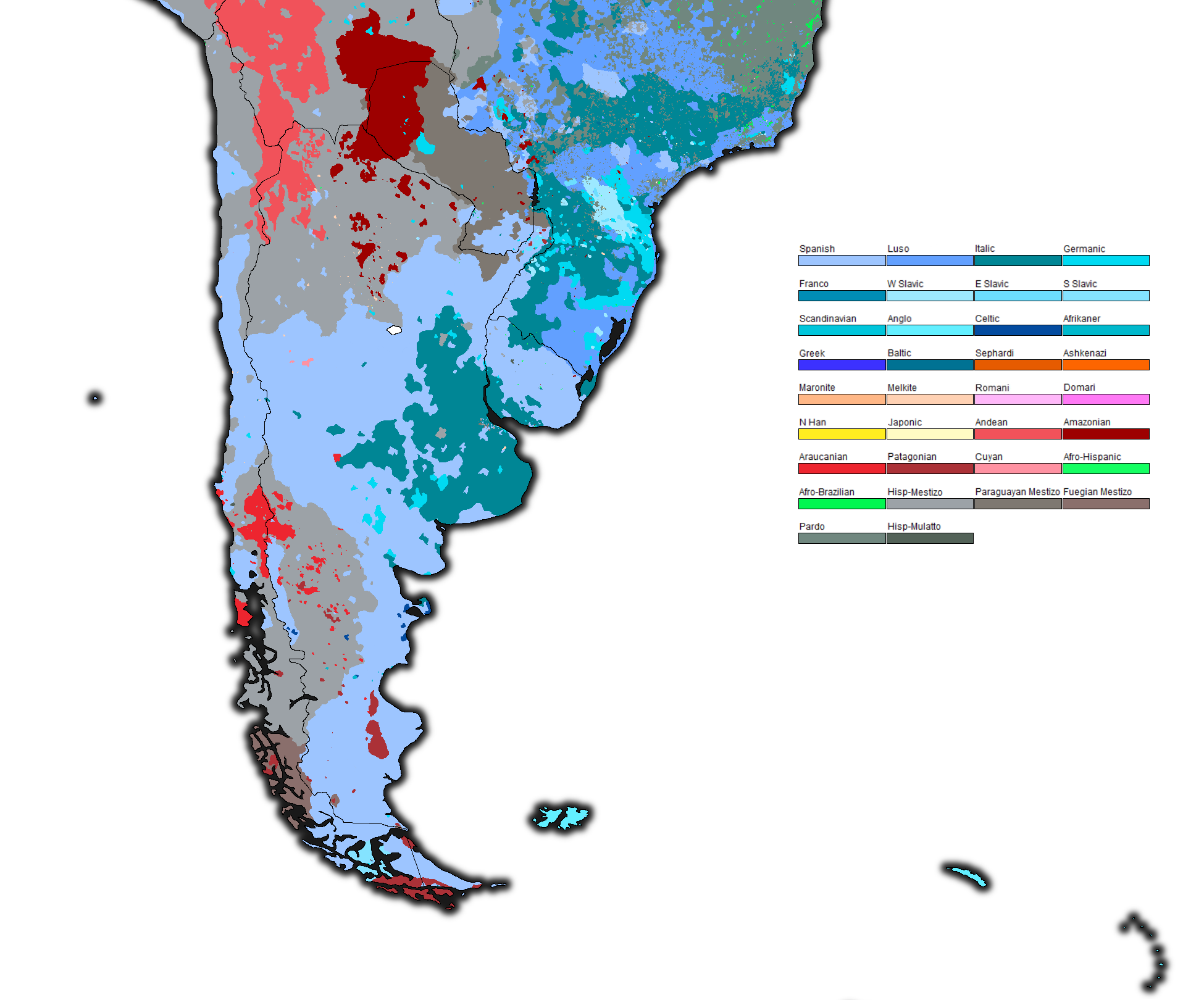
An ethnoracial map of the Southern Cone and surroundings, 2025

The population of the Southern Cone has been strongly influenced by waves of immigration from Europe in the late nineteenth and early twentieth centuries. People of direct European descent, make up 88% of total population of Uruguay, 85% of the total population of Argentina and 65% of the total population of Chile. The remainder of the population in these countries consists predominantly of mestizos with a significant proportion of European ancestry. In São Paulo, Paraná, Rio Grande do Sul, and Santa Catarina self-identified white people are 61.3%; 70.0%; 82.3%; and 86.8% of the population respectively, with people of Italian, Polish and German ancestry predominating.

Italians started to emigrate to the Southern Cone as early as the second half of the 17th century, and it became a mass phenomenon between 1880 and 1920 when Italy was facing social and economic disturbances. As a consequence of mass Italian immigration, the Southern Cone has the largest Italian diaspora in the world, with people of Italian descent being the majority in many places, with the highest percentage being in Argentina (62.5% Italian), and in the southern Brazilian state of Santa Catarina (60% Italian).

Among Italians who immigrated to Brazil, 70% went to the State of São Paulo. In consequence, the State of São Paulo has more people with Italian ancestry than any region of Italy itself, with São Paulo city being the most populous city with Italian ancestry in the world, of the 10 million inhabitants of São Paulo city, 60% (6 million people) have full or partial Italian ancestry (the largest city of Italy is Rome, with 2.5 million inhabitants). Small towns, such as Nova Veneza, have as much as 95% of their population of Italian descent.

The region also has a large German diaspora (second largest after the United States), with People of German descent being 25% of the population of Rio Grande do Sul and 35% of the population of Santa Catarina. Residents of German descent even predominate in South Chile due to German colonization of Valdivia, Osorno and Llanquihue.

Mestizos make up 15.8% of the population and are a majority in Paraguay. Native Americans make up 3% of the population, living in communities in Araucanía region in Chile. Mulattoes (people of European and African ancestry) mostly in Uruguay (0.2%), and Asians (1.0%), mostly in Argentina, the remaining 1.2%.

There is also a strong Arab presence in the Southern Cone, with people of full or at least partial Arab ancestry being 5% of the population of Uruguay and Chile, 9.8% of the population of Brazil, and 11% of the population of Argentina. Brazil has the largest number of Arabs outside the Middle East, with 20 million Brazilians being descendants of Arabs, while the Palestinian community in Chile is considered the largest outside the Arab world.

=== Genetic and historical roots ===
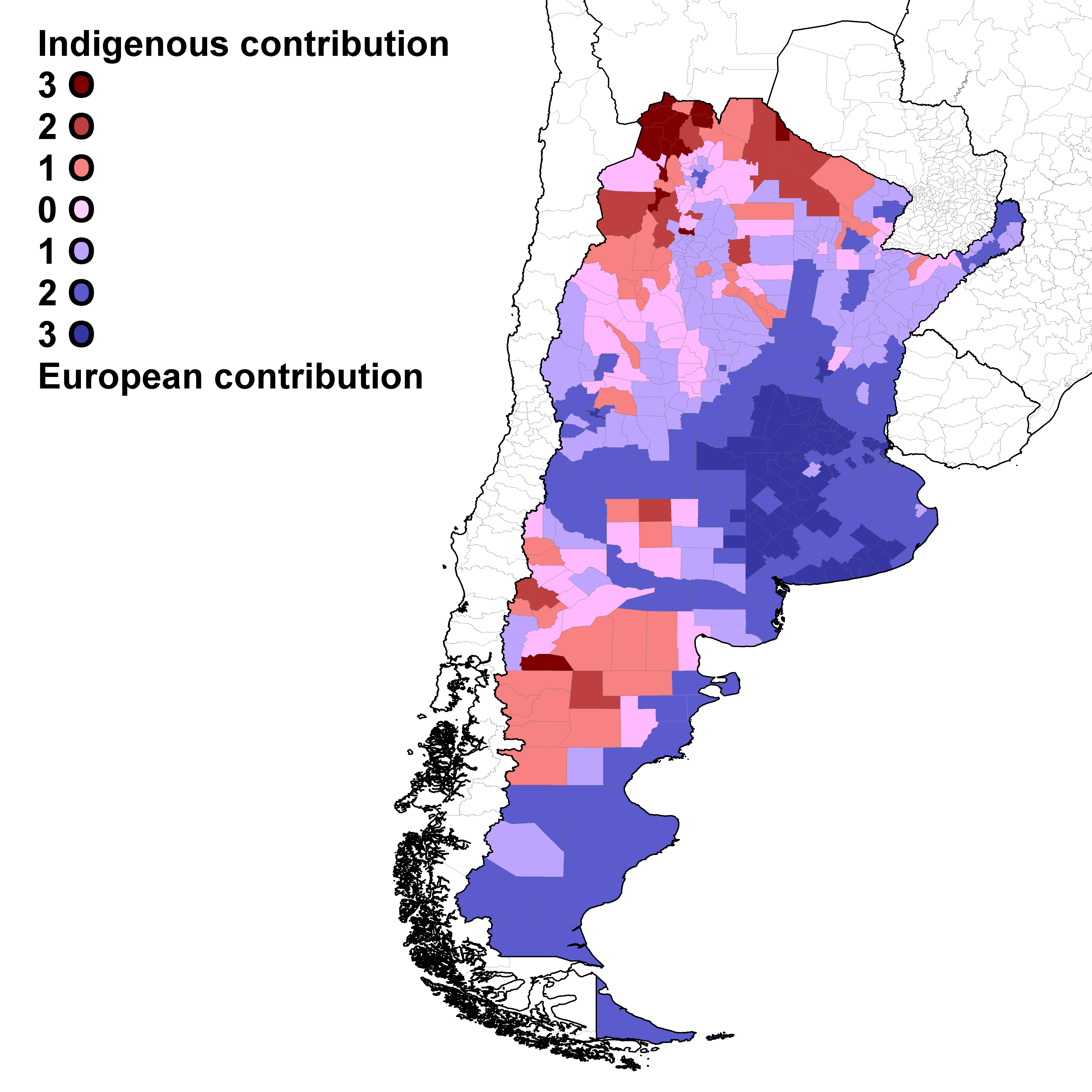
An ethnic map of Argentina and Uruguay, 2020

Since interethnic marriages are widespread in Latin America, complex ethnic classifications emerged, including more than a dozen of "racial" categories created in 18th century Hispanic America, with notorious examples being castizo, morisco and cambujo. In Brazil, about 190 "racial" categories were detected by the Census of 1976.

A study conducted on 218 individuals in 2010 by the Argentine geneticist Daniel Corach, has established that the genetic map of Argentina is composed of 79% different European ethnicities (mainly Spanish and Italian ethnicities), 18% of different indigenous ethnicities, and 4.3% of African ethnic groups, in which 63.6% of the tested group had at least one ancestor who was Indigenous. An autosomal DNA study from 2009 found the composition of the Argentine population to be 78.5% European, 17.3% Amerindian, and 4.2% Sub-Saharan African (SSA). Blacks made up 25% of the population of Buenos Aires in 1810, 1822 and 1838. In 1887, the government decided to cease asking Argentine citizens about their race. According to Laura López, it was a way to "hide" the Black population, not only from the Census, but also from public opinion.

Multiple studies concluded that Whites make 50-65% of the Chilean population and the CIA concluded that 89% are Whites, Castizos and Mestizos. The use of mitochondrial DNA and Y chromosome test results show the following: The European component is predominant (91.0%, versus 9.0% of the aboriginal one) in the Chilean upper class, the middle classes, 66.8%-62.3% European component and 37.7%-33.2 of mixed aboriginal and lower classes at 55–52.9% European component and 47.1%-45% mix of Aboriginal.

A DNA study from 2009, published in the American Journal of Human Biology, showed the genetical composition of Uruguay to be mainly European, but with Native American (which varies from 1% to 20% in different parts of the country) and also SSA (7% to 15% in different parts of the country).

Similar to the rest of Latin America, the genetic ancestry of the population of the Southern Cone reflects the history of the continent: the Iberian colonizers were mostly men who arrived without women. European immigration to this part of the world in the late 19th and early 20th centuries brought more European and Middle Eastern components to the local population.

== Education and standards of living ==
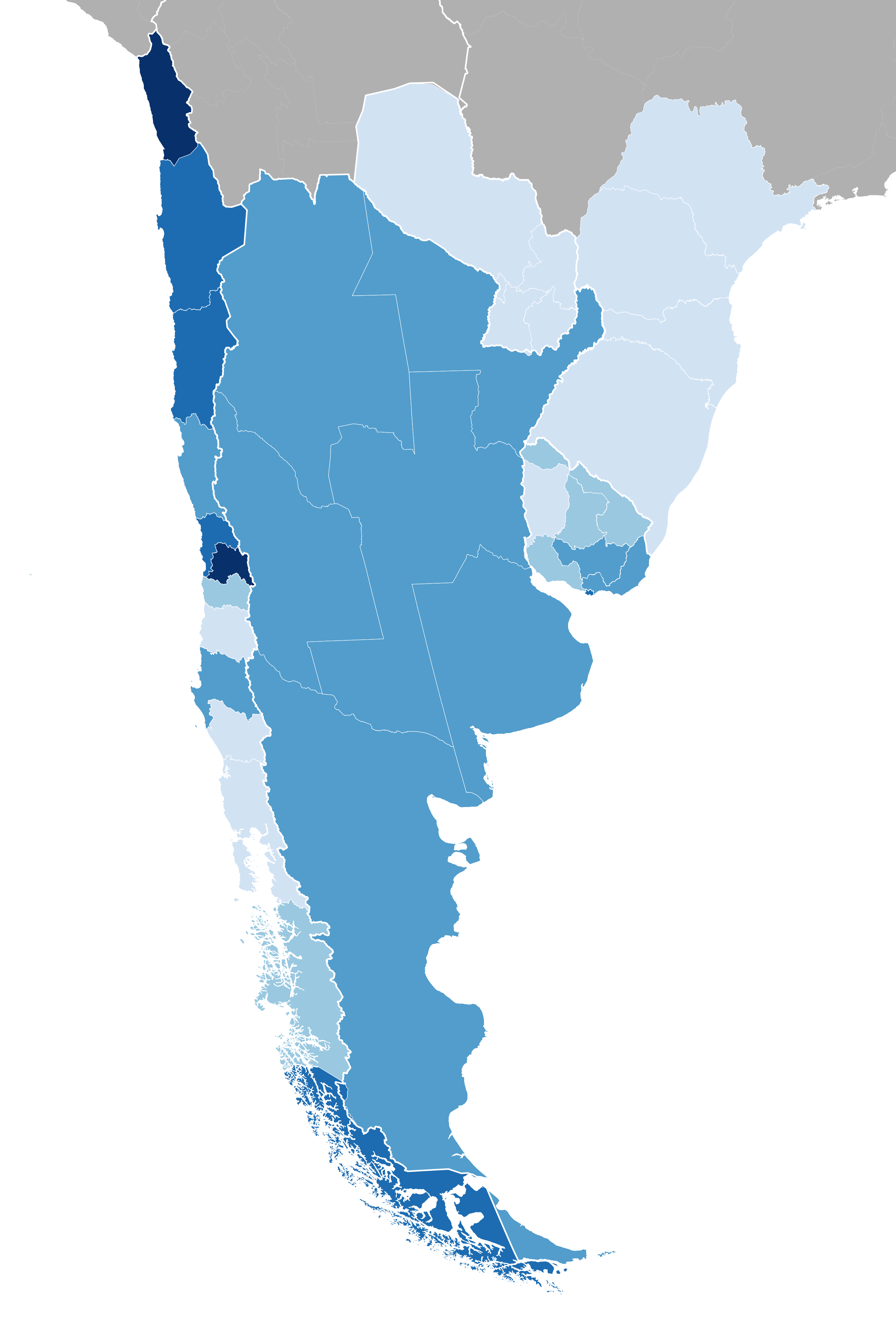
Southern Cone subnational entities by Human Development Index (2023) ≥ 0.900 0.875 – 0.900 0.825 – 0.875 0.825 – 0.825 < 0.825

The Southern Cone is the most prosperous region in Latin America. The region has relatively high standard of living and quality of life. Chile's, Argentina's, and Uruguay's HDIs — (0.862), (0.878) and (0.865) — are the highest in Latin America, similar to European countries like Croatia, Portugal, Slovakia, Hungary or Romania.

The region has a high life expectancy, and access to health care and education. In Uruguay, illiteracy technically does not exist.

From an economic point of view, the Southern Cone countries have been praised for being the most Libertarian and pro Free market in Latin America that gave them the profile of "emerging economies".

Crime rate is significantly lower in this region compared other countries in Latin America.

Since the return to democracy, Chile, Argentina, and Uruguay have experienced significant democratic stability. After enduring military dictatorships during the 1970s and 1980s, each country transitioned to democratic governance, leading to a more open and participatory political environment.

Summary of socio-economic performance indicators for Latin American countries
Country	GDP per capita (PPP) (2015 estimates) USD	Income equality (2015) Gini index	Human Develop. (2014 estimates) HDI	Environmental Perform. (2014) EPI	Failed States Index 2014	Lack of Corruption 2014	Economic Freedom 2015	Peace 2014	Democracy 2010
Brazil	15,518	52.7	0.759 (H)	52.9	64.8	43	56.6	2.073	7.12
Central America (Note: Excluding Belize.)	10,502	49.7	0.678 (M)	51.0	68.8	37	62.2	2.058	6.45
Mexico	18,714	48.1	0.774 (H)	55.0	71.1	35	66.4	2.500	6.91
South America (Note: Excluding the ABC countries, the Falkland Islands, The Guianas, and Uruguay.)	11,955	47.5	0.715 (H)	50.3	76.7	31	55.0	2.233	6.01
Southern Cone (Note: Excluding the Falkland Islands, Paraguay, São Paulo State, and South Brazil.)	22,493	45.2	0.820 (VH)	57.7	42.4	60	1.648	7.60	7.84

== Politics ==
During the second half of 20th century, these countries were in some periods ruled by right-wing juntas, military nationalistic dictatorships. Around the 1970s, these regimes collaborated as part of Operation Condor against leftist opposition, including urban guerrillas. However, by the early 1980s Argentina and Uruguay restored their democracies; Chile followed suit in 1990.

=== Latest presidential elections ===
==== Argentina (2023) ====
Candidate	Running mate	Party	Votes	%
Javier Milei	Victoria Villarruel	La Libertad Avanza (alliance)	14,554,560	55.65
Sergio Massa	Agustín Rossi	Union for the Homeland (alliance)	11,598,720	44.35
Total			26,153,280	100.00
Valid votes			26,153,280	96.79
Invalid votes			450,746	1.67
Blank votes			417,574	1.55
Total votes			27,021,600	100.00
Registered voters/turnout			35,405,398	76.32

==== Chile (2025) ====
Candidate	Party	Votes	%
José Antonio Kast	Change for Chile (alliance)	7,263,236	58.17
Jeannette Jara	Unidad por Chile (alliance)	5,222,558	41.83
Total		12,485,794	100.00
Valid votes		12,485,794	92.94
Invalid votes		783,816	5.83
Blank votes		165,344	1.23
Total votes		13,434,954	100.00
Registered voters/turnout		15,779,102	85.14

==== Uruguay (2024) ====
Candidate	Running mate	Party	Votes	%
Yamandú Orsi	Carolina Cosse	Broad Front (alliance)	1,212,833	52.00
Álvaro Delgado	Valeria Ripoll	Republican Coalition (alliance)	1,119,537	48.00
Total			2,332,370	100.00
Valid votes			2,332,370	95.72
Invalid votes			64,654	2.65
Blank votes			39,542	1.62
Total votes			2,436,566	100.00
Registered voters/turnout			2,727,120	89.35

=== Governments ===
Timeline of presidents

== See also ==
- Argentine irredentism
- Viceroyalty of the Río de la Plata
- Caribbean South America
- The Guianas
- Northern Mexico
- Northern Triangle of Central America
