= South American Railway Congress =

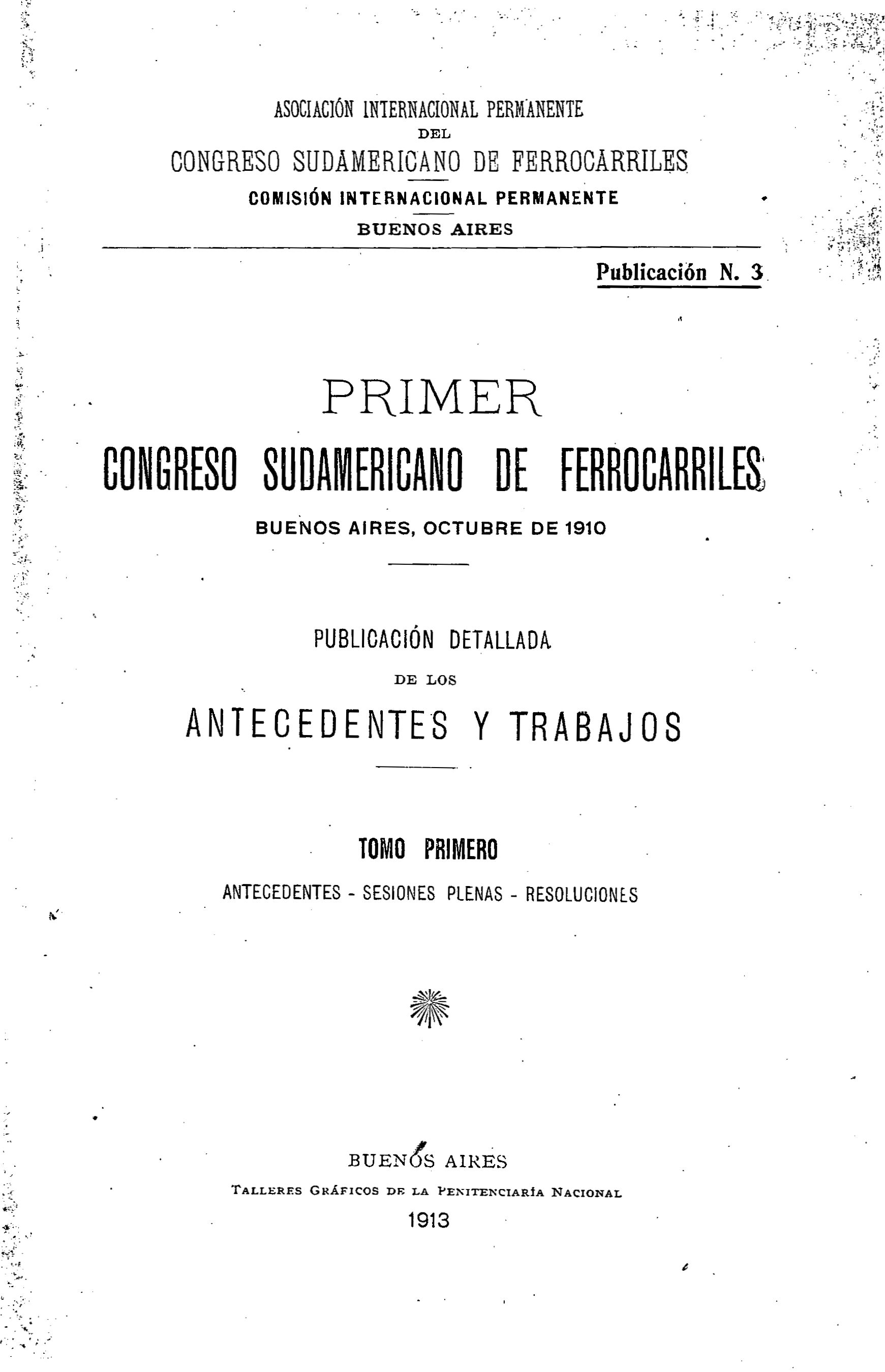
Proceedings of the First South American Railway Congress in Buenos Aires in 1910, published in 1913

Four South American Railway Congresses (Spanish: Congreso Sudamericano de Ferrocarriles, Congreso SudFerro; Portuguese: Congresso Ferroviário Sul-Americano) were held between 1910 and 1941:

- in Buenos Aires, Argentina in 1910;
- in Rio de Janeiro, Brazil in 1922;
- in Santiago de Chile in 1929; and
- in Bogotá, Colombia in 1941.

The first congress had been assembled on the initiative of the government of Argentina. The congresses primarily served as a meeting point for the Southern Cone countries to exchange ideas about railroad development and how to integrate the economies of different countries through railroad communications. At the Bogotá congress it was decided that the South American congresses would be substituted by Pan-American Railway Congresses. The fifth Pan-American Railway Congress was held in Montevideo in April 1946.
