= Abumohor =

Abumohor is a surname. Notable people with the surname include:

- Carlos Abumohor (1921–2010), Chilean businessman
- Ricardo Abumohor (born 1942), Chilean businessman
