= Chile–Lebanon relations =

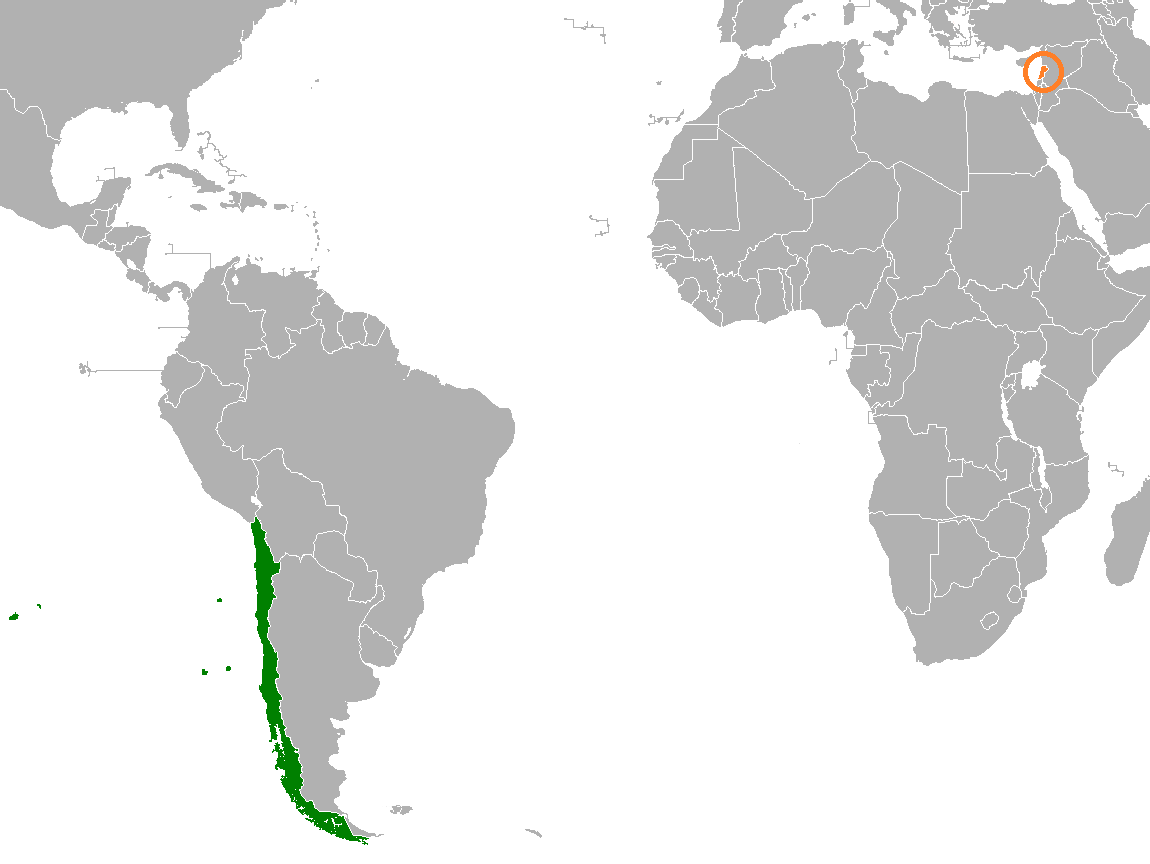
- Chile: Lebanon

Chile–Lebanon relations refers to the current and historical relations between Chile and Lebanon. Both nations are members of the Group of 77 and the United Nations.

== History ==
In the late 1800s, the first Lebanese migrants arrived in Chile and were referred to as "Turks" because Lebanon was part of the Ottoman Empire at the time. Initially, most Lebanese migrants to Chile were Christians, however, over the decades, Lebanese professing the Islamic faith also began immigrating to Chile. In 1943, Lebanon obtained its independence from France and in 1945, Chile and Lebanon established diplomatic relations.

Relations between Chile and Lebanon were limited during the Lebanese Civil War. In 1997, Chilean Deputy Foreign Minister, Mariano Fernández, paid a visit to Lebanon to strengthen bilateral, political and economic ties between both nations. In 1998, a Chilean economic delegation inaugurated a Middle East trade office in Beirut. The delegation was headed by the head of the Middle East and Africa Department at the Chilean Foreign Ministry. The delegation also included a group of Chilean businessmen who represented the various economic sectors in the country.

In December 2014, Lebanese Foreign Minister, Gebran Bassil, paid an official visit to Chile and met with Chilean Foreign Minister, Heraldo Muñoz. During the visit, both foreign ministers declared procedures had been launched to facilitate obtaining visas and to initiate direct flights between the two countries. Foreign Minister Bassil also met with members of Lebanese community in Chile and urged them to support Lebanon during its critical period.

In 2015, both nations celebrated 70 years of diplomatic relations. At the start of the Syrian civil war, Chile evacuated its diplomatic personnel and citizens from Syria to Lebanon. In 2017, Chile received 66 Syrian refugees from Lebanon to resettle in the South American nation.

== Bilateral agreements ==
Both nations have signed a few agreements such as a Treaty for Peace and Friendship (1950); Agreement on Cultural Cooperation (1955); Agreement for Economic and Trade Cooperation (1997) and an Agreement for the Promotion and Protection of Investments (1999).

== Trade ==
In 2018, trade between both nations totaled US$354 million. Chile's main exports to Lebanon include: walnuts; salmon; grapes, including raisins; other fruits; lupins; and leather products. Lebanon's main export products to Chile include: crude petroleum or bituminous mineral oils; gold; diamonds; motor vehicles; scrap metal; electric transformers; and phosphatic mineral or chemical fertilizers.

In June 2026, bilateral trade between Lebanon and Chile recorded a trade deficit of $1.56 million for Lebanon, with $1.56 million in imports from Chile and negligible recorded exports. Between June 2025 and June 2026, Lebanese exports to Chile remained stable, while imports from Chile increased by 16.8% ($225,000), up from $1.34 million.

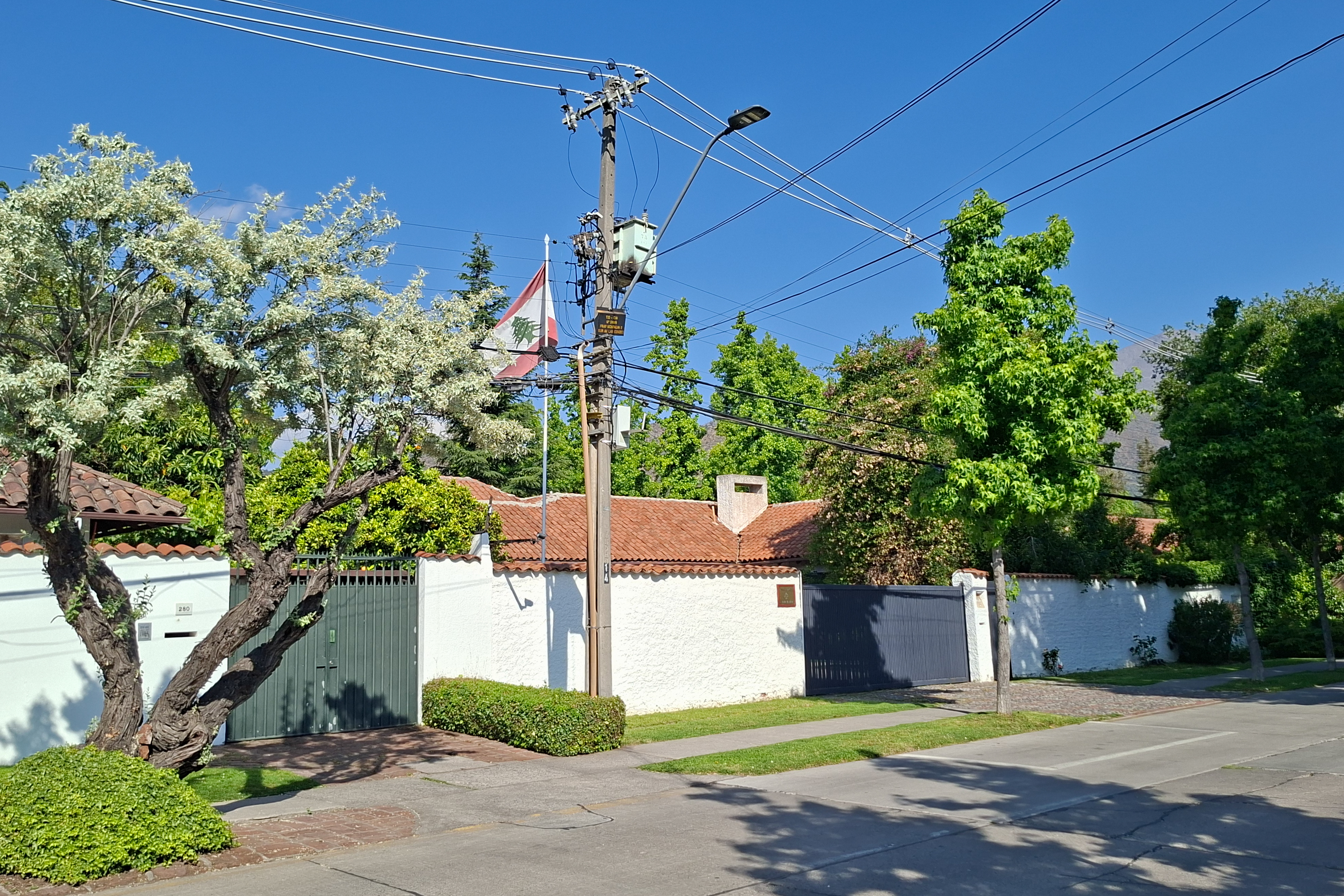
Embassy of Lebanon in Santiago

== Resident diplomatic missions ==
- Chile has an embassy in Beirut.
- Lebanon has an embassy in Santiago.

== See also ==
- Lebanese Chileans
