= Parque Arauco S.A. =

Chilean shopping malls company

- Company type: Sociedad Anónima
- Traded as: BCS: PARAUCO
- Industry: Shopping Malls
- Founded: 1979
- Headquarters: Santiago, Chile
- Key people: José Said, (CEO)
- Products: Management of Shopping Malls
- Revenue: ▲US$ 209.4 million (2012)
- Net income: ▲US$ 76.0 million (2012)
- Number of employees: 300
- Website: www.parquearauco.cl

Parque Arauco is the third largest Chilean shopping malls company, after Cencosud's malls division and Mall Plaza the S.A.C.I. Falabella shopping malls subsidiary. It is headquartered in Santiago. The company manages shopping malls in Chile, Peru and Colombia. It has 24 shopping malls with a total of GLA 672,700 square meters.

== Company history ==
The powerful Said clan in South America was founded by patriarch Isa Said, who immigrated to Peru from Jerusalem and made a fortune in commerce. His five sons contributed much towards the development of the textile industry in Peru and Bolivia, managing extensive cotton plantations and cotton-yarn factories. One of the five was Salvador, the father of nine children, including one son named José Said Saffie. José became involved in his extended family's operations at an early age. During the 1940s, the Said family relocated to Chile to develop a textile industry there, and José Said was an active participant in their first business, Industrias Químicas Generales. In the 1960s, José Said and his uncle founded Banco del Trabajo, which grew to be among the five largest banks in Chile.

=== Chilean projects during the 1980s ===
In 1979, José Said founded Parque Arauco S.A. (PASA), a real estate development firm that was incorporated in 1981. The following year, he and his associates, who included Tomás Fürst Freiwirth and the Martínez Perales brothers, opened the Parque Arauco Shopping Center in the Las Condes municipality of Santiago, which contained retail stores Gala-Sears and Muricy (later owned by Falabella and Almacenes París, respectively). Since the mall adjoins at Kennedy Avenue (Avenida Kennedy), it is often referred to as Parque Arauco Kennedy to distinguish it from the corporation. Aided by an overvalued Chilean peso and an economic free trade policy, Chile was saturated with inexpensive foreign products when Parque Arauco Kennedy was inaugurated, and those who could afford to buy filled the new mall. However, the Chilean economy was falling into deep recession. Around the same time, the company introduced Arauco Outlet Mall in Santiago's Maipú municipality. This commercial center did not perform well and was later converted into a shopping mall.

=== 1990s ===
In 1997, PASA's partners decided to divide their Chilean holdings. The Said group acquired Fürst's 12% holding and turned over to Fürst its 14% share of Plaza Vespucio, which became the core property of Fürst's rival venture, Grupo Plaza (or Mall Plaza). The Said group now controlled 38% of PASA's outstanding shares. The Abumohor family, also active in textiles and, like the Saids, of Arab origin, held 10%. Two pension funds held a combined 24%. Parque Arauco Kennedy was Chile's largest shopping mall at the time, with annual sales of $500 million, while Plaza Vespucio ranked third, at $380 million. A medical tower was being constructed at Parque Arauco Kennedy, and an office building was being contemplated at a cost of $100 million. For Mall Arauco Maipú, PASA was considering building an additional medical tower and a high-rise apartment building. In 1999, PASA, in partnership with the Almacenes Paris and Ripley retail chain, completed the Marina Arauco Mall in Viña del Mar at a cost of $120 million. PASA malls accounted for 24% of Chile's shopping-center revenues in that year.

== Entry into Argentina ==
PASA entered Argentina in the early 1990s, when the nation was emerging from a decade of economic crisis. In 1992, the company acquired a 25% share of the Centro Comercial Mendoza Plaza Shopping and later became a major investor in Argentine real estate in association with Inversiones y Representaciones S.A. (IRSA). In 1994, IRSA and PASA became partners in Sociedad Anónimo del Mercado de Abasto Provedor (Samap), a joint venture to convert the former produce market in Buenos Aires to a shopping mall. PASA donated its share of the Mendoza shopping center to Samap, while IRSA turned over its holding in Nuevo Noa Shopping, located in Salta City. In 1997, after Samap was renamed Alto Palermo S.A. (APSA), IRSA controlled 51%, while Parque Arauco controlled 35%.

In 1997, Samap acquired Alto Palermo S.A. from the Pérez Company S.A. holding company. APSA held three Buenos Aires shopping centers: Alto Palermo, Alto Avellaneda, and Paseo Alcorta, plus 50.5% of a fourth, Buenos Aires Design. Abasto Shopping Center was completed in 1998 at a cost of about $112 million. Located in Balvanera, a formerly Jewish barrio that was also the stamping grounds of Carlos Gardel, Argentina's well-known tango dancer and singer, it occupied five levels, with 189 stores, a food court, a multiplex cinema, entertainment facilities, and a children's museum.

=== Argentine recession ===
The 1998–2002 Argentine great depression culminated in the government defaulting on its debt and the devaluation of the Argentine peso at the end of 2001. APSA's market value declined from $390 million to as low as $40 million. The damage to PASA's finances inspired a shakeup of the company's management. In an interview with the new general manager, Andrés Olivos, for the Chilean magazine La Capital in 2003, reporter Lorena Medel contended that "it was rumored that Parque Arauco had had a grade-10 earthquake. That its finances were delicate, and that shareholders couldn't believe the level of debt that was permitted to arise with respect to Arauco Salud" (the medical tower). Olivos denied the situation was ever as dire as some suspected and revealed that the company was opening a "gastronomical boulevard" for Parque Arauco Kennedy. He conceded that Arauco Maipú had failed as an outlet store center and had returned to its role as a traditional mall.

Olivos acknowledged that PASA had fallen behind Grupo Plaza and Cencosud S.A. in commercial real estate development in Chile. "Our strategy", he maintained, "is distinct, and we believe that to enter this headlong race by adding square meters doesn't necessarily add value. A good part of this growth only generates cannibalization, and many of the new investments won't pay off in any foreseeable amount of time." Olivos said that PASA maintained a 32% market share in Santiago, with annual sales of roughly $200 million, and 20 million annual customers for Arauco Kennedy, 15 million for Arauco Maipú, and 17 million for Marina Arauco. He added that the company had 45% of the mall market in Buenos Aires. Olivos revealed that PASA signed a contract with Arauco Salud's new owners that would permit it to recover the $2.5 million debt incurred while constructing the 13-story tower. The company was also contemplating construction of a dental-office building in Arauco Kennedy. In addition, PASA completed its gastronomical boulevard during late 2003.

=== After the revival of the Argentine economy ===
With the revival of the Argentine economy well underway, PASA was planning new shopping malls in Rosario, Neuquén, and Caballito, the latter two in collaboration with IRSA by means of APSA. Alto Rosario Shopping, completed in late 2004 in partnership with Coto Centro Integral de Comercialización S.A., was a conversion of an old railroad station within the original structure. APSA also had plans to enter Córdoba by purchasing land or acquiring one of three existing shopping centers. Sales from PASA properties were expected to reach $1.1 billion in 2004, with Argentina providing 38% of the total. All of APSA's properties were at least 96% leased. PASA's debt in Argentina was reduced from over $200 million in 2002 to about $28 million in 2003.

== Developments since 2005 ==
In a 2005 article, La Capital proclaimed that PASA had "woken up", with its three Chilean malls fully occupied, the success of Boulevard Gastronómico, a strong financial structure, many new projects for the next two years, and intentions to enter the retail market. The company was planning to construct 40 new Boulevard sites, a $20 million office real-estate project, remodel Arauco Maipú, build, in alliance with the Almacenes Paris and Ripley, a new commercial center in Curicó, and possibly financing retail businesses. He told the magazine, however, that the shopping mall market was saturated in Santiago and that PASA was not interested in entering "the war for square meters." Indeed, he voiced his belief that only three or four malls in Chile generated enough business to justify the level of investment that had been made in them. In Argentina, besides participating in the construction of Alto Rosario, PASA was preparing to increase its stake in APSA from 27% to 32% with the impending conversion of $200 million in convertible bonds to common stock. In 2004, PASA reported net profits of CLP 7.56 billion on revenues of CLP 24.89 billion. The company's long-term debt was CLP 101.92 billion at the end of 2004.
