= Lebanese Chileans =

Total population
- 27,000 descendants

Regions with significant populations
- Valparaíso, La Serena, Santiago

Languages
- Chilean Spanish, Lebanese Arabic

Religion
- Majority: Eastern Orthodoxy, Roman Catholicism; Minority: Judaism, Islam

Related ethnic groups
- Arab Chileans, Chilean Jews

Lebanese Chileans, are immigrants to Chile from Lebanon. Most are Christian and they arrived in Chile in the mid-19th to early-20th centuries to escape from poverty. Ethnically Lebanese Chileans are often called "Turks" (Spanish: Turcos), a term believed to derive from the fact that they arrived from present day Lebanon, which at that time was occupied by the Ottoman Turkish Empire. Most arrived as members of the Eastern Orthodox church and the Maronite church, but became Roman Catholic. Lebanese Jews from Beirut immigrated to Chile in the late 19th century. A minority of Lebanese Muslims are also present in the country.

== See also ==
- Chile–Lebanon relations
- Immigration to Chile
- Lebanese diaspora
- List of Lebanese people in Chile
