= José Said =

Chilean businessman (1930–2020)

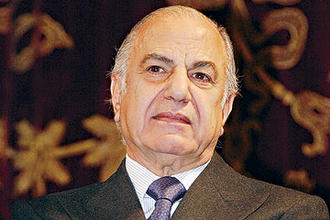
- Born: 17 April 1930; Arequipa, Peru
- Died: 23 July 2020 (aged 90); Santiago, Chile
- Education: University of Chile
- Occupations: Business lawyer
- Organization: Grupo Said

José Said Saffie (17 April 1930 – 23 July 2020) was a Peruvian-born Chilean businessman of Palestinian ancestry and the founder and head of Parque Arauco S.A., one of the largest real estate developers and operators of shopping malls in both Chile and Argentina.
