= Roberto Bishara =

Chilean-Palestinian football defender

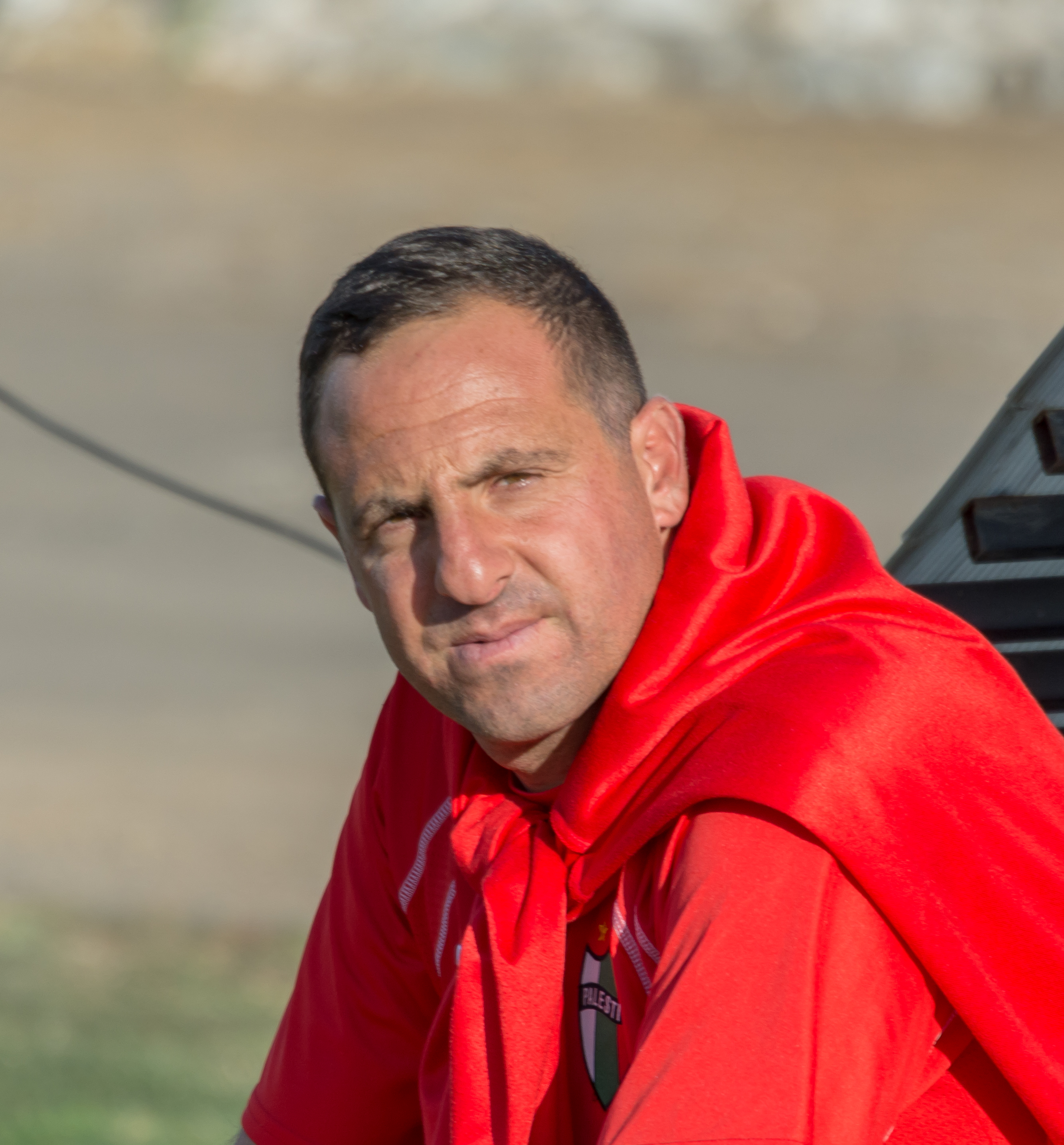
- Bishara in 2019

Personal information
- Full name: Roberto Fabián Bishara Adauy
- Date of birth: 18 August 1981 (age 45)
- Place of birth: Las Condes, Chile
- Height: 6 ft 2 in (1.88 m)
- Position: Defender

Team information
- Current team: Deportes Recoleta (assistant)

Youth career
- 1996–1997: Universidad Católica

Senior career*
Years	Team	Apps	(Gls)
1997–1999	Universidad Católica	0	(0)
2001–2004	Palestino	97	(3)
2004	Santiago Wanderers	14	(0)
2005–2013	Palestino	168	(8)
Total		279	(11)

International career
2004	Palestine U23	2	(0)
2002–2011	Palestine	27	(0)

Managerial career
- 2015: Palestino (youth)
- 2016–2017: Palestino (assistant)
- 2017–2023: Palestino (youth)
- 2023: Balong FC (seven-a-side)
- 2026–: Deportes Recoleta (assistant)
- * Club domestic league appearances and goals

Roberto Fabián Bishara Adauy (born 18 August 1981) is a former footballer who played as a defender. Born in Chile, he played for the Palestine national team.

== Early life ==
He was born on 18 August 1981, in Las Condes, Chile.

== Club career ==
Bishara is a product of Universidad Católica.

== International career ==
Roberto and his brother Fabián, represented the Palestine national under-23 team at the 2004 Summer Olympics Qualifiers.

== Managerial career ==
He began his managerial career at the Palestino youth ranks. Next, he worked as the assistant coach of both Nicolás Córdova and Omar Toloza. He returned to the youth categories, getting the 2022 Chilean Youth Championship at under-17 level.

At the end of 2023, Bishara served as coach for Balong FC in the Legends Cup, a Chilean championship similar to Kings League.

== Personal life ==
Bishara is a Palestinian Christian (Roman Catholic). Both his father and his grandfather were born in Palestine.

== Career statistics ==
=== International ===
Appearances and goals by national team and year
National team	Year	Apps	Goals
Palestine	2002	2	0
Palestine	2003	6	0
Palestine	2004	6	0
Palestine	2005	–	
Palestine	2006	7	0
Palestine	2007	1	0
Palestine	2008	1	0
Palestine	2009	2	0
Palestine	2010	–	
Palestine	2011	2	0
Total		27	0

== Honours ==
=== Player ===
Palestino

- Primera División de Chile runner-up: 2008 Clausura

=== Manager ===
Palestino U17

- Chilean Youth Championship: 2022
