= Carlos Abumohor =

Chilean businessman

Carlos Abumohor Touma (1921–2010) was a successful Chilean of Palestinian descent, businessman and investor who was involved in a number of financial activities in the development of the Chilean banking, media and real estate sectors.

Abumohor owned a controlling interest in Chile's second largest media conglomerate, Consorcio Periodístico de Chile S.A. (Copesa). He had been the chairman of the board of directors for one of Chile's largest private banking institutions, Corpbanca S.A., since June 18, 1996. He was chairman for Banco Osorno as well as several other major Chilean companies.

Shortly after, in 1997, came the purchase and management of Banco Concepción, today Corpbanca, which was bought by the New Zealand company Manuka, for which they paid 80 million dollars. In 2009, he assumed the position of honorary president.

Apart from that, Carlos Abumohor shared some of his businesses with his brothers Nicolás with the holding San Nicolás y René (with stakes in Parque Arauco and Corp Group) but also made moves of his own. In 1999, the family split the businesses and Carlos was left with Hilanderías Maisa and Industrias Saionara. He also had a business venture in the fishing business with the company Chilesan, which exports mainly to the Asian continent.

== Notes ==
=== Further reading ===
- https://www.latercera.com/diario-impreso/fallece-carlos-abumohor-emblematico-empresario-del-negocio-textil-y-bancario/
- https://roadshow.cl/querella-de-familia-abumohor-acusa-a-alvaro-saieh-de-una-megaestafa/
- https://www.proquest.com/docview/2606856098/47373346259747DDPQ/14?accountid=196403&sourcetype=Newspapers
- https://www.proquest.com/docview/336516917/47373346259747DDPQ/13?accountid=196403&sourcetype=Newspapers
- https://www.proquest.com/docview/194261114/47373346259747DDPQ/1?accountid=196403&sourcetype=Trade%20Journals
