= Saieh =

Saieh or El-Saieh is a surname. Notable people with the surname include:

- Álvaro Saieh (born 1949), Colombian academic, economist, and businessman
- Issa El-Saieh (1919–2005), Haitian musician, composer, and businessman
- Soledad Saieh (1972–2017), Chilean businesswoman, film producer, and cultural manager

== See also ==
- Issa El-Saieh & His Orchestra discography
