= Grocery store =

Retail store that sells food and household supplies

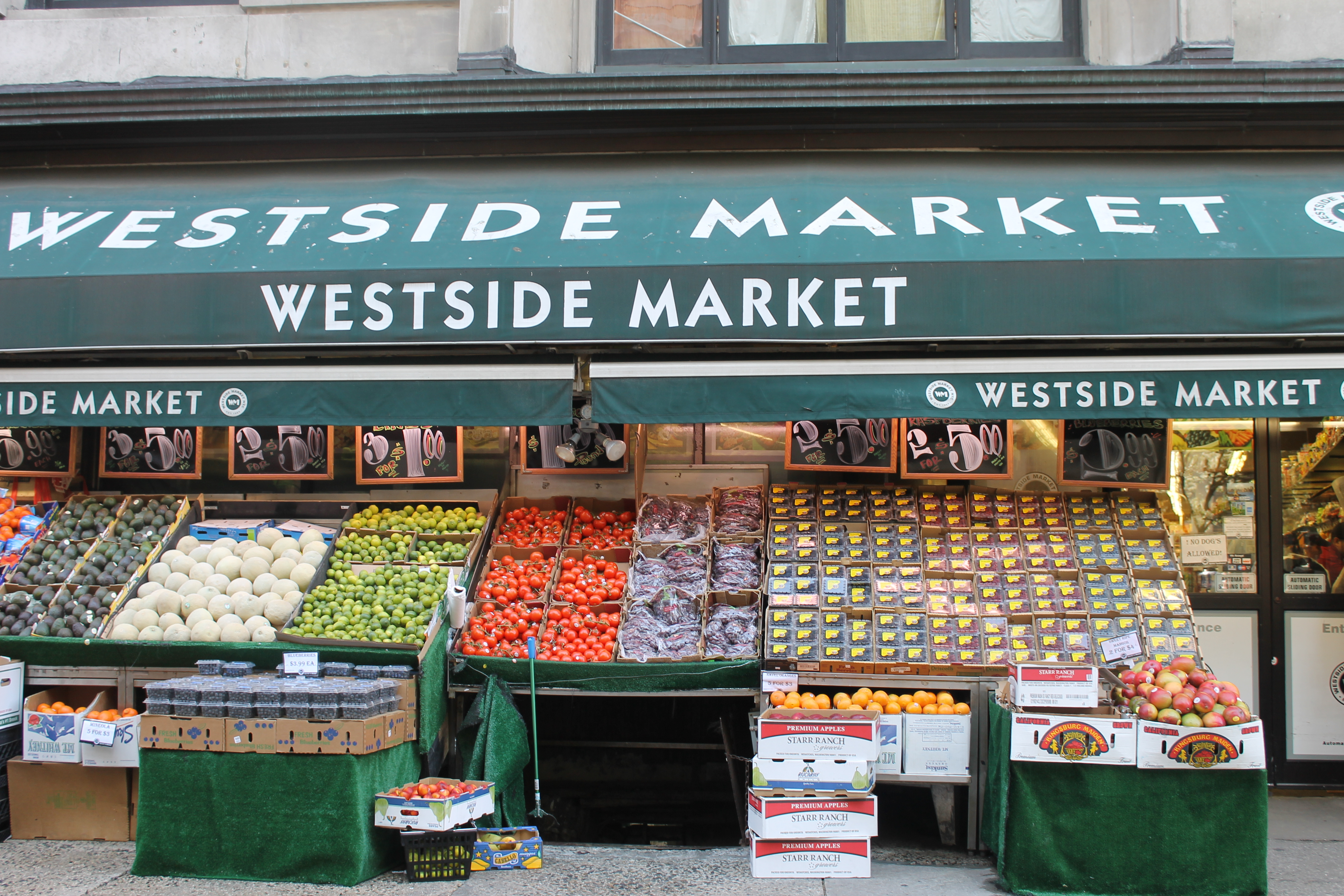
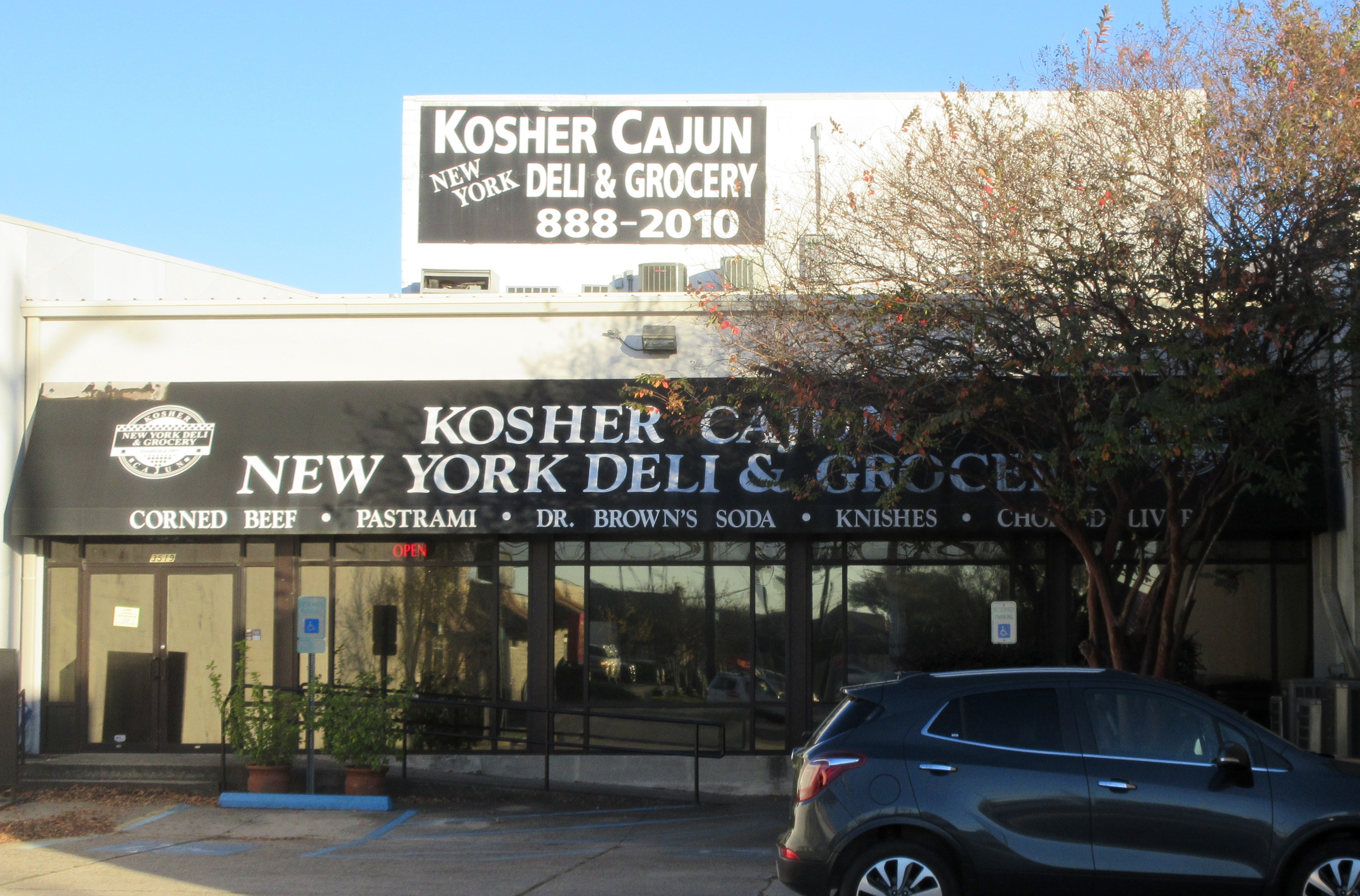
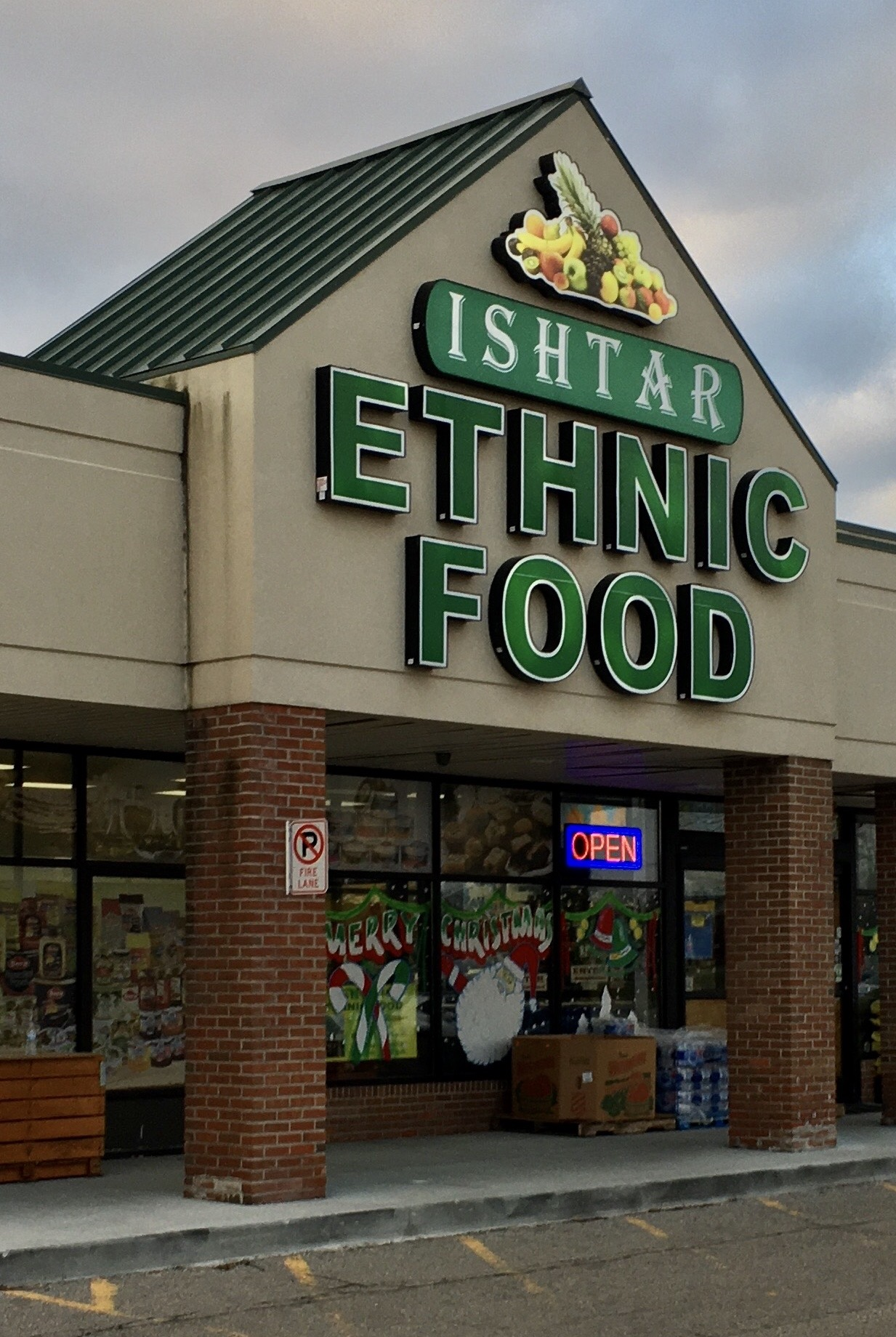
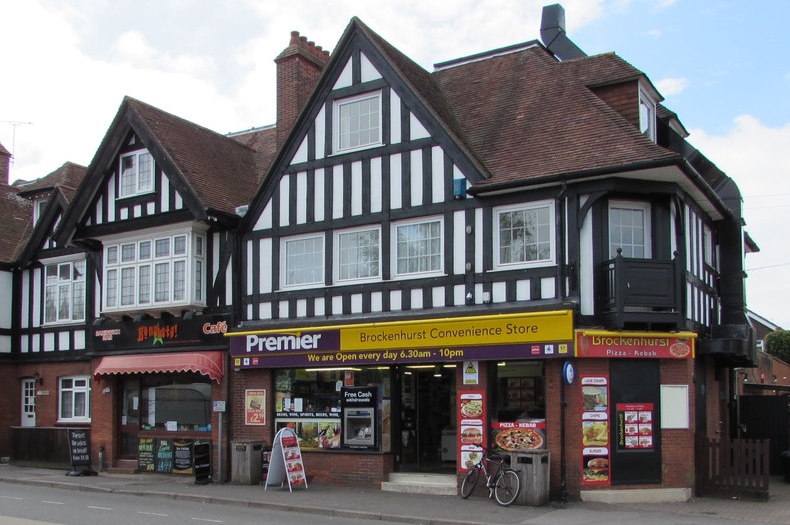
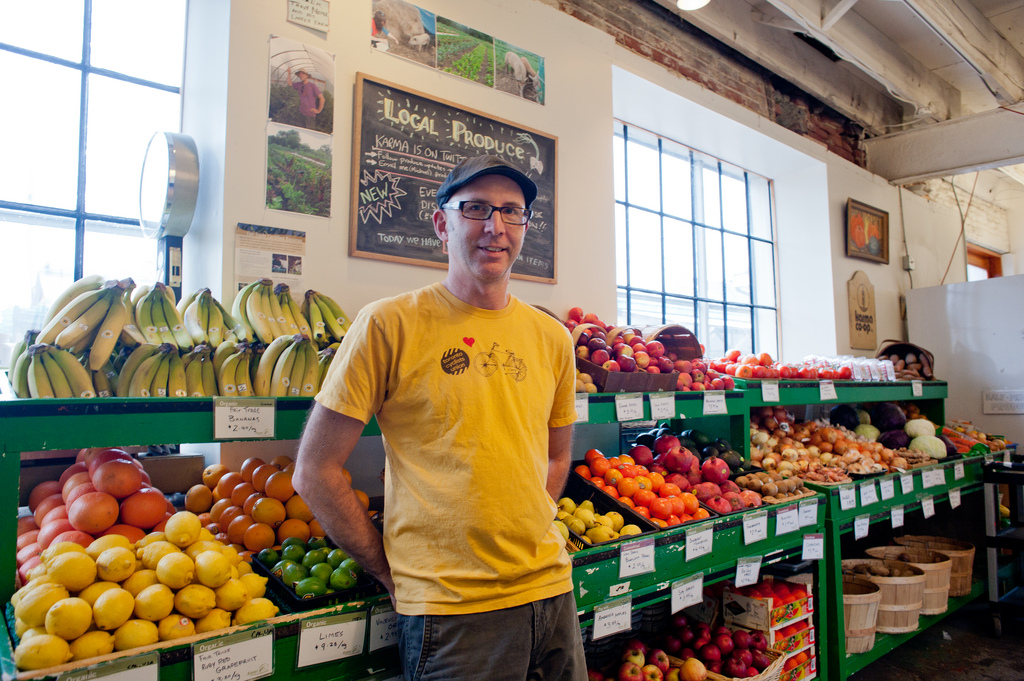
- Grocery store on the Upper West Side of Manhattan Delicatessen and grocery in Metairie, Louisiana Ethnic grocery, West Bloomfield Twp, Michigan Convenience store in Brockenhurst, United Kingdom Organic grocery in Toronto, Canada

A grocery store (AE), grocery shop or grocer's shop (BE) or simply grocery is a retail store that primarily retails a general range of food products, which may be fresh or packaged. In everyday US usage, however, "grocery store" is a synonym for supermarket, and is not used to refer to other types of stores that sell groceries. In the UK, shops that sell food are distinguished as grocers or grocery shops (though in everyday use, people usually use either the term "supermarket" or a "corner shop".)

Larger types of stores that sell groceries, such as supermarkets and hypermarkets, usually stock significant amounts of non-food products, such as clothing and household items. Small grocery stores that sell mainly fruit and vegetables are known as greengrocers (Britain) or produce markets (US), and small grocery stores that predominantly sell prepared food, such as candy and snacks, are known as convenience shops or delicatessens.

A grocer is the name of a bulk seller of food at a grocery store.

== Definition ==
The definition of "grocery store" varies; US and Canadian official definitions of "grocery store" exclude some businesses that sell groceries, such as convenience stores.

=== United States ===
In the United States:

- The Merriam-Webster Dictionary defines a grocery store as "a store that sells food and household supplies: supermarket". In other words, in common US usage, "grocery store" is a synonym for supermarket. The Oxford English Dictionary notes that the term "grocery store" in American English is often used to mean "supermarket".
- The US and Canadian governments have a wider definition of grocery stores, not limiting them to supermarkets. The category of business (NAICS code 4551) "Grocery stores" is defined as "primarily engaged in retailing a general line of food products", and the subcategory (NAICS code 455110), "Supermarkets and Other Grocery (except Convenience) Stores" is defined as "establishments generally known as supermarkets and grocery stores, primarily engaged in retailing a general line of food, such as canned and frozen foods; fresh fruits and vegetables; and fresh and prepared meats, fish, and poultry. Included in this industry are delicatessen-type establishments primarily engaged in retailing a general line of food.

=== United Kingdom ===
In the United Kingdom, terms in common usage include "supermarket" (for larger grocery stores), "corner shop", "convenience shop", or "grocery" (meaning a grocery shop) for smaller stores. "Grocery store", being a North American term, is not used. The Oxford English Dictionary states that a "grocery" is (especially in British English) a shop that sells food and other things used in the home.

The UK government does not define "grocery (shop)" or "supermarket" nor make a distinction between them, but defines the types of store formats (whether they sell groceries, or otherwise):

- "One-stop shops" as over 1,400 square metres (15,000 square feet)
- "Mid-range stores": between 280 and 1,400 square metres (3,000 and 15,000 square feet), and
- "Convenience stores": less than 280 square metres (3,000 square feet)

=== India ===
90% of the 810-billion-dollar Indian food and grocery market sales are at the 12 million small grocery stores, called kirana.

== History ==
=== Early history ===
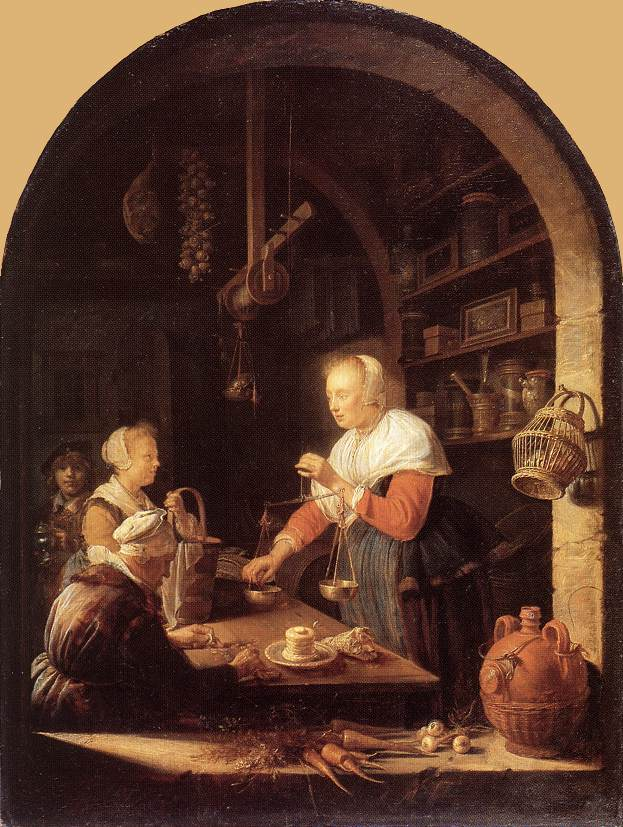
Painting: 'The Grocer's Shop,' 1647

Beginning as early as the 14th century, a grocer (or "purveyor") was a dealer in comestible dry goods such as spices, peppers, sugar, and (later) cocoa and chocolate, tea, and coffee. Because these items were often bought in bulk, they were named after the French word for wholesaler, or "grossier". This, in turn, is derived from the Medieval Latin term "grossarius", from which the term "gross" (meaning a quantity of 12 dozen, or 144) is also derived.

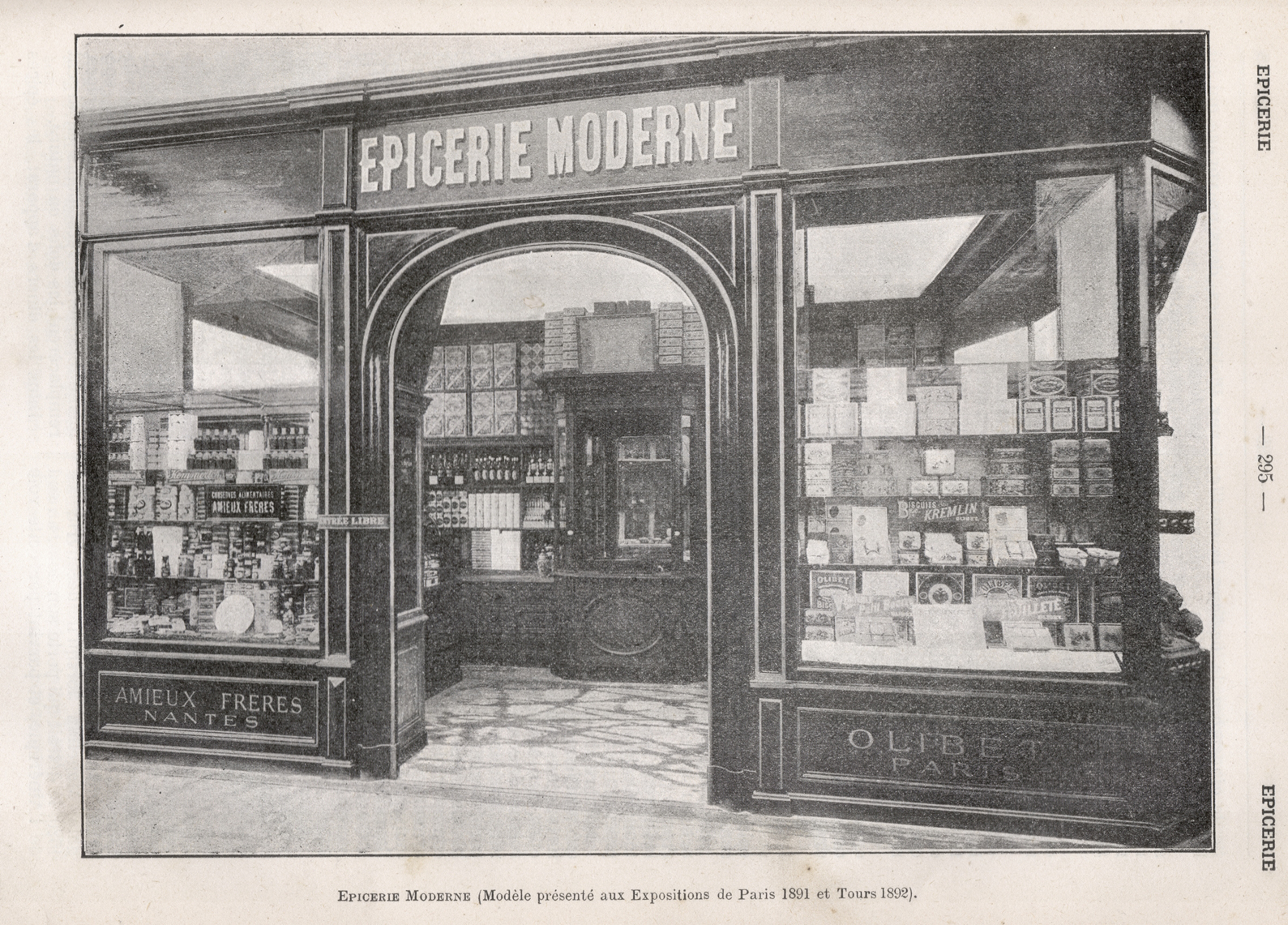
Grocer's shop in Paris, France, 1904

From the late 1600s until the 1850s, the word "grocery" referred to a place where people went to drink.

As increasing numbers of staple food-stuffs became available in cans and other less-perishable packaging, the trade expanded its province. Today, grocers deal in a wide range of staple food-stuffs including such perishables as dairy products, meats, and produce. Such goods are, hence, called groceries.

Many rural areas still contain general stores that sell goods ranging from tobacco products to imported napkins. Traditionally, general stores have offered credit to their customers, a system of payment that works on trust rather than modern credit cards. This allowed farm families to buy staples until their harvest could be sold.

=== Modernization ===
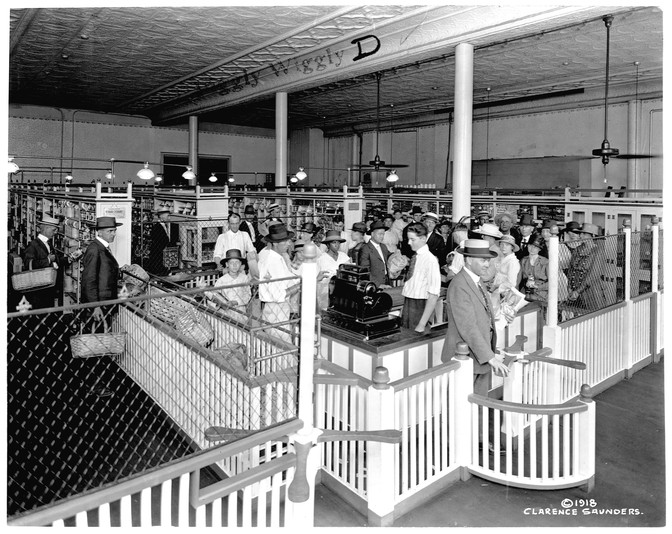
Piggly Wiggly was the first self-service grocery store, opening in 1916.

The first self-service grocery store, Piggly Wiggly, was opened in 1916 in Memphis, Tennessee, by Clarence Saunders, an inventor and entrepreneur. Prior to this innovation, grocery stores operated "over the counter," with customers asking a grocer to retrieve items from inventory. Saunders' invention allowed a much smaller number of clerks to service the customers, proving successful (according to a 1929 issue of Time) "partly because of its novelty, partly because neat packages and large advertising appropriations have made retail grocery selling almost an automatic procedure."

The early supermarkets began as chains of grocer's shops. The development of supermarkets and other large grocery stores has meant that smaller grocery stores often must create a niche market by selling unique, premium quality, or ethnic foods that are not easily found in supermarkets. A small grocery store may also compete by locating in a mixed commercial-residential area close to, and convenient for, its customers. Organic foods are also becoming a more popular niche market for smaller stores.

Grocery stores operate in many different styles ranging from rural family-owned operations, such as IGAs, to boutique chains, such as Whole Foods Market and Trader Joe's, to larger supermarket chain stores such as Walmart and Kroger Marketplace. In some places, food cooperatives, or "co-op" markets, owned by their own shoppers, have been popular. However, there has recently been a trend towards larger stores serving larger geographic areas. Very large "all-in-one" hypermarkets such as Walmart, Target, and Meijer have recently forced consolidation of the grocery businesses in some areas, and the entry of variety stores such as Dollar General into rural areas has undercut many traditional grocery stores. The global buying power of such very efficient companies has put an increased financial burden on traditional local grocery stores as well as the national supermarket chains, and many have been caught up in the retail apocalypse of the 2010s.

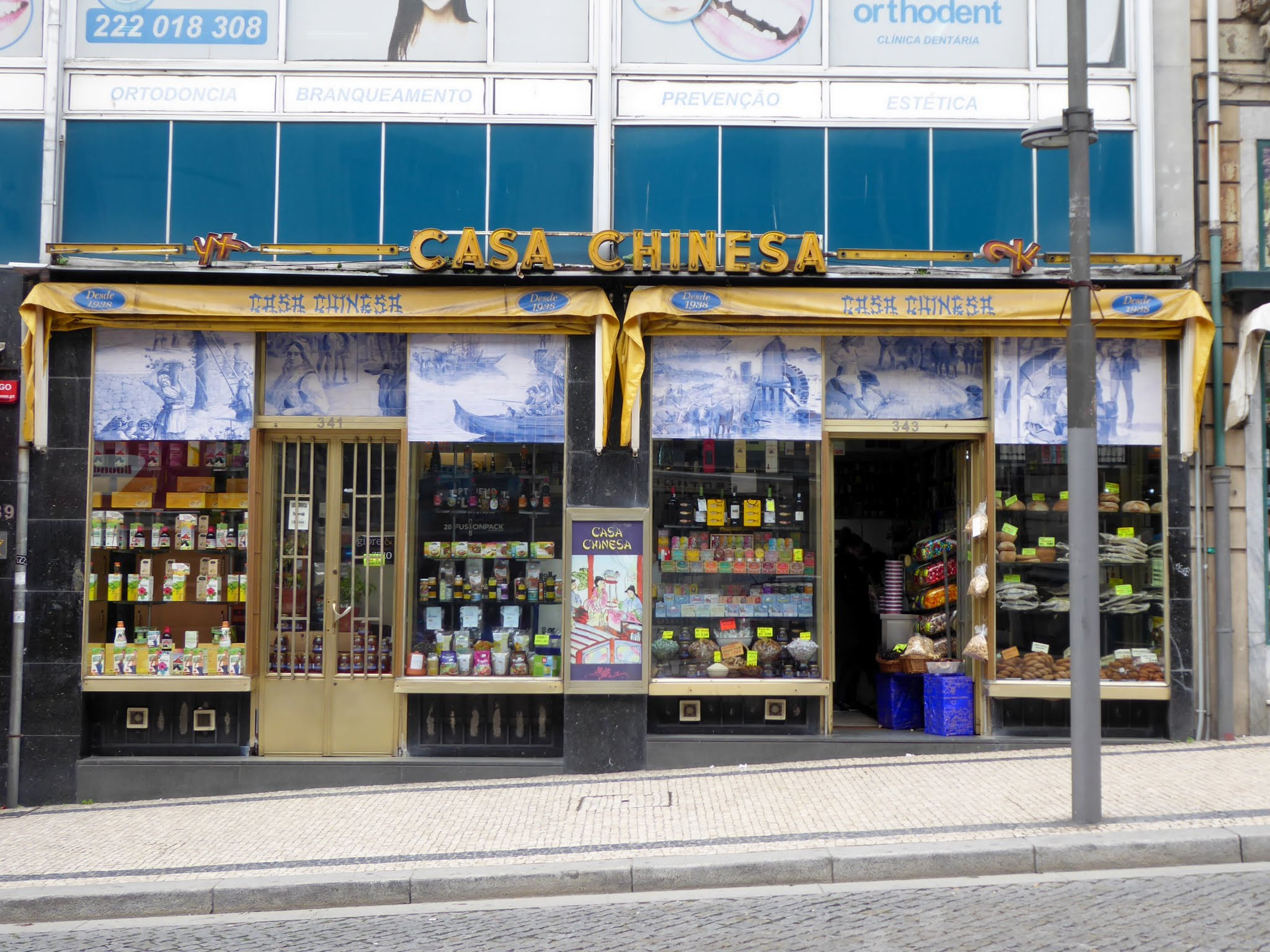
Grocery store in Porto, Portugal

Many European cities are so dense in population and buildings that large supermarkets, in the American sense, cannot replace the neighbourhood grocer's shop. However, "Metro" shops have been appearing in town and city centres in many countries, leading to the decline of independent smaller shops. Large out-of-town supermarkets and hypermarkets, such as Tesco and Sainsbury's in the United Kingdom, have been steadily weakening trade from smaller shops. Many grocery chains like Spar or Mace are taking over the regular family business model.

== Types ==
Grocery stores can be small or large physical stores or electronic (online) stores mostly found in larger populated areas.

The US FMI food industry association, drawing on research by Willard Bishop, defines the following formats (store types) that sell groceries:

Store type	Definition as per the US FMI Food Industry Association/Bishop
Traditional grocery
Traditional supermarket	Stores offering a full line of groceries, meat, and produce with at least US$2 million USD in annual sales and up to 15% of their sales in general merchandise (GM) and health & beauty care (HBC). These stores typically carry anywhere from 15,000 to 60,000 SKUs (depending on the size of the store) and may offer a service deli, a service bakery, and/or a pharmacy e.g., Albertsons, Safeway, Kroger, and Prime Supermarket.
Fresh format	Different from traditional supermarkets and traditional natural food stores, fresh stores emphasize perishables and offer center-store assortments that differ from those of traditional retailers—especially in the areas of ethnic, natural, and organic, e.g., Whole Foods, The Fresh Market, and some independents.
Limited-assortment store	A low-priced grocery store that offers a limited assortment of center-store and perishable items (fewer than 2,000), e.g., Aldi, Lidl, Trader Joe's, and Save-A-Lot.
Super warehouse	A high-volume hybrid of a large traditional supermarket and a warehouse store. Super warehouse stores typically offer a full range of service departments, quality perishables, and reduced prices, e.g., Cub Foods, Food 4 Less, and Smart & Final.
Other (small grocery)	The small corner grocery store that carries a limited selection of staples and other convenience goods. These stores generate approximately $1 million in business annually.
Non-traditional grocery
Wholesale club	A membership retail/wholesale hybrid with a varied selection and limited variety of products presented in a warehouse-type environment. These approximately 120,000 square-foot stores have 60% to 70% GM/HBC and a grocery line dedicated to large sizes and bulk sales. Memberships include both business accounts and consumer groups, e.g., Sam's Club, Costco, and BJ's.
Supercenter	A hybrid of a large traditional supermarket and a mass merchandiser. Supercenters offer a wide variety of food, as well as non-food merchandise. These stores average more than 170,000 square feet and typically devote as much as 40% of the space to grocery items, e.g., Walmart Supercenter, Super Target, Meijer, and Kroger Marketplace.
Dollar store	A small store format that traditionally sold staples and knickknacks, but now sales of food and consumable items at aggressive price points that account for at least 20%, and up to 66%, of their volume, e.g., Dollar General, Dollar Tree, Action, Pep&Co, Poundland, and Family Dollar.
Drug store	A prescription-based drug store that generates 20% or more of its total sales from consumables, general merchandise, and seasonal items. This channel includes major chain drug stores such as Walgreens, DM, AS Watson, and CVS.
Mass merchandiser	A large store selling primarily hardlines, clothing, electronics, and sporting goods but also carries grocery and non-edible grocery items. This channel includes traditional Walmart, Kmart, and Target.
Military (commissaries)	A format that looks like a conventional grocery store carrying groceries and consumables but is restricted to use by active or retired military personnel. Civilians may not shop at these stores (referred to as commissaries).
E-commerce (food and consumables)	Food and consumable products ordered using the internet via any devices, regardless of the method of payment or fulfillment. This channel includes Amazon and Peapod as well as the E-Commerce business generated by traditional brick & mortar retailers, e.g., Coborns (Coborns Delivers) and ShopRite (ShopRite Order, Pickup, Deliver and ShopRite Delivers). The other non-traditional retail segments above include their E-Commerce business.

=== Small format ===
==== Neighborhood grocery ====
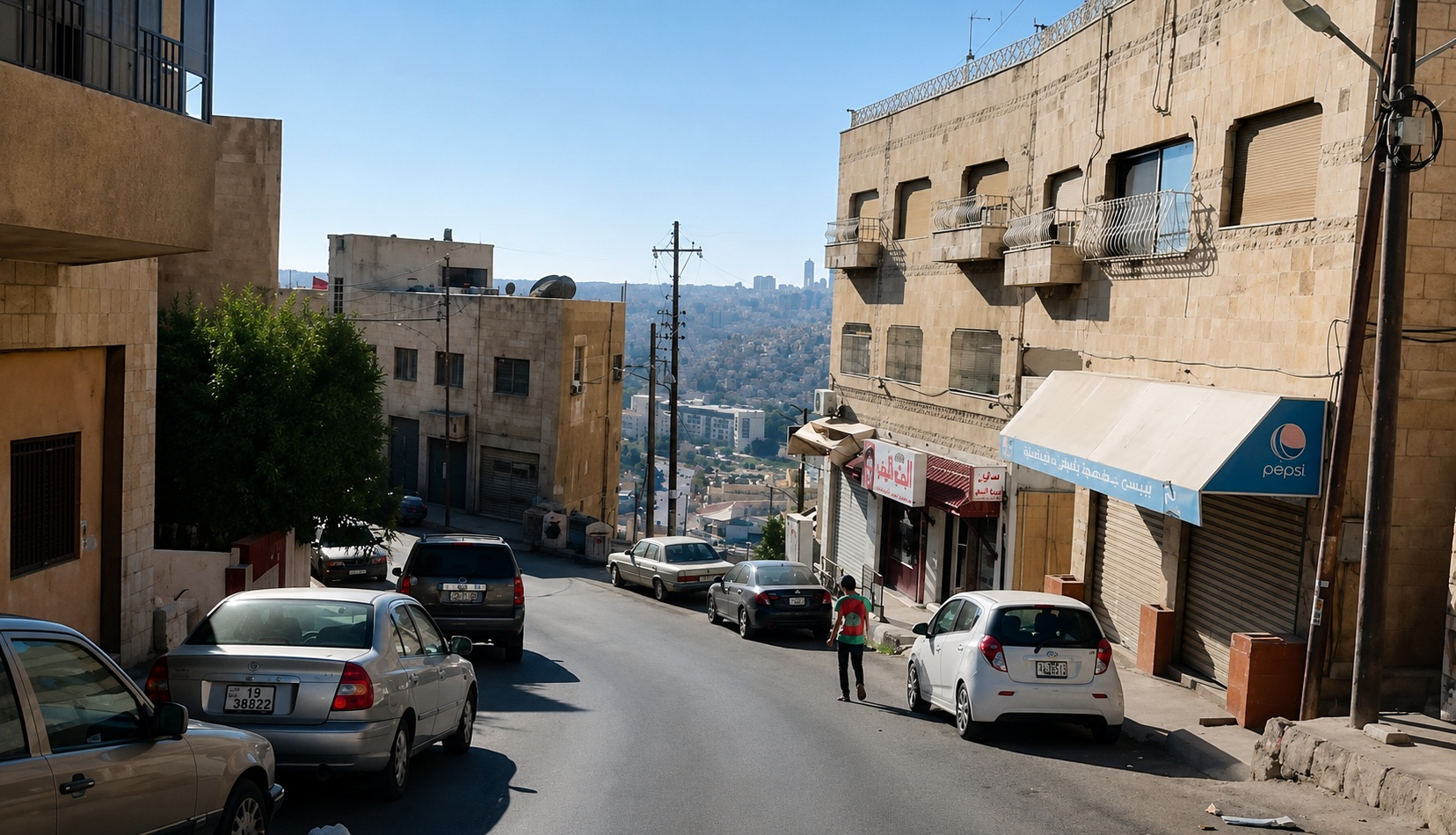
Corner stores in Amman, Jordan

In developing countries, often a significant portion of grocery shopping is done at so-called "mom-and-pop" (i.e., family-run), small grocery stores. 90% of the 810-billion-dollar Indian food and grocery market sales are at the 12 million small grocery stores, called kirana. Similarly, in Mexico, tiendas de la esquina (literally "corner stores") are still common places for people to buy groceries and sundries, even though they become less and less of the market over time.

==== Convenience store ====
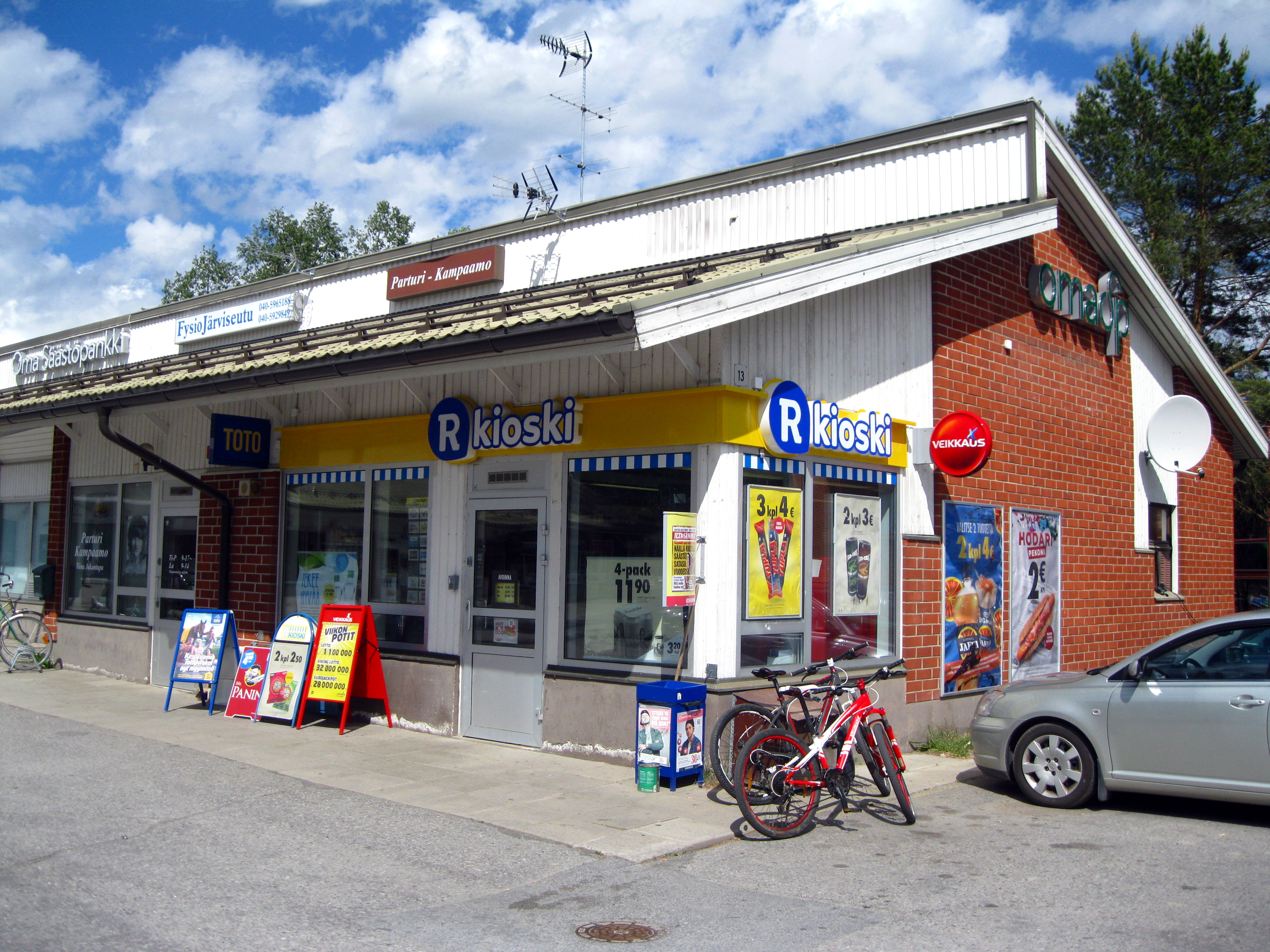
Convenience store in Vimpeli, Finland

A convenience shop is a small store that stocks a range of everyday items such as groceries, snack foods, candy, toiletries, soft drinks, tobacco products, and newspapers. They differ from general stores and village shops in that they are not in a rural location and are used as a convenient supplement to larger shops.

Although larger, newer convenience stores may have quite a broad range of items, the selection is still limited compared to supermarkets, and, in many stores, only 1 or 2 choices are available. Convenience stores usually charge significantly higher prices than ordinary grocery stores or supermarkets, which they make up for with convenience by serving more locations and having shorter cashier lines. Many convenience stores offer food ready to eat, such as breakfast sandwiches and other breakfast food.

==== Delicatessen ====
A delicatessen store is a type of food store where fine foods are sold. In this sense, the name is often abbreviated to deli. The term delicatessen means "delicacies" or "fine foods". In English, "delicatessen" originally meant only this specially prepared food.

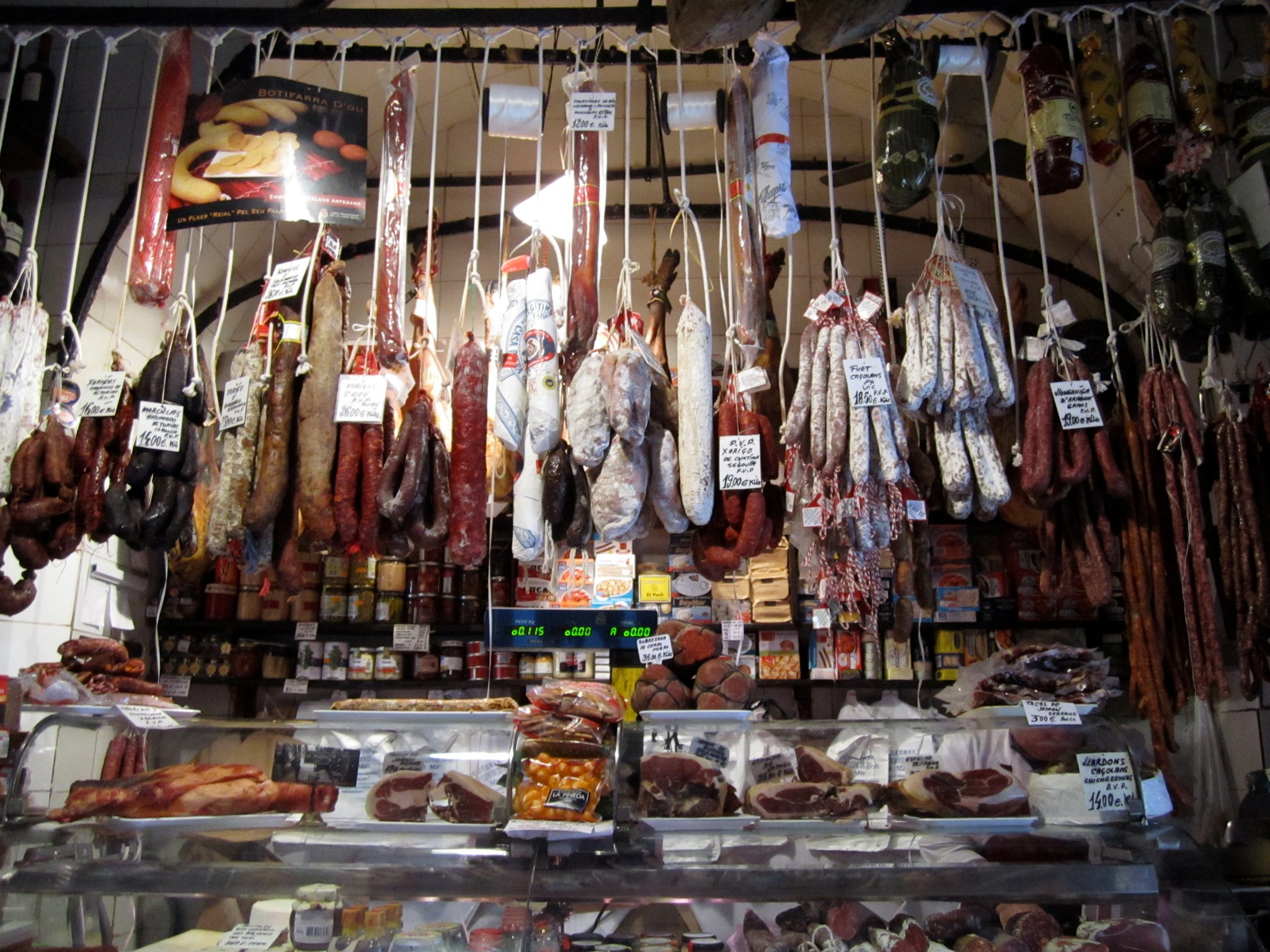
Delicatessen foods

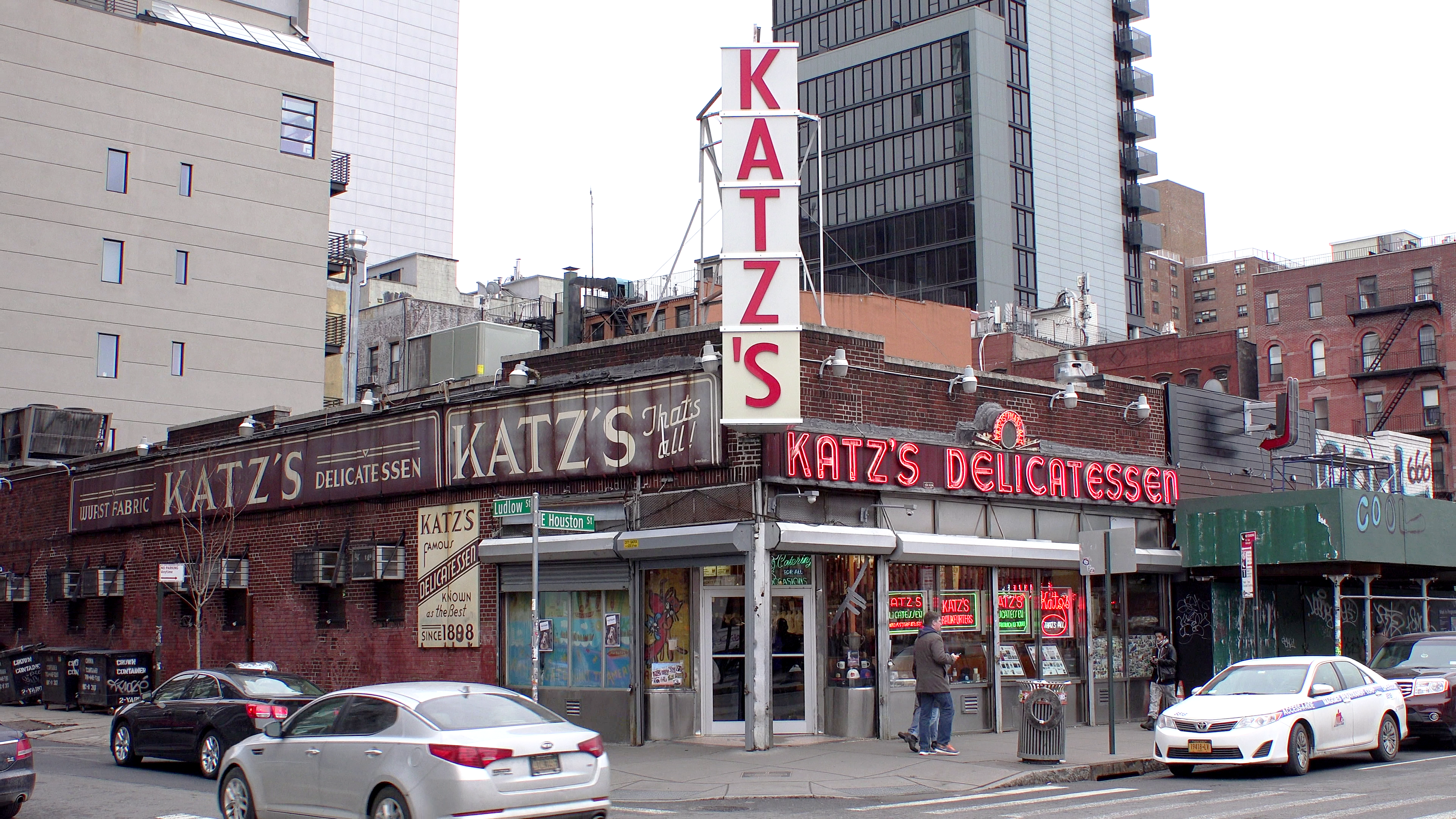
Delicatessen in New York City, New York

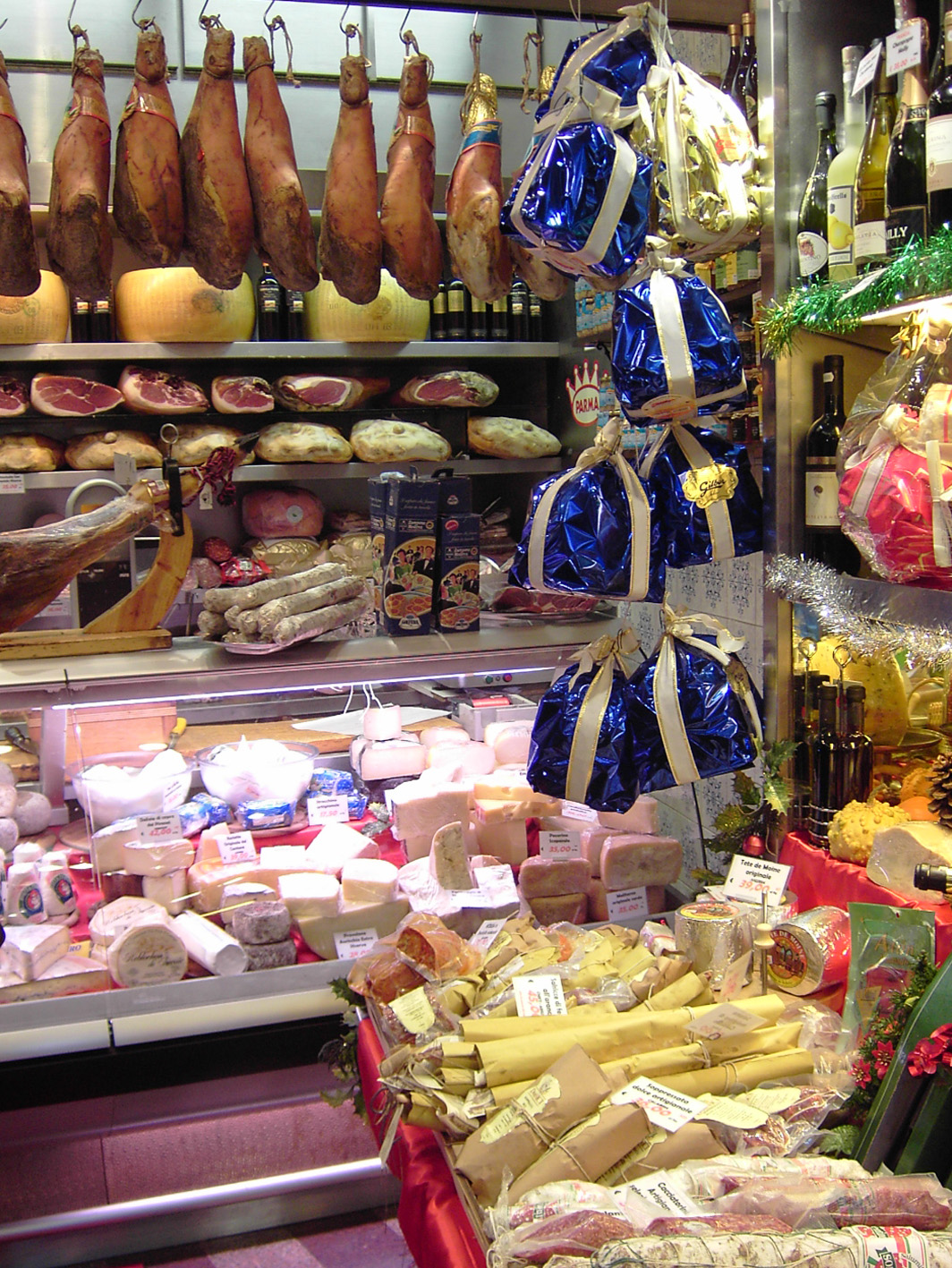
Delicatessen in a shop in Rome, Italy

==== Greengrocer ====
A greengrocer is a retail trader in fruit and vegetables; that is, in groceries that are mostly green in color. Greengrocer is primarily a British and Australian term, and greengrocers' shops were once common in cities, towns and villages.

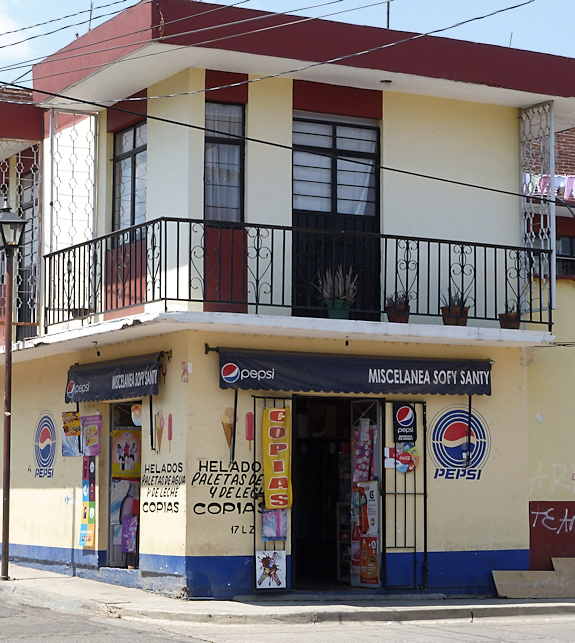
A miscelanea, a type of family-run convenience store in Mexico

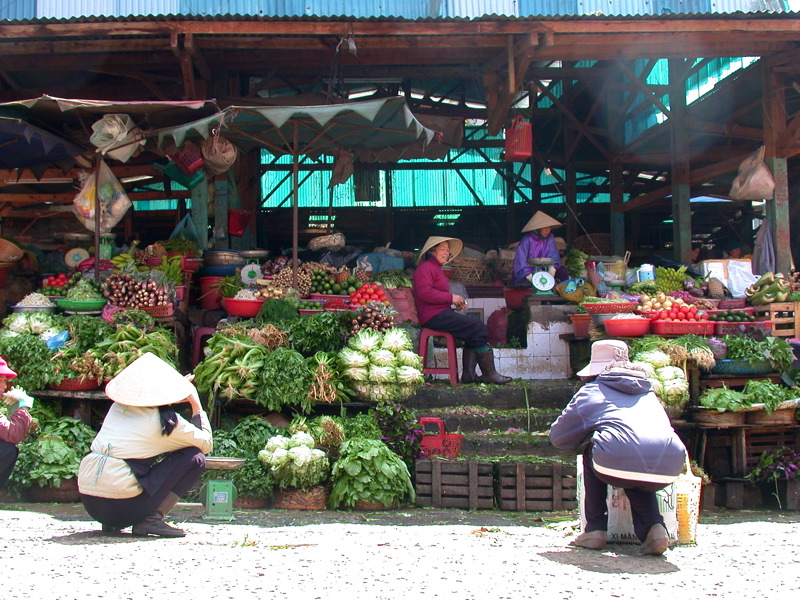
A greengrocer in Vietnam

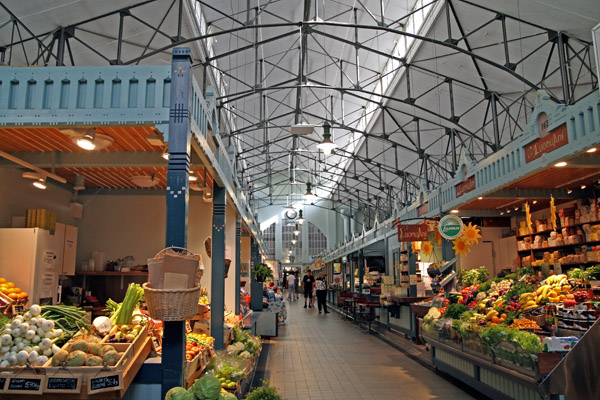
A greengrocer's in the Tampere Market Hall

==== Ethnic market ====
Some grocers specialize in the foods of certain countries or regions, such as Hispanic/Latin American, Chinese, Italian, Middle Eastern, Indian, Russian, or Polish. These stores are known in the US as ethnic markets, ethnic food markets, ethnic grocers, or ethnic grocery stores.

Types include Asian supermarkets outside of Asia, or a bodega or Hispanic supermarkets in the United States or a toko in the Netherlands.

A kosher supermarket or other establishment guided by religious food traditions would also typically have an association with certain ethnic cuisines, though not exclusively.

IBISWorld estimates US ethnic grocery stores will make up ca. $51 billion in sales, 6% of the total ca. $819 billion in 2023 US supermarket sales. The largest such chains in 2016 were Hispanic supermarkets Superior Grocers, with an estimated $ 1.6 billion in sales and El Súper-Bodega Latina, a division of Mexico's Chedraui Group, with estimated sales of $1.2 billion.

==== Health food store ====
A health food store is a type of grocery store that primarily sells health foods, organic foods, local produce, and often nutritional supplements. Health food stores typically offer a wider or more specialized selection of foods than conventional grocery stores for their customers, such as people with special dietary needs.

Health food stores became much more common in the 1960s in connection to the newly emerging ecology movement and counterculture.

==== Milk bar ====
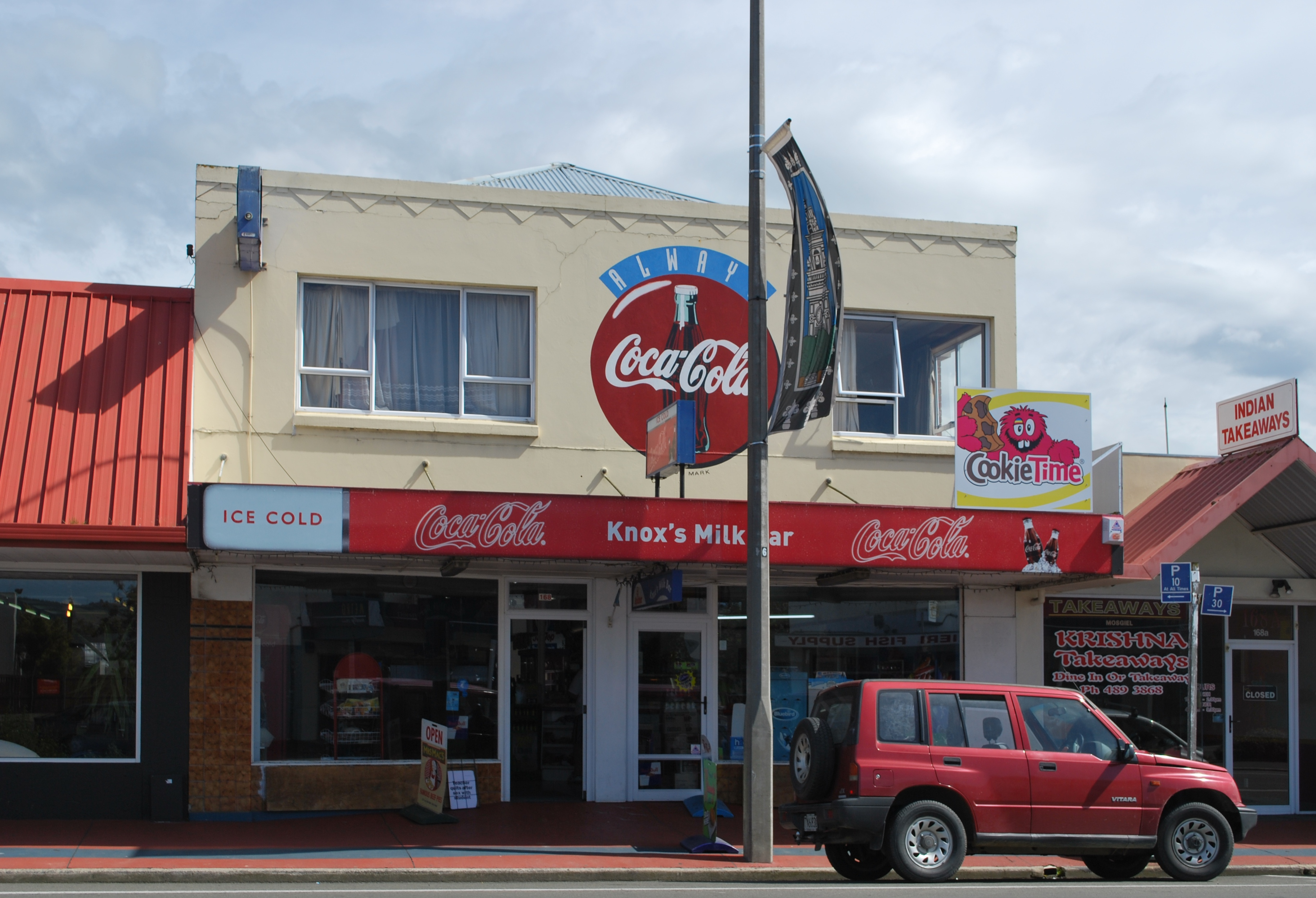
A milk bar in Mosgiel, New Zealand

In Australia and New Zealand, a milk bar is a suburban local general store or café. Similar terms include tuck shops, delicatessens or "delis", and corner shops. The first business using the name "milk bar" was started in India in 1930. By the late 1940s, milk bars had evolved to include not only groceries, but also became places where young people could buy ready-made food and non-alcoholic drinks and could socialise.

=== Large format ===
==== Supermarket ====
A supermarket, a large form of the traditional grocery store, is a self-service shop offering a wide variety of food and household products organized into aisles. The supermarket typically comprises meat, fresh produce, dairy, and baked goods aisles, along with shelf space reserved for canned and packaged goods as well as for various non-food items such as kitchenware, household cleaners, pharmacy products and pet supplies.

Other services offered at some supermarkets may include those of banks, cafés, childcare centres/creches, photo processing, video rentals, pharmacies and/or petrol stations.

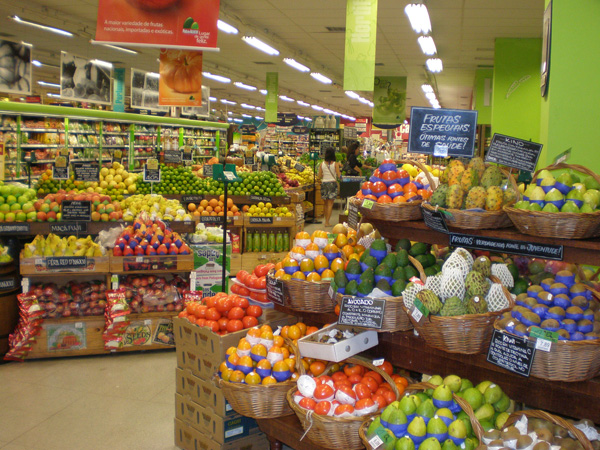
The produce section in a supermarket

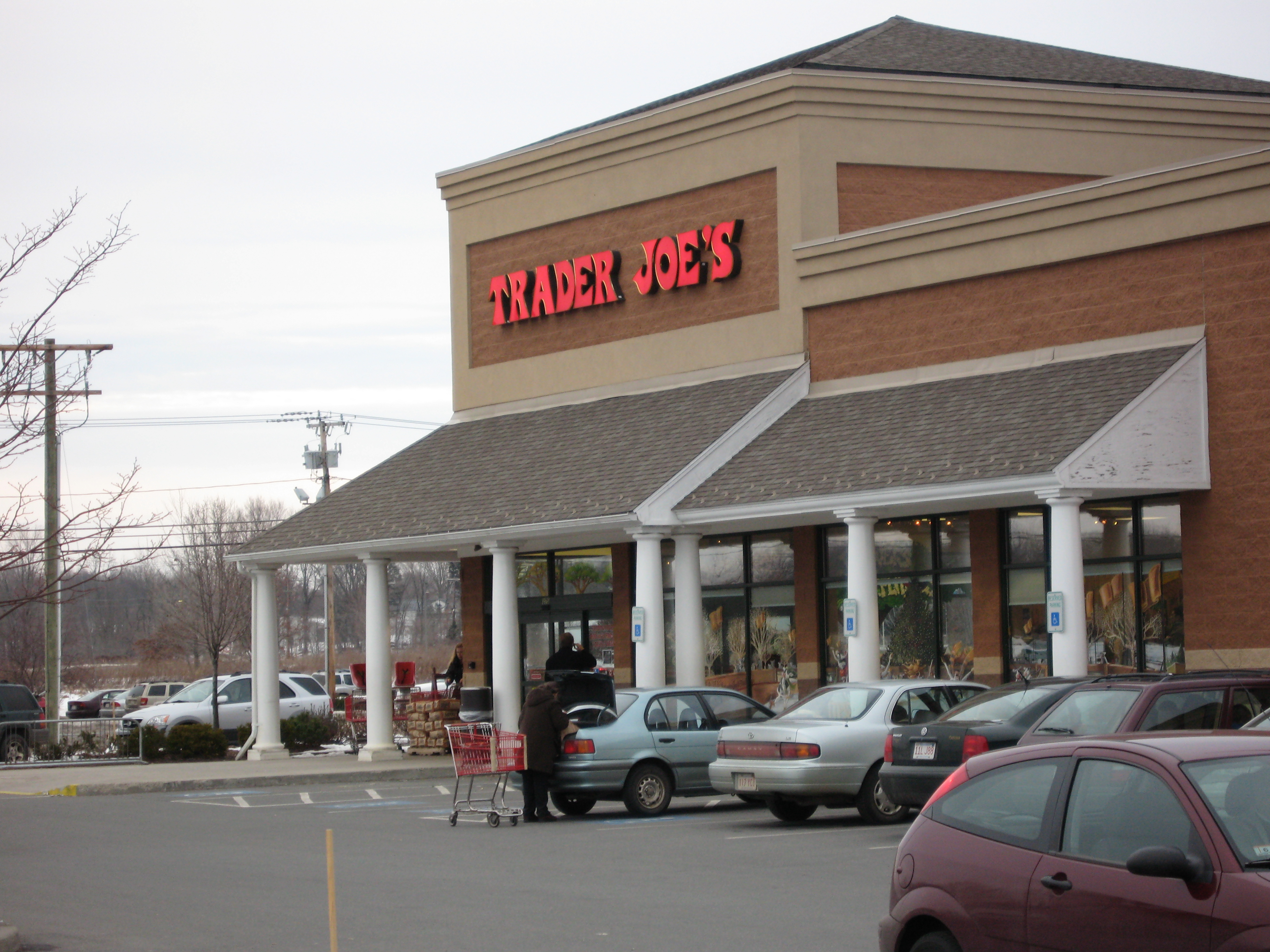
Store in Hadley, Massachusetts

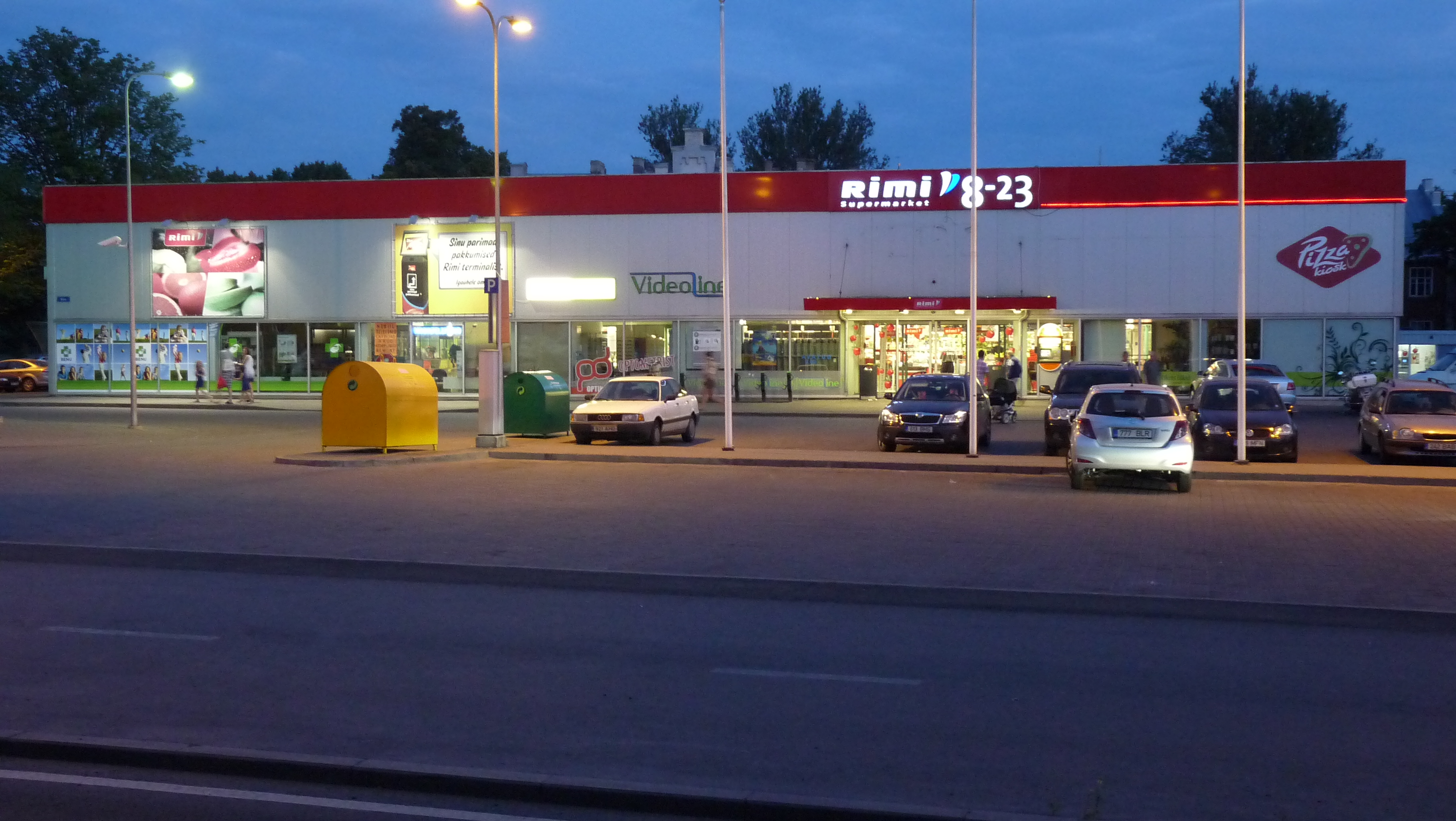
Supermarket in Tallinn, Estonia

==== Hypermarket ====
A hypermarket is a superstore combining a supermarket and a department store. The result is an expansive retail facility carrying a wide range of products under one roof, including a full groceries line and general merchandise. Another category of stores sometimes included in the hypermarket category is the membership-based wholesale warehouse clubs that are popular in North America.

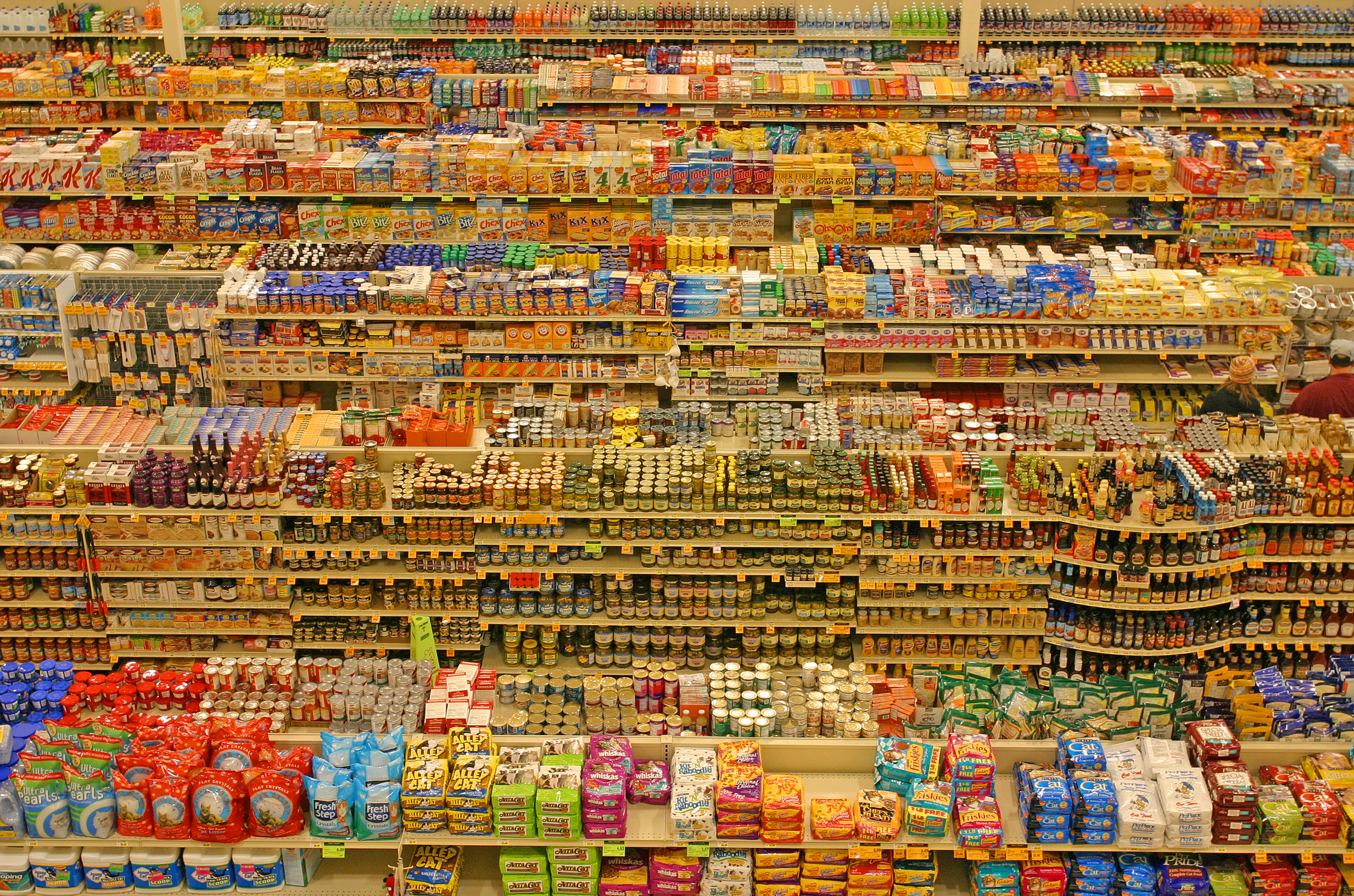
Packaged food aisles in a Fred Meyer, a hypermarket chain in the Pacific Northwest

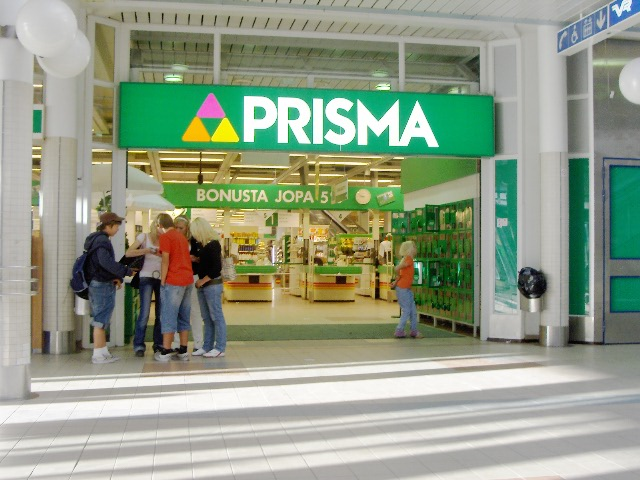
The entrance of the hypermarket in Malmi, Helsinki, Finland

=== Online grocery stores ===
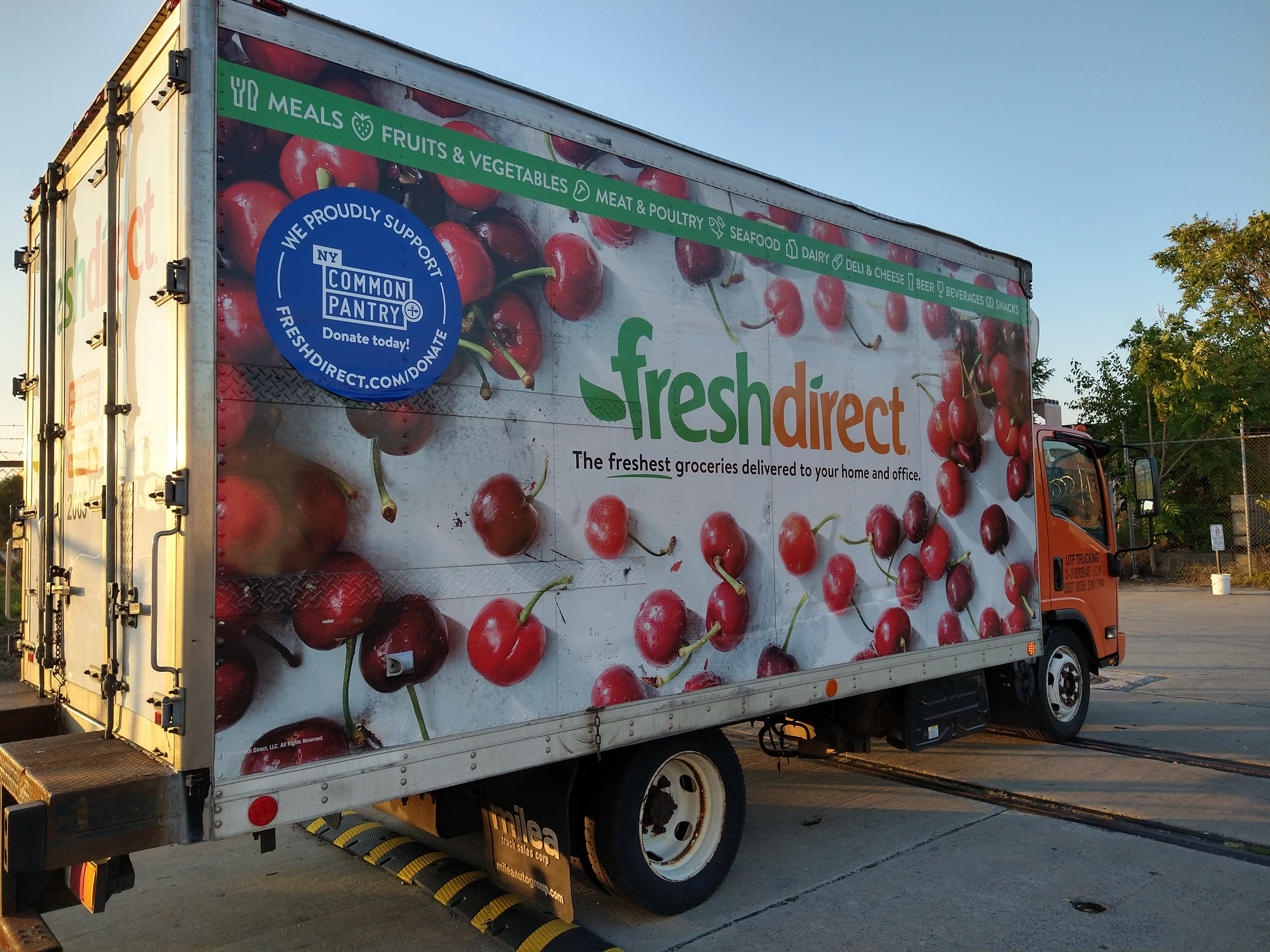
Online grocer delivery truck

An online grocer is a recent phenomenon that has developed as a type of e-commerce. Several online grocery stores exist, one of the oldest available in the US being Peapod. Nowadays, many online grocery stores such as Netgrocer, MyBrands, Efooddepot and many more that all aim to provide quality food products with timely delivery and convenience of ordering online. Other large retailers in the US have started similar models, including AmazonFresh and Prime Pantry, both run by Amazon.com, Walmart's To-Go service, and smaller companies like Yummy.com and RelayFoods. In the US, sales from online grocers in 2013 were $15 billion. Online grocery stores are more popular in Europe, where sales from 2012 in Britain alone were €7.1 billion, and in certain markets are projected to double from 2012 to 2016.

== Regional variations ==
=== Europe ===
Larger grocer complexes that include other facilities, such as petrol stations, are especially common in the United Kingdom, where major chains such as Sainsbury's and Tesco have many locations operating under this format. Traditional shops throughout Europe have been preserved because of their history and their classic appearance. They are sometimes still found in rural areas, although they are rapidly disappearing.

=== South America ===
Grocery stores in South America have been growing fast since the early 1980s. A large percentage of food sales and other articles take place in grocery stores today. Some examples are the Chilean chains Cencosud (Jumbo and Santa Isabel covering Chile, Argentina, Brazil and Peru), Walmart (Lider and Ekono) as well as Falabella (Tottus in Chile and Peru and Supermercados San Francisco in Chile). These three chains are subsidiaries of large retail companies which also have other kinds of business units, such as department stores and home improvement outlets. All three also operate their own credit cards, which are a key driver for sales, and they also sell insurance and operate travel agencies. These companies also run some malls in countries such as Argentina, Chile, Peru and Colombia.

Two other chains started in 2008: Unimarc, which bought several small local chains and has over 20% of the grocery segment in Chile; and Southern Cross, a Chilean Investment Fund that has around 8.6% of the supermarket segment, mainly oriented to the southern areas of the country. In Puerto Rico, popular grocery stores include Pueblo Supermarkets and Amigo.

=== North America ===
In some countries such as the United States, grocery stores descended from trading posts, which sold not only food but clothing, furniture, household items, tools, and other miscellaneous merchandise. These trading posts evolved into larger retail businesses known as general stores. These facilities generally dealt only in "dry" goods such as baking soda, canned foods, dry beans, and flour. Consumers obtained perishable foods from specialty markets, such as fresh meat or sausages from a butcher and milk from a local dairy, while eggs and vegetables were either produced by families themselves, bartered for with neighbors, or purchased at a farmers' market or a local greengrocer.

In the US, there are many larger chain stores, but there are also many small chains and independent grocery stores. About 11% of groceries are sold by a grocery store that is either independent or in a chain of just one, two, or three stores, making the independent stores, taken collectively, bigger than the biggest chains.

Most food in the US is bought at traditional brick-and-mortar grocery stores. As of 2019, about 3% of food was bought from an online retailer such as Amazon.com.

The economic trends affecting grocery stores include:

- In every decade since the 1960s, Americans have spent an increasing share of their money on eating at restaurants, which reduces their need to buy groceries.
- Groceries are sold by many other stores, such as convenience stores, drug stores, and dollar stores. The result of retail channel blurring is that even when people are buying groceries, only about half of them are buying groceries from a grocery store.
- Online sales of food are small but increasing. People who buy groceries from an internet retailer or a meal kit company have less need to buy groceries from a grocery store.
- People want to buy foods that reflect local and regional specialties. Sales of national brands, such as Nabisco cookies and crackers, have declined, and the companies have responded by changing their marketing approach. The reduction in advertising has resulted in fewer sales at the grocery store.

== Food marketing ==
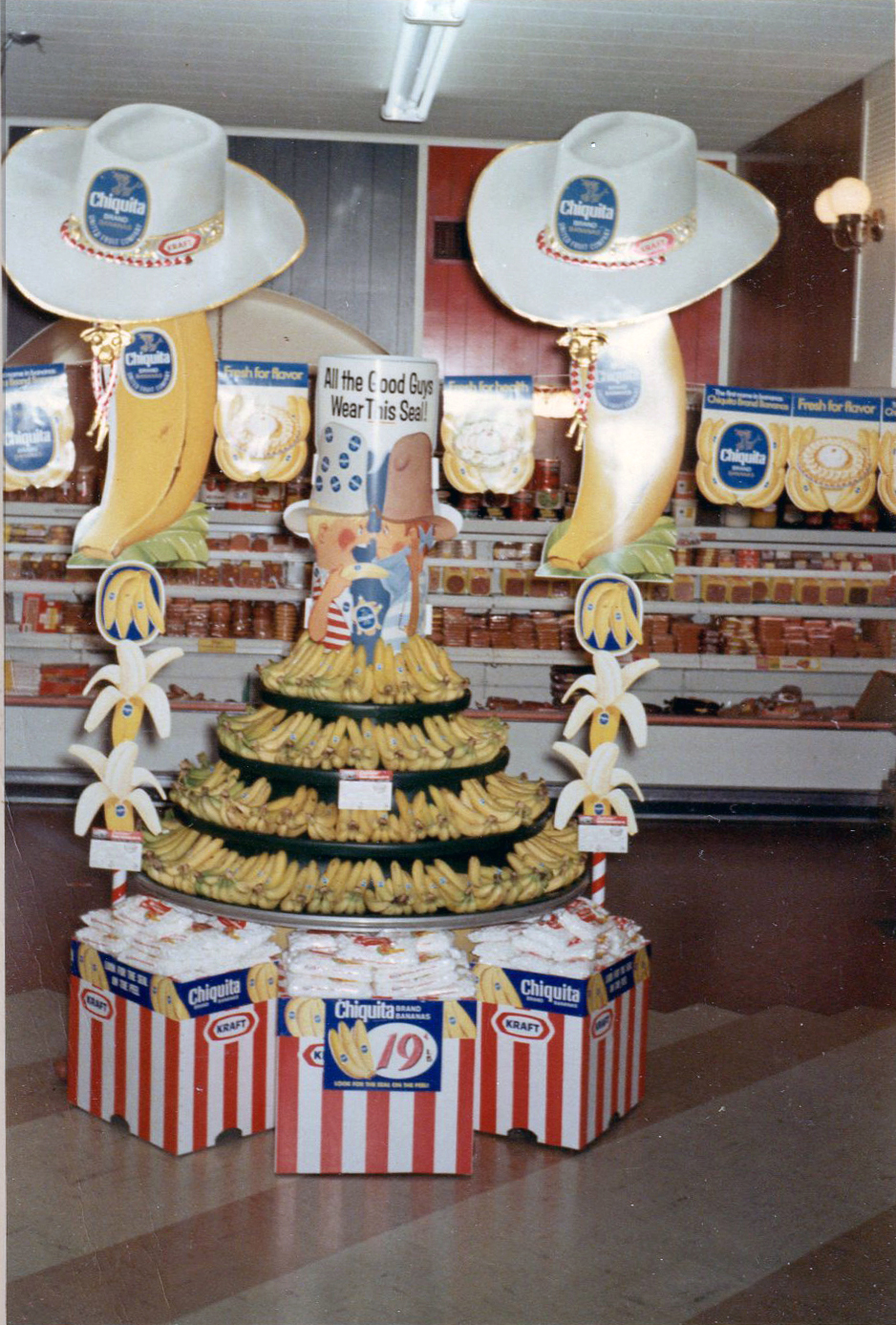
Grocery store display in 1967

Food marketing brings together the producer and the consumer. It is the chain of activities that brings food from "farm gate to plate". The marketing of even a single food product can be a complicated process involving many producers and companies. For example, 56 companies are involved in making one can of chicken noodle soup. These businesses include not only chicken and vegetable processors, but also the companies that transport the ingredients and those who print labels and manufacture cans. The food marketing system is the largest direct and indirect non-government employer in the United States.

In the pre-modern era, the sale of surplus food took place once a week when farmers took their wares on market day into the local village marketplace. Here food was sold to grocers for sale in their local shops for purchase by local consumers. With the onset of industrialization and the development of the food processing industry, a wider range of food could be sold and distributed in distant locations. Typically, early grocery shops would be counter-based where purchasers told the shop-keeper what they wanted and the shop-keeper would get it for them.

In the 20th century, supermarkets were born. Supermarkets brought with them a self service approach to shopping using shopping carts, and were able to offer quality food at lower cost through economies of scale and reduced staffing costs. In the latter part of the 20th century, this has been further revolutionized by the development of vast warehouse-sized, out-of-town supermarkets, selling a wide range of food from around the world.

Unlike food processors, food retailing is a two-tier market in which a small number of very large companies control a large proportion of supermarkets. The supermarket giants wield great purchasing power over farmers and processors, and strong influence over consumers. Less than 10% of consumer spending on food goes to farmers, with larger percentages going to advertising, transportation, and intermediate corporations.

== Prices ==
It was reported on March 24, 2008, that consumers worldwide faced rising food prices. Reasons for this development include changes in the weather and dramatic changes in the global economy including higher oil prices, lower food reserves, and growing consumer demand in China and India.

The US Labor Department has calculated that food purchased at home and in restaurants is 13% of household purchases, behind 32% for housing and 18% for transportation. The average US family spent $280 per month or $3,305 per year at grocery stores in 2004. The newsletter Dollar Stretcher survey estimated $149 a month for a single person, $257 for a couple and $396 for a family of four.

The average net profit margins of competitive grocery stores tend to be lower than in other market sectors.

== Food waste ==
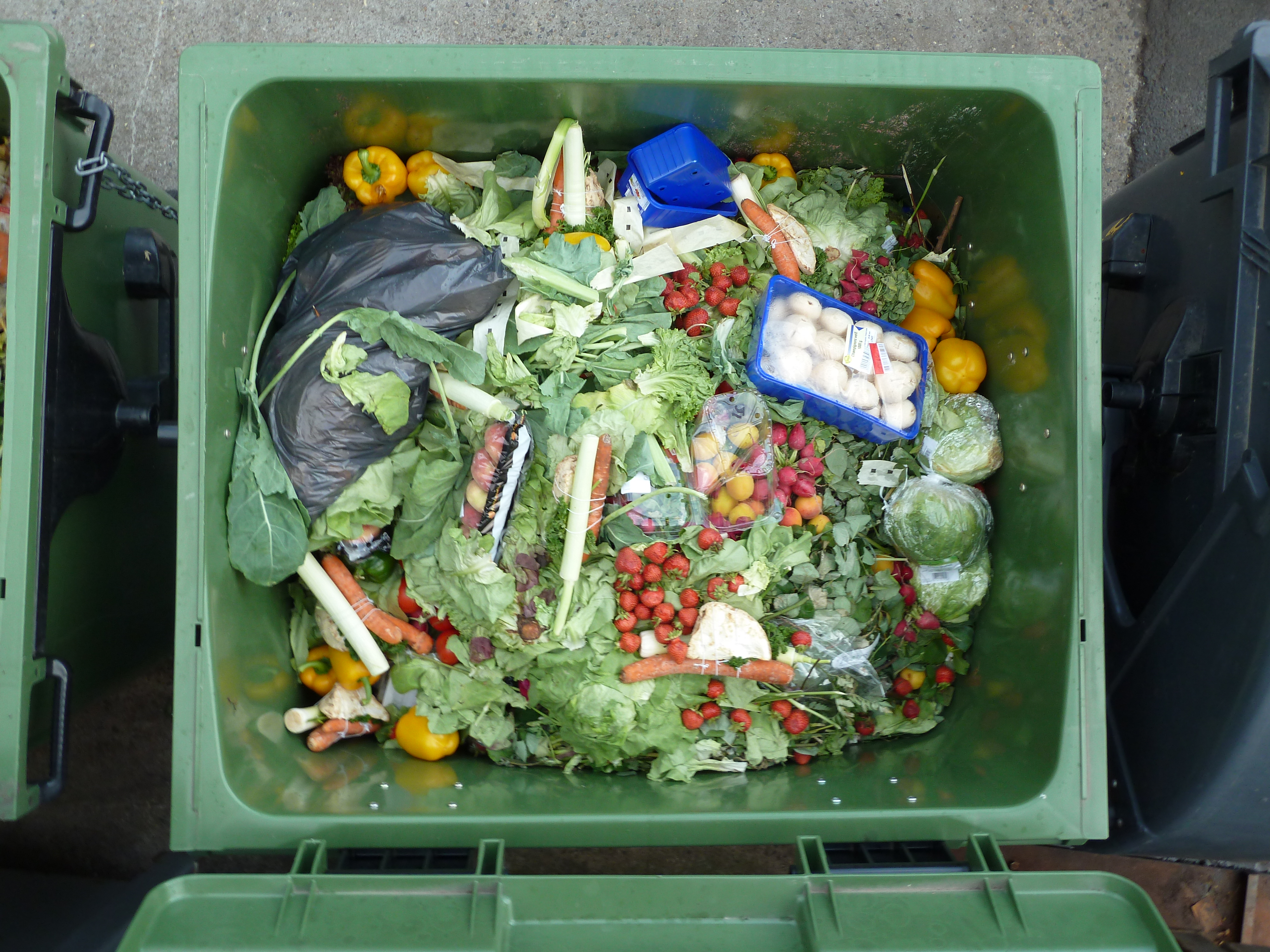
A large quantity of mostly discarded vegetables that would have still been safe to eat.

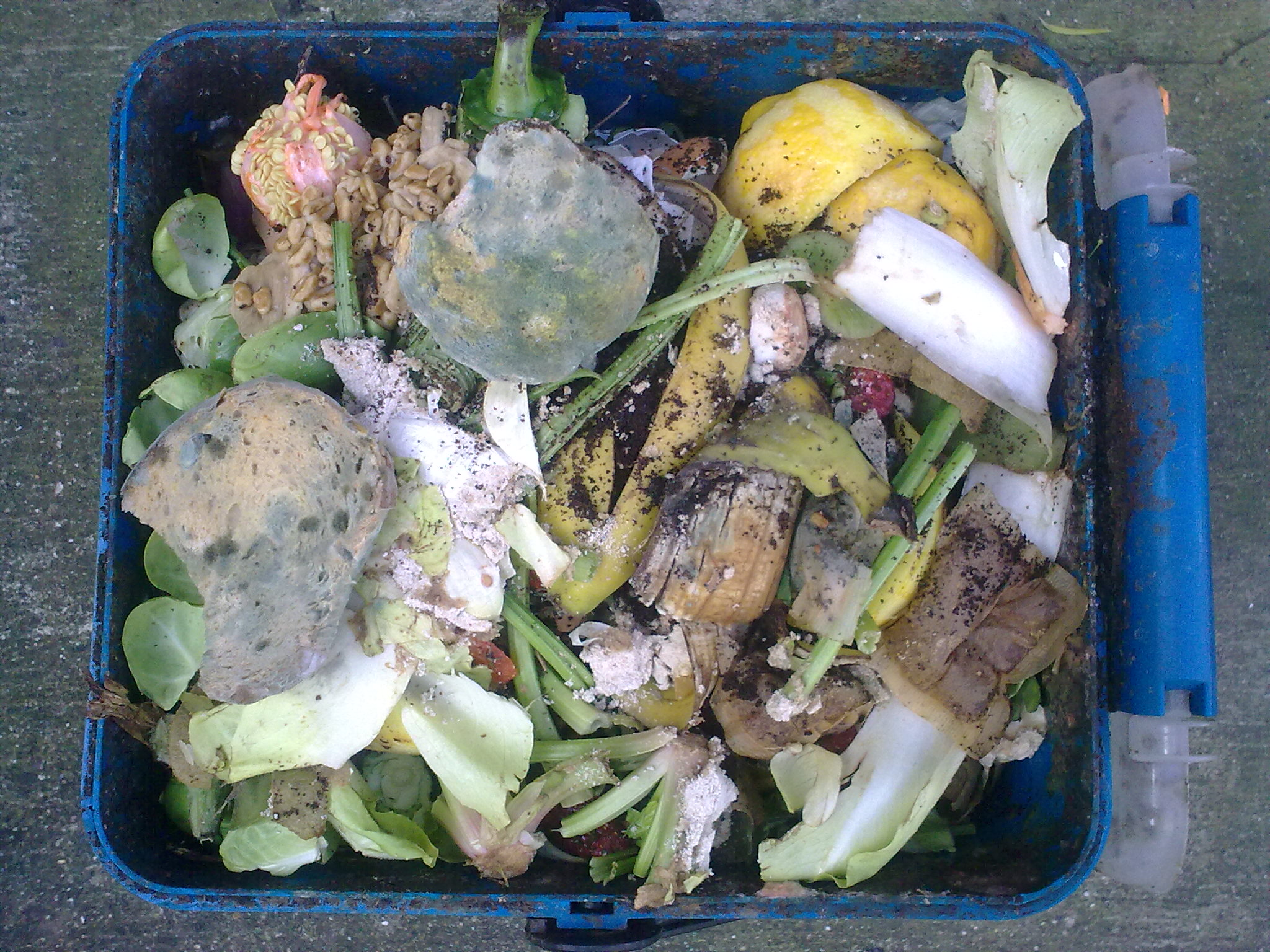
A container filled with mostly unavoidable food waste, like peels and cores, possibly useful for composting.

As of 2011, 1.3 billion tons of food, about one third of the global food production, are lost or wasted annually. The USDA estimates that 27% of food is lost annually. In developing and developed countries which operate either commercial or industrial agriculture, food waste can occur at most stages of the food industry and in significant amounts.

Packaging protects food from damage during its transportation from farms and factories via warehouses to retailing, as well as preserving its freshness upon arrival. Although it avoids considerable food waste, packaging can compromise efforts to reduce food waste in other ways, such as by contaminating waste that could be used for animal feedstocks.

Retail stores can throw away large quantities of food. Usually, this consists of items that have reached either their best before, sell-by or use-by dates. Food that passed the best before, and sell-by date, and even some food that passed the use-by date is still edible at the time of disposal, but stores have widely varying policies to handle the excess food. Some stores put effort into preventing access to poor or homeless people while others work with charitable organizations to distribute food.

Retailers also contribute to waste as a result of their contractual arrangements with suppliers. Failure to supply agreed quantities renders farmers or processors liable to have their contracts cancelled. As a consequence, they plan to produce more than actually required to meet the contract, to have a margin of error. Surplus production is often simply disposed of. Some grocery stores donate leftover food (for example, deli foods and bread past their expiration date) to homeless shelters or charity kitchens.

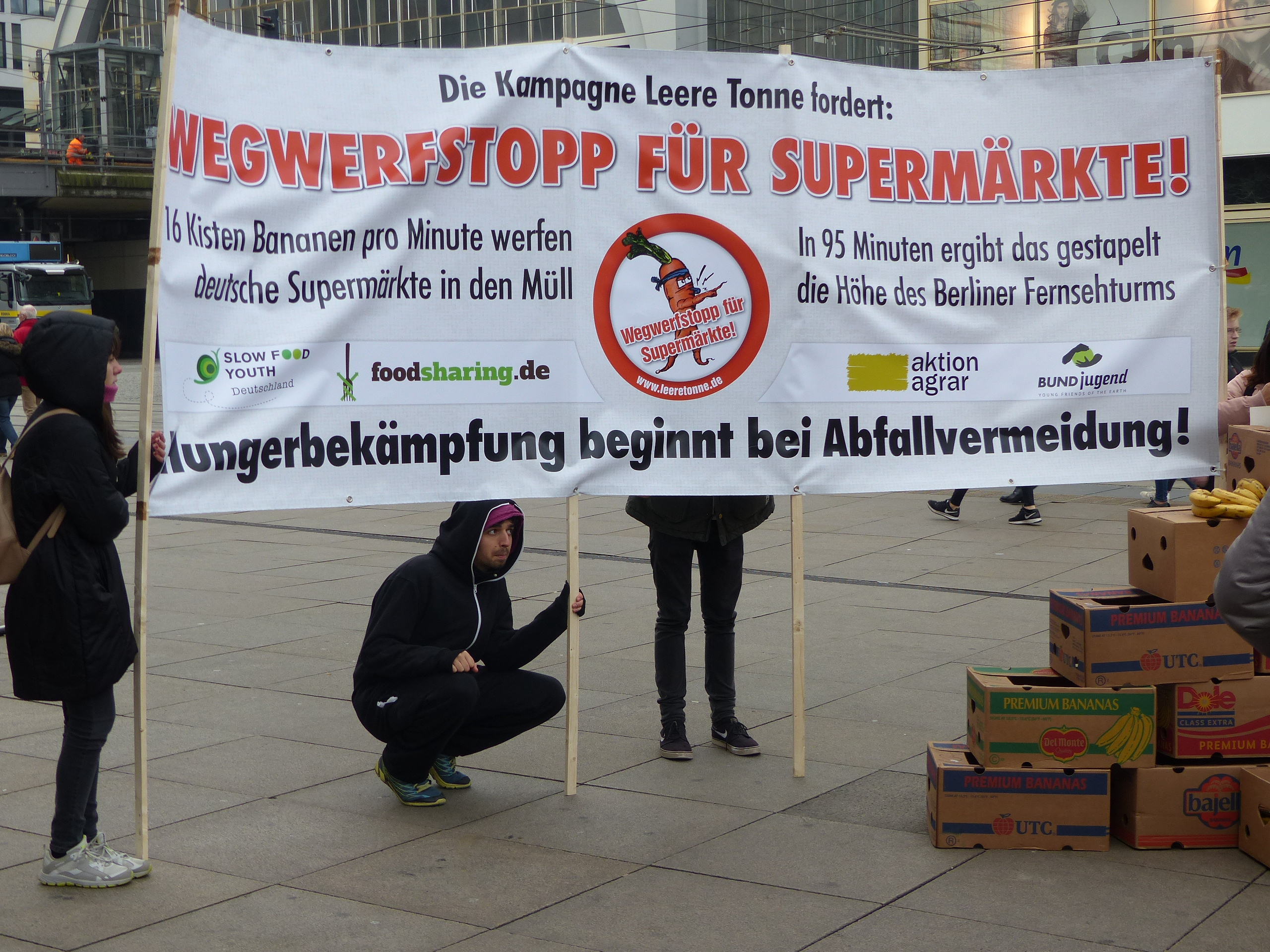
Protest against food waste, Berlin, Germany

The European Union claimed 2014 to be "Year Against Food Waste". The contracts that most retailers had signed required that food would be of a certain quality. With this recent socio-political change, food such as non-round tomatoes and apples with blemishes had a new market. Intermarche, France's third-largest supermarket launched its "inglorious fruits and vegetables" campaign in order to reduce waste. This, fruits and vegetables, waste reduction strategy has shown great promise towards this EU proposed campaign. These products are sold at a reduced price compared to the perfectionist campaign showing a 24% increase in sales. Fruta Feia a Portuguese retailer ran a similar business strategy with comparable success.

A 2021 analysis by the United Nations Environment Programme found that food waste was a challenge in all countries and economic levels, excluding food lost during production. This study estimated global food waste at 931 million tonnes (around 121 kg per person) across three sectors: households (61%), food service (26%), and retail (13%).

Food waste contributes significantly to agriculture's impact on climate change, responsible for 3.3 billion tons of CO_{2}e emissions annually, along with other environmental concerns like land use, water consumption, and biodiversity loss. Preventing food waste is a top priority, followed by surplus food reuse through methods like donations. Strategies then include animal feed, nutrient recycling, and energy recovery, with landfill being the least preferred due to methane emissions.

The UN's Sustainable Development Goal Target 12.3 aims to cut global per capita food waste by 50% at retail, consumer levels, and throughout production and supply chains, including post-harvest losses, by 2030. Climate change mitigation efforts emphasize reducing food waste, as demonstrated by the 2022 UN Biodiversity Conference's agreement among nations to achieve a 50% reduction in food waste by 2030.

== See also ==
- Big-box store
- Bulk foods
- Food cooperative
- General store
- List of grocers
- List of food cooperatives
- List of hypermarkets
- List of supermarket chains
- List of convenience stores
- List of superstores
- Public grocery store
- Self-service
- Vegetable box scheme
- Greengrocer
