= Soledad Saieh =

Chilean businesswoman, film producer and cultural manager

- Born: María Soledad Saieh Guzmán; 29 August 1972
- Died: 29 August 2017 (aged 45); Santiago, Chile
- Resting place: Parque del Recuerdo
- Education: Massachusetts Institute of Technology
- Occupations: Businesswoman, film producer, cultural manager
- Parents: Álvaro Saieh (father); Anita Guzmán (mother)

María Soledad Saieh Guzmán (29 August 1972 – 29 August 2017) was a Chilean businesswoman, film producer, and cultural manager.

== Biography ==
The daughter of businessman Álvaro Saieh and architect Anita Guzmán, Soledad Saieh was the second of five siblings. She studied commercial engineering at the Pontifical Catholic University of Chile and earned a Master of Business Administration from the Massachusetts Institute of Technology. In 2005 she completed postgraduate studies in arts and philanthropy at the Hayman Center for Philanthropy and Fundraising at New York University.

She began her career working in various executive positions in her father's companies, serving as director at Clínica Las Condes, executive president of the CorpVida group, and director of corporate social responsibility at CorpGroup Inmobiliaria.

In 2002 she co-founded the CorpArtes Foundation, devoting herself fully to cultural management and serving as its executive director for seven years. She was a partner at two film production companies, FunkyFilms and Demente Producciones, contributing to the development and commercialization of films such as Gritos del bosque (2014) and El hilo rojo (2016). She spearheaded the creation of the Santiago International Film Festival (where she acted as a patron for debuting directors such as filmmaker Pablo Larraín, whom she supported to finance and disseminate his film Fuga) and the Chile Arte Contemporáneo international art fair (Ch.ACO), which launched in 2009 in Santiago, along with gallery owners Irene Abujatum, Elodie Fulton, and Florencia Loewenthal. She was also a counselor at the Community Women's Institution, director of the ICARE Finance and Business Circle, and vice president and founder of the Chilean chapter of the National Museum of Women in the Arts.

In her role as philanthropist, together with other businesspeople, she donated funds to Desafío Levantemos Chile to rent a Lockheed C-130 Hercules tanker aircraft to fight the 2017 wildfires in the central-southern zone of Chile.

Soledad Saieh died on 29 August 2017, her 45th birthday, due to acute pulmonary edema that caused an infarction. She is buried in Santiago's Parque del Recuerdo.
