= Álvaro Saieh =

Chilean businessman

Álvaro Saieh Bendeck
- Born: 14 September 1949 (age 76); Villanueva, Colombia
- Education: Universidad de Chile, University of Chicago
- Occupation: Chairman
- Children: 5 (including Soledad Saieh)

Álvaro Saieh Bendeck (born 14 September 1949) is a Colombian academic, economist, and businessman. He is the chairman of CorpGroup, one of Chile's largest conglomerates.

As of 2018, Forbes listed him as the 729th wealthiest person in the world, and 4th in Chile. He is a trustee at the University of Chicago, his alma mater.

== Early life ==
Álvaro Saieh was born on 14 September 1949, in Villanueva, La Guajira, Colombia. Of Palestinian, Syrian, and Lebanese ancestry, A naturalized Chilean by descent, his parents are Chilean José Saieh and Colombian Elena Bendeck.

At the age of three, his family moved to Talca, Chile, where they started Casa Saieh, a family business that offered electrical appliances to clothing. In this city, he started his education, finishing high school at Liceo Abate Molina. At 17 years old, he moved to Santiago to pursue a degree in commercial engineering at Universidad de Chile, from which he graduated in 1972. In 1973, he started a postgraduate degree in Economics at the same university. Later, he attended The University of Chicago, where he pursued a master's degree in arts (1976) and a PhD in economics.

In his first years as a professional, he worked in the public sector, being an economic adviser for the Ministerio de Vivienda y Urbanismo and the Ministerio de Obras Públicas. He was also an economic adviser for the Banco Central de Chile and delegate of the Superintendencia de Bancos at Banco Continental.

== Business career ==
In the 1980s Álvaro Saieh started his business activity, acquiring – along with other investors of Arabic roots, including Carlos Abuhomor – the Banco Osorno y la Unión. During the 1990s he also acquired AFP Provida, currently one of the leading pension fund managers in Chile; then, during the same decade, he sold both companies to international groups.

=== CorpBanca ===
These first operations were followed by the acquisition, in 1995, of the Banco Concepción, a bank that presented a negative equity and an important subordinated debt to the State. In less than 10 years Saieh would transform it into Chile's fourth largest private bank, now known as Corpbanca.

This institution gradually grew up, entering the global market with operations in several countries of Latin America, such as Peru, Argentina and Colombia, and opening offices in Madrid and New York City. Within this process of growth, in 2011 CorpBanca made the largest investment of a Chilean company abroad, acquiring Banco Santander Colombia in an operation close to US$1.2 billion. Later, Saieh acquired Helm Bank, transforming CorpBanca Colombia into the fifth private bank of the country.

=== CorpGroup ===
In the following years Álvaro Saieh expanded his activities, creating CorpGroup, a conglomerate with investments in the financial, retail, real estate, hotel, and media business.

==== Itaú CorpBanca ====
In 2016 Corpbanca merged with the Brazilian bank Itaú. Currently the conglomerate is the fourth largest private bank in Chile, with a market share of around 8% and a stock market capitalization of approximately US$3.4 billion.

==== SMU ====
In 2007 the Saieh family purchased Unimarc supermarkets, entering the retail business. This marked the beginning of SMU, the third supermarket chain in Chile and the one with the largest national coverage. SMU operates with wholesale chains (Alvi and Mayorista 10), convenience stores (Ok Market), supermarkets (Unimarc), and a hardware chain (Construmart). SMU is also present in Peru, through Mayorsa supermarkets. Saieh resigned from his position as president of SMU in 2018.

==== VivoCorp ====
VivoCorp is the company that gathers all the real estate business of CorpGroup, with 70 stand-alone stores, 60 strip malls and 3 power centers. With 350,000 m2 between malls and outlet stores, its main assets are Mall Vivo San Fernando, Mall Vivo Los Trapenses, Panoramic Mall and El Centro Mall, in addition to the participation in Casa Costanera. VivoCorp also owns Maipú and Peñuelas outlet stores, in addition to the early opening of La Florida and Temuco outlet stores.

During 2017 two major projects are also expected to materialize: Mall Vivo Coquimbo and Mall Vivo Imperio, in addition to the construction of Mall Vivo Santiago.

==== Hyatt Hotels ====
In Chile, Hyatt counts with two hotels: Grand Hyatt Santiago and Hyatt Place Vitacura.

CorpGroup also owns 50% of stake in a partnership with the Mexican group City Express. Since 2016 this company owns its first hotel in Chile, the City Express Santiago Airport.

==== Companies ====
Some of the holding's companies that provide backoffice services to other enterprises of the group are: Aeronest SA, Corp Imagen y Diseño SA, Corp Research SA, CorpGroup Holding Ltda., Hotel Corporation of Chile SA, Inmobiliaria Edificio CorpGroup SA, CorpGroup Interhold SPA, Inversiones HSG SA and Punto H S.A.

== Foundations ==
Among the activities that Álvaro Saieh has developed with his family in recent years, is the creation of two foundations: Fundación CorpArtes and Fundación Descúbreme.

Founded in 2002 along with his daughter Soledad, Fundación CorpArtes' objective is to promote the arts and improve the access to it through transformative cultural experiences. In the last years, it has managed initiatives in the fields of literature, visual arts, theater, music, and film, including the organization of the International Film Festival of Santiago (SANFIC). In 2014 was inaugurated the Centro de las Artes 660, a cultural space that has a multipurpose theater room, a sculpture garden and three visual arts exhibit halls.

Fundación Descúbreme was created in 2010. Its mission is to promote the integral inclusion of people with cognitive disabilities. Born from the initiative of the Sociedad Educacional Colegio El Golf S.A. and Tacal, Mírame y Amigos por Siempre foundations, Fundación Descúbreme conducts awareness campaigns, job inclusion, and social projects.

== Publications ==
- International Economy and its impact on Chilean Economy. In Taller de Coyuntura, Department of Economics, Universidad de Chile. (1985).
- A note about money growth. In Revista de Economía, N° 33. (1985).
- Monetary and foreign trade situation. In Revista de Economía N° 26. (1984).
- Keynes: the political economist. In Revista Estudios de Economía N° 22. Department of Economics, Universidad de Chile. (1984).
- International Reserves demand and the discretionary credit policy in economies with fixed exchange rates. In Revista de Economía N° 23. Department of Economics, Universidad de Chile. (1984).
- What can we learn from the Chilean Experience 1973-1983. With L. Sjaastad in the 11th INTERLAKEN, Seminar of Analysis of Ideology. (1984).
- Renegotiation of the debt and its meaning. With H. Cheyre in Revista de Economía N° 12. (1983).
- Keynes: the political economist. In Revista de Economía N° 13. (1983).
- A comment about criticisms. With E. Haindl and G. Parot in Revista de Economía N° 17. (1983).
- About macroeconomic policy. In Revista de Economía N° 18. (1983).
- Prospects of world economy and its impact in Chile. With J. Selume in Revista de Economía N° 18. (1982).
- Behavior of monetary variables in economies with fixed exchange rates. CEMLA Monetaria. Vol. IV, N° 2. (1981).
- Economic policy, 1973-1979. With Jorge Cauas in Revista Realidad N° 5. (1980).
- The monetary approach of the exchange rate. In Cuadernos de la CEPAL (E/CEPAL/1088). (1979).
- Expectations of price and inflation: literature review. Department of Economics, Universidad de Chile. Publicación Docente N° 27. (1979).
- Investment and growth. Department of Economics, Universidad de Chile. (1979).
- An analysis about the possibility of assessing the creditworthiness of developing countries CEMLA Monetaria, Vol. II, N° 3. (1979).
- Diagnosis of the Chilean housing problem. In Colección Monografías y Ensayos N° 97. Technical Division of Research and Housing Development, Ministry of Housing and Urban Development. (1978).
- Alternative exchange systems in inflationary scenarios. PNUD/CEPAL. (1978).
- Funding system for housing in Chile. Documento de Investigación N° 16. Department of Economics, Universidad de Chile. (1977).
- Introduction to capital markets. Estudios Monetarios III, Central Bank of Chile. (1974).
- Proximate determinants of the amount of money. In Revista de Economía N° 2, Department of Economics, Universidad de Chile. (1974).
