= Unimarc =

Chilean Supermarket Chain

- Company Logo

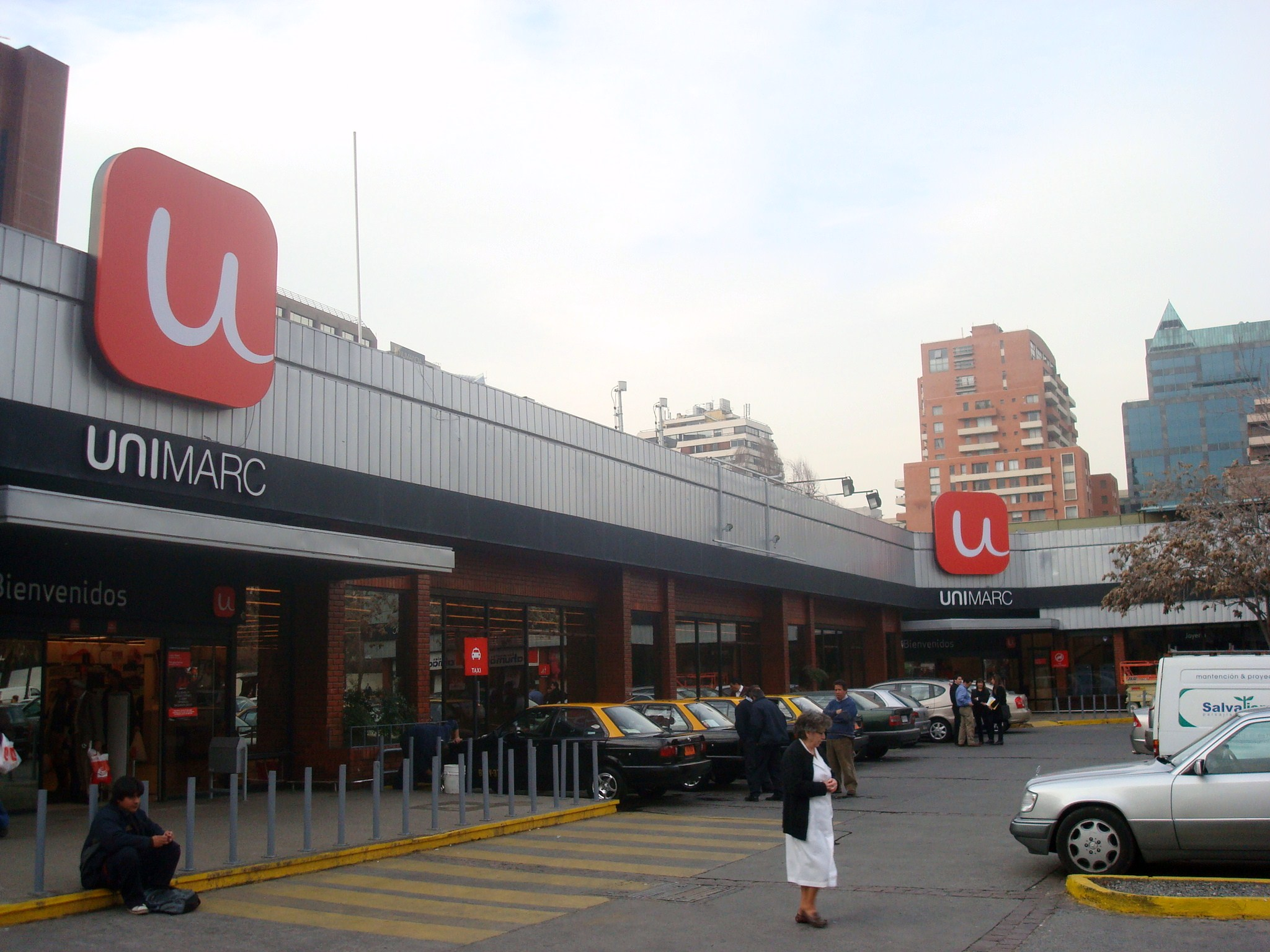
- Unimarc Supermarket in Providencia, Chile.
- Formation: May 1961
- Founded at: Santiago, Chile
- Type: Supermarket Chain
- Headquarters: 5680 Cerro el Plomo Avenue, Las Condes.
- Location: Chile
- Coordinates: 33°24′19″S 70°34′27″W
- Official language: Spanish
- Owner: SMU (Sociedad Supermercados SMU)
- Website: https://www.unimarc.cl
- Formerly called: Cooperativa de Consumidores Unidos, Unicoop, Unicrav.

Unimarc is a Chilean Supermarket Chain owned by the Chilean group SMU. As of 2025, it has nearly 300 locations across all 16 regions of Chile, making it the biggest supermarket in the country by location count.

== History ==
Unimarc (First Called Cooperativa de Consumidores Unidos) was founded in 1961 and was comprised by Sodimac Workers. After a name change to Unicoop, its statutes were approved in August 1961 by the Industry and Commerce Directive. Its first supermarket was located in the corner between the Alameda and Dieciocho avenues. After the 1970s economical crisis it was acquired by the Viña del Mar Sugar Refining Company (CRAV) and was renamed to Unicrav. After the bankruptcy of the companies of the Ross Group (Owner Of CRAV), Unicrav was acquired by Francisco Errázuriz and renamed to its current name of Unimarc in 1981. In 1991 Unimarc also started operations in Argentina, though in 1998 it retired from them, and its six stores in the country were divided between Supermercados Norte and Cencosud.

In May 2008, the company was acquired by Álvaro Saieh and annexed into other supermarket chains, creating the biggest in Chile. In 2011, SMU merged with Supermercados del Sur.
