= Eddie Campodónico =

Chilean footballer (born 1951)

Personal information
- Full name: Eddie Armando Campodónico Saluzzi
- Date of birth: 9 July 1951 (age 75)
- Place of birth: Iquique, Chile
- Height: 1.83 m (6 ft 0 in)
- Position: Defender

Youth career
- 1963–1969: Unión Pueblo Nuevo
- Olimpia
- 1969: Iquique (city team)
- 1969–1970: Universidad Católica

Senior career*
Years	Team	Apps	(Gls)
1970–1974	Universidad Católica		
1974–1975	O'Higgins		
1976–1979	Palestino		
1980	Deportes Iquique		
1981–1982	Palestino		
1982–1983	Durban City		
- * Club domestic league appearances and goals

Eddie Armando Campodónico Saluzzi (born 9 July 1951) is a Chilean former footballer who played as a defender.

== Career ==
Born in Iquique, Campodónico played for clubs in both Chile and South Africa. As a youth player, Campodónico was with Unión Pueblo Nuevo from his city of birth and Olimpia from Cerrillos while he was a student. Back in Iquique, he represented the city team in the 1969 national youth championship played in Arica. After being watched at that championship by René Reitich, an agent of Universidad Católica, he and his fellow Hugo Solís joined the club in May 1969. He made his professional debut in 1971 in a Chilean Primera División match versus Magallanes, playing as a centre forward. In the 1972 season, he turned into a left-back, making 33 appearances.

From 1974 to 1975 he played for O'Higgins, where he played in all defensive positions.

In 1976 he moved to Palestino and took part in the Copa Libertadores. He is a well remembered player of Palestino in the 1970s, a successful stint for the club, winning both the 1977 Copa Chile and the 1978 Primera División, coinciding with players such as Óscar Fabbiani and Elías Figueroa. He had another stint with the club from 1981 to 1982.

In 1980, he played for Deportes Iquique, winning the 1980 Copa Polla Gol.

In the 1982–83 season, he moved to South Africa and joined Durban City, thanks to Chilean coach Mario Tuane, coinciding with Chilean players such as Raúl González and Mario Varas in the South African football.

He graduated as a football manager and is a member of the Colegio de Técnicos de Chile (Association of Football Managers of Chile).

== Personal life ==
His parents were Luis Campodónico Bolt and Rosina Saluzzi Merenda, both of Italian descent, and his wife is Verónica Opazo Neumann.

His older brother Domingo also was a professional footballer, who was part of the first professional squad of Deportes Iquique as a goalkeeper.

== Honours ==
Palestino

- Primera División de Chile: 1978
- Copa Chile: 1977

Deportes Iquique

- Copa Polla Gol: 1980
