= Manuel Araya (footballer, born 1948) =

Chilean footballer (1947–2018)

- Araya on the cover of Estadio in 1978

Personal information
- Full name: Manuel Enrique Araya Díaz
- Date of birth: 8 May 1948
- Place of birth: Santiago, Chile
- Date of death: 4 July 1994 (aged 46)
- Place of death: Santiago, Chile
- Position: Goalkeeper

Youth career
- ???–1967: Colo-Colo

Senior career*
Years	Team	Apps	(Gls)
1968–1971	Colo-Colo	66	(0)
1972	Lota Schwager		
1973–1980	Palestino		
1981–1984	Naval		
1985	Palestino		

International career
1979	Chile	2	(0)
- * Club domestic league appearances and goals

Manuel Enrique Araya Díaz (8 May 1948 – 4 July 1994) was a Chilean footballer. Nicknamed "Loco", played for Colo-Colo throughout the early 1970s as well as with Palestino for most of his career as he earned several national titles with the two clubs as a goalkeeper. He also briefly represented his home country of Chile in 1979.

== Club career ==
Araya began his career within the youth sector of Colo-Colo before making his senior debut on 30 June 1968 in a match against Santiago Morning. He remained in the club from 1968 until 1971, playing in 66 matches in 4 seasons. He was part of the winning squad for the 1970 Primera División de Chile and subsequently play in the 1971 Copa Libertadores. Despite wanting to further his career with the club, differences with the coaches would impede a long-term career with the club. This resulted in him then playing for Lota Schwager in 1972, but that time was short-lived following an eight-game suspension following an ejection from a match.

He then played for Palestino in 1973 where he experienced his most successful seasons. He was part of the winning squads for the 1975 and 1977 Copa Chile and also the 1978 Primera División de Chile. These successes resulted in Araya playing in more editions of the Copa Libertadores including the 1976, 1978 and 1979 editions with the latter being notable as he set a currently unbroken record of maintaining clean play for 510 total minutes within the Copa Libertadores in 44 matches. As a part of this football dynasty, he played alongside other players such as Elías Figueroa, Óscar Fabbiani, Sergio Messen, Rodolfo Dubó and Manuel Rojas.

Following several years with Palestino, he would play for Naval beginning in 1981 and played alongside other players such as Jorge Aravena, Óscar Herrera, Marcelo Pacheco, Jorge Rodríguez and Juan Soto. Despite briefly playing for Aviación, he would play his final season with Palestino once more in 1985. He would play in the final of the 1985 Copa Chile against his old club of Colo-Colo but would end up losing. After retiring from professional football, he would play in a few brief amateur spells in Germany and the United States. He would also play futsal at several venues including the Teatro Caupolicán.

== International career ==
Araya briefly represented Chile on two occasions in 1979 with both of these being friendlies against Ecuador. Despite being selected by manager Luis Santibañez himself, his international career was brief due to not being allowed to keep sporting his long hair.

== Personal life ==
Known for having excellent reflexes and hands with good grip, he was known for having an exuberant, intelligent and alert personality, despite being noted as being relatively introverted outside of the field. This reputation would lead to Araya being recognized as being one of the best goalkeepers within the history of Chilean football. His life was noted with various highlights as he would sometimes sit on the crossbar of the goal to watch the rest game when he was bored. Another notable incident occurred in 1972 in where a match was delayed due to Araya peeling an orange and couldn't start until he had finished eating it. In 1994, he entered the Noche Alba in a straitjacket. Following several familial disputes including a divorce and Araya losing custody of his sons as they lived all the way in Como, Lombardy, he committed suicide on the night of 4 July 1994.
