= List of Chile international footballers =

The Chile national football team represents Chile in international association football since 1910. It is fielded by Football Federation of Chile (Spanish: Federación de Fútbol de Chile), the governing body of football in Chile, and competes as a member of CONMEBOL. Only players with 20 or more official caps are included in this list.

On 24 March 2016, Claudio Bravo became the first player to play 100 official matches for Chile. Since then, eight other players – Alexis Sánchez, Gonzalo Jara, Gary Medel, Mauricio Isla, Jean Beausejour, Arturo Vidal, Eduardo Vargas and Charles Aránguiz – have achieved this milestone, in that chronological order.

== List of players ==
Key
§	Player is active with Chile and has been called up to the squad within the last 12 months
**Bold**	Player is still active to be called-up

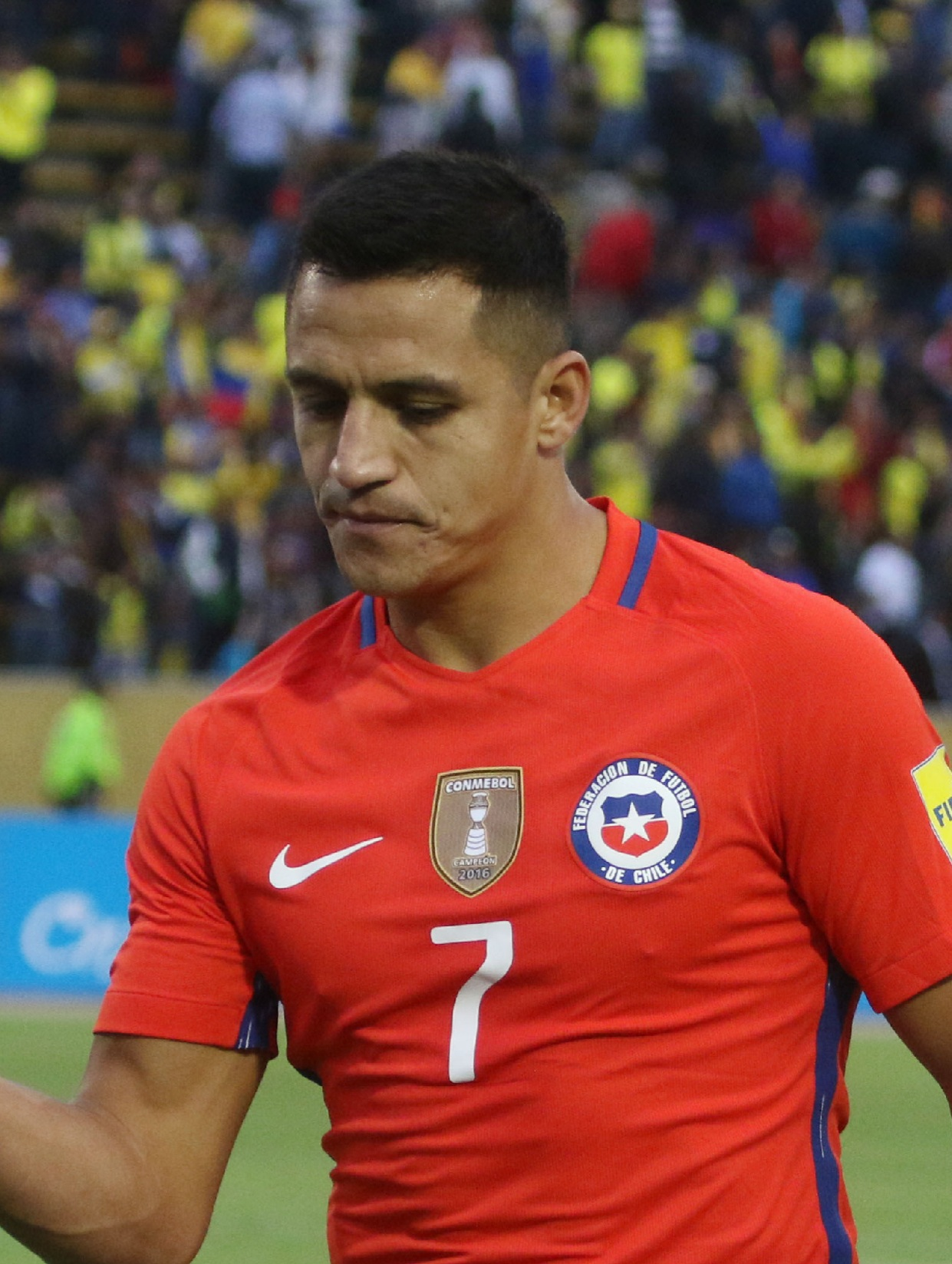
Alexis Sánchez (168 caps, 51 goals) is Chile's all-time most capped player and all-time leading goal scorer.

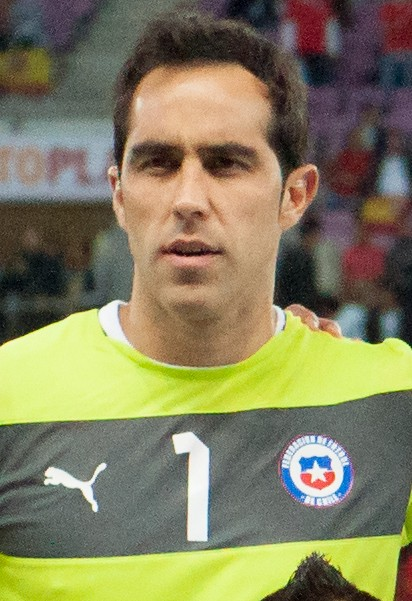
Claudio Bravo (150 caps, no goals) is the first player to earn 100 caps for Chile.

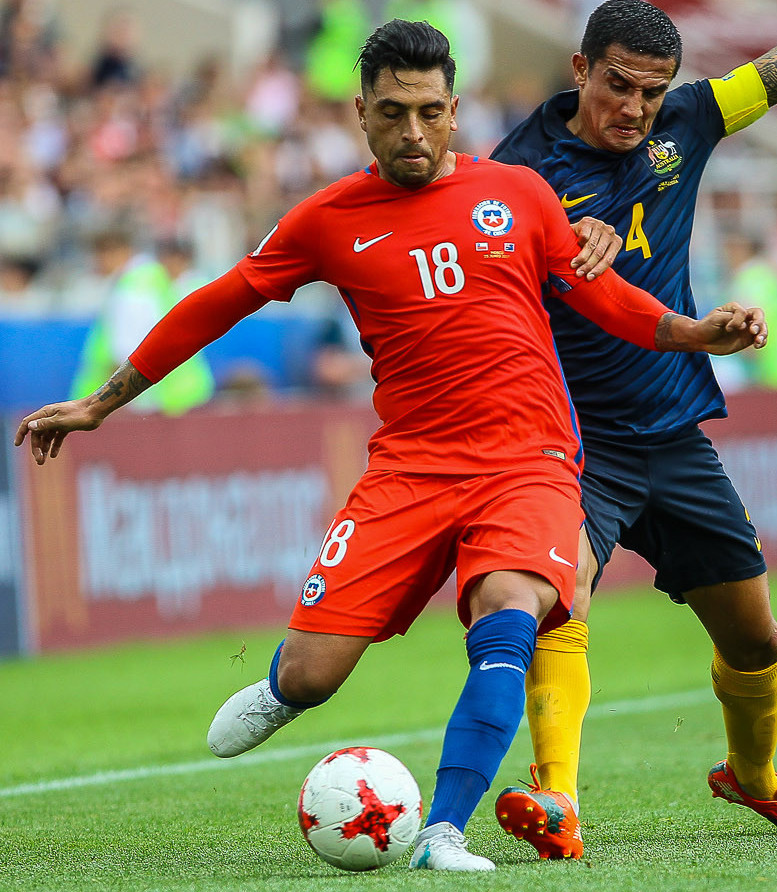
Gonzalo Jara (115 caps, 3 goals) is the third player to earn 100 caps for Chile after Alexis Sánchez.

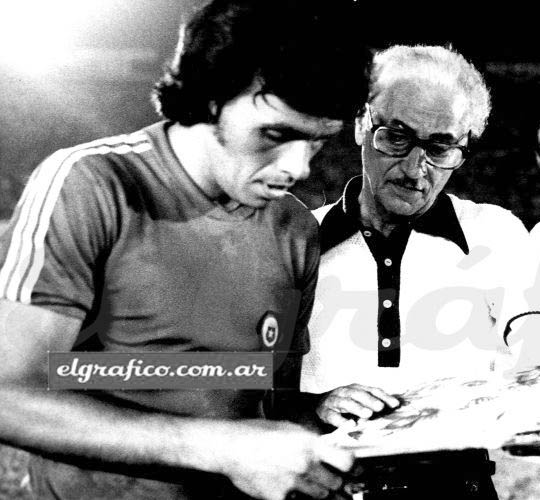
Elías Figueroa (47 caps, 3 goals) (left) was selected as the 37th-best World player of 20th century in an IFFHS poll.

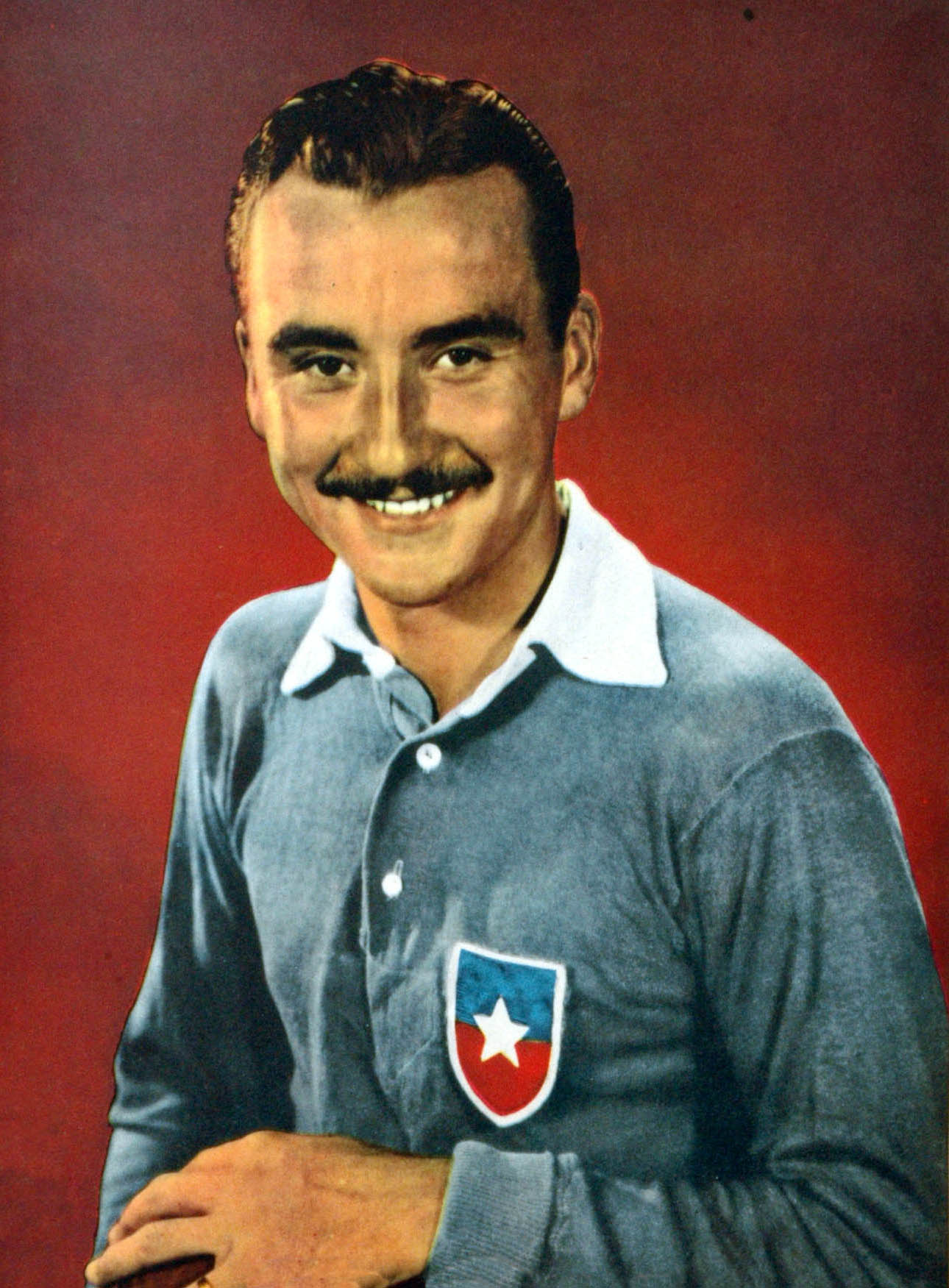
Serjio Livingstone (52 caps, no goals) was selected as the 8th-best South American keeper of 20th century in an IFFHS poll.

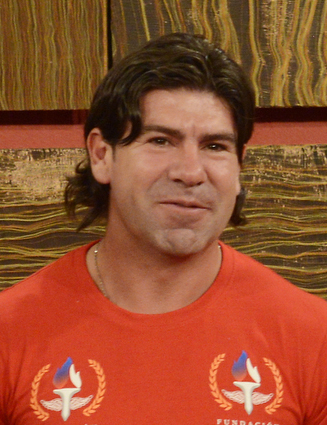
Marcelo Salas (70 caps, 37 goals) is the top goalscorer for Chile at the FIFA World Cup with 4 goals alongside Leonel Sánchez.

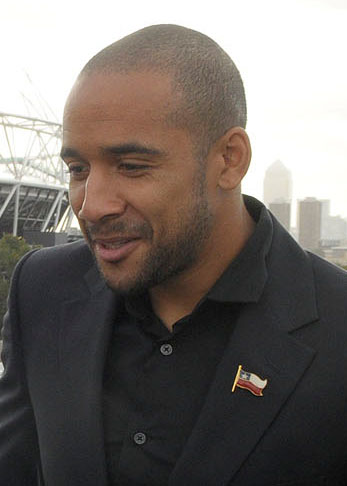
Jean Beausejour (109 caps, 6 goals) is the only Chilean player to score a goal in two FIFA World Cups.

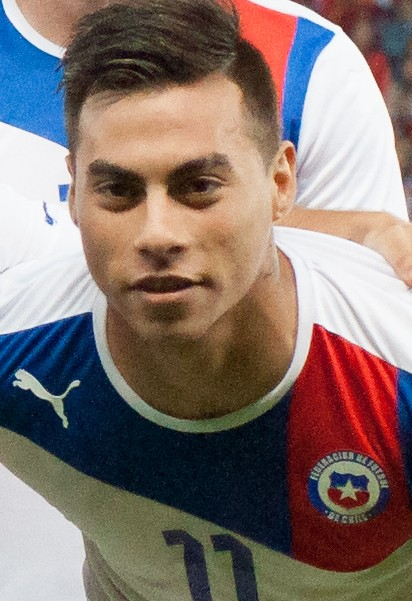
Eduardo Vargas (120 caps, 45 goals) is the top goalscorer for Chile at the Copa América with 14 goals.

Player	Caps	Goals	First cap	Last cap
**Alexis Sánchez**	168	51 (list)	2006	2025
**Gary Medel**	161	7	2007	2023
Claudio Bravo	150	0	2004	2024
**Arturo Vidal**	147	34	2007	2025
Mauricio Isla	145	5	2007	2024
**Eduardo Vargas**	120	45	2009	2025
Gonzalo Jara	115	3	2006	2019
Jean Beausejour	109	6	2004	2020
**Charles Aránguiz**	103	7	2009	2025
Leonel Sánchez	85	24	1955	1968
Jorge Valdivia	79	7	2004	2017
Matías Fernández	74	14	2005	2018
**Eugenio Mena**	73	3	2010	2024
Nelson Tapia	73	0	1994	2005
Alberto Fouillioux	71	12	1960	1972
Marcelo Salas	70	37	1994	2007
Iván Zamorano	69	34	1987	2001
Fabián Estay	69	5	1990	2001
Pablo Contreras	67	2	1999	2012
Javier Margas	63	6	1990	2000
**Guillermo Maripán**	62	2	2017	2026
**Marcelo Díaz**	62	1	2011	2025
Miguel Ramírez	62	1	1991	2003
Clarence Acuña	61	3	1995	2004
Humberto Suazo	60	21	2005	2013
**Paulo Díaz**	58	1	2015	2026
Juan Carlos Letelier	57	18	1979	1989
Mark González	56	6	2003	2016
José Pedro Fuenzalida	55	5	2008	2020
José Luis Sierra	54	8	1991	2000
**Erick Pulgar**	54	4	2015	2024
Pedro Reyes	54	4	1994	2001
Jaime Pizarro	53	4	1986	1993
Pedro Araya	52	12	1964	1971
Serjio Livingstone	52	0	1941	1954
Nelson Parraguez	52	0	1991	2001
Francisco Valdés	51	9	1962	1975
Carlos Carmona	50	1	2008	2017
Ronald Fuentes	50	1	1991	2000
Alberto Quintano	50	0	1967	1979
Carlos Caszely	49	29	1969	1985
Roberto Rojas	49	0	1983	1989
Esteban Valencia	48	4	1994	2001
Mario Soto	48	1	1975	1985
Elías Figueroa	47	3	1966	1982
Jaime Ramírez	46	10	1954	1966
Rodolfo Dubó	46	3	1977	1985
David Pizarro	46	2	1999	2015
Ricardo Rojas	46	1	1994	2006
**Gabriel Suazo**	46	0	2017	2026
René Valenzuela	46	0	1979	1988
**Ben Brereton Díaz**	45	10	2021	2026
Mauricio Pinilla	45	8	2003	2016
Miguel Ángel Neira	45	4	1976	1985
Ramiro Cortés	45	1	1952	1960
Fabián Orellana	44	2	2008	2021
Claudio Maldonado	44	1	2000	2010
Lizardo Garrido	44	0	1981	1991
Enrique Hormazábal	43	17	1950	1963
Patricio Yáñez	43	5	1979	1994
Esteban Paredes	42	12	2006	2018
Waldo Ponce	42	4	2006	2011
Adolfo Nef	42	0	1969	1977
Alejandro Hisis	41	2	1983	1989
Leonel Herrera	41	0	1971	1985
Reinaldo Navia	40	10	1999	2007
Misael Escuti	40	0	1953	1963
René Meléndez	39	10	1950	1960
Leonardo Véliz	39	2	1966	1981
Roberto Hodge	39	1	1964	1977
Luis Eyzaguirre	39	0	1959	1966
Francisco Silva	39	0	2007	2017
Osvaldo Hurtado	38	6	1983	1989
Jorge Vargas	38	0	1999	2007
Jorge Aravena	37	22	1983	1990
Rodrigo Millar	37	3	2002	2016
**Diego Valdés**	37	2	2015	2025
Humberto Cruz	37	0	1961	1970
Marcelo Ramírez	37	0	1993	2001
Hugo Rubio	36	12	1984	1991
Rodrigo Tello	36	3	2000	2010
Gabriel Mendoza	36	1	1991	1997
Mario Osbén	36	0	1979	1988
Rubén Marcos	35	8	1963	1969
Carlos Reinoso	35	5	1966	1977
Felipe Gutiérrez	35	4	2010	2017
Manuel Iturra	35	1	2005	2012
Héctor Puebla	35	1	1984	1990
Moisés Villarroel	35	1	1997	2005
Manuel Álvarez	35	0	1947	1956
**Marcelino Núñez**	34	5	2021	2026
**Rodrigo Echeverría**	34	1	2020	2026
Luis Jiménez	33	3	2004	2021
Armando Tobar	33	3	1959	1967
Fernando Cornejo	33	2	1991	2000
Marco Estrada	33	1	2007	2011
**Enzo Roco**	33	1	2012	2022
Juan Olivares	33	0	1965	1974
Raúl Sánchez	33	0	1959	1964
Roberto Cereceda	32	1	2006	2010
Antonio Arias	32	0	1968	1977
Rodrigo Pérez	32	0	1995	2005
Atilio Cremaschi	31	10	1945	1954
Jorge Robledo	31	8	1950	1957
Claudio Núñez	31	4	1996	2003
Sergio Navarro	31	0	1957	1962
Francisco Rojas	31	0	1995	2005
Rubén Espinoza	30	5	1983	1991
Pablo Hernández	30	3	2014	2019
Patricio Reyes	30	2	1983	1989
Ismael Fuentes	30	1	2004	2010
Rafael Olarra	30	1	1998	2006
Marcelo Vega	30	1	1991	1998
Eduardo Vilches	30	1	1990	1996
Carlos Contreras	30	0	1959	1966
Sergio Ahumada	29	6	1973	1977
Pedro González	29	5	1993	2000
Ignacio Prieto	29	3	1965	1977
Patricio Mardones	29	2	1985	1995
Mario Galindo	29	0	1972	1982
Alfonso Lara	29	0	1968	1975
Osvaldo Castro	28	7	1966	1977
**Darío Osorio**	28	3	2022	2026
Manuel Rojas	28	2	1977	1982
Luis Musrri	28	0	1991	1998
Julio Crisosto	27	11	1971	1977
Luis Fuentes	27	4	1998	2005
Marcos González	27	2	2002	2014
Sebastián Rozental	27	2	1995	2000
Mauricio Aros	27	0	1998	2004
Manuel Muñoz	26	8	1950	1956
Mario Moreno	26	5	1959	1964
Guillermo Yávar	26	2	1964	1974
Rodrigo Meléndez	26	1	2001	2007
Enzo Escobar	26	0	1976	1982
Juan Rodríguez	26	0	1968	1974
Honorino Landa	25	5	1961	1966
Milovan Mirosevic	25	3	2001	2011
Jorge Contreras	25	2	1983	1997
Mario Lepe	25	1	1985	1994
Isaac Carrasco	25	0	1954	1961
**Brayan Cortés**	25	0	2018	2025
Ivo Basay	24	6	1986	1997
Nicolás Castillo	24	4	2013	2019
Carlos Rivas	24	4	1975	1982
Jaime Vera	24	4	1986	1991
**Jean Meneses**	24	3	2019	2024
Cristián Castañeda	24	1	1994	1998
Gonzalo Fierro	24	1	2006	2015
Hugo González	24	1	1988	1993
José Rojas	24	1	2007	2015
Cristián Álvarez	24	0	2000	2014
Eduardo Bonvallet	24	0	1979	1982
Arturo Farías	24	0	1950	1954
Johnny Herrera	24	0	2002	2018
Jorge Toro	23	3	1959	1973
**Felipe Loyola**	23	2	2023	2026
Eladio Rojas	23	2	1959	1966
Óscar Herrera	23	1	1981	1988
Daniel Díaz	23	0	1969	1977
Rodrigo Barrera	22	5	1993	1998
José Fernández	22	5	1950	1957
Osvaldo Sáez	22	4	1946	1954
Pablo Galdames	22	2	1995	2001
Rodolfo Almeida	22	0	1954	1960
Marco Cornez	22	0	1983	1995
Luis Hormazábal	22	0	1984	1987
Juan Machuca	22	0	1972	1977
Gustavo Moscoso	21	4	1976	1982
**Sebastián Vegas**	21	2	2018	2025
Vladimir Bigorra	21	0	1974	1987
Leonel Contreras	21	0	1985	1989
Eduardo Gómez	21	0	1984	1987
Miguel Pinto	21	0	2006	2012
Hernán Rodríguez	21	0	1955	1961
Hugo Villanueva	21	0	1964	1967
**Víctor Dávila**	20	3	2018	2025
Edson Puch	20	2	2009	2017
Fabián Guevara	20	1	1991	1995
**Vicente Pizarro**	20	1	2023	2026
Juan Soto	20	1	1977	1988
Eduardo Herrera	20	0	1967	1973
Rafael González	20	0	1972	1976
**Francisco Sierralta**	20	0	2018	2026
Leopoldo Vallejos	20	0	1968	1977
Marco Villaseca	20	0	1999	2001

== See also ==
- Football in Chile
- Chile national football team records and statistics
- List of Chile national football team hat-tricks
