= Mario Varas =

Chilean footballer (born 1951)

Personal information
- Full name: Mario Hernán Varas Pinto
- Date of birth: 28 November 1951 (age 74)
- Place of birth: Copiapó, Chile
- Height: 1.69 m (5 ft 7 in)
- Position: Full-back

Youth career
- 1963–1968: Universidad Católica

Senior career*
Years	Team	Apps	(Gls)
1968–1969	Universidad Católica		
1970–1974	Unión Española		
1974–1983	Palestino		
1983	Moroka Swallows		
1984	AmaZulu		
1984–1986	Orlando Pirates		
1987	Moroka Swallows		
1988–1989	Orlando Pirates		
- * Club domestic league appearances and goals

Mario Hernán Varas Pinto (born 28 November 1951) is a Chilean former footballer who played as a full-back.

== Career ==
A full-back who played along both sidelines, Varas played for clubs in both Chile and South Africa. A product of Universidad Católica youth system, in Chile he also played for Unión Española and Palestino. He is a well remembered player of Palestino in the 1970s, a successful stint for the club, winning the 1978 Primera División, coinciding with players such as Oscar Fabbiani and Elías Figueroa. Previously, he had won the 1973 Primera División with Unión Española, becoming one of the two players, along with Raúl Cárcamo, who was champion with both colony teams.

In South Africa, he played for Moroka Swallows, AmaZulu and Orlando Pirates between 1983 and 1989. He had come to South Africa in 1983, when he joined Moroka Swallows where he coincided with the Chilean footballers Raúl González and Eddie Campodónico, thanks to Chilean coach Mario Tuane.

== Personal life ==
He was nicknamed Perro Varas (Dog Varas), due to his aggressiveness to mark the opponents.

== Honours ==
Unión Española

- Chilean Primera División: 1973

Palestino

- Chilean Primera División: 1978
- Copa Chile: 1975, 1977

Moroka Swallows

- Mainstay Cup: 1983

Orlando Pirates

- Bob Save Super Bowl: 1988
