= Remigio Avendaño =

Chilean footballer (died 2009)

Personal information
- Full name: Remigio Fernando Avendaño Caro
- Place of birth: Santiago, Chile
- Date of death: 2009
- Place of death: Chile
- Position: Right-back

Youth career
- Unión Española

Senior career*
Years	Team	Apps	(Gls)
1962–1975	Unión Española	365	(11)
1967	→ 31 de Octubre (loan)		
1975	Jorge Wilstermann		
1976–1977	Audax Italiano	22	(0)
- * Club domestic league appearances and goals

Remigio Fernando Avendaño Caro (unknown – 2009) was a Chilean football player who played as a right-back for clubs in Chile and Bolivia.

== Career ==
A right-back from the Unión Española youth system, Avendaño became the team captain at the youth ranks. A historical player of Unión Española, he made appearances for them between 1962 and 1974 in the Chilean top division, winning the 1973 league title. At international level, he took part in four editions of the Copa Libertadores: 1971, 1973, 1974 and 1975, becoming the runner-up. In addition, he was a member of the squad in the 1970 Copa Ganadores de Copa, despite the fact that he was suspended. He also had a brief stint with Bolivian club 31 de Octubre in the 1967 Copa Libertadores.

As an anecdote, Avendaño and other players such as Hugo Berly, Juan Olivares, Mario Varas, Alberto Fouillioux, among others, were members of the Unión Española squad that went to Zambia and faced Kabwe Warriors and the Zambia national team, twice, in July 1972, in the context of a cooperation agreement with the FAZ. Unión Española became the first Chilean club to face African teams in Africa and the first South American club to play in Zambia.

In 1975, he moved to Bolivia and played for Jorge Wilstermann, coinciding with his compatriots José Acevedo, who was a teammate in Unión Española, and Víctor Villalón, who naturalized Bolivian.

The next season, he returned to Chile to play for Audax Italiano in the second level, getting promotion to the top division by minileague. He retired after playing for them in 1977.

== Personal life ==
As a football player, he was nicknamed Chacha.

He grew up in Juan Antonio Ríos neighbourhood, Santiago, just like other players such as Francisco Valdés and Hugo Berly.

He had a sister, María, a brother, José Miguel, and a half-sister from his mother, Vilma.

He died in 2009.
