= Mario Tuane =

Chilean footballer manager (1927–2017)

Personal information
- Full name: Mario Jorge Tuane Escaff
- Date of birth: 27 July 1927
- Place of birth: Santiago, Chile
- Date of death: 13 August 2017 (aged 90)
- Place of death: Viña del Mar, Chile

Senior career*
Years	Team	Apps	(Gls)
1947	Green Cross		

Managerial career
- Doxa Drama
- 1964–1965: Hellenic
- 1966: Olympia
- 1966–1967: GSC Corinthians
- 1967: Powerlines
- 1968: Doxa Drama
- 1969–1970: Powerlines
- 1971–1972: Berea Park
- 1973: Highlands Park
- 1973–1974: Black XI
- 1974: Benoni United
- 1974–1977: Moroka Swallows
- 1976: Lusitano
- 1977–1979: Orlando Pirates
- 1979–1980: Kaizer Chiefs
- 1980: Peñarol
- 1981: Palestino
- 1983–1984: Moroka Swallows
- 1984: AmaZulu
- 1984–1985: Moroka Swallows
- 1988: Giant Blackpool
- 1988–1989: Mamelodi Sundowns
- 1990–1992: Vaal Professionals
- 1999: African Wanderers
- * Club domestic league appearances and goals

Mario Jorge Tuane Escaff (27 July 1927 – 13 August 2017), sometimes referred as Mario Tuani, was a Chilean football player and manager.

== Career ==
As a football player, Tuane played for Green Cross for a season.

He came to South Africa after having coached Doxa Drama in Greece, where he arrived from Chile following the World War II. He mainly worked in South Africa for some 30 years, where he held the distinction of coaching Kaizer Chiefs‚ Mamelodi Sundowns‚ Moroka Swallows and Orlando Pirates. His record shows two league titles: First the 1979 National Professional Soccer League with Kaizer Chiefs and then the 1988 National Soccer League with Mamelodi Sundowns. In addition, he won the Mainstay Cup with Kaizer Chiefs in 1979 and Moroka Swallows in 1983.

In 1980 he coached Peñarol in Uruguay for some months, where he took with him the South African players Shaka Ngcobo and Ace Knomo, in addition to the Ghanaian player John Nketia Yawson. It was said he had been signed due to his ability to understand African players.

In 1981 he returned to Chile and joined Palestino. As manager of Palestino, he promoted the signing of two South African players in Chilean football. While the goalkeeper David Waterson played for Magallanes, Rodney Anley played for Palestino and scored a goal what allowed the club not be relegate to the second division.

Back in South Africa in 1983, he joined Moroka Swallows and took with him Chilean players Raúl González, Eddie Campodónico and Mario Varas. From his friendship with González, it was said that Tuane promoted the joining of Mark González, the son of Rául who was born in South Africa, to the Universidad Católica youth ranks.

The last club that he coached was African Wanderers in 1999, with Raúl González as his assistant.

== Personal life ==
He was nicknamed El Padrino (The Godfather) and also had passion for the equestrianism.

His wife was Greek. After his retirement, he made his home in Viña del Mar, Chile.

== Honours ==
Kaizer Chiefs

- National Professional Soccer League: 1979
- Mainstay Cup: 1979

Moroka Swalowws

- Mainstay Cup: 1983

Mamelodi Sundowns

- National Soccer League: 1988
