= Carlos Hoffmann =

Chilean footballer (1936–2013)

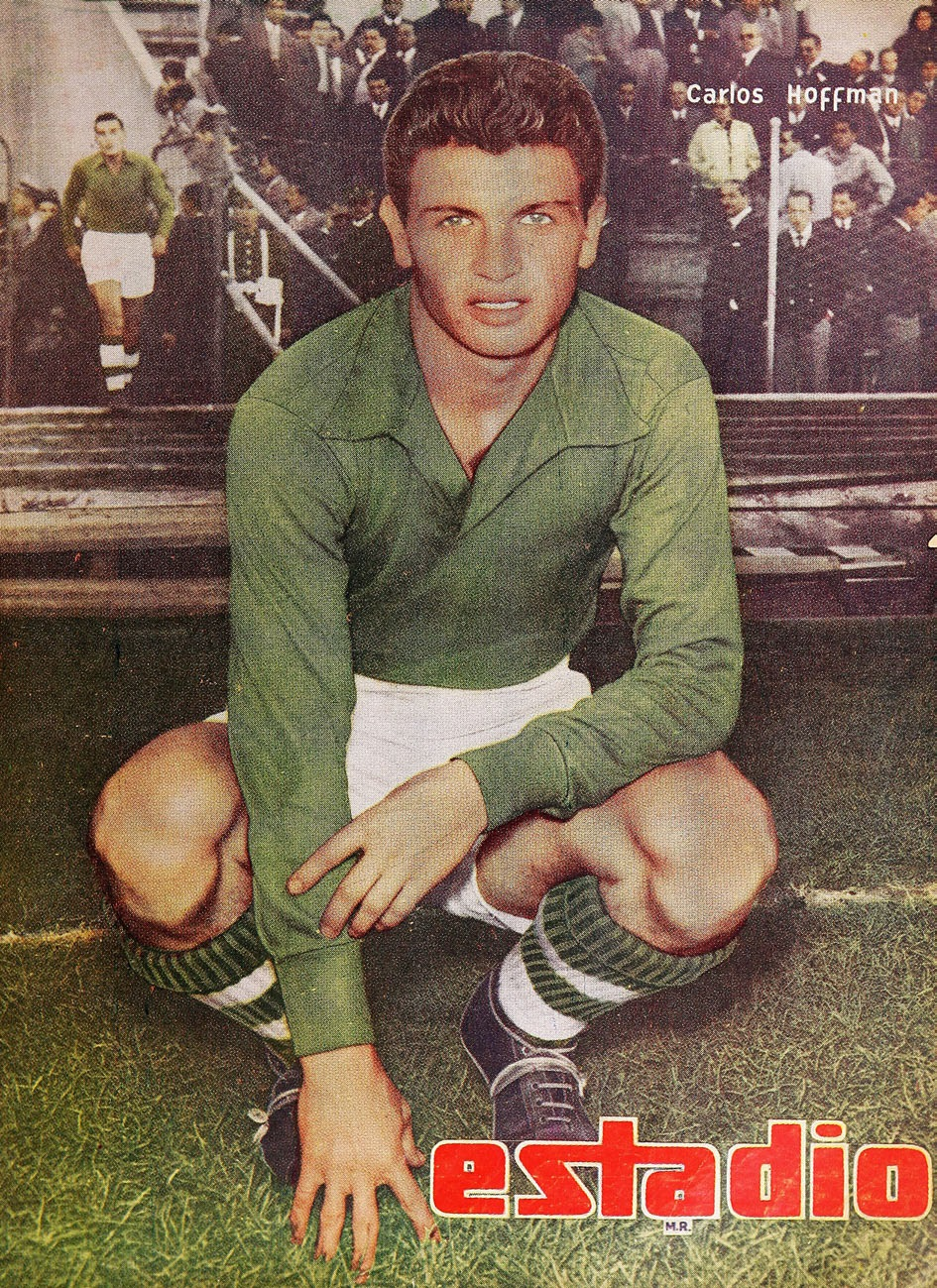

Personal information
- Full name: Carlos Jaime Hoffmann Vargas
- Date of birth: 5 May 1936
- Place of birth: Valparaíso, Chile
- Date of death: 4 June 2013 (aged 77)
- Place of death: Concepción, Chile
- Position: Midfielder

Youth career
- Santa Elena
- Santiago Wanderers

Senior career*
Years	Team	Apps	(Gls)
1955–1964	Santiago Wanderers		
1965–1967	Green Cross Temuco		
1968–1969	Deportes Concepción		
1970	Naval		

International career
1959–1965	Chile	8	(0)

Managerial career
- 1981: Deportes Concepción
- * Club domestic league appearances and goals

Carlos Jaime Hoffmann Vargas (5 May 1936 – 4 June 2013) was a Chilean footballer. He played in ten matches for the Chile national football team from 1959 to 1965, eight of which were A-class matches. He was also part of Chile's squad for the 1959 South American Championship that took place in Argentina.

== Personal life ==
His younger brother, Reynaldo, was also a Chile international footballer. In addition, his nephews, Reinaldo and Alejandro, both sons of Reynaldo, were professional footballers. From his niece Lorena, who married the Chilean former international footballer Raúl González, he was the great-uncle of her sons Mark González, a former Chile international footballer, and Raúl Hoffmann, an actor and football agent.

== Honours ==
Santiago Wanderers

- Chilean Primera División (1): 1958
- Copa Chile (2): 1959, 1961
