= Atahualpa Olympic Stadium =

Multi-purpose stadium in Quito, Ecuador

Estadio Olímpico Atahualpa
- El Coloso del Batán
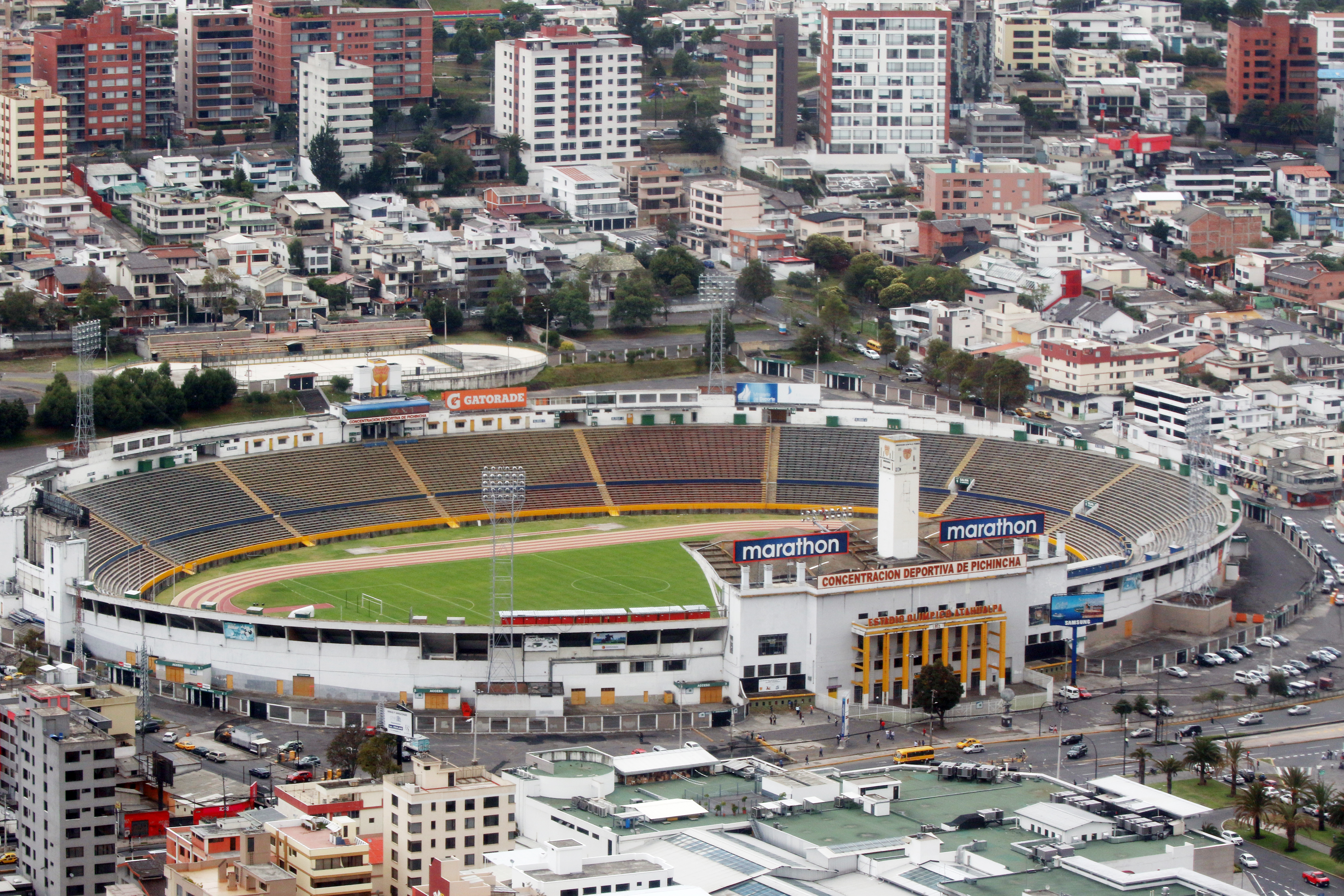
- Interactive map of Estadio Olímpico Atahualpa
- Location: Quito, Ecuador
- Coordinates: 0°10′39″S 78°28′36″W
- Owner: Concentración Deportiva de Pichincha
- Operator: Concentración Deportiva de Pichincha
- Capacity: 35,258
- Surface: Grass
- Field size: 105 x 70 m

Construction
- Groundbreaking: May 1948
- Built: 1948–1951
- Opened: November 25, 1951
- Expanded: 1977
- Project manager: Menatlas Quito C.A.

Tenants
- Ecuador national football team (1951–2020); América de Quito; Deportivo Quito; Universidad Católica (1963–present); El Nacional (1964–present)

Atahualpa Olympic Stadium (Spanish: Estadio Olímpico Atahualpa, [es'taðio o'limpiko ataˈwalpa]) is a multi-purpose stadium in Quito, Ecuador. It is currently used primarily for football matches and has a capacity of 35,258.

== Overview ==
Built in 1951, it sits at the intersection of the Avenida 6 de Diciembre and Avenida Naciones Unidas, two major streets in Ecuador's capital city. Football clubs Deportivo Quito, El Nacional and Universidad Católica use the facility for their home games, although other prominent teams in the city have used the stadium for home games in the past. The stadium is named after the Inca Emperor Atahualpa. The stadium is located at an elevation of 2,782 metres (9,127 ft).

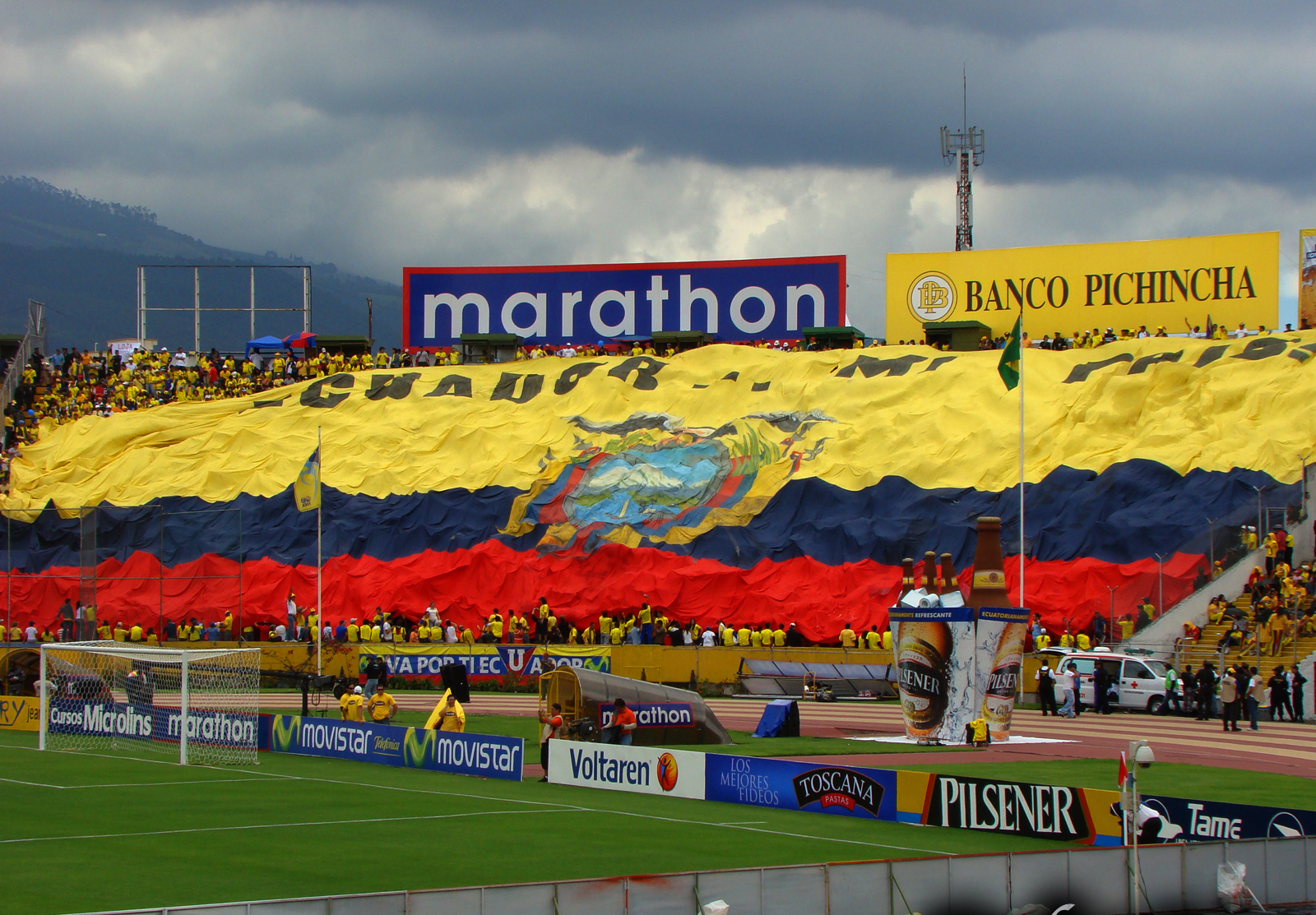
Atahualpa Stadium during a match between Ecuador and Brazil in March 2009.

At this venue, the Ecuador national team has defeated Brazil twice, Paraguay three times, and Argentina twice, amongst others, securing their positions at the 2002, 2006, and 2014 World Cups. During the 2006 and 2014 World Cup qualifiers, Ecuador were undefeated at this stadium. This record was broken by Brazil in the 2018 World Cup qualification by 3–0 at the stadium.

The current structure was set to be demolished in late 2020 to make way for a new, more modern venue, but as of March 2025, that has not happened, and the stadium continues to host sporting events.
