= 1978 Campeonato Nacional Segunda División =

Segunda División
- Season: 1978
- Champions: Santiago Wanderers
- Promoted: Santiago Wanderers; Naval
- Relegated: None

The 1978 Segunda División de Chile was the 27th season of the Segunda División de Chile.

Santiago Wanderers was the tournament's champion.

== Table ==
Pos	Team	Pld	W	D	L	GF	GA	GD	Pts	Promotion or qualification
1	Santiago Wanderers (C)	36	17	15	4	48	27	+21	49	Champions. Promoted to 1978 Primera División de Chile
2	Naval (P)	36	18	11	7	62	39	+23	47	Promoted to 1978 Primera División de Chile
3	Deportes Ovalle	36	18	10	8	65	38	+27	46	1977 Primera División de Chile promotion/relegation playoffs
4	Magallanes	36	16	14	6	47	34	+13	46	1977 Primera División de Chile promotion/relegation playoffs
5	Regional Antofagasta	36	15	15	6	43	35	+8	45	
6	Deportes La Serena	36	16	10	10	59	44	+15	42	
7	Trasandino	36	15	11	10	51	41	+10	41	
8	Ferroviarios	36	14	12	10	57	55	+2	40	
9	San Antonio Unido	36	11	14	11	51	49	+2	36	
10	Malleco Unido	36	13	9	14	46	43	+3	35	
11	San Marcos de Arica	36	13	9	14	44	45	−1	35	
12	San Luis de Quillota	36	10	11	15	44	54	−10	31	
13	Independiente de Cauquenes	36	12	6	18	53	60	−7	30	
14	Deportes Colchagua	36	10	10	16	40	53	−13	30	
15	Linares Unido	36	9	12	15	40	55	−15	30	
16	Unión La Calera	36	9	11	16	50	61	−11	29	
17	Unión San Felipe	36	7	15	14	49	65	−16	29	
18	Curicó Unido	36	7	10	19	35	52	−17	24	
19	Iberia	36	5	9	22	36	70	−34	19	

Source: rsssf.com
(C) Champions; (P) Promoted

== See also ==
- Chilean football league system
