= Juan Olivares =

Chilean footballer (born 1941)

Personal information
- Full name: Juan Segundo Olivares Marambio
- Date of birth: February 20, 1941 (age 85)
- Place of birth: Viña del Mar, Chile
- Height: 1.72 m (5 ft 8 in)
- Position: Goalkeeper

Youth career
- Estrella Naciente

Senior career*
Years	Team	Apps	(Gls)
1959–1969	Santiago Wanderers	252	(0)
1970–1973	Unión Española	70	(0)
1972	→ Unión San Felipe (loan)	–	(–)
1974	Magallanes	28	(0)
1975	Deportes La Serena	28	(0)
1976	Deportes Concepción	30	(0)
1977	Cobreloa		
1978	Santiago Wanderers		
1979–1980	Huachipato		
1981	Trasandino		
1982–1983	Santiago Wanderers		

International career
1965–1974	Chile	33	(0)
- * Club domestic league appearances and goals

Juan Segundo Olivares Marambio (born February 20, 1941) is a Chilean former football goalkeeper.

== Career ==
At club level, Olivares played for Santiago Wanderers, Magallanes, Cobreloa, Unión Española, among others. At international level, Olivares played for the Chile national team between 1965 and 1974, gaining 33 caps. He was part of the Chile squad for the 1966 and 1974 world cups.

As an anecdote, Olivares and other players such as Hugo Berly, Remigio Avendaño, Mario Varas, Alberto Fouillioux, among others, were members of the Unión Española squad that went to Zambia and faced Kabwe Warriors and the Zambia national team, twice, in July 1972, in the context of a cooperation agreement with the FAZ. Unión Española became the first Chilean club to face African teams in Africa and the first South American club to play in Zambia.
