= John Restrepo =

Colombian footballer (born 1977)

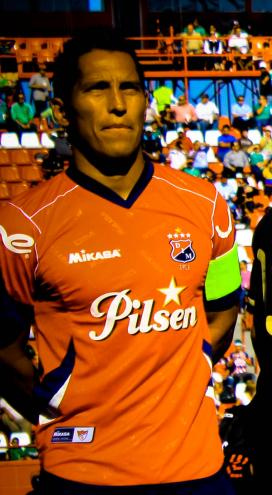
- Restrepo in 2011.

Personal information
- Full name: John Javier Restrepo
- Date of birth: August 22, 1977 (age 49)
- Place of birth: Medellín, Colombia
- Height: 1.71 m (5 ft 7 1/2 in)
- Position: Midfielder

Youth career
- Atlético Bucaramanga

Senior career*
Years	Team	Apps	(Gls)
1998	Atlético Bucaramanga		
1999–2003	Independiente Medellín	149	(3)
2003–2006	Cruz Azul	87	(8)
2006–2007	Tigres	32	(1)
2007–2008	Tiburones Rojos de Veracruz	31	(2)
2008–2012	Independiente Medellín	131	(3)
2012–2013	Itagüí Ditaires	64	(0)
2014	Águilas Pereira	36	(0)
2014–2017	Celaya	35	(1)
2017	Rionegro Águilas	28	(0)

International career
2001–2010	Colombia	38	(2)
- * Club domestic league appearances and goals as of 7 January 2017

John Javier Restrepo (born August 22, 1977) is a former football midfielder who played for the Colombia national football team between 2001 and 2010, winning the Copa América in 2001. He last played for Rionegro Águilas before retirement.

He returned to play for his old club Deportivo Independiente Medellín, after leaving Tigres in Mexico. His past clubs include Atlético Bucaramanga in Colombia and Cruz Azul in Mexico.

== Career statistics ==
=== International ===
Appearances and goals by national team and year
National team	Year	Apps	Goals
Colombia	2001	7	0
Colombia	2002	4	0
Colombia	2003	7	0
Colombia	2004	5	1
Colombia	2005	10	1
Colombia	2010	5	0
Total		38	2

Scores and results list Colombia's goal tally first, score column indicates score after each Restrepo goal.

List of international goals scored by John Restrepo
No.	Date	Venue	Opponent	Score	Result	Competition	Ref.
1	6 June 2004	Estadio Metropolitano Roberto Meléndez, Barranquilla, Colombia	Uruguay	4–0	5–0	2006 FIFA World Cup qualification	
2	4 June 2005	Estadio Metropolitano Roberto Meléndez, Barranquilla, Colombia	Peru	4–0	5–0	2006 FIFA World Cup qualification	

== Honours ==
Independiente Medellín

- Categoría Primera A: 2002-II, 2009-II

Colombia national football team

- Copa América: 2001
