= ChangeFIFA =

Soccer fan campaign organization

- Formation: June 2010
- Region served: Worldwide
- Leader: David Larkin, Oliver Fowler
- Website: http://changefifa.org/

ChangeFIFA was a campaign organisation, established in 2010 with the stated aim of making FIFA, the ruling body of world soccer, more "fair and accountable".

== Creation ==
The organisation was created in June 2010 by English fan Oliver Fowler, a self-described "freelancer" and "football businessman". It claimed to be a strictly self-funded campaign. ChangeFIFA was run by Fowler and David Larkin, an American attorney based in Washington, DC.

== Objectives ==
Oliver Fowler has outlined ChangeFIFA's objectives many times, in various articles. The organisation's stated objectives are to make FIFA "an organisation with a President and board voted in by the people who play, watch and love the game", and in more detail:

- To allow all football fans to be members of FIFA
- To give these fans, as FIFA members, the right to vote for the seat of FIFA president, and
- To allow any FIFA member to be a FIFA presidential candidate

== Action plan ==
ChangeFIFA's stated plan for reform is as follows:

- An independent commission will lead an inquiry into FIFA, to ensure all FIFA proceedings become "transparent and open to the public".
- On "major decisions affecting the international game", particularly the award of the hosting of the World Cup to member associations (a decision currently being made by the 24-man FIFA executive committee), all 208 FIFA member football associations would be voting.
- Every decision, vote and action taken on international football would be openly communicated to the public.
- Membership in the FIFA executive committee will be limited to fixed terms, and the president will not to serve more than two terms of office, overall.
- FIFA's finances are to be published in detail, including all sources of funding and the salary packages of all its staff.

== Methods ==
ChangeFIFA is strictly a pressure group. Its aims, per the organisation's charter, are to be achieved through lobbying and, if possible, negotiations with the world soccer's ruling body itself. They work through petition applications, lobbying, appearances in the media, and social networking.

== Support ==
Joining forces with Change FIFA, Damian Collins, Conservative Member of Parliament for Folkestone and Hythe and member of the House of Commons' Culture, Media and Sport Committee, has called for Sepp Blatter's re‑election as FIFA president to be suspended and a "reform agenda" to be introduced at football's ruling organisation. The British MP called on "members of parliaments and national assemblies" around the world to help reform FIFA by applying political pressure on the organisation.

The agenda calls for an independent commission to lead an inquiry into FIFA and then ensure that the organisation's proceedings become transparent and open to the public; that all FIFA member-associations be allowed to vote on "major decisions" (instead of these decisions being made by FIFA's 24-person Executive Committee); that all FIFA decisions, votes and actions be open to the public; and that FIFA's finances, in detail, become public. The agenda also calls for the FIFA president not to serve more than two terms of office.

== FIFA presidential elections ==
On 29 March 2011, ChangeFIFA endorsed former Chilean defender and for 3 years running South American Footballer of the Year Elias Figueroa for the FIFA presidency in the 2011 elections and urged FIFA's member-associations to back Figueroa, who needed to be nominated by a national football federation. However, on 31 March 2011, Figueroa announced he had decided not to accept his nomination as candidate, because "in such a short period of time I could not develop a case worthy of the magnitude and importance of such a distinguished job". In the 2011 elections, incumbent Sepp Blatter, who has been FIFA president for 13 years, won a mandate for another 4-year term, by a margin of 172 votes to 17, with 17 abstaining.

On 2 June 2015, Sepp Blatter resigned as president of FIFA in the wake of corruption indictments of FIFA officials.
