= List of Chile national football team hat-tricks =

This page is a list of hat-tricks scored by the Chile national football team. Since Chile's first international game on 27 May 1910 against Argentina, there have been 20 recorded hat-tricks, with the first being scored by David Arellano against Bolivia during the 1926 South American Championship. The most goals scored in a single match is 5, achieved by Iván Zamorano against Venezuela during 1998 FIFA World Cup qualification.

The record for the most hat-tricks scored for the Chile national team is two, with the record jointly being held by David Arellano and Marcelo Salas. The team which Chile have scored the most hat-tricks against is Paraguay, scoring 4 different hat-tricks against them.

Chile have conceded 24 hat-tricks in total, with Argentina and Brazil scoring eight each. Manuel Seoane holds the record for most hat-tricks scored against Chile, scoring two during the early 1920s. The most goals scored in a single game is 4, a record jointly held by three players, most recently achieved by Luis Suárez in 2011. The most notable hat-trick scored against Chile was scored by Karl-Heinz Rummenigge for West Germany at the 1982 FIFA World Cup, a game which Chile lost 1–4.

== Hat-tricks scored by Chile ==
Scores and results list Chile's goal tally first.

No.	Player	Date	Opponent	Venue	Goals	Result	Competition	Ref.
1	David Arellano	12 October 1926	Bolivia	Campos de Sports de Ñuñoa, Santiago, Chile	4 – (15', 41', 62', 80')	7–1	1926 South American Championship	
2	David Arellano (2)	3 November 1926	Paraguay	Campos de Sports de Ñuñoa, Santiago, Chile	3 – (21', 64', 71')	5–1	1926 South American Championship	
3	Guillermo Subiabre	5 June 1928	Mexico	Monnikenhuize, Arnhem, Netherlands	3 – (24', 48', 89')	3–1	1928 Summer Olympics Consolation round	
4	Raúl Toro	26 February 1939	Paraguay	Santiago, Chile	3	4–1	Friendly	
5	Juan Alcántara	14 January 1945	Ecuador	Estadio Nacional, Santiago, Chile	3 – (28', 59', 81')	6–3	1945 South American Championship	
6	Guillermo Clavero	24 January 1945	Bolivia	Estadio Nacional, Santiago, Chile	3 – (13', 27', 39')	5–0	1945 South American Championship	
7	Andrés Prieto	16 March 1952	Panama	Estadio Nacional, Santiago, Chile	3 – (27', 45', 81')	6–1	1952 Panamerican Championship	
8	Francisco Molina	1 March 1953	Uruguay	Estadio Nacional, Lima, Peru	3 – (5', 55', 67')	3–2	1953 South American Championship	
9	Enrique Hormazábal	27 February 1955	Ecuador	Estadio Nacional, Santiago, Chile	3 – (27', 47', 53')	7–1	1955 South American Championship	
10	Julio Crisosto	26 January 1977	Paraguay	Santiago, Chile	3 – (9', 35', 75')	4–0	Friendly	
11	Jorge Aravena	24 August 1983	Bolivia	Carlos Dittborn Stadium, Arica, Chile	3 – (15', 22', 42')	4–2	Friendly	
12	Juan Carlos Letelier	27 August 1989	Venezuela	Estadio Malvinas Argentinas, Mendoza, Argentina	3 – (14', 34', 69')	5–0	1990 FIFA World Cup qualification	
13	Iván Zamorano	29 April 1997	Venezuela	Estadio Monumental, Santiago, Chile	5 – (19', 27', 32', 47', 85')	6–0	1998 FIFA World Cup qualification	
14	Marcelo Salas	5 July 1997	Colombia	Estadio Nacional, Santiago, Chile	3 – (16', 26', 41')	4–1	1998 FIFA World Cup qualification	
15	Marcelo Salas (2)	12 October 1997	Peru	Estadio Nacional, Santiago, Chile	3 – (13', 82', 88')	4–0	1998 FIFA World Cup qualification	
16	Claudio Núñez	7 November 1997	Guatemala	Estadio Regional de Antofagasta, Antofagasta, Chile	3 – (27', 30', 71')	4–1	Friendly	
17	Sebastián Pinto	21 December 2011	Paraguay	Estadio La Portada, La Serena, Chile	3 – (19', 62' pen, 74')	3–2	Friendly	
18	Eduardo Vargas	18 June 2016	Mexico	Levi's Stadium, Santa Clara, United States	4 – (44', 52', 57', 74')	7–0	Copa América Centenario	
19	Ben Brereton Díaz	16 June 2023	Dominican Republic	Sausalito Stadium, Viña del Mar, Chile	3 – (11', 17', 25')	5–0	Friendly	
20	Nicolás Guerra	8 February 2025	Panama	Estadio Nacional Julio Martínez Prádanos	3 – (2', 25', 42')	6–1	Friendly	

== Hat-tricks conceded by Chile ==
Scores and results list Chile's goal tally first.

No.	Player	Date	Opponent	Venue	Goals	Result	Competition	Ref.
1	Arthur Friedenreich	11 May 1919	Brazil	Estádio de Laranjeiras, Rio de Janeiro, Brazil	3 – (19', 38', 76')	0–6	1919 South American Championship	
2	José Clarke	22 May 1919	Argentina	Estádio de Laranjeiras, Rio de Janeiro, Brazil	3' – (10', 23', 62')	1–4	1919 South American Championship	
3	Manuel Seoane	25 September 1921	Argentina	Valparaiso Sporting Club, Viña del Mar, Chile	3 – (15', 70', 73')	1–4	Friendly	
4	Manuel Seoane (2)	12 December 1923	Argentina	Buenos Aires, Argentina	3	0–6	Friendly	
5	Domingo Tarasconi	12 December 1923	Argentina	Buenos Aires, Argentina	3	0–6	Friendly	
6	Pedro Petrone	19 October 1924	Uruguay	Parque Central, Montevideo, Uruguay	3 – (40', 53', 88')	0–5	1924 South American Championship	
7	Ángel Laferrara	2 March 1940	Argentina	Buenos Aires, Argentina	3 – (42', 57', 68')	1–4	Friendly	
8	Luis Arrieta	9 March 1940	Argentina	Estadio Gasómetro, Buenos Aires, Argentina	3 – (56', 74', 83')	2–3	Friendly	
9	Sylvio Pirillo	14 January 1942	Brazil	Estadio Centenario, Montevideo, Uruguay	3 – (23', 63', 86')	1–6	1942 South American Championship	
10	Zizinho	3 February 1946	Brazil	Estadio Gasómetro, Buenos Aires, Argentina	4 – (4', 41', 46', 71')	1–5	1946 South American Championship	
11	Dionisio Arce	27 April 1949	Paraguay	Estádio Municipal, São Paulo, Brazil	3 – (10', 39', 47')	2–4	1949 South American Championship	
12	Humberto Maschio	13 March 1957	Argentina	Estadio Nacional, Lima, Peru	4 – (16', 23', 53', 85')	2–8	1957 South American Championship	
13	Didi	13 March 1957	Brazil	Estadio Nacional, Lima, Peru	3 – (20', 26', 44')	2–4	1957 South American Championship	
14	Pelé	17 September 1959	Brazil	Estádio Municipal, Rio de Janeiro, Brazil	3	0–7	Copa Bernardo O'Higgins	
15	Eduard Streltsov	17 December 1967	Soviet Union	Estadio Nacional, Santiago, Chile	3 – (60', 66', 85')	1–4	Friendly	
16	Karl-Heinz Rummenigge	20 June 1982	West Germany	El Molinón, Gijón, Spain	3 – (9', 57', 66')	1–4	1982 FIFA World Cup	
17	Flavio Maestri	19 April 1995	Peru	Estadio Nacional, Lima, Peru	3 – (2', 6', 39')	0–6	Friendly	
18	Ronald Baroni	19 April 1995	Peru	Estadio Nacional, Lima, Peru	3 – (28', 66', 7')	0–6	Friendly	
19	Faustino Asprilla	1 September 1996	Colombia	Estadio Metropolitano, Barranquilla, Colombia	3 – (3', 31', 47')	1–4	1998 FIFA World Cup qualification	
20	Adrianp	4 September 2005	Brazil	Estádio Nacional Mané Garrincha, Brasília, Brazil	3 – (27', 29', 90')	0–5	2006 FIFA World Cup qualification	
21	Robinho	1 July 2007	Brazil	Estadio Monumental de Maturín, Maturín, Venezuela	3 – (36' pen, 84', 87')	0–3	2007 Copa América	
22	Nilmar	9 September 2009	Brazil	Estádio de Pituaçu, Salvador, Brazil	3 – (31', 73', 76')	2–4	2010 FIFA World Cup qualification	
23	Gonzalo Higuaín	7 October 2011	Argentina	Estadio Monumental, Buenos Aires, Argentina	3 – (7', 52', 63')	1–4	2014 FIFA World Cup qualification	
24	Luis Suárez	11 November 2011	Uruguay	Estadio Centenario, Montevideo, Uruguay	4 – (42', 45', 68', 73')	0–4	2014 FIFA World Cup qualification	
