= 2006 FIFA World Cup qualification (CONMEBOL) =

Tournament details
- Dates: 6 September 2003 – 12 October 2005
- Teams: 10 (from 1 confederation)

Tournament statistics
- Matches played: 90
- Goals scored: 235 (2.61 per match)
- Attendance: 3,016,252 (33,514 per match)
- Top scorer(s): (Brazil) Ronaldo (10 goals)

Listed below are the dates and results for the 2006 FIFA World Cup qualification rounds for South America. 10 teams took part, all in a single group. The rules were very simple: the teams would play against each other in a home-and-away basis, with the four teams with most points qualifying to the 2006 FIFA World Cup. The fifth ranked team would have to play-off against the best team from Oceania, with the winner of this play-off also qualifying. For the first time, defending champions Brazil was required to go through the qualifying process and did not automatically qualify for the tournament.

== Standings ==
Pos	Team	Pld	W	D	L	GF	GA	GD	Pts	Qualification	(Brazil)	(Argentina)	(Ecuador)	(Paraguay)	(Uruguay)	(Colombia)	(Chile)	(Venezuela)	(Peru)	(Bolivia)
1	Brazil	18	9	7	2	35	17	+18	34 (Note: Tied on head-to-head results. Overall goal difference was used as the tiebreaker.)	2006 FIFA World Cup	—	3–1	1–0	4–1	3–3	0–0	5–0	3–0	1–0	3–1
2	Argentina	18	10	4	4	29	17	+12	34	2006 FIFA World Cup	3–1	—	1–0	0–0	4–2	1–0	2–2	3–2	2–0	3–0
3	Ecuador	18	8	4	6	23	19	+4	28 (Note: Tied on head-to-head points (3). Head-to-head goal difference: Ecuador +2, Paraguay −2.)	2006 FIFA World Cup	1–0	2–0	—	5–2	0–0	2–1	2–0	2–0	0–0	3–2
4	Paraguay	18	8	4	6	23	23	0	28	2006 FIFA World Cup	0–0	1–0	2–1	—	4–1	0–1	2–1	1–0	1–1	4–1
5	Uruguay	18	6	7	5	23	28	−5	25	Inter-confederation play-off	1–1	1–0	1–0	1–0	—	3–2	2–1	0–3	1–3	5–0
6	Colombia	18	6	6	6	24	16	+8	24		1–2	1–1	3–0	1–1	5–0	—	1–1	0–1	5–0	1–0
7	Chile	18	5	7	6	18	22	−4	22		1–1	0–0	0–0	0–1	1–1	0–0	—	2–1	2–1	3–1
8	Venezuela	18	5	3	10	20	28	−8	18 (Note: Head-to-head points: Venezuela 4, Peru 1.)		2–5	0–3	3–1	0–1	1–1	0–0	0–1	—	4–1	2–1
9	Peru	18	4	6	8	20	28	−8	18		1–1	1–3	2–2	4–1	0–0	0–2	2–1	0–0	—	4–1
10	Bolivia	18	4	2	12	20	37	−17	14		1–1	1–2	1–2	2–1	0–0	4–0	0–2	3–1	1–0	—

Rules for classification: Tiebreakers

== Matches ==
=== Matchday 1 ===
6 September 2003
16:00 UTC-5

Ecuador	2–0	Venezuela
Espinoza 5'; C. Tenorio 72'	Report

Estadio Olímpico Atahualpa, Quito
Attendance: 14,997
Referee: Rubén Selman (Chile)

6 September 2003
16:00 UTC−3

Argentina	2–2	Chile
C. Gonzalez 32'; Aimar 35'	Report	60' Mirosević; 77' Navia

Estadio Monumental Antonio Vespucio Liberti, Buenos Aires
Attendance: 35,372
Referee: Ubaldo Aquino (Paraguay)

6 September 2003
20:15 UTC−5

Peru	4–1	Paraguay
Solano 34'; Mendoza 42'; Soto 83'; Farfán 90'	Report	24' Gamarra

Estadio Nacional, Lima
Attendance: 42,557
Referee: Héctor Baldassi (Argentina)

7 September 2003
16:00 UTC−3

Uruguay	5–0	Bolivia
Forlan 18'; Chevantón 40', 61'; Abeijon 83'; Bueno 88'	Report

Estadio Centenario, Montevideo
Attendance: 39,253
Referee: Gilberto Hidalgo (Peru)

7 September 2003
16:15 UTC−5

Colombia	1–2	Brazil
Ángel 38'	Report	22' Ronaldo; 60' Kaká

Estadio Metropolitano Roberto Meléndez, Barranquilla
Attendance: 47,600
Referee: Horacio Elizondo (Argentina)

=== Matchday 2 ===
9 September 2003
19:00 UTC−4

Venezuela	0–3	Argentina
	Report	Aimar 7'; Crespo 25'; Delgado 32'

Estadio Olímpico, Caracas
Attendance: 24,783
Referee: Martín Vázquez (Uruguay)

9 September 2003
21:15 UTC−4

Chile	2–1	Peru
Pinilla 35'; Norambuena 70'	Report	Mendoza 57'

Estadio Nacional, Santiago
Attendance: 54,303
Referee: Daniel Giménez (Argentina)

10 September 2003
16:00 UTC−4

Bolivia	4–0	Colombia
Baldivieso 11' (pen.); Botero 27', 49', 59'	Report

Estadio Hernando Siles, La Paz
Attendance: 23,200
Referee: Paulo César de Oliveira (Brazil)

10 September 2003
19:00 UTC−4

Paraguay	4–1	Uruguay
Cardozo 26', 58', 72'; Paredes 53'	Report	Chevantón 24'

Estadio Defensores del Chaco, Asunción
Attendance: 15,000
Referee: Óscar Ruiz (Colombia)

10 September 2003
21:00 UTC−4

Brazil	1–0	Ecuador
Ronaldinho 13'	Report

Vivaldão, Manaus
Attendance: 36,601
Referee: Luis Solórzano (Venezuela)

=== Matchday 3 ===
15 November 2003
15:00 UTC−3

Uruguay	2–1	Chile
Chevantón 31'; Romero 49'	Report	Meléndez 21'

Estadio Centenario, Montevideo
Attendance: 60,000
Referee: Claudio Martín (Argentina)

15 November 2003
16:00 UTC−5

Colombia	0–1	Venezuela
	Report	Arango 9'

Estadio Metropolitano Roberto Meléndez, Barranquilla
Attendance: 20,000
Referee: Carlos Chandía (Chile)

15 November 2003
19:15 UTC−3

Paraguay	2–1	Ecuador
Santa Cruz 29'; Cardozo 75'	Report	Méndez 58'

Estadio Defensores del Chaco, Asunción
Attendance: 12,000
Referee: Juan Carlos Paniagua (Bolivia)

15 November 2003
21:30 UTC−3

Argentina	3–0	Bolivia
D'Alessandro 56'; Crespo 61'; Aimar 63'	Report

Estadio Monumental Antonio Vespucio Liberti, Buenos Aires
Attendance: 30,042
Referee: Gilberto Hidalgo (Peru)

16 November 2003
16:00 UTC−5

Peru	1–1	Brazil
Solano 57'	Report	Rivaldo 20' (pen.)

Estadio Monumental "U", Lima
Attendance: 70,000
Referee: Óscar Ruiz (Colombia)

=== Matchday 4 ===
18 November 2003
19:00 UTC−4

Venezuela	2–1	Bolivia
Rey 90'; Arango 90+2'	Report	Botero 60'

Estadio José Pachencho Romero, Maracaibo
Attendance: 30,000
Referee: Mauricio Reinoso (Ecuador)

18 November 2003
22:00 UTC−3

Chile	0–1	Paraguay
	Report	Paredes 30'

Estadio Nacional, Santiago
Attendance: 61,923
Referee: Gustavo Méndez (Uruguay)

19 November 2003
17:00 UTC−5

Ecuador	0–0	Peru
	Report

Estadio Olímpico Atahualpa, Quito
Attendance: 34,361
Referee: Epifanio González (Paraguay)

19 November 2003
21:00 UTC−5

Colombia	1–1	Argentina
Ángel 47'	Report	Crespo 27'

Estadio Metropolitano Roberto Meléndez, Barranquilla
Attendance: 19,034
Referee: Carlos Eugênio Simon (Brazil)

19 November 2003
21:45 UTC−2

Brazil	3–3	Uruguay
Kaká 20'; Ronaldo 28', 87'	Report	Forlán 57', 76'; Gilberto Silva 78' (o.g.)

Pinheirão, Curitiba
Attendance: 28,000
Referee: Horacio Elizondo (Argentina)

=== Matchday 5 ===
30 March 2004
16:00 UTC−4

Bolivia	0–2	Chile
	Report	Villarroel 37'; M. González 59'

Estadio Hernando Siles, La Paz
Attendance: 40,000
Referee: Claudio Martín (Argentina)

30 March 2004
20:30 UTC−3

Argentina	1–0	Ecuador
Crespo 60'	Report

Estadio Monumental Antonio Vespucio Liberti, Buenos Aires
Attendance: 55,000
Referee: Martín Vázquez (Uruguay)

31 March 2004
19:40 UTC−3

Uruguay	0–3	Venezuela
	Report	Urdaneta 19'; H. González 67'; Arango 77'

Estadio Centenario, Montevideo
Attendance: 40,094
Referee: René Ortubé (Bolivia)

31 March 2004
21:45 UTC−5

Peru	0–2	Colombia
	Report	Grisales 30'; Oviedo 42'

Estadio Nacional, Lima
Attendance: 29,325
Referee: Márcio Rezende de Freitas (Brazil)

31 March 2004
21:45 UTC−3

Paraguay	0–0	Brazil
	Report

Estadio Defensores del Chaco, Asunción
Attendance: 40,000
Referee: Óscar Ruiz (Colombia)

=== Matchday 6 ===
1 June 2004
16:00 UTC−4

Bolivia	2–1	Paraguay
Cristaldo 8'; Suárez 72'	Report	Cardozo 33'

Estadio Hernando Siles, La Paz
Attendance: 23,013
Referee: Márcio Rezende de Freitas (Brazil)

1 June 2004
19:00 UTC−4

Venezuela	0–1	Chile
	Report	Pinilla 83'

Estadio Polideportivo de Pueblo Nuevo, San Cristóbal
Attendance: 23,040
Referee: Carlos Torres (Paraguay)

1 June 2004
21:40 UTC−3

Uruguay	1–3	Peru
Forlán 72'	Report	Solano 13'; Pizarro 18'; Farfán 61'

Estadio Centenario, Montevideo
Attendance: 30,000
Referee: Rubén Selman (Chile)

2 June 2004
16:00 UTC−5

Ecuador	2–1	Colombia
Delgado 3'; Salas 66'	Report	Oviedo 57'

Estadio Olímpico Atahualpa, Quito
Attendance: 31,484
Referee: Héctor Baldassi (Argentina)

2 June 2004
21:45 UTC−3

Brazil	3–1	Argentina
Ronaldo 16' (pen.), 67' (pen.), 90+6' (pen.)	Report	Sorín 79'

Mineirão, Belo Horizonte
Attendance: 60,000
Referee: Óscar Ruiz (Colombia)

=== Matchday 7 ===
5 June 2004
16:00 UTC−5

Ecuador	3–2	Bolivia
Soliz 27' (o.g.); Delgado 32' de la Cruz 38'	Report	Gutiérrez 57'; Castillo 74'

Estadio Olímpico Atahualpa, Quito
Attendance: 30,020
Referee: Gustavo Brand (Venezuela)

6 June 2004
15:00 UTC−5

Peru	0–0	Venezuela
	Report

Estadio Nacional, Lima
Attendance: 40,000
Referee: Jorge Larrionda (Uruguay)

6 June 2004
15:00 UTC−3

Argentina	0–0	Paraguay
	Report

Estadio Monumental Antonio Vespucio Liberti, Buenos Aires
Attendance: 37,000
Referee: Carlos Simon (Brazil)

6 June 2004
17:10 UTC−5

Colombia	5–0	Uruguay
Pacheco 17', 31'; Moreno 20'; Restrepo 81'; Herrera 86'	Report

Estadio Metropolitano Roberto Meléndez, Barranquilla
Attendance: 7,000
Referee: Carlos Amarilla (Paraguay)

6 June 2004
21:30 UTC−4

Chile	1–1	Brazil
Navia 89' (pen.)	Report	Luís Fabiano 16'

Estadio Nacional, Santiago
Attendance: 62,503
Referee: Horacio Elizondo (Argentina)

=== Matchday 8 ===
4 September 2004
19:00 UTC−5

Peru	1–3	Argentina
Soto 62'	Report	Rosales 14'; Coloccini 66'; Sorín 90+2'

Estadio Monumental "U", Lima
Attendance: 28,000
Referee: Carlos Eugênio Simon (Brazil)

5 September 2004
15:15 UTC−3

Uruguay	1–0	Ecuador
Bueno 57'	Report

Estadio Centenario, Montevideo
Attendance: 28,000
Referee: Gilberto Hidalgo (Peru)

5 September 2004
17:10 UTC−3

Brazil	3–1	Bolivia
Ronaldo 1'; Ronaldinho 12' (pen.); Adriano 44'	Report	Cristaldo 48'

Estádio do Morumbi, São Paulo
Attendance: 60,000
Referee: Héctor Baldassi (Argentina)

5 September 2004
18:20 UTC−4

Paraguay	1–0	Venezuela
Gamarra 52'	Report

Estadio Defensores del Chaco, Asunción
Attendance: 30,000
Referee: Gustavo Méndez (Uruguay)

5 September 2004
21:00 UTC−4

Chile	0–0	Colombia
	Report

Estadio Nacional, Santiago
Attendance: 62,523
Referee: Wilson de Souza Mendonça (Brazil)

=== Matchday 9 ===
9 October 2004
15:00 UTC−3

Argentina	4–2	Uruguay
González 6'; Figueroa 32', 54'; Zanetti 44'	Report	C. Rodríguez 63'; Chevantón 86' (pen.)

Estadio Monumental Antonio Vespucio Liberti, Buenos Aires
Attendance: 50,000
Referee: Wilson de Souza Mendonça (Brazil)

9 October 2004
16:00 UTC−4

Bolivia	1–0	Peru
Botero 56'	Report

Estadio Hernando Siles, La Paz
Attendance: 23,729
Referee: Mauricio Reinoso (Ecuador)

9 October 2004
17:10 UTC−5

Colombia	1–1	Paraguay
Grisales 17'	Report	Gavilán 77'

Estadio Metropolitano Roberto Meléndez, Barranquilla
Attendance: 25,000
Referee: Horacio Elizondo (Argentina)

9 October 2004
21:00 UTC−4

Venezuela	2–5	Brazil
Morán 79', 90'	Report	Kaká 5', 34'; Ronaldo 48', 50'; Adriano 75'

Estadio José Pachencho Romero, Maracaibo
Attendance: 26,133
Referee: Carlos Chandía (Chile)

10 October 2004
17:00 UTC−5

Ecuador	2–0	Chile
Kaviedes 49'; Méndez 64'	Report

Estadio Olímpico Atahualpa, Quito
Attendance: 27,956
Referee: René Ortubé (Bolivia)

=== Matchday 10 ===
12 October 2004
16:00 UTC−4

Bolivia	0–0	Uruguay
	Report

Estadio Hernando Siles, La Paz
Attendance: 24,349
Referee: Márcio Rezende de Freitas (Brazil)

13 October 2004
17:00 UTC−4

Paraguay	1–1	Peru
Paredes 13'	Report	Solano 74' (pen.)

Estadio Defensores del Chaco, Asunción
Attendance: 30,000
Referee: Óscar Ruiz (Colombia)

13 October 2004
20:00 UTC−3

Chile	0–0	Argentina
	Report

Estadio Nacional, Santiago
Attendance: 57,671
Referee: Carlos Amarilla (Paraguay)

13 October 2004
21:50 UTC−3

Brazil	0–0	Colombia
	Report

Estádio Rei Pelé, Maceió
Attendance: 20,000
Referee: Jorge Larrionda (Uruguay)

14 October 2004
19:00 UTC−4

Venezuela	3–1	Ecuador
Urdaneta 20' (pen.); Morán 72', 80'	Report	M. Ayoví 41' (pen.)

Estadio Polideportivo de Pueblo Nuevo, San Cristóbal
Attendance: 13,800
Referee: Eduardo Lecca (Peru)

=== Matchday 11 ===
17 November 2004
16:00 UTC−5

Ecuador	1–0	Brazil
Méndez 77'	Report

Estadio Olímpico Atahualpa, Quito
Attendance: 38,308
Referee: Óscar Ruiz (Colombia)

17 November 2004
18:00 UTC−5

Colombia	1–0	Bolivia
Yepes 18'	Report

Estadio Metropolitano Roberto Meléndez, Barranquilla
Attendance: 25,000
Referee: Carlos Torres (Paraguay)

17 November 2004
20:00 UTC−5

Peru	2–1	Chile
Farfán 56'; Guerrero 85'	Report	S. González 90+1'

Estadio Nacional, Lima
Attendance: 39,752
Referee: Héctor Baldassi (Argentina)

17 November 2004
20:45 UTC−2

Uruguay	1–0	Paraguay
Montero 78'	Report

Estadio Centenario, Montevideo
Attendance: 35,000
Referee: Carlos Simon (Brazil)

17 November 2004
21:45 UTC−3

Argentina	3–2	Venezuela
Rey 3' (o.g.); Riquelme 45+1'; Saviola 65'	Report	Morán 31'; Vielma 72'

Estadio Monumental Antonio Vespucio Liberti, Buenos Aires
Attendance: 30,000
Referee: Gilberto Hidalgo (Peru)

=== Matchday 12 ===
26 March 2005
16:00 UTC−4

Bolivia	1–2	Argentina
Castillo 49'	Report	Figueroa 57'; Galletti 63'

Estadio Hernando Siles, La Paz
Attendance: 25,000
Referee: Jorge Larrionda (Uruguay)

26 March 2005
19:00 UTC−4

Venezuela	0–0	Colombia
	Report

Estadio José Pachencho Romero, Maracaibo
Attendance: 18,000
Referee: Carlos Simon (Brazil)

26 March 2005
22:00 UTC−4

Chile	1–1	Uruguay
Mirosević 47'	Report	Regueiro 4'

Estadio Nacional, Santiago
Attendance: 55,000
Referee: Óscar Ruiz (Colombia)

27 March 2005
16:00 UTC−3

Brazil	1–0	Peru
Kaká 74'	Report

Estádio Serra Dourada, Goiânia
Attendance: 49,163
Referee: Carlos Amarilla (Paraguay)

27 March 2005
16:10 UTC−5

Ecuador	5–2	Paraguay
Valencia 32', 49'; Méndez 45+2', 47'; M. Ayoví 77' (pen.)	Report	Cardozo 10' (pen.); Cabañas 14'

Estadio Olímpico Atahualpa, Quito
Attendance: 32,449
Referee: Gustavo Méndez (Uruguay)

=== Matchday 13 ===
29 March 2005
16:00 UTC−4

Bolivia	3–1	Venezuela
Cichero 2' (o.g.); Castillo 25'; Vaca 84'	Report	Maldonado 71'

Estadio Hernando Siles, La Paz
Attendance: 7,908
Referee: Eduardo Lecca (Peru)

30 March 2005
19:00 UTC−4

Paraguay	2–1	Chile
Morínigo 37'; Cardozo 59'	Report	Pinilla 72'

Estadio Defensores del Chaco, Asunción
Attendance: 10,000
Referee: Horacio Elizondo (Argentina)

30 March 2005
20:00 UTC−3

Argentina	1–0	Colombia
Crespo 65'	Report

Estadio Monumental Antonio Vespucio Liberti, Buenos Aires
Attendance: 40,000
Referee: Carlos Amarilla (Paraguay)

30 March 2005
20:00 UTC−5

Peru	2–2	Ecuador
Guerrero 1'; Farfán 58'	Report	de la Cruz 4'; Valencia 45'

Estadio Nacional, Lima
Attendance: 40,000
Referee: Carlos Chandía (Chile)

30 March 2005
21:30 UTC−3

Uruguay	1–1	Brazil
Forlán 48'	Report	Emerson 67'

Estadio Centenario, Montevideo
Attendance: 60,000
Referee: Héctor Baldassi (Argentina)

=== Matchday 14 ===
4 June 2005
15:00 UTC−5

Colombia	5–0	Peru
L.G. Rey 29'; Soto 55'; Ángel 58'; Restrepo 75'; E. Perea 78'	Report

Estadio Metropolitano Roberto Meléndez, Barranquilla
Attendance: 15,000
Referee: Carlos Torres (Paraguay)

4 June 2005
16:00 UTC−5

Ecuador	2–0	Argentina
Lara 53'; Delgado 89'	Report

Estadio Olímpico Atahualpa, Quito
Attendance: 37,583
Referee: Rubén Selman (Chile)

4 June 2005
19:00 UTC−4

Venezuela	1–1	Uruguay
Maldonado 74'	Report	Forlán 2'

Estadio José Pachencho Romero, Maracaibo
Attendance: 12,504
Referee: Gabriel Brazenas (Argentina)

4 June 2005
21:00 UTC−4

Chile	3–1	Bolivia
Fuentes 8', 34'; Salas 66'	Report	Castillo 83' (pen.)

Estadio Nacional, Santiago
Attendance: 46,729
Referee: Márcio Rezende de Freitas (Brazil)

5 June 2005
16:00 UTC−3

Brazil	4–1	Paraguay
Ronaldinho 32' (pen.), 41' (pen.); Zé Roberto 70'; Robinho 82'	Report	Santa Cruz 72'

Estádio Beira-Rio, Porto Alegre
Attendance: 45,000
Referee: Martín Vázquez (Uruguay)

=== Matchday 15 ===
7 June 2005
20:00 UTC−5

Peru	0–0	Uruguay
	Report

Estadio Nacional, Lima
Attendance: 31,515
Referee: Héctor Baldassi (Argentina)

8 June 2005
15:00 UTC−5

Colombia	3–0	Ecuador
Moreno 5', 9'; Arzuaga 70'	Report

Estadio Metropolitano Roberto Meléndez, Barranquilla
Attendance: 20,402
Referee: Carlos Eugênio Simon (Brazil)

8 June 2005
19:00 UTC−4

Chile	2–1	Venezuela
Jiménez 31', 60'	Report	Morán 82'

Estadio Nacional, Santiago
Attendance: 35,506
Referee: Carlos Torres (Paraguay)

8 June 2005
19:15 UTC−4

Paraguay	4–1	Bolivia
Gamarra 17'; Santa Cruz 45+1'; Cáceres 54'; Núñez 68'	Report	Galindo 30'

Estadio Defensores del Chaco, Asunción
Attendance: 5,534
Referee: Gustavo Brand (Venezuela)

8 June 2005
21:45 UTC−3

Argentina	3–1	Brazil
Crespo 3', 40'; Riquelme 18'	Report	Roberto Carlos 71'

Estadio Monumental Antonio Vespucio Liberti, Buenos Aires
Attendance: 49,497
Referee: Gustavo Méndez (Uruguay)

=== Matchday 16 ===
3 September 2005
15:00 UTC−4

Bolivia	1–2	Ecuador
Vaca 41'	Report	Delgado 8', 49'

Estadio Hernando Siles, La Paz
Attendance: 8,434
Referee: Héctor Baldassi (Argentina)

3 September 2005
17:00 UTC−4

Paraguay	1–0	Argentina
Santa Cruz 14'	Report

Estadio Defensores del Chaco, Asunción
Attendance: 32,000
Referee: Carlos Eugênio Simon (Brazil)

3 September 2005
19:00 UTC−4

Venezuela	4–1	Peru
Maldonado 17'; Arango 68'; Torrealba 73', 79'	Report	Farfán 63'

Estadio José Pachencho Romero, Maracaibo
Attendance: 6,000
Referee: Márcio Rezende de Freitas (Brazil)

4 September 2005
16:00 UTC−3

Brazil	5–0	Chile
Juan 11'; Robinho 21'; Adriano 27', 29', 90+3'	Report

Estádio Mané Garrincha, Brasília
Attendance: 39,000
Referee: Carlos Amarilla (Paraguay)

4 September 2005
18:20 UTC−3

Uruguay	3–2	Colombia
Zalayeta 42', 51', 86'	Report	Soto 79'; Ángel 82'

Estadio Centenario, Montevideo
Attendance: 60,000
Referee: Horacio Elizondo (Argentina)

=== Matchday 17 ===
8 October 2005
16:00 UTC−5

Ecuador	0–0	Uruguay
	Report

Estadio Olímpico Atahualpa, Quito
Attendance: 37,270
Referee: Márcio Rezende de Freitas (Brazil)

8 October 2005
16:00 UTC−5

Colombia	1–1	Chile
Rey 24'	Report	Rojas 64'

Estadio Metropolitano Roberto Meléndez, Barranquilla
Attendance: 22,380
Referee: Wilson de Souza Mendonça (Brazil)

8 October 2005
17:00 UTC−4

Venezuela	0–1	Paraguay
	Report	Valdez 64'

Estadio José Pachencho Romero, Maracaibo
Attendance: 13,272
Referee: Horacio Elizondo (Argentina)

9 October 2005
16:00 UTC−4

Bolivia	1–1	Brazil
Castillo 49'	Report	Juninho 25'

Estadio Hernando Siles, La Paz
Attendance: 22,725
Referee: Jorge Larrionda (Uruguay)

9 October 2005
19:10 UTC−3

Argentina	2–0	Peru
Riquelme 81' (pen.); Guadalupe 90+2' (o.g.)	Report

Estadio Monumental Antonio Vespucio Liberti, Buenos Aires
Attendance: 36,977
Referee: Carlos Torres (Paraguay)

=== Matchday 18 ===
12 October 2005
20:00 UTC−5

Peru	4–1	Bolivia
Vassallo 11'; Acasiete 38'; Farfán 45', 82'	Report	Gutiérrez 66'

Estadio Jorge Basadre, Tacna
Attendance: 14,774
Referee: Oscar Sequeira (Argentina)

12 October 2005
20:30 UTC−4

Paraguay	0–1	Colombia
	Report	Rey 7'

Estadio Defensores del Chaco, Asunción
Attendance: 12,374
Referee: Márcio Rezende de Freitas (Brazil)

12 October 2005
21:30 UTC−3

Brazil	3–0	Venezuela
Adriano 28'; Ronaldo 51'; Roberto Carlos 61'	Report

Mangueirão, Belém
Attendance: 47,000
Referee: Héctor Baldassi (Argentina)

12 October 2005
21:30 UTC−3

Chile	0–0	Ecuador
	Report

Estadio Nacional, Santiago
Attendance: 49,530
Referee: Horacio Elizondo (Argentina)

12 October 2005
22:30 UTC−2

Uruguay	1–0	Argentina
Recoba 46'	Report

Estadio Centenario, Montevideo
Attendance: 55,000
Referee: Wilson de Souza Mendonça (Brazil)

== Inter-confederation play-offs ==
The fifth-placed team then played the winner of the OFC qualifying group, Australia, in a home-and-away play-off. The winner of this play-off qualified for the 2006 FIFA World Cup finals.

Team 1	Agg.	Team 2	1st leg	2nd leg
Uruguay	1–1 (2–4 p)	Australia	1–0	0–1 (a.e.t.)

== Qualified teams ==
The following four teams from CONMEBOL qualified for the final tournament.

Team	Qualified as	Qualified on	Previous appearances in FIFA World Cup^{1}
Brazil	Winners	5 September 2005	17 (all) (1930, 1934, 1938, 1950, 1954, **1958**, **1962**, 1966, **1970**, 1974, 1978, 1982, 1986, 1990, **1994**, 1998, **2002**)
Argentina	Runners-up	8 June 2005	13 (1930, 1934, 1958, 1962, 1966, 1974, **1978**, 1982, **1986**, 1990, 1994, 1998, 2002)
Ecuador	Third place	8 October 2005	1 (2002)
Paraguay	Fourth place	8 October 2005	6 (1930, 1950, 1958, 1986, 1998, 2002)

^{1} Bold indicates champions for that year. Italic indicates hosts for that year.

== Goalscorers ==
There were 235 goals scored in 90 matches, for an average of 2.61 goals per match.

10 goals

- (Brazil) Ronaldo

7 goals

- (Argentina) Hernán Crespo
- (Paraguay) José Cardozo
- (Peru) Jefferson Farfán

6 goals

- (Brazil) Adriano
- (Uruguay) Diego Forlán
- (Venezuela) Ruberth Morán

5 goals

- (Bolivia) Joaquín Botero
- (Bolivia) José Alfredo Castillo
- (Brazil) Kaká
- (Ecuador) Agustín Delgado
- (Ecuador) Edison Méndez
- (Uruguay) Javier Chevantón

4 goals

- (Brazil) Ronaldinho
- (Colombia) Juan Pablo Ángel
- (Paraguay) Roque Santa Cruz
- (Peru) Nolberto Solano
- (Venezuela) Juan Arango

3 goals

- (Argentina) Pablo Aimar
- (Argentina) Luciano Figueroa
- (Argentina) Juan Román Riquelme
- (Chile) Mauricio Pinilla
- (Colombia) Tressor Moreno
- (Colombia) Luis Gabriel Rey
- (Ecuador) Antonio Valencia
- (Paraguay) Carlos Gamarra
- (Paraguay) Carlos Humberto Paredes
- (Uruguay) Marcelo Zalayeta
- (Venezuela) Giancarlo Maldonado

2 goals

- (Argentina) Juan Pablo Sorín
- (Bolivia) Luis Cristaldo
- (Bolivia) Limberg Gutiérrez
- (Brazil) Roberto Carlos
- (Brazil) Robinho
- (Chile) Luis Fuentes
- (Chile) Luis Antonio Jiménez
- (Chile) Milovan Mirošević
- (Chile) Reinaldo Navia
- (Colombia) Freddy Grisales
- (Colombia) Frankie Oviedo
- (Colombia) Víctor Pacheco
- (Colombia) John Restrepo
- (Colombia) Elkin Soto
- (Ecuador) Marlon Ayoví
- (Ecuador) Ulises de la Cruz
- (Peru) Paolo Guerrero
- (Peru) Andrés Mendoza
- (Peru) Jorge Soto
- (Uruguay) Carlos Bueno
- (Venezuela) José Torrealba
- (Venezuela) Gabriel Urdaneta

1 goal

- (Argentina) Fabricio Coloccini
- (Argentina) Andrés D'Alessandro
- (Argentina) César Delgado
- (Argentina) Luciano Galletti
- (Argentina) Kily González
- (Argentina) Lucho González
- (Argentina) Mauro Rosales
- (Argentina) Javier Saviola
- (Argentina) Javier Zanetti
- (Bolivia) Julio César Baldivieso
- (Bolivia) Gonzalo Galindo
- (Bolivia) Roger Suárez
- (Bolivia) Doyle Vaca
- (Bolivia) Joselito Vaca
- (Brazil) Emerson
- (Brazil) Juan
- (Brazil) Luís Fabiano
- (Brazil) Juninho
- (Brazil) Rivaldo
- (Brazil) Zé Roberto
- (Chile) Mark González
- (Chile) Sebastián González
- (Chile) Rodrigo Meléndez
- (Chile) Arturo Norambuena
- (Chile) Ricardo Francisco Rojas
- (Chile) Marcelo Salas
- (Chile) Moisés Villarroel
- (Colombia) Martín Arzuaga
- (Colombia) Sergio Herrera
- (Colombia) Edixon Perea Valencia
- (Colombia) Mario Yepes
- (Ecuador) Giovanny Espinoza
- (Ecuador) Iván Kaviedes
- (Ecuador) Christian Lara
- (Ecuador) Franklin Salas
- (Ecuador) Carlos Tenorio
- (Paraguay) Julio César Cáceres
- (Paraguay) Diego Gavilán
- (Paraguay) Gustavo Morínigo
- (Paraguay) Jorge Martín Núñez
- (Paraguay) Nelson Valdez
- (Paraguay) Salvador Cabañas
- (Peru) Santiago Acasiete
- (Peru) Claudio Pizarro
- (Peru) Gustavo Vassallo
- (Uruguay) Nelson Abeijon
- (Uruguay) Paolo Montero
- (Uruguay) Álvaro Recoba
- (Uruguay) Mario Regueiro
- (Uruguay) Cristian Rodríguez
- (Uruguay) Adrián Romero
- (Venezuela) Héctor González
- (Venezuela) José Manuel Rey
- (Venezuela) Leonel Vielma

1 own goal

- (Bolivia) Hermán Solíz (against Ecuador)
- (Brazil) Gilberto Silva (against Uruguay)
- (Peru) Luis Guadalupe (against Argentina)
- (Venezuela) Alejandro Cichero (against Bolivia)
- (Venezuela) José Manuel Rey (against Argentina)

== See also ==
- 2010 FIFA World Cup qualification (CONMEBOL)
- 2002 FIFA World Cup qualification (CONMEBOL)
