= Hermán Solíz =

Bolivian footballer (born 1982)

Hérman Solíz
Personal information
- Full name: Hermán Solíz Salvatierra
- Date of birth: 14 July 1982 (age 44)
- Place of birth: Montero, Bolivia
- Height: 1.72 m (5 ft 8 in)
- Position: Defender

Senior career*
Years	Team	Apps	(Gls)
1998	Atlético Gonzalez		
1999	The Strongest		
2000	Mariscal Braun	40	(2)
2001–2004	The Strongest	126	(3)
2005–2006	Blooming	55	(2)
2006–2007	The Strongest	42	(3)
2008	Blooming	8	(0)
2009–2010	The Strongest	69	(3)
2011–2012	Universitario de Sucre	10	(0)
2012–2013	La Paz		
2013–2014	Guabirá		
2016–2018	Potosí		

International career
2004–2007	Bolivia	3	(0)
- * Club domestic league appearances and goals

Hermán Solíz Salvatierra (born 14 July 1982) is a Bolivian former football defender. Solíz was a member of the Bolivia national football team in Copa América 2004.

== Club titles ==
Season	Team	Title
2003 (A)	The Strongest	Liga de Fútbol Profesional Boliviano
2003 (C)	The Strongest	Liga de Fútbol Profesional Boliviano
2004 (C)	The Strongest	Liga de Fútbol Profesional Boliviano
2005 (A)	Blooming	Liga de Fútbol Profesional Boliviano
