= Raúl González (footballer, born 1955) =

Chilean footballer

Personal information
- Full name: Raúl Isaac González San Vicente
- Date of birth: 2 December 1955 (age 70)
- Place of birth: Valparaíso, Chile
- Position: Right-back

Youth career
- Guillermo Subiabre
- Colo-Colo

Senior career*
Years	Team	Apps	(Gls)
1975–1978	Santiago Wanderers		
1979–1982	Palestino		
1983	Moroka Swallows		
1985	Bush Bucks		
1986	AmaZulu		
1987	Moroka Swallows		

International career
1975	Chile U20		
1979	Chile	4	(0)

Managerial career
- 1999: African Wanderers (assistant)
- * Club domestic league appearances and goals

Raúl Isaac González San Vicente (born 2 December 1955) is a Chilean former footballer.

== Career ==
González played for clubs in both Chile and South Africa. In Chile, he played for Santiago Wanderers and Palestino. In South Africa, he played for Moroka Swallows, Bush Bucks and AmaZulu between 1984 and 1987. His last club was Moroka Swallows in 1987.

At international level, he represented Chile U20 in the 1975 South American Championship. At senior level, he played in four matches for the Chile national team in 1979. He was also part of Chile's squad for the 1979 Copa América tournament, where Chile was the runner-up.

In 1999, he worked as the assistant coach of Mario Tuane, who promoted his signing with Moroka Swallows in 1983, in the South African club African Wanderers.

== Personal life ==
He is the father of both the former Chile international footballer Mark González and the actor and football agent Raúl Hoffmann. His wife, Lorena Hoffmann, is the niece of the former Chile international footballers Carlos Hoffmann and Reynaldo Hoffmann, as well as the cousin of the also former footballers Reinaldo and Alejandro, sons of Reynaldo.

== Honours ==
Santiago Wanderers

- Segunda División de Chile (1): 1978

Moroka Swallows

- Mainstay Cup (1): 1983

Bush Bucks

- National Soccer League (1): 1985

Chile

- Copa Juan Pinto Durán (1): 1979
