= Mark González =

Chilean footballer (born 1984)

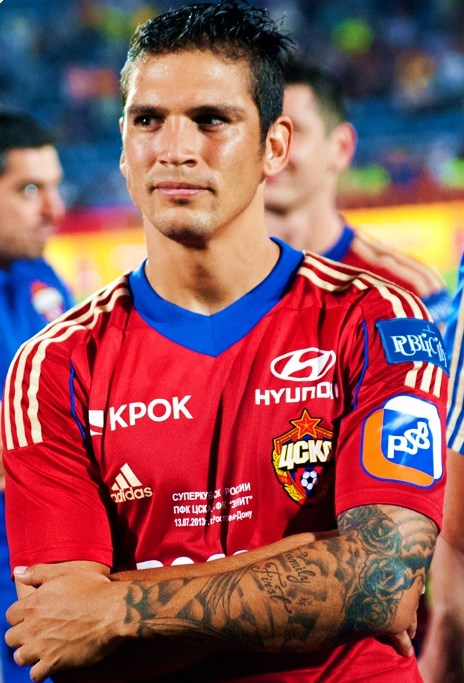
- González with CSKA Moscow in 2013

Personal information
- Full name: Mark Dennis González Hoffmann
- Date of birth: 10 July 1984 (age 42)
- Place of birth: Durban, South Africa
- Height: 1.76 m (5 ft 9 in)
- Position: Midfielder

Youth career
- SG Borken
- Universidad Católica

Senior career*
Years	Team	Apps	(Gls)
2002–2004	Universidad Católica	42	(13)
2004–2006	Albacete	25	(5)
2006–2007	Liverpool	25	(2)
2006	→ Real Sociedad (loan)	16	(6)
2007–2009	Betis	44	(10)
2009–2014	CSKA Moscow	49	(6)
2014–2015	Universidad Católica	41	(14)
2016	Sport Recife	8	(1)
2017	Colo-Colo	4	(0)
2018–2019	Magallanes	20	(5)
Total		274	(62)

International career^{‡}
2004	Chile U23	7	(2)
2003–2016	Chile	56	(6)
Medal record
Men's football
Representing Chile
Copa América
Winner	2016 United States
- * Club domestic league appearances and goals as of 16 January 2020 ‡ National team caps and goals as of 18 July 2016

Mark Dennis González Hoffmann (born 10 July 1984) is a former professional footballer who played as a midfielder. Born in South Africa, he played for the Chile national team.

He played top flight football in Chile, Russia, Spain, Brazil and England. He was described by José Mari Bakero, the sporting director of Real Sociedad, one of his former clubs, as "fast and explosive, the classic left winger but with technical discipline", while he claimed himself that his speed was his greatest asset.

He made his international debut in 2003, and was selected from Chile for three Copa América tournaments and the 2010 FIFA World Cup, winning the Copa América Centenario.

== Early life ==
González was born in Durban, South Africa. His father Raúl was a professional footballer for Durban Bush Bucks, and named him after his friends and fellow footballers Mark Tovey and Dennis Wicks. He left South Africa aged 10 in 1994 and moved back to Chile with his mother.

== Club career ==
=== Liverpool ===
European champions Liverpool attempted to sign González on loan from Albacete in the summer of 2005, but were unsuccessful as he was denied a work permit by British authorities. In October that year, a deal was struck between the two teams for a permanent transfer. In January 2006, while González awaited eligibility for a Spanish passport so he could work freely in Britain, Liverpool loaned him to Real Sociedad.

==== Real Sociedad (loan) ====
González was presented on loan at Real Sociedad on 30 January 2006, until 30 June, alongside Jhon Viáfara, whom the club had loaned from Portsmouth. González said that at Sociedad he would aim to improve his tactical play.

At Sociedad, González put in some good performances, most notably against Real Madrid, against whom he scored Sociedad's equaliser on 8 April as the game finished 1–1. He played 16 league games for Sociedad and scored five goals. Sociedad showed interest in taking him permanently, along with several other La Liga clubs, but González is quoted to have said, "I am very thankful to Real Sociedad and their coach José Mari Bakero, but while they'd like me to stay I'm going to England to join Liverpool."

==== Return to Liverpool ====
On 5 July 2006, González was granted a work permit, and was allowed to start his Liverpool career, wearing the number 11 shirt. His manager, Rafael Benítez, said, "This is very good news for us and I am absolutely delighted to welcome Mark González to Liverpool as he is a player the supporters will like to see." González made his first appearance as a half-time substitute for fellow debutant Fábio Aurélio in a pre-season friendly away against Crewe Alexandra on 22 July.

González made his competitive debut on 9 August 2006 against Israeli side Maccabi Haifa, coming off the bench in the 85th minute for Steven Gerrard and scoring an 88th-minute winner in Liverpool's Champions League 3rd round qualifier to seal a 2–1 win. He scored his first Premier League goal in Liverpool's 3–0 win over Tottenham Hotspur on his first league start for the club on 23 September. He scored just once more for Liverpool, in a 4–0 win over Fulham on 10 December.

González was injured inside the first ten minutes of the quarter-finals of the League Cup against Arsenal on 9 January 2007 as a result of a challenge on Theo Walcott. He was brought off on a stretcher for Luis García, who was also taken off injured later in the match as Liverpool lost 3–6. He played his last game for Liverpool on 5 May 2007 against Fulham in a 1–0 defeat.

=== Real Betis ===
On 24 May 2007, Rafael Benítez confirmed that Liverpool had almost reached an agreement with Real Betis over the Chilean winger. On 12 June, González confirmed that he had signed a contract for £5 million with Betis, who presented him to the press and fans on 17 July 2007. He went on to score on his home debut with a penalty goal in the 1–0 victory over Champions League holders Milan in the Centenary Match in front of 55,000 fans. González scored in a 2–1 victory over high-flying Real Madrid to steer Betis out of the relegation zone in La Liga. He ultimately scored ten goals in 44 first-team appearances for the club. Betis received an offer of €11 million from an unnamed club in July 2008.

=== CSKA Moscow ===
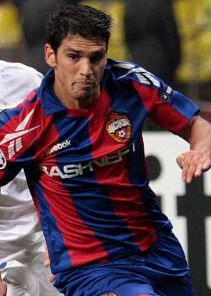
González in action against Inter Milan in the Champions League in April 2010

In June 2009, following the relegation of Real Betis, Greek double holders Olympiacos made an offer of €3 million to secure him a starting eleven position in their squad for the forthcoming Champions League, but CSKA Moscow offered €6.5 million and on 11 August 2009, he signed a five-year deal with the Russian club. He debuted for the club on 16 August 2009 in a league match away to Lokomotiv Moscow.

On 6 December 2010, it was reported that he had been accused of rape in Moscow. However, later the same day the investigators announced that the accused was an unrelated Portuguese citizen named Mario Gonzalez, who is also allegedly a professional footballer.

On 21 January 2014, CSKA announced that González had left them to join Universidad Católica in Chile on loan. In December 2014, González had his CSKA contract terminated by mutual consent.

=== Universidad Católica ===
Originally a loan, González joined his first professional club Universidad Católica in Chile in January 2015 after spending ten years abroad. After the mutual termination of his contract at CSKA, he joined Católica on a permanent move as a free agent. He helped the team with nine goals in the campaign, which Católica won. It was also González's first Primera División win after previously finishing second in the 2002 Clausura.

González signed a new one-year deal with Católica for the 2015–16 season.

=== Sport Recife ===
On 4 January 2016, González rescinded his contract at Universidad Católica and joined Brazilian club Sport Recife for the next two years. He made his debut on the 31st, playing the full 90 minutes as they lost 1–0 at Salgueiro Atlético Clube in the 2016 Campeonato Pernambucano first match of the year. He played only one more game before being sidelined for a month by a thigh injury, and totalled seven appearances as they finished runners-up to Santa Cruz.

González made his Campeonato Brasileiro Série A debut on 14 May as his team began the season with a 1–0 loss at Flamengo; he was substituted after 49 minutes for Serginho.

=== Colo Colo ===
On 30 December 2016, González signed for Chilean club Colo Colo.

== International career ==
Born in South Africa, González was also eligible to play for that country, but he chose Chile instead.

On 21 June 2010, González scored the only goal of the game for Chile against Switzerland during the group stage of the 2010 FIFA World Cup in his birthplace South Africa, heading in a cross from Esteban Paredes.

He was named in the preliminary squad for the 2015 Copa America but was omitted from the final squad. The following year he was not initially named in Chile's Copa América Centenario squad, but was called up when Matías Fernández withdrew through injury. Chile went on to win the tournament.

=== International goals ===
Scores and results list Chile's goal tally first.

#	Date	Venue	Opponent	Score	Result	Competition
1.	11 June 2003	Estadio Olímpico Metropolitano, San Pedro Sula, Honduras	Honduras	1–1	2–1	Friendly
2.	30 March 2004	Estadio Hernando Siles, La Paz, Bolivia	Bolivia	2–0	2–0	FIFA World Cup qualifier
3.	9 February 2005	Estadio Sausalito, Viña del Mar, Chile	Ecuador	1–0	3–0	Friendly
4.	21 June 2010	Nelson Mandela Bay Stadium, Port Elizabeth, South Africa	Switzerland	1–0	1–0	2010 World Cup
5.	28 January 2015	Estadio El Teniente, Rancagua, Chile	United States	2–2	3–2	Friendly
6.	28 January 2015	Estadio El Teniente, Rancagua, Chile	United States	3–2	3–2	Friendly

== Post-retirement ==
From 2019 to 2021, González participated as a panelist in the TV program Abrazo de Gol (Goal hug) from Canal del Fútbol (CDF).

González has participated in matches for the Liverpool Legends squad.

In December 2024, González graduated as a football manager at INAF (National Institute of Football, Sports and Physical Activity of Chile).

In August 2025, González joined the Chile national team for the Influencers World Cup Johor 2025 in Malaysia.

== Personal life ==
He is the son of the former Chile international footballer Raúl González as well as the brother of the actor and football agent Raúl Hoffmann. From his maternal line, he is the grandnephew of the former Chile international footballers Carlos Hoffmann and Reynaldo Hoffmann, as well as the cousin-nephew of the also former footballers Reinaldo and Alejandro, sons of Reynaldo.

González began dating Chilean television personality and model Maura Rivera in 2008, and they married in 2010. They have one son, Mark González Jr. In 2015, they welcome their daughter Luciana González.

In March 2021, González suffered from mild pericarditis, which was treated successfully and he made a full recovery.

== Honours ==
=== Club ===
Liverpool

- FA Community Shield: 2006
- UEFA Champions League runner-up: 2006–07

CSKA

- Russian Premier League: 2012–13, 2013–14
- Russian Cup: 2010–11, 2012–13
- Russian Super Cup: 2013

=== International ===
Chile

- Copa América: 2016

=== Individual ===
- In the list of 33 best football players of the championship of Russia: 2010
