= 1977 Copa Chile =

Tournament details
- Country: Chile

The 1977 Copa Chile was the eighth edition of the Chilean Cup tournament. The competition started on February 6, 1977, and concluded on April 9, 1977. Palestino won the competition for their second time, beating Unión Española 4–3 on the final.

== Calendar ==
Round	Date
Group Round	6 February 1977; 19 March 1977
Quarterfinals	23–27 March 1977
Semi-finals	31 March 1977; 3 April 1977
Final	9 April 1977

== Group Round ==
Key to colours in group tables
Teams that progressed to the second round

=== Group 1 ===
	UCHI	DLIN	RANG	AVIA
U. de Chile		2–1	1–0	3–0
D. Linares	0–3		1–0	0–4
Rangers	3–0	0–1		0–1
Aviación	3–3	4–2	2–2	

Rank	Team	Points
1	Universidad de Chile	9
2	Aviación	8
3	Deportes Linares	4
4	Rangers	3

=== Group 2 ===
	COLO	UCAT	OHIG	SANU	MAGA
Colo-Colo		0–0	3–2	4–1	1–0
U. Católica	1–1		0–0	4–2	1–1
O'Higgins	2–2	1–1		2–1	1–0
San Antonio U.	0–3	0–4	1–1		1–0
Magallanes	2–3	1–5	1–0	1–1	

Rank	Team	Points
1	Colo-Colo	13
2	Universidad Católica	11
3	O'Higgins	8
4	Magallanes	4 (-7)
5	San Antonio Unido	4 (-12)

=== Group 3 ===
	PALE	AUDI	TRAS	USFE
Palestino		5–1	3–0	3–1
Audax I.	0–1		3–0	2–1
Trasandino	1–3	1–2		1–0
U. San Felipe	1–2	1–1	3–4	

Rank	Team	Points
1	Palestino	12
2	Audax Italiano	7
3	Trasandino	4
4	Unión San Felipe	1

=== Group 4 ===
	DANT	CLOA	DLSE	COQU	DOVA
D. Antofagasta		2–2	2–1	6–3	0–2
Cobreloa	2–0		0–1	4–1	2–1
D. La Serena	5–2	1–0		1–4	2–2
Coquimbo U.	4–5	1–2	3–2		1–1
D. Ovalle	3–1	3–1	3–3	1–1	

Rank	Team	Points
1	Deportes Ovalle	10
2	Cobreloa	9
3	Deportes La Serena	8
4	Deportes Antofagasta	7
5	Coquimbo Unido	6

=== Group 5 ===
	LOTA	NAVA	HUAC	DCON
Lota S.		1–2	0–1	2–0
Naval	0–0		1–3	0–1
Huachipato	2–1	0–1		1–1
D. Concepción	1–1	2–1	2–1	

Rank	Team	Points
1	Deportes Concepción	8
2	Huachipato	7
3	Naval	5
4	Lota Schwager	4

=== Group 6 ===
	ÑUBL	GCRT	INDC	IBER	MALL
Ñublense		3–1	3–0	4–1	1–0
Green Cross T.	1–2		2–0	3–0	4–1
Independiente	4–2	2–3		1–2	3–1
Iberia B.B.	1–6	3–0	0–4		1–4
Malleco U.	3–1	3–1	2–0	2–0	

Rank	Team	Points
1	Ñublense	12
2	Malleco Unido	10
3	Green Cross Temuco	8
4	Independiente	6
5	Iberia Bio Bío	4

=== Group 7 ===
	UESP	SMOR	CURI	DCOL	FERR
U. Española		2–0	2–1	4–0	0–4
S. Morning	2–4		3–0	0–1	1–0
Curicó U.	1–1	3–1		2–4	5–1
D. Colchagua	2–3	0–3	1–2		1–2
Ferroviarios	2–2	1–2	2–2	3–3	

Rank	Team	Points
1	Unión Española	12
2	Curicó Unido	8 (GF:16)
3	Santiago Morning	8 (GF:12)
4	Ferroviarios	7
5	Deportes Colchagua	5

=== Group 8 ===
	SWAN	EVER	SLUI	ULCA
S. Wanderers		1–2	5–1	3–0
Everton	1–0		6–0	5–1
San Luis	2–5	0–2		3–1
U. La Calera	1–0	0–1	0–2	

Rank	Team	Points
1	Everton	12
2	Santiago Wanderers	6
3	San Luis	4
4	Unión La Calera	2

== Quarterfinals ==
Team 1	Agg.	Team 2	1st leg	2nd leg
Ñublense	2–3	Deportes Concepción	2–0	0–3
Everton	2–2 (ct)	Unión Española	1–0	1–2
Colo-Colo	3–1	Universidad de Chile	0–0	3–1
Palestino	5–4	Deportes Ovalle	2–1	3–3

== Semifinals ==
March 31, 1977

Deportes Concepción	2 – 2	Unión Española
Landeros 35'; Díaz 85'		8' Ponce; 15' González

Estadio Regional, Concepción
Attendance: 9,555
Referee: M. Lira

March 31, 1977

Palestino	1 – 0	Colo-Colo
Hidalgo 20'

Estadio Nacional, Santiago
Attendance: 9,368
Referee: J. Silvagno

April 3, 1977

Unión Española	2 – 1 (a.e.t.)	Deportes Concepción
Ponce 18'; Acevedo 100'		48' Landeros

Estadio Nacional, Santiago
Attendance: 31,967
Referee: J. Carvajal

April 3, 1977

Colo-Colo	1 – 4	Palestino
Díaz 79'		9' Figueroa; 37' Zelada; 55' Messen; 67' Fabbiani

Estadio Nacional, Santiago
Attendance: 31,967
Referee: A. Martínez

== Final ==
April 9, 1977

Palestino	4 – 3 (a.e.t.)	Unión Española
Zamora 67'; Messen 79'; Fabbiani 89'; Figueroa 112'		45' Ponce; 78', 80' Peredo

Estadio Nacional, Santiago
Attendance: 33,878
Referee: Néstor Mondría

== Top goalscorer ==
- Oscar Fabbiani (Palestino) 11 goals

== See also ==
- 1977 Campeonato Nacional
- Primera B
