= Óscar Fabbiani =

Argentine-Chilean footballer (born 1950)

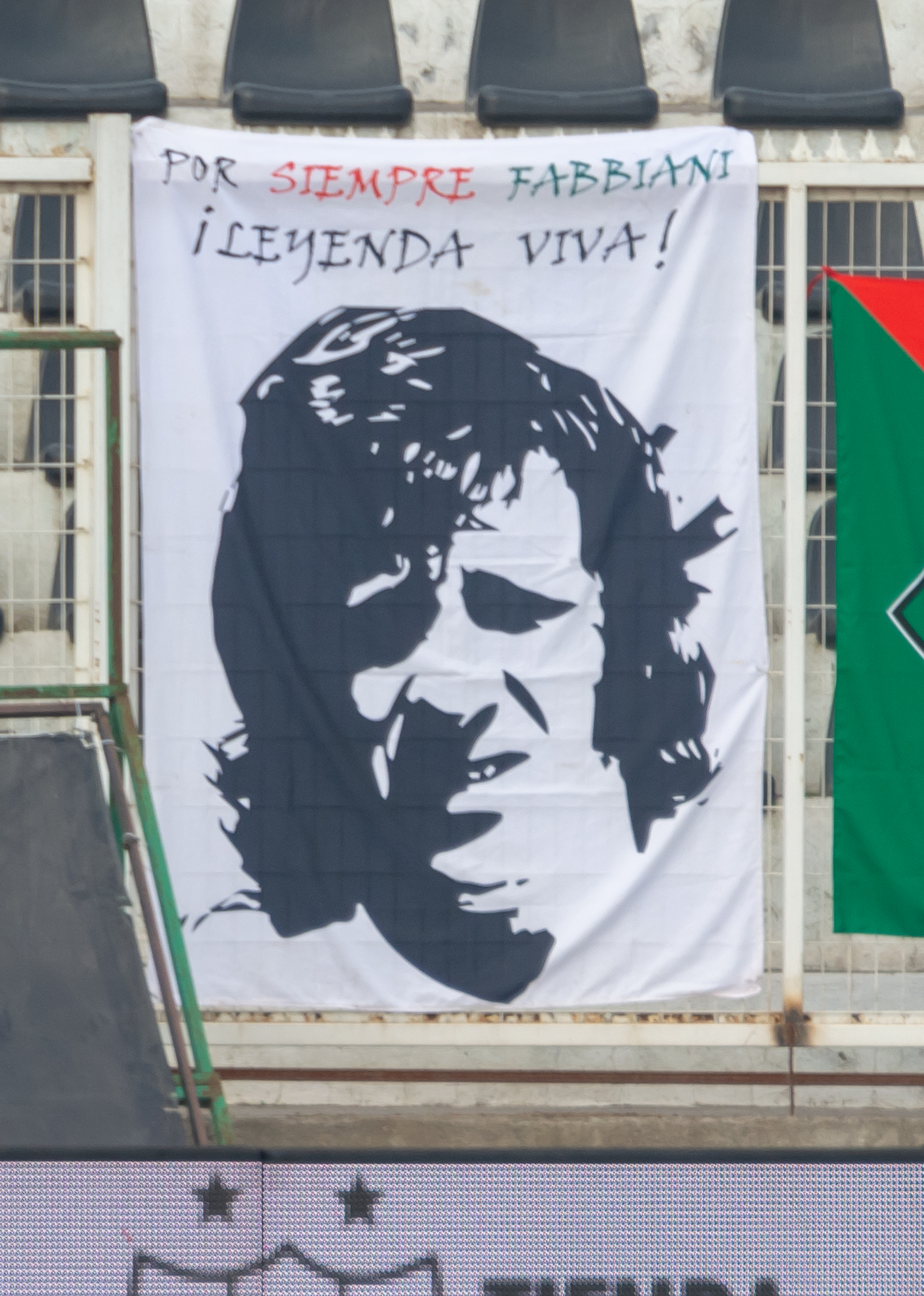
- A banner depicting Óscar Fabbiani

Personal information
- Full name: Óscar Roberto Fabbiani Venturelli
- Date of birth: 17 December 1950 (age 75)
- Place of birth: Buenos Aires, Argentina
- Height: 1.77 m (5 ft 10 in)
- Position: Striker

Senior career*
Years	Team	Apps	(Gls)
1968–1971	JJ Urquiza	7	(2)
1972	San Martín Tucumán	10	(1)
1973	Estudiantes BA	20	(3)
1974	Unión San Felipe	0	(0)
1974–1978	Palestino	155	(125)
1979–1981	Tampa Bay Rowdies	55	(40)
1979–1981	Tampa Bay Rowdies (indoor)	20	(37)
1981	Everton	21	(7)
1982	Palestino	5	(3)
1983	Unión San Felipe	33	(16)
1984	Deportes Iquique	18	(5)
1985	Cape Town Spurs	9	(1)
1986	Dallas Sidekicks	11	(2)
1986–1987	Palestino	58	(18)
1988	Coquimbo Unido	13	(3)
1989	Soinca Bata		
1990–1991	San Luis		
1991–1992	San Antonio Unido		

International career
1976–1981	Chile	6	(0)

Managerial career
- 1992: San Antonio Unido
- * Club domestic league appearances and goals

Óscar Roberto Fabbiani Venturelli (born 17 December 1950 in Buenos Aires) is a former professional footballer who played as a striker. Born in Argentina, he played international football for the Chile national team. Fabbiani was three times topscorer in the Chilean league with Palestino and was the leading scorer in the North American Soccer League for the Tampa Bay Rowdies in 1979. Fabbiani comes from a family of footballers, he has 13 relatives who were professional footballers, including a nephew, Cristian Fabbiani.

== In politics ==
As a member of National Renewal, Fabbiani was a elected councillor for Recoleta commune in 1992 and was a candidate to Alcalde in 1996.

== Honours ==
Palestino

- Primera División de Chile: 1978
- Copa Chile: 1975, 1977

Individual

- Primera División de Chile Top Scorer: 1976, 1977, 1978
- NASL Top Scorer: 1979
