= 1978 Campeonato Nacional Primera División =

Campeonato Nacional 1978
- Dates: 4 March 1978 – 26 November 1978
- Champions: Palestino (2nd title)
- Relegated: Huachipato; Rangers
- 1979 Copa Libertadores: Palestino; O'Higgins
- Matches: 306
- Goals: 846 (2.76 per match)
- Top goalscorer: Oscar Fabbiani (35 goals)
- Biggest home win: Palestino 7–0 Huachipato (9 July)
- Highest attendance: 57,153 Colo-Colo 1–0 Unión Española (21 May)
- Total attendance: 1,861,967
- Average attendance: 6,085

The 1978 Campeonato Nacional was Chilean first tier's 46th season. Palestino was the tournament's champion, winning its second title.

== Standings ==
Pos	Team	Pld	W	D	L	GF	GA	GD	Pts	Qualification or relegation
1	Palestino	34	23	7	4	73	32	+41	53	Champions & qualified to 1979 Copa Libertadores
2	Cobreloa	34	22	5	7	69	37	+32	49	Qualified to Liguilla Pre-Copa Libertadores
3	O'Higgins	34	17	8	9	64	39	+25	42	Qualified to Liguilla Pre-Copa Libertadores
4	Unión Española	34	17	7	10	52	41	+11	41	Qualified to Liguilla Pre-Copa Libertadores
5	Everton	34	14	12	8	55	40	+15	40	Qualified to Liguilla Pre-Copa Libertadores
6	Colo-Colo	34	15	7	12	62	55	+7	37	
7	Universidad de Chile	34	11	14	9	41	33	+8	36	
8	Aviación	34	12	10	12	51	51	0	34	
9	Universidad Católica	34	11	11	12	43	37	+6	33	
10	Deportes Concepción	34	12	9	13	44	47	−3	33	
11	Lota Schwager	34	9	15	10	33	42	−9	33	
12	Audax Italiano	34	10	12	12	36	39	−3	32	
13	Green Cross Temuco	34	10	12	12	52	57	−5	32	
14	Santiago Morning	34	10	12	12	43	49	−6	32	
15	Ñublense	34	10	10	14	34	49	−15	30	To promotion/relegation playoffs
16	Coquimbo Unido	34	8	8	18	38	56	−18	24	To promotion/relegation playoffs
17	Huachipato	34	5	7	22	26	55	−29	17	Relegated to Segunda División
18	Rangers	34	5	4	25	27	84	−57	14	Relegated to Segunda División

Campeonato Nacional
1978 champions
Palestino
2nd title

== Results ==
Home \ Away	AUD	AVI	CLO	COL	DCO	COQ	EVE	GCT	HUA	LOT	ÑUB	OHI	PAL	RAN	SMO	UCA	UCH	UES
Audax		0–1	0–1	2–4	1–1	2–0	1–0	1–1	1–0	2–1	1–0	3–1	1–1	0–1	0–2	1–1	1–1	0–0
Aviación	1–0		1–2	1–2	4–2	3–1	2–2	1–1	2–1	3–2	1–1	2–1	2–3	3–1	0–0	2–0	1–1	1–2
Cobreloa	2–1	3–0		4–2	2–0	4–2	2–1	4–2	3–1	3–0	1–2	0–0	3–2	5–0	2–0	1–0	4–1	2–3
Colo-Colo	0–2	2–1	2–2		2–1	1–3	1–1	3–1	2–0	3–1	6–2	3–4	1–3	3–0	1–3	0–0	3–2	1–0
Concepción	0–0	2–1	5–2	1–0		1–1	1–1	2–1	2–1	2–0	1–0	1–0	0–0	2–3	5–1	0–2	1–1	1–3
Coquimbo	3–2	1–1	1–0	3–1	2–2		1–2	4–2	1–1	1–2	1–0	2–1	1–2	0–0	1–4	0–1	0–0	0–1
Everton	4–0	3–3	1–1	2–2	1–2	1–0		1–1	1–0	3–1	2–0	1–0	1–3	3–1	5–0	1–1	0–0	5–2
Green Cross T.	2–2	3–1	0–1	3–2	2–0	3–1	2–4		0–0	0–0	6–3	2–2	0–1	2–0	0–1	1–0	2–2	1–1
Huachipato	1–0	1–0	0–1	0–0	2–3	1–0	1–1	1–1		1–1	1–3	1–2	1–2	4–2	0–1	0–0	0–1	0–3
Lota S.	1–1	0–0	1–2	0–0	0–0	3–2	1–1	1–1	1–0		1–1	2–2	0–0	1–0 (Note: Game was awarded to Lota Schwager, but just a 1-0 win, as a result of Rangers fielding an amateur squad. The match originally ended 14-1.)	0–0	1–0	0–1	1–1
Ñublense	1–2	1–0	0–0	2–1	1–1	1–0	1–0	1–1	2–1	0–1		0–3	0–2	3–0	1–1	0–0	1–0	0–2
O'Higgins	0–1	2–4	2–1	4–2	2–1	4–0	2–0	4–0	3–0	1–1	4–0		1–0 (Note: Game was awarded to O'Higgins' 1-0 win as a result of Palestino fielding an ineligible player. The match originally ended 0-1.)	5–1	1–1	1–0	2–2	3–0
Palestino	2–0	3–1	3–2	2–0	4–2	1–2	4–1	1–0	7–0	2–2	2–1	1–1		6–0	3–2	0–0	1–1	1–0
Rangers	1–5	0–0	3–1	0–2	2–0	1–1	0–2	2–3	1–5	0–1	1–1	1–2	1–2		1–3	0–1	0–1	2–5
S. Morning	2–2	1–2	0–0	2–5	0–1	1–1	0–1	3–2	4–1	1–3	1–1	0–0	1–4	1–2		1–0	0–0	1–3
U. Católica	2–0	4–2	0–5	1–2	3–1	1–0	2–2	2–3	2–0	3–0	2–3	2–1	2–3	6–0	1–1		1–1	2–3
U. de Chile	0–0	2–3	1–2	1–1	1–0	3–1	0–2	0–1	1–0	4–0	2–0	3–1	0–1	3–0	1–1	1–1		3–1
U. Española	1–1	1–1	0–1	0–2	1–0	3–1	2–0	5–2	1–0	1–3	1–1	1–2	2–1	2–0	0–2	1–0	1–0	

Legend: Blue = home team win; Yellow = draw; Red = away team win.

== Topscorer ==
Name	Team	Goals
(Argentina) Oscar Fabbiani	Palestino	35

== Liguilla Pre-Copa Libertadores ==
3 December 1978	Everton	1 – 0	O'Higgins	Estadio Nacional, Santiago
	Benzi 10'			Attendance: 16,724; Referee: J. Silvagno

3 December 1978	Unión Española	2 – 1	Cobreloa	Estadio Nacional, Santiago
	Véliz 20'; R. González 90'		70' Concha	Attendance: 16,724; Referee: R. Hormazábal

7 December 1978	O'Higgins	2 – 1	Cobreloa	Estadio Nacional, Santiago
	Guajardo 29'; Droguett 46'		35' (pen.) Yávar	Attendance: 12,402; Referee: G. Castro

7 December 1978	Unión Española	2 – 0	Everton	Estadio Nacional, Santiago
	Palacios 26'; Las Heras 90'			Attendance: 12,402; Referee: M. Lira

10 December 1978	Everton	1 – 1	Cobreloa	Estadio Nacional, Santiago
	Ahumada 56'		46' Own-goal	Attendance: 14,999; Referee: A. Martínez

10 December 1978	Unión Española	0 – 1	O'Higgins	Estadio Nacional, Santiago
			79' Vargas	Attendance: 14,999; Referee: N. Mondría

Pos	Team	Pld	W	D	L	GF	GA	GD	Pts	Qualification
1	Unión Española	3	2	0	1	4	2	+2	4	Qualified to Liguilla play-off match
2	O'Higgins	3	2	0	1	3	2	+1	4	Qualified to Liguilla play-off match
3	Everton	3	1	1	1	2	3	−1	3	
4	Cobreloa	3	0	1	2	3	5	−2	1	

=== Liguilla play-off match ===
12 December 1978	Unión Española	2 – 2 (a.e.t.)	O'Higgins	Estadio Nacional, Santiago
	Escobar 68'; Miranda 98'		24' Serrano; 119' Vargas	Attendance: 20,542; Referee: Mario Lira

O'Higgins qualified to 1979 Copa Libertadores due to its better League position

== Promotion/relegation Liguilla ==
Pos	Team	Pld	W	D	L	GF	GA	GD	Pts
1	Coquimbo Unido	3	2	1	0	9	6	+3	5
2	Ñublense	3	2	0	1	7	5	+2	4
3	Deportes Ovalle	3	0	2	1	6	8	−2	2
4	Magallanes	3	0	1	2	5	8	−3	1

Source: rsssf.com

* There was no promotion or relegation.
