= Elías Figueroa =

Chilean footballer (born 1946)

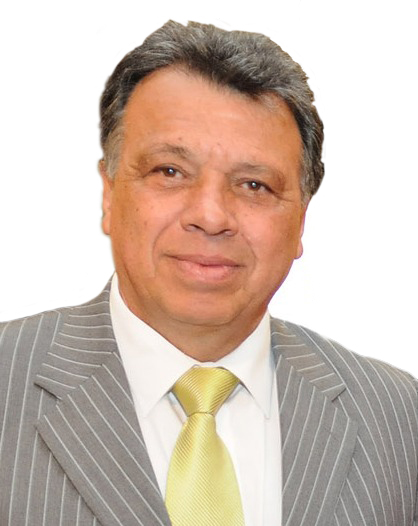
- Figueroa in 2011

Personal information
- Full name: Elías Ricardo Figueroa Brander
- Date of birth: 25 October 1946 (age 79)
- Place of birth: Valparaíso, Chile
- Height: 1.83 m (6 ft 0 in)
- Position: Centre-back

Youth career
- Deportivo Alto Florida
- Deportivo Liceo
- 1962–1964: Santiago Wanderers

Senior career*
Years	Team	Apps	(Gls)
1964–1966	Santiago Wanderers	54	(0)
1964	→ Unión La Calera (loan)	30	(0)
1967–1972	Peñarol	214	(7)
1972–1976	Internacional	336	(27)
1977–1980	Palestino	118	(6)
1981	Fort Lauderdale Strikers	22	(0)
1981–1982	Colo-Colo	17	(0)
Total		791	(40)

International career
1966–1982	Chile	47	(3)

Managerial career
- 1993: Santiago Wanderers
- 1994–1995: Palestino
- 1996: Internacional
Medal record
Player
Peñarol
Winner	Uruguayan Primera División	1967
Winner	Uruguayan Primera División	1968
Winner	Supercopa de Campeones Intercontinentales	1969
Internacional
Winner	Campeonato Gaúcho	1972
Winner	Campeonato Gaúcho	1973
Winner	Campeonato Gaúcho	1974
Winner	Campeonato Brasileiro	1975
Winner	Campeonato Gaúcho	1975
Winner	Campeonato Brasileiro	1976
Winner	Campeonato Gaúcho	1976
Palestino
Winner	Copa Chile	1977
Winner	Chilean Primera Division	1978
- * Club domestic league appearances and goals

Elías Ricardo Figueroa Brander (born 25 October 1946) is a Chilean former footballer who played for several clubs during his career, notably his hometown club Santiago Wanderers, Brazilian club Internacional and Uruguayan club Peñarol. He also represented Chile 47 times, appearing in three FIFA World Cups, in 1966, 1974, and 1982. He is widely regarded as the greatest Chilean football player of all time and as one of the greatest defenders in football history.

Figueroa was noted for his elegant style of play, his composure in the centre of defense and his ability to cut out opposition attacks and immediately launch counterattacks from the back with his passing. He was also praised throughout his career for being a gentleman on and off the pitch.

He was awarded the South American Footballer of the Year three times in a row by Venezuelan newspaper El Mundo in 1974, 1975 and 1976. He was also twice awarded the Bola de Ouro, the Brazilian Player of the year award whilst playing for Internacional in 1972 and 1976. He was named Best Player in Uruguay in 1967 and 1968, and Best Player in Chile in 1977 and 1978. After retiring, he was named one of the world's 125 best living football players by Pelé in 2004, and was also voted 8th best South American and 37th best player in the world of the 20th Century by the IFFHS in 1999.

== Early life and youth career ==
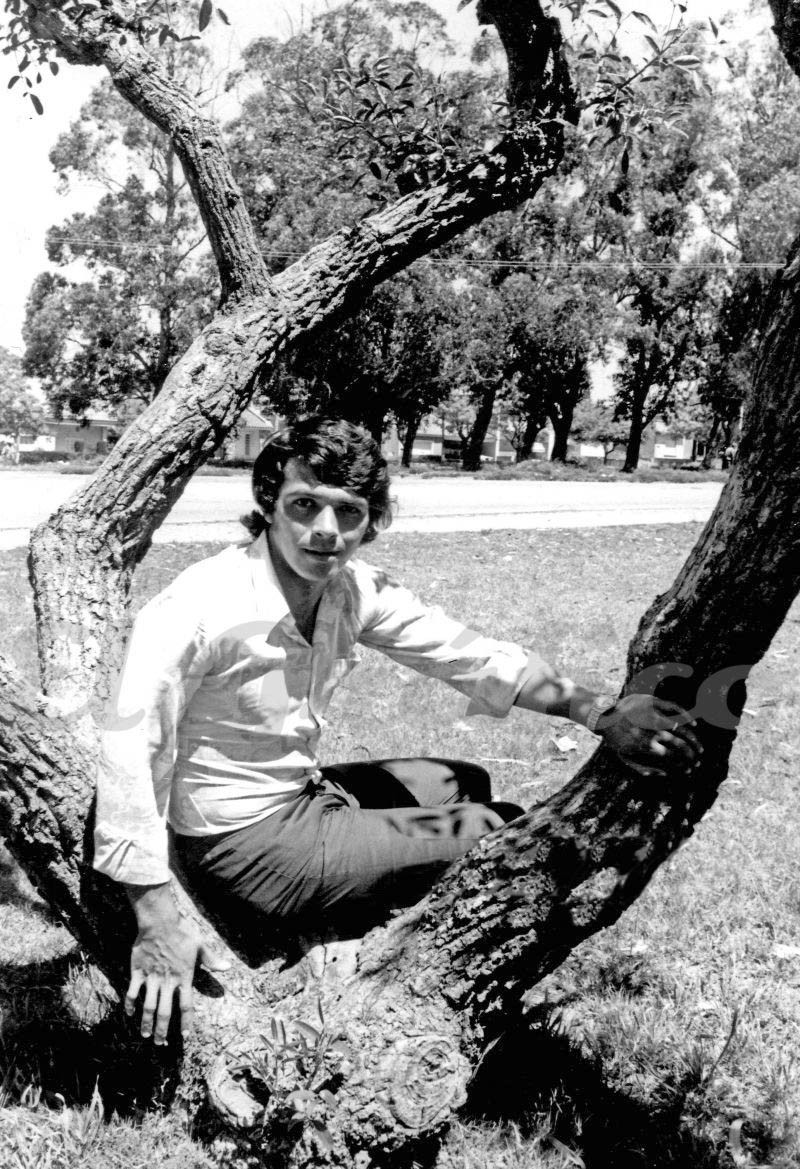
Figueroa in the mid-1970s

Figueroa was born in Valparaíso, Chile on 25 October 1946. He began playing football in Chile with Deportivo Alto Florida and Deportivo Liceo from Quilpué, and later joined the youth system of his hometown club Santiago Wanderers in 1962.

== Club career ==
=== Early career in Chile ===
Figueroa began his professional career in 1963, when, at the age of 16, he appeared in the first division of the Chilean professional football league, playing for the Santiago Wanderers first team. He was later sent on loan to Unión La Calera in 1964. Later that year, aged 17, he was called up to the Chile national youth team.

=== Success with Peñarol ===
His performances attracted interest from several foreign teams, and following the South American Championship in Montevideo in 1967, he was acquired by Uruguayan side Peñarol later that year. At that time this Uruguayan Club was the best team in the world as champion of the Intercontinental Cup (football) and the Uruguayan league was very strong. Figueroa settled in a team full of stars and legends, but he with 18 years was elected the best player in the Uruguayan Championship 1967 and also 1968 and 1971. He spent several years with the Peñarol, where he experienced one of his most successful periods in domestic football. He won the Uruguayan Championship with the club in 1967, 1968 and 1969 and in his farewell at the end of 1971, people cried at the airport.

=== Continued success with Internacional ===
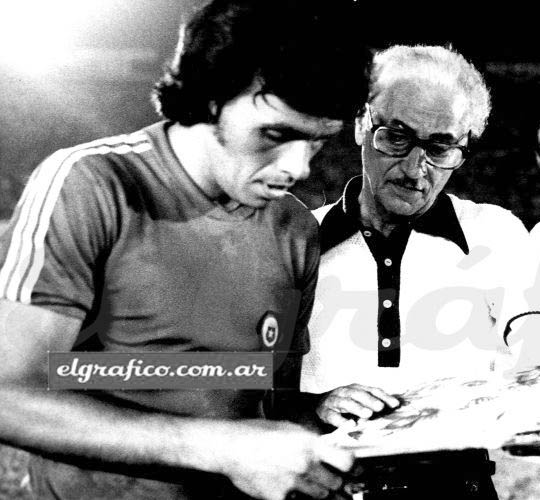
Figueroa with the Chile national team before playing Ecuador in 1977

By then Figueroa had established himself as a well-developed and highly regarded athlete; however, he was looking to develop his skills further, and his talents caught the attention of Brazilian executives. He was acquired by Brazilian club Internacional de Porto Alegre in 1972, where he had an equally successful spell, winning the Brazilian championship in 1975 and 1976, and also winning five Campeonato Gaúcho Championships with the team; in 1974, the club won all of their 18 games to claim the title. Elias Figueroa was the central figure of the team, and is well remembered by the club's fans for his famous "Illuminated goal" in the club's victory over Cruzeiro in the 1975 "Brasileirao" final, so called because, as the clouds moved to block the sun at that moment, the only streak of sunlight to crack through lit the exact spot from which he headed the ball into the goal. He was elected the Brazilian league's best central defender during the 1973, 1974, 1975 and 1976 seasons, winning the Bola de Prata, and was voted the Brazilian League's Player of the Year in 1975 and 1976, winning the Bola de Ouro Award. He won further acclaim when he succeeded Pelé in being named the South American Footballer of the Year in 1974, 1975 and 1976, fighting off competition from several other world class South American footballers, such as his teammate Falcão, as well as Rivellino, Jairzinho, Carlos Alberto Torres, Zico, Nelinho, Marinho Chagas, Teófilo Cubillas, Héctor Chumpitaz, Mario Kempes, Roberto Perfumo, and Daniel Passarella.

=== Later career in Chile and the United States ===
Shortly after his time in Brazil, Figueroa returned to his homeland in 1977, joining Palestino, with whom he won the Chile National Championship in 1977 and 1978, also being named the Best Player in Chile in both of those seasons. Like many prominent ageing figures in world football at the time, in 1981 he went to the United States, where he played in the North American Soccer League for the Fort Lauderdale Strikers. Finally, he returned to Chile once again later that year, transferring to Colo-Colo in Santiago, where he ended his career. In 1982, after a 20-year career, he officially retired from professional football. In total he amassed an impressive 22 titles.

== International career ==
Figueroa earned 47 caps and scored two goals for the Chilean senior national team between 1966 and 1982.

He was the captain of the Chile national side on many occasions, and even captained the Chilean squad through their most successive era to date, when they qualified for three World Cups. He played in the 1966 FIFA World Cup in England, and also featured prominently in the 1974 FIFA World Cup in Germany, where he was elected the best central defender of the tournament, despite Chile's poor performance in the competition. He also later took part in the 1982 FIFA World Cup in Spain. In 1974 Figueroa was elected as a member of the all-star team of World Cup.

He was also captain when they finished third in the South American Championship 1967 and a remarkable second place in the Copa América 1979.

== Playing style ==
Known as "Don Elías", Figueroa was noted for having a keen ability to anticipate attacks as a defender with his great reading of the game and tight marking ability. Figueroa also had the ability to start counter-attacks from the back-line thanks to his composure on the ball, vision, and good range of passing. His playing style as a sweeper was frequently compared to Franz Beckenbauer, but while the German often looked for long, killer balls upfield, Figueroa typically used shorter, incisive passes to spring his teammates forward. Figueroa was also a threat in the final third of the pitch, often marauding forward to lay on goals for other players or strike on goal with his powerful shot. Figueroa remembers: "when I played in Brazil, I always did a play in which the wing back and the winger retained the ball while I would advance unmarked and make a central attacking run". Possessing good technical skills, Figueroa was also a physical presence, good in the air, and strong in one-on-one situations as a central defender. Known for his leadership, he also had a reputation of being a clean and fair player. Only once in his entire career was he shown a red card and was selected as captain for every team he played for. According to journalist Nelson Rodrigues, Figueroa was "elegant, as an earl dressed in suit, and dangerous as a Bengal Tiger. Elias Figueroa was the perfect defender."

== After retirement ==
=== Punditry ===
After retiring, Figueroa later became a television sports commentator for Chilean and Brazilian football, and was also successful in his new profession.

=== Coaching career ===
In December 2006, Figueroa served as coach when Chile played a friendly game against Aragon.

=== Potential FIFA Presidential Run ===
On 25 March 2011, Figueroa was chosen as ChangeFIFA's candidate to clean up FIFA following the scandal-hit 2018 and 2022 World Cup bid race last year. Unless Figueroa is nominated by a national federation, FIFA president Sepp Blatter's only opponent in the elections on 1 June will be Asian football chief Mohamed Bin Hammam. ChangeFIFA co-director David Larkin said that if FIFA members denied one of their own legendary players the right to stand for president, "it will only prove to show that FIFA has become an exclusive and undemocratic club of an elite few who will stop at nothing to prevent their loss of privilege and power". Figueroa told Brazil's leading sports newspaper, Lance!: "My idea, which is also theirs, is to change some things in football, make it better. I still cannot give details, but, if the nomination is confirmed, we will reveal."

However, on 31 March 2011, Figueroa said in a statement he had decided not to accept because "in such a short period of time I could not develop a case worthy of the magnitude and importance of such a distinguished job".

== Legacy ==
In 1999 Figueroa received the honorable mention of being one of the top eleven players from Latin America and in the same year he was part of a select group of the Great Masters Cup in a ceremony held in Cannes, France.

His time playing in Brazil was so successful that some local journalists divided his career in the South American nation "before and after Figueroa." Single lineage heads the list of all Chilean players to date.

== Honours ==
Peñarol

- Primera División: 1967, 1968
- Intercontinental Champions' Supercup: 1969
- Copa Libertadores runner-up: 1970

Internacional

- Campeonato Gaúcho: 1971, 1972, 1973, 1974, 1975, 1976
- Campeonato Brasileiro Série A: 1975, 1976

Palestino

- Copa Chile: 1977
- Primera División: 1978

Chile

- Copa América runner-up: 1979

Individual

Distinctions	Year
All-Star Team of 1974 FIFA World Cup Best defense of the tournament	1974
South American Footballer of the Year	1974, 1975, 1976
Third place South American Footballer of the Year	1977
Best South American defense of the year	1972, 1973, 1974, 1975, 1976, 1977
Best global defense of the year	1974, 1975, 1976, 1977
Bola de Ouro Brazil's best player	1972, 1976
Bola de Prata Brazil's best defense of the year	1972, 1974, 1975, 1976
Best player of Uruguay	1967, 1968, 1971
Best foreigner player of the century in Brazil	2001
Best foreigner player of the century in Uruguay	2000
Best footballer of the year in Chile	1966, 1981
Best sportsman of the year of Chile	1981
Chilean Footballer of the History of Circle of Sports Journalists of Chile	1999
N° 37 The World's best Player of the Century IFFHS	1999/2000
N° 8 South America best Player of the Century IFFHS	1999/2000
N° 1 Chilean best Player of the Century IFFHS	1999/2000
N° 1 South America best Defender of the Century IFFHS	1999/2000
List FIFA 100 of Pelé	2004
Member of South American Team of the 20th Century	1999
Member of historical team by the American Cup	2011
Member of Dream Team of Peñarol of all time	2002
Member Bicentennial Team of Santiago Wanderers	2010
Most influential footballer in the history of Sport Club Internacional of Porto Alegre.	2012
Placar magazine (Brazil) N 19° in published a list of the best 100 players of all time	1999
Playboy Brazil magazine N 13° in published a list of voted among the best in history	2005
World Soccer magazine; selected in published a list of the best 50 players of all time	2010
Sports Illustrated Latino; Elected at the eleventh ideal of the past 50 years of South American football	2012
Distinction as Ambassador to the UN by the Sports Program for Development and Peace	2002
Distinction of the order "Knight of Rio Branco" granted by the Federative Republic of Brazil	2000
Award of CONMEBOL by exalt to South American soccer	2009
Member of the Walk of Fame Stadium Maracana	2000
Was nominated constantly to Selection of the World and South America from 19 years	1966–1982
Was only player alongside Hugo Sánchez that has participated in three World Cups alternately	1966– 1974- 1982
Sent off just once in 18-year career	1965–1983
Was captain in all teams where he played	1966–1982
IFFHS South America Men's Team of All Time	2021
Copa América Historical Dream Team	2011
TNT Sports Chile's Gala Crack - Legend Award	2024

== See also ==
- Bola de Prata
- Bolo de Ouro
- South American Footballer of the Year
- FIFA 100
- List of celebrities who own wineries and vineyards
