= List of South American association football families =

This is a list of association football families in South America. The countries are listed according to the national teams of the senior family member if the other family member played for a different country. If the senior members of the given member did not play international football, the family will be listed according to nationality (e.g., the Trézéguets).

Families included on the list must have

1. At least, one member of the family is capped by a national team on the senior level or is an important person in the game of football (e.g., notable coaches, referees, club chairmen, etc.)
2. A second member must be a professional player or capped by a national team on the senior level.

== Argentina ==
- Rodrigo Acosta, Lautaro Acosta (brother)
- Sergio Agüero, Mauricio del Castillo, Gastón del Castillo (brothers)
- Pablo Aimar, Andrés Aimar (brother)
- Sergio Almirón Sr., Sergio Almirón Jr. (son)
- Ricardo Altamirano, Lionel Altamirano (nephew)
- Nahuel Arrarte, (Timor-Leste) Tristan Arrarte (son)
- Julio Asad, Omar Asad (nephew), Yamil Asad (Omar's son)
- Angelo Badini, (Italy) Emilio Badini, Cesare Badini, Augusto Badini (brothers)
- Guillermo Barros Schelotto, Gustavo Barros Schelotto (twin brother)
- Marcelo Barticciotto, (Chile) Bruno Barticciotto (son)
- José Batista, Sergio Batista, Norberto Batista, Fernando Batista (sons)
- Delfín Benítez Cáceres (see Paraguay)
- Carlos Bianchi, Eduardo Domínguez (son-in-law)
- Maxi Biancucchi, Emanuel Biancucchi (brother), Lionel Messi (cousin), Lucas Scaglia (Lionel's cousin-in-law), (Spain) Bojan (Lionel's fourth cousin), (Socialist Federal Republic of Yugoslavia) Bojan Krkić (Bojan Jr.'s father)
- Cristian Biglia, Lucas Biglia (brother)
- Antonio Blanco, Eduardo Blanco (brother)
- Jonathan Bottinelli, Darío Bottinelli (brother)
- Jorge Brown, Carlos Brown, Ernesto Brown, Alfredo Brown, Eliseo Brown, Diego Brown, Tomás Brown (brothers), Juan Domingo Brown (cousin)
- José Luis Brown, Juan Ignacio Brown (son)
- Nicolás Burdisso, Guillermo Burdisso (brother)
- José Luis Calderón, Lucas Calderón (son)
- Nicolás Cambiasso, Esteban Cambiasso (brother)
- Pedro Canaveri, Zoilo Canavery (cousin)
- Mauro Cantoro, (Peru) Tiago Cantoro (son)
- Vladislao Cap, Jorge Borelli (son-in-law), (Mexico) Éder Borelli (grandson, son of Jorge)
- Jorge Davino, (Mexico) Flavio Davino, (Mexico) Duilio Davino (sons)
- Vicente de la Mata, Francisco de la Mata (brother)
- Manuel De Saa, (Chile) Eduardo De Saa (brother)
- Rodolfo De Zorzi, Emilio De Zorzi (brother)
- Attilio Demaría (see Italy)
- Leandro Desábato, Leandro Luis Desábato, Andrés Desábato (cousins, twins)
- Alfredo Di Stéfano (see (Italy) Alfredo Di Stefano Sr.)
- Juan Carlos Díaz, Daniel Díaz (brother)
- Roberto Díaz, Lautaro Díaz (son)
- Zenón Díaz, Juan Díaz (brother), Oscar Díaz (son), Octavio Díaz (nephew/Juan's son)
- Héctor Enrique, Carlos Enrique, Fernando Enrique, Ramiro Enrique (sons)
- Marcelo Espina, (Chile) Santiago Espina (son)
- Juan Evaristo, Mario Evaristo (brother)
- Néstor Fabbri, Jonathan Calleri (nephew)
- Victorio Faggiani, Ernesto Faggiani (brother)
- Adolfo Ferraresi, (Venezuela) Nahuel Ferraresi (son)
- Enzo Ferrero, Oscar Ferrero (brother)
- Lautaro Formica, Mauro Formica (brother)
- Darío Franco, Emiliano Franco (son)
- Ramiro Funes Mori, (Mexico) Rogelio Funes Mori (twin brother), Mauro Díaz (brother-in-law)
- Marcelo Gallardo, Nahuel Gallardo (son)
- Rubén Galletti, Luciano Galletti (son)
- Marcelino Galoppo, Giuliano Galoppo (son)
- Óscar Garré, Emiliano Garré, Ezequiel Garré (sons), Benjamín Garré (grandson, son of Emiliano)
- Daniel Gazzaniga, Paulo Gazzaniga, Gianfranco Gazzaniga (sons)
- Emmanuel Gigliotti, Sebastián Gigliotti (brother)
- Mariano González, Pablo González (brother)
- Carlos Griguol, Víctor Marchesini (son-in-law)
- Julio Grondona, Héctor Grondona (brother), Julio Ricardo Grondona, Humberto Grondona (sons), Gustavo Grondona (nephew), (Chile) Jaime Grondona (distant relative)
- Harry Hayes, Ennis Hayes (brother)
- Jorge Higuaín, Federico Higuaín, Gonzalo Higuaín (sons)
- Claudio Husaín, Darío Husaín (brother)
- Ariel Ibagaza, (Spain) Iago Ibagaza (son)
- Emiliano Insúa, Emanuel Insúa (brother)
- Luis Islas, Daniel Islas (brother), Pablo Islas (brother, twin of Daniel)
- Diego Klimowicz, (Ecuador) Javier Klimowicz, Nicolás Klimowicz (brothers), (Germany) Mateo Klimowicz (son), Luka Klimowicz (nephew/son of Javier)
- Ángel Labruna, Omar Labruna (son)
- Tomás Lanzini, Manuel Lanzini (brother)
- Giovani Lo Celso, Francesco Lo Celso (brother)
- Juan Carlos Loustau, Patricio Loustau (son)
- Luis Antonio Ludueña, Daniel Ludueña, Gonzalo Ludueña (sons)
- Javier Lux, Germán Lux (brother)
- Patricio Mac Allister, Carlos Mac Allister (brother), Francis Mac Allister, Kevin Mac Allister, Alexis Mac Allister (nephews, sons of Carlos)
- Alejandro Mancuso, Gianluca Mancuso (son)
- Diego Maradona, Raúl Maradona, Hugo Maradona (brothers), (Italy) Diego Sinagra (son), Sergio Agüero (son-in-law), Sergio Daniel López (nephew), (Spain) Diego Hernán Maradona, Jorge Raúl Maradona (nephews, sons of Raúl), Hernán López (great-nephew, son of Sergio Daniel)
- Gerardo Martino, Martín Luciano (nephew)
- Oscar Mas, Leonardo Mas (son)
- Cristian Menin, (San Marino) Yésica Menin (sister), (San Marino) Danilo Rinaldi, (San Marino) Federico Rinaldi (cousins)
- Diego Milito, Gabriel Milito (brother)
- Antonio Mohamed, Shayr Mohamed (son), Santiago Hezze (nephew)
- Ariel Montenegro, Daniel Montenegro (brother)
- Carlos Horacio Moreno, (Venezuela) Carlos Moreno, (Venezuela) Júnior Moreno, (Venezuela) Marcelo Moreno (sons)
- Francisco Mosso, Benito Mosso, (Italy) Eugenio Mosso, Julio Mosso (brothers)
- Ricardo Jorge Navarro, Rubén Montoya (brother-in-law), (Colombia) Carlos Navarro Montoya, (Peru) Edgar Navarro Montoya (sons), (Spain) Ezequiel Navarro Montoya (grandson/son of Carlos)
- Ermindo Onega, Daniel Onega (brother)
- Cesar Paiber, (Malta) Brandon Paiber (son)
- Rodrigo Palacio (see (Spain) José Ramón Palacio)
- Martín Palermo, Ryduan Palermo (son)
- Leandro Paredes, Franco Paredes (cousin)
- Gonzalo Pavone, Mariano Pavone (brother)
- Pablo Paz, Nico Paz (son)
- Juan Perinetti, Natalio Perinetti, Carlos Perinetti (brothers)
- Mauricio Pochettino, (Spain) Maurizio Pochettino (son)
- Nery Pumpido, Juan Pablo Pumpido (son)
- Sebastián Rambert (see (France) Ángel Rambert)
- Juan Román Riquelme, Sebastián Riquelme (brother)
- Leonardo Rodríguez, (Chile) Thomas Rodríguez (son)
- Maxi Rodríguez, Alexis Rodríguez, Denis Rodríguez (cousins/Denis & Alexis are twins)
- Atilio Romagnoli, Leandro Romagnoli (son)
- Diego Romero, Luka Romero (son)
- Alejandro Roncaglia, Facundo Roncaglia (brother)
- Oscar Ruggeri, Stephan Ruggeri (son)
- Miguel Ángel Russo, Ignacio Russo (son)
- Florencio Sarasíbar, Félix Sarasíbar (brother)
- Mauro Scaloni, Lionel Scaloni (brother)
- Héctor Scotta, (Spain) Valentino Fattore (grandson)
- Fabio Schiavi, Rolando Schiavi (brother)
- José Serrizuela, Juan José Serrizuela (brother)
- Diego Simeone, Giovanni Simeone, Gianluca Simeone, Giuliano Simeone (sons)
- Jorge Solari, Eduardo Solari (brother), Santiago Solari, Esteban Solari, (Colombia) David Solari (nephews, sons of Eduardo), Augusto Solari (grandson, cousin-nephew of Santiago and his bros), Fernando Redondo Solari, Federico Redondo (cousin-nephews of Santiago and his bros), Fernando Redondo (father of Fernando Jr. and Federico)
- Diego Soñora, (United States) Joel Soñora, (United States) Alan Soñora (sons)
- Gabino Sosa, Blas Sosa (brother)
- Matías Suárez, (United Arab Emirates) Gastón Álvarez Suárez (nephew), Federico Álvarez (nephew/cousin of Gastón)
- Maximiliano Susán, José Susán (brother)
- Alexander Szymanowski, Marianela Szymanowski (sister)
- George Tarantini, Alberto Tarantini (brother)
- Jorge Trezeguet, (France) David Trezeguet (son)
- Marcelo Trobbiani, Pablo Trobbiani (son)
- Juan Vairo, Federico Vairo (brother)
- Juan Ramón Verón, Juan Sebastián Verón, Iani Verón (sons), Deian Verón (grandson/son of Juan Sebastián), Pedro Verde (brother-in-law)
- Enrique Vidallé, Jonathan Vidallé (son)
- Arnold Watson Hutton (see (Scotland) Alexander Watson Hutton)
- Sergio Zanetti, Javier Zanetti (brother)
- Sergio Zárate, Ariel Zárate, Rolando Zárate, Mauro Zárate (brothers), Luca Zárate (nephew/son of Ariel), Tobías Zárate (nephew/son of Rolando)
- Juan Carlos Zubczuk, (Peru) Patrick Zubczuk (son)
- Franco Zuculini, Bruno Zuculini (brother)

== Bolivia ==
- Julio César Baldivieso, Mauricio Baldivieso (son)
- Diego Bejarano, Danny Bejarano (cousin)
- Ramiro Dalence, Martin Smedberg-Dalence (son)
- José Carlo Fernández, Genaro Fernández (brother), Cristian Fernández (son)
- Arturo Galarza, Luis Galarza, Sergio Galarza (see (Paraguay) Ramón Mayeregger)
- Ronald García, Ignacio García (brother)
- Limberg Gutiérrez Sr., Limberg Gutiérrez Jr. (son)
- Luis Liendo Sr., Luis Liendo Jr. (son)
- Marcelo Martins (see (Brazil) Mauro Martins)
- Milton Melgar, Milton Erick Melgar (son), Sebastián Melgar (grand-nephew)
- Ronaldo Monteiro, Enzo Monteiro (brother), (Brazil) Edu Monteiro (father)
- Emanuel Paniagua, Moisés Paniagua (brother)
- Álvaro Peña, José Peña (brother)
- Juan Manuel Peña, Adrián Peña (son)
- William Ramallo, Rodrigo Ramallo (son)
- Jesús Sagredo, José Sagredo (twin brother)
- Erwin Sánchez, Erwin Junior Sánchez (son)
- Marco Sandy, Daniel Sandy (son)
- Wilder Zabala, Leonardo Zabala (nephew)

== Brazil ==
- Aldo, Bira (brother)
- Allan Aal, Netinho (brother)
- Almir Pernambuquinho, Adílson, Ayres Morais de Albuquerque (brothers)
- Adalberto, (Spain) Rodrigo (son)
- Cláudio Adão, Felipe Adão (son)
- Adriano, Adriano (son)
- Alcindo, Alfeu, Kim (brothers)
- Magno Alves, Pedrinho (son)
- José Amoroso Filho, Márcio Amoroso (nephew)
- Marcos Assunção (see (Spain) Marcos Senna)
- Júnior Baiano, Jorginho Baiano (brother), Patrick (son)
- Nelsinho Baptista, Eduardo Baptista (son)
- Diego Barcelos, Diogo Barcelos (twin brother)
- Bazzani, Bazzaninho (brother), Olivério Bazzani (father)
- Bebeto, Mattheus (son)
- Bernardo, Bernardo Jr. (son)
- Bill, Bill (son)
- Matheus Biteco, Guilherme Biteco, Gabriel Biteco (brothers)
- Bolívar, Bolívar (son)
- Édson Bonifácio, Patrick Boni (son)
- Marcelo Bordon, Filipe Bordon, Ricardo Bordon (sons)
- Dulcídio Wanderley Boschilia (referee), Gabriel Boschilia (nephew)
- Brandão, Brandão (father)
- Petronilho de Brito, Waldemar de Brito (brother)
- Bruno, Bruninho Samudio (son)
- Camarão, Siriri (brother)
- Rodolfo Carbone, José Luiz Carbone (nephew), Rodrigo Carbone (José Luiz's son), João Carbone (José Luiz's grandson).
- Carlos Alberto, Fernando (brother)
- Leandro Castán, Luciano Castán (brother)
- César Maluco, Caio Cambalhota, Luisinho Lemos (brothers)
- Péricles Chamusca, Marcelo Chamusca (brother)
- Chiquinho Pastor, Cafuringa (brother)
- Claudinho, Mauricio Caprini (son)
- Cléo, Paulo Souza (brother)
- Cocada, Dito, Leba, Rudney, Müller (Edmur), Müller (brothers)
- Edu Coimbra, Zico (brother), Júnior Coimbra, Thiago Coimbra (nephews, sons of Zico), (Portugal) Eduardo Quaresma (distant relative)
- Ladislau da Guia, Domingos da Guia, Luiz Antônio da Guia, Mamede da Guia (brothers), Ademir da Guia (nephew/son of Domingos)
- Danilo, Matheus Gabriel, Lucas Gabriel (sons)
- Denílson, Paulo Vitor (brother)
- Djalma Dias, Djalminha (son)
- Nílson Dias, Nei Dias (brother)
- Dinei, Ney de Oliveira (father)
- Leandro Domingues, Kleiton Domingues (brother)
- Dondinho, Pelé (son), Zoca (son), Edinho, Joshua (grandsons, sons of Pelé), Octavio Felinto (great-grandson)
- Doni, João Paulo (brother)
- Douglas Rodrigues, Maycon Cardozo (son)
- Dudu, Dorival Júnior (nephew), Lucas Silvestre (son of Dorival Júnior)
- Duílio Dias, Duílio Júnior (son)
- Edmílson, (Qatar) Edmilson Junior
- Eric, Rodrygo (son)
- Fagner, Henrique Lemos (son)
- Fernando Ferretti, Tuca Ferretti, Bruno Ferretti (brothers)
- Roberto Firmino, (Spain) Selton Sánchez (cousin)
- Lucas Freitas, Luan Freitas (twin brother)
- Elisio Gabardo, Idilio Gabardo, Dibailo Gabardo, Hermenegildo Gabardo (brothers)
- Carlos Alberto Gambarotta, Guido Gambarotta (brother)
- Garrincha, Jimmy dos Santos (brother)
- Gatão, Gatãozinho (son)
- Almir Gil, Sérgio Gil, Tonho Gil (brothers)
- Gilson Gênio, Gilcimar (brother)
- Giovanni, (Italy) Emerson Palmieri (brother)
- Anfilogino Guarisi (see (Portugal) Manuel Augusto Marques)
- Luiz Imparato, Ernesto Imparato, Antônio Imparato, Caetano Imparato (brothers)
- Itaqui, Itaqui (brother), Itaqui (cousin)
- Léo Jabá, Leandro Lima (brother)
- Jairzinho, Jair Ventura (son)
- Jajá, Jajá (son)
- Jean, Jean (son)
- Jean Lucas, Dudu Figueiredo (brother)
- Jorge Leandro, Leanderson (son)
- Josimar, Josimar Júnior (son)
- Júlio César, Darci (brother)
- Juninho (born November 1989), Bruno Henrique (brother)
- Juninho (born January 1989), Ricardo Goulart (brother)
- Kaká, Digão (brother), Eduardo Delani (cousin)
- King, Teleco (brother)
- Kléber, Kaique Kenji (son)
- Rolando de Lamare, Abelardo de Lamare, Adhemaro de Lamare (brothers)
- Sebastião Lazaroni, Bruno Lazaroni (son)
- Leandro, Dedé, Cacá (brothers)
- Leivinha, Lucas Leiva (nephew)
- Lela, Alecsandro, Richarlyson (sons), (Portugal) Deco (Alecsandro's brother-in-law)
- Ludemar, Felipe (son)
- Luisão, Alex Silva, Andrei Silva (brothers)
- Luiz Alberto, Phillipe Gabriel (son)
- Luiz Phellype, Fabinho (brother)
- Gabriel Magalhães, Denner (cousin)
- Osmar Magalhães Sr., Osmar Magalhães, Paulo César (sons), Thiago Pereira, Rafael Magalhães (grandsons), (Chile) Paulo Magalhães (grandson/son of Osmar)
- Marcelo Pelé, Marcelinho, Jhon Jhon (sons)
- Marcelinho Carioca, Lucas Surcin, Matheus Surcin (sons), Marquinhos (nephew)
- Marcelo, (Spain) Enzo Alves (son)
- Marta, Geovany Soares (cousin)
- Lucas Paquetá, Matheus Paquetá (brother)
- Maurinho, Viriato (father)
- Mauro Martins, (Bolivia) Marcelo Martins (son)
- Maxambomba, Ninho (brother)
- Mazinho, (Spain) Thiago (son), Rafinha (son)
- Fernando Medeiros, Flávio Medeiros (twin brother)
- Isidoro Mendes, Sebastião Mendes (brother)
- Deoclécio Miranda, Donizete Miranda (brother)
- Miranda, João Vitor Miranda, Lucas Miranda (sons)
- Jorge Morgenstern, (Lebanon) Jadir Morgenstern (brother)
- Zezé Moreira, Aymoré Moreira, Ayrton Moreira (brothers)
- Muriel, Alisson Becker (brother)
- Neneca, Neneca (son)
- Neymar Sr., Neymar Jr. (son)
- Nílton Santos, Nílson Luiz (brother)
- Ninão, (Italy) Otávio Fantoni (cousin), Niginho, Orlando Fantoni (brothers), Fernando, (Italy) Benito Fantoni (sons)
- Oswaldo de Oliveira, Waldemar Lemos (brother)
- Ary Patusca, Araken Patusca (brother), Arnaldo da Silveira (cousin)
- Paulo César de Oliveira, Luís Flávio de Oliveira (referees, brother)
- Paulo Henrique, Paulo Henrique Filho (son), Henrique Lordelo (grandson)
- Marcos Pereira, Andreas Pereira (son)
- Piá, Joelson (brother), (Italy) Samuele Inacio (son)
- Pinga, Ziza (son), Arnaldo (brother)
- Pingo, (Portugal) Andreia Norton (daughter)
- Preguinho, Mano, Georges, Paulo (brothers)
- Quarenta, Quarentinha (son)
- Rafael, Fabio (twin brother)
- Raniele, Eric (brother)
- Wellington Rato, Wallace Rato (brother)
- Rivaldo, Rivaldinho, João Ferreira, Isaque (sons)
- Robinho, Robinho Júnior (son)
- Romário, Romarinho (son)
- Ronaldinho, Assis (brother), João Mendes (son) Diego Assis (nephew)
- Ronaldo, Milene Domingues (ex-wife)
- Roque, Cauã Lucca (son)
- Jair Rosa Pinto, Orlando Rosa Pinto (brother), Roberto Pinto (nephew)
- Sabará, Tiquinho (son)
- Wilton Sampaio, Sávio Sampaio (referees, brother)
- Servílio de Jesus and Servílio de Jesus Filho (son)
- Lucas Severino, Pedro Severino, João Victor Severino (sons)
- Silas, Paulo Pereira (twin brother), Eli Carlos (elder brother)
- Silva Batuta, Vanderlei (brother)
- Sócrates, Raí (brother)
- Cláudio Roberto Solito, Carlos Alberto Solito (brother)
- Amauri Stival, Cuca, Cuquinha (brothers)
- Diego Tardelli, Juninho Tardelli (brother)
- Mário Tilico (Amaro), Mário Tilico (son)
- Tite, Matheus Bachi (son)
- Sídney Tobias, Toninho Tobias (brother)
- Carlos Alberto Torres, Alexandre Torres (son)
- Ruan Tressoldi, Ramon Tressoldi (twin brother)
- Túlio Maravilha, Télvio (twin brother)
- Valdomiro, Maicon (great-nephew)
- Vastinho, Vagner Mancini (son), Matheus Mancini (grandson)
- Jonilson Veloso, Dante (nephew)
- Tiago Volpi, Neto Volpi, Fabian Volpi (cousins)
- Wagner, (Bosnia and Herzegovina) Ricardo Baiano (brother)
- Waldo, Wanderley (brother)
- Wallace, Lucas Reis (son)
- Washington Alves, Geraldo Assoviador (brother), (Portugal) Geraldo Alves, (Portugal) Bruno Alves, (Portugal) Júlio Alves (sons)
- Wladimir, Gabriel (son)
- Zague, (Mexico) Luís Roberto Alves (son)
- Zé Elias, Rubinho (brother)
- Zé Maria, Fernando Lázaro (son), Marco Antônio, Tuta (brothers)
- Zizinho, (Mexico) Éder dos Santos (son), (Mexico) Giovani dos Santos, (Mexico) Jonathan dos Santos (sons, half-brothers of Éder)
- Zózimo, Calazans (brother)

== Chile ==
- José Abarca, (United States) Diego Abarca (son), Jorge Acuña (cousin-in-law)
- Nicolás Abumohor, Ricardo Abumohor (son), Constantino Mohor (distant relative)
- Williams Alarcón Sr., Williams Alarcón Jr. (son)
- Miiko Albornoz (see (Sweden) Mauricio Albornoz)
- Patricio Almendra, Jonatan Almendra (brother)
- Luis Hernán Álvarez, Cristián Álvarez, Iván Álvarez (twin sons)
- Manuel Álvarez, Mario Álvarez (brother)
- Franz Arancibia, Leopoldo Arancibia, Eduardo Arancibia, Roque Arancibia (brothers), Francisco Arancibia (nephew/son of Leopoldo)
- Manuel Arancibia, Carlos Arancibia (brother)
- Orlando Aravena, Jorge Aravena (nephew)
- Karen Araya, Bernardo Araya (brother)
- Francisco Arellano, David Arellano, Guillermo Arellano (brothers)
- Juan Arias, Antonio Arias, Óscar Arias, Enrique Arias, Jorge Arias, Miguel Ángel Arias (brothers)
- Mauricio Aros, Joaquín Aros (son)
- Telésforo Báez, Guillermo Báez (brother)
- Bruno Barticciotto (see (Argentina) Marcelo Barticciotto)
- Hugo Berly, Jaime Berly (brother)
- Hernán Bolaños (see Costa Rica)
- Eduardo Bonvallet, Jean Pierre Bonvallet (son)
- Christian Bravo Sr., Christian Bravo Jr. (son)
- Melissa Bustos (see (Canada) Marco Bustos)
- Félix Cantín, José Luis Sierra Sr. (grandnephew), José Luis Sierra Jr. (son of José Luis Sr.), Sebastián Miranda (brother-in-law of José Luis Sr.), Benjamín Sierra (nephew of José Luis Sr. and Sebastián)
- Rafael Caroca, Ignacio Caroca, Matías Caroca (brothers)
- Osvaldo Carvajal, Voltaire Carvajal (brother)
- Hernán Carvallo, Fernando Carvallo, Luis Hernán Carvallo (sons)
- Luis Casanova Sr., Luis Casanova Jr. (son)
- Víctor Castañeda, Rolando Castañeda, Hugo Castañeda, Gerardo Castañeda (brothers), Víctor Hugo Castañeda, Cristián Castañeda (nephews/sons of Hugo)
- Óscar Castro, Niklas Castro (grandson)
- Matías Catalán, (Argentina) Marcos Catalán (brother)
- Luis Ceballos, Sergio Ceballos (brother)
- Luis Chavarría, Luis Cabezas (nephew)
- Raúl Coloma, Julio Coloma (brother), Luis Coloma (son)
- Julio Córdova, Jorge Córdova (brother)
- Fernando Cornejo Sr., Fernando Cornejo Jr. (son)
- Marco Cornez, Nicolás Córdova (son)
- Atilio Cremaschi, (United States) Benjamin Cremaschi (distant relative)
- Humberto Cruz Sr., Humberto Cruz Jr., Claudio Cruz (sons)
- Eduardo De Saa (see (Argentina) Manuel De Saa)
- Juan Delgado, Felipe Delgado (brother)
- Ítalo Díaz, Paulo Díaz, Nicolás Díaz (sons)
- Carlos Dittborn, Santiago Dittborn (great-nephew)
- José Luis Donoso, Mauricio Donoso (brother)
- Hugo Droguett, Jaime Droguett (brother)
- Óscar Fabbiani, (Argentina) Ricardo Fabbiani, (Argentina) Ariel Fabbiani, (Argentina) Daniel Fabbiani (brothers), (Argentina) Cristian Fabbiani (nephew)
- Matías Fernández, Nazareno Fernández (brother)
- Pedro Fernández, Hernán Fernández (brother)
- Cristián Flores, Kevin Flores (son)
- Luis Flores Pizarro, Luis Flores Abarca (son)
- Alberto Fouillioux Sr., Alberto Fouillioux Jr. (son)
- Eduardo Fournier, Gianni Fournier (son)
- Pablo Galdames Sr., Pablo Galdames Jr., Thomas Galdames, (Mexico) Benjamín Galdames (sons), Mathías Galdames (son/half-brother of Pablo Jr., Thomas and Benjamín) (Spain) Nerea Sánchez Millán (distant relative of Galdames brothers)
- Daniel Galindo, Mario Galindo (son)
- Darío Gálvez, Alejandro Osorio (cousin)
- Adán Godoy, Carlos Rivas Sr. (son-in-law) (Canada) Carlos Rivas Jr. (grandson/son of Carlos Sr.)
- Eduardo Gómez, Rubén Gómez, Omar Gómez, Osvaldo Gómez (brothers)
- Aníbal González Sr., (Mexico) Aníbal González Jr. (son)
- Ricardo González, Richard González (son)
- Juan Carlos Guarda, Luis Guarda (brother)
- Vladimir Guerrero, Maximiliano Guerrero (son)
- Orlando Gutiérrez, Felipe Gutiérrez (brother)
- Elías Hartard, Sofía Hartard (sister)
- César Henríquez, Ángelo Henríquez (brother)
- Iván Hernández, Mauricio Hernández (brother), Arturo Norambuena (cousin)
- Alejandro Hisis, Dominique Hisis, Alexandra Hisis (daughters)
- Carlos Hoffmann, Reynaldo Hoffmann (brother), Reinaldo Hoffmann, Alejandro Hoffmann (nephews/sons of Reynaldo), Raúl González (son-in-law of Reynaldo), Mark González (grandnephew/son of Raúl)
- Carlos Hormazábal, Pablo Hormazábal (son)
- Gustavo Huerta Sr., Gustavo Huerta Jr., Fernando Huerta, Carlos Huerta (sons)
- Osvaldo Hurtado, Francisco Ugarte (brother-in-law)
- Luis Ibarra, Marcelo Pacheco (son-in-law)
- Ignacio Jeraldino, Juan Jeraldino (twin brother)
- Luis Jiménez, Francisco Arriagada (nephew-in-law)
- Eugenio Julio, María Cristina Julio (niece)
- Lucas Kuscevic, Benjamín Kuscevic (brother)
- Félix Landa, Honorino Landa (brother)
- Francisco Las Heras Sr., Francisco Las Heras Jr. (son)
- Óscar Lee-Chong, Felipe Lee-Chong (son), Luis Lee-Chong (brother), Jaime Carreño (nephew)
- Mario Lepe, Óscar Lepe (brother), Ariel Uribe (cousin)
- Juan Livingstone, Sergio Livingstone (son), Andrés Livingstone, Mario Livingstone (grandsons/Sergio's nephews)
- José López, Luis López (brother)
- Benjamín Lorca, Juan Lorca (nephew)
- Paulo Magalhães (see (Brazil) Osmar Magalhães Sr.)
- Javier Margas, Catalina Margas (daughter), Luis Miguel Margas (son)
- Christian Martínez, Sebastián Martínez (brother)
- Gary Medel, Kevin Medel (brother)
- Gerardo Mediavilla, Felipe Mediavilla (brother)
- Rodrigo Meléndez, Javier Meléndez (son)
- Eugenio Méndez, Javier Méndez (brother)
- Sergio Messen, Fernando Messen (brother), Marcelo Salas (Sergio's niece's husband)
- Leonardo Monje, Joaquín Monje (son)
- Óscar Montalva, Carlos Araneda (nephew)
- Cristián Montecinos, Joaquín Montecinos (son)
- Clemente Montes (see (France) Richard Barroilhet)
- Horacio Muñoz, Bartolo Muñoz (brother)
- Ignacio Núñez, Diego Ulloa (nephew)
- Luis Núñez, Bryan Núñez (son)
- Cristián Olguín Sr., Cristián Olguín Jr. (son)
- Cristian Olivares, Richard Olivares (brother)
- Raúl Ormeño, Álvaro Ormeño, Martín Ormeño (sons)
- Julio Osorio, Luis Pérez (cousin)
- Guillermo Páez, Juan Páez (brother), Mauricio Pozo (son-in-law), Juan Pozo (Mauricio's father), Pablo Pozo, Nicolás Pozo (Mauricio's brothers)
- Atanasio Pardo, José Pardo (brother), Amalia Pardo (daughter), Claudio Bravo (grandson-in-law)
- Pablo Pasache (see Peru)
- Manuel Pedreros Sr., Leonel Pedreros (brother), Manuel Pedreros Jr. (son)
- Amed Pinto, (Palestine) Yashir Islame (brother)
- Rodrigo Pinto, Miguel Pinto (brother)
- Jaime Pizarro, Vicente Pizarro (son)
- Carlos Poblete Sr., (Mexico) Carlos Poblete Jr. (son)
- Ulises Poirier, Gustavo Poirrier (grandnephew)
- Fernando Prieto, Andrés Prieto, Ignacio Prieto (sons)
- Pablo Puyol, Mariano Puyol (son)
- Aníbal Ramírez, Jaime Ramírez (son)
- Carlos Reinoso Sr., (Mexico) Carlos Reinoso Jr. (son)
- Roberto Reynero, Felipe Reynero (son)
- Melchor Riera, Jaime Riera, Fernando Riera, Guillermo Riera, Juan Riera (brothers)
- Rolando Rivera, Rodrigo Rivera (son)
- George Robledo, Ted Robledo (brother)
- Héctor Robles, Andrés Robles (son)
- Héctor Roco Sr., Marcial Roco (brother), Héctor Roco Jr. (son), Sebastián Roco (nephew/Marcial's son), Bastián Roco (grandnephew/Sebastián's son)
- Manuel Rodríguez Vega, Gabriel Rodríguez Vega, Juan Rodríguez Vega (brothers), Juan Rodríguez Rubio, Francisco Rodríguez Rubio (nephews/Juan's sons)
- Bernardino Rojas, Nino Rojas (son), Ángelo Sagal, Bastián Sagal (nephews)
- Eladio Rojas, Leonel Herrera Sr. (cousin), Leonel Herrera Jr. (son of Leonel)
- Luis Rojas Sr., Silvio Rojas, Luis Rojas Jr. (sons)
- Ildefonso Rubio, Hugo Rubio (son), Eduardo Rubio, Matías Rubio, Diego Rubio (grandsons/sons of Hugo)
- Mario Salinas Sr., Mario Salinas Jr. (son)
- Mariana Sandoval, Gilberto Moreno (son), Charles Aránguiz (son/half-brother of Gilberto), Mario Sandoval (nephew)
- Carlos Schneeberger, Eduardo Schneeberger (cousin)
- Alfonso Sepúlveda, José Failla (cousin), Jorge Torres, Nelson Torres (cousins), Sergio Torres (cousin)
- Joel Soto, José Soto (nephew)
- Humberto Suazo, Arantza Suazo, Grettel Suazo (daughters)
- Carlos Tejas, Carla Tejas (daughter)
- Rolando Torino, (Guatemala) Armando Melgar (son-in-law), (Guatemala) Pablo Melgar, (Guatemala) Javier Melgar (grandsons)
- Javiera Toro, Ian Toro (brother)
- Juan Toro, Juan Toro Jr. (son or nephew), Hugo Bravo (grandson), Jorge Valdivia, Claudio Valdivia (grandsons/half-brothers of Hugo)
- Luka Tudor, Milan Tudor (son)
- Raimundo Tupper, (Venezuela) Javier González (cousin-nephew)
- Francisco Valdés, Sebastián González (nephew)
- Esteban Valencia Sr., Esteban Valencia Jr. (son)
- Eduardo Vargas, Emanuel Vargas (cousin)
- Sergio Vargas, Emanuel Vargas (son), Manuel Iturra (son-in-law)
- Nelson Vásquez, Carlos Vásquez (brother), Carlos Vásquez Jr. (grandson)
- Leonardo Véliz, Daniel Véliz (son)
- Arturo Vidal, Gonzalo Vásquez (cousin), Daniel Malhue (brother-in-law)
- Eduardo Vilches, Andrés Vilches (brother)
- Moisés Villarroel, Martín Villarroel (son)
- Gustavo Viveros, Ricardo Viveros (nephew), Juan Francisco Viveros (nephew/cousin of Ricardo)
- Fernando Wirth, Erwin Wirth, Óscar Wirth (sons), Rainer Wirth (grandson/son of Óscar)
- Guillermo Yávar, Jorge Yávar (brother)
- Víctor Zelada, Jorge Zelada (brother)

== Colombia ==
- Armando Amaya, José Amaya (son)
- Adolfo Andrade, Andrés Andrade (son)
- Juan Pablo Ángel, Tomás Ángel (son)
- Sergio Angulo, Mario Sergio Angulo (son)
- Paulo César Arango, Johan Arango (brother)
- Víctor Aristizábal, Emilio Aristizábal (son)
- Óscar Bolaño, Jorge Bolaño, Hugo Bolaño (sons)
- Wilmer Cabrera Sr., David Cabrera, Wilmer Cabrera Jr. (sons)
- Miguel Calero, Juan José Calero (son)
- Teófilo Campaz, Víctor Campaz (brother)
- Alfonso Cañón, José Miguel Cañón (brother), Roberto Alfonso Cañón (son)
- Bréiner Castillo, Juan Diego Castillo (nephew)
- Luis Felipe Chará, Diego Chará, Yimmi Chará (brothers)
- Marco Coll, Mario Coll (son)
- Wilman Conde Sr., Wilman Conde Jr. (son)
- Manuel Córdoba, Jhon Córdoba (son)
- Óscar Córdoba, Vanessa Córdoba (daughter)
- Jaime Deluque, Marlon Deluque (son)
- Alfredo Di Stefano (see (Italy) Alfredo Di Stefano Sr.)
- Ernesto Díaz, Andrés Ernesto Díaz, Francisco Javier Díaz (sons)
- Hernán Escobar, Álex Escobar (son)
- Leonardo Enciso, (Lebanon) Samy Merheg (nephew)
- Santiago Escobar, Andrés Escobar (brother)
- David Ferreira, (United States) Jesús Ferreira (son)
- Luis Augusto García, Lucho García (son)
- Radamel García, Radamel Falcao (son)
- Julio Gaviria Sr., Julio Edgar Gaviria, Vides Gaviria, Osnid Gaviria (sons)
- Hernán Darío Gómez, Gabriel Gómez (brother)
- Cristian Gil Sr, (El Salvador) Cristian Gil Jr, (El Salvador) Brayan Gil, (El Salvador) Mayer Gil (sons)
- Oswaldo Mackenzie, Roberto Carlos Mackenzie, Nadim Mackenzie (brothers)
- Vladimir Marín, Milena Narváez (wife), María Isabel Marín (daughter)
- Víctor Micolta, Pablo Armero (cousin)
- Santiago Montoya, Daniel Montoya (brother)
- Andrés Mosquera, Carlos Mosquera (brother)
- Óscar Muñoz Sr., Óscar Muñoz Jr. (son)
- Junior Murillo, Jeison Murillo (brother)
- Carlos Navarro Montoya (see (Argentina) Ricardo Jorge Navarro)
- Willington Ortiz, Julio César Ortiz (nephew)
- Nixon Perea, (United States) Andrés Perea (son)
- Robinson Rentería, Wason Rentería, Carlos Rentería (brothers)
- Freddy Rincón, Manuel Rincón, Ignacio Rincón (brothers), Sebastián Rincón (son)
- Hugo Rodallega, Carmen Rodallega (cousin)
- Wilson Rodríguez, James Rodríguez (son), David Ospina (James' brother-in-law)
- John Jairo Tréllez, Santiago Tréllez (son)
- Pablo Valderrama, Carlos Valderrama Sr. (brother), Alex Valderrama, Pablo Valderrama Jr. (sons), Carlos Valderrama, Alan Valderrama, Ronald Valderrama (nephews/sons of Carlos Sr.), Miguel González Palacios (nephew of Carlos Sr.)
- Adolfo Valencia, José Adolfo Valencia (son)
- Ariel Valenciano, Iván Valenciano (son)
- Ramiro Viáfara, Julián Viáfara (son)
- Cristián Zapata, Duván Zapata (cousin)

== Ecuador ==
- Óscar Achilier Sr., Jimmy Achilier (brother), Óscar Achilier Jr., Gabriel Achilier (sons)
- Walter Ayoví, Jaime Ayoví (cousin)
- Máximo Banguera, (Spain) Michael Dacosta, Malcom Dacosta (nephews)
- Ermen Benítez, Christian Benítez (son), Cléber Chalá (father-in-law of Christian)
- Álex Bolaños, Miller Bolaños (brother), Alexander Bolaños (cousin)
- Abdalá Bucaram, Dalo Bucaram (son)
- Gabriel Campana, Leonardo Campana (great-grandson), Isidro Romero (Leonardo's maternal grandfather)
- Héctor Carabalí, Wilson Carabalí (cousin), (Chile) Omar Carabalí (son of Wilson)
- Alex Cevallos, José Francisco Cevallos (brother), Xavier Cevallos (son), José Cevallos, Gabriel Cevallos (nephews/sons of José Francisco)
- Marlon de Jesús, Bryan de Jesús (brother)
- Raúl Guerrón, Joffre Guerrón (brother)
- Carlos Gruezo Sr., Carlos Gruezo Jr. (son)
- Eduardo Hurtado, (Chile) Érick Hurtado (son)
- Renato Ibarra, Romario Ibarra (brother)
- Javier Klimowicz (see (Argentina) Diego Klimowicz)
- Jazmín Mercado, Wendy Villón (cousin)
- Hólger Quintero, Edwin Quintero (twin brother)
- Néicer Reasco, Djorkaeff Reasco (son)
- Éder Valencia, Antonio Valencia (brother)

== French Guiana ==
- Florent Malouda (see France)
- Sloan Privat, Stéphane Privat (brother)

== Guyana ==
- Carl Cort, Leon Cort (brother) (England) Ruben Loftus-Cheek (half-brother)
- Neil Danns, (England) Jayden Danns (son)
- Briana De Souza, Kayla De Souza (sister)
- Julia Gonsalves, Olivia Gonsalves (sister)
- Reiss Greenidge, (England) Jordan Greenidge (brother)
- Ronayne Marsh-Brown, Keanu Marsh-Brown (brother)

== Paraguay ==
- Fredy Bareiro, Adam Bareiro (brother)
- Diego Barreto, Édgar Barreto (brother)
- Lucas Barrios, Víctor Cáceres, Marcos Cáceres (cousins)
- Delfín Benítez Cáceres, (Venezuela) Gabriel Benítez (grandson)
- Aldo Bobadilla, Damián Bobadilla (son)
- Rodrigo Bogarín, Dahiana Bogarín (sister)
- Hugo Brizuela, (Chile) Braulio Brizuela (brother)
- Luis Caballero, Luis Nery Caballero (son)
- Mauro Caballero Sr., Mauro Caballero Jr. (son)
- Virginio Cáceres, Raúl Cáceres, Marcelo Cáceres (sons)
- Cristino Centurión, (Argentina) Paulo Centurión (son)
- Rolando Chilavert, José Luis Chilavert (brother)
- Roberto Fernández, Roberto Júnior Fernández (son)
- Óscar Gamarra, Celso Ortiz (brother)
- Eligio Insfrán, Eliseo Insfrán (twin brother)
- Darío Jara Saguier, Ángel Jara Saguier, Enrique Jara Saguier, Carlos Jara Saguier, Alberto Jara Saguier (brothers)
- Pedro López, (United States) Steven Lopez, (United States) Bryan Lopez (sons)
- Ramón Mayeregger, (Paraguay) (Bolivia) Arturo Galarza, (Bolivia) Luis Galarza Sr. (half-brothers), (Bolivia) Rolando Galarza (nephew/son of Arturo), (Bolivia) Sergio Galarza, (Bolivia) Luis Galarza Jr. (nephews/sons of Luis Sr.)
- Fidel Miño Sr., Fidel Miño Jr. (son)
- Eugenio Morel, Claudio Morel Rodríguez (son)
- Gerónimo Ovelar, Fernando Ovelar (grandson)
- Luis Armando Ovelar, Roberto Ovelar (brother), Christian Ovelar (cousin)
- Amado Pérez, Marcelo Pérez (nephew)
- Óscar Romero, Ángel Romero (twin brother)
- Santiago Salcedo, Domingo Salcedo (brother)
- Óscar Santa Cruz, Roque Santa Cruz, Diego Santa Cruz, Julio Santa Cruz (brothers)
- Eladio Zárate, Marcos Zárate (son), Diego Gavilán (nephew), (Chile) Juan Martínez (his wife's uncle)

== Peru ==
- Santiago Acasiete, Jonathan Acasiete (brother)
- Luis Advíncula Sr., Luis Advíncula Jr. (son)
- Enrique Agurto, Diego Agurto (brother)
- Jorge Alcalde, Teodoro Alcalde, Víctor Alcalde (brothers)
- Fernando Alva, Piero Alva (son)
- Ernesto Arakaki, Mateo Arakaki (son)
- Carlos Ascues, Adrián Ascues (nephew)
- Guillermo Barbadillo, Gerónimo Barbadillo (son)
- Julio Baylón, Jair Baylón (son), Sandro Baylón (nephew)
- Juan Carlos Bazalar, Alonso Bazalar, Paolo Bazalar (sons)
- Juvenal Briceño, Darío Briceño (brother)
- Jahir Butrón, Leao Butrón (brother)
- Catriel Cabellos, (Argentina) Axel Cabellos (brother)
- Claudia Cagnina, Grace Cagnina (sister)
- Marcos Calderón, Luis Calderón (cousin), Julio Meléndez (nephew), Carlos Meléndez (son of Julio)
- Ángelo Campos, Paulo Campos (brother)
- Eloy Campos, Eloy Ortiz, César Loyola (nephews), Cord Cleque (great-nephew), (Chile) Joao Ortiz (nephew of Eloy Ortiz), Nilson Loyola (great-nephew/son of César)
- Xioczana Canales, Xiomara Canales (twin sister)
- Tiago Cantoro (see (Argentina) Mauro Cantoro)
- André Carrillo, Alex Carrillo (brother)
- Félix Castillo, Roberto Castillo (brother)
- Rafael Castillo Sr., Rafael Castillo Jr. (son)
- Aldo Cavero, Sandro Cavero, Milton Cavero (brothers)
- Roberto Chale, Roberto Chale Zímic (son)
- Héctor Chumpitaz, Rowland Chumpitaz (brother), Tito Chumpitaz (son)
- Paul Cominges, Juan Cominges (brother)
- Luis Cruzado, Rinaldo Cruzado (nephew)
- Martín Dall'Orso, Martín Dall'Orso Gabulle (son)
- Beto da Silva, Luciano da Silva (brother)
- José del Solar, Fernando del Solar (brother), Álvaro Barco (brother-in-law), Alfonso Barco (nephew/son of Álvaro)
- Guillermo Delgado, Erick Delgado (grandson)
- Rubén Toribio Díaz, Rubén Díaz Rondón (son)
- Adolfo Donayre, Leoncio Donayre, Homero Donayre (brothers)
- César Doy, Danfer Doy (brother)
- Roberto Drago Sr., Roberto Drago Jr., Miguel Drago, Jaime Drago (sons), Ignacio Drago (grandson/son of Roberto Jr.)
- Jaime Duarte, Félix Rivera (father-in-law)
- Alfonso Dulanto, Gustavo Dulanto (son)
- Domingo Farfán, Eusebio Farfán (brother)
- Roberto Farfán, Rafael Farfán (brother), Jefferson Farfán (nephew), Luis Guadalupe (Jefferson's uncle), (United States) Quembol Guadalupe (Jefferson's cousin/Luis' nephew)
- Arturo Fernández, Teodoro Fernández, Eduardo Fernández (brothers), José Fernández, Jorge Fernández, Carlos Fernández (nephews)
- Víctor "El Zurdo" Fernández, Collin Fernandez (son)
- Edison Flores, Roberto Siucho (brother-in-law), Kimberly Flores (sister)
- Juan Flores Ascencio, Carlos Flores Ascencio (brother)
- Luis Flores, Luis Felipe Flores (son)
- Isidro Fuentes, Aldair Fuentes, Jean Pierre Fuentes (sons)
- Alberto Gallardo, Teddy Cardama (son-in-law), Teddy Cardama Gallardo (grandson/Teddy's son)
- John Galliquio, Wilder Galliquio (brother)
- Domingo García, Filomeno García (brother)
- Julio César García, Carlos Alberto García (brother)
- Carlos Gómez Sánchez, Óscar Gómez Sánchez (brother), José Gonzales Ganoza, Carlos Gonzales Ganoza (nephews), Julio Rivera (nephew of José and Carlos), Paolo Guerrero (nephew of José and Carlos/half-brother of Julio), Carlos "Mágico" Gonzales (cousin of Paolo), Sergio Peña (nephew of Paolo), Jairsinho Gonzales (nephew of Paolo/son of Carlos "Mágico" Gonzales)
- Andrés González, Javier González (brother)
- Juan González-Vigil, Aurelio Gonzales-Vigil (brother), Matías Zegarra (nephew), Dimas Zegarra (grandfather of Matías)
- Renzo Guevara, Cristian Guevara (brother)
- Juan Francisco Hernández, Luis Alberto Hernández (brother)
- Jhoel Herrera, Fabiola Herrera (sister)
- Paulo Hinostroza, Hernán Hinostroza (son)
- Alejandro Hohberg (see (Uruguay) Juan Hohberg)
- Jorge Huamán, Paolo Huamán (son)
- Mario Iwasaki, Tomás Iwasaki (brother)
- Ernesto Labarthe, Gianfranco Labarthe (son)
- Gianluca Lapadula, Davide Lapadula (brother)
- Guillermo La Rosa, Inocencio La Rosa, Felipe La Rosa, Eugenio La Rosa (brothers), Guillermo La Rosa Pérez (son), Roberto Guizasola (nephew of Guillermo La Rosa), Guillermo Guizasola (nephew of Guillermo La Rosa/brother of Roberto)
- Dagoberto Lavalle, Dagoberto Lavalle Fukushima (son)
- Carlos Lazón Sr., Carlos Lazón Jr. (son)
- Víctor Lobatón, Hugo Lobatón, Pablo Lobatón (brothers), Carlos Lobatón Donayre (cousin), Abel Lobatón Sr., Manuel Lobatón (cousins), Abel Lobatón Jr., Carlos Lobatón, Jhilmar Lobatón (cousin-nephews/sons of Abel Sr.)
- Juan Lojas, Sebastián Lojas (brother)
- Jhilmar Lora, Fabrizio Lora (brother)
- Flavio Maestri, Claudio Maestri (brother)
- Alex Magallanes Sr., Alex Magallanes Jr., Piero Magallanes (sons)
- Rodulfo Manzo, Ytalo Manzo (son)
- Eduardo Márquez, Carlos Márquez, Óscar Márquez, Huberth Márquez (brothers)
- Fernando Mellán, Manuel Mellán (brother)
- Andrés Mendoza, Mauriño Mendoza (cousin), José Mendoza Ísmodes (uncle)
- Ramón Mifflin Sr., (United States) Ramón Mifflin Jr. (son)
- José Morales, Roberto Morales, Julio Morales, Ernesto Morales (brothers)
- Carlos Moscoso, Pedro Moscoso (brother)
- Alfredo Mosquera, Máximo Mosquera (brother), Nemesio Mosquera (half-brother), Roberto Mosquera (son)
- Edgar Navarro Montoya (see (Argentina) Ricardo Jorge Navarro)
- Franco Navarro Sr., Franco Navarro Jr. (son)
- Ernesto Neyra, Genaro Neyra (brother)
- Román Ojeda, Rodolfo Ojeda (brother)
- Percy Olivares, Christopher Olivares (son)
- Walter Ormeño, Santiago Ormeño (grandson)
- Augusto Palacios, Guillermo Palacios, Celso Palacios (brothers)
- Roberto Palacios, Brandon Palacios (son)
- Jorge Pardon, José Pardón (brother)
- Pablo Pasache, Víctor Pasache, Luis Pasache (relatives)
- Enrique Perales, Constantino Perales, Agapito Perales (brothers)
- Claudio Pizarro, Diego Pizarro (brother)
- Giuliano Portilla, Marco Portilla, Luis Portilla (brothers)
- Kevin Quevedo, Sebastián Quevedo (brother)
- Nelinho Quina, Minzum Quina (brother)
- Henry Quinteros, Ronald Quinteros (brother)
- Alberto Ramírez, Luis Ramírez (son)
- Oswaldo Ramírez Salcedo, Jorge Ramírez Salcedo (brother)
- Hernán Rengifo, Nicolás Rengifo (son)
- Pedro Requena Sr., Pedro Requena Jr. (son)
- Carlos Reyna, Miguel Reyna (son), Paolo Reyna (grandson)
- Eduardo Rey Muñoz, Humberto Rey Muñoz (brother)
- Rafael Risco Sr., Rafael Risco Jr., Tadeo Risco (sons)
- Willy Rivas, Fernando Pacheco (nephew)
- Alberto Rodríguez, Mateo Rodríguez (son)
- Luis Rubiños, Gerardo Rubiños (brother)
- Raúl Ruidíaz, Yamir Ruidíaz (brother)
- Daniel Ruiz, Jaime Ruiz, Eusebio Ruiz, Manuel Ruiz, Enrique Ruiz, Víctor Manuel Ruiz, Claudio Ruiz, Pedro Ruiz (brothers)
- Waldir Sáenz, Yerson Sáenz (brother)
- Eusebio Salazar, Aldair Salazar, Javier Salazar (sons)
- Caroline Shevlin, Grace Shevlin (twin sister)
- Javier Soria, David Soria (brother)
- Hugo Sotil, Johan Sotil (son)
- José Soto, Jorge Soto, Giancarlo Soto (brothers)
- Manuel Suárez, Félix Suárez (nephew), Fidel Suárez, José Suárez (nephews/brothers of Félix)
- Alexander Succar, Matías Succar (brother)
- Gilberto Torres, Carlos Torres (brother)
- Miguel Trauco, Javier Trauco, José Trauco (cousins)
- Edwin Uehara, Leonardo Uehara (cousin)
- Julio César Uribe, Édson Uribe (son)
- Carlos Urrunaga, Héctor Urrunaga Sr. (son), Héctor Urrunaga Jr., Stephano Urrunaga, Italo Urrunaga (grandsons)
- Guillermo Valdivieso, Pedro Valdivieso (brother)
- Wilmar Valencia, Marco Valencia (brother)
- Cedric Vásquez, Christian Vásquez (brother)
- José Velásquez, Juan Velásquez (son), Jhoao Velásquez (grandson)
- Juan Vidales, Octavio Vidales (brother), Jhonny Vidales (son)
- Walter Vílchez, Óscar Vílchez (brother)
- Carlos Zambrano, Luciano Zambrano (son)
- José Zamora, Marcelo Zamora (brother)
- Víctor Zegarra, Pablo Zegarra, Carlos Zegarra (sons), Andrés Zegarra (cousin), Camilo Zegarra (nephew)
- Patrick Zubczuk (see (Argentina) Juan Carlos Zubczuk)
- Ysrael Zúñiga, Christian Zúñiga (brother)

== Suriname ==
- Roland Alberg (see (Netherlands) Ibad Muhamadu)
- Frank Borgia, Kenneth Borgia (brother)
- Wensley Bundel, Rosano Bundel (son)
- Mitchell Donald, (Netherlands) Joël Donald (brother)
- Giovanni Drenthe (see (Netherlands) Royston Drenthe)
- Errol Emanuelson, (Netherlands) Julian Emanuelson, (Netherlands) Urby Emanuelson (sons), Roché Emanuelson (nephew), (Suriname) Jean-Paul Boëtius (cousin of Julian & Urby)
- Roxey Fer, Donnegy Fer (brother)
- Iwan Fränkel, Ray Fränkel (son), Purrel Fränkel (nephew)
- Dean Gorré, (Curaçao) Kenji Gorré (son)
- Danzell Gravenberch, (Netherlands) Ryan Gravenberch (brother)
- Jacques Alex Hasselbaink, (Netherlands) Jimmy Floyd Hasselbaink, (Netherlands) Carlos Hasselbaink (nephews), Nigel Hasselbaink (second nephew), (Netherlands) Marvin Hasselbaink (second nephew-cousin of Nigel), (Netherlands) Mitchell Piqué (cousin-nephew of Nigel)
- Kenneth Jaliens, (Netherlands) Kew Jaliens (nephew)
- Kenneth Kluivert, (Netherlands) Patrick Kluivert (son), (Netherlands) Justin Kluivert, (Netherlands) Ruben Kluivert (grandsons/son of Patrick)
- Leo Kogeldans, (Netherlands) Ruben Kogeldans (son)
- Justin Lonwijk, (Netherlands) Nigel Lonwijk (brother)
- Humphrey Mijnals, Frank Mijnals, Stanley Mijnals (brothers)
- Frank Rigters, Delano Rigters (son), Gregory Rigters (grandson)
- Herman Rijkaard, (Netherlands) Frank Rijkaard (son)
- Johann Seedorf, (Netherlands) Clarence Seedorf, (Netherlands) Jürgen Seedorf, (Netherlands) Chedric Seedorf (sons), (Netherlands) Stefano Seedorf, (Netherlands) Rahmlee Seedorf, (Netherlands) Collin Seedorf, (Netherlands) Cain Seedorf (nephews)
- Roy Vanenburg, (Netherlands) Gerald Vanenburg (nephew), (Netherlands) Jermaine Vanenburg (nephew/cousin of Gerald)
- Dylan Vente (see (Netherlands) Leen Vente)
- Ricardo Winter, (Netherlands) Aron Winter (cousin)

== Uruguay ==
- Sebastián Abreu, Diego Abreu (son)
- Óscar Aguirregaray, Matías Aguirregaray (son), Gastón Guruceaga (nephew-in-law/cousin of Matías)
- Diego Alonso, Iván Alonso, Matías Alonso (cousins)
- Atilio Ancheta, Rafa Ancheta (granddaughter)
- José Leandro Andrade, Víctor Rodríguez Andrade (nephew)
- Gustavo Badell, Yamila Badell (daughter)
- Enrique Báez, Jaime Báez (son)
- Adolfo Barán, Nicolás Barán, Santiago Barán, Agustín Barán (sons)
- Deivis Barone, Fátima Barone (daughter), Faustino Barone (son)
- Eber Bueno, Carlos Bueno (son)
- Gastón Bueno, Santiago Bueno (brother), Gonzalo Bueno (cousin)
- Domingo Cáceres, Pablo Cáceres (son)
- Osvaldo Canobbio, Agustín Canobbio (son)
- Jorge Daniel Cardaccio, Mathías Cardaccio (nephew), Belén Cardaccio (niece/Mathías' sister)
- Nery Castillo Sr., Gary Castillo (brother), (Mexico) Nery Castillo Jr. (son)
- Fabián Coelho, Diego Coelho (son)
- Juan Carlos Corazzo, Pablo Forlán (son-in-law), Diego Forlán (son of Pablo) Cristopher Fiermarin (distant relative of Diego)
- Gabriel Correa, Yannel Correa (daughter)
- Jorge da Silva, Rubén da Silva (brother)
- Víctor Diogo, Carlos Diogo (son)
- Raúl Esnal, (El Salvador) Cristian Esnal (son)
- Roque Fernández, (Venezuela) Pedro Fernández (son)
- Darío Flores, Robert Flores (brother)
- Daniel Fonseca, Nicolás Fonseca, Matías Fonseca (sons)
- Marcelo Fracchia, Matías Fracchia (son)
- Enzo Francescoli, Marco Francescoli (son)
- Walter Gargano, (Slovakia) Marek Hamšík (brother-in-law)
- Gervasio González, (Venezuela) Andreé González (son)
- Juan González, Giovanni González (son)
- Néstor Gonçalves, Jorge Gonçálvez (son)
- Walter Guglielmone, Christian Cavani, Edinson Cavani (half-brothers)
- José Herrera, Claudio Herrera (son), Diego Godín (son-in-law)
- Juan Hohberg, (Peru) Alejandro Hohberg (grandson)
- Diego López, (Italy) Thiago López (son)
- Alberto Martínez, (Austria) Sebastián Martínez (son)
- Roberto Matosas, Gustavo Matosas (son)
- Gisleno Medina, Orlando Medina (brother)
- Julio Montero Castillo, Paolo Montero (son), Alfonso Montero (grandson, son of Paolo)
- Sergio Navarro, Agustín Navarro (son)
- Washington Olivera, Bryan Olivera (son)
- Santiago Ostolaza Sr., Santiago Ostolaza Jr. (son)
- Walter Pandiani, Nico Pandiani (son)
- Gustavo Poyet, Marcelo Poyet (brother), Diego Poyet (son)
- Álvaro Recoba, Julio Recoba (son)
- Climaco Rodríguez, Coquito (nephew), Álvaro Rodríguez (great-nephew, son of Coquito)
- Emiliano Rodríguez, Luciano Rodríguez (twin brother)
- Héctor Rodríguez, Darío Rodríguez (brother)
- Carlos Sánchez, Nicolás De La Cruz (half-brother), Facundo Trinidad (nephew)
- Carlos Scarone, Héctor Scarone (brother)
- Raúl Schiaffino, (Uruguay) (Italy) Juan Alberto Schiaffino (brother)
- Andrés Scotti, Diego Scotti (brother)
- Heberley Sosa, Sebastián Sosa, Nicolás Sosa (sons)
- Damián Suárez, Mathías Suárez (brother)
- Paolo Suárez, Luis Suárez, Maximiliano Suárez, Diego Suárez (brothers)
- Obdulio Varela, Luis Varela (cousin)
- Matías VelázquezEmiliano Velázquez (brother)
- Waldemar Victorino, Mauricio Victorino (nephew)
- Ondino Viera, Milton Viera (son)
- Nicolás Vikonis, (Mexico) Carlos Salcedo (brother-in-law)
- José Zalazar, (Spain) Kuki Zalazar, Rodrigo Zalazar, Mauro Zalazar (sons)

== Venezuela ==
- Bernardo Añor Sr., Bernardo Añor Jr., Juan Pablo Añor (sons)
- Jhonny Arocha, Rubén Arocha (son)
- Gabriel Benítez (see (Paraguay) Delfín Benítez Cáceres)
- Cristian Cásseres Sr., Cristian Cásseres Jr. (son)
- Luigi Mauro Cichero, Alejandro Cichero, Gabriel Cichero, Mauro Cichero (sons), Alejandro Cichero Jr (grandson/son of Alejandro Sr.)
- Ramón Echenausi, Miguel Echenausi (son)
- Freddy Elie, Roberto Elie (brother)
- César Farías, Daniel Farías (brother)
- Frank Feltscher, Rolf Feltscher (brother), (Switzerland) Mattia Desole (stepbrother)
- Pedro Fernández (see (Uruguay) Roque Fernández)
- Nahuel Ferraresi (see (Argentina) Adolfo Ferraresi)
- Andreé González (see (Uruguay) Gervasio González)
- Javier González (see (Chile) Raimundo Tupper)
- Joel Graterol, Jorge Graterol (brother)
- Jonay Hernández, Dani Hernández (brother)
- Andrés Jiménez, Leopoldo Jiménez (son)
- Coromoto Lucena, Pedro Lucena, Johnny Lucena, Franklin Lucena, Ronaldo Lucena (sons)
- Christian Makoun (see (Cameroon) Bayoi Makoun)
- Saúl Maldonado, Carlos Maldonado (brother), Javier Maldonado, Andrés Maldonado (twin sons), Giancarlo Maldonado (nephew/son of Carlos)
- Esteban Martínez, David Martínez (brother)
- Rafael Mea Vitali, Miguel Mea Vitali (brother)
- Luis Alfredo Mendoza, Luis Carlos Mendoza (son)
- Júnior Moreno (see (Argentina) Carlos Horacio Moreno)
- Richard Páez, Raymond Páez, Andrew Páez (brothers), Ricardo Páez (son), Gustavo Páez, Diego Páez (nephews, sons of Raymond, cousins of Ricardo), Ayrton Páez (nephew, son of Andrew, cousin of Ricardo), José Antonio Páez, Jorge Alberto Páez, Eduardo Páez, Juan Manuel Páez, Octavio Páez, Daniel Páez (another relatives)
- Jaime Ponce, Andrés Ponce (brother)
- Antonio Ravelo, José Ravelo (brother)
- Roberto Rosales, Aileen Rosales (sister), Harold Rosales (brother), Oriana Altuve (cousin)
- Manuel Sanhouse Sr., Manuel Sanhouse Jr. (son)
- Luis Manuel Seijas, Luis Roberto Seijas (brother)
- Argenis Tortolero, Edson Tortolero (son), Juan Arango (son-in-law) Juan Arango Jr. (great grandson, grandson of Edson and son of Juan Arango)
- Vicente Vega, Renny Vega (son)
- Gerardo Vielma, Leonel Vielma (son), Ronaldo Rivas, Edson Rivas (grandsons/nephews of Leonel)

== See also ==
- List of professional sports families
- List of family relations in American football
  - List of second-generation National Football League players
- List of association football (soccer) families
  - List of African association football families
  - List of European association football families
    - List of English association football families
    - List of former Yugoslavia association football families
    - List of Scottish football families
    - List of Spanish association football families
  - Category:Association football families
- List of Australian rules football families
- List of second-generation Major League Baseball players
- List of second-generation National Basketball Association players
- List of boxing families
- List of chess families
- List of International cricket families
- List of family relations in the National Hockey League
- List of family relations in rugby league
- List of international rugby union families
- List of professional wrestling families
