= List of association football families =

This is a list of association football families. The countries are listed according to the national teams of the senior family member if the other family member played for a different country. If the senior members of the given member did not play international football, the family will be listed according to nationality (e.g., the Trézéguets).

Families included on the list must have

1. at least, one member of the family is capped by a national team on the senior level or an important person in the game of football (e.g., notable coaches, referees, club chairmen, etc.)
2. a second member must be a professional player or capped by a national team on the senior level.

== Father–son play in the same match ==
- Alec Herd, David Herd — Stockport County, (1950–51 season)
- Ian Bowyer, Gary Bowyer — Hereford United, (1989–90 season)
- Stanisław Terlecki, Maciej Terlecki — Polonia Warszawa, (1992–93 season)
- Juan Carlos Bazalar, Alonso Bazalar — Cienciano, (2008 season)
- Henrik Larsson, Jordan Larsson — Högaborgs BK, (2013 season)
- Rivaldo, Rivaldinho — Mogi Mirim (2014 and 2015 season), both also scored a goal each in the match against Macaé, 14 July 2015.
- Jorge Huamán, Paolo Huamán — Sport Boys (2015 season)
- Ludemar, Felipe — União Carmolandense (2021 season)
- Maman Abdurahman, Rafa Abdurahman — Persija Jakarta (2023–24 season)
- Romário, Romarinho — America-RJ (2024 season)
- Magno Alves, Pedrinho — Atlético Cearense (2025 season)
- Carlos Zambrano, Luciano Zambrano — Sport Boys (2026 season)

On 24 April 1996, Eiður Guðjohnsen (17) entered the match as a substitute for his father Arnór Guðjohnsen (36), playing for Iceland against Estonia.

== Afghanistan ==
- Qays Shayesteh, Faysal Shayesteh (brother)
- David Najem, Adam Najem (brother)

== American Samoa ==
- Shalom Luani, Roy Luani and Sumeo Luani (brother)
- Alma Mana’o, Ava Mana’o, Severina Mana’o (Sisters), Haleigh (C )

== Antigua and Barbuda ==
- Dario Barthley, Dajun Barthley, Dajari Barthley (brothers)
- Sowerby Gomes, Amaya Gomes (daughter)
- Courtney Wildin, Luther Wildin (brother)

== Aruba ==
- Leroy Oehlers, Dwight Oehlers (brother)

== Australia ==
- Marin Alagich, Joe Alagich (son), Colin Alagich (nephew), Richie Alagich (son of Colin), Dianne Alagich (daughter of Colin/Richie's sister), Ethan Alagich (great-nephew/Richie's son)
- Ross Aloisi, John Aloisi (brother)
- John Anastasiadis, Dean Anastasiadis (brother)
- Terry Antonis, George Antonis (brother)
- Graham Arnold, Trent Sainsbury (son-in-law)
- Francis Awaritefe, Reuben Awaritefe (son)
- Kearyn Baccus, Keanu Baccus (brother)
- James Bayliss, (New Zealand) Lachlan Bayliss (brother)
- Paul Bilokapic, Nicholas Bilokapic (nephew)
- Jordan Bos, Kasey Bos (brother)
- Martin Boyle (see (Scotland) Rachael Boyle)
- Vic Bozanic, Oliver Bozanic (son),
- Mark Bresciano, Robert Bresciano (brother)
- Ashley Brown, Jordan Brown (brother)
- Rod Brown, Corey Brown (son)
- Tim Cahill, (Samoa) Chris Cahill (brother), (Samoa) Damien Fonoti (cousin), Kyah Cahill (son), Shae Cahill (son)
- Leo Carle, Nick Carle (brother)
- Amy Chapman, Georgia Chapman (twin sister)
- Scott Chipperfield, (Switzerland) Liam Chipperfield (son)
- John Coyne, Chris Coyne, Jamie Coyne (sons), Aidan Coyne (grandson/son of Chris)
- Jason Culina (see (Croatia) Branko Culina)
- Jock Cumberford, Dave Cumberford (brother)
- Alan Davidson, Jason Davidson (son)
- Thomas Deng (see (South Sudan) Peter Deng)
- Bobby Despotovski, Sebastian Despotovski (son)
- Alistair Edwards, Cameron Edwards, Ryan Edwards (sons)
- Callum Elder (see (Republic of Ireland) Paddy Turner)
- Ahmad Elrich, Tarek Elrich (brother)
- Frank Farina, Zenon Caravella (nephew)
- Bruno Fornaroli, (Uruguay) Valentín Fornaroli (brother)
- Ivan Franjic, Joseph Franjic (brother)
- Ciara Fowler, Mary Fowler (sister)
- Alex Gibb, Lex Gibb (son)
- Adam Griffiths, Joel Griffiths (twin brother), Ryan Griffiths (brother)
- Diesel Herrington, Lucas Herrington (brother)
- Andy Henderson, Bill Henderson (son)
- Steve Hogg, Kahlia Hogg (daughter)
- Bernie Ibini-Isei, Princess Ibini-Isei (sister)
- John Iredale, Samantha Iredale (wife)
- Tomi Juric, Deni Juric (brother)
- Sam Kerr, (United States) Kristie Mewis (wife), (United States) Sam Mewis (sister-in-law/Kristine's sister)
- Leena Khamis, Sham Khamis (sister)
- Taren King, Joel King (brother)
- Alou Kuol, (South Sudan) Teng Kuol, Garang Kuol (brothers)
- Percy Lennard, Jack Lennard (son)
- Jamie Maclaren (see (Scotland) Donald MacLaren)
- John Markovski, Tom Markovski (brother), Jonas Markovski (son), Maja Markovski (niece/Tom's daughter),
- Garry McDowall, (Scotland) Kenny McDowall (brother)
- Ryan McGowan, Dylan McGowan (brother)
- Brodie Mooy, Aaron Mooy (cousin)
- Damian Mori, Joshua Mori (son)
- Joe Mullen, Daniel Mullen (son), Matthew Mullen, Alex Mullen (nephews)
- Bugsy Nyskohus, John Nyskohus (brother)
- Paul Okon, Paul Okon-Engstler (son), (Italy) Gianluca Okon (son)
- Jason Petkovic, Michael Petkovic (brother)
- Dimitri Petratos, Kosta Petratos, Maki Petratos (brothers)
- Tony Popovic, Kristian Popovic, Gabriel Popovic (sons)
- Natasha Prior (see (England) Spencer Prior)
- Alex Roberteson, Mark Robertson, Alexander Robertson (grandson, son of Mark)
- Mark Schwarzer, (Philippines) Julian Schwarzer (son)
- Gema Simon, Kyah Simon (cousin)
- Robbie Slater, Tom Slater (son)
- Harry Souttar (see (Scotland) John Souttar)
- Ryan Strain (see (United States) Gerry Baker)
- Ashleigh Sykes, Nicole Begg (née Sykes) (twin sister)
- Chris Triantis, Peter Triantis, (Greece) Nectarios Triantis (brothers)
- Al Hassan Toure, Mohamed Toure, Musa Toure (brothers)
- Michael Valkanis, Dimitri Valkanis (son)
- Cliff van Blerk, Jason van Blerk (son)
- Gary van Egmond, Emily van Egmond (daughter)
- Aurelio Vidmar, Tony Vidmar (brother), Mikayla Vidmar (niece/daughter of Tony), Kane Vidmar (nephew/son of Tony)
- Dario Vidošić (see (Croatia) Rado Vidošić)
- Mark Viduka, (Croatia) Luka Modrić (cousin)
- Rhys Williams, Aryn Williams, (India) Ryan Williams (brothers)
- Tameka Yallop (see (New Zealand) Kirsty Yallop)
- Kusini Yengi, Tete Yengi (brother)
- Robert Younis, Marcus Younis (nephew), Talia Younis (niece, sister of Marcus)
- Ned Zelic, Ivan Zelic (brother), Lucy Zelić (sister)
- Andrew Zinni, Stefan Zinni (son)

== Bangladesh ==
- Sohel Rana, Pappu Hossain (nephew)

== Barbados ==
- Fabian Forde, (England) Shaq Forde (son)
- Curtis Hutson (see (Wales) Ryan Giggs)
- Louie Soares, (England) Tom Soares (brother)

== Bermuda ==
- Andrew Bascome, David Bascome (brother), Druw Bascome (daughter), Drewonde Bascome, Osagi Bascome (nephews), (United States) Mia Fishel (niece)

== Brunei ==
- Abdul Azizi Ali Rahman, Azwan Ali Rahman (brother)
- Afi Aminuddin, Wafi Aminuddin (brother)
- Hardi Bujang, Mardi Mirza Abdullah (twin brother)
- Prince Abdul Qawi, Faiq Bolkiah (cousin)
- Hariz Danial Khallidden, Martin Haddy Khallidden (brother)
- Jefry Mohammad, Moksen Mohammad (brother)
- Shahrazen Said, Amalul Said (brother), Ahmad Hafiz Said (brother), Adi Said (brother), Hakeme Yazid Said (brother)
- Amir Ajmal Tahir, Aminuddin Zakwan Tahir (brother)

== Cambodia ==
- Keo Sokngon, Keo Sokpheng (brother)
- Um Vichet, Um Sereyroth (brother)

== Canada ==
- Sam Adekugbe, (England) Elijah Adekugbe (brother)
- Matthew Baldisimo, (Philippines) Michael Baldisimo (brother)
- Alex Bunbury, (United States) Teal Bunbury, Mataeo Bunbury (sons)
- Marco Bustos, (Chile) Melissa Bustos (sister)
- David Choinière, Mathieu Choinière (brother)
- Dwayne De Rosario, (Guyana) Osaze De Rosario, Adisa De Rosario (sons)
- Jamar Dixon, Elijah Roche (nephew)
- David Edgar (see (England) Eddie Edgar)
- Sherif El-Masri, (Guyana) Mariam El-Masri (sister)
- Mauro Eustáquio, Stephen Eustáquio (brother)
- Marcelo Flores (see (Mexico) Ruben Flores)
- Brian Gant, Bruce Gant (brother), Christine Sinclair (niece of Brian and Bruce)
- Julian de Guzman, (Netherlands) Jonathan de Guzmán (brother) (Netherlands) Jaden de Guzmán (nephew, son of Jonathan)
- Will Johnson (see (England) Brian Birch)
- John Kerr Sr., (United States) John Kerr Jr. (son)
- Richie Laryea, Reggie Laryea (brother)
- Sam Lenarduzzi, Vanni Lenarduzzi, Bob Lenarduzzi, Danny Lenarduzzi (brothers)
- Issey Nakajima-Farran, Paris Nakajima-Farran (brother)
- Jonathan Osorio, Anthony Osorio, Nicholas Osorio (brothers)
- Mason Trafford, Charlie Trafford (cousin)

== Cayman Islands ==
- Rico Bodden, Rico Bodden Jr. (son)
- Andrew Holness, Albertini Holness (son)
- Luis Morejon, Devonte Morejon (son)
- Antwan Seymour, Ernie Seymour (brother)

== China ==
- Gao Zhongxun, Gao Zhunyi (son)
- Gao Sheng, (Japan) Takahiro Ko (son)
- Hao Haidong, Hao Haitao (cousin), Hao Runze (son)
- Jiang Jin, Jiang Hong (brother)
- Liu Tao, Song Xiaoli (wife)
- Peng Weiguo, Peng Weijun (brother)
- Sun Ji, Sun Xiang (twin brother)
- Tang Miao, Tang Xin (twin brother)
- Wang Huiliang, Wang Peng (son)
- Xie Hongjun, Xie Feng (son)
- Xie Yuxin, Xie Weijun (son)
- Yao Daogang, Yao Wei (sister)
- Zhang Chenglin, Zhang Chengxiang (brother)

== Costa Rica ==
- Robert Arias, Aarón Salazar (nephew)
- Hernán Bolaños, Óscar Bolaños (brother)
- Jonathan Bolaños, Christian Bolaños (brother)
- Kenny Cunningham, Kevin Cunningham (twin brother)
- Jervis Drummond, Gerald Drummond (twin brother)
- Guillermo Elizondo Sr., Carlos Elizondo, Guillermo Elizondo Jr., Wálter Elizondo (sons)
- Alexandre Guimarães, Celso Borges (son)
- Ariel Lassiter (see (United States) Roy Lassiter)
- Dennis Marshall Sr., Dennis Marshall Jr. (son)
- Roy Myrie, David Myrie (brother) Kenay Myrie (son)
- Erick Rodríguez, Ariel Rodríguez (son)
- Bryan Ruiz, Yendrick Ruiz (brother)
- Alejandro Sequeira, Douglas Sequeira Sr. (brother), Douglas Sequeira Jr. (nephew/son of Douglas Sr.)
- Mauricio Solís, Erick Solís (brother)
- Vicente Wanchope, Javier Wanchope, Paulo Wanchope (sons)

== Curaçao ==
- Kemy Agustien, Demiane Agustien (son)
- Johnsen Bacuna, Leandro Bacuna, Juninho Bacuna (brothers)
- Charlison Benschop, Kevin Felida (nephew)
- Nathan Markelo, (Suriname) Jahnoah Markelo (brother)
- Eugene Martha, Benjamin Martha, Angelo Martha (brothers)
- Javier Martina, Cuco Martina (brother)
- Shermaine Martina, Shermar Martina (twin brother)
- Dylan Timber, (Netherlands) Quinten Timber, (Netherlands) Jurriën Timber (brothers)
- Nuelson Wau, Nyron Wau (brother)

== Dominican Republic ==
- José Espinal, Vinicio Espinal (twin brother)
- Meagan Harbison, (United States) Hailey Harbison (sister)
- Benji Núñez, Fran Núñez (twin brother)
- Antonio Santurro, (Italy) Riccardo Santurro (twin brother)

== Egypt ==
- Ekramy El-Shahat, Sherif Ekramy (son)
- Yehia Emam, Hamada Emam (son), Hazem Emam (grandson, son of Hamada)
- Hossam Hassan, Ibrahim Hassan (brother)

== El Salvador ==
- Dennis Alas, Jaime Alas (brother)
- Darwin Cerén, Óscar Cerén (brother), Brenda Cerén (sister)
- Ronald Cerritos, Alexis Cerritos (son)
- Luis Abraham Coreas, Salvador Coreas Sr., Víctor Coreas (brothers), Salvador Coreas Jr., Raúl Coreas (nephews)
- Cristian Esnal (see (Uruguay) Raúl Esnal)
- Cristian Gil, Brayan Gil, Mayer Gil (see (Colombia) Cristian Gil Sr.)
- Francisco Jovel Sr., Francisco Jovel Jr. (son)
- Salvador Mariona, Javier Mariona (grandson)
- Hugo Pérez Sr., (United States) Hugo Pérez, (United States) Giovanni Pérez (sons), Joshua Pérez (grandson/son of Giovanni)
- Pablo Punyed, (Nicaragua) Renato Punyed (brother)
- Alex Roldan (see (United States) Cesar Roldan)
- Alfredo Ruano, Mágico González (son-in-law), Mauricio González, Efraín González, Miguel González, Jesús González (Mágico's brothers), Rodrigo González (Mágico's son), (Spain) Jorge Werner (Mágico's son/half-brother of Rodrigo and Jorge G.), Jorge González (Mágico's son/half-brother of Rodrigo and Jorge W.)
- Juan Ramón Sánchez, Ramón Sánchez (son)
- Óscar Ulloa Sr., Óscar Ulloa Jr., Ricardo Ulloa (sons)
- Eriq Zavaleta (see (United States) Greg Vanney)

== Fiji ==
- Al-Taaf Sahib, Mira Sahib (brother)
- Epeli Saukuru, Iosefo Verevou (brother)
- Ifraz Mohammed, (Australia) Moustafa Mohammed (son)

== Grenada ==
- Delroy Facey, Danny Facey (brother) (Montserrat) Anthony Griffith (cousin)
- Antonio German, Ricky German (brother)
- Anthony Modeste, Patrick Modeste (brother)

== Guadeloupe ==
- Jocelyn Angloma (see France)
- Stéphane Auvray, (Trinidad and Tobago) Kaïlé Auvray (son)
- Stevenson Casimir, (Haiti) Josué Casimir (brother)
- Yohann Thuram-Ulien (see (France) Lilian Thuram)
- Ronald Zubar, Stéphane Zubar (brother), (France) Claude Dielna (cousin)

== Guam ==
- Shawn Nicklaw, Travis Nicklaw (brother)
- Alex Lee, Justin Lee (twin brother), Nate Lee (brother)

== Guatemala ==
- Ricardo Jérez Sr, Ricardo Jérez Jr (son)
- Armando Melgar, Pablo Melgar (see (Chile) Rolando Torino)
- María Amanda Monterroso, Coralia Monterroso (sister)

== Haiti ==
- Derrick Etienne, Darrell Etienne (twin brother), Derick Etienne Jr. & Omre Etienne (sons of Derrick), Danielle Étienne & Darice Etienne (daughters of Derrick), Darrell Etienne Jr. & Yien Etienne (sons of Darrell)
- Joseph-Marion Leandré, Fritz Leandré (brother)
- Henry Picault, Leslie Picault (son), Fafà Picault (grandson)
- Guy Saint-Vil, Roger Saint-Vil (brother)

== Honduras ==
- Ricardo Barrios, Alex Güity (half-brother)
- Wilmer Crisanto, Félix Crisanto (cousin)
- Edder Delgado, Juan Delgado (brother)
- Osman Elis Sr., Osman Elis Jr., Alberth Elis (sons)
- Juan Carlos Espinoza, Nahúm Espinoza (brother)
- Maynor Figueroa, (United States) Keyrol Figueroa (son)
- Milton Palacios, Jerry Palacios, Wilson Palacios, Johnny Palacios, Edwin Palacios (brothers)
- Luis Ramos, Anthony Lozano (half-brother)
- Edwin Solano, Julián Martínez (brother)
- René Suazo, Maynor Suazo (son), Nicolás Suazo, David Suazo, Rubén Suazo, Henry Suazo(nephews), Hendry Thomas (nephew), Marel Álvarez Sr.(cousin-nephew of David Suazo and bros), Marel Álvarez Jr. (son of Marel Sr.) Luis Suazo (son of David)

== Hong Kong ==
- Lee Wai Lim, Lee Hong Lim (brother)
- Leung Kwun Chung, Leung Nok Hang (brother)
- Michael Udebuluzor (see (Nigeria) Cornelius Udebuluzor)

== India ==
- Subrata Bhattacharya, Sunil Chhetri (son-in-law), (Nepal) Sushila Chhetri (mother of Sunil), Kharga B. Chhetri (father of Sunil)
- Michael Soosairaj, Michael Regin (brother)
- Syed Abdul Rahim, Syed Shahid Hakim (son)
- Jeakson Singh Thounaojam, Kritina Devi Thounaojam (sister), Amarjit Singh Kiyam (cousin)
- Pradip Kumar Banerjee, Prasun Banerjee (brother)
- Prabhsukhan Singh Gill, Gursimrat Singh Gill (brother)
- Pragyan Gogoi, Parthib Gogoi (brother)
- Jarnail Singh, Jagmohan Singh (son)
- Syed Sabir Pasha, Syed Suhail Pasha (son)
- Santosh Kashyap, Sameer Kashyap (son)

== Indonesia ==
- Maman Abdurrahman, Egi Melgiansyah (brother)
- Zaenal Arief, Yandi Munawar (brother)
- Irfan Bachdim, Kim Kurniawan (brother-in-law)
- Titus Bonai, Arthur Bonai (brother)
- Tonnie Cusell, Stefano Lilipaly (cousin)
- Yusuf Ekodono, Fandi Utomo, Wahyu Suboseto (sons)
- Oktafianus Fernando, Marselino Ferdinan (brother)
- Rezaldi Hehanussa, Al Hamra Hehanussa (brother)
- Bagas Kaffa, Bagus Kahfi (twin brother)
- Indra Kahfi, Andritany Ardhiyasa (brother)
- Achmad Kurniawan, Kurnia Meiga (brother)
- Ramdani Lestaluhu, Rafid Lestaluhu (brother), Abduh Lestaluhu (Rafid's twin brother), and Pandi Lestaluhu (brother)
- Yustinus Pae, Victor Pae (brother)
- Ansar Razak, Asnawi Mangkualam, Sulthan Zaky (nephews)
- Yakob Sayuri, Yance Sayuri (twin brother)
- Timo Scheunemann, Brandon Scheunemann (son), Claudia Scheunemann (niece)
- Ortizan Solossa, Nehemia Solossa, Boaz Solossa (brothers)
- Bejo Sugiantoro, Rachmat Irianto (son)
- Izaac Wanggai, Patrich Wanggai (brother), Imanuel Wanggai (cousin)
- Zulham Zamrun, Zulvin Zamrun (twin brother)
- Gian Zola, Beckham Putra (brother)

== Iran ==
- Ahmad Reza Abedzadeh, Amir Abedzadeh (son)
- Ali Danaeifard, Iraj Danaeifard (son)
- Andranik Eskandarian, (United States) Alecko Eskandarian (son)
- Mehrdad Mohammadi, Milad Mohammadi (twin brother)
- Serjik Teymourian, Andranik Teymourian (brother)
- Jamshid Nassiri, (India) Kiyan Nassiri (son)

== Iraq ==
- Khalil Allawi, Karim Allawi (brother)
- Adnan Dirjal, Muhannad Darjal (son)
- Ali Kadhim, Ali Adnan (nephew)
- Mustafa Mohammed, Muntadher Mohammed (brother)
- Hisham Ali Al-Rawi, (Qatar) Bassam Al-Rawi, (Qatar) Ahmed Al-Rawi (sons)
- Suhail Saber, (Qatar) Ahmed Suhail, (Qatar) Rami Suhail (sons)

== Israel ==
- Sami Abu Fani, Mohammad Abu Fani (son)
- Dori Arad, Ofri Arad (brother)
- Reuven Atar, Roi Atar (son)
- Eyal Berkovic, Nir Berkovic (brother)
- Alon Brumer, Gadi Brumer (twin brother)
- Jacob Buzaglo, Ohad Buzaglo, Asi Buzaglo, Maor Buzaglo, Almog Buzaglo (sons), Avi Nimni (Maor's wife's uncle)
- Avi Cohen, Tamir Cohen (son)
- Mu'nas Dabbur, Anas Dabour (brother)
- Eli Dasa, Or Dasa (brother)
- Baruch Dego, Messay Dego (brother)
- Yehoshua Feigenbaum, Ronen Feigenbaum (son)
- Albert Gazal, Ravid Gazal (son)
- Dan Glazer, Tamir Glazer, Amit Glazer (brothers, twins), Daniel Peretz (cousin)
- Mahmoud Jaber (see (Palestine) Abdallah Jaber)
- Gad Machnes, Oded Machnes (twin brother)
- Baruch Maman, Hanan Maman (son)
- Danny Nir'on, Omer Nir'on (son)
- Haim Revivo, David Revivo, Shay Revivo (brothers), Roy Revivo (son)
- Ronny Rosenthal, Lior Rosenthal (brother), Tom Rosenthal (son)
- Itzhak Shum, Idan Shum (son)
- Toto Tamuz (see (Nigeria) Clement Temile)
- Shalom Tikva, Avi Tikva (brother)

== Jamaica ==
- Nathaniel Adamolekun, Olufolasade Adamolekun (sister)
- Giles Barnes (see (England) Bobby Barnes)
- Craig Butler, Kevaughn Atkinson, Leon Bailey (stepsons), Kyle Butler (son)
- Malikae Dayes, Mikayla Dayes (twin)
- Robbie Earle, (England) Otis Earle (son)
- Orville Edwards, Kemar Lawrence (son)
- Simon Ford (see (Nigeria) Lawrence Wabara)
- Ricardo Gardner, Che Gardner
- Marlee Fray, Ian Fray (brother)
- Kenroy Howell, Ramone Howell (brother)
- David Johnson, (Wales) Brennan Johnson (son)
- Onandi Lowe, Damion Lowe (son)
- Kayla McKenna, (Scotland) Ciaran McKenna (husband)
- Nyron Nosworthy, Ethan Pinnock (cousin)
- Neville Oxford, (England) Reece Oxford (grandson of brother)
- Atlanta Primus (see (England) Linvoy Primus)
- Odin Samuels-Smith, (England) Ishé Samuels-Smith (twin brother)
- Greg Simmonds, Kameron Simmonds, Nicholas Simmonds (children)
- Fitzroy Simpson, (England) Jordan Simpson (son)
- Frank Sinclair, (England) Tyrese Sinclair (son)
- Drew Spence (see (England) Lewwis Spence)
- Allyson Swaby, Chantelle Swaby (sister)
- Giselle Washington, Solai Washington (sister)
- Siobhan Wilson (see (England) Clive Wilson)
- Dennis Ziadie, Christopher Ziadie and Craig Ziadie (sons), (United States) Mark Chung (cousin of Craig)

== Japan ==
- Daiki Hashioka, Kazuki Hashioka (brother)
- Yasutoshi Miura, Kazuyoshi Miura (brother)
- Gōtoku Sakai, Noriyoshi Sakai (brother)

== Jordan ==
- Stephanie Al-Naber, Yousef Al-Naber (brother)
- Bashar Bani Yaseen, Anas Bani Yaseen (uncle son)

== Kazakhstan ==
- Peter Neustädter, (Russia) Roman Neustädter (son)

== Kyrgyzstan ==
- Ildar Amirov, Ruslan Amirov (brother)
- Kai Merk, Kimi Merk (brother)

== Lebanon ==
- Fadi Alloush, Hiba Allouch (daughter)
- Levon Altounian, Manuel Altounian (brother)
- Roda Antar, Faisal Antar (brother)
- Ahmad El Choum, Sami El Choum (brother)
- Bilal Hachem, Yehia Hachem (brother)
- Jamal Al Haj, Ali Al Haj (son)
- Salim Hamze, Jouana Hamze (niece)
- Mohammad Kassas, Ali Kassas (son)
- Pilar Khoury, Ralph Khoury (cousin)
- Samy Merheg (see (Colombia) Leonardo Enciso)
- Alexander Michel Melki, Felix Michel Melki (brother)
- Ahmad Moghrabi, Akram Moghrabi (brother)
- Jadir Morgenstern (see (Brazil) Jorge Morgenstern)
- Joan Oumari, Hassan Oumari (brother)
- Emile Rustom, Paul Rustom (son)
- Hussein Tahan, Mohamad Zein Tahan (brother)
- Haitham Zein, Mahdi Zein (nephew)

== Macau ==
- Paulo Conde, Alexandre Matos (son)

== Malaysia ==
- Aidil Zafuan Abdul Radzak, Zaquan Adha Abdul Radzak (twin brother)
- Zainal Abidin Hassan, Zaiza Zainal Abidin (son)
- Ali Bakar, Isa Bakar (brother)
- Natxo Insa, Kiko Insa (brother)
- Lim Teong Kim, Damien Lim (nephew)
- Syamsul Saad, Shahrizal Saad (brother), Shahrul Saad (brother)

== Mali ==
- Gaye Alassane, (Singapore) Sameer Alassane (son)

== Martinique ==
- Grégory Arnolin, (Portugal) Jordan Arnolin (son)
- Johan Audel (see (France) Thierry Audel)
- Théo De Percin (see (France) Francis De Percin)
- Richard Massolin, (France) Yanis Massolin (son)
- Fabrice Reuperné, Enrick Reuperné (son)
- Yann Thimon, Yordan Thimon (brother)

== Mexico ==
- Guillermo Aguilar Álvarez Sr., Guillermo Aguilar Álvarez Jr. (son)
- Luís Roberto Alves (see (Brazil) Zague)
- Félix Araujo, Néstor Araujo (brother)
- Tomás Balcázar, Javier Hernández Sr. (son-in-law), Javier Hernández Jr. (son of Javier Sr.)
- Nery Castillo (see (Uruguay) Nery Castillo Sr.)
- Paulo Chávez, Mateo Chávez (son)
- George Corral, Charlyn Corral (sister)
- Leonardo Cuéllar, Christopher Cuéllar< (son)
- Renae Cuéllar, (United States) Carlos Alvarez (husband), Efraín Álvarez (brother-in-law, brother of Carlos)
- Flavio Davino, Duilio Davino (see (Argentina) Jorge Davino)
- Javier de la Torre, Eduardo de la Torre (son), Chepo de la Torre, Néstor de la Torre (nephews/cousins of Eduardo)
- Antonio de Nigris, Aldo de Nigris (brother)
- Giovani dos Santos, Jonathan dos Santos (see (Brazil) Zizinho)
- Ignacio Flores, Luis Flores (brother)
- Mónica Flores, Sabrina Flores (twin sister)
- Rubén Flores, Silvana Flores (daughter), (Canada) Marcelo Flores (son), Tatiana Flores (daughter)
- Rogelio Funes Mori (see (Argentina) Ramiro Funes Mori)
- Benjamín Galindo Sr., Benjamín Galindo Jr. (son)
- Rafael Garza Gutiérrez, Francisco Garza Gutiérrez (brother)
- Christian Giménez, Santiago Giménez (son)
- Jonathan Gómez (see (United States) Johan Gomez)
- Armando González Bejarano, Armando "Hormiga" González (son)
- Mauro Lainez, Diego Lainez (brother)
- Miguel Layún, José Abella (cousin)
- Gerardo Lugo, Édgar Lugo (son)
- Rafael Márquez Sr., Rafael Márquez Jr. (son), Luis Márquez (Rafael's cousin) Santiago Márquez (grandson, son of Rafael Márquez Jr.)
- Freddy Martín, Henry Martín (brother)
- Gilberto Mora Sr, Gilberto Mora Jr (son)
- Ramón Morales, Carlos Morales (brother)
- Luis Antonio Orozco, Luis Orozco, Javier Orozco (sons)
- Luis Pérez, Mario Pérez (son)
- Verónica Pérez, Amanda Pérez (sister)
- Onay Pineda, Orbelín Pineda (brother)
- Alfonso Portugal, Héctor Sánchez (father-in-law of Alfonso's daughter), Hugo Sánchez Sr. (son-in-law/son of Héctor), (Spain) Hugo Sánchez Jr. (grandson/son of Hugo Sr.), Horacio Sánchez (nephew of Hugo Sr.)
- José Luis Puente, Rafael Puente Sr., Santiago Puente Sr. (brothers), Rafael Puente Jr. (nephew/son of Rafael Sr.), Santiago Puente Jr. (nephew/son of Santiago Sr.)
- Luis Regueiro (see (Spain) Corso)
- Salvador Reyes Sr., Salvador Reyes Jr. (son)
- Anika Rodríguez, Karina Rodríguez (sister)
- Felipe Rosas, Manuel Rosas, Juan Rosas (brothers)
- Carlos Salcedo (see (Uruguay) Nicolás Vikonis)
- José Sánchez, (Canada) Isidro Sánchez (son)
- Luis Alonso Sandoval, Santiago Sandoval (son)
- Alfredo Tena, Luis Fernando Tena (brother)
- José Vantolrá (see (Spain) Martí Ventolrà)
- Alejandro Vela, Carlos Vela (brother)
- Cesáreo Victorino Sr., Cesáreo Victorino Jr. (son)

== Montserrat ==
- Tesfaye Bramble, (England) Titus Bramble (brother)
- Dajour Buffonge, (England) DJ Buffonge (brother)
- Lenni Cirino, Raff Cirino (brother)
- Wayne Dyer, (England) Lloyd Dyer (brother)
- Matty Willock, (England) Chris Willock, (England) Joe Willock (brothers)

== Myanmar ==
- Maung Maung Soe, Win Moe Kyaw (brother)

== New Caledonia ==
- Georges Gope-Fenepej, John Gope-Fenepej (brother)

== New Zealand ==
- Ken Armstrong, Ron Armstrong (son), Brian Armstrong (son), Bridgette Armstrong (granddaughter, daughter of Ron)
- Jenny Bindon, Tyler Bindon (son)
- Dave Bright, Kris Bright (son), Rory Turner (Kris's half-brother)
- Michael Boxall, Nikko Boxall (brother)
- Clive Campbell, Jeff Campbell (son)
- Sara Clapham, Aaron Clapham (brother)
- Barbara Cox, Michele Cox (daughter), Tara Cox (daughter)
- Fred de Jong, Andre de Jong (son)
- Priscilla Duncan, Katie Duncan (wife)
- Declan Edge, Harry Edge (son), Jesse Edge (nephew)
- Kevin Fallon, Rory Fallon (son)
- Rodger Gray, Christian Gray (son)
- Frank van Hattum, Grazia MacIntosh, Marie-Jose Cooper (siblings), Oskar van Hattum (nephew)
- Jai Ingham, Dane Ingham (brother)
- Michael McGarry, James McGarry (son)
- Bert Ormond, (Scotland) Willie Ormond (brother), Ian Ormond (son), Duncan Ormond (son), Vicki Ormond (granddaughter, daughter of Duncan)
- Michael Ridenton, Matthew Ridenton (son)
- Shane Rufer, Wynton Rufer (brother), Caleb Rufer (son of Wynton), Alex Rufer (son of Shane)
- Vic Smith, Gordon Smith (brother), Roger Smith (brother), Ryan Nelsen (grandson of another brother, Bob Smith)
- Yvonne Vale, Jordan Vale (son)
- Chelsey Wood, Chris Wood (brother)
- Kirsty Yallop, (Australia) Tameka Yallop (née Butt) (wife)

== Pakistan ==
- Raheela Zarmeen, Shahlyla Ahmadzai (sister)
- Adil Nabi, Samir Nabi, Rahis Nabi (brothers)

== Palestine ==
- Edgardo Abdala, Joaquín Abdala (son)
- Ahmed Daghim, (Denmark) Adam Daghim (brother)
- Yashir Islame (see (Chile) Amed Pinto)
- Abdallah Jaber, (Israel) Mahmoud Jaber (brother)
- Layth Kharoub, Baraa Kharoub, Oday Kharoub (brother)
- Shehab Qunbar, Zaid Qunbar (brother)

== Panama ==
- Armando Dely Valdés, Jorge Dely Valdés, Julio Dely Valdés (brothers/twins)
- Neftalí Díaz, Érick Díaz (son)
- Donaldo González, Gabriel Gómez (brother-in-law)
- Víctor René Mendieta Sr., Víctor René Mendieta Jr. (son)
- Marcos Villarreal, José Luis Rodríguez (brother)

== Papua New Guinea ==
- Selan Elizah, Pettysen Elizah (son)
- Andrew Embahe, Sonia Embahe (sister)
- Bob Morris, Rumona Morris (daughter)
- Peter Gunemba, Raymond Gunemba (son), Troy Gunemba (son), Judith Gunemba (daughter), Meagen Gunemba (daughter)
- Alwin Komolong, Felix Komolong (brother)

== Philippines ==
- Marwin Angeles, Marvin Angeles (twin)
- Yanti Barsales, Ian Araneta (nephew), Emelio Caligdong (Ian's third cousin), Alina Araneta (niece/Ian's sister)
- Anton del Rosario, Armand del Rosario (brother)
- Sara Castañeda, Anicka Castaneda (sister)
- Chris Greatwich, Phil Greatwich, Simon Greatwich (brothers)
- Ángel Guirado, Juan Luis Guirado (brother)
- Darren Hartmann, Matthew Hartmann, Mark Hartmann (brothers)
- Olivia Davies-McDaniel, Chandler McDaniel, Griffin McDaniel (siblings)
- Omid Nazari, Amin Nazari (brother)
- Ed Ocampo, Javier Gayoso (grandson)
- Manuel Ott, Mike Ott (brother), Marco Ott (brother)
- Álvaro Silva, Kike Linares (cousin)
- Jefferson Tabinas, Paul Tabinas (brother)
- Phil Younghusband, James Younghusband (brother)

== Puerto Rico ==
- Joshua Calderón, Giovanni Calderón (brother)
- Alexa Cardona, Julian Cardona (brother)
- Daphane Méndez, Jazmine Méndez (twin)

== Qatar ==
- Ibrahim Khalfan, Khalfan Ibrahim (son)
- Mohammed Yasser. Hussein Yasser, Ahmed Yasser (brothers)

== Saint Kitts and Nevis ==
- Bert Bowery, Jordan Bowery (son)
- Bobby Bowry, (Antigua and Barbuda) Daniel Bowry (son)
- Cloey Uddenberg, Kayla Uddenberg (sister), Cloey Uddenberg (sister)
- Tiran Hanley, Tishan Hanley (brother), Tahir Hanley (brother)
- Atiba Harris, (England) Micah Richards (cousin)
- Damien Kelly, (England) Kyle Kelly (son)
- Lois Maynard, (England) Marcus Rashford (cousin)
- Allison Williams, Lauren Williams (sister)

== Saint Lucia ==
- Titus Elva, Olivier Elva (brother), Caniggia Elva (son)
- Kieran Monlouis, (England) (Jamaica) Zane Monlouis (brother)

== Saint Martin ==
- Wilfried Dalmat (see (France) Stéphane Dalmat)

== Samoa ==
- Matalena Daniells, Kevin Daniells (brother)
- Johnny Hall, (New Zealand) Jai Ingham (cousin), (New Zealand) Dane Ingham (cousin/Jai's brother)

== Saudi Arabia ==
- Abdullah Al-Deayea, Mohamed Al-Deayea (brother), Sultan Al-Deayea (Abdullah's son)
- Ali Al-Hassan, Abbas Al-Hassan (brother)
- Osama Hawsawi, Omar Hawsawi (brother)
- Ali Lajami, Qassem Lajami (twin brother)

== Singapore ==
- Khairul Amri, Khairul Nizam (brother)
- Au-yeong Pak Kuan, (Austria) Daniel Au Yeong (son)
- Swandi Kitto, Adam Swandi (son)
- Zulfadhmi Suzliman, Zulqarnaen Suzliman (brother).
- Ahmad Wartam, Fandi Ahmad (son), Irfan Fandi (grandson, son of Fandi), Ikhsan Fandi (grandson, son of Fandi), Ilhan Fandi (grandson, son of Fandi)

== Solomon Islands ==
- Allan Boso, Turiti Boso (son)
- Duddley Tausinga, Abel Karina (Cousin), Spencer Manga (Cousin)

== South Korea ==
- Cha Bum-kun, Cha Du-ri (son)
- Choi Yung-keun, Choi Chung-min (brother)
- Kim Pan-keun, (Australia) Danny Kim (son)
- Lee Ki-hyung, Lee Ho-jae (son)
- Lee Eul-yong, Lee Tae-seok (son), Lee Seung-joon (brother) (sons)
- Son Woong-jung, Son Heung-min (son)

== Spain ==
- Periko Alonso, Mikel Alonso, Xabi Alonso (sons)
- Eneko Arieta, Antón Arieta (brother)
- Campanal I, Marcelino Campanal (nephew)
- Fran Carmona, Olga Carmona (sister)
- Gaztelu, Agustín Aranzábal (son)
- Paco Gento, Julio Gento and Antonio Gento (brothers), Paco Llorente (nephew of Paco, Julio and Antonio, son-in-law of Ramón Grosso), Ramón Grosso (father-in-law of Paco Llorente), Marcos Llorente (son of Paco Llorente, grandson of Ramón Grosso, great-nephew of Paco, Julio and Antonio Gento)
- Juli Gonzalvo, José Gonzalvo, Mariano Gonzalvo (brothers)
- Herrerita, Chus Herrera (son)
- Francisco Lesmes, Rafael Lesmes (brother)
- Marquitos, Marcos Alonso (son), Marcos Alonso (grandson)
- Óscar Mingueza, Ariadna Mingueza (sister)
- Óscar, Roger, Genís (brothers)
- Luis López Rekarte, Aitor López Rekarte (brother)
- Miguel Reina, Pepe Reina (son)
- Eusebio Ríos, Roberto Ríos (son)
- Txetxu Rojo, José Ángel Rojo (brother)
- Manuel Sanchís, Manolo Sanchís (son)
- Imanol Sarriegi, Oier Sarriegi (brother), Amaiur Sarriegi (sister)

== Syria ==
- Mosab Balhous, Anas Balhous (brother)
- Mouhanad Boushi, Nihad Al Boushi (brother)
- Aatef Jenyat, Amro Jenyat (brother)
- Abdul Kader Kardaghli, Ahmed Kurdughli (brother), Khaled Kourdoghli (nephew)
- Kevork Mardikian, Mardik Mardikian (son)
- Munaf Ramadan, Ammar Ramadan (son)

== Tahiti ==
- Efraín Araneda, Diego Araneda (son), (Chile) Miguel Ángel Estay (cousin)
- Erroll Bennett, Naea Bennett, Steven Bennett (sons), Marama Vahirua (Naea's cousin), (France) Pascal Vahirua (Marama's cousin)
- Eddy Kaspard (see (Vanuatu) Abet Kaspard Tahi)
- Jonathan Tehau, Alvin Tehau, Lorenzo Tehau (brothers, twins), Teaonui Tehau (cousin)

== Tajikistan ==
- Alisher Dzhalilov, Iskandar Dzhalilov, Manuchekhr Dzhalilov, Dzhakhongir Dzhalilov (brother)
- Khakim Fuzailov, Rahmatullo Fuzailov (brother)
- Dilshod Vasiev, Farkhod Vosiyev (brother)

== Thailand ==
- Samruay Chaiyong, Sa-ner Chaiyong, Sanong Chaiyong, Sa-nook Chaiyong, Supot Chaiyong, Supat Chaiyong
- Sutin Chaikitti, Surak Chaikitti (brother)
- Teraseel Dangda, Taneekarn Dangda (sister)
- Somjets Kesarat, Tanaboon Kesarat (brother)
- Pairote Pongjan, Thitipan Puangchan (son)
- Surat Sukha, Suree Sukha (twin brother)
- Supachok Sarachat, Suphanat Mueanta (brother)

== Tonga ==
- Mark Uhatahi, Sione Uhatahi (brother), Tupou Uhatahi (brother), Pita Uhatahi (brother)

== Trinidad and Tobago ==
- Ian Cox, Daniel Phillips (cousin)
- Khadidra Debesette, Khadisha Debesette (twin sister)
- Andre Fortune II, Ajani Fortune (brother)
- Nathaniel García, Levi García, Judah García (brothers), Isaiah Garcia (cousin)
- Justin Hoyte, Gavin Hoyte (brothers)
- Kelvin Jones, Marvin Jones (son), Joevin Jones (son), Alvin Jones (son)
- Wendell Moore, (United States) Shaquell Moore (son)
- David Nakhid, Ali Kazim Nakhid (son)
- Lincoln Phillips, Derek Phillips (son)
- Ross Russell Sr., Ross Russell Jr. (son)
- Scott Sealy, Dante Sealy (son)
- Silvio Spann, Silas Spann (brother)

== Turkmenistan ==
- Wladimir Baýramow, Nazar Baýramow (brother)
- Dmitri Nezhelev, Anatoli Nezhelev (brother)
- Kamil Mingazow, Ruslan Mingazow (son)

== United Arab Emirates ==
- Khaled Abdulrahman, Mohamed Abdulrahman (brother), Omar Abdulrahman (brother)
- Mohammed Salem Al-Enazi, Mohanad Salem (brother)
- Mubarak Ghanim, Khalil Ghanim (brother)
- Mohammad Omar, Zuhair Bakheet (brother)
- Khalil Sebait, Fahd Khalil (son), Fouad Khalil (son), Faisal Khalil (son), Fathi Khalil (son), Mohamed Khalil (son), Ahmed Khalil (son)
- Eissa Meer, Ibrahim Meer (twin brother)

== United States ==
- Brenden Aaronson, Paxten Aaronson (brother)
- Bruce Arena, Kenny Arena (son)
- Yael Averbuch West, Aaron West (husband), Shira Averbuch (sister)
- Walter Bahr, Casey Bahr, Chris Bahr, Matt Bahr (sons)
- Gerry Baker, (England) Joe Baker (brother), (Australia) Ryan Strain (grandson)
- Kainoa Bailey, (Philippines) Zico Bailey (brother)
- DaMarcus Beasley, Jamar Beasley (brother)
- Matt Besler, Nick Besler (brother)
- Kimberly Bingham, David Bingham (brother)
- Bob Bradley, Michael Bradley (son), (England) Andy Rose (son-in-law)
- Jim Brown, George Brown (see (Scotland) Alex Lambie)
- Teal Bunbury (see (Canada) Alex Bunbury)
- Servando Carrasco, Alex Morgan (wife)
- Mark Chung (see (Jamaica) Dennis Ziadie)
- Kenny Cooper Jr. (see (England) Kenny Cooper Sr.)
- Pedro DeBrito, John DeBrito (brother)
- Rolf Decker, Otto Decker (brother)
- Angelo DiBernardo, Paul DiBernardo (brother), Vanessa DiBernardo (daughter)
- Daryl Dike (see (Nigeria) Bright Dike)
- Alecko Eskandarian (see (Iran) Andranik Eskandarian)
- Lorrie Fair, Ronnie Fair (twin sister)
- Jesús Ferreira (see (Colombia) David Ferreira)
- William Findlay (see (Scotland) Robert Findlay)
- Mia Fishel (see (Bermuda) Andrew Bascome)
- Jim Gabarra, Carin Jennings-Gabarra (wife)
- Fabrice Gautrat, Morgan Gautrat (wife)
- Johan Gomez, Jonathan Gómez (brother)
- Phillip Gyau, Joe Gyau (see (Ghana) Nana Gyau)
- John Harkes, Ian Harkes (son)
- Chris Henderson, Sean Henderson (brother)
- Schellas Hyndman, Emerson Hyndman (grandson)
- Erhardt Kapp, Alex Kapp (son)
- Harry Keough, Ty Keough (son)
- John Kerr Jr. (see (Canada) John Kerr Sr.)
- Alexi Lalas, Greg Lalas (brother)
- Roy Lassiter, (Costa Rica) Ariel Lassiter (son)
- Sydney Leroux, Dom Dwyer (husband)
- Maurice Ligeon, (Netherlands) Ruben Ligeon (brother)
- Joe Maca, Alain Maca (son)
- Dax McCarty, Dustin McCarty (brother)
- Charlie McCully, Henry McCully (brother)
- Bart McGhee (see (Scotland) James McGhee)
- Neil Megson (see (England) Don Megson)
- Kristie Mewis, Sam Mewis (sister), (Australia) Sam Kerr (wife)
- Shaq Moore (see (Trinidad and Tobago) Wendell Moore)
- Darlington Nagbe (see (Liberia) Joe Nagbe)
- George Nanchoff, Louis Nanchoff (brother), Michael Nanchoff (son)
- Victor Nogueira, Casey Nogueira (daughter), Zach Loyd (son-in-law/Casey's husband)
- Desevio Payne, (Trinidad and Tobago) Déron Payne (brother)
- Andrés Perea (see (Colombia) Nixon Perea)
- Hugo Pérez (see (El Salvador) Hugo Pérez Sr.)
- Fafà Picault (see (Haiti) Henry Picault)
- Mark Pulisic, Christian Pulisic (son), Will Pulisic (nephew)
- Brian Quinn, Aodhan Quinn (son)
- Christie Rampone (see (Scotland) Bill Dowie)
- Megan Rapinoe, Rachael Rapinoe (twin sister)
- Harry Ratican, Peter Ratican (brother)
- Sophia Recupero, Maddie Recupero (sister), William Recupero (brother)
- Claudio Reyna, Danielle Reyna (wife), Giovanni Reyna (son)
- Cesar Roldan, Cristian Roldan, (El Salvador) Alex Roldan (brothers)
- Hugo Salcedo, Jorge Salcedo (son)
- Brandon Servania, (Puerto Rico) Jaden Servania (brother)
- Ken Snow, Steve Snow (brother)
- Archie Stark, Tommy Stark (brother)
- Larry Sullivan, Chris Albright (nephew), Quinn Sullivan, (Bangladesh) Ronan Sullivan, Cavan Sullivan (grandsons), Chris Albright (cousin of Quinn)
- Alyssa Thompson, Gisele Thompson (sister)
- Gregg Thompson, Tanner Thompson, Tommy Thompson (sons)
- Tim Twellman, Steve Twellman, Mike Twellman (brothers), Taylor Twellman (son)
- Julian Valentin, (Puerto Rico) Zarek Valentin (brother)
- Greg Vanney, (El Salvador) Eriq Zavaleta (nephew)
- Abby Wambach, Sarah Huffman (wife)
- George Weah Jr., Timothy Weah (see (Liberia) George Weah)
- Roy Wegerle, (South Africa) Steve Wegerle, (South Africa) Geoff Wegerle (brothers), Bryce Wegerle (nephew/Steve's son)
- Josh Wolff, Tyler Wolff, Owen Wolff (sons)

== Uzbekistan ==
- Ruslan Agalarov, (Russia) Kamil Agalarov (brother), (Russia) Gamid Agalarov (son)
- Dmitry An, (Soviet Union) Mikhail An (brother)
- Khikmat Khashimov, Abdukodir Khusanov (son)
- Maksim Shatskikh, (Ukraine) Mykola Shaparenko (son-in-law)

== Vanuatu ==
- Michel Kaltak, Jean Kaltak (brother), Brian Kaltak (cousin)
- Abet Kaspard Tahi, (French Polynesia) Eddy Kaspard (son)

== Vietnam ==
- Bùi Tiến Dũng, Bùi Tiến Dụng (brother)
- Hồ Ngọc Thắng, Phạm Hoàng Quỳnh (wife)
- Hoàng Danh Ngọc, Hoàng Nhật Nam (twin brother)
- Lê Khắc Chính (father), Lê Đức Tuấn (son)
- Nguyễn Công Phượng, Nguyễn Thái Quốc Cường (cousin)
- Nguyễn Văn Thìn (father), Nguyễn Thế Anh, Nguyễn Cao Cường (sons)
- Phạm Trung Hiếu, Châu Thị Vang (wife)
- Quế Ngọc Mạnh, Quế Ngọc Hải (brother)
- Trần Đình Kha, Trần Đình Khương (brother)
- Trần Thị Phương Thảo, Trần Thị Thu Thảo (twin sister)
- Trần Văn Khánh (uncle), Trần Tiến Anh, Trần Anh Đức (nephews)
- Văn Sỹ Chi (father), Văn Sỹ Sơn, Văn Sỹ Hùng, Văn Sỹ Thủy (sons), Nguyễn Bá Dương, Văn Sỹ Phong (grandsons)
- Võ Ngọc Đức, Võ Ngọc Toàn (twin brother)

== See also ==
- List of professional sports families
- List of family relations in American football
  - List of second-generation National Football League players
- List of association football (soccer) families
  - List of African association football families
  - List of European association football families
    - List of English association football families
    - List of former Yugoslavia association football families
    - List of Scottish football families
    - List of Spanish association football families
  - Category:Association football families
- List of Australian rules football families
- List of second-generation Major League Baseball players
- List of second-generation National Basketball Association players
- List of boxing families
- List of chess families
- List of International cricket families
- List of family relations in the National Hockey League
- List of family relations in rugby league
- List of international rugby union families
- List of professional wrestling families
