= List of Chile international footballers born outside Chile =

This is a list of Chile international footballers born outside their country.

== Naturalised players ==
According to the current or previous Chilean nationality laws, the following players who were born outside Chile and have played (or have been part of any squad) for Chile national team are considered on two terms about his naturalisation:

- By descent: Players who any of their parents or grandparents are/were Chilean through the principle of jus soli or naturalisation.
- By residence: Players who have kept a permanent residence in Chile.

=== By descent ===
Players in bold are still active, at least at club level.
Caps includes non A-Class matches.

Name	Birthplace	Another nationality	Position	Obtained citizenship date	Career	Caps	Goals
**Gabriel Arias**	(Argentina) Neuquén		Goalkeeper	2015	2018–2024	19	0
**Luciano Cabral**	(Argentina) General Alvear, Mendoza		Midfielder		2024–2025	3	0
Gustavo Canales	(Argentina) General Roca, Río Negro		Striker	2010	2011	1	0
**Matías Catalán**	(Argentina) Mar del Plata		Defender		2023–2024	9	0
Matías Fernández	(Argentina) Merlo, Buenos Aires		Midfielder	1990	2005–2018	74	14
Pablo Hernández	(Argentina) Tucumán		Midfielder	2013	2014–2019	30	3
**Lautaro Millán**	(Argentina) Bahía Blanca		Midfielder		2025–	4	0
**Ulises Ortegoza**	(Argentina) San Nicolás de los Arroyos		Midfielder		2024–	1	0
Daniel Pérez	(Argentina) Trelew, Chubut		Forward		2003–2005	2	0
Francisco Ugarte	(Argentina) Mendoza		Midfielder		1987–1988	6	0
**Nayel Mehssatou**	(Belgium) Brussels	(Morocco)	Midfielder		2022–2023	8	0
Francisco Arrué	(Brazil) São Paulo		Midfielder		2006	1	0
Marcos González	(Brazil) Rio de Janeiro		Defender		2003–2014	29	2
Paulo Magalhães	(Brazil) Porto Alegre		Defender		2011–2013	2	0
Jaime Lo Presti	(Canada) Vancouver		Defender		1995	1	0
**Joaquín Montecinos**	(Colombia) Barranquilla		Midfielder		2021–2022	11	0
**Ben Brereton Díaz**	(England) Stoke-on-Trent		Forward	December 2020	2021–	45	10
**Lawrence Vigouroux**	(England) Camden	(Jamaica)	Goalkeeper	2013	2018–	12	0
**Niklas Castro**	(Norway) Oslo		Forward	2020	2019	1	0
Mark González	(South Africa) Durban		Winger		2003–2016	56	6
**Miiko Albornoz**	(Sweden) Stockholm	(Finland)	Defender	2013	2014–2019	14	2
**Nils Reichmuth**	(Switzerland) Zug		Midfielder		2026–	3	0
Francisco Urroz	(Venezuela) Higuerote		Defender		1947–1950	11	0
Jorge Valdivia	(Venezuela) Maracay		Midfielder		2004–2017	78	7

==== Players with only youth caps ====
- Alí Manouchehri (born in Vienna, Austria) (2005)
- **Vicente Reyes** (born in Charleston, South Carolina, United States) (2024–2025)
- Mauricio Viana (born in São Paulo, Brazil) (2011–2012)
- **Zidane Yáñez** (born in Union, New Jersey, United States) (2026)

=== By residence ===
Players in bold are still active, at least at club level.
Caps includes non A-Class matches.

Name	Birthplace	Another nationality	Position	Obtained citizenship date	Career	Caps	Goals
Rodolfo Almeida	(Argentina) Buenos Aires		Midfielder		1954–1960	25	0
Ernesto Álvarez	(Argentina) Fuentes, Santa Fe		Striker	1963	1963	1	0
Colin Campbell	(Argentina) Buenos Aires	(Scotland)	Striker		1910	4	2
**Fernando de Paul**	(Argentina) Álvarez, Santa Fe		Goalkeeper	14 June 2016	2018–2022	2	0
Javier di Gregorio	(Argentina) Mendoza		Goalkeeper		2007	1	0
Óscar Fabbiani	(Argentina) Buenos Aires		Striker	21 September 1979	1979	4	0
Salvador Nocetti	(Argentina) Buenos Aires		Midfielder	1940	1940	2	0
Jorge Spedaletti	(Argentina) Rosario, Santa Fe		Striker	1974	1975–1977	6	0
Sergio Vargas	(Argentina) Chacabuco, Buenos Aires		Goalkeeper	April 2001	2001	10	0
**Matías Zaldivia**	(Argentina) San Isidro, Buenos Aires		Defender	6 December 2021	2023	1	0
**Fernando Zampedri**	(Argentina) Chajarí		Striker	19 February 2025	2025	2	0
Hernán Bolaños	(Nicaragua) Granada	(Costa Rica)	Forward		1940	3	0
José Balbuena	(Peru) Lima		Forward	1945	1947	1	0
Segundo Castillo	(Peru) Callao		Midfielder		1941	1	0
Pablo Pasache	(Peru) Ica		Midfielder		1941	1	0
Eduardo De Saa	(Spain) Lugo	(Argentina)	Defender	1941	1941	?	?
Juan Legarreta	(Spain) Irún		Defender		1921	2	0
Francisco Molina	(Spain) Súria		Midfielder	1942	1953–1959	8	8
Ramón Unzaga	(Spain) Bilbao		Midfielder	1910	1916–1920	9	1

==== Players with no caps ====
- **Leandro Benegas** (born in Mendoza, Argentina) (2020)
- **Omar Carabalí** (born in Guayaquil, Ecuador) (2020)
- Daniel Morón (born in Tunuyán, Argentina) (1995–1996)

== Possible cases ==
At the beginning, from 1910 to 1913, the Chile National Team squad was made up of Chilean and British citizens, but there is no further information about each player. The following players were probably born in the UK or another country such as Colin Campbell. However, it is possible they were only of British descent:

Goalkeepers:

- Leonard Gibson (Leonard Claude Gibson Yelli) (4 caps)
- Pablo Woitas (Pablo Woitas Dorgan) (1 cap)
- Roy Lester (1 cap)

Defenders:

- John McWilliam (John Fraser McWilliam Stroyan a.k.a. J. MacWilliams) (2 caps)
- Edward Ash (Edward John Heneage Ash Potts a.k.a. E. F. Ashe) (3 caps)
- Humberto Bardi (Humberto Bardi Cárdenas a.k.a. Bardie) (1 cap)
- Walter Forgie (1 cap)
- Harold Dean (1 cap)

Midfielders:

- William Hoy (William John Hoy McCann a.k.a. Andrés Hoyl) (2 caps)
- Henry Allen (Henry Allen Harrison) (3 caps)
- Alberto Lewis (1 cap)
- Otto Eikhof (Otto Andreas Cornils Eikhof Deertz a.k.a. Eickoff) (1 cap)

Forwards:

- George Simmons (George Francis Simmons Henshaw a.k.a. Frank Simmons) (3 caps, 1 goal)
- John Davidson (John Philip Davidson Galloway a.k.a. J. P. Davidson) (3 caps)
- John Hamilton (John Hamilton Smith a.k.a. Juan H. Hamilton) (3 caps)
- José Robson (José Sloan Robson Cameron a.k.a. Joseph Robson) (3 caps)
- Herbert Sturgess (Herbert Charles Sturgess Sant a.k.a. Heriberto Sturgess) (1 cap)
- Norman Loades (1 cap)
- J. Johnstone (1 cap)
- Alexander Skewes (1 cap)

== See also ==
- Football in Chile
- List of Chile international footballers
- Chile national football team records and statistics
