= Víctor Villalón =

Bolivian footballer

Personal information
- Full name: Víctor Eduardo Villalón Bernal
- Date of birth: 25 October 1950 (age 76)
- Place of birth: Maitenes, Puchuncaví, Chile
- Position: Defender

Youth career
- Everton
- José 'Peta' Fernández

Senior career*
Years	Team	Apps	(Gls)
1968–1971	Enami de Concón		
1970	Concón (city team)		
1970	Quintero (city team)		
1971–1973	Antofagasta Portuario	61	(0)
1974	Jorge Wilstermann		
1975	Aurora		(9)
1975–1976	Jorge Wilstermann		
1977–1979	Deportivo Bata		
1980–1982	Jorge Wilstermann		
1983	Blooming		
1984–1986	Jorge Wilstermann		

International career
1977	Bolivia	2	(0)

Managerial career
- 1992–1994: Metalsan
- Esparta
- 1999–2000: Deportivo San Pedro
- 2011–2012: Real Mamoré (assistant)
- Funika U19
- * Club domestic league appearances and goals

Víctor Eduardo Villalón Bernal (born 25 October 1950) is a former football defender who played for clubs in Chile and Bolivia. Born in Chile, he represented Bolivia internationally.

== Club career ==
=== Early career ===
Born in Maitenes, Puchuncaví, Chile, as a youth player, Villalón was with Everton de Viña del Mar playing as a forward. Because of long trips to train with them, he switched to club José 'Peta' Fernández in his hometown.

=== In Chile ===
At the age of seventeen, he joined club Enami from Concón, winning the title of the second division of 1968 Campeonato Regional Central (Central Regional Championship) and staying with them until 1971. In 1970, he took part of the teams of both Concón and Quintero in the qualifiers for the 1970 ANFA national championship in Santa Cruz, qualifying and reaching the third place in the tournament with Quintero.

In 1971, he joined Antofagasta Portuario with Paco Molina as coach and Luis Hernán Álvarez as sport manager, taking part of the squad for three seasons in the Chilean top division.

=== In Bolivia ===
In 1973, as a player of Antofagasta Portuario, Villalón faced Jorge Wilstermann in Bolivia. In 1974, he left Chile and joined the Bolivian club for the 1974 Copa Libertadores, coinciding with his compatriot Hugo Bravo. He was in three other stints with them: in the second half of 1975, 1980 to 1982 and 1984 to 1986, winning the league titles in 1980 and 1981. In 1980, he coincided with the successful Brazilian player Jairzinho.

In the first half of 1975, he played for Aurora, becoming the runner-up in the regional championship of Cochabamba having scored nine goals and taking part in the Copa Simón Bolívar.

In 1977, he joined Deportivo Bata in the first season of the Bolivian Primera División, staying with them until 1979.

In 1983, he played for Blooming, winning the league title of the top division, with the Chilean manager Raúl Pino.

He retired in 1986 as a player of Jorge Wilstermann after suffering an ACL injury in a match against Aurora.

== International career ==
Naturalized Bolivian by residence in late 1974, Villalón represented the Bolivia national team in the Inter-confederation play-offs for the 1978 FIFA World Cup against Hungary, losing both matches. In the squad, another naturalized players took part: Arturo and Luis Galarza, brothers from Paraguay and René Domingo Taritolay, Héctor Horacio Auad and Luis Bastida from Argentina. Previously, he took part of another unofficial matches in Budapest, Hungary, and Düsseldorf, Germany.

He is the first Chilean to represent another country with no blood ties.

== Coaching career ==
Subsequently, his retirement, he led club Metalsan, Esparta and Deportivo San Pedro from Cochabamba and was the assistant of Sergio Luna in Real Mamoré. At youth level, he has coached de under-19 squad of Fundación Intikallpanchis (Funika).

== Personal life ==
Villalón is of Mapuche descent.

He married the Bolivian Martha Siles Revollo and they have three sons: Jorge, Diego and Víctor Jr.
