= Mano (footballer, born 1898) =

Brazilian footballer

Personal information
- Full name: Emmanuel Coelho Neto
- Date of birth: 28 July 1898
- Place of birth: Rio de Janeiro, Brazil
- Date of death: 30 September 1922 (aged 24)
- Place of death: Rio de Janeiro, Brazil
- Position: Forward

Senior career*
Years	Team	Apps	(Gls)
1915–1922	Fluminense	73	(10)
- * Club domestic league appearances and goals as of 10 November 2025

Emmanuel Coelho Neto (28 July 1898 – 30 September 1922), better known as Mano, was a Brazilian professional footballer who played as a forward for Fluminense. Mano was son of the writer Coelho Neto and brother of the international Brazilian footballer Preguinho.

== Career ==
Mano began his football career in the first decade of the 20th century, encouraged by the fact that his family lived on a plot of land near the Estádio das Laranjeiras, a circumstance that also led his brothers Georges, Paulo, and João (Preguinho) to develop as players at the club. He played for the Fluminense FC first squad from 1915 to 1922. On 18 July 1922, during a match against São Cristóvão FR, he suffered severe abdominal trauma that sidelined him from further play. He died on 30 September from sepsis resulting from that injury. The following day, the Brazil national team then competing in the 1922 South American Championship wore black armbands in mourning during their match against Uruguay.

== Honours ==
Fluminense

- Campeonato Carioca: 1917, 1918, 1919
