= Ary Patusca =

Brazilian footballer

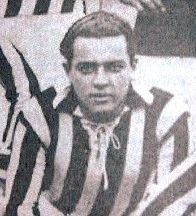

Personal information
- Full name: Ary Patusca
- Date of birth: 1892
- Place of birth: Santos, Brazil
- Date of death: 4 December 1923 (aged 30–31)
- Place of death: Santos, Brazil
- Position: Forward

Senior career*
Years	Team	Apps	(Gls)
1911–1915	SC Brühl		
1915	Inter Milan		
1915–1918	Santos		
1919	Flamengo		
1919–1922	Santos		
- * Club domestic league appearances and goals as of 10 September 2023

Ary Patusca (1892 – 4 December 1923), was a Brazilian footballer who played as a forward.

== Career ==
At the beginning of the 1910s, Ary went to study accounting in the University of St. Gallen, Switzerland. With football running through his veins, Patusca ended up becoming a player at SC Brühl. He was successful for the club, eventually becoming Swiss champion, being one of the first Brazilian champions in a European club. Patusca caught the attention and went to Inter Milan, but at his father's request he returned to Santos FC in the end of 1915, where he was top scorer of the 1916 Campeonato Paulista. For Santos FC, Ary scored 103 goals in 85 games.

== Personal life ==
Ary was son of Sizino Patusca, the first Santos FC president, brother of Araken Patusca and cousin of Arnaldo da Silveira.

== Honours ==
SC Brühl

- Swiss Serie A: 1914–15

Individual

- 1916 Campeonato Paulista top scorer.

== Death ==
Ary died at the age of 31, in Santos
