= Octávio Felinto Neto =

Brazilian footballer

Octávio
Personal information
- Full name: Octávio Felinto Neto
- Position: Midfielder

Youth career
- Litoral FC
- Santos
- 2007–2009: Athletico Paranaense
- 2010–2011: Paraná
- 2011–2013: São Paulo
- 2013: Osasco
- 2014: Independente de Limeira

Senior career*
Years	Team	Apps	(Gls)
2015	Guarani-MG	0	(0)
Total		0	(0)
- * Club domestic league appearances and goals

Octávio Felinto Neto is a Brazilian former footballer who played as a midfielder.

== Early life ==
Octávio was born to Sandra Regina Arantes, the illegitimate daughter of Brazilian football legend Pelé. The former Brazilian international forward only recognised her as his daughter after a lengthy court case, spanning five years from 1991 to 1996, something Octávio did not find out until he was thirteen years old. He met his grandfather face-to-face on two occasions; during the first encounter, Pelé gave him his blessing, but the second and final meeting came as Pelé lay in a hospital bed on 28 December 2022, a day before his death.

In October 2013, Octávio and his brother, Gabriel Arantes do Nascimento, took their grandfather to court, seeking further compensation for his failure to recognise their mother as his daughter, stating that they were unable to afford school fees. The court sided in favour of the brothers, with Pelé being told to pay alimony.

== Footballing career ==
Octávio started his footballing career at the age of five, at the Escolinha do Literol, before playing futsal for his grandfather's former team, Santos. Following the death of his mother in 2006, his father moved Octávio and his brother to Curitiba, and he joined the academy of Athletico Paranaense. Before joining Athletico Paranaense, he had trialed at Santos' youth football team, but these trials were ultimately unsuccessful, with a former coach stating in 2012 that Octávio "did not reach the technical level necessary to join the squad". He and his brother had also received offers from Corinthians, a rival of Santos, but their father, Ozéas, decided against the move - citing the pressure of being related to Pelé, who scored more goals in his career against Corinthians than any other club, as being too much.

He began to take football more seriously following the move to Curitiba, and was again invited to trial with Santos while playing for Paraná in 2010. He received national attention for a goal he scored while playing for Paraná in 2011. This viral goal led to a contract offer from São Paulo, and the brothers joined in 2011. After a year with São Paulo, the two brothers stopped training with the club, despite being under contract, and their contracts were terminated in February 2013. He also went on to play for Osasco and Independente de Limeira.

In November 2014, Guarani de Divinópolis announced that Octávio would join them ahead of the 2015 Campeonato Mineiro campaign. His father accompanied him to sign his first professional contract in February 2015, as he was still a minor. He appeared once on the bench for Guarani, but did not feature in a 3–1 Campeonato Mineiro home loss to Cruzeiro. He spent time on trial with Cruzeiro later in the year, but ultimately did not play professionally during his career, having suffered two consecutive injuries before the age of nineteen.

== Later life ==
Having stepped away from football, he led youth groups at an evangelical church in Osasco, and entered law school in early 2017. As of January 2023, he works as a managing partner of Arantes Do Nascimento Sports.
