= Renzo Guevara =

Peruvian footballer (born 1983)

Personal information
- Full name: Renzo Junior Guevara Avalos
- Date of birth: 2 September 1983 (age 43)
- Place of birth: Lima, Peru
- Height: 1.69 m (5 ft 7 in)
- Position: Full-back

Team information
- Current team: UTC

Senior career*
Years	Team	Apps	(Gls)
2003–2004	Sport Boys		
2005–2006	Unión Huaral		
2007	Total Clean	19	(1)
2008–2011	José Gálvez	81	(2)
2012–	UTC		
- * Club domestic league appearances and goals as of 10 May 2012

Renzo Junior Guevara Avalos (born 2 September 1983) is a Peruvian footballer who plays as a full-back. He currently plays for Universidad Técnica de Cajamarca.

== Club career ==
Guevara made his debut in the Torneo Descentralizado in the 2003 season with Sport Boys. He stayed with the Callao-based club until the 2004 season.

In January 2005 he joined Unión Huaral as a free player. There he played under manager Roberto Arrelucea. He helped the club avoid relegation by finishing in 11th place in the Relegation table at the end of the 2005 Descentralizado season. In his second season with the Huaral club, Guevara scored his first Descentralizado league goal in Round 1 (Apertura) away to José Gálvez FBC. His goal was scored in the 6th minute and was the winning goal in 0–3 victory for his side. However, Unión Huaral finished in last place and were relegated at the end of the 2006 Descentralizado season.

Instead of going to play in the Second Division with Union Huaral, Guevara joined Total Clean as a free player in January 2007. He made his Descentralizado debut for his new side in Round 1 at home in the 1–2 loss against Universitario de Deportes. Guevara scored the winning goal in his club's first win of the season in Round 5 in the 3–0 home win over Coronel Bolognesi FC. He made a total of 19 league appearances with Total Clean but could not help the club avoid relegation at the end of the 2007 Descentralizado season.

In January 2008 Guevara signed as a free player for José Gálvez FBC.

== Honours ==
José Gálvez

- Torneo Intermedio: 2011
- Segunda División: 2011
