= Iago Ibagaza =

Spanish footballer

Personal information
- Full name: Iago Miquel Ibagaza Pawlak
- Date of birth: 5 May 2003 (age 23)
- Place of birth: Spain
- Height: 1.65 m (5 ft 5 in)
- Position: Winger

Youth career
- Olympiacos

Senior career*
Years	Team	Apps	(Gls)
2021–2024	Olympiacos B	31	(1)
2024–2025	Constància	1	(0)
- * Club domestic league appearances and goals as of 15 April 2024

Iago Miquel Ibagaza Pawlak (born 5 May 2003) is an Argentine professional footballer who plays as a winger.

== Personal life ==
He is the son of Ariel Ibagaza. He is of Argentine descent through his father, and of Polish descent through his mother.
