= Arturo Fernández (footballer) =

Peruvian footballer (1910–1999)

Personal information
- Full name: Arturo Fernández Meyzán
- Date of birth: 3 February 1910
- Place of birth: San Vicente de Cañete, Peru
- Date of death: 27 November 1999 (aged 89)
- Place of death: Lima, Peru
- Position: Defender

Senior career*
Years	Team	Apps	(Gls)
1926–1930	Ciclista Lima		
1930–1940	Universitario		
1940–1941	Colo-Colo		

International career
1930–1938	Peru	18	(0)

Managerial career
- 1941–1949: Universitario
- 1948–1950: Peru
- 1952–1953: Deportivo Municipal
- 1954–1955: Universitario
- 1956: Peru
- 1956–1957: Universitario
- 1965: Ciclista Lima
- * Club domestic league appearances and goals

Arturo Fernández Meyzán (3 February 1910 – 27 November 1999) was a Peruvian footballer who played as a defender. He represented the Peru national team at the 1930 FIFA World Cup. He also played for Universitario de Deportes, and for Peru at the 1936 Summer Olympics.

== Career ==
Fernández played for Ciclista Lima and Universitario in his homeland. As a member of Universitario, he won two league titles.

Abroad, he played for Chilean club Colo-Colo in 1940 and 1941, becoming the first Peruvian player in the club's history. He also represented them in friendly matches against the Argentine club Independiente in October 1940, alongside his compatriots César Socarraz, Pablo Pasache and his brother Teodoro.

== Personal life ==
He was the older brother of the professional footballers Teodoro, also a Peruvian international, and Eduardo Fernández. They also were the uncles of the footballers José, Jorge and Carlos Fernández.
