= Eduardo Fernández (Peruvian footballer) =

Peruvian footballer (1923–2002)

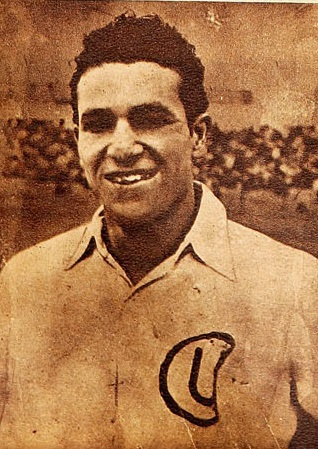
- Fernández in 1945

Personal information
- Full name: Eduardo Fernández Meyzán
- Date of birth: 30 April 1923
- Place of birth: San Vicente de Cañete, Peru
- Date of death: 27 November 2002 (aged 79)
- Place of death: Callao, Peru
- Position: Forward

Senior career*
Years	Team	Apps	(Gls)
1939–1946	Universitario		
1947–1950	Vélez Sarsfield	60	(6)
1951	Universitario		
1952–?	Sport Boys		
?–1957	Atlético Chalaco		
- * Club domestic league appearances and goals

Eduardo Fernández Meyzán (30 April 1923 – 27 November 2002) was a Peruvian footballer who played as a forward.

== Career ==
Nicknamed "Lolín"—a reference to the nickname of his brother, the renowned Universitario de Deportes icon Teodoro "Lolo" Fernández—Eduardo Fernández made his debut for the same club on 1 October 1939, in a match against Atlético Córdova, during which he scored his first two goals. He won three Peruvian league titles with Universitario (1941, 1945, and 1946) alongside his brother Teodoro, with both playing under the management of their eldest brother, Arturo Fernández. On 14 April 1946, he delivered a standout performance by scoring all six of his team's goals in a 6–2 victory over Alianza Lima. To this day, Eduardo Fernández holds the record for the most goals scored in a single Clásico match between Universitario and Alianza.

In 1947, he joined the Argentine club Vélez Sarsfield. He remained there until 1950 but was unable to replicate the success he had enjoyed with Universitario, scoring only six goals in 60 appearances. He returned to Peru in 1951 and, following a brief stint back at Universitario, signed with Sport Boys in 1952. He concluded his playing career in 1957 while with Atlético Chalaco.

After retiring from football, he worked for over 30 years at the customs office in Callao, the port of Lima. "Lolín" Fernández passed away on 27 November 2002, at the age of 79. Curiously, unlike his brothers Arturo and Teodoro, he never earned an international cap for Peru.

== Honours ==
Universitario de Deportes

- Peruvian Primera División: 1941, 1945, 1946
