= Javier González (footballer, born 1988) =

Venezuelan footballer

Personal information
- Full name: Javier Andrés González Tupper
- Date of birth: 26 February 1988 (age 38)
- Place of birth: Caracas, Venezuela
- Height: 1.85 m (6 ft 1 in)
- Position: Defender

Senior career*
Years	Team	Apps	(Gls)
2006–2009	St. Francis Brooklyn Terriers	68	(6)
2010–2013	Deportivo Petare	57	(2)
2013–2014	Atlético Venezuela	33	(1)
2014–2015	Ñublense	1	(0)
Total		159	(9)

International career
2006	Venezuela U20		
2009	Venezuela		
- * Club domestic league appearances and goals

Javier Andrés González Tupper (born 26 February 1988) is a Venezuelan former footballer who played as a defender.

== Career ==
González began his collegiate career playing for the NCAA Division I St. Francis Brooklyn Terriers. He played all four years, from 2006 to 2009, as a defender and appeared in 68 matches for St. Francis, tallying six goals, four assists and 16 career points. While a member of the Terriers, González was selected to play for Venezuela's U-20 National Team at the South American Youth Championships in 2006. Gonzalez was also selected to travel with the Venezuela national team as they took on Mexico in an "international friendly" in Atlanta, Georgia on 25 June 2009. At the conclusion of the 2009 regular season with the Terriers, he was selected to the Northeast Conference All-Second Team as well as the NSCAA/Adidas All-North Atlantic Region Second Team. With Gonzalez anchoring the defense, the team qualified for the NEC Tournament, their first playoff appearance in nine years.

González then debuted professionally with Deportivo Petare and played three years with the club from 2010 to 2013. With Petare he logged 4,833 minutes while appearing in 57 matches. He scored his first professional goal on 6 November 2011, in the 76th minute against Yaracuyanos to lead Deportivo Petare to a 1–0 victory. The next season, he notched his second career goal in the 8th minute of a 3–1 victory against Real Esppor back on 19 August.

In 2013, González started in all thirty-three matches for Atlético Venezuela, logging a grand-total of 2,941 minutes while scoring the game-tying goal against Trujillanos back on 1 December 2013 at the Estadio Nacional Brigido Iriarte in Caracas.

In 2014, González reached a deal with Ñublense.

In 2016, González retired from football and was selected to participate in the 17th edition of the FIFA Master. After graduating, he worked in Switzerland for Sportradar, and later moved to Asunción to work for FIFA's Development Office.

== Personal life ==
González was born of a Venezuelan father, Luis Miguel González, and a mother of Chilean descent, María Tupper, who is the cousin of popular former Chilean footballer Raimundo Tupper. Since his maternal grandfather is Chilean, he holds the Chilean nationality by descent.
