= Rafa Ancheta =

Uruguayan footballer (born 1997)

Personal information
- Full name: Rafaela Medina Ancheta
- Date of birth: 2 January 1997 (age 29)
- Place of birth: Porto Alegre, Brazil
- Height: 1.84 m (6 ft 0 in)
- Positions: Centre-back; defensive midfielder

Senior career*
Years	Team	Apps	(Gls)
2016	Estância Velha		
2017–2019	Grêmio		
2020	Granadilla	0	(0)
2021	Real Brasília	0	(0)

International career^{‡}
2019	Uruguay	3	(0)
- * Club domestic league appearances and goals as of 19 January 2020 ‡ National team caps and goals as of 25 May 2025

Rafaela "Rafa" Medina Ancheta (born 2 January 1997) is a former footballer. Mainly a centre-back, she also operated as a defensive midfielder. Born in Brazil, she played for the Uruguay national team.

== Early life ==
Rafa Ancheta was born in Porto Alegre to Alfonso Medina and Gabriela Ancheta. She has a brother, Rodrigo, who is also a footballer.

== International career ==
Rafa Ancheta made her formal debut for Uruguay on 4 March 2019 in a 0–6 friendly loss against France.

== Personal life ==
Rafa Ancheta is the granddaughter of former Uruguayan international footballer Atilio Ancheta.
