= Manuel Pedreros =

Chilean footballer

Personal information
- Full name: Manuel Jesús Pedreros Guevara
- Date of birth: 17 July 1954 (age 72)
- Place of birth: Concepción, Chile
- Position: Midfielder

Youth career
- Industrial FC

Senior career*
Years	Team	Apps	(Gls)
1973–1974	Naval	8	(1)
1975–1981	Iberia-Bío Bío		
1982–1986	Cobresal	67	(5)
1986	Deportivo Cali		
1987–1988	Cobresal	30	(1)
1988	Naval	28	(6)
1989	Iberia-Bío Bío		
1992	Mulchén Unido	–	(–)

International career
1987	Chile	1	(0)
- * Club domestic league appearances and goals

Manuel Jesús Pedreros Guevara (born 17 July 1954) is a Chilean former professional footballer who played as a midfielder for clubs in Chile and Colombia.

== Club career ==
As a child, Pedreros was with Industrial FC from Concepción, Chile. At professional level, he played for Naval de Talcahuano, Iberia-Bío Bío, Cobresal and Mulchén Unido.

A historical player of Cobresal between 1982 and 1988, he took part in the 1986 Copa Libertadores and won both the 1983 Segunda División and the 1987 Copa Lan Chile.

Abroad, he played for Colombian side Deportivo Cali in 1986.

== International career ==
Pedreros made one appearance for the Chile national team in a match against Brazil on 9 December 1987.

== Personal life ==
He is the older brother of the also former Chile international footballer, Leonel Pedreros. His son of the same name, played for Deportes Concepción and Fernández Vial, coinciding with his brother, Leonel, in 1995.
