= Ludemar =

Brazilian footballer (born 1979)

Personal information
- Full name: Ludemar Pereira Barros
- Date of birth: 1 June 1979 (age 47)
- Place of birth: Aragarças, Brazil
- Height: 1.77 m (5 ft 10 in)
- Position: Forward

Senior career*
Years	Team	Apps	(Gls)
1998–1999	Barra		
1999–2000	Rio Branco-SP		
2001	Rio Branco-AC		
2001	Caldas		
2001–2002	Náutico		
2002–2003	Belenenses	27	(6)
2003	União de Leiria	10	(1)
2004	Guarani		
2004	Rio Branco-SP		
2005	Ituano		
2005	Estoril	11	(2)
2006	Coritiba		
2006–2007	Al Dhafra		
2008	Juventus-SP		
2008	Gama		
2008–2009	Barra		
2009	Santa Helena		
2010	Vila Nova		
2010	Anápolis		
2011	Morrinhos		
2011	Primavera		
2011	Santa Cruz	6	(1)
2011	Barra		
2012	Iporá		
2012–2013	Ypiranga	11	(2)
2013	Penarol		
2013	Barra		
2014	Rondonópolis		
2014	AA Araguaia		
- * Club domestic league appearances and goals

Ludemar Pereira Barros, known as Ludemar (born 1 June 1979) is a Brazilian former professional footballer who played as a forward.

== Career ==
Ludemar made his Primeira Liga debut for Belenenses on 25 August 2002 in a game against Porto.
