= Eduardo de Saa =

Chilean footballer

Personal information
- Place of birth: Lugo, Spain
- Position: Defender

Senior career*
Years	Team	Apps	(Gls)
–1930	La Paternal		
1931–?	Vélez Sarsfield	14	(1)
1937–1938	Unión Española		
1939–1941	Universidad de Chile	29	(1)
1942	Always Ready		

International career
1941	Chile		

Managerial career
- 1942: Always Ready
- * Club domestic league appearances and goals

Eduardo de Saa was a footballer who played as a defender for clubs in Argentina, Chile and Bolivia. Born in Spain, he played for the Chile national team.

== Career ==
Born in Lugo, Spain, De Saa developed his career in South America. He joined Vélez Sarsfield, alongside his brother Manuel Herminio, from Club Atlético La Paternal as a forward, but he later turned into a defender. For the club, he made fourteen appearances and scored one goal.

In the late 1930s, De Saa emigrated to Chile and played for Unión Española. In 1939, he joined Universidad de Chile, becoming the first Argentine player in the club history. With them, he won the 1940 league title, the first one for the club.

In April 1942, he moved to Bolivia and performed as both player and manager of Always Ready, coinciding with the Chilean goalkeeper Horacio Amaral.

At international level, De Saa represented the Chile in 1941 becoming the third Argentine to make it after Colin Campbell (1910) and Salvador Nocetti (1940).

== Personal life ==
His brother, Manuel Herminio, was a well-known defender of Vélez Sarsfield between 1926 and 1941 and represented the Argentina national team in 1935.

Born in Lugo, Spain, to a Spanish father and an Argentine mother, he naturalized Argentine.

Due to his origin, he and his brother were nicknamed Gallego.
