= Armando Melgar =

Guatemalan footballer

Armando Melgar Retolaza
Personal information
- Date of birth: 25 November 1945 (age 80)
- Place of birth: Guatemala City, Guatemala

International career
Years	Team	Apps	(Gls)
- Guatemala
Medal record
Men's football
Representing Guatemala
CONCACAF Championship
Runner-up	1969 Costa Rica

Armando Melgar Retolaza (born 25 November 1945) is a Guatemalan footballer. He competed in the men's tournament at the 1968 Summer Olympics.

== Honours ==
Guatemala

- CONCACAF Championship: Runner-up, 1969
