= Pablo Pasache =

Peruvian-Chilean footballer (1915–1990)

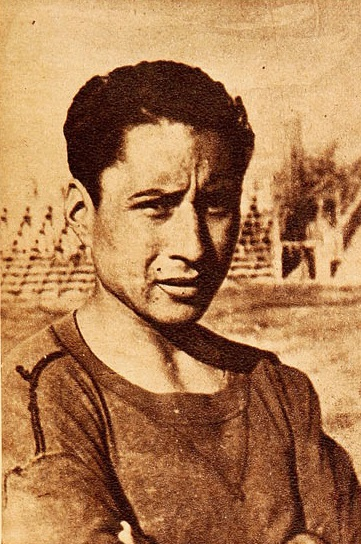
- Pasache in 1945

Personal information
- Date of birth: 1 February 1915
- Place of birth: Ica, Peru
- Date of death: 1990 (aged 74–75)
- Place of death: Fremont, California, United States
- Position: Midfielder

Senior career*
| Years | Team | Apps | (Gls) |
| 1938–1940 | Deportivo Municipal | | |
| 1940–1944 | Magallanes | | |
| 1945–1950 | Universitario | | |
| 1951–1952 | Deportivo Municipal | | |

International career
| 1938–1942 | Peru | 10 | (0) |
| 1941 | Chile | 1 | (0) |

Managerial career
- 1960: Universitario (assistant)
- 1960: Peru (assistant)
- * Club domestic league appearances and goals

Pablo Pasache (born 1 February 1915 – 1990) was a Peruvian-Chilean footballer who played as a midfielder.

== Career ==
Pasache played for Deportivo Municipal and Universitario in his country of birth. As a member of Universitario, he became two-time league champion in 1946.

Abroad, he played for Chilean club Magallanes from 1940 to 1944. He also represented Colo-Colo in friendly matches against the Argentine club Independiente in October 1940, alongside his compatriots César Socarraz and the brothers Arturo and Teodoro Fernández.

At international level, he made ten appearances in total for the Peru national team between 1938 and 1942, taking part in the South American Championships of 1939 and 1942, winning the first.

On 8 January 1941, he represented the Chile national team in a 5–2 loss against Argentina, the second match of the Copa Presidente de Argentina.
