= Arturo Galarza =

Paraguayan-Bolivian footballer (1944–2008)

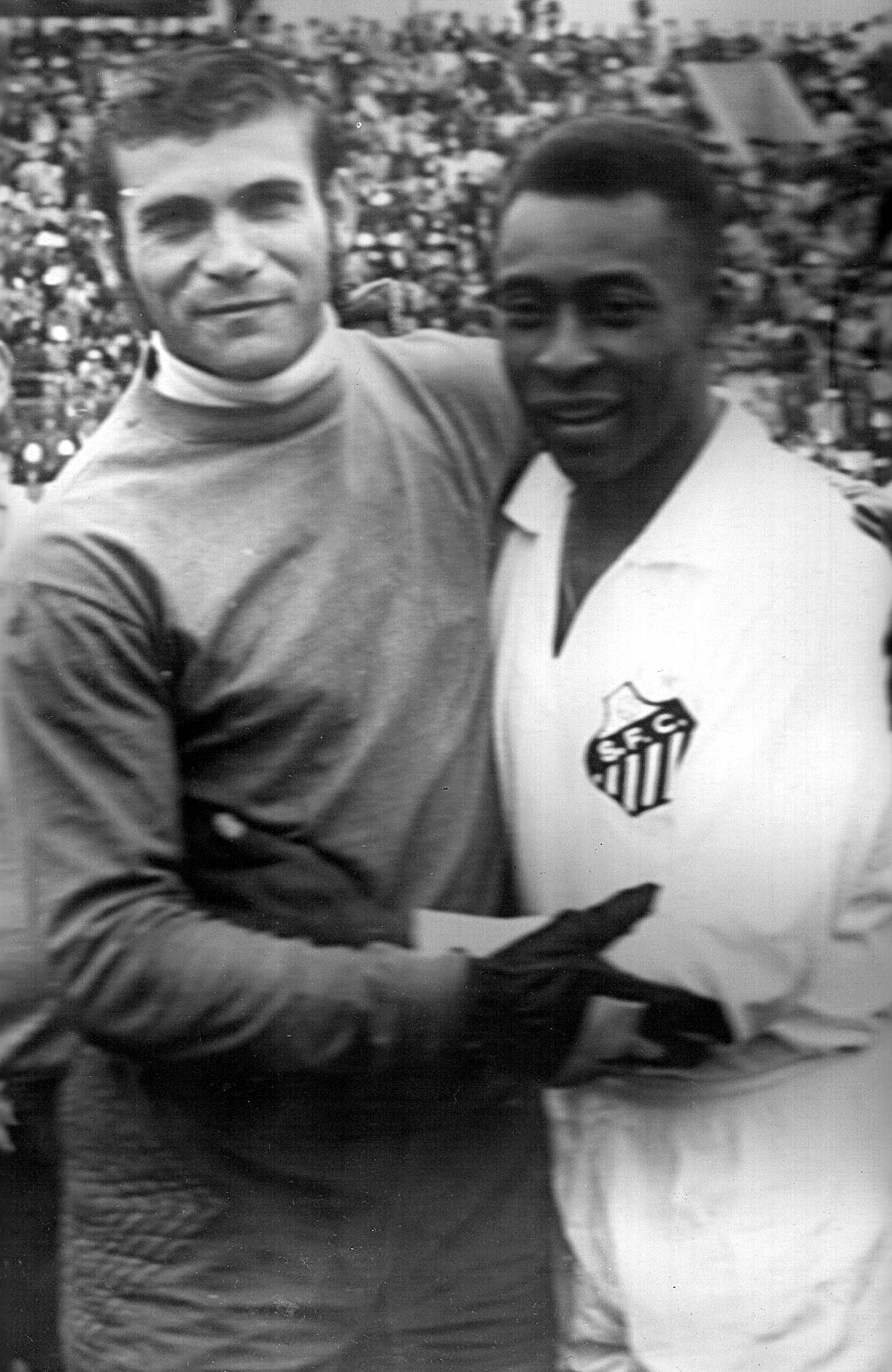
- Arturo Galarza (left) with Pelé (c. 1971)

Personal information
- Full name: Arturo Eduardo Galarza Mayeregger
- Date of birth: 7 September 1944
- Place of birth: Asunción, Paraguay
- Date of death: 18 June 2008 (aged 63)
- Place of death: Asunción, Paraguay
- Position: Goalkeeper

Senior career*
Years	Team	Apps	(Gls)
1965–1969	Nacional		
1969–1979	Bolívar		
1980	Guaraní		
1981	Deportivo Pereira		

International career
1964–1965	Paraguay	9	(0)
1977	Bolivia	2	(0)
- * Club domestic league appearances and goals

Arturo Eduardo Galarza Mayeregger (7 September 1944 – 18 June 2008) was a professional footballer who played as a goalkeeper. Galarza played for notable clubs in Paraguay, Bolivia and Colombia. During his playing career Galarza earned caps for both the national teams of Paraguay and Bolivia.
