= 1979 Copa Polla Gol final =

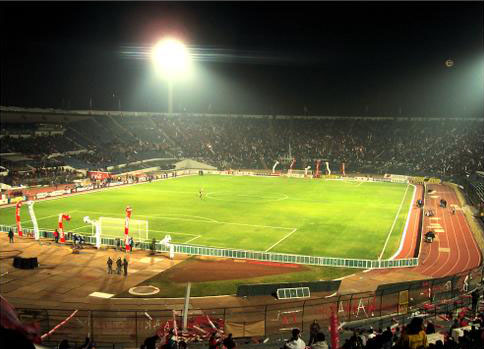
- Event: 1979 Copa Polla Gol
Universidad de Chile	Colo-Colo
2	1
- Date: 14 April 1979
- Venue: Estadio Nacional, Santiago, Chile
- Referee: Alberto Martínez
- Attendance: 74,111

The 1979 Copa Polla Gol final was played between Universidad de Chile and Colo-Colo at the Estadio Nacional in Santiago, Chile on 14 April 1979, to determine that year's competition winner. Universidad de Chile won the match 2–1, lifting the cup for the first time in its history.

== Match details ==
April 14, 1979

Universidad de Chile	2 – 1	Colo-Colo
Ramos 18'; Hoffens 51'		A. Herrera 3'

Estadio Nacional, Santiago
Attendance: 74,111
Referee: Alberto Martínez

Universidad de Chile	Colo-Colo

UNIVERSIDAD DE CHILE:
GK	(Argentina) Hugo Carballo
DF	(Paraguay) Johnny Ashwell
DF	(Chile) Alberto Quintano
DF	(Chile) Luis Mosquera
DF	(Chile) Vladimir Bigorra
MF	(Chile) Juan Soto
MF	(Chile) Leonardo Montenegro
MF	(Chile) Jorge Socías
FW	(Chile) Héctor Hoffens
FW	(Argentina) Luis Alberto Ramos
FW	(Chile) Mariano Puyol
Manager:
(Chile) Fernando Riera

COLO-COLO:
GK	(Chile) Óscar Wirth
DF	(Chile) Mario Galindo
DF	(Chile) Leonel Herrera
DF	(Chile) Atilio Herrera
DF	(Chile) Gabriel Rodríguez
MF	(Chile) Carlos Rivas
MF	(Chile) Daniel Díaz
MF	(Chile) José Bernal
FW	(Argentina) Ramón Héctor Ponce
FW	(Chile) Carlos Caszely
FW	(Chile) Leonardo Véliz
Manager:
(Chile) Pedro Morales Torres
