= Sandrino Castec =

Chilean footballer (1960–2024)

Personal information
- Full name: Sandrino del Carmen Castec Martínez
- Date of birth: 18 June 1960
- Place of birth: Santiago, Chile
- Date of death: 11 December 2024 (aged 64)
- Place of death: Puente Alto, Chile
- Height: 1.79 m (5 ft 10 in)
- Position: Forward

Youth career
- 1975–1977: Universidad de Chile

Senior career*
Years	Team	Apps	(Gls)
1977–1984	Universidad de Chile	120	(42)
1984–1985	Audax Italiano	39	(9)
1986–1987	Universidad de Chile	31	(12)
1987–1988	Cruz Azul		
1988	Cobresal	2	(0)
1989	Universidad de Chile	6	(0)
1989	Deportes Valdivia	17	(1)

International career
1980–1983	Chile	7	(1)
- * Club domestic league appearances and goals

Sandrino del Carmen Castec Martínez (18 June 1960 – 11 December 2024) was a Chilean footballer who played as a forward for clubs in Chile and Mexico.

== Club career ==
As a player of Universidad de Chile, Castec came to the youth system at the age of fourteen and made his professional debut in 1977 thanks to the coach Luis Ibarra, staying with the club until 1984. He had another two stints with the club in 1986–87 and 1989. In total, he made 201 appearances and scored 61 goals for the club and won the 1979 Copa Polla Gol.

In Chile, he also played for Audax Italiano, where he made up a successful pair with Héctor Hoffens, Cobresal and Deportes Valdivia, his last club.

In Mexico, he played for Cruz Azul in the Mexican Primera División alongside his compatriot Mariano Puyol.

== International career ==
Castec made seven appearances for the Chile national team between 1980 and 1983. He scored a well remembered goal by chilena kick in a 2–2 draw against Argentina on 18 September 1980, the independence day of Chile.

== Personal life and death ==
Castec was nicknamed El Bombardero Azul (The Blue Bomber) due to his high-scoring ability in Universidad de Chile.

Castec was a candidate to councillor for Puente Alto commune in 2012 and 2016.

In April 2024, Castec suffered a septic shock that left him in a serious condition. He died from complications in Puente Alto, on 11 December 2024, at the age of 64.

== Honours ==
Universidad de Chile

- Copa Polla Gol: 1979
