= Manuel Ibarra =

Chilean footballer (born 1977)

Personal information
- Full name: Manuel Francisco Ibarra Valdés
- Date of birth: 18 November 1977 (age 48)
- Place of birth: Graneros, Chile
- Height: 1.78 m (5 ft 10 in)
- Position: Right-back

Youth career
- Coquimbo Unido

Senior career*
Years	Team	Apps	(Gls)
1994–1995	Santiago Morning	–	(–)
1995–1997	Coquimbo Unido	6	(0)
1998–2001	Santiago Morning	45	(0)
2002–2003	Magallanes	50	(0)
2004–2005	Universidad de Chile	63	(0)
2006	Cobresal	23	(1)
2007	Unión Española	24	(0)
2008	Audax Italiano	3	(0)
Total		214	(1)

International career
2000	Chile Olympic	1	(0)
- * Club domestic league appearances and goals

Manuel Francisco Ibarra Valdés (born 18 November 1977) is a former Chilean footballer who played as right-back.

== Career ==
Ibarra came to Coquimbo at the age of 8 and was trained at Coquimbo Unido.

At the age of 17, Ibarra moved to Santiago and joined Santiago Morning in the Chilean Tercera División.

After, he played on Chilean clubs Coquimbo Unido, Santiago Morning, Cobresal, Everton, Magallanes, Unión Española, and Universidad de Chile. He played in 2000 Summer Olympics in Sydney. The team won the bronze medal.

== Personal life ==
Ibarra is the cousin of the Chile international footballer Gabriel Mendoza. In addition, his father made appearances with Universidad Católica at the age of 16 and switched to amateur football.

He is known by his nickname Caté, after the Brazilian former footballer for Universidad Católica, Catê.

== Post-retirement ==
At the same time Ibarra was a footballer, he trained boxing. Following his retirement, he became a boxer at amateur level.

In addition to boxing, Ibarra has also spending time as a cumbia singer-songwriter and sports coach for football academies and schools. In January 2026, he launched his first official song called "Se te olvidó" (You forgot) alongside the singer Kevin Tarrés.

Ibarra has taken part in friendly matches of historical players of Universidad de Chile alongside former players such as Sergio Vargas, Cristián Castañeda, Víctor Bascuñán, Mariano Puyol, among others.

== Honours ==
Universidad de Chile

- Primera División de Chile (1): 2004 Apertura

Chile Olympic

- Olympic Games: (bronze) in 2000 Sydney
