= 1979 Campeonato Nacional Primera División =

Campeonato Nacional 1979
- Dates: 21 April 1979 – 23 December 1979
- Champions: Colo-Colo (12th title)
- Relegated: Ñublense; Santiago Morning
- 1980 Copa Libertadores: Colo-Colo; O'Higgins
- Matches: 306
- Goals: 837 (2.74 per match)
- Top goalscorer: Carlos Caszely (20 goals)
- Biggest away win: Santiago Morning 0–6 Colo-Colo (1 May)
- Highest attendance: 75,455 Universidad Católica 0–0 Colo-Colo (27 May)
- Total attendance: 2,308,605
- Average attendance: 7,594

The 1979 Campeonato Nacional was Chilean football top tier's 47th season. Colo-Colo was the tournament's champion, winning its twelfth title.

== Standings ==
Pos	Team	Pld	W	D	L	GF	GA	GD	Pts	Qualification or relegation
1	Colo-Colo	34	23	8	3	72	24	+48	55 (Note: 1 bonus point awarded.)	Champions & qualified to 1980 Copa Libertadores
2	Cobreloa	34	18	8	8	61	36	+25	45	Qualified to Liguilla Pre-Copa Libertadores
3	Unión Española	34	18	7	9	45	31	+14	44	Qualified to Liguilla Pre-Copa Libertadores
4	Universidad de Chile	34	17	8	9	37	25	+12	44 (Note: 2 bonus points awarded.)	Qualified to Liguilla Pre-Copa Libertadores
5	O'Higgins	34	18	7	9	47	40	+7	43	Qualified to Liguilla Pre-Copa Libertadores
6	Green Cross Temuco	34	14	11	9	46	40	+6	39	
7	Coquimbo Unido	34	14	8	12	60	57	+3	36	
8	Palestino	34	10	14	10	52	50	+2	34	
9	Deportes Concepción	34	12	10	12	49	49	0	34	
10	Universidad Católica	34	9	15	10	45	38	+7	33	
11	Aviación	34	12	8	14	52	41	+11	32	
12	Lota Schwager	34	9	13	12	28	44	−16	31	
13	Naval	34	8	14	12	45	55	−10	30	
14	Everton	34	10	9	15	54	57	−3	29	
15	Audax Italiano	34	10	7	17	46	56	−10	27	Qualified to Promotion/relegation Liguilla
16	Santiago Wanderers	34	6	9	19	37	65	−28	21	Qualified to Promotion/relegation Liguilla
17	Santiago Morning	34	7	7	20	33	72	−39	21	Relegated to Segunda División
18	Ñublense	34	6	7	21	28	57	−29	19	Relegated to Segunda División

Notes:

Campeonato Nacional
1979 champions
Colo-Colo
12th title

== Results ==
Home \ Away	AUD	AVI	CLO	COL	DCO	COQ	EVE	GCT	LOT	NAV	ÑUB	OHI	PAL	SMO	UCA	UCH	UES	SWA
Audax		2–4	1–4	0–1	2–1	5–0	2–5	1–1	0–1	3–1	3–0	2–0	0–0	0–2	1–3	1–2	2–0	3–2
Aviación	1–2		0–3	1–3	1–1	1–1	0–0	1–0	2–0	5–1	0–0	0–1	1–2	2–0	4–0	1–2	2–2	4–0
Cobreloa	5–2	1–0		0–2	4–1	4–1	4–2	2–1	3–0	3–1	2–1	2–1	1–1	1–1	1–1	2–1	0–1	4–0
Colo-Colo	2–1	2–1	0–0		2–1	0–0	2–0	0–1	2–1	3–0	5–0	3–2	1–0	4–2	3–3	2–0	2–1	7–2
Concepción	2–0	1–2	2–2	2–1		2–0	1–4	0–0	1–1	1–2	1–0	0–2	1–1	5–1	0–0	2–2	1–2	2–0
Coquimbo	5–1	2–6	1–0	0–2	4–0		3–2	4–0	2–0	4–4	4–1	2–1	2–2	1–2	1–0	1–0	2–3	5–0
Everton	0–0	0–3	0–1	3–2	2–3	2–1		2–2	1–1	2–2	2–1	1–2	3–1	4–2	2–2	0–0	1–3	3–2
Green Cross T.	0–0	2–1	1–2	0–0	3–3	4–0	2–1		2–1	1–3	1–0	2–0	1–0	3–0	2–1	2–0	2–0	3–1
Lota S.	1–5	2–1	2–1	0–0	0–0	1–1	1–1	1–1		1–1	1–0	3–0	0–0	1–0	0–3	0–2	0–1	1–0
Naval	0–0	4–1	1–1	0–1	1–3	2–4	2–2	3–3	0–0		2–4	0–0	1–1	1–0	0–0	0–0	1–0	1–1
Ñublense	2–0	0–2	0–0	1–3	0–2	1–3	3–0	1–0	1–1	1–4		0–0	5–2	0–0	1–1	0–1	0–0	2–0
O'Higgins	3–0	1–0	3–2	1–5	1–1	0–0	2–1	2–0	4–0	3–2	3–1		3–2	2–1	0–0	2–1	1–0	1–0
Palestino	2–2	1–2	2–0	0–0	4–2	2–2	1–0	1–1	1–1	1–2	3–1	2–0		3–3	5–2	2–0	2–0	1–1
S. Morning	0–3	1–1	1–0	0–6	1–2	0–1	1–6	1–1	0–2	2–1	1–0	4–1	3–1		1–2	0–1	1–1	1–4
U. Católica	2–0	1–1	2–2	0–0	1–2	4–1	1–0	5–0	2–2	1–2	1–0	0–1	1–2	4–0		0–0	0–1	1–1
U. de Chile	1–0	2–1	2–1	0–1	2–1	1–0	2–0	0–0	1–2	2–0	2–0	1–1	1–1	3–0	0–0		1–0	2–1
U. Española	2–1	1–0	1–2	0–4	1–0	2–0	2–1	2–0	4–0	0–0	2–1	0–0	3–1	4–0	1–1	1–0		2–0
S. Wanderers	1–1	0–0	0–1	1–1	0–2	2–2	0–1	1–4	1–0	1–0	5–0	2–3	4–2	1–1	1–0	0–2	2–2	

Legend: Blue = home team win; Yellow = draw; Red = away team win.

== Topscorers ==
Name	Team	Goals
(Chile) Carlos Caszely	Colo-Colo	20
(Brazil) Liminha	Coquimbo Unido	19
(Argentina) Ricardo Fabbiani	Aviación	18
(Argentina) Luis Alberto Ramos	Universidad de Chile	18

== Liguilla Pre-Copa Libertadores ==
26 December 1979	Unión Española	1 – 0	Cobreloa	Estadio Nacional, Santiago
	Pinto 48'			Attendance: 19,621; Referee: J. Silvagno

26 December 1979	Universidad de Chile	1 – 1	O'Higgins	Estadio Nacional, Santiago
	Own-goal 40'		88' Vargas	Attendance: 19,621; Referee: R. Hormazábal

28 December 1979	Unión Española	2 – 4	O'Higgins	Estadio Nacional, Santiago
	Rojas 7'; Pinto 88'		23' Ahumada; 63' Neira; 64', 85' Vargas	Attendance: 16,364; Referee: G. Castro

28 December 1979	Universidad de Chile	1 – 0	Cobreloa	Estadio Nacional, Santiago
	Socías 68'			Attendance: 16,364; Referee: S. Vásquez

30 December 1979	O'Higgins	2 – 1	Cobreloa	Estadio Nacional, Santiago
	Lima 65' (pen.); Vargas 71'		6' Alarcón	Attendance: 14,932; Referee: A. Martínez

30 December 1979	Universidad de Chile	3 – 2	Unión Española	Estadio Nacional, Santiago
	Salah 33'; Socías 61'; Ramos 70'		6', 35' Hurtado	Attendance: 14,932; Referee: M. Lira

Pos	Team	Pld	W	D	L	GF	GA	GD	Pts	Qualification
1	O'Higgins	3	2	1	0	6	3	+3	5	Qualified to Liguilla Play-off match
2	Universidad de Chile	3	2	1	0	5	3	+2	5	Qualified to Liguilla Play-off match
3	Unión Española	3	1	0	2	5	7	−2	2	
4	Cobreloa	3	0	0	3	0	3	−3	0	

=== Liguilla Play-off match ===
4 January 1980	Universidad de Chile	0 – 1	O'Higgins	Estadio Nacional, Santiago
			78' Quiroz	Attendance: 47,072; Referee: M. Lira

O'Higgins qualified to 1980 Copa Libertadores

== Promotion/relegation Liguilla ==
Pos	Team	Pld	W	D	L	GF	GA	GD	Pts
1	Santiago Wanderers	3	1	2	0	4	3	+1	4
2	Audax Italiano	3	1	2	0	1	0	+1	4
3	Deportes Arica	3	1	1	1	3	2	+1	3
4	Independiente	3	0	1	2	4	7	−3	1

Source: rsssf.com

* There was no promotion or relegation.

== See also ==
- 1979 Copa Polla Gol
