= Eduardo Fournier =

Chilean footballer (born 1956)

Personal information
- Full name: Eduardo Antonio Furniel Arriagada
- Date of birth: 2 January 1956 (age 70)
- Place of birth: Talca, Chile
- Position: Goalkeeper

Senior career*
| Years | Team | Apps | (Gls) |
| 1975–1980 | Aviación | 91 | (0) |
| 1977 | → Deportes Concepción (loan) | 0 | (0) |
| 1981–1987 | Cobreloa | 80 | (0) |
| 1988 | Fernández Vial | 25 | (0) |
| 1989–1991 | Universidad de Chile | 67 | (0) |
| 1992 | Provincial Osorno | | |
| 1993–1994 | Audax Italiano | | |

International career
| 1984 | Chile Olympic | 4 | (0) |
| 1987 | Chile B | 1 | (0) |

Managerial career
- 1999: Rangers (interim)
- 2003: Cobreloa (interim)
- 2005: Cobreloa (interim)
Medal record
Men's football
Representing Chile
Pan American Games
| Silver medal – second place | 1987 Indianapolis | Team |
- * Club domestic league appearances and goals

Eduardo Antonio Furniel Arriagada (born 2 January 1956), commonly known as Eduardo Fournier, is a Chilean former football player and coach.

== Playing career ==
Born in Talca, Fournier played as a goalkeeper for clubs including Audax Italiano and Cobreloa.

As a member of Universidad de Chile, Fournier was one of the mainstays players in the 1989 season, when the club returned to the Primera División, alongside teammates such as Héctor Hoffens, Marco Fajre, Horacio Rivas, among others.

Fournier represented Chile at the 1984 Summer Olympics. Fournier also made one appearance for Chile in the 1987 Pan-American games.

== Coaching career ==
After retiring as a player, Fournier became a football coach and managed a number of Chilean club sides including Rangers and their youth teams and Cobreloa. From 2008 to 2017, he worked as goalkeeping coach of Santiago Wanderers.

== Personal life ==
His son, Gianni Furniel, also known as Gianni Fournier, is a former professional footballer who played as a defender for Rangers de Talca and Fernández Vial.

He is known by his nickname Loco (Crazy).
