= José Balbuena =

Peruvian-Chilean footballer (1918–2009)

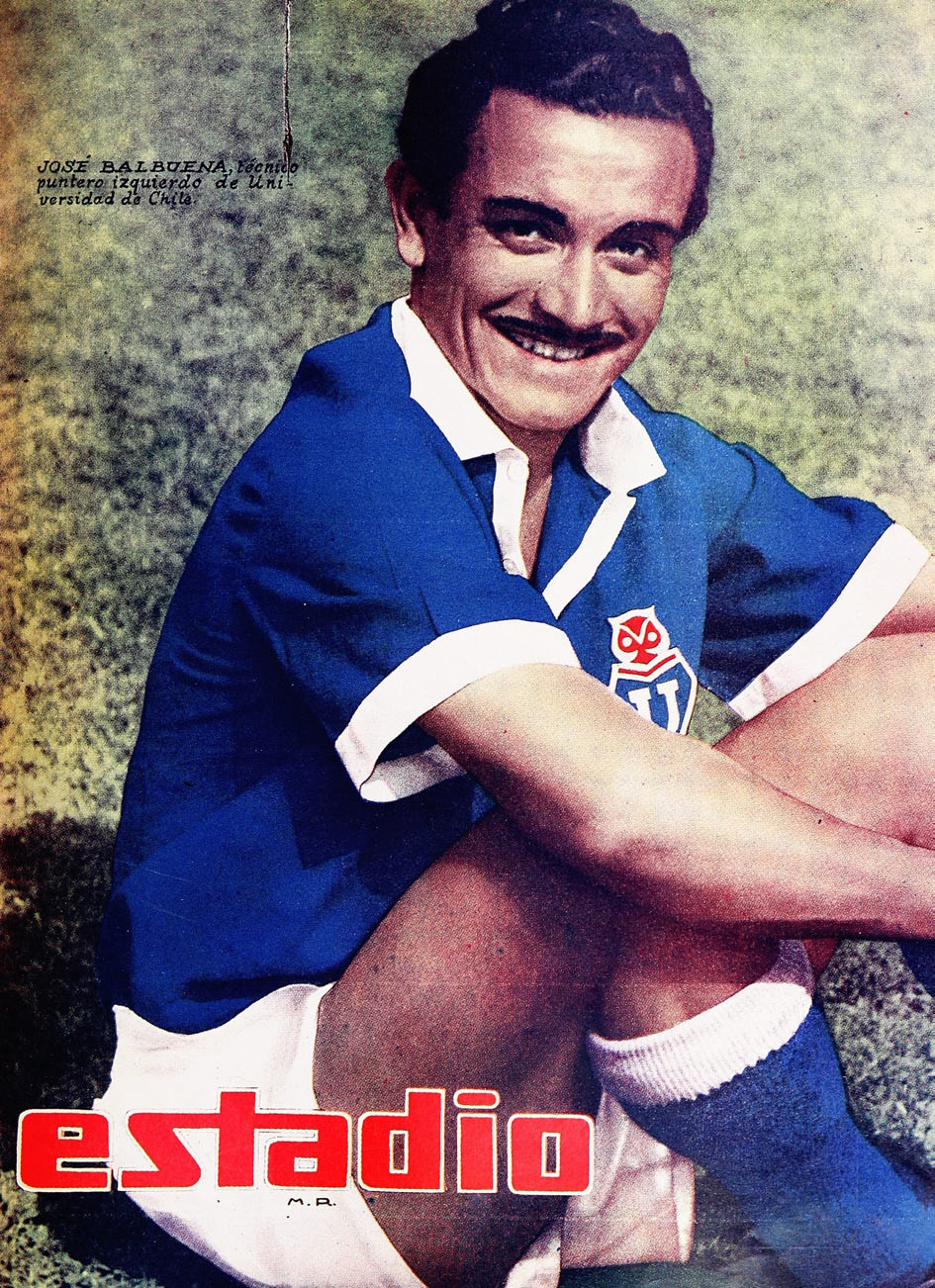
- José Balbuena in 1947

Personal information
- Full name: José Balbuena Rodríguez
- Date of birth: 13 February 1918
- Place of birth: Lima, Peru
- Date of death: 22 June 2009 (aged 91)
- Place of death: Santiago, Chile
- Position: Forward

Senior career*
| Years | Team | Apps | (Gls) |
| 1936–1937 | Universitario | | |
| 1937–1938 | Deportivo Municipal | | |
| 1939–1950 | Universidad de Chile | 190 | (51) |
| 1943 | → Boca Juniors (loan) | 2 | (0) |
| 1951 | Ferrobádminton | | |

International career
| 1941–1947 | Chile | 2 | (1) |
- * Club domestic league appearances and goals

José Balbuena Rodríguez (February 13, 1918 – June 22, 2009) was a Peruvian-Chilean footballer who played for clubs in Peru and Chile.

== Club career ==
After became the champion of the 1938 Peruvian Primera División along with Deportivo Municipal, in 1939 he moved to Universidad de Chile, winning the 1940 Primera División de Chile and becoming the sixth foreign top goalscorer for the club. In addition, he played two matches for Boca Juniors loaned by the Chilean team.

== International career ==
He naturalized Chilean in 1947 and was called up to the Chile national team for the 1947 South American Championship, making an appearance in the match against Ecuador. Prior to this, he represented Chile against Argentina in the second match of the 1941 Copa Presidente de Argentina, scoring a goal at the minute 47.

== Personal life ==
He was nicknamed Cholo, an affectionate form how Chileans refers to the native people from Peru.

== Honours ==
Deportivo Municipal

- Peruvian Primera División (1): 1938

Universidad de Chile

- Chilean Primera División (1): 1940
