= Carlos Soto =

Carlos Soto may refer to:

- Carlos Soto (footballer, born 1959), Chilean defender
- Carlos Soto (footballer, born 1965), Chilean midfielder
- Carlos Soto (judoka), Honduran judoka
- Carlos Soto Menegazzo, Guatemalan politician
- Carlos Soto Rengifo (1891–1981), Chilean politician

== See also ==
- Cerro Maravilla murders
