= Víctor Bascuñán =

Chilean footballer

Personal information
- Full name: Víctor Eduardo Bascuñán Catrileo
- Date of birth: 16 June 1973 (age 53)
- Place of birth: Santiago, Chile
- Position: Defender

Youth career
- Universidad de Chile

Senior career*
Years	Team	Apps	(Gls)
1991–1995	Universidad de Chile	8	(0)
1993	→ Cerro Corá (loan)		
1994	→ Santiago Wanderers (loan)		
1996	Unión Española	7	(0)
1997	Santiago Morning	20	(0)

International career
1990	Chile U17		
1994	Chile U23 B		
- * Club domestic league appearances and goals

Víctor Eduardo Bascuñán Catrileo (born 16 June 1973) is a Chilean former professional footballer who played as a defender for clubs in Chile and Paraguay.

== Career ==
A product of Universidad de Chile, Bascuñán made his debut in 1991 and was a member of the two-champion squad of the Chilean Primera División in 1994 and 1995, taking part in the 1995 Copa Libertadores in the 3–2 win against the Colombian club Millonarios. A member of them until 1995, he also had stints loaned out to Cerro Corá in the Paraguayan top division and Santiago Wanderers in the Chilean Segunda División.

After Universidad de Chile, he played for Unión Española in the top division and Santiago Morning in the Primera B, his last club.

At international level, he was a member of both Chile U17 in 1990 and an under-23 squad made up by players from the Segunda División.

== Post-retirement ==
Bascuñán graduated as a lawyer at Universidad SEK.

Strongly bound to Club Universidad de Chile, he has been a member of both Consejo Azul (Blue Council), an entity made up by people bound to the club from different spheres, and Más Allá del Horizonte (Beyond The Horizon), the association of former players.

He has also taken part in friendly matches of historical players of Universidad de Chile alongside former players such as Sergio Vargas, Cristián Castañeda, Mauricio Aros, Mariano Puyol, among others.
