= Víctor Castañeda =

Chilean footballer (born 1938)

Personal information
- Full name: Víctor Manuel Castañeda Flores
- Date of birth: 21 December 1938 (age 87)
- Place of birth: San Vicente de Tagua Tagua, Chile

Senior career*
Years	Team	Apps	(Gls)
1965–1974	Palestino		

International career
1967	Chile	1	(0)
- * Club domestic league appearances and goals

Víctor Manuel Castañeda Flores (born 21 December 1938) is a Chilean former footballer. He played in one match for the Chile national football team in 1967. He was also part of Chile's squad for the 1967 South American Championship.

== Personal life ==
He belongs to a football family since his younger brothers, Hugo, Rolando and Gerardo, were professional footballers. He is also the uncle of the brothers Víctor Hugo and Cristián, both sons of Hugo, who coincided in Palestino, Universidad de Chile and the Chile national team. In addition, his nephews Marco and Roly were with the Palestino youth ranks, as well as his brother Manuel, who was with the reserve team.
