= 1979 Copa Polla Gol =

Chilean cup football tournament

Tournament details
- Country: Chile

Final positions
- Champions: Club Universidad de Chile
- Runners-up: Colo-Colo

Tournament statistics
- Top goal scorer: Luis Ramos (Universidad de Chile) 12 goals

The 1979 Copa Polla Gol was the ninth edition of the Chilean Cup tournament. The competition started on February 17, 1979, and concluded on April 14, 1979. Only first level teams took part in the tournament. Universidad de Chile won the competition for their first time, beating Colo-Colo 2–1 in the final. The points system in the first round awarded 2 points for a win, increased to 3 points if the team scored 4 or more goals.

== Calendar ==
Round	Date
Group Round	17 February 1979; 25 March 1979
Quarterfinals	28 March 1979; 4 April 1979
Semi-finals	8 April 1979
Final	14 April 1979

== Group Round ==
Key to colours in group tables
Teams that progressed to the quarterfinals

=== Group 1 ===
	UCAT	SWAN	EVER	PALE
U. Católica		3–0	3–0	0–3
S. Wanderers	1–0		1–1	2–1
Everton	1–2	4–2		2–3
Palestino	0–4	1–0	4–3	

Rank	Team	Points
1	Universidad Católica	9 (+7)
2	Palestino	9 (+1)
3	Santiago Wanderers	5
4	Everton	4

=== Group 2 ===
	UESP	CLOA	COQU	OHIG
U. Española		1–1	2–1	0–0
Cobreloa	4–2		1–1	10–0
Coquimbo U.	0–2	4–1		2–0
O'Higgins	0–5	3–0	3–1	

Rank	Team	Points
1	Unión Española	9
2	Cobreloa	8
3	Coquimbo Unido	6
4	O'Higgins	5

=== Group 3 ===
	DCON	LOTA	NAVA	GCRT
D. Concepción		1–1	2–1	4–2
Lota S.	1–2		2–3	1–0
Naval	1–0	2–0		1–1
Green Cross T.	1–2	2–1	1–1	

Rank	Team	Points
1	Deportes Concepción	10
2	Naval	8
3	Green Cross Temuco	4
4	Lota Schwager	3

=== Group 4 ===
	AUDI	SMOR	ÑUBL	COLO	UCHI	AVIA
Audax I.		0–0	5–0	0–3	0–2	0–0
S. Morning	0–1		5–2	0–4	1–1	0–4
Ñublense	1–1	0–0		1–2	2–2	2–1
Colo-Colo	3–1	1–0	4–0		2–0	4–5
U. de Chile	2–1	0–0	2–0	1–0		5–0
Aviación	2–0	1–0	6–1	1–1	1–3	

Rank	Team	Points
1	Colo-Colo	17
2	Universidad de Chile	16
3	Aviación	15
4	Audax Italiano	8
5	Santiago Morning	7
6	Ñublense	5

== Quarterfinals ==
The team with the most points after the two legs advanced to the next round. If both teams were equal on points, an extra time took place (goal difference and away goals did not count).

Teams			Scores		Tie-breakers
Team #1	Points	Team #2	1st leg	2nd leg	ET
Palestino	0:4	Cobreloa	1–3	0–2	—
Deportes Concepción	2:2	Colo-Colo	1–2	2–0	0–1
Naval	1:3	Universidad de Chile	0–0	1–4	—
Universidad Católica	1:3	Unión Española	1–1	0–2	—

== Semifinals ==
April 8, 1979

Universidad de Chile	2 – 1	Unión Española
Ramos 8'; Soto 75' (pen.)		69' (pen.) Simaldone

Estadio Nacional, Santiago
Attendance: 68,492
Referee: N. Mondría

April 8, 1979

Colo-Colo	1 – 0 (a.e.t.)	Cobreloa
Rivas 120' (pen.)

Estadio Nacional, Santiago
Attendance: 68,492
Referee: S. Vasquez

== Final ==
April 14, 1979

Universidad de Chile	2 – 1	Colo-Colo
Ramos 18'; Hoffens 51'		3' A. Herrera

Estadio Nacional, Santiago
Attendance: 74,111
Referee: A. Martínez

== Top goalscorer ==
- Luis Ramos (Universidad de Chile) 12 goals

== See also ==
- 1979 Campeonato Nacional
