= Washington Urrutia =

Chilean manager (born 1929)

Personal information
- Full name: Washington Urrutia Vistoso
- Date of birth: 22 July 1929 (age 97)
- Place of birth: Villarrica, Chile

Youth career
- Universidad de Chile

Senior career*
Years	Team	Apps	(Gls)
- Deportivo Villarrica
- Villarrica (city team)

Managerial career
- 1960–1965: Universidad de Chile (youth)
- 1964: Chile U20
- 1966–1967: Universidad de Chile (assistant)
- 1966: Universidad de Chile (caretaker)
- 1968: Universidad de Chile
- 1969–1972: Universidad de Chile (assistant)
- 1973: Santiago Wanderers
- * Club domestic league appearances and goals

Washington Urrutia Vistoso (born 22 July 1929) is a Chilean former football manager.

== Career ==
Born in Villarrica, Chile, Urrutia played for the local team, Deportivo Villarrica, and represented the city team. He also with Universidad de Chile at youth level.

As a football coach, Urrutia started working at the Universidad de Chile youth system, and later he was assistant manager of Luis Álamos (1966–1967), Alejandro Scopelli (1967–1968) and Ulises Ramos (1969–1972), being Universidad de Chile’s caretaker manager in 1966 and head coach in 1968. Following Universidad de Chile, he led Santiago Wanderers in 1973.

In 1964, he also led the Chile national under-20 team at the South American Championship.

== Personal life ==
As a student, Urrutia attended the Escuela Municipal N° 4 in Villarrica.

== Other works ==
Urrutia is a PE teacher and got a master's degree in education.

Urrutia was the president of the Football Managers Association of Chile, president of the University Sports Corporation of Chile, adviser for the National Sports Council of Chile and founder of several sports institutions.

He was the president of the section sports at the Universidad Mayor.
