= Nelsinho (footballer, born 1945) =

Brazilian footballer

Personal information
- Full name: Nelson Matilde Miranda
- Date of birth: 16 March 1945 (age 81)
- Place of birth: Nova Lima, Brazil
- Positions: Attacking midfielder; forward

Senior career*
| Years | Team | Apps | (Gls) |
| 1964–1966 | Guarani | | |
| 1967–1970 | São Paulo | 71 | (16) |
| 1970 | Atlético Paranaense | | |
| 1971–1978 | Barcelona | | |
| 1978–1979 | Emelec | | |
- * Club domestic league appearances and goals as of 9 October 2023

Nelson Matilde Miranda (born 16 March 1945 in Nova Lima), better known as Nelsinho, is a Brazilian former professional footballer who played as an attacking midfielder and forward.

== Career ==
Nelsinho is one of the 11 players "immortalized" in Campinas after Guarani beat Pelé's Santos FC by 5–1 in 1964. In Ecuadorian football, he earned the nickname 'Jinete Nelsinho' due to his bold style of play. He was Ecuadorian champion for the two big clubs in Guayaquil, and top scorer in the competition in 1972.

== Honours ==
Athletico Paranaense

- Campeonato Paranaense: 1970

Barcelona

- Campeonato Ecuatoriano de Fútbol Serie A: 1971

Emelec

- Campeonato Ecuatoriano de Fútbol Serie A: 1979

Individual

- 1972 Campeonato Ecuatoriano de Fútbol Serie A top scorer: 15 goals
