= Víctor Hugo Castañeda =

Chilean footballer and manager (born 1962)

Personal information
- Full name: Víctor Hugo Castañeda
- Date of birth: July 6, 1962 (age 64)
- Place of birth: San Vicente de Tagua Tagua, Chile
- Height: 1.71 m (5 ft 7 1/2 in)
- Position: Midfielder

Youth career
- Palestino

Senior career*
Years	Team	Apps	(Gls)
1981–1986	Palestino		
1987–1988	Deportes Concepción		
1989–1992	Palestino		
1992–1997	Universidad de Chile		

International career
1996–1997	Chile	11	(0)

Managerial career
- 1998: Chile (assistant)
- 1999–2000: Universidad de Chile (youth)
- 2001: Universidad de Chile (assistant)
- 2002–2003: Universidad de Chile
- 2005–2010: Deportes La Serena
- 2011–2012: Universidad de Concepción
- 2012–2013: Everton
- 2014–2015: Coquimbo Unido
- 2016: Universidad de Chile
- * Club domestic league appearances and goals

Víctor Hugo Castañeda (born June 21, 1962) is a Chilean football former footballer and current manager.

== Career ==
=== Player ===
Castañeda was born in San Vicente de Tagua Tagua, and played for Palestino most of his career. He joined Universidad de Chile in 1992, and obtained 2 National Titles (1994 and 1995).

He was part of the Chile national football team during the 1998 FIFA World Cup qualifiers, but retired before he could play in the World Cup and was invited to be a part of Nelson Acosta's staff during the World Cup.

=== Manager ===
In 2002, he was signed as coach of Universidad de Chile, a post that he left in 2003 after irregular campaigns. In 2005, Castañeda arrived to Deportes La Serena. That year, in the 2005 Clausura, the team got to the semifinals after winning 4-1 in penalties to Colo Colo, but then, lost to Universidad Católica. After a narrowness the later years, La Serena finished second in the regular phase of the 2009 Clausura, the best place ever in the history of the team. La Serena reached semifinals that tournament.

In the last days of April 2011, he was signed as the new coach of Universidad de Concepción, but for less than a year as he was on March 26, 2012 fired due to bad results.

On May 3, 2012, he signed as manager of Everton, a team from the Chilean Primera División B. On November 26, 2012, Everton was promoted to Chilean Primera División.

== Personal life ==
He belongs to a football family since his father, Hugo, and his uncles Víctor, Rolando and Gerardo, were professional footballers. He also played alongside his younger brother, Cristián, for Palestino, Universidad de Chile and the Chile national team. In addition, his cousins Marco and Roly were with the Palestino youth ranks, as well as his uncle Manuel, who was with the reserve team.

In 2021, he was a candidate for both Alcalde of La Serena and deputy for the Coquimbo Region, supported by UDI, but he wasn't elected.

== Honours ==
=== Player ===
==== Club ====
Universidad de Chile

- Primera División de Chile (2): 1994, 1995
