= 1972 Campeonato Ecuatoriano de Fútbol Serie A =

Ecuadorian Serie A
- Season: 1972
- Champions: Emelec
- Top goalscorer: Nelsinho (Barcelona), 15 goals

The 1972 Campeonato Ecuatoriano de Fútbol Serie A, the first division of Ecuadorian football (soccer), was played by 16 teams. The champion was Emelec.

== First stage ==
Pos	Team	Pld	W	D	L	GF	GA	GD	Pts	Qualification or relegation
1	El Nacional	14	7	4	3	33	19	+14	18	Qualified to the Liguilla Final
2	Barcelona	14	7	3	4	24	15	+9	17	Qualified to the Liguilla Final
3	Emelec	14	5	7	2	17	12	+5	17	
4	Macará	14	5	4	5	24	25	−1	14	
5	América de Quito	14	4	5	5	15	17	−2	13	
6	LDU Quito	14	4	5	5	18	23	−5	13	
7	Universidad Católica	14	5	2	7	17	18	−1	12	Relegated to the Serie B
8	Olmedo	14	2	4	8	20	39	−19	8	Relegated to the Serie B

Source: RSSSF - 1972 Serie A

Home \ Away	CDA	BSC	EN	CSE	LDQ	MAC	CDO	UC
América de Quito		1–0	0–0	1–0	1–0	1–3	2–2	0–1
Barcelona	2–1		2–0	2–2	3–0	2–1	3–1	4–1
El Nacional	2–2	3–1		3–0	3–1	5–2	8–3	1–0
Emelec	0–0	0–0	3–1		1–1	0–0	4–1	1–0
LDU Quito	1–1	2–2	1–4	1–1		3–2	3–1	3–2
Macará	2–1	0–2	1–0	2–2	0–1		4–2	3–2
Olmedo	1–3	1–0	3–3	0–1	1–1	3–3		1–0
Universidad Católica	3–1	2–1	0–0	0–2	1–0	1–1	4–0	

Source: RSSSF - 1972 Serie A
Legend: Blue = home team win; Yellow = draw; Red = away team win.

== Second stage ==
Pos	Team	Pld	W	D	L	GF	GA	GD	Pts	Qualification or relegation
1	Emelec	14	7	6	1	28	14	+14	20	Qualified to the Liguilla Final
2	Barcelona	14	7	3	4	26	15	+11	17	
3	Deportivo Quito	14	6	5	3	23	23	0	17	
4	El Nacional	14	5	4	5	14	16	−2	14	
5	LDU Portoviejo	14	3	6	5	18	19	−1	12	
6	América de Quito	14	4	3	7	13	18	−5	11	
7	LDU Quito	14	3	5	6	18	24	−6	11	Qualified to the Relegation play-off
8	Macará	14	3	4	7	14	25	−11	10	

Source: RSSSF - 1972 Serie A

Home \ Away	CDA	BSC	SDQ	EN	CSE	LDP	LDQ	MAC
América de Quito		1–0	1–1	0–1	0–0	1–1	2–0	0–1
Barcelona	3–1		6–0	3–0	1–3	1–1	2–0	3–2
Deportivo Quito	1–2	1–0		2–1	0–0	3–1	2–2	2–1
El Nacional	1–0	1–1	1–3		0–2	1–0	1–2	3–0
Emelec	3–1	2–4	2–2	0–0		0–0	2–0	7–2
LDU Portoviejo	0–1	1–1	2–1	2–2	2–3		1–1	1–0
LDU Quito	4–2	0–1	3–3	0–1	1–3	4–3		0–0
Macará	2–1	2–0	1–2	1–1	1–1	0–3	1–1	

Source: RSSSF - 1972 Serie A
Legend: Blue = home team win; Yellow = draw; Red = away team win.

== Liguilla Final ==
Pos	Team	Pld	W	D	L	GF	GA	GD	Pts	Qualification
1	Emelec	4	2	1	1	9	5	+4	5	Champions
2	El Nacional	4	1	2	1	8	6	+2	4	Runners-up
3	Barcelona	4	1	1	2	6	12	−6	3	

Source: RSSSF - 1972 Serie A

Home \ Away	BSC	EN	CSE
Barcelona		3–3	2–1
El Nacional	3–0		2–2
Emelec	5–1	1–0	

Source: RSSSF - 1972 Serie A
Legend: Blue = home team win; Yellow = draw; Red = away team win.

== Relegation play-off ==
Pos	Team	Pld	W	D	L	GF	GA	GD	Pts	Promotion or relegation
1	Universidad Católica	3	2	1	0	5	2	+3	5	Promoted to the 1973 Serie A
2	LDU Quito	3	0	1	2	2	5	−3	1	Relegated to the Segunda Categoría

Source: RSSSF - 1972 Serie A
