= Johnny Ashwell =

Paraguayan-Chilean footballer (born 1954)

Personal information
- Full name: Johnny Armando Ashwell Fernández
- Date of birth: 1 February 1954 (age 72)
- Place of birth: Encarnación, Paraguay
- Position: Defender

Youth career
- Olimpia

Senior career*
Years	Team	Apps	(Gls)
1974–1982	Universidad de Chile	222	(3)
1974	→ Unión La Calera (loan)	34	(0)
1975	→ O'Higgins (loan)	33	(1)
1983–1987	Everton	113	(0)
Total		402	(4)
Medal record
First place	Copa Chile	1979
- * Club domestic league appearances and goals

Johnny Armando Ashwell Fernández (born 1 February 1954) is a Paraguayan naturalized Chilean former footballer who played for Universidad de Chile in the Primera Division of Chile.

== Playing career ==
A product of Olimpia in his country of birth, Ashwell came to Chile in 1974 to study engineering at the University of Chile and joined Club Universidad de Chile. After playing on loan at Unión La Calera and O'Higgins, he returned to Universidad de Chile in 1976. His last club was Everton de Viña del Mar, with whom he won the 1984 Copa Polla Gol.

== Managerial career ==
In 2007, he joined Universidad de Chile as Sport Manager. After, he held the same charge in Unión Española.

== Personal life ==
Ashwell naturalized Chilean by residence.
