= Renato Huerta =

Chilean footballer

Personal information
- Full name: Renato Huerta Vallejos
- Date of birth: 17 February 2004 (age 22)
- Place of birth: La Florida, Santiago, Chile
- Height: 1.69 m (5 ft 7 in)
- Position: Forward

Team information
- Current team: Cobresal (on loan from Universidad de Chile)

Youth career
- 2014–2022: Universidad de Chile

Senior career*
Years	Team	Apps	(Gls)
2023–	Universidad de Chile	13	(0)
2024	→ Unión La Calera (loan)	26	(2)
2025	→ Unión Española (loan)	4	(0)
2026–	→ Cobresal (loan)	0	(0)

International career
2022	Chile U20	6	(0)
- * Club domestic league appearances and goals as of 9 January 2026

Renato Huerta Vallejos (born 17 February 2004) is a Chilean footballer who plays as a forward for Chilean Primera División side Cobresal on loan from Universidad de Chile

== Club career ==
Born in La Florida commune, Santiago de Chile, Huerta joined the Universidad de Chile youth ranks at the age of 10, was promoted to the first team by Mauricio Pellegrino in 2023 and signed his first professional contract on 13 January. He made his professional debut in the 1–3 loss against Huachipato on 23 January of the same year for the Chilean Primera División.

In February 2024, Huerta was loaned out to Unión La Calera. Back to Universidad de Chile, he was loaned out to Unión Española for the second half of 2025.

In January 2026, Huerta was loaned out to Cobresal.

== International career ==
Huerta represented the Chile national U20 team during 2022 in friendlies and the South American Games.

== Personal life ==
Huerta holds dual Chilean-Spanish nationality. His family, parents and brothers, moved to Spain in 2022.
