= Carlos Soto (footballer, born 1959) =

Chilean footballer

Personal information
- Full name: Carlos Fredy Soto Sandoval
- Date of birth: 10 November 1959 (age 66)
- Place of birth: Temuco, Chile
- Position: Defender

Youth career
- Ñublense

Senior career*
Years	Team	Apps	(Gls)
1977–1982	Ñublense		
1983	Palestino	40	(1)
1984–1985	Colo-Colo	37	(1)
1986–1987	Palestino	36	(3)
1987–1990	Tampico Madero		
1990–1991	Querétaro		
1991	Universidad de Chile	18	(0)
1992	Palestino	16	(0)
1993	Deportes Antofagasta	13	(0)
1994–1996	Regional Atacama	59	(2)

International career
1987	Chile	2	(1)
- * Club domestic league appearances and goals

Carlos Fredy Soto Sandoval (born 10 November 1959) is a Chilean former professional footballer who played as a defender for clubs in Chile and Mexico.

== Club career ==
A product of Ñublense youth system, Soto stayed with the club until the 1982 season. In the Chilean Primera División, he also played for Palestino, Colo-Colo, Universidad de Chile, Deportes Antofagasta and Regional Atacama, his last club. Along with Colo-Colo, he won the 1985 Copa Polla Gol. In addition, as a player of Regional Atacama, he took part in the match where Colo-Colo gave the biggest hammering in its history, a 10–0 win, on 27 August 1995.

Abroad he played in Mexico between 1987 and 1991 for both Tampico Madero and Querétaro. In Tampico Madero, he coincided with his compatriot Mariano Puyol.

== International career ==
Soto made two appearances and scored a goal for the Chile national team at friendly matches in 1987.

== Honours ==
Colo-Colo

- Copa Polla Gol: 1985
