= Lucas Romero (Paraguayan footballer) =

Paraguayan footballer

Personal information
- Full name: Lucas Ramón Romero Gómez
- Date of birth: 29 August 2002 (age 24)
- Place of birth: Choré, Paraguay
- Height: 1.90 m (6 ft 3 in)
- Position: Defensive midfielder

Team information
- Current team: Juárez
- Number: 15

Youth career
- Coronel Panchito López
- Libertad
- 2023: Tacuary

Senior career*
Years	Team	Apps	(Gls)
2023–2025	Tacuary	25	(0)
2025	→ Recoleta (loan)	34	(1)
2025–2026	Recoleta	0	(0)
2026	→ Universidad de Chile (loan)	5	(0)
2026–	Juárez	0	(0)

International career^{‡}
2025–	Paraguay	2	(0)
- * Club domestic league appearances and goals as of 27 June 2026 ‡ National team caps and goals as of 22:41, 27 March 2026 (UTC)

Lucas Ramón Romero Gómez (born 29 August 2002) is a Paraguayan professional footballer who plays as a defensive midfielder for Liga MX club Juárez and the Paraguay national team.

== Club career ==
Romero was with Coronel Panchito López and Libertad before joining Tacuary. He began his senior career with Tacuary in 2023. On 26 May 2025, he transferred to Recoleta.

In 2025, Romero was loaned out to Recoleta for a year. In October of the same year, Romero was permanently transferred to Recoleta.

In January 2026, he moved abroad and joined Chilean club Universidad de Chile on a one-year loan with a purchase option. He ended his loan with them in June of the same year and moved to Liga MX club Juárez on a three-year contract.

== International career ==
Romero was called up to the senior Paraguay national team for a set of friendlies in November 2025.

== Career statistics ==
=== International ===
As of match played 27 March 2026

Appearances and goals by national team and year
National team	Year	Apps	Goals
Paraguay	2025	1	0
Paraguay	2026	1	0
Total		2	0
