= Gonzalo Reyna =

Argentine footballer

Personal information
- Full name: Gonzalo Ezequiel Reyna
- Date of birth: 23 July 2006 (age 20)
- Place of birth: Villa María, Córdoba, Argentina
- Height: 1.69 m (5 ft 7 in)
- Position: Winger

Team information
- Current team: Universidad de Chile (on loan from Racing Club)

Youth career
- 2018–2019: Lanús
- 2019–2025: Racing Club

Senior career*
Years	Team	Apps	(Gls)
2025–	Racing Club	2	(0)
2025	→ Boston River (loan)	14	(0)
2026–	→ Universidad de Chile (loan)	0	(0)
- * Club domestic league appearances and goals as of 5 July 2026

Gonzalo Ezequiel Reyna (born 23 July 2006) is an Argentine footballer who plays as a winger for Chilean Primera División club Universidad de Chile on loan from Racing Club.

== Career ==
Born in Villa María, Córdoba, Argentina, Reyna was with Lanús before joining the Racing Club de Avellaneda youth ranks. He was promoted to the first team in 2025 under Gustavo Costas and made his professional debut in the 2–0 home victory against San Lorenzo de Almagro for the Argentine Primera División.

In January 2026, Reyna moved abroad and joined on loan to Uruguayan Primera División club Boston River and took part in the Copa Sudamericana. In July of the same year, he switched to Chilean Primera División club Universidad de Chile on a one-year loan with a purchase option for the 50% of his rights.
