= Ulises Ramos =

Chilean footballer (1919–2002)

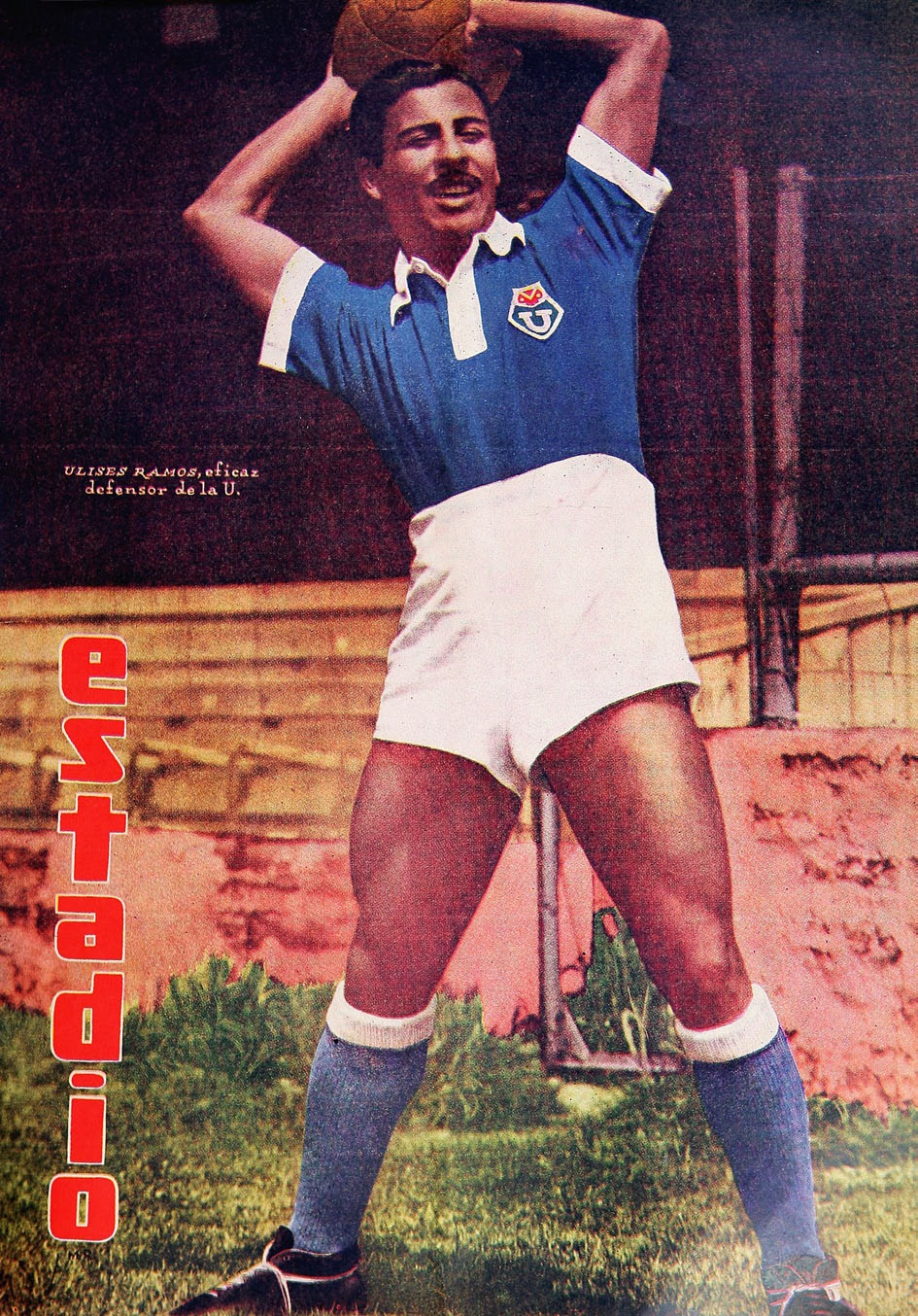
- Fabián Ulises Ramos Espínola

Personal information
- Full name: Fabián Ulises Ramos Espínola
- Date of birth: 4 November 1919
- Place of birth: Tocopilla, Chile
- Date of death: 13 August 2002 (aged 82)
- Place of death: Santiago, Chile
- Position: Striker

Senior career*
Years	Team	Apps	(Gls)
1939	Audax Italiano	13	(3)
1940–1951	Universidad de Chile	260	(40)

Managerial career
- 1969–1974: Universidad de Chile
- 1978: Universidad de Chile
- 1983–1984: Universidad de Chile
- * Club domestic league appearances and goals as of 30 August 2016

Fabián Ulises Ramos Espínola (4 November 1919 – 13 August 2002) was a Chilean footballer and manager.

== Club career ==
Ramos was born in Tocopilla in 1919 to a middle-class family. Ten years later, he alongside his family moved to the capital Santiago. He attended Instituto Nacional and once graduated of there, he entered to study dentistry at University of Chile in 1937.

In 1939, he joined Audax Italiano to play professional football. After completing three goals in thirteen games with the Italics during that league season, Ramos joined the freshly founded football department of his alma mater in 1940. In his first season at Universidad de Chile, he was part of the team which reached the first league title of the football team. He remained at the team eleven years, retiring from football in 1951, completing a total of 217 matches and scoring 43 goals.

Thirty years later, in 1969, Ramos became as manager of Universidad de Chile, reaching a league title and achieving being the first to be champion as player and coach of the club.

On 13 August 2002, he died aged 82.

== Honours ==
=== Universidad de Chile ===
==== Footballer ====
- Primera División de Chile (1): 1940

==== Manager ====
- Primera División de Chile (1): 1969
