= Marco Fajre =

Chilean footballer

Personal information
- Full name: Marco Antonio Fajre Díaz
- Date of birth: 28 November 1963 (age 62)
- Place of birth: Santiago, Chile
- Position: Forward

Youth career
- Palestino

Senior career*
Years	Team	Apps	(Gls)
1981–1985	Palestino	17	(1)
1982	→ Súper Lo Miranda (loan)	–	(–)
1985	→ Súper Lo Miranda (loan)		
1986–1988	Deportes Temuco		
1989–1990	Universidad de Chile	35	(13)
1991–1992	FC Baden		
1992	Palestino	12	(1)
1993	Audax Italiano	–	(–)
1993	Santiago Wanderers	15	(4)
1994	Cobresal	10	(2)
1997	Deportes Temuco	5	(0)

Managerial career
- Universidad de Chile (youth)
- 2007: Provincial Temuco
- * Club domestic league appearances and goals

Marco Antonio Fajre Díaz (born 28 November 1963) is a Chilean former football manager and player who played as a forward. Besides Chile, he played in Switzerland.

== Club career ==
A product of Palestino, Fajre made his professional debut at the age of eighteen and played for them until 1984, with seasons on loan to Súper Lo Miranda in the Tercera División and the Segunda División.

In the Chilean Primera División, he later played for Universidad de Chile, Palestino again, Cobresal and Deportes Temuco, his last club.

In 1990, he scored a goal for Universidad de Chile in a friendly match against the Swiss club St. Gallen. After the match, he was informed about his transfer to the also Swiss club FC Baden. He played for them in 1991–92 in the Nationalliga B and scored about ten goals.

In the Chilean Segunda División, he also played for Deportes Temuco, where he scored about sixty goals between 1986 and 1988, Universidad de Chile and Santiago Wanderers. He was a member of Universidad de Chile in the 1989 season, the only time they were in that division, winning the championship with Fajre as the team top goalscorer with twelve goals.

== Coaching career ==
As a football coach, Fajre worked for the Universidad de Chile youth system in Temuco for about nine years, taking part of the training of players such as Iván Rozas and José Gatica. In 2007, he led Provincial Temuco in the Chilean Tercera División. He has also worked for football academies like the Escuela de Fútbol Municipal (Municipal Football Academy) of Pitrufquén.

== Personal life ==
Fajre is of Palestinian descent.

He is the uncle of the Chilean football player and coach, Nicole Fajre.

Fajre was a candidate to the Regional Council of Araucanía for the communes of Temuco and Padre Las Casas in the 2024 Chilean regional elections.
