= 1980 Copa Libertadores =

21st season of Copa Libertadores

1980 Copa Libertadores de América
Tournament details
- Dates: February 16 – August 6
- Teams: 21 (from 10 associations)

Final positions
- Champions: (Uruguay) Nacional (2nd title)
- Runners-up: (Brazil) Internacional

Tournament statistics
- Matches played: 75
- Goals scored: 160 (2.13 per match)

The Copa Libertadores 1980 was the 21st edition of the Copa Libertadores, CONMEBOL's annual international club tournament. Nacional of Uruguay won the competition defeating Brazilian club Internacional. Defending champion Olimpia were eliminated in the semifinals.

== Qualified teams ==
Country	Team	Qualify method
CONMEBOL (1 berth)	Olimpia	1979 Copa Libertadores champion
Argentina; 2 berths	River Plate	1979 Campeonato Metropolitano champions 1979 Campeonato Nacional champions
Argentina; 2 berths	Vélez Sarsfield	1979 Copa Libertadores Play-off winner
Bolivia; 2 berths	Oriente Petrolero	1979 Primera División champion
Bolivia; 2 berths	The Strongest	1979 Primera División runner-up
Brazil; 2 berths	Internacional	1979 Campeonato Brasileiro Série A champion
Brazil; 2 berths	Vasco da Gama	1979 Campeonato Brasileiro Série A 2nd place
Chile; 2 berths	Colo-Colo	1979 Primera División champion
Chile; 2 berths	O'Higgins	1979 Liguilla Pre-Copa Libertadores winner
Colombia; 2 berths	América de Cali	1979 Campeonato Profesional champion
Colombia; 2 berths	Santa Fe	1979 Campeonato Profesional runner-up
Ecuador; 2 berths	Emelec	1979 Campeonato Ecuatoriano de Fútbol Serie A champion
Ecuador; 2 berths	Universidad Católica	1979 Campeonato Ecuatoriano de Fútbol Serie A runner-up
Paraguay; 2 berths	Sol de América	1979 Primera División runner-up
Paraguay; 2 berths	Cerro Porteño	1979 Primera División third place
Peru; 2 berths	Sporting Cristal	1979 Torneo Descentralizado champion
Peru; 2 berths	Atlético Chalaco	1979 Torneo Descentralizado runner-up
Uruguay; 2 berths	Defensor Sporting	1979 Liguilla Pre-Libertadores winner
Uruguay; 2 berths	Nacional	1979 Liguilla Pre-Libertadores runner-up
Venezuela; 2 berths	Deportivo Táchira	1979 Primera División champion
Venezuela; 2 berths	Deportivo Galicia	1979 Primera División runner-up

== Draw ==
The champions and runners-up of each football association were drawn into the same group along with another football association's participating teams. Three clubs from Paraguay competed as Olimpia was champion of the 1979 Copa Libertadores. They entered the tournament in the Semifinals.

Group 1	Group 2	Group 3	Group 4	Group 5
Argentina; Peru	Bolivia; Uruguay	Brazil; Venezuela	Colombia; Ecuador	Chile; Paraguay

== Group stage ==
=== Group 1 ===
Pos	Team	Pld	W	D	L	GF	GA	GD	Pts	Qualification	(Argentina) VEL	(Argentina) RIV	(Peru) SCR	(Peru) CHA
1	(Argentina) Vélez Sársfield	6	4	2	0	10	2	+8	10	Qualified to the Semifinals	—	0–0	2–0	5–2
2	(Argentina) River Plate	6	4	2	0	10	3	+7	10		0–0	—	3–2	3–0
3	(Peru) Sporting Cristal	6	1	1	4	5	9	−4	3		0–1	1–2	—	0–0
4	(Peru) Atlético Chalaco	6	0	1	5	3	14	−11	1		0–2	0–2	1–2	—

Play Off Vélez Sársfield 1-1 a.e.t. River Plate Vélez Sarsfield qualify on better goal difference in group

=== Group 2 ===
Pos	Team	Pld	W	D	L	GF	GA	GD	Pts	Qualification	(Uruguay) NAC	(Bolivia) STR	(Uruguay) DEF	(Bolivia) ORI
1	(Uruguay) Nacional	6	5	0	1	14	4	+10	10	Qualified to the Semifinals	—	2–0	1–0	5–0
2	(Bolivia) The Strongest	6	3	1	2	9	6	+3	7		3–0	—	2–0	3–2
3	(Uruguay) Defensor Sporting	6	1	2	3	3	8	−5	4		0–3	1–1	—	1–1
4	(Bolivia) Oriente Petrolero	6	1	1	4	5	13	−8	3		1–3	1–0	0–1	—

=== Group 3 ===
Pos	Team	Pld	W	D	L	GF	GA	GD	Pts	Qualification	(Brazil) INT	(Brazil) VAS	(Venezuela) GAL	(Venezuela) TAC
1	(Brazil) Internacional	6	4	1	1	10	3	+7	9	Qualified to the Semifinals	—	2–1	2–0	4–0
2	(Brazil) Vasco da Gama	6	3	2	1	7	2	+5	8		0–0	—	4–0	1–0
3	(Venezuela) Deportivo Galicia	6	3	1	2	4	7	−3	7		2–1	0–0	—	1–0
4	(Venezuela) Deportivo Táchira	6	0	0	6	0	9	−9	0		0–1	0–1	0–1	—

=== Group 4 ===
Pos	Team	Pld	W	D	L	GF	GA	GD	Pts	Qualification	(Colombia) AME	(Ecuador) CAT	(Colombia) SFE	(Ecuador) EME
1	(Colombia) América de Cali	6	4	1	1	11	7	+4	9	Qualified to the Semifinals	—	1–0	1–0	4–1
2	(Ecuador) Universidad Católica	6	3	0	3	10	5	+5	6		4–2	—	1–0	5–0
3	(Colombia) Santa Fe	6	2	1	3	5	5	0	5		1–1	1–0	—	1–2
4	(Ecuador) Emelec	6	2	0	4	5	14	−9	4		1–2	1–0	0–2	—

=== Group 5 ===
Pos	Team	Pld	W	D	L	GF	GA	GD	Pts	Qualification	(Chile) OHI	(Paraguay) CER	(Chile) COL	(Paraguay) SOL
1	(Chile) O'Higgins	6	2	2	2	8	6	+2	6	Qualified to the Semifinals	—	0–0	1–3	2–0
2	(Paraguay) Cerro Porteño	6	2	2	2	8	7	+1	6		1–0	—	5–3	0–0
3	(Chile) Colo-Colo	6	2	2	2	11	11	0	6		1–1	2–1	—	1–1
4	(Paraguay) Sol de América	6	2	2	2	6	9	−3	6		1–4	2–1	2–1	—

== Semifinals ==
=== Group A ===
Pos	Team	Pld	W	D	L	GF	GA	GD	Pts	Qualification	(Brazil) INT	(Colombia) AME	(Argentina) VEL
1	(Brazil) Internacional	4	2	2	0	4	1	+3	6	Qualified to the Final	—	0–0	3–1
2	(Colombia) América de Cali	4	0	4	0	0	0	0	4		0–0	—	0–0
3	(Argentina) Vélez Sarsfield	4	0	2	2	1	4	−3	2		0–1	0–0	—

=== Group B ===
Pos	Team	Pld	W	D	L	GF	GA	GD	Pts	Qualification	(Uruguay) NAC	(Paraguay) OLI	(Chile) OHI
1	(Uruguay) Nacional	4	3	1	0	5	1	+4	7	Qualified to the Final	—	1–1	2–0
2	(Paraguay) Olimpia	4	2	1	1	4	2	+2	5		0–1	—	2–0
3	(Chile) O'Higgins	4	0	0	4	0	6	−6	0		0–1	0–1	—

== Finals ==
Team 1	Agg.	Team 2	1st leg	2nd leg
Internacional (Brazil)	0–1	(Uruguay) Nacional	0–0	0–1

== Champion ==
Copa Libertadores
1980 Champions

Nacional
Second Title
