= Mariano Puyol =

Chilean footballer (born 1960)

Personal information
- Full name: Mariano Patricio Puyol Correa
- Date of birth: 3 June 1960 (age 66)
- Place of birth: Santiago, Chile
- Positions: Left winger; attacking midfielder

Youth career
- Universidad de Chile

Senior career*
Years	Team	Apps	(Gls)
1977–1981	Universidad de Chile		
1978	→ Deportes Concepción (loan)		
1982	Ñublense		
1982–1983	Unión San Felipe		
1984–1986	Universidad de Chile		
1986–1987	Cruz Azul		
1988	Tampico Madero		
1989–1990	Deportes La Serena		
1990–1993	Universidad de Chile		
1994	Rangers		

International career
1986	Chile	1	(1)

Managerial career
- 1997–2010: Universidad de Chile (youth)
- 2011–2013: Chile U15
- 2013: Chile U17
- 2014: Gendarmería de Chile
- 2019–2021: Universidad de Chile (youth)
- * Club domestic league appearances and goals

Mariano Patricio Puyol Correa (born 3 June 1960) is a Chilean football manager and former professional footballer who played as a left winger or attacking midfielder for clubs in Chile and Mexico.

== Club career ==
A product of Universidad de Chile youth system, he played for the club in four steps, making 281 and scoring 75 goals in total. In his last step he performed as team captain. Along with the club he won the 1979 Copa Polla Gol.

In Chile, he also played for Deportes Concepción, Ñublense, Unión San Felipe, Deportes La Serena and Rangers de Talca.

In Mexico, he played for Cruz Azul and Tampico Madero, where the coach was the Chilean Carlos Reinoso. In Tampico Madero, he coincided with his compatriot Carlos Soto.

== International career ==
Puyol made an appearance for the Chile national team in a friendly match versus Brazil on 7 May 1986, scoring a goal.

== Coaching career ==
Following his retirement, Puyol worked for the Universidad de Chile youth system for 13 years between 1997 and 2010. From 2011 to 2013, he was in charge of coaching Chile at under-15 level. In 2013 he also assumed as coach of Chile at under-17 level, being released in April.

In 2014 he had an experience in the Chilean Tercera B by coaching club Gendarmería de Chile.

In 2019 he returned to Universidad de Chile, coaching at under-12 level until July 2021.

== Personal life ==
His father, Pablo, was a footballer who played for Santiago Morning in the 1940s.

Strongly bound to Club Universidad de Chile, he has been a member of Más Allá del Horizonte (Beyond The Horizon), the association of former players. He has also taken part in friendly matches of historical players of Universidad de Chile alongside former players such as Sergio Vargas, Cristián Castañeda, Mauricio Aros, Víctor Bascuñán, among others.

== Honours ==
=== Player ===
Universidad de Chile

- Copa Polla Gol: 1979
