= Lucas Barrera =

Argentine footballer

Personal information
- Full name: Lucas Emilio Barrera Halicki
- Date of birth: 21 April 2006 (age 20)
- Place of birth: Neuquén, Argentina
- Height: 1.82 m (6 ft 0 in)
- Position: Midfielder

Team information
- Current team: Universidad de Chile
- Number: 29

Youth career
- 2023–2024: Universidad Católica
- 2025–2026: Universidad de Chile

Senior career*
Years	Team	Apps	(Gls)
2026–	Universidad de Chile	14	(0)
- * Club domestic league appearances and goals as of 5 July 2026

Lucas Emilio Barrera Halicki (born 21 April 2006) is an Argentine footballer who plays as a midfielder for Chilean Primera División club Universidad de Chile.

== Career ==
Born in Neuquén, Argentina, Barrera started his career at amateur level in Neuquén Province before moving to Chile thanks to Gustavo Canales and joining the Universidad Católica youth ranks for about two years. In 2025, he switched to classic rival, Universidad de Chile and was included in the squad for the Copa Sudamericana semi-finals against Lanús under Gustavo Álvarez. He signed his first professional contract in November 2025 and was promoted to the first team the next season under Fernando Gago.

Barrera made his professional debut in the 1–3 away win against Audax Italiano in the Copa de la Liga on 31 March 2026 making an assist. Five days later, he made his debut in the Chilean Primera División in the 4–0 home victory against Deportes La Serena.

== Personal life ==
Barrera is of Chilean descent since his great-grandfather in Chilean.
