= Luis Ibarra (footballer) =

Chilean footballer and manager (1937–2013)

Personal information
- Full name: Luis Osvaldo Mariano Ibarra Araya
- Date of birth: 3 February 1937
- Place of birth: Concepción, Chile
- Date of death: 12 November 2013 (aged 76)
- Place of death: Santiago, Chile
- Position: Midfielder

Youth career
- Universidad de Chile

Senior career*
Years	Team	Apps	(Gls)
1954–1962	Universidad de Chile	90	(23)
1962	Unión San Felipe	8	(1)
1963–1964	Magallanes	41	(8)
Total		139	(32)

Managerial career
- 1972: Universidad de Chile (youth)
- 1973: Antofagasta Portuario
- 1974: Deportes La Serena
- 1974–1975: Jorge Wilstermann
- 1975: Ñublense
- 1975–1977: Universidad de Chile
- 1978–1979: Coquimbo Unido
- 1980–1982: Naval
- 1983: Santiago Wanderers
- 1983: Chile
- 1984: Naval
- 1984: Huachipato
- 1985: Universidad de Chile
- 1986: Chile
- 1986–1987: Chile U20
- 1988: Palestino
- 1989: Universidad de Chile
- 1990: Naval
- * Club domestic league appearances and goals

Luis Osvaldo Mariano Ibarra Araya (3 February 1937 – 12 November 2013) was a Chilean footballer and manager.

== Career ==
As a player, Ibarra played for Universidad de Chile, Unión San Felipe and Magallanes in the Chilean top division.

A well-known manager in his homeland, Ibarra mainly led clubs in the top division: Antofagasta Portuario, Deportes La Serena, Universidad de Chile, Coquimbo Unido, Naval, Santiago Wanderers, Huachipato and Palestino.

In the second level, he led Ñublense and Universidad de Chile, becoming the coach who returned the second one to first tier after winning Segunda División title.

Abroad, he had a stint with Bolivian club Jorge Wilstermann in 1974–75, coinciding with his compatriot Víctor Villalón as a player, leading them at the 1975 Copa Libertadores.

== Honours ==
=== Player ===
Universidad de Chile

- Campeonato Nacional (Chile): 1959

=== Manager ===
Universidad de Chile

- Segunda División: 1989
