= Jorge Socías =

Chilean footballer (born 1950)

Personal information
- Full name: Jorge Luis Alberto Socías Tuset
- Date of birth: 26 October 1951 (age 75)
- Place of birth: Santiago, Chile
- Height: 1.75 m (5 ft 9 in)
- Position: Midfielder

Senior career*
| Years | Team | Apps | (Gls) |
| 1971–1983 | Universidad de Chile | 402 | (88) |
| 1984–1985 | Unión San Felipe | 64 | (6) |
| Total | | 466 | (94) |

International career
| 1972 | Chile Pre-Olympic | | |
| 1974–1977 | Chile | 13 | (1) |

Managerial career
- 1987: Deportes Puerto Montt
- 1987: Universidad de Chile (youth)
- 1990–1991: Banco del Estado
- 1992–1994: Universidad de Chile (assistant)
- 1994–1995: Universidad de Chile
- 1996: O'Higgins
- 1997: Santiago Wanderers
- 2001–2002: Cobresal
- 2003–2004: Everton
- 2005: Cobreloa
- 2007: Universidad de Chile
- 2007–2008: Unión La Calera
- 2010: Universidad San Sebastián
- 2012: Curicó Unido
- * Club domestic league appearances and goals

Jorge Luis Socías Tuset (born 26 October 1951) is a Chilean former footballer.

He was part of the national team’s 1974 FIFA World Cup squad.

== Coaching career ==
Socías served as assistant coach of Arturo Salah before assuming as manager of Universidad de Chile in 1994.

== Honours ==
=== Player ===
Universidad de Chile

- Copa Chile: 1979

=== Manager ===
Universidad de Chile

- Primera División de Chile (2): 1994, 1995

Everton

- Primera B: 2003

Individual

- Don Balón Awards - Best manager: 1995
- Manuel Aburto Award to Sport Achievements: 1996
