= Provincial Temuco =

Chilean football club

- Full name: Club de Deportes Provincial Temuco
- Founded: 2007
- Ground: Municipal Germán Becker; Temuco, Chile
- Capacity: 18,125
- Chairman: Gabriel Flores
- Manager: Marcos Wenopal Pico
- League: Tercera División
Home colours	Away colours

Club de Deportes Provincial Temuco is a Chilean football club. Its home town is Temuco, Chile.

The club was founded in 2007 and participated for 2 years in Tercera División A.

The club also fields a women's team.

== Seasons played ==
- 3 seasons in Tercera División A

== See also ==
- Chilean football league system
