= 1979 Campeonato Ecuatoriano de Fútbol Serie A =

Campeonato Ecuatoriano de Fútbol
- Season: 1979
- Champions: Emelec
- Relegated: Aucas; Bonita Banana; Deportivo Quito; El Nacional
- Copa Libertadores: Emelec; Universidad Católica
- Matches: 210
- Goals: 529 (2.52 per match)

The 1979 Campeonato Ecuatoriano de Fútbol de la Serie A was the 21st national championship for football teams in Ecuador.

== Teams ==
The number of teams for this season was played by 12 teams. Aucas and Manta promoted as winners of First Stage of Serie B.

| Club | City |
|---|---|
| América de Quito | Quito |
| Aucas | Quito |
| Barcelona | Guayaquil |
| Bonita Banana | Machala |
| Deportivo Cuenca | Cuenca |
| Deportivo Quito | Quito |
| El Nacional | Quito |
| Emelec | Guayaquil |
| LDU Quito | Quito |
| Manta | Manta |
| Técnico Universitario | Ambato |
| Universidad Católica | Quito |

== First stage ==
| Pos | Team | Pld | W | D | L | GF | GA | GD | Pts | Qualification or relegation |
|---|---|---|---|---|---|---|---|---|---|---|
| 1 | Deportivo Cuenca | 18 | 10 | 3 | 5 | 26 | 18 | +8 | 23 | Qualified to the Liguilla Final |
| 2 | LDU Quito | 18 | 8 | 5 | 5 | 21 | 20 | +1 | 21 | Qualified to the Liguilla Final |
| 3 | Universidad Católica | 18 | 9 | 2 | 7 | 27 | 21 | +6 | 20 | Qualified to the Liguilla Final |
| 4 | Deportivo Quito | 18 | 6 | 8 | 4 | 25 | 24 | +1 | 20 | |
| 5 | Emelec | 18 | 9 | 1 | 8 | 30 | 24 | +6 | 19 | |
| 6 | Técnico Universitario | 18 | 7 | 5 | 6 | 28 | 23 | +5 | 19 | |
| 7 | Barcelona | 18 | 5 | 6 | 7 | 22 | 24 | −2 | 16 | |
| 8 | América de Quito | 18 | 4 | 7 | 7 | 21 | 24 | −3 | 15 | |
| 9 | El Nacional | 18 | 6 | 3 | 9 | 22 | 31 | −9 | 15 | Relegated to the Serie B |
| 10 | Bonita Banana | 18 | 4 | 4 | 10 | 9 | 22 | −13 | 12 | Relegated to the Serie B |

Source: RSSSF - 1979 Serie A

== Second stage ==
| Pos | Team | Pld | W | D | L | GF | GA | GD | Pts | Qualification or relegation |
|---|---|---|---|---|---|---|---|---|---|---|
| 1 | Emelec | 18 | 10 | 5 | 3 | 32 | 16 | +16 | 25 | Qualified to the Liguilla Final |
| 2 | Técnico Universitario | 18 | 7 | 7 | 4 | 25 | 18 | +7 | 21 | Qualified to the Liguilla Final |
| 3 | Manta | 18 | 7 | 6 | 5 | 20 | 21 | −1 | 20 | Qualified to the Liguilla Final |
| 4 | América de Quito | 18 | 7 | 5 | 6 | 23 | 19 | +4 | 19 | |
| 5 | Barcelona | 18 | 8 | 3 | 7 | 27 | 24 | +3 | 19 | |
| 6 | Universidad Católica | 18 | 6 | 6 | 6 | 26 | 25 | +1 | 18 | |
| 7 | Deportivo Cuenca | 18 | 5 | 7 | 6 | 18 | 19 | −1 | 17 | |
| 8 | LDU Quito | 18 | 7 | 3 | 8 | 15 | 21 | −6 | 17 | |
| 9 | Aucas | 18 | 5 | 5 | 8 | 19 | 29 | −10 | 15 | Relegated to the Serie B |
| 10 | Deportivo Quito | 18 | 2 | 5 | 11 | 20 | 33 | −13 | 9 | Relegated to the Serie B |

Source: RSSSF - 1979 Serie A

== Liguilla Final ==
| Pos | Team | Pld | W | D | L | GF | GA | GD | Pts | Qualification |
|---|---|---|---|---|---|---|---|---|---|---|
| 1 | Emelec (Note: Emelec were awarded three points.) (C) | 10 | 5 | 4 | 1 | 16 | 10 | +6 | 17 | 1980 Copa Libertadores |
| 2 | Universidad Católica (Note: Universidad Católica were awarded one point.) | 10 | 7 | 1 | 2 | 12 | 6 | +6 | 16 | 1980 Copa Libertadores |
| 3 | Manta (Note: Manta were awarded one point.) | 10 | 3 | 4 | 3 | 11 | 8 | +3 | 11 | |
| 4 | Técnico Universitario (Note: Técnico Universitario were awarded two points.) | 10 | 3 | 2 | 5 | 13 | 16 | −3 | 10 | |
| 5 | LDU Quito (Note: LDU Quito were awarded two points.) | 10 | 3 | 2 | 5 | 13 | 17 | −4 | 10 | |
| 6 | Deportivo Cuenca (Note: Deportivo Cuenca were awarded three points.) | 10 | 1 | 3 | 6 | 8 | 16 | −8 | 8 | |

Source: RSSSF - 1979 Serie A
(C) Champions
Notes:

Campeonato Ecuatoriano de Fútbol
1979 champion
