= Horacio Simaldone =

Argentine footballer

Horacio Pedro Simaldone Alarcón (born 7 August 1958) is an Argentine former professional footballer who played as a forward for clubs of Argentina and Chile.

== Teams ==
- San Lorenzo 1977–1978
- Unión Española 1979–1982
- Colo-Colo 1983–1985
- O'Higgins 1986–1987
- San Marcos de Arica 1988
- Everton 1989–1993

== Honours ==
Colo-Colo

- Chilean Championship: 1983
- Copa Polla Gol: 1985
