= Cristián Castañeda =

Chilean footballer (born 1968)

Personal information
- Full name: Cristián Alberto Castañeda Vargas
- Date of birth: 18 September 1968 (age 58)
- Place of birth: San Vicente de Tagua Tagua, Chile
- Height: 1.75 m (5 ft 9 in)
- Position: Right back

Senior career*
Years	Team	Apps	(Gls)
1989	General Velásquez		
1990–1992	Palestino	6	(0)
1993–2002	Universidad de Chile	136	(0)
2003–2004	Everton	27	(0)
2005	Deportes Arica	13	(0)
Total		172	(0)

International career
1994–1998	Chile	24	(1)

Managerial career
- Palestino (assistant)
- Deportes La Serena (assistant)
- 2011: Deportes Copiapó
- 2011–2012: Curicó Unido (assistant)
- 2012: Curicó Unido (caretaker)
- 2016: Universidad de Chile (assistant)
- * Club domestic league appearances and goals

Cristián Alberto Castañeda Vargas (born 18 September 1968) is a retired Chilean football player. He played for a few clubs, including Universidad de Chile and Everton Viña del Mar, his last club was Deportes Arica.

Nicknamed "Scooby" Castañeda played for the Chile national football team and was a participant at the 1998 FIFA World Cup. He was capped 25 times scoring 1 goal between 1994 and 1998, and made his debut on 1994-03-26.

== Personal life ==
He belongs to a football family since his father, Hugo, and his uncles Víctor, Rolando and Gerardo, were professional footballers. He also played alongside his older brother, Víctor Hugo, for Palestino, Universidad de Chile and the Chile national team. In addition, his cousins Marco and Roly were with the Palestino youth ranks, as well as his uncle Manuel, who was with the reserve team.

== Honours ==
=== Club ===
Universidad de Chile

- Primera División de Chile (4): 1994, 1995, 1999, 2000
- Copa Chile (2): 1998, 2000

Everton

- Primera B (1): 2003
