= Arturo Salah =

Chilean former footballer and manager (born 1949)

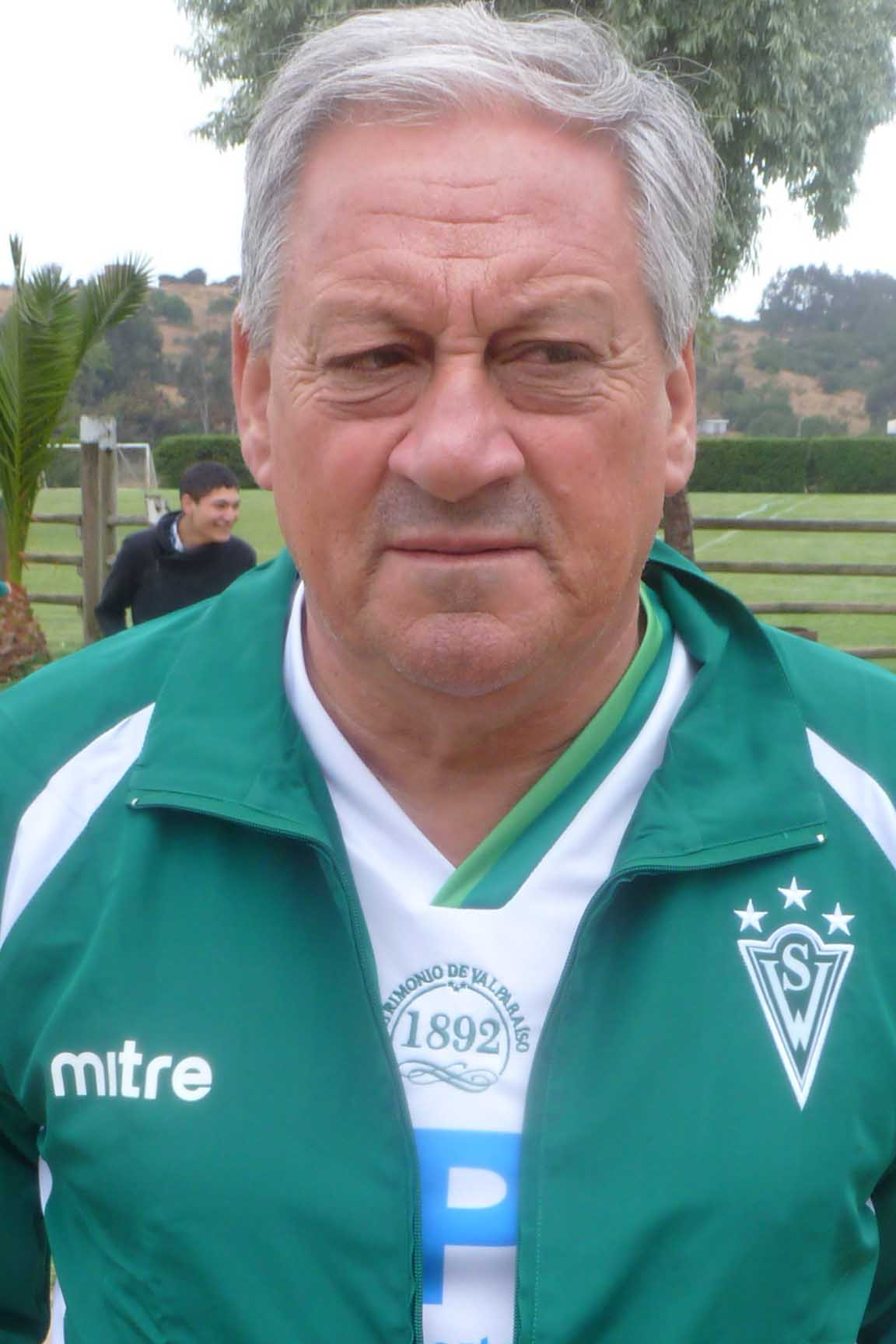

Personal information
- Full name: Arturo Salah Cassani
- Date of birth: 4 December 1949 (age 76)
- Place of birth: Santiago, Chile
- Height: 1.83 m (6 ft 0 in)
- Position: Defender

Youth career
- Audax Italiano

Senior career*
| Years | Team | Apps | (Gls) |
| 1969–1971 | Audax Italiano | | |
| 1972–1974 | Universidad Católica | | |
| 1975–1981 | Universidad de Chile | | |
| 1982–1983 | Palestino | | |

Managerial career
- 1986–1990: Colo-Colo
- 1990–1993: Chile
- 1992: Chile U23
- 1992–1994: Universidad de Chile
- 1994–1996: Monterrey
- 1999–2000: Cobreloa
- 2004–2007: Huachipato
- 2007–2008: Universidad de Chile
- 2010–2011: Huachipato
- 2012: Santiago Wanderers
- * Club domestic league appearances and goals

Arturo Salah Cassani (born 4 December 1949) is a former Chilean footballer and manager. From January 2016 until 2019 he was the president of Asociación Nacional de Fútbol Profesional.

He studied civil engineering at the Pontifical Catholic University of Chile.

== Manager career ==
He began his managerial career with Colo-Colo. He won two national championships (1986 & 1989), finished runner-up twice (1987 & 1988), and won the Copa Chile three times with Colo-Colo. After that run with Colo-Colo, Salah took charge of the Chile national team from 1990 to 1993. In 1991, he led "La Roja" to a third place in the Copa America. He stayed in charge of "La Roja" for thirty games, of which he won twelve, tied seven, and lost eleven.

After that he was hired as the coach of Universidad de Chile. His first stint with the team lasted one year before he moved to coach Monterrey.

In 2001, Salah was hired as National Director of Chiledeportes, turning back to coaching in 2003. In Huachipato Salah raised the team's level of play and reached the 2006 Copa Sudamerica, being eliminated by Colo-Colo. He stayed with the team until 2007 when Universidad de Chile hired him.

In his career, he has coached 421 games, won 209, tied 124, and lost 88.

== Honours ==
=== Player ===
Universidad de Chile

- Copa Chile: 1979

=== Manager ===
Colo-Colo

- Primera División de Chile (2): 1986, 1989
- Copa Chile (3): 1988, 1989, 1990
