= Atilio Herrera =

Argentine-Chilean footballer (born 1951)

Personal information
- Full name: Atilio Raúl Herrera
- Date of birth: 21 January 1951 (age 74)
- Place of birth: Argentina
- Position: Defender

Senior career*
| Years | Team | Apps | (Gls) |
| 1971–1972 | River Plate | | |
| 1973 | Estudiantes (BA) | | |
| 1974–1975 | Huracán | | |
| 1976–1980 | Colo-Colo | | |
| 1981 | Palestino | | |
| 1982 | Deportes Iquique | | |
| 1983–1986 | Rangers | | |
| 1987 | Palestino | | |
| 1988–1990 | San Miguel | | |
| 1991 | Magallanes | | |
- * Club domestic league appearances and goals

Atilio Raúl Herrera (born January 21, 1951) is an Argentine-Chilean former professional footballer who played as a defender for clubs of Argentina and Chile.

== Teams ==
- (Argentina) River Plate 1971–1972
- (Argentina) Estudiantes de Buenos Aires 1973
- (Argentina) Huracán 1974–1975
- (Chile) Colo-Colo 1976–1980
- (Chile) Palestino 1981
- (Chile) Deportes Iquique 1982
- (Chile) Rangers 1983–1986
- (Chile) Palestino 1987
- (Argentina) San Miguel 1988–1990
- (Chile) Magallanes 1991

== Honours ==
Colo-Colo

- Chilean Primera División: 1979
