= 1940 Campeonato Nacional Primera División =

Chilean football league season

Campeonato Nacional de Fútbol Profesional
- Dates: 12 May 1940 – 8 December 1940
- Champions: Universidad de Chile (1st title)
- Matches: 90
- Goals: 417 (4.63 per match)
- Top goalscorer: Víctor Alonso; Pedro Valenzuela (20 goals)
- Total attendance: 297,874
- Average attendance: 3,310

The 1940 Campeonato Nacional de Fútbol Profesional was Chilean first tier’s 8th season. Universidad de Chile was the tournament’s champion, being this title its first ever professional honor.

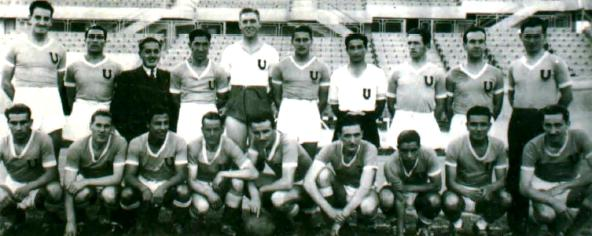
Universidad de Chile's 1940 champion team

== Scores ==
	AUD	BAD	COL	GCR	MAG	SMO	SNJ	UES	UCA	UCH
Audax		3–1	2–5	3–1	2–3	4–1	1–2	3–1	5–1	1–3
Bádminton	4–4		2–5	3–3	4–2	5–2	1–1	1–2	2–2	1–3
Colo-Colo	3–5	3–1		2–5	0–2	2–2	3–0	2–0	2–3	1–0
Green Cross	2–4	1–3	2–1		5–1	2–5	3–1	2–2	2–2	1–2
Magallanes	1–2	5–1	4–6	4–1		5–2	2–4	2–1	2–1	4–4
S. Morning	1–1	3–5	1–3	5–1	4–2		3–1	2–1	0–1	2–4
S. National J.	2–2	3–1	2–1	2–2	4–1	3–3		2–1	3–2	2–2
U. Española	2–5	2–2	2–3	3–6	2–0	3–4	1–1		3–2	1–2
U. Católica	2–4	1–1	3–0	3–4	1–4	2–1	1–3	2–2		2–3
U. de Chile	3–0	2–0	1–3	3–4	5–3	3–2	2–0	2–1	2–3	

== Schedule ==
Pos	Team	Pld	W	D	L	GF	GA	GD	Pts
1	Universidad de Chile (C)	18	12	2	4	46	31	+15	26
2	Audax Italiano	18	10	3	5	51	38	+13	23
3	Santiago National Juventus	18	8	6	4	36	32	+4	22
4	Colo-Colo	18	10	1	7	45	37	+8	21
5	Green Cross	18	7	4	7	47	49	−2	18
6	Magallanes	18	8	1	9	47	49	−2	17
7	Santiago Morning	18	6	3	9	43	48	−5	15
8	Badminton	18	4	6	8	38	47	−9	14
9	Universidad Católica	18	5	4	9	34	43	−9	14
10	Unión Española	18	3	4	11	30	43	−13	10

(C) Champions

Campeonato Profesional
1940 champions
Universidad de Chile
1st title

== Topscorers ==
Name	Team	Goals
(Chile) Pedro Valenzuela	Magallanes	20
(Chile) Víctor Alonso	Universidad de Chile	20
