= Héctor Hoffens =

Chilean footballer (born 1957)

Personal information
- Full name: Héctor Antonio Hoffens Valenzuela
- Date of birth: 3 January 1957 (age 69)
- Place of birth: Santiago, Chile
- Position: Forward

Youth career
- Universidad de Chile

Senior career*
Years	Team	Apps	(Gls)
1974–1983	Universidad de Chile	201	(34)
1977	→ Ferroviarios (loan)	34	(3)
1984–1985	Audax Italiano	57	(7)
1986–1990	Universidad de Chile	129	(10)
Total		421	(54)
- * Club domestic league appearances and goals

Héctor Antonio Hoffens Valenzuela (born 3 January 1957) is a Chilean former footballer who played as a forward.

== Career ==
A historical player of Universidad de Chile, Hoffens was one of the mainstays players in the 1989 season, when the club returned to the Primera División, alongside teammamtes such as Eduardo Fournier, Marco Fajre, Horacio Rivas, among others.

== Honours ==
Universidad de Chile

- Copa Chile: 1979
- Segunda División: 1989

Individual

- Chilean Footballer of the Year: 1989
