= Luis Alberto Ramos =

Argentine footballer

Personal information
- Full name: Luis Alberto Ramos Carobene
- Date of birth: 2 October 1953 (age 73)
- Place of birth: Mendoza, Argentina
- Height: 1.75 m (5 ft 9 in)
- Position: Forward

Youth career
- 1966–1970: Huracán Las Heras

Senior career*
Years	Team	Apps	(Gls)
1970	Huracán Las Heras	–	(–)
1970–1974	Rosario Puerto Belgrano	–	(–)
1975–1976	Atlanta	70	(24)
1977	Universidad de Chile	0	(0)
1977	Colo-Colo	21	(2)
1978	Green Cross-Temuco	34	(25)
1979–1980	Universidad de Chile	49	(24)
1981	Elche	4	(1)
1981–1982	Regional Atacama	14	(3)
1983–1984	Everton	44	(19)
1985	Rangers	28	(8)
1987	Universidad de Chile	3	(0)
1987	Unión Española	10	(0)
Total		277	(106)

Managerial career
- 1996–1999: Hosanna
- 2000–2003: Cristo Salva
- * Club domestic league appearances and goals

Luis Alberto Ramos Carobene (born October 2, 1953, in Mendoza, Argentina) is a former Argentine footballer who played for clubs of Argentina and Chile.

== Playing career ==
Born in Mendoza, Argentina, Ramos began his career playing five-a-side football in his city of birth. Later, he joined the local team, Huracán Las Heras.

Before playing for Rosario Puerto Belgrano, he represented the Argentine Navy team and the Bahía Blanca city team.

In 1976, Atlanta transferred Ramos to Universidad de Chile, but he switched to Colo-Colo, the classic rival, in the same stint.

In 1981, he signed with Spanish club Elche, but after an accident in the Andes where his parents, sister and an aunt died, he returned to Argentina and subsequently he signed with Regional Atacama in Chile.

=== Teams ===
- Huracán Las Heras 1966-1970
- Rosario Puerto Belgrano 1970-1974
- Atlanta 1975–1976
- Universidad de Chile 1976
- Colo-Colo 1977
- Green Cross-Temuco 1978
- Universidad de Chile 1979-1980
- Elche 1981
- Regional Atacama 1981-1982
- Everton 1983-1984
- Rangers 1985
- Universidad de Chile 1987
- Unión Española 1987

== Managerial career ==
Ramos led Hosanna, a club made up by evangelical players, in both the Cuarta and the Tercera División. In 2000, he founded club Cristo Salva Cristo Viene, known as Cristo Salva, also made up by evangelical players, becoming classic rivals in the same divisions.

== Personal life ==
Ramos is a Protestant.

He is nicknamed La Fiera (The Beast).

== Titles ==
- Universidad de Chile 1979 (Copa Chile)

== Honours ==
- Universidad de Chile 1979 (Top Scorer Copa Chile)
