= Club Universidad de Chile =

Association football club in Chile

Universidad de Chile
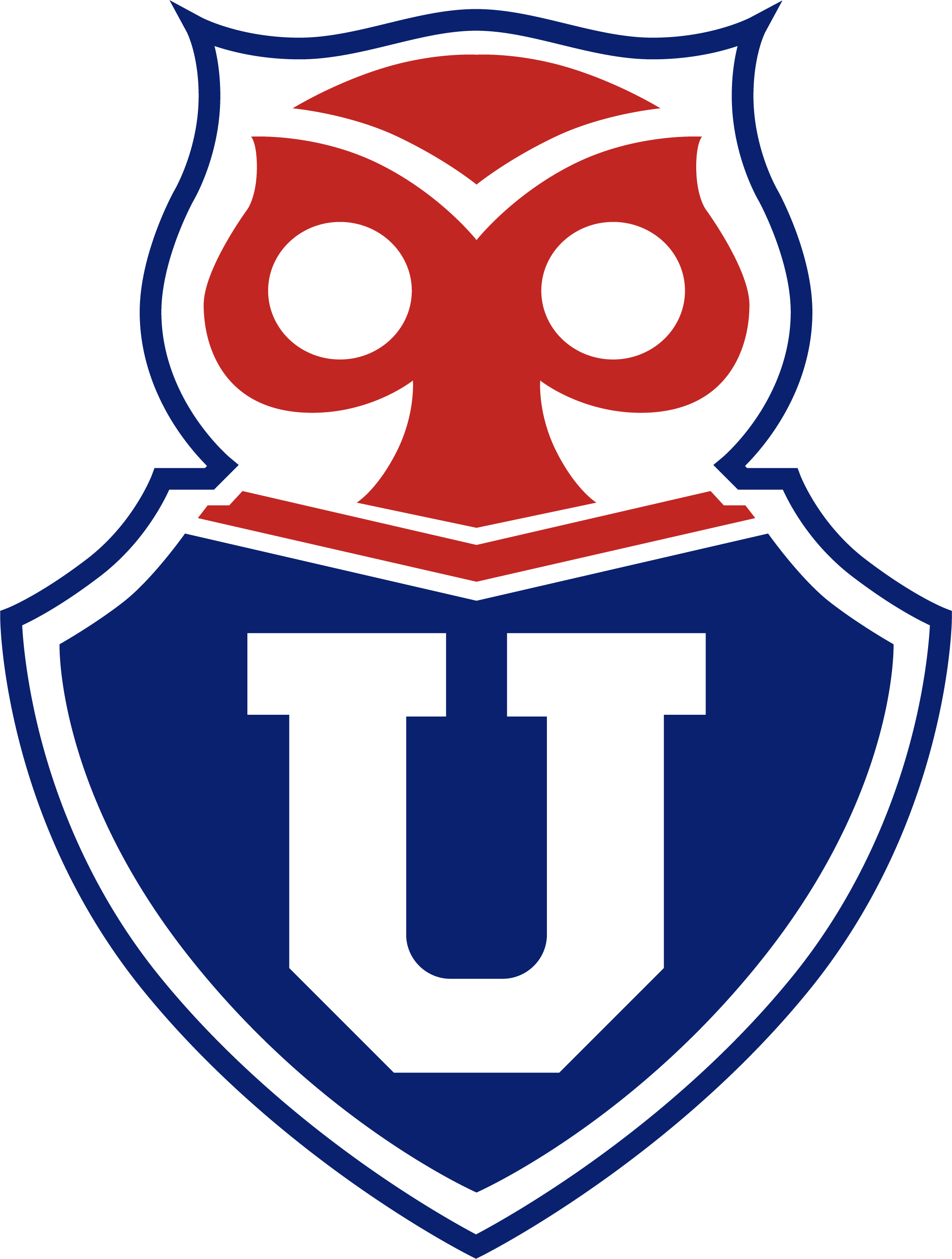
- Full name: Club Universidad de Chile
- Nicknames: Los Azules (The Blues); La U (The U); El Romántico Viajero (Wanderlust); El Bulla (The Noise); El Chuncho (The Owl); León (Lion); La Chile (The Chile); Ballet Azul (Blue Ballet)
- Founded: May 24, 1927; 99 years ago
- Ground: Estadio Nacional Julio Martínez Prádanos
- Capacity: 48,665
- Chairman: Eduardo Álamos
- Manager: Fernando Gago
- League: Liga de Primera
- 2025: Liga de Primera, 4th of 16
- Website: www.udechile.cl
Home colours	Away colours	Third colours

Club Universidad de Chile (Spanish pronunciation: [kluβ uniβeɾsiˈðað ðe ˈtʃile]) is a professional football club based in Santiago, Chile, that plays in the Primera División.

Founded on 24 May 1927, Universidad de Chile is one of the most successful and popular football clubs in Chile, having won the league title 18 times. In the last 10 years, the team has been crowned champion six times, including their undefeated run to the 2011 Copa Sudamericana title. The team has been associated with the colour blue throughout its history, blue is present on the logo, which was officially adopted in 1943. The club rivalries are with Colo-Colo and Universidad Católica, with whom they regularly contest the Santiago derbies known as Superclásicos.

Despite not owning its stadium, the club usually rents and plays its home games at the Estadio Nacional Julio Martínez Prádanos, in the commune of Ñuñoa in Santiago.

Universidad de Chile was the champion of the Copa Sudamericana 2011. In this tournament, the club had an excellent performance: wasn't defeated, won all their matches in Chile and had the top scorer of the tournament's history (Eduardo Vargas). Universidad de Chile has reached semi-finals in the Copa Libertadores four times (years 1970, 1996, 2010 and 2012).

== History ==
Universidad de Chile Supporters
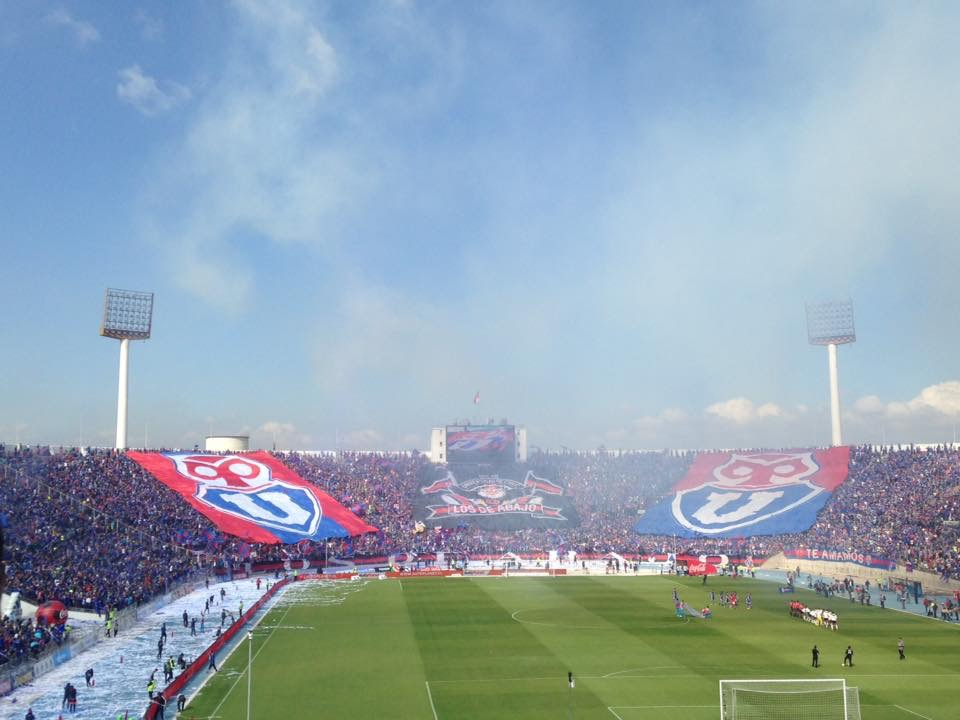
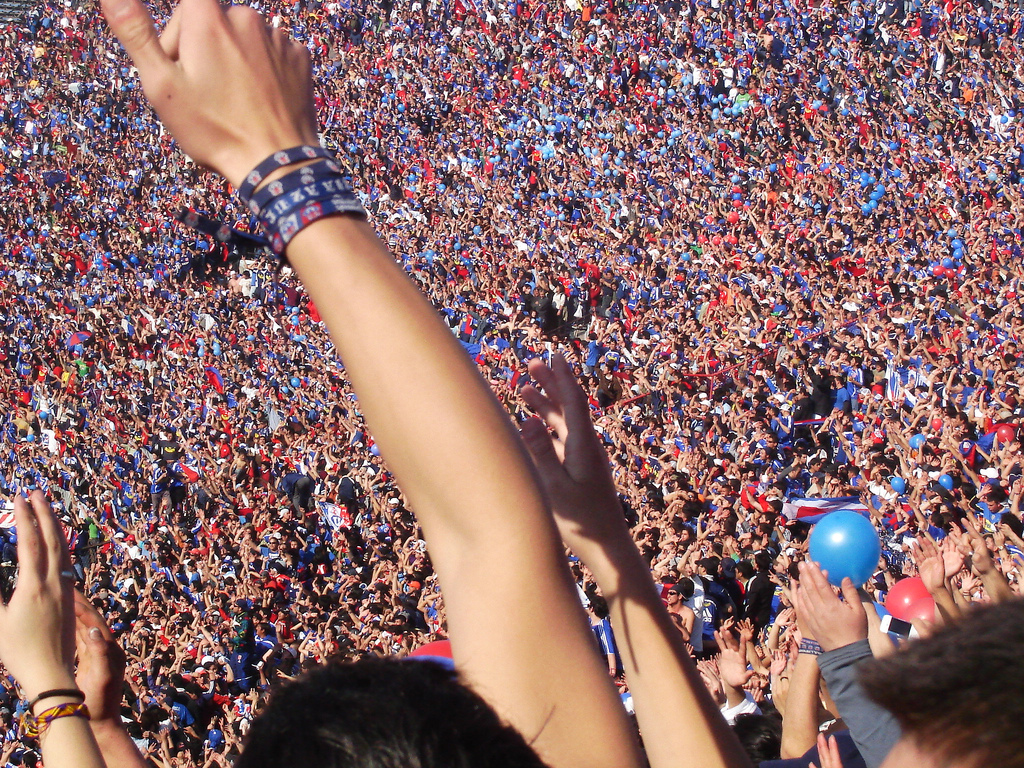
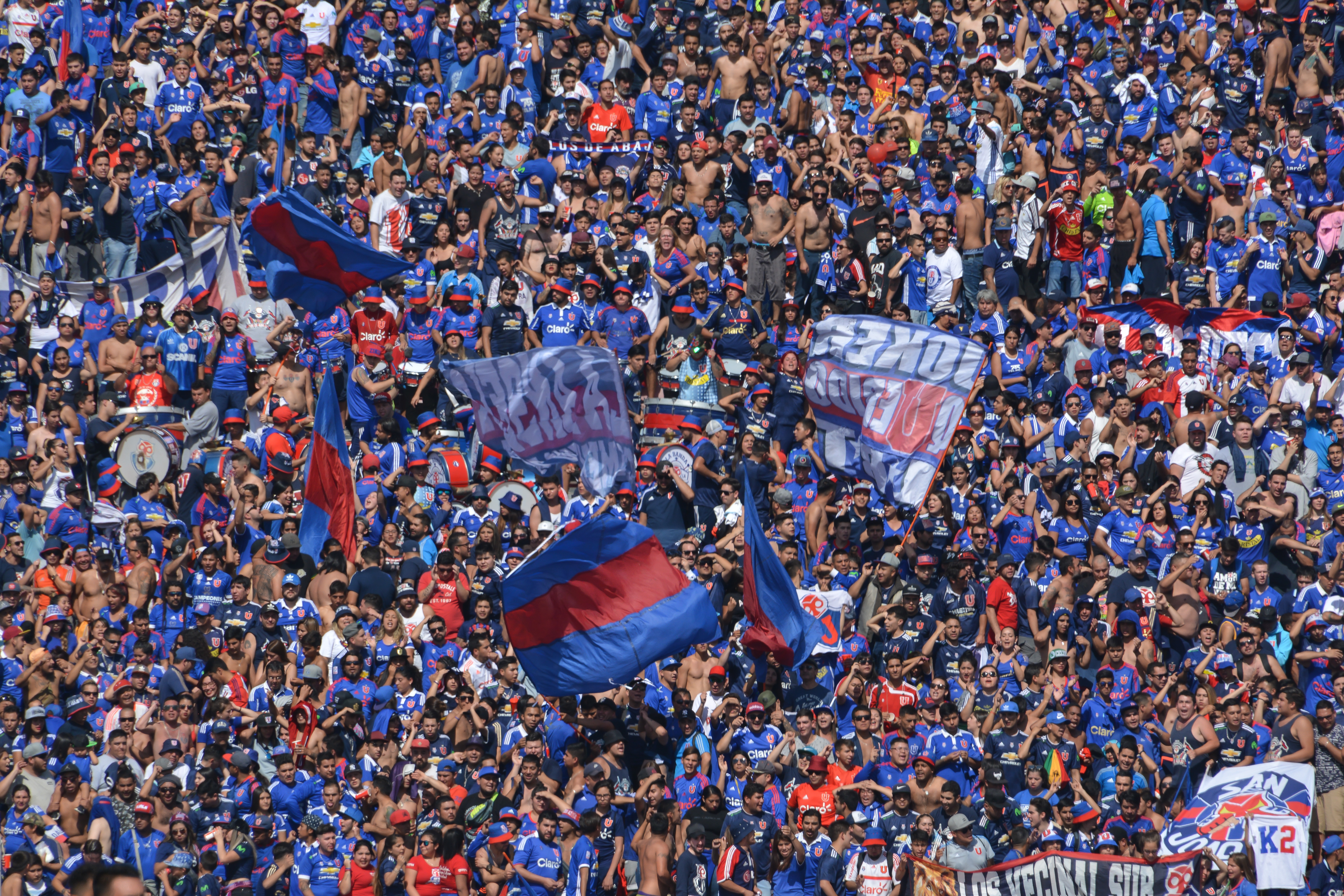
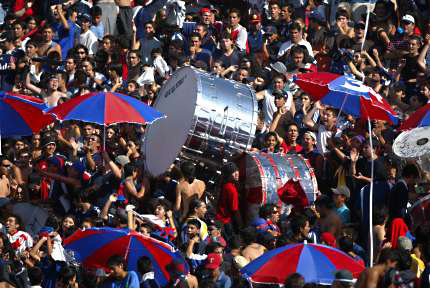
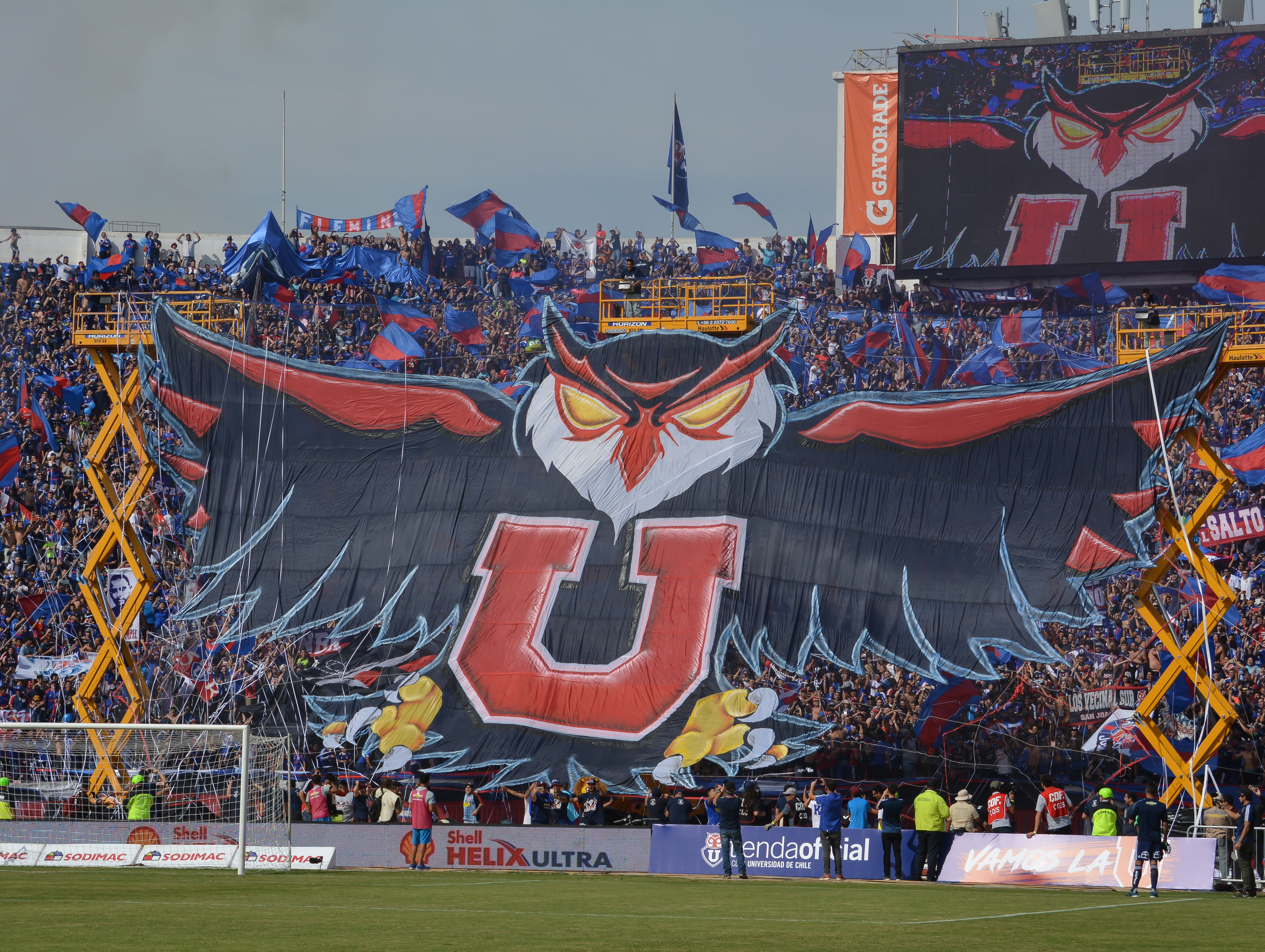

The club was founded on 24 May 1927, as Club Deportivo Universitario by the merger of Internado FC and Club Universitario de Deportes. Initially, the club was formed by students of the Universidad de Chile and was the sport brand of the university until 1980 when the university's rector and president of the club at the time (both of them appointed by the Pinochet dictatorship) decided to separate the club from the university and created the CORFUCH to manage the football team. This move was a part of the atomization of the Universidad de Chile made by the military dictatorship to strengthen the private universities that were founded during that time and also to reduce state power. This was seen as a major blow to the club, as it was left with nothing but a loyal fan base. From then on, the club started to decline in terms of results on the field and lack of support from various sectors of the economy when other major clubs in Chile were helped by main powers such as the government, the catholic church, and Codelco. Eventually, the team's poor performances led to a relegation to second division in 1988, and threats to dissolve the club were made by the university if the team did not manage to return to the first division within a year. In 1989, Universidad de Chile were able to earn the 2nd division's championship, thus bringing them back to the first division, where they have remained since then.

=== Bankruptcy and Azul Azul ===
In 2006, the club declared bankruptcy and received an imposed administration that was criticized by the supporters, as the new chairman immediately fired many club workers and tried to transform the club into a private company of public stocks, being opposed to the decision of the club members in a previous assembly. The team finished the year with the worst campaign in the club history and the almost-sure transformation into private company due to the ties between the appointed chairman and several businessmen.

During 2007, the imposed administration gave the club into concession to a private group (Azul Azul). In 2008, the new university's rector agreed to enter a contract with the now private club, in which he allowed the use of the university's name and symbols in exchange for a royalty and the right to appoint two out of the eleven directors of the board.

== Colours and logo ==
=== Home kit and away kit ===
The team's home kit from 1943 to 1958 consisted of a blue jersey, a white short and blue socks. In 1959, the home kit was changed to an all royal blue kit. In 1992 a darker tone of blue was used for the home kit and in 1996 a red stripe was added to the sleeves. The team's home kit saw its most drastic change in 2001–02 when red sleeves were included on the jersey; this kit retained the blue shorts and blue socks. In 2006, the team returned to the 1959 variation of its uniform and has not changed it since then. The current home kit features the classic red letter U on the front of the jersey.

From 1934 until 2001–02, Universidad de Chile's away kit consisted of a white jersey, shorts and socks, occasionally using blue shorts during the 1990s. In 2001–02, for the first time in the club's history a red kit was introduced; this kit consisted of a red jersey with dark blue sleeves, red shorts and red socks. In 2005, the club introduced a new all-red away kit, thereby dropping the blue sleeves in favor of red ones. The current away kit in a similar fashion to the home kit also features the red letter U on the front of the jersey. Universidad de Chile wore a kit that featured the regular royal blue jersey, white shorts and royal blue socks for a game against Chivas during the 2010 Copa Libertadores. At the end of 2010 the historical all-white combination made a return as the club's alternate kit.

=== Shirt sponsors and manufacturers ===
Period	Kit Manufacturer	Shirt Sponsor
1974–78	New Leader	—
1979	Haddad	—
1980–85	Adidas	—
1986	Ñandu	—
1987	Umbro	—
1988–89	Adidas	—
1990	Adidas	Scania
1991	Pony International	Fiat
1991	Pony International	Chilectra
1992–95	Avia	Chilectra
1996	Diadora	Chilectra
1997–98	Reebok	Chilectra
1998	Reebok	—
1998	Reebok	AdeS
1999–00	Adidas	AdeS
2001–03	Adidas	LG
2004–07	Adidas	Cristal (Beer)
2008–10	Adidas	Telmex
2010–16	Adidas	Claro/Tramontina
2017–2018	Adidas	Chevrolet/Movistar/Loto
2019	Adidas	Petrobras/Movistar
2020–2021	Adidas	Petrobras/Directv
2022	Adidas	Betano/DirecTV

=== The chuncho logo ===
The team's logo, a red and white chuncho (Austral pygmy owl), has its origins in the days of the Club Náutico Universitario which gave its emblem to the Club Universitario de Deportes (CUD), when was founded in 1927. The logo was taken from Germany by Pablo Ramírez Rodríguez, who turned into a Minister of Exchequer in 1945. The chuncho was chosen for its association with wisdom, mutual knowledge, harmony of the body and soul.

The team's logo is not usually found on the team's uniform, being favored in turn by a red letter U with a white trim. The chuncho logo was absent from the team's jersey starting in 1979, but made a return during the 1996–97 season. Since 2006–07, a small chuncho logo could be found on the jersey along with the red U.

== Achievements ==
2011 Copa Sudamericana
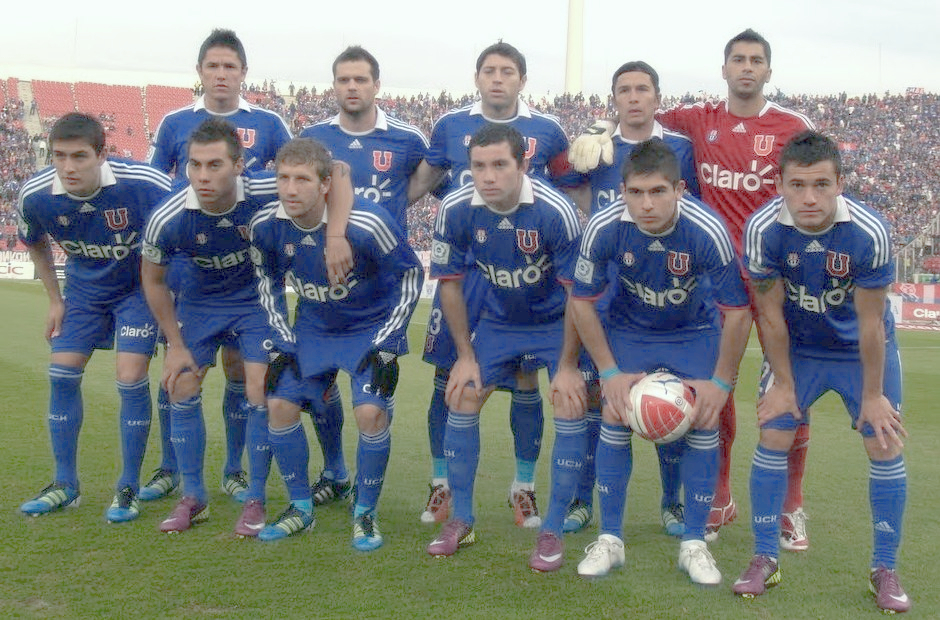
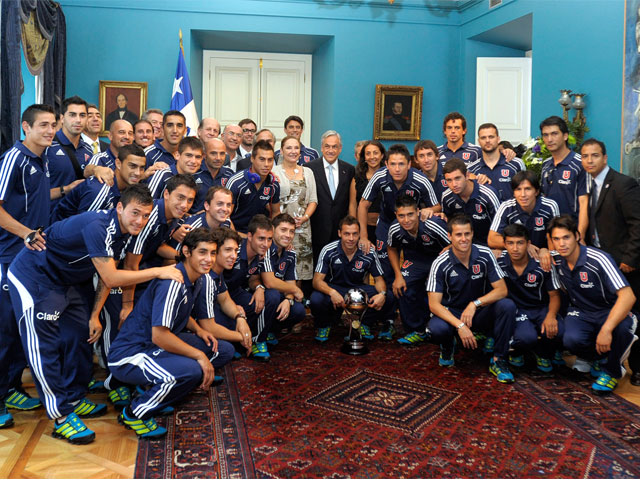
In 2011, the team managed to win the Copa Sudamericana unbeaten, the club's first international trophy.

Universidad de Chile's first title was won in 1940, just 3 years after their professional debut. The team won six titles (1959, 1962, 1964, 1965, 1967, 1969) between 1959 and 1969 and they became known as the Blue Ballet in reference the beautiful style of football they played. Nine members of that squad were part of the Chilean national team that reached 3rd place in the 1962 FIFA World Cup, the best result ever achieved by Chile in a World Cup.

In 1995, Universidad de Chile won the cup once more, this time at home in front of almost 78,000 people in the Estadio Nacional. The team would then win back-to-back titles in 1999 and 2000.

More recently Universidad de Chile has won the Apertura in 2004, 2009, 2011 and 2014/2015, and Clausura in 2011 and 2016/2017. The 2011, the title was won at the hands of defending champions Universidad Católica, by a global score of 4–3, having lost the first leg of the final 2–0 and needing to win by a 3-goal margin, the team managed to win the second leg by a 4–1 score.

On the international stage Universidad de Chile have had a few of good runs in Copa Libertadores, reaching the semi-finals in 1970, 1996, 2010, and 2012.

Starting lineup that contested and won the 2011 Copa Sudamericana final (undefeated champions).

On 14 December 2011, they defeated Liga de Quito from Ecuador 3–0 (4–0 on aggregate) to win the Copa Sudamericana, becoming the third Chilean team to win a South American tournament, behind Colo-Colo's 1991 Copa Libertadores and Universidad Catolica's 1994 Copa Interamericana. In the tournament, the club had an excellent performance (undefeated, and winning all their matches in Chile), and was nicknamed the "South America's FC Barcelona".

Also, the team was named the most successful Chilean club of the 2010s, by winning a total of 9 titles in the whole decade. The achievement included 5 Primera División titles (2011 Apertura, 2011 Clausura, 2012 Apertura, 2014 Apertura and 2017 Clausura), 2 Copa Chile titles (2012–13 and 2015), the 2015 Supercopa and the 2011 Copa Sudamericana. Universidad de Chile also went on to win the 2024 Copa Chile and the 2025 Supercopa de Chile.

== Records ==
- Record Primera División victory — 9–1 v. Magallanes (1962)
- Record Primera División defeat — 0–6 v. Colo-Colo (1938)
- Record Copa Chile victory — 10-0 v. Chimbarongo FC (2023)
- Most goals scored in Primera División — 184 Carlos Campos (1956–69)
- Most Primera División appearances — 386 Leonel Sánchez (1953–69)
- Most appearances overall — 539 Luis Musrri (1988–04)
- Record Unbeaten Matches in Primera Division (National Record) — 33 (1999)
- Record Straight Wins in Primera Division (National Record) — 16 (1963–64)
- Record Best Start in Primera Division (National Record) 9 straight wins (2011)
- Highest attendance in Primera Division (National Record) — 85,268 v. Universidad Catolica (29 December 1962)

== Honours ==
Club Universidad de Chile honours
Type	Competition	Titles	Seasons
National	Primera División	18	1940, 1959, 1962, 1964, 1965, 1967, 1969, 1994, 1995, 1999, 2000, 2004-A, 2009-A, 2011-A, 2011-C, 2012-A, 2014-A, 2017-C
National	Segunda División	1	1989
National	Copa Chile	6	1979, 1998, 2000, 2012–13, 2015, 2024
National	Supercopa de Chile	2	2015, 2025
National	Copa Francisco Candelori	1^{S}	1969
International	Copa Sudamericana	1	2011

- record
- ^{S} shared record

=== Regional ===
- Copa Unión de la Primera División de la Asociación de Football de Santiago
  - Winners (1): 1923
- Copa Chile de la Primera División de la Asociación de Football de Santiago
  - Winners (3): 1918, 1921, 1923
- Sección Uruguay de la Copa Chile de la Primera División de la Asociación de Football de Santiago
  - Winners (1): 1923
- Serie B de la Copa Unión de la Asociación de Football de Santiago
  - Winners (2): 1916, 1917
- Copa Independencia de la Segunda División de la Asociación de Football de Santiago
  - Winners (2): Serie B 1916, Serie B 1917
- Copa El Diario Ilustrado del Campeonato Atlético de la Asociación de Football de Santiago
  - Winners (1): 1916
- División de Honor de la Sección Amateur de la Asociación de Football de Santiago
  - Winners (1): 1934
- Torneo Metropolitano de Chile
  - Winners (2): 1968, 1969

== Supporters and rivalries ==
Universidad de Chile is the second largest following club in the country, with appromiximately 21% of the total Chilean football fans according to research and surveys from 2018, published in September 2021 by Spanish newspaper agency AS.com.

Created on March 24, 1988 from the split and subsequent re-foundation of the Imperio Azul barra, it occupies the south gallery of the Estadio Nacional where the team plays its home games. Its name is inspired by the initial location (below) of the young members of the former barra. It is considered one of the biggest barras in football, in Chile it is known as "La Número Uno" (Number One), as well as having great recognition in Latin-America. They feud with other barra brava groups, most notably Garra Blanca of Colo-Colo and Los Cruzados of Universidad Católica.

=== Chilean Superclásico ===
Universidad de Chile's traditional rival is Colo-Colo, against which it plays the so-called Chilean Classic or Chilean Superclásico. Although the first confrontation between the two clubs dates back to 1935, the rivalry began to develop in the 1940s and 1950s, with the match played on 11 November 1959 being the climax of a series of disagreements between the two institutions. That match, valid for the definition of that year's title, ended with a 2-1 victory for Universidad de Chile, which was the first of a series of good results for the "Azules" over Colo-Colo. This, added to the dominance of Universidad de Chile in the national championship, only increased the rivalry. In recent years the rivalry between these teams has diminished, leaving Colo-Colo as superior to Universidad de Chile, and because of that, it has been considered as the "most unequal rivalry in the world."

=== Clásico Universitario ===
There is often a rivalry between the two clubs from academic roots, where the game between Universidad de Chile and Universidad Católica is known as "Clásico Universitario". It is the oldest confrontation between two clubs from academic roots, as the first confrontation goes back to the University Classic of 1909. Rivalry, both in sports and in academic issues, made these matches between the universities become more and more important, eventually reaching the national status of "Universities' Derby".

This clásico has been recognized by FIFA as the most traditional of Chile. They met for the first time on 13 June 1937 in matchday three of the first Serie B at the Estadio Militar. These two teams have played 21 head-to-head definitions against each other, Universidad Católica has won 14 and Universidad de Chile 7.

== Players ==
=== Current Squad ===
As of 3 October 2026

Note: Flags indicate national team as defined under FIFA eligibility rules; some limited exceptions apply. Players may hold more than one non-FIFA nationality.

No.	Pos.	Nation	Player
1	GK	CHI	Cristopher Toselli
3	DF	CHI	Igor Lichnovsky
4	DF	CHI	Diego Vargas
5	DF	CHI	Nicolás Ramírez
6	DF	CHI	Nicolás Fernández
7	FW	CHI	Maximiliano Guerrero
8	MF	CHI	Israel Poblete
9	FW	URU	Octavio Rivero
11	FW	CHI	Eduardo Vargas
13	FW	CHI	Jhon Cortés
14	DF	CHI	Marcelo Morales
15	MF	ARG	Tobías Reinhart
16	MF	CHI	Elías Rojas
17	DF	CHI	Fabián Hormazábal

No.	Pos.	Nation	Player
18	FW	ARG	Juan Martín Lucero
19	MF	CHI	Javier Altamirano
20	MF	CHI	Charles Aránguiz (captain)
21	MF	CHI	Marcelo Díaz
22	DF	CHI	Matías Zaldivia
23	FW	CHI	Ignacio Vásquez
25	GK	CHI	Gabriel Castellón
26	MF	CHI	Matías Riquelme
28	MF	CHI	Agustín Arce
29	MF	ARG	Lucas Barrera
31	DF	VEN	Bianneider Tamayo
32	FW	ARG	Gonzalo Reyna (loan from Racing Club)
34	FW	CHI	Vicente Ramírez

=== Youth Academy ===
Note: Flags indicate national team as defined under FIFA eligibility rules; some limited exceptions apply. Players may hold more than one non-FIFA nationality.

No.	Pos.	Nation	Player
12	GK	CHI	José Alburquenque
27	FW	VEN	Andrés Bolaño
33	DF	CHI	Benjamín Garcés
36	DF	CHI	Franco Fernández
38	FW	CHI	Diego Cofré
39	MF	CHI	Benjamín Salas

No.	Pos.	Nation	Player
40	DF	CHI	Claudio Gutiérrez
—	GK	CHI	Matías Oteíza
—	DF	CHI	Agustín Korn
—	DF	CHI	Sergio Rozas
—	MF	CHI	Valentín Montillo
—	FW	CHI	David Guzmán

=== Out on loan ===
Note: Flags indicate national team as defined under FIFA eligibility rules; some limited exceptions apply. Players may hold more than one non-FIFA nationality.

No.	Pos.	Nation	Player
—	GK	CHI	Ignacio Sáez (at Deportes La Serena)
—	DF	PLE	Zacarías Abuhadba (at Deportes Antofagasta)
—	DF	ARG	Franco Calderón (at Independiente)
—	DF	CHI	José Castro (at Huachipato)
—	DF	CHI	Antonio Díaz (at Universidad de Concepción)
—	DF	CHI	Mateo González (at Deportes Concepción)
—	DF	CHI	David Retamal (at Universidad de Concepción)
—	DF	CHI	Yahir Salazar (at Deportes La Serena)
—	DF	CHI	Bastián Tapia (at Deportes Antofagasta)
—	DF	CHI	Cristóbal Ulloa (at Provincial Osorno)
—	DF	CHI	Alonso Villegas (at San Luis)
—	MF	CHI	Franco Cáceres (at Deportes Concepción)
—	MF	CHI	Héctor Canelo (at Provincial Osorno)

No.	Pos.	Nation	Player
—	MF	CHI	Renato Cordero (at Unión Española)
—	MF	CHI	Jeison Fuentealba (at Universidad de Concepción)
—	MF	URU	Gonzalo Montes (at Montevideo City Torque)
—	MF	CHI	Flavio Moya (at Deportes Limache)
—	MF	CHI	Fernando Sanguinetti (at Tepatitlán)
—	MF	CHI	Rubén Vera (at Provincial Osorno)
—	FW	CHI	Julián Alfaro (at Everton)
—	FW	CHI	Benjamín Aravena (at Unión San Felipe)
—	FW	CHI	Benjamín Cortés (at Provincial Osorno)
—	FW	CHI	Martín Espinoza (at Cobresal)
—	FW	CHI	Renato Huerta (at Cobresal)
—	FW	CHI	Salvador Negrete (at Deportes Puerto Montt)

=== 2026 Winter transfers ===
==== In ====
Note: Flags indicate national team as defined under FIFA eligibility rules; some limited exceptions apply. Players may hold more than one non-FIFA nationality.

No.	Pos.	Nation	Player
3	DF	CHI	Igor Lichnovsky (from Fatih Karagümrük)
12	GK	CHI	José Alburquenque (back from Lota Schwager)
15	MF	ARG	Tobías Reinhart (from Reggiana)

No.	Pos.	Nation	Player
32	FW	ARG	Gonzalo Reyna (loan from Racing Club)
38	FW	CHI	Diego Cofré (from Deportes Melipilla)
—	MF	CHI	Valentín Montillo (from Fuenlabrada)

==== Out ====
Note: Flags indicate national team as defined under FIFA eligibility rules; some limited exceptions apply. Players may hold more than one non-FIFA nationality.

No.	Pos.	Nation	Player
2	DF	ARG	Franco Calderón (loan to Independiente)
10	MF	CHI	Lucas Assadi (to AIK)
15	DF	ARG	Felipe Salomoni (back to Guaraní)
24	MF	PAR	Lucas Romero (to Juárez)
30	GK	CHI	Ignacio Sáez (loan to Deportes La Serena)
32	FW	CHI	Martín Espinoza (loan to Cobresal)

No.	Pos.	Nation	Player
37	DF	CHI	Cristóbal Ulloa (loan to Provincial Osorno)
40	FW	CHI	Andrés Torres (to Audax Italiano)
—	DF	PAR	Fernando González (to Cobresal)
—	MF	CHI	Héctor Canelo (loan to Provincial Osorno)
—	MF	CHI	Rubén Vera (loan to Provincial Osorno)

== Player records ==
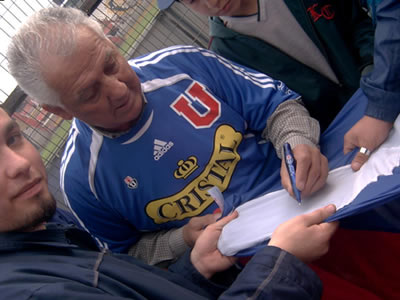
Leonel Sánchez is still popular among the fans.

=== Individual honours ===
==== Primera Division top scorers ====
- (Chile) Víctor Alonso: 20 goals (1940)
- (Uruguay) Ubaldo Cruche: 17 goals (1945), 25 goals (1946)
- (Chile) Carlos Campos: 24 goals (1961), 34 goals (1962), 21 goals (1966)
- (Paraguay) Eladio Zárate: 25 goals (1971)
- (Paraguay) Richart Báez: 10 goals (Clausura 1997)
- (Chile) Pedro González: 23 goals (1998), 26 goals (2000)
- (Chile) Felipe Mora: 13 goals (Clausura 2017)

==== Copa Chile top scorers ====
- (Argentina) Luis Alberto Ramos: 12 goals (1979)
- (Chile) Marcelo Salas: 12 goals (1994)

==== Copa Sudamericana top scorers ====
- (Chile) Eduardo Vargas: 11 goals (2011)

==== Chilean Footballer of the Year ====
- (Chile) Sergio Navarro: 1961
- (Chile) Pedro Araya: 1966
- (Chile) Alberto Quintano: 1967
- (Chile) Adolfo Nef: 1969
- (Chile) Héctor Hoffens: 1989
- (Chile) Patricio Mardones: 1994
- (Chile) Pedro González: 1999
- (Chile) Sergio Vargas: 2000
- (Chile) Eduardo Vargas: 2011
- (Chile) Charles Aránguiz: 2012

==== Primera División Footballer of the Year ====
- (Chile) Juan Rodríguez: 1969
- (Argentina) Cristian Traverso: 1995
- (Chile) Pedro González: 1999
- (Chile) Sergio Vargas: 2000
- (Chile) Miguel Pinto: 2009
- (Chile) Eduardo Vargas: 2011
- (Chile) José Rojas: 2012

==== America's ideal team ====
- (Chile) Marcelo Salas: 1996
- (Chile) Miguel Pinto: 2009
- (Uruguay) Mauricio Victorino: 2010
- (Chile) Eduardo Vargas, Johnny Herrera & Marcos González: 2011
- (Argentina) Matías Rodríguez & (Chile) Charles Aránguiz: 2012

=== Most appearances ===
#	Name	Matches
1	(Chile) Luis Musrri	539
2	(Chile) Johnny Herrera	497
3	(Chile) José Rojas	471
4	(Chile) Vladimir Bigorra	468
5	(Chile) Héctor Hoffens	451
6	(Chile) Manuel Pellegrini	435
7	(Chile) Jorge Socías	429
8	(Chile) Sergio Vargas	428
9	(Chile) Leonel Sánchez	412
10	(Chile) Braulio Musso	390

=== Top scorers ===
#	Name	Goals
1	(Chile) Carlos Campos	199
2	(Chile) Leonel Sánchez	167
3	(Chile) Pedro González	121
4	(Chile) Marcelo Salas	113
5	(Chile) Rubén Marcos	110
6	(Chile) Jorge Socías	102
7	(Argentina) Diego Rivarola	101
8	(Chile) Pedro Araya	90
9	(Chile) Braulio Musso	83
10	(Chile) Ernesto Álvarez	83

== Managers ==
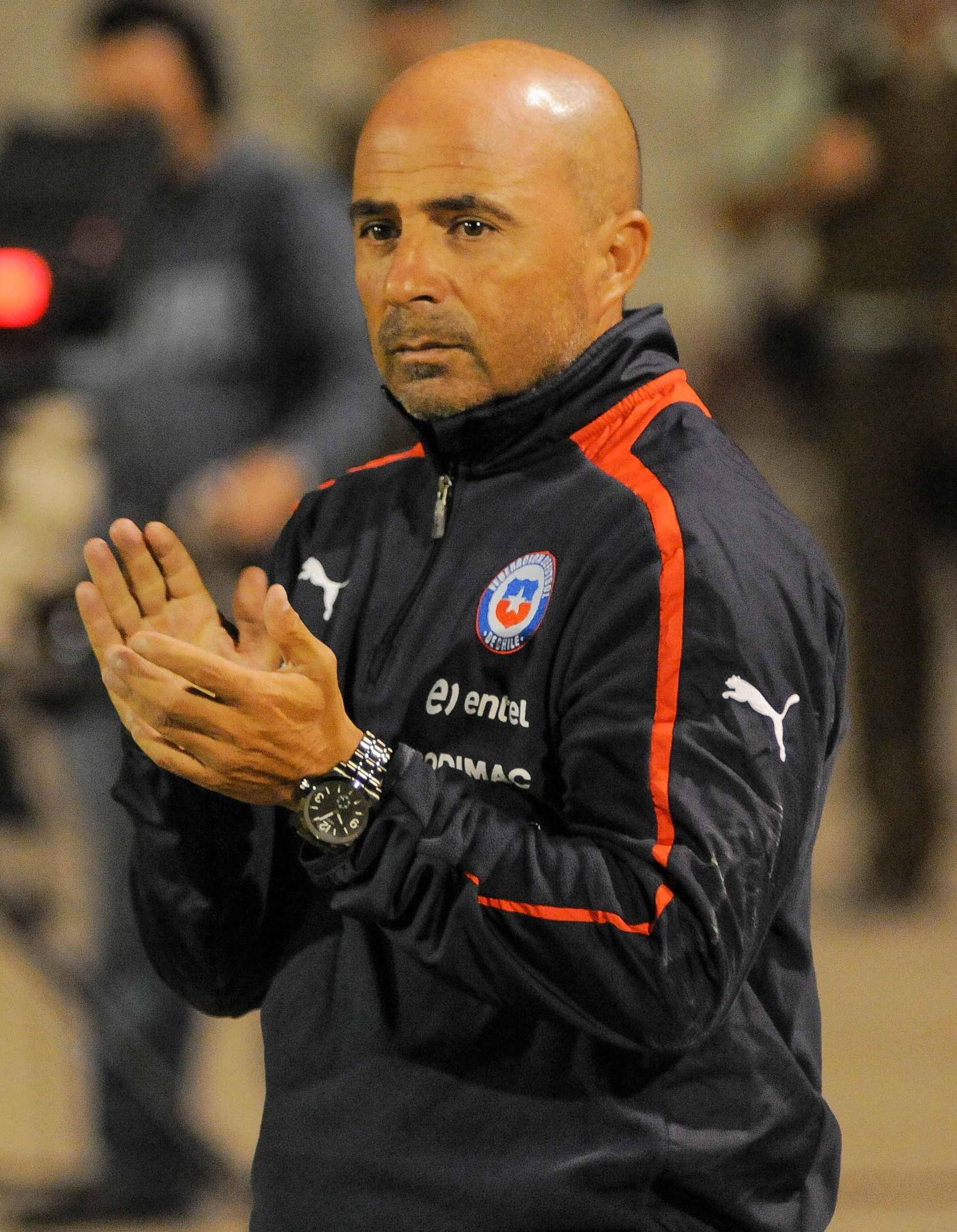
Jorge Sampaoli, the most successful coach in the club’s history. During his two years in charge, he won three consecutive domestic titles and the 2011 Copa Sudamericana.

=== Current coaching staff ===
Position	Name
Manager	(Chile) Gustavo Álvarez
Assistant Manager	(Chile) Nilton Sepúlveda
Fitness Coach	(Chile) Ignacio Fabres
Goalkeeping Coach	(Chile) Carlos Arias

=== List of managers ===
- (Chile) Luis Tirado (1938–1941)
- (Argentina) (Italy) Alejandro Scopelli (1941–1945)
- (Chile) Luis Tirado (1946–1949)
- (Argentina) (Chile) Salvador Nocetti (1950)
- (Argentina) (Italy) Alejandro Scopelli (1950–1952)
- (Chile) Miguel Busquets (1952)
- (Hungary) Jorge Ormos (1953–1954)
- (Chile) Luis Álamos (1954)
- (Chile) Luis Tirado (1955)
- (Chile) Luis Álamos (1956–1966)
- (Chile) Washington Urrutia (1966)
- (Argentina) (Italy) Alejandro Scopelli (1967–1968)
- (Chile) Washington Urrutia (1968)
- (Chile) Ulises Ramos (1969–1974)
- (Chile) Braulio Musso (1974)
- (Chile) Hugo Tassara (1975)
- (Chile) Luis Ibarra (1975–1977)
- (Chile) Nelson Oyarzún (1978)
- (Chile) Ulises Ramos (1978)
- (Chile) Fernando Riera (1978–1980)
- (Chile) Manuel Rodríguez Vega (1981)
- (Chile) Ulises Ramos (1981)
- (Chile) Fernando Riera (1981–1982)
- (Chile) Luis Santibáñez (1983)
- (Chile) Ulises Ramos (1983–1984)
- (Chile) Hernán Carrasco (1984)
- (Chile) Luis Ibarra (1985)
- (Chile) Leonel Sánchez (1985–1986)
- (Chile) Fernando Riera (1987)
- (Chile) Leonel Sánchez (1987)
- (Chile) Alberto Quintano (1987)
- (Chile) Manuel Pellegrini (1988–1989)
- (Chile) Luis Ibarra (1989)
- (Chile) Manuel Rodríguez Vega (1990)
- (Chile) Pedro Morales (1990–1991)
- (Chile) Alberto Quintano (1991)
- (Chile) Arturo Salah (1992–1994)
- (Chile) Jorge Socías (1994–1995)
- (Argentina) Miguel Ángel Russo (1996)
- (Chile) Roberto Hernández (1997–1998)
- (Chile) César Vaccia (1999–2001)
- (Chile) Víctor Hugo Castañeda (2002–2003)
- (Chile) Héctor Pinto (2004–2005)
- (Chile) Gustavo Huerta (2006)
- (Argentina) Salvador Capitano (2007)
- (Chile) Jorge Socías (2007)
- (Chile) Arturo Salah (2007–2008)
- (Uruguay) Sergio Markarián (2009)
- (Argentina) José Basualdo (2009)
- (Uruguay) Gerardo Pelusso (2010)
- (Argentina) Jorge Sampaoli (2011–2012)
- (Argentina) Darío Franco (2013)
- (Chile) Marco Antonio Figueroa (2013–2014)
- (Chile) Cristián Romero (2014)
- (Uruguay) Martín Lasarte (2014–2015)
- (Argentina) Sebastián Beccacece (2016)
- (Chile) Víctor Hugo Castañeda (2016)
- (Argentina) Ángel Guillermo Hoyos (2017–2018)
- (Chile) Esteban Valencia (2018)
- (Argentina) Frank Darío Kudelka (2018–2019)
- (Uruguay) Alfredo Arias (2019)
- (Argentina) (Chile) Hernán Caputto (2019–2020)
- (Chile) Marcelo Jara (2020)
- (Venezuela) Rafael Dudamel (2020–2021)
- (Chile) Esteban Valencia (2021)
- (Chile) Cristián Romero (2021)
- (Colombia) Santiago Escobar (2022)
- (Chile) Sebastián Miranda (2022)
- (Uruguay) Diego López (2022)
- (Chile) Sebastián Miranda (2022)
- (Argentina) Mauricio Pellegrino (2023)
- (Argentina) Gustavo Álvarez (2024–2025)
- (Argentina) Francisco Meneghini (2026)
- (Chile) Jhon Valladares (2026)
- (Argentina) Fernando Gago (2026–)

== Average home attendances of Universidad de Chile ==
2016–17 Clausura: 33,466
2016–17 Apertura: 30,041
2015–16 Clausura: 19,641
2015–16 Apertura: 12,901

== See also ==
- Universidad de Chile
- Los de Abajo
- Ballet Azul
