= Afro-Chileans =

Ethnic group in Chile

Afrochilenos (Spanish)
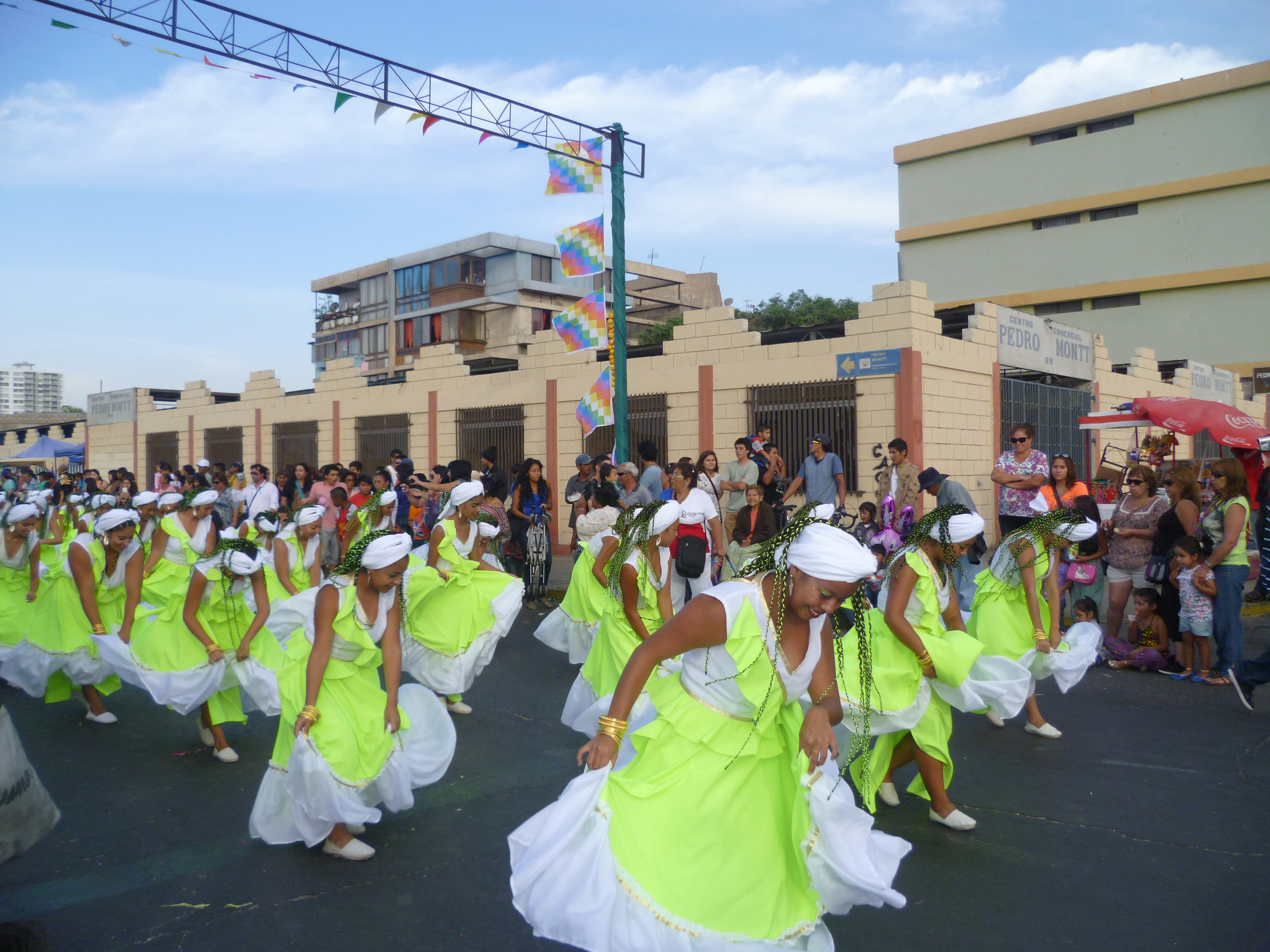
- Black Chilean women at Carnaval con la Fuerza del Sol in 2014

Total population
- Est. 195,809 (total); 1,529 (0.0008% African-Born population 2017); 8,415 (0.05% Chilean-Born population 2013); 185,865 (1% Haitian-Chilean population 2019)

Regions with significant populations
- Arica y Parinacota Region, Tarapacá Region, Santiago Metropolitan Region

Languages
- Majority: Spanish (Chilean dialects, Caribbean dialects); Minority: Haitian Creole • French • Niger-Congo languages • Bantu languages

Religion
- Majority: Roman Catholicism; Minority: Protestantism • Islam • Buddhism • Haitian Vodou • Animism • Atheism

Related ethnic groups
- Other Afro-Latin Americans

Afro-Chileans or Black Chileans are Chilean people of Black African descent. They may be descendants of slaves who were brought to Chile via the trans-Atlantic slave trade, or recent migrants from other parts of Latin America, the Caribbean or Africa.

== History ==
=== Atlantic slave trade ===
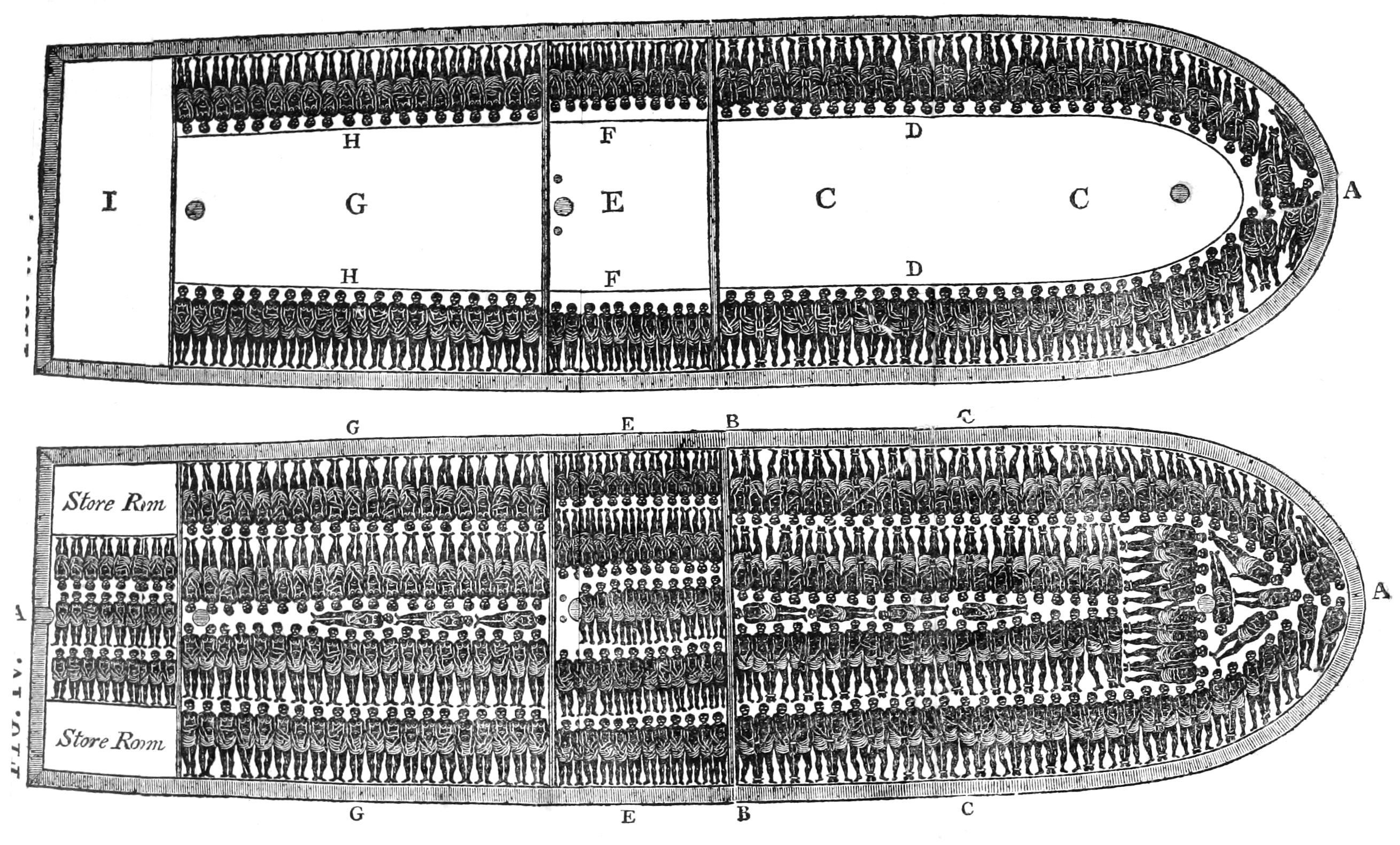
Interior layout of an 18th century Slave ship.

The Atlantic African slaves were first brought to what is now Chile in 1536 as part of Diego de Almagro's expedition to the region. About a hundred black slaves are estimated to have departed with Almagro south from Cusco in 1535. Almagro's African concubine Malgarida was the first non-Amerindian woman to enter the territory of what is today Chile. Almagro's expedition did however not result in any Spanish or African settlement in Chile. After crossing the Atlantic Ocean from the western coast of Africa, two overland routes trafficked many enslaved Africans to the colony: one crossing west from the northern coast of South America, and another traveling north from Buenos Aires over the Pampas and the Andes. Many slaves did not survive the difficult journey in captivity. The port of Valparaíso was also utilized in the slave trade for maritime transport of captives.

Given that the type of economic activity in colonial times, for climatic reasons, was never any large tropical plantations (cotton, sugar and tobacco, among others), Europeans did not see the need to import a large contingents of black slaves, like that of the Caribbean. Another reason was that, as a result of the Arauco War, indigenous Mapuche people were stolen from their lands, which in turn were exported to Peru, at a much cheaper price than that of a black slave. Although no economic benefits led to any large importation of African slaves to Chile, roughly around 6,000 Africans were transported directly to Chile where they went into mainly domestic service as a means of status for colonists and as a work force in the mining of gold in Arica. By 1590 Afro-Chileans made up 20,000 people, but by the time of emancipation made up only 4,000 in 1823.

=== Slavery in Arica ===
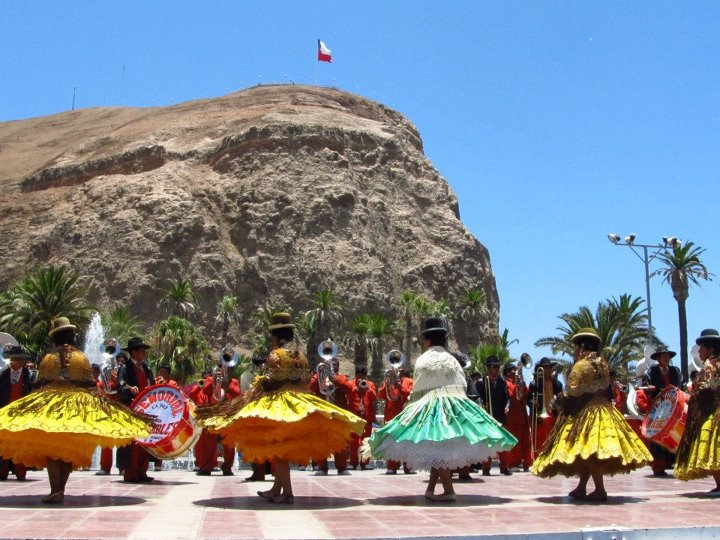
Afro-Chileans at a festival taking place near El Morro of Arica.

The black or Afro-descendant population of present-day Arica was considerable during the colonial era. The city was founded in 1570 and belonged to the Viceroyalty of Peru and between 1824 and 1880, to the Republic of Peru. This last year was annexed to Chile, after it won the Pacific War. The city received this large number of slaves because its territory was optimal for the cultivation of cotton and sugar cane in the Azapa Valley. Most of the slaves who arrived came from the West Indies or the African continent, especially from the areas of present-day Democratic Republic of the Congo, Republic of the Congo and Angola. In addition, after the discovery of the silver mines of Potosí, Arica became the main port of disembarkation of the slaves who were taken there.

During that time, the Spaniards did not live mostly in Arica, as the anopheles, a species of mosquito, present in the Azapa Valley, transmitted the deadly disease of malaria. Black Africans or their descendants settled in Arica were less susceptible to tropical diseases. In 1793, the book Guía del Perú was published, which reported on the ethnic composition of the inhabitants of the "Partido de Arica".

=== Afro-Peruvian soldier-settlers in Valdivia ===
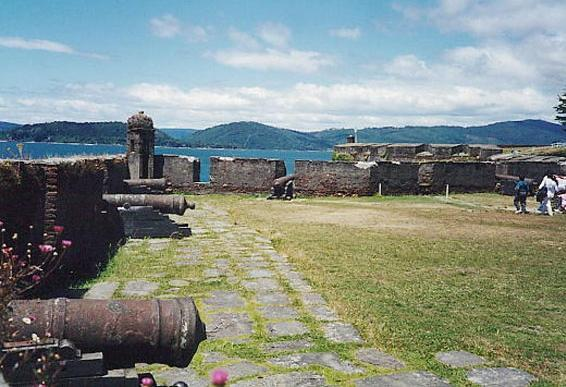
The main Fort of Corral, Chile

Once Spanish presence in Valdivia was reestablished in 1645, authorities had convicts from all-over the Viceroyalty of Peru construct the Valdivian Fort System. The convicts, many of whom were Afro-Peruvians, became soldier-settlers once they had served their term. Close contacts with indigenous Mapuche meant many soldiers were bilingual in Spanish and Mapudungun. A 1749 census in Valdivia shows that Afro-descendants had a strong presence in the area. Although most Afro-Peruvians came as convicts, Chilean slaves who arrived at the ports of Coquimbo and Valparaiso were two or three times more expensive.

=== War of Independence ===
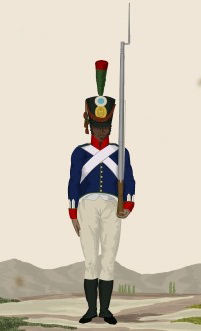
Member of the 8th Regiment of the Army of the Andes.

General San Martín formed the army with 3 generals, 28 chiefs, 207 officers, 15 civilian employees, 3,778 enlisted men (made up of a majority of black and mulatto soldiers, more than half freed slaves. A specific group of blacks in Chilean history are the members of the 8th Regiment of the Army of the Andes that fought the Spaniards in Chacabuco. That was the army organized by the United Provinces of the Río de la Plata and led by José de San Martín to liberate Chile and later allow the liberation of Peru. San Martín demanded black slaves as contribution to the Army of the Andes by the Mendoza landowners, because in his opinion blacks were the only people capable of participating in the infantry component of the army, and included them in the forces commanded later by Bernardo O'Higgins. They were included in the Army of the Andes and received their freedom after the crossing of the Andes and the fight against the Spaniards. As members of the infantry they were exposed to higher risks during battle. This episode of the history of Chile is very seldom mentioned and the group of blacks has never received any recognition for their contribution to the liberation of Chile.

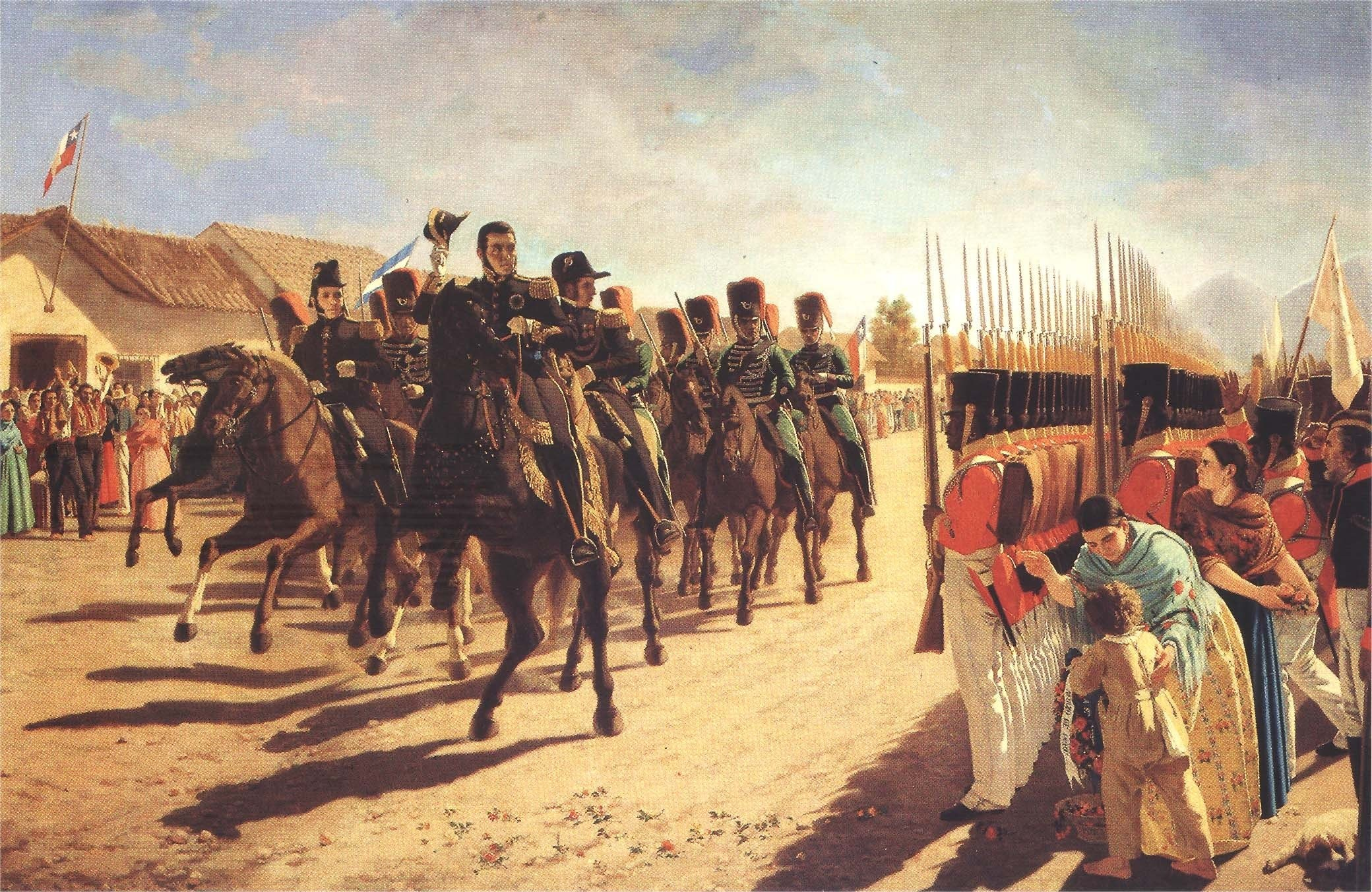
José de San Martín reviewing in Rancagua the troops who were supposed to campaign in Peru. (Magazine of Rancagua, work of Juan Manuel Blanes, 1872).

The number of black soldiers in the Andean army of San Martín during the liberation of Chile from the Spanish throne was numerous and the majority of soldiers from the regiments called numbers 7, 8 and 11 of the Andes infantry were grouped together, but in said regiments all the officers and non-commissioned officers they had to be white according to Argentine law, although San Martín wanted to change the rules so that at least black soldiers would reach the ranks of corporals and sergeants. However, traditionally the Spanish colonial army had battalions of blacks divided into slave and free castes, and San Martín believed it even more difficult to gather people of color and whites fighting as a troop in the same unit. Later both groups numbers 7 and 8 will be recast in Peru in the black regiment of Río de la Plata. The number 4 of Chile, initially white Creoles, will also be converted by his slave recruit from Peru into a black regiment. So the origin of the recruit of people of color was geographically diverse, and consisted of black slaves or freedmen (whether they are Africans or Creole blacks), and in addition to free castes, called in the colony pardos and morenos.

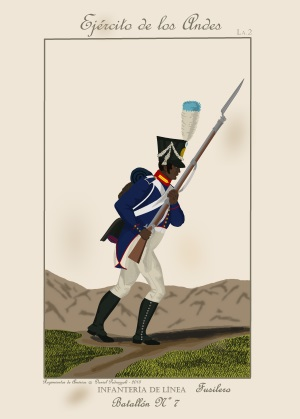
Rifleman of the 7th Infantry Battalion of the Andes Army.

In 1816 a part of the 7th Infantry Regiment joined the army under the command of Lieutenant Colonel Pedro Conde, with 600 blacks. In December of that year, San Martín ordered the division of the regiment into two independent battalions: the 8th Infantry Battalion and the 7th Infantry Battalion, under the command of Lieutenant Colonels Ambrosio Crámer and Pedro Conde, respectively. It was agreed with the Cuyan owners that two thirds of the slaves would be incorporated into the army, with 710 being recruited in Cuyo. Thus, although a contingent arrived with number 8 from Buenos Aires, most of its troops were recruited in the provinces. However, the army was nourished mainly by slaves (which Lynch estimates at 1,554 slaves). The age for the recruitment of slaves initially imposed between 16 and 35 years, was extended between 14 and 55 years.

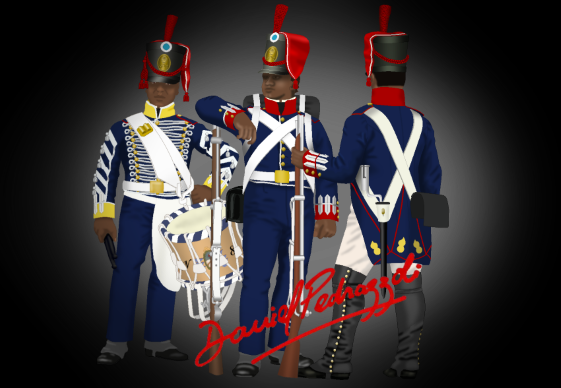
Rifleman and hunter uniforms of the Regiment 7 of the Andes Infantry.

According to the military doctrine of San Martín, the colored soldiers would serve better in the infantry branch of the three arms of the army of the Andes, in fact they will end up representing 2/3 of their number, estimating between 2,000 and 3,000 Argentine freedmen who crossed the Andes to Chile in 1817 with San Martín. Of those 2,500 black soldiers who began the crossing of the Andes, only 143 were repatriated alive.

=== Ban of slavery ===
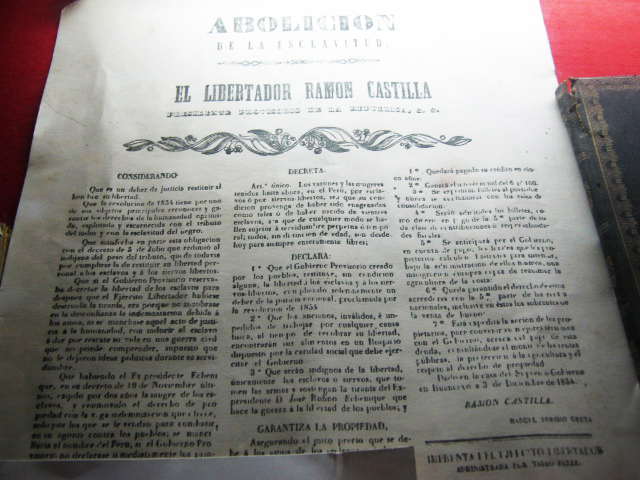
The Abolition Journal on the Freedom of Slaves.

With the Freedom of Wombs, slavery was stopped during 1811. The law freed the children of slaves born in Chilean territory, regardless of their parents' condition. The slave trade was banned and the slaves who stayed for more than six months in Chilean territory were automatically declared freedmen. By 1823, Chile was the second country in the Americas to prohibit slavery, after Haiti. The abolition freed close to five thousand slaves that lived in the country.

Despite the gradual emancipation of most black slaves in Chile, slavery continued along the Pacific coast of South America throughout the 19th century, as Peruvian slave traders kidnapped Polynesians, primarily from the Marquesas Islands and Easter Island, and forced them to perform physical labour in mines and in the guano industry of Peru and Chile.

=== Annexation of Arica ===
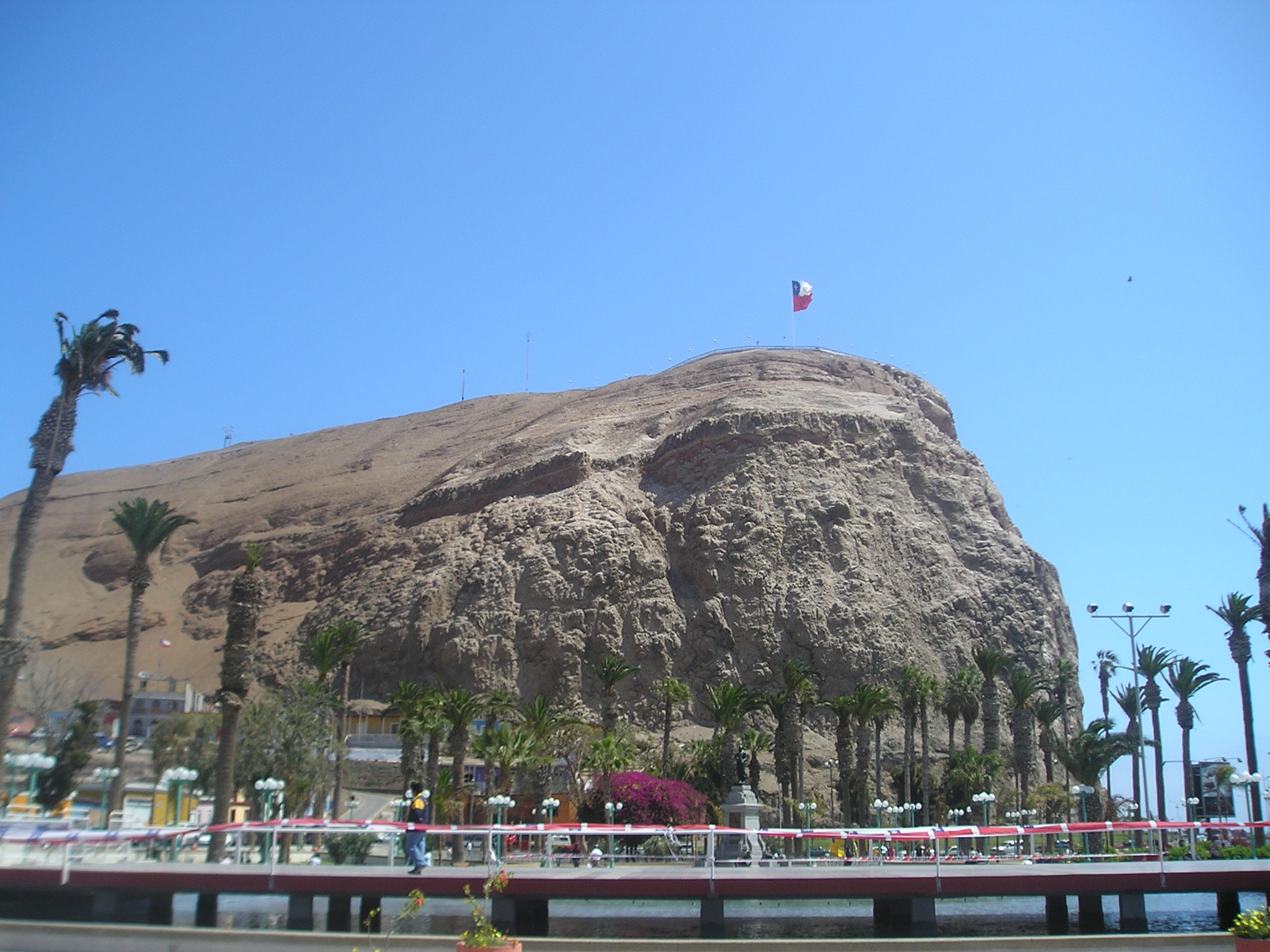
El Morro de Arica was the site of an important battle during the War of the Pacific.

The population of African origin formed the basis of the Arica militias during the Colony and the Peruvian Republic. Thus existed the Pardos de Arica battalion, a member of the Peruvian royal army, and years later the Arica Battalion No. 27, under the command of Colonel Julio Mac-Lean, brother of the last Peruvian mayor of Tacna before the occupation. Chilean, killed alongside his unit during the Battle of Alto de la Alianza. One of the African heroes during the war would have been 16-year-old Corporal Alfredo Maldonado Arias, who during the capture of Arica sacrificed himself by setting fire to the gunpowder of the strong Citadel when he saw Chilean troops hoisting their flag in it.

=== Modernity ===
Currently, the majority of Afro-Chileans are concentrated in the extreme north of the country, especially in the Arica and Parinacota Region, particularly in the Lluta, Azapa and La Chimba valleys.

In practice, there is no official government mechanism that allows the exact number of Afro-descendants in Chile to be measured, but steps were taken so that the “Afro-descendant” ethnic group was included in the Chilean census of 2012. Notwithstanding the initiatives of different national and international social organizations, these have not been successful, since Sebastián Piñera's administration denied the inclusion of the question about the African origin for the last census., neither were they considered in the Chilean census of 2017.

Most Afro-Chileans in modernity are descendants of immigrants, mainly from Haiti, see Haitian-Chileans, and mixed backgrounds. The major reason for this is the strong miscegenation that for many decades erased the African ethnic group as a distinct group via Blanqueamiento and mestizaje. Genetic studies indicate that in 2014, 3.8% of the Chilean genome came from Sub-Saharan Africans, where the highest share is found in the regions of Tarapacá (5.7%), Antofagasta (5.0%), and the Region Metropolitan (4.5%), and the lowest in Aysén (0.3%).

== Cultural contributions ==
=== Cueca and Zamacueca Chilena ===
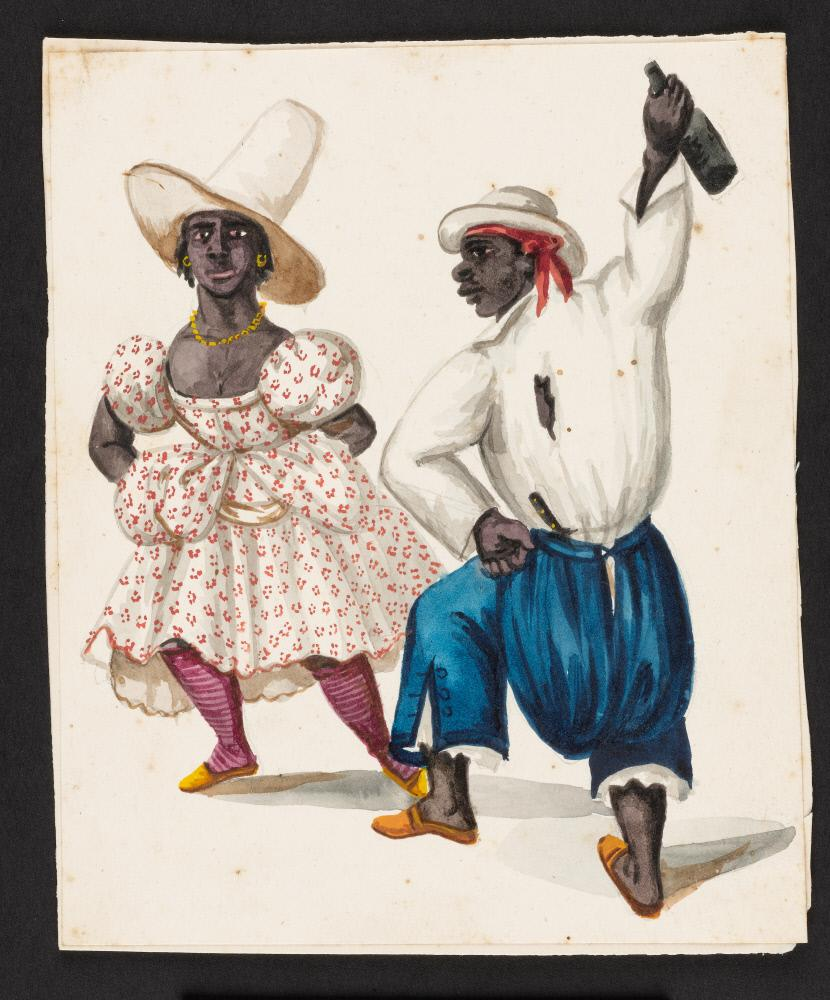
Afro-descendants dancing the Zamacueca.

The origin of the zamacueca and Cueca comes from the musical mestization that occurred between the gypsies and the mulattoes who inhabited Lima during the Viceroyalty of Peru. The temperament, the satire and the lamentable and rebellious execution of the guitar have a gypsy origin, while the choral form and the tundete have African origin. It dates back to the sixteenth and seventeenth centuries where this mixed musical form began to stand out in the Rímac, Barrios Altos, in neighborhoods of Callao and in bars located between the bridges, alleys and balconies of Lima.

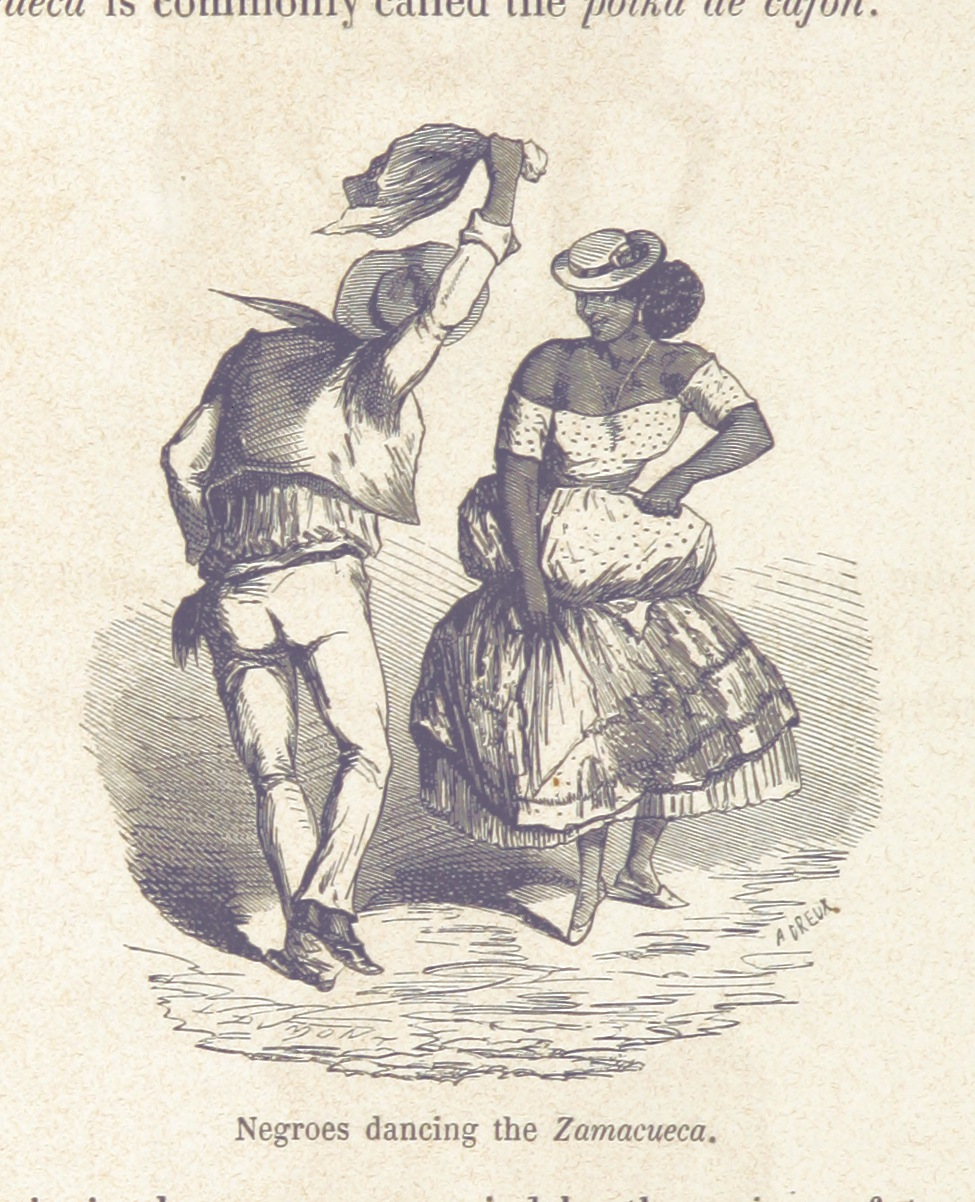
Zamacueca dance recorded in 1886 in Peru by the British Library.

The name "zamacueca" comes from "zamba clueca" where the "zamba" (black / Amerindian mestizo woman) makes movements like a "clueca" hen that has laid an egg. The musicologist Nicomedes Santa Cruz indicates that, in Kimbundu, the word "zamba", or samba, means 'dance', while the word "cueca" alludes to "clueca", the state of aggression that the hen after laying her eggs in front of the male.

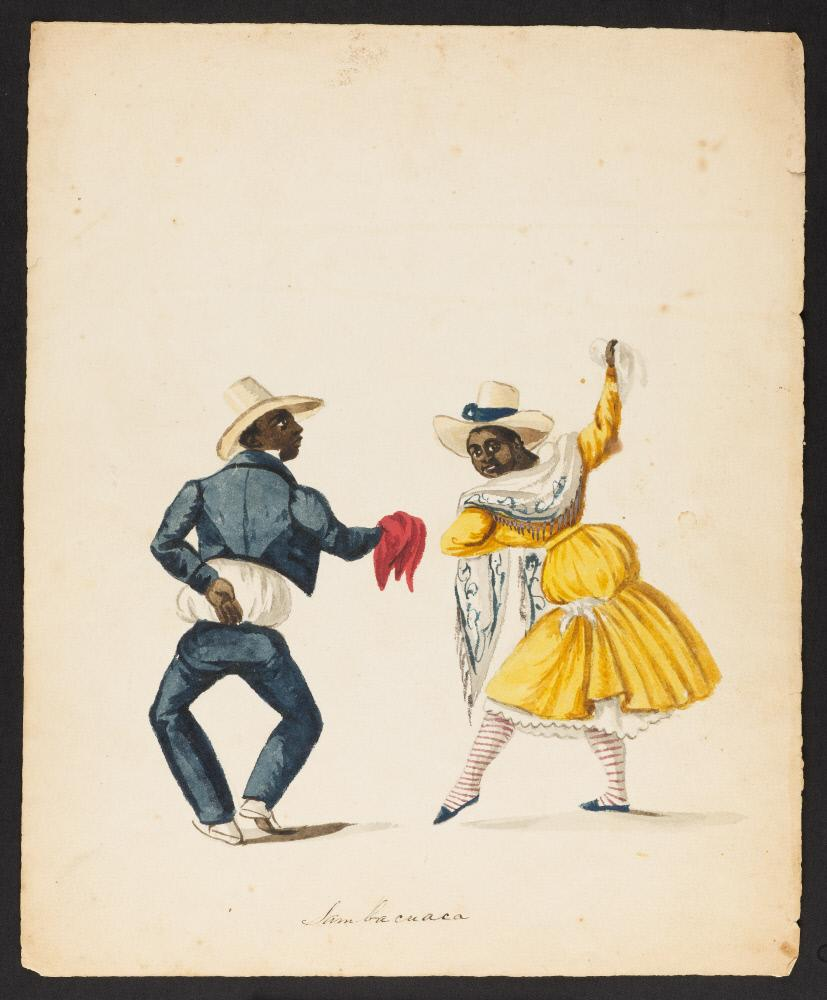
Zambacueca in Peru.

In the early 1800s the dance was called "zamba" and then "zamacueca", which Africanists consider the origin of the sailor and other dances such as the "mozamala", the "cueca" or the "dance of the handkerchief".

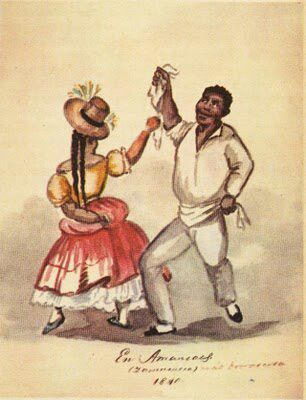
Zamacueca Peruana.

The customary Fernando Romero Pintado indicates that the colonial dance called "Zamba" performed by Bozals and mulattoes is the mother of the zamacueca and grandmother of the sailor. Also, the researcher José Durand maintains that the zamacueca is the mother of the sailor.

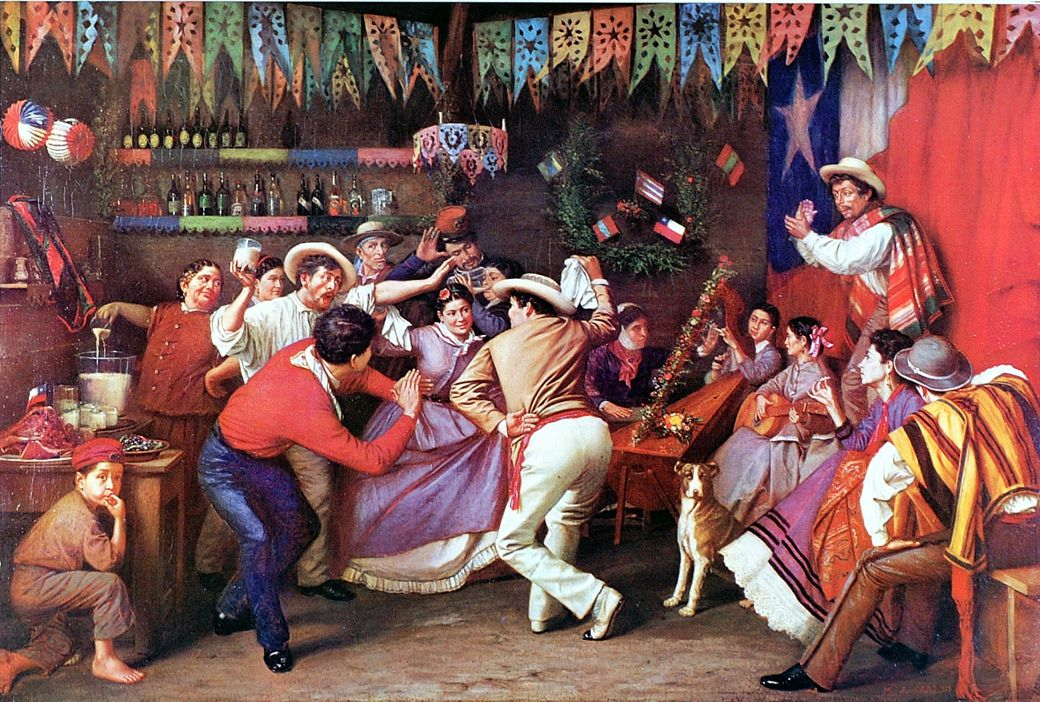
Zamacueca Chilena in Chile.

Another etymological analysis indicates that it would go back to the musical forms belonging to the Gypsy-Andalusian tradition brought by the Spaniards to Chile, which would have its antecedents in the Moorish element of the zambra (From the Hispanic Arabic zámra, and this from the classical Arabic zamr, 'tocata'). Although possible, it is important to know that other dances such as the Zamba in Bolivia and Samba in Brazil have their origins in the Kimbundu and Kikongo languages as well.

=== Tumbe ===
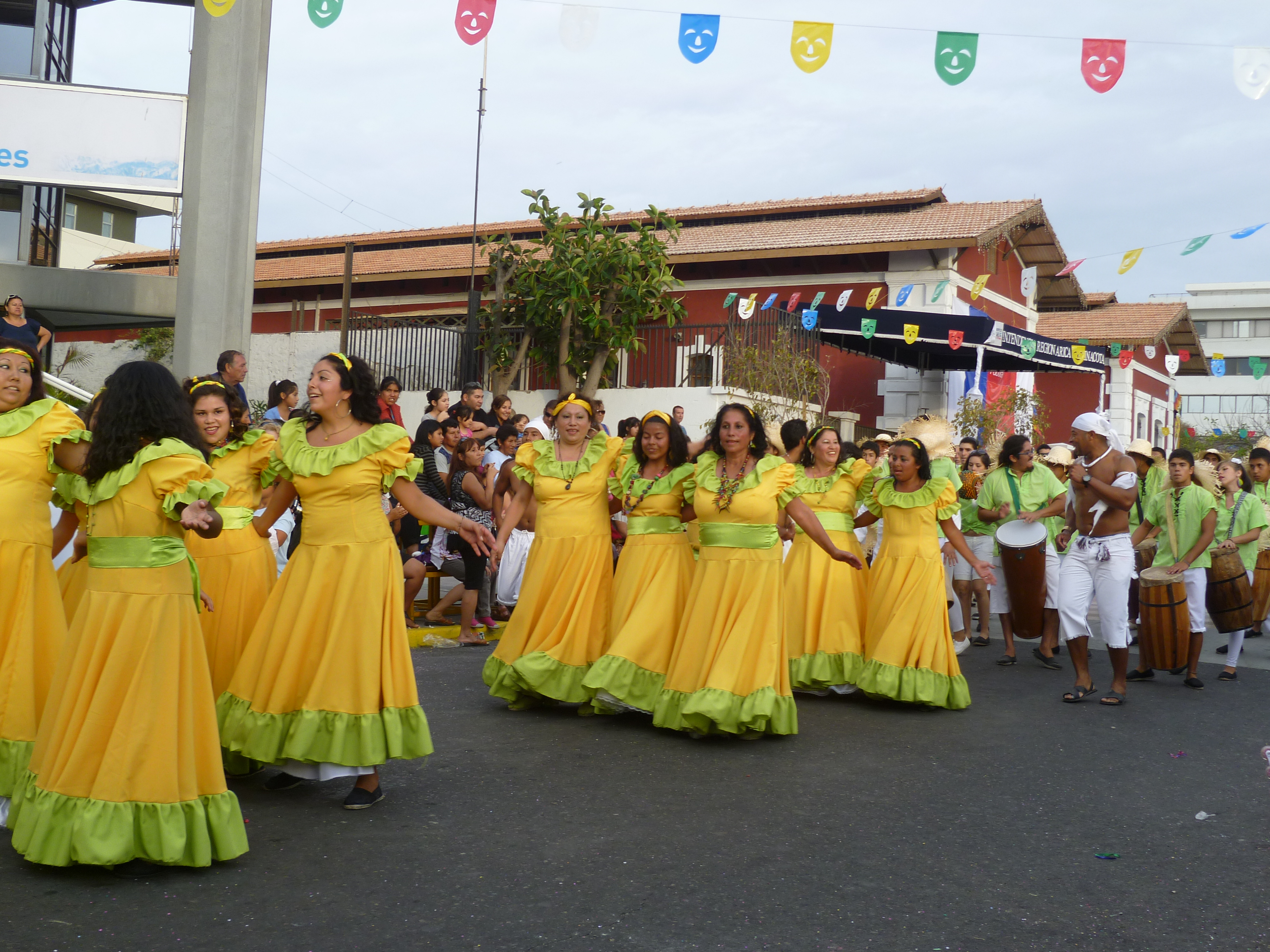
Representation of Tumbe by Arica Negro in the 2012 Carnaval Andino.

The Tumbe is an Afro-Descendant dance that is currently danced in northern Chile by Afroariqueñas, brought to the continent by African slaves 400 years ago in the Azapa Valley under the Spanish colony. Being this region one of the main ones with Afro origins descended from Chile. Around the second half of the twentieth century the claim of the Afro populations in South America burst in with it the Tumbe del valle de azapa.

== Current issues and discrimination ==
Discrimination and social exclusion have been another important issue in recent times for Afro-descendants in Chile. In the southern areas of the country, the presence of blacks is almost non-existent and the majority are foreign immigrants or passing tourists. This, added to the absence of historical ties in the area, provokes a feeling of mistrust, rejection and the appearance of prejudices around the black community. On the other hand, in the north of Chile, the case of José Corvacho, an Afro-descendant official of the Solidarity and Social Investment Fund (FOSIS) of the Arica and Parinacota Region, was known to public opinion in December 2010, who was fired according to their statements due to their skin color. This fact led to the resignation of the Regional Director of FOSIS and the corresponding investigations of the case, reopening the debate on ethnic inclusion in the country.

On April 8, 2019, the state of Chile gave legal recognition to the Afro-Chilean people through the enactment of Law 21,151.

=== Afro-Chilean organizations ===
Afro-Chilean flag created in 2020.

Afro-Chileans have formed various entities and organizations to defend their culture and identity: Organización Cultural Lumbanga, Colectivo de mujeres Luanda, Comparsa de la ONG Oro Negro, Comparsa Tumba Carnaval, Club del adulto mayor Julia Corvacho and Agrupación Arica Negro. These entities are coordinated through the Afro-Chilean Alliance.

== Notable Afro-Chileans ==
=== Historical figures ===
- Juan Beltrán de Magaña, conquistador (Afro-Spanish, from Guadalajara, Spain)
- José Romero (Peluca), soldier in the Chilean War of Independence (African mother)
- Juan Valiente, conquistador (Afro-Spanish, originally from Senegal)

=== Political figures ===
- Marta Salgado, activist for Afro-Chilean rights (Mulatto parents)

=== Artists and writers ===
- Mario Carreño, painter (Cuban naturalized Chilean)
- Pierre Desarmes, singer (Haitian naturalized Chilean)
- Pepe Pelayo, author, screenwriter, comedian (Cuban naturalized Chilean)
- Efrén Viera, musician (Cuban naturalized Chilean)
- Polimá Westcoast, singer (Angolan father)

=== Sportspeople ===
==== Basketball ====
- Ignacio Carrión, basketball player (Afro-American father)
- Mike Elliot Stambuk, basketball player (Afro-American father)
- Mack Hilton, basketball player and coach (Afro-American naturalized Chilean)
- Darrol Jones, basketball player (Afro-American father)
- Ziomara Morrison, basketball player (Afro-Panamanian father)

==== Football ====
- Aaron Astudillo, footballer (Venezuelan naturalized Chilean)
- José Balbuena, footballer (Afro-Peruvian naturalized Chilean)
- Augusto Barrios, footballer (Afro-descendant grandfather)
- Occupé Bayenga, footballer (Congolese naturalized Chilean)
- Jean Beausejour, footballer and sports commentator (Haitian father)
- Pedro Campos, footballer (Cuban father)
- Omar Carabalí, footballer (Afro-Ecuadorian naturalized Chilean)
- Pablo Cárdenas, footballer (Afro-Peruvian father)
- Segundo Castillo, footballer (Afro-Peruvian naturalized Chilean)
- Laura De La Torre (Afro-Colombian naturalized Chilean)
- Junior Fernandes, footballer (Afro-Brazilian parents)
- Willian Gama, footballer (Afro-Brazilian naturalized Chilean)
- Guillermo Larios, footballer (Afro-Peruvian parents)
- Paulo Magalhães, footballer (Afro-Brazilian father)
- Nayel Mehssatou, footballer (Moroccan father)
- Carlos Mina, footballer (Afro-Colombian naturalized Chilean)
- César Munder, footballer (Cuban naturalized Chilean)
- Joao Ortiz, footballer (Afro-Peruvian father)
- Pablo Pasache, footballer and coach (Afro-Peruvian naturalized Chilean)
- Sebastien Pineau, footballer (Afro-Peruvian mother)
- Gastón Rodríguez, footballer (Afro-Uruguayan naturalized Chilean)
- Juan Francisco Rossel, footballer (Afro-Ecuadorian mother)
- Adrián Sahibeddine, footballer (Moroccan grandfather)
- Mary Valencia (Afro-Colombian naturalized Chilean)
- Nicolás Valencia (Afro-Colombian father)
- Miguel Vargas, footballer (Afro-Peruvian father)
- Lawrence Vigouroux, footballer (Jamaican mother)

==== Other sports ====
- Julio Acosta, weightlifter (Cuban naturalized Chilean)
- Yasmani Acosta, Greco-Roman wrestler (Cuban naturalized Chilean)
- Néstor Almanza, Greco-Roman wrestler (Cuban naturalized Chilean)
- Berdine Castillo, athlete (Haitian naturalized Chilean)
- Oliver Elliot, swimmer (Afro-British father)
- Santiago Ford, athlete (Cuban naturalized Chilean)
- Arley Méndez, weightlifter (Cuban naturalized Chilean)
- Yunerki Ortega, para triathlete (Cuban naturalized Chilean)

=== Media personalities ===
- Steevens Benjamin, actor (Haitian naturalized Chilean)
- Paloma Elsesser, model (Afro-American mother)
- Juan Falcón, actor (Cuban naturalized Chilean)
- Mey Santamaría, model and TV presenter (Cuban naturalized Chilean)

=== In fiction ===
- "Benito Cereno", short story in The Piazza Tales by Herman Melville that features a Chilean sea captain and his slave ship.
- "El bandido", poem in Leyendas nacionales by Salvador Sanfuentes.
- El Mulato Riquelme, historical novel by Fernando Santiván.
- Gustavo Fring, character in the Breaking Bad and Better Call Saul television series.

== See also ==
- Demographics of Chile
- Haitian Chilean
- Racism in Chile
