= List of people from Kinshasa =

The following is a list of notable people from Kinshasa.

== Politics, military, business ==
- Nicole Nketo Bomele (born 1967 in Congo), Belgian politician, member of the Parliament of the Brussels-Capital Region
- Gael Bussa, politician elected National Deputy in the constituency of Budjala, in the province of South-Ubangi, in the 2018 Democratic Republic of the Congo general election.
- Justin Marie Bomboko, politician and statesman
- Mwazulu Diyabanza, pan-African activist and founder of the Front Multiculturel Anti-Spoliation
- David Norris, scholar and politician, 2011 election candidate for President of Ireland
- Joseph Damien Tshatshi, colonel in the Armée Nationale Congolaise

== Athletes ==
- Flo Thamba, starting center for 2020–21 NCAA Champion Baylor Bears basketball team
- D. J. Mbenga, professional basketball player for the Los Angeles Lakers in the US National Basketball Association
- Emmanuel Mudiay, professional basketball player of the New York Knicks in the US National Basketball Association
- Christian Eyenga, professional basketball player and 2009 first round draft choice for the Cleveland Cavaliers in the US National Basketball Association
- Dikembe Mutombo (1966–2024), former professional basketball player
- Christian M'Pumbu, professional mixed martial arts fighter and Bellator Fighting Championships World Champion
- Guylain Ndumbu-Nsungu, former Sheffield Wednesday football player
- Jeremy Bokila, professional football player, son of Ndingi Bokila Mandjombolo
- Claude Makélélé, professional football player and current manager
- Steve Mandanda, professional footballer who plays for Marseille and the France national football team
- Ariza Makukula, naturalised Portuguese retired professional football player
- José Bosingwa, naturalised Portuguese football player
- Leroy Lita, professional football player
- Fabrice Muamba, former professional footballer who played for Bolton Wanderers in the Premier League
- Tim Biakabutuka, former professional American football player
- Kazenga LuaLua, professional football player for Brighton & Hove Albion F.C.
- Lomana LuaLua, professional football player for Al-Arabi in Qatar
- Mwamba Kazadi, former professional football player who won the 1973 "African Footballer of the Year" award
- Péguy Luyindula, professional football player for Paris Saint-Germain in Ligue 1
- Hérita Ilunga, professional football player
- Gary Kikaya, retired Olympic 400-metre runner
- Patrick Kabongo, professional football player for the Edmonton Eskimos of the Canadian Football League
- Youssouf Mulumbu, professional footballer for Norwich City
- Danny Mwanga, professional footballer for the Philadelphia Union
- Blaise Nkufo, professional footballer for Switzerland
- Gabriel Zakuani, professional football player for Peterborough United of League One in England
- Steve Zakuani, professional football player for Seattle Sounders FC of Major League Soccer in the United States
- Occupé Bayenga, professional football player who currently plays in Universidad de Concepción, Chilean Primera División
- Christian Benteke, professional football player for Crystal Palace F.C. of the Premier League and the Belgium national football team
- Jody Lukoki, professional football player for Ludogorets Razgrad in the Bulgarian First League and the DR Congo national football team
- Aristote Nsiala, professional football player for Ipswich Town
- Silas Katompa Mvumpa, professional football player for VfB Stuttgart

== Artists ==
- Maître Gims, rapper-singer
- Jimmy Omonga, singer-songwriter
- Werrason, singer-songwriter
- Lokua Kanza, singer-songwriter
- Alain Kassanda, film maker, film director and cinematographer
- Ya Kid K, hip-hop artist
- Leki, R&B artist
- Jessy Matador, singer
- Kalash Criminel, rapper
- Odette Krempin, fashion designer
- Kaysha, hip-hop artist
- Merveille Lukeba, professional actor for the series Skins on E4
- Mohombi, pop, hip-hop artist
- Fally Ipupa, singer-songwriter
- Koffi Olomide, singer-songwriter
- Papa Wemba, singer-songwriter
- Damso- Singer, hip hop artist
- Defao - singer-songwriter, soukous artist

== Others ==
- Buata Malela, comparative literature specialist and historian
- Raïssa Malu, physicist, educator and politician
- Pierre Mambele, taxi driver with an extensive journalist clientele
- Ngalula Mubenga, engineer
- Celine Tendobi, gynecologist
