= Laura de la Torre =

Laura de la Torre may refer to:

- Laura de la Torre (volleyball) (born 1974), Spanish volleyball player
- Laura de la Torre (footballer) (born 1999), Chilean footballer
