= Spoliation =

Spoliation may refer to:

- Looting
- Spoliation of evidence in court proceedings
- The deconstruction of buildings for spolia

== Places and organizations ==
- Front Multiculturel Anti Spoliation
- Sanctuary of the Spoliation
- Spoliation Advisory Panel

== See also ==
- Nazi plunder
