= Joao Ortiz =

Joao Ortiz may refer to:

- Joao Ortiz (Chilean footballer) (born 1991), Chilean footballer
- Joao Ortiz (Ecuadorian footballer) (born 1996), Ecuadorian footballer
