= Eloy Ortiz =

Peruvian footballer (born 1961)

Narciso Eloy Bartolome Ortiz Campos (born 24 March 1961) is a Peruvian former professional footballer who played as a forward for clubs of Peru and Chile.

== Career ==
Ortiz was born in Lima, Peru. He began his career in Sporting Cristal in 1979, was part of the champion team of the following years alternated in the lead with consecrated as Juan Carlos Oblitas, Oswaldo Ramirez and Percy Rojas. He also played for the Unión Huaral and FBC Melgar in their country.

He also played many years in the Chilean football, highlighting its passage by Deportes Antofagasta, Santiago Wanderers, Unión La Calera, Audax Italiano, San Marcos de Arica and Deportes Santa Cruz, although only played in the rise of Chilean football, with the aforementioned clubs.

== Personal life ==
He is the uncle of Chilean footballer João Ortiz.

== Clubs ==
- Sporting Cristal 1978–1982
- Unión Huaral 1983
- FBC Melgar 1984–1985
- Juventud La Palma 1986
- Deportes Antofagasta 1987
- Santiago Wanderers 1988
- Unión La Calera 1989
- Audax Italiano 1990–1992
- San Marcos de Arica 1993–1995
- Deportes Santa Cruz 1996–1997

== Honours ==
Sporting Cristal

- Peruvian Primera División: 1979, 1980
