= Augusto Barrios =

Chilean footballer (born 1991)

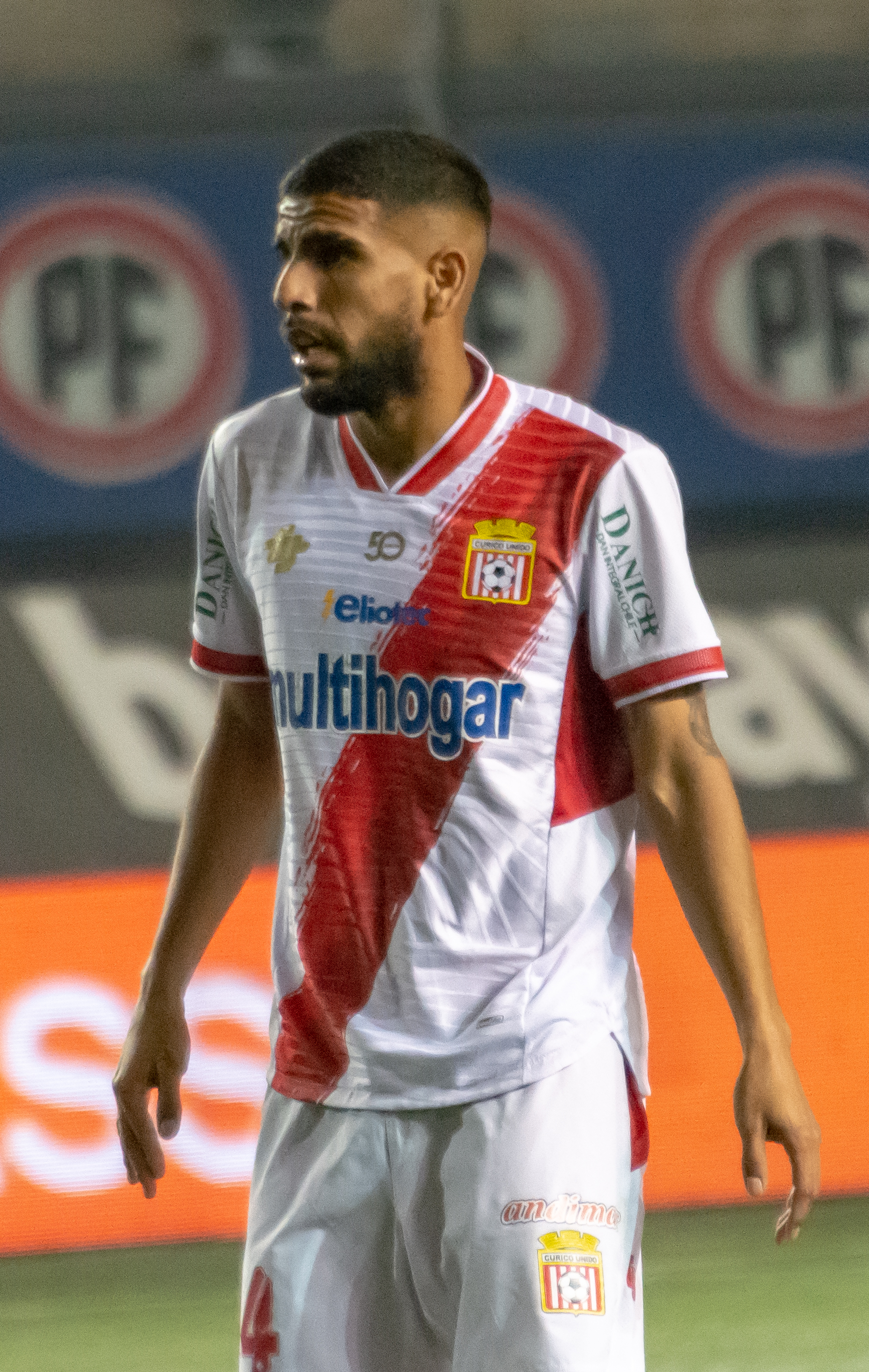
- Barrios with Curicó Unido in 2023

Personal information
- Full name: Augusto Sebastián Barrios Silva
- Date of birth: 3 October 1991 (age 35)
- Place of birth: Arica, Chile
- Height: 1.83 m (6 ft 0 in)
- Positions: Right-back; midfielder

Team information
- Current team: San Marcos

Youth career
- 2002–2006: San Marcos

Senior career*
Years	Team	Apps	(Gls)
2010–2017	San Marcos	99	(3)
2017	→ Deportes Antofagasta (loan)	20	(2)
2017–2018	Deportes Antofagasta	37	(1)
2019–2021	Universidad de Chile	28	(0)
2022	Unión Española	17	(0)
2023	Curicó Unido	22	(1)
2024–	San Marcos	0	(0)
- * Club domestic league appearances and goals as of 8 January 2024

Augusto Sebastián Barrios Silva (Note: In this Spanish name, the first or paternal surname is Barrios and the second or maternal family name is Silva.) (born October 3, 1991), known as Augusto Barrios, is a Chilean footballer currently playing for San Marcos de Arica of the Primera B de Chile.

== Career ==
In 2024, he joined San Marcos de Arica from Curicó Unido.

== Career statistics ==
As of match played on 18 March 2018

Appearances and goals by club, season and competition
Club	Season	League			Cup		League Cup		Other		Total	
Club	Season	Division	Apps	Goals	Apps	Goals	Apps	Goals	Apps	Goals	Apps	Goals
San Marcos	2010	Primera División of Chile	2	0	0	0	—				2	0
San Marcos	2011	Primera División of Chile	10	0	1	0	—				11	0
San Marcos	2012	Primera División of Chile	15	0	4	1	—				19	1
San Marcos	2013	Primera División of Chile	1	0	3	0	—				4	0
San Marcos	2013–14	Primera División of Chile	17	1	0	0	—				17	1
San Marcos	2014–15	Primera División of Chile	26	1	8	0	—				34	1
San Marcos	2015–16	Primera División of Chile	28	1	6	2	—				34	3
San Marcos	Total		99	3	22	3	0	0	0	0	121	6
Antofagasta	2016–17	Chilean Primera División	20	2	2	0	—				22	2
Antofagasta	2017	Chilean Primera División	15	1	7	0	—				22	1
Antofagasta	2018	Chilean Primera División	22	0	1	0	—				23	0
Antofagasta	Total		57	3	10	0	0	0	0	0	67	3
Career totals			156	6	32	3	0	0	0	0	188	9

== Personal life ==
Barrios is of African descent through his grandfather.

== Titles ==
- San Marcos de Arica 2012 and 2013-14 (Primera B de Chile Championship)
