= Marta Salgado =

Chilean activist (born 1947)

- Born: Marta Victoria Salgado Henríquez; 23 March 1947 (age 79); Arica, Chile
- Occupations: educator, activist

Marta Victoria Salgado Henríquez (born 23 March 1947) is a Chilean activist who focuses on promoting cultural preservation and civil rights protections for the African diaspora. She has founded several non-governmental organizations to promote women's and minority rights and served as a government advisor in these areas. Trained as a teacher and public administrator, she has written books and articles on the legacy of Africans in Chile.

== Early life ==
Marta Victoria Salgado Henríquez was born on 23 March 1947 in Arica, Chile to Marta Henríquez Corvacho and Santiago Salgado Cano. Her family, which includes her brother, Santiago, and sister, Sonia, is of African descent. She grew up in Arica, an area in which the majority of descendants of African slaves who arrived during the colonial period lived. Her mulatto parents experienced the government's objectives to "Chileanize" the region which had previously been part of Peru. Those residents who refused to nationalize as Chileans, were pushed out through forced emigration and those who remained, attempted to hide their ancestry to blend into the larger society.

After completing her secondary education, Salgado earned a degree in preschool education from the Universidad de Chile. She furthered her education at the Universidad de Tarapacá, acquiring a degree in public administration and completed postgraduate studies at UC earning certificates in community organization, gender, and planning and development.

== Career ==
Salgado began her career as a teacher in the state universities of the Arica-Parinacota region and spent 41 years as a professor at the University of Tarapacá. During her time at the university, Salgado was active in the creation of the Women’s Movement of the North and the founding of the National Women’s Service (Spanish: Servicio Nacional de la Mujer) to address domestic violence, and civil protections for women. Work with these organizations has resulted in legislation for the protection of women. She was a co-founder, and served as president for four terms, of the Universidad de Tarapacá' workers' union, as well as a similar organization, Federation of State University Employees of the North (Spanish: Federación de Trabajadores de las Universidades Estatales del Norte) for employees at other state institutions. Salgado was a participant in the twenty-four commissions held during 1994 and 2000 by the government of Arica to create the administrative region of Arica-Parinacota.

In 2001, Salgado founded the non-governmental organization Oro Negro (Black Gold), the first in the country to advocate for the inclusion of populations of African descent in public policies, which include both anti-discrimination and official recognition as an ethnic group with the legal protections that entails. From the founding of the organization, she coordinated folklore group of Oro Negro, attending conventions and meetings regarding the African diaspora throughout the Caribbean and Latin America. By creating networks with activists in places as far flung as Bolivia, the Caribbean, Ecuador, Equatorial Guinea, Honduras, Morocco, Paraguay and Uruguay, Salgado recognized that the problems of recognition were similar. Governments recognize the "Slave Route" as an educational and tourist-worthy part of the cultural heritage, but not the people themselves. Salgado pressed for the government to take a census of the Afro-Chilean population, as well as to sponsor programs to destigmatize participation in events designed to promote their culture, sensitizing the public to their right to have their ethnic identity protected. Between 2004 and 2008, Salgado was a member of the consulting committee of the Chilean Advisory Panel on Culture and the Arts (Spanish: Consejo de la Cultura y las Artes), as a representative of the Afro-Chilean community.

After more than a decade of pressuring the government, to prepare a statistical analysis of the Afro-Chilean community, Salgado and other activists were successful in obtaining a regional survey in 2011, but not in gaining national inclusion in the federal census as an ethnic minority. Her chapter "El legado africano en Chile" was published in the book Conocimiento desde adentro: Los afrosudamericanos hablando de sus pueblos y sus historias (2010), edited by Sheila Walker and her own publication Afrochilenos: Una historia oculta occurred in 2013. In 2016, Salgado was recognized with the governmental award from the Department of Cultural Heritage of the National Council for Culture and the Arts as Best Cultural Heritage Manager in the Region of Arica and Parinacota.
