= Racism in Chile =

Racism in Chile encompasses any type of racial or ethnic discrimination by a group of inhabitants or organizations of that country against groups from other nations or the same nation. The origins of Chilean racism, and that of other Latin American nations, can be traced back to 16th century colonialism under the rule of the Spanish Empire. In the establishment of imperial rule, Native Americans experienced extermination, slavery and forced miscegenation.

In Chile, Mapuches and Mestizos have been the primary victims of racism and ethnic discrimination. Other groups such as South American immigrants (Bolivian, Peruvian, and Colombian), black people, afro descendants, and Muslims are also included. Discrimination exists on many different levels, on the basis of culture, economic status, age, geography, as well as gender and sexuality.

In academia, studies surrounding racism in Chile have only just recently been looked at profoundly. Before 2010, there was little research surrounding racism in the country.

== Types of racism in Chile ==
=== Racism against indigenous peoples ===
With a significant racist mentality, the conquest of the territories of Bolivia and Peru in the 19th century was justified. During the War of the Pacific, Chilean state actors described those of their nationality as representatives of the superior white race, conquering the "inferior" lower race.

Between the second half of the 19th century and the first decades of the 20th century, what was called the Selkʼnam genocide took place, where European, Argentine and Chilean settlers exterminated the Selkʼnam or Ona people, an Amerindian people who inhabited the Isla Grande de Tierra del Fuego, in the extreme south of the country. This genocide had both economic and racist reasons in between.

This attitude was maintained in the Pinochet-led dictatorship, which remained in power until 1990, an example of that is that the Chilean admiral José Toribio Merino described the Bolivians as "metamorphic representatives of the camel".

Despite the significant dismissal of the local population, Chileans still have widespread neglect of the indigenous population, particularly the Mapuche, who have been distinguished by considerable opposition.

=== Racism against black people ===
Due to the early ban of slavery after Chile's independence and the previous few black slaves during the Spanish rule, Chile had almost no black population. Since the end of the military dictatorship, the first immigrants arrived, but few were of African ancestry, being most of them from neighbour countries like Peru. In 2014, for the first time a bigger group of black migrants arrived in Chile and created a diaspora mainly from Haiti. Neo-Nazi movements chasing black people in the country were recorded in the 90's and early 00's, but they targeted mainly LGBT, homeless and punks due to the lack of black people at the time.

=== Antisemitism ===
The first case of large-scale incitement of antisemitic hysteria in Chile was the idea of the "Andinia Plan" formed in the 19th century in parallel with the beginning of the migration of Jews from the Russian Empire to the American continents: fears arose between the Chilean population about the desire of the Jews to steal the lands of Patagonia to form their own state in them.

According to the Anti-Defamation League, cases of desecration of Jewish cemeteries and insults, or the call for retaliation against Jews, graffiti in synagogues are widespread in Chile.

== 19th century ==
Between 1879 and 1883, the War of the Pacific – an armed conflict between Chile on one side and Bolivia and Peru on the other – ensued. The memory of this war, which ended in Chile’s favor and resulted in the loss of land in the defeated nations, has since brought about enmity. The rivalries between both sides may sometimes be interpreted as expressions of racism, while in other cases the hostility effectively corresponds to the cause and trigger of modern racism. This racist attitude is sustained by a variety of Chilean history books that assert that part of Chile’s triumph was due to its “racial homogeneity.”

In the second half of the 19th century and the first decades of the 20th century, the Selkʼnam genocide transpired. European settlers, Argentinians, and Chileans – with both economic and racist motivations – exterminated the Selkʼnam (Ona) people, an indigenous group that inhabited Isla Grande of the Tierra del Fuego region at the southern extreme of the country.

== 20th and 21st centuries ==
There are several contemporary Chilean essayists and historians who have assumed racist tendencies in their work. Nationalist Nicolás Palacios (1858–1911), author of Raza Chilena, promoted the intermarriage of Germanic peoples with the mapuche race, which produced, according to Palacios, a blond and stocky "roto chileno". Politician and diplomat Galvarino Gallardo (1877–1957) agreed with Palacios, rejecting pre-Columbian origins from the Chilean race, praising the kinship of Germanic people. Historian and essayist Francisco Antonio Encina (1874–1965), for his part, looked down upon the mapuche people, liberalism, and "latinoamericanismo". Historian Jaime Eyzaguirre (1908–1968) was a follower of fascist dictator Francisco Franco, as described in his written work and the work of his followers Gonzalo Vial and Fernando Silva, among others. According to historian Rafael Luis Gumucio, the works of Encina and Eyzaguirre exhibit in the international relations between Peru, Bolivia, and Argentina a nationalist attitude that diminishes the image of these neighboring peoples. Gumucio suggests that the work of these historians has negatively influenced modern international relations among them all.

According to one of the few Chilean investigative groups on the topic, one of the more recent causes that has helped to sustain and strengthen racist attitudes and misconceptions about people because of the color of their skin is derived from the racist stereotypes that have developed in the world, especially in the United States, a very influential country in Chile at the social level.

Peruvian immigration in Chile has increased sharply in recent decades. Many Chileans negatively stereotype said Peruvians, the situation that those referred to as the "Pequeña Lima" experience in Santiago being an emblematic point. People from other latitudes who have migrated to Chile recently have also been victims of racism and discrimination. Such is the case for mixed-race indigenous people from distinct parts of Latin America, in particular Afro-Colombians in northern cities like Antofagasta, black people, Palestinians, and Muslims. In 2010, the immigration of Haitian and Dominican people also increased greatly, and they have similarly become victims of xenophobia.

Additionally, since the beginning of the 1990s, after the return of democracy, there have been reports of active right-wing extremists and neo-Nazi groups with racist, antisemitic, and homophobic attitudes. With the explosive development of the Internet and social media since the beginning of the 21st century, people have created various Chilean websites where they have proliferated racist and Nazi discourses, death threats, and hate speech.

For their part, some factions of the Mapuche people have also demanded ethnicity-based control of those who should be able to enter the conflict zone in the south of the country, demanding "the cessation of entry of non-mapuche people in mapuche territory" and "a negotiation to impede the entrance of foreign people into region inhabited by the mapuches."

== See also ==
- Scientific racism
