= Nicole Nketo Bomele =

Belgian politician (born 1967)

Nicole Nketo Bomele (born 29 June 1967) is a Belgian politician who serves as a member of the Parliament of the Brussels-Capital Region.

== Biography ==
Nicole Nketo Bomele was born in Kinshasa, Congo on 29 June 1967. At age nine, Bomele and her family moved to Belgium. In 1991, Bomele graduated from Universite catholique de Louvain with a degree in public and international relations. After university, she worked as a diplomat at the Congolese Embassy in Madrid, Spain. She returned to Congo several years later and became a television journalist in Kinshasa. In 1998, Bomele returned to international relations, serving in the Congolese Ministry of Foreign Affairs and that same year, she became a diplomat for the Congolese Embassy in Brazzaville, Congo.

In 2003, Bomele returned to Belgium, where she volunteered for six years for several associations and organizations. In 2009, Bomele founded Anderlecht en couleurs, a multiracial non-profit youth organization. She originated the local association and its youth festival called “Anderlecht in colors.”

Since 2006, Bomele has served as a Community Councilor in Anderlecht. Originally elected as a member of the Humanist Democratic Centre party (called cdH), she changed parties to the Parti socialiste, and later ran as a member of the Démocrate fédéraliste indépendant (DéFI) in the 2018 Belgian local elections. In the 2019 Belgian regional elections, Bomele was elected as a member of the Brussels-Capital Region Parliament when the mayor of Schaerbeek, Bernard Clerfayt, decided not to take his seat.

In April 2024, Bomele, who was seen as a "strong candidate with widespread support," withdrew from the regional DéFI list surprising Brussels politicians, raising speculation about her reasons for stepping down and any implications for future electoral prospects for DéFI.
