= Odette Krempin =

Congolese entrepreneur and honorary consul

Odette Maniema Krempin
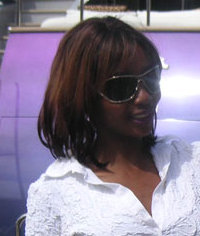
- Odette Krempin
- Born: October 30, 1973; Maniema, Zaire
- Died: June 27, 2016 (aged 42); Goma, Democratic Republic of the Congo
- Occupations: honorary consul, philanthropist

Princess Odette Maniema Krempin (October 30, 1973 – June 27, 2016) was an African entrepreneur and former honorary consul of the Democratic Republic of the Congo in Frankfurt.

Krempin grew up in the province of Maniema, until her family moved to Paris when she was eight years old. She became a tailor, studied fashion design in Paris and Marrakesh, and opened a boutique in Niger at the age of 20. Krempin moved to Frankfurt in 2007, and founded the Deutsch-Afrikanisches Jugendwerk, a teaching organization.

In September 2011, Krempin was appointed Chairwoman of Somima, a mining company in the Democratic Republic of the Congo.

She was the subject of various scandals involving allegations of fraud, embezzlement of donations and other financial improprieties. Doubts were also thrown upon the veracity of her business-related claims. In 2012, she declared personal bankruptcy in Germany. For non-payment of personal invoices and failure to appear, a German criminal court sentenced her to a payment of €15,000 in 2015.

Together with her then-boyfriend Stefan De Witte, she disappeared in 2014 while being sought for questioning by Belgian police in the Duferco corruption scandal, which had led to multiple arrests and the resignation of Serge Kubla as mayor of Waterloo, Belgium.

She died in Goma in the summer of 2016.
