= Occupé Bayenga =

Chilean footballer (born 1989)

Personal information
- Full name: Occupé Bayenga Lopalo
- Date of birth: 8 November 1989 (age 37)
- Place of birth: Kinshasa, Zaire (now DR Congo)
- Height: 1.82 m (6 ft 0 in)
- Position: Striker

Senior career*
Years	Team	Apps	(Gls)
2009–2010	Cañuelas	30	(6)
2011	Copiapó	24	(4)
2012	U. de Concenpción	0	(0)
2012	Deportes Concepción	0	(0)

International career^{‡}
2009	DR Congo U20	2	(0)
- * Club domestic league appearances and goals as of 13 December 2011 ‡ National team caps and goals as of 14 December 2011

Occupé Bayenga Lopalo (born 8 November 1989) is a Congolese naturalized Chilean footballer who plays for Universidad de Concepción as a striker.

Bayenga previously played for Argentine side Cañuelas during 2009 to 2010 and then Deportes Copiapó of Chile in 2011.

He was one of the first African players in play at Chile, being the fourth after of Ike Uzoma, Luc Bessala and Ekele Udojoh and also was the first of his continent in score a goal at the football of that country in a 3–2 away loss of Copiapó against Magallanes.

== Club career ==
=== Early career ===
Bayenga traveled from the Congo to Argentina in 2009, for play in the Primera D side Cañuelas. He signed on mid-year for that team thanks for a friendship of his uncle with an important member of the club board. Within a short time at Cañuelas, he became the favourite player of the fans despite also of be nominated to the bench of frequently form.

In this country, Occupé played two seasons with the club, in where scored 6 goals in 30 appearances.

=== Copiapó ===
In January 2011, Bayenga was signed by Chilean side Deportes Copiapó of the Primera B. Bayenga made his debut in a 1–0 away loss to Everton on 20 March 2011. In his second game for the club, he play the full 90 minutes of the game in a 1–0 win to Magallanes, in where was named the man of match. His first goal in Copiapó came on 29 May in a 3–2 away loss against Magallanes at Santiago Bueras Stadium, being the first African player in score a goal in Chile. Due to an injury, Bayenga missed the last part of the Apertura Tournament and the 2011 Copa Chile.

Bayenga returned in a 3–3 draw with Deportes Concepción, in where he had a great performance scoring an important goal in the game. He incremented his tally goal in the next game, scoring another important goal against Deportes Puerto Montt in a 3–2 home win. After a matchday without score in a 1–1 with Curicó Unido, in where he played the full 90 minutes of the game, against Deportes Temuco was his last goal for Copiapó in a 3–2 away win of his team.

However, Bayenga's team had poor season in the year and finished last in the 14th position of the accumulate table with 36 points under of Magallanes in the 13th position with 40 points. For this reasons, Bayenga decided not to continue in the club and caught eye of several teams, the more interested clubs were Palestino, Unión La Calera and Universidad de Concepción.

=== Universidad de Concepción ===
On 9 December 2011, Universidad de Concepción acquired the 60% of the player rights, and therefore Bayenga became into the first Congolese footballer to play in the Chilean Primera División.

== International career ==
In 2009, Bayenga played the African Youth Championship with his national youth team (under-20). He only played 2 games in the tournament against Uganda and did not score any goals.

== Career statistics ==
Club performance			League		Cup		League Cup		Continental		Total	
Season	Club	League	Apps	Goals	Apps	Goals	Apps	Goals	Apps	Goals	Apps	Goals
Argentina			League		Cup		League Cup		South America		Total	
2009–10	Cañuelas	Primera D	30	6	—	—	—	—	—	—	30	6
Chile			League		Copa Chile		League Cup		South America		Total	
2011	Copiapó	Primera B	24	4	0	0	—	—	—	—	24	4
Chile			League		Copa Chile		League Cup		South America		Total	
2012	U. de Conce	Primera A	0	0	0	0	—	—	—	—	0	0
Country	Argentina		30	6	—	—	—	—	—	—	30	6
Country	Chile		24	4	0	0	—	—	—	—	46	9
