= Joao Ortiz (Chilean footballer) =

Chilean footballer (born 1991)

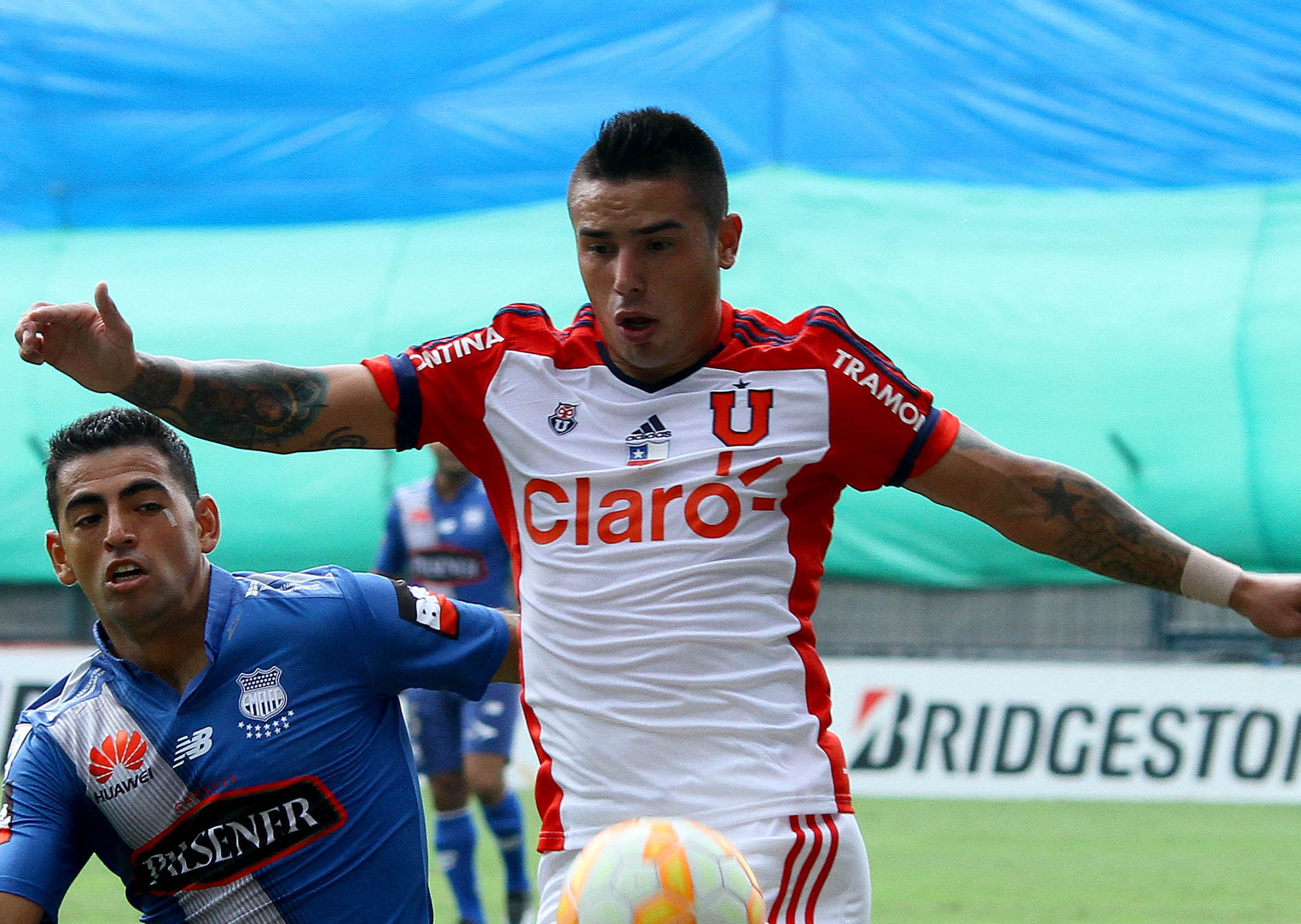
- Ortiz with Universidad de Chile in 2015

Personal information
- Full name: Joao Luis Ortiz Pérez
- Date of birth: February 10, 1991 (age 35)
- Place of birth: La Calera, Chile
- Height: 1.71 m (5 ft 7 in)
- Position: Left-back

Team information
- Current team: Binacional
- Number: 18

Youth career
- Unión La Calera

Senior career*
Years	Team	Apps	(Gls)
2010–2014	Unión La Calera	47	(3)
2013–2014	→ Palestino (loan)	30	(0)
2014–2017	Universidad de Chile	13	(0)
2016	→ Deportes La Serena (loan)	7	(0)
2017	→ Deportivo Municipal (loan)	8	(0)
2017–2018	Unión La Calera	10	(0)
2018	→ Curicó Unido (loan)	9	(0)
2019	Real Garcilaso	17	(0)
2020	Sport Boys	20	(0)
2021	Deportes Melipilla	12	(0)
2022	Carlos A. Mannucci	29	(0)
2023	UTC	24	(0)
2024	Deportivo Municipal	5	(0)
2025	Cienciano	14	(1)
2026–	Binacional	6	(0)
- * Club domestic league appearances and goals as of 30 December 2025

Joao Luis Ortiz Pérez (born 10 Februari 1991) is a Chilean footballer, who plays as left-back for Peruvian club Binacional.

== Career ==
In February 2021, Ortiz joined Deportes Melipilla.

In 2026, Ortiz joined Binacional

== Personal life ==
His father is Peruvian and his mother is Chilean, so he acquired the Peruvian nationality. From his paternal line, he is the nephew of the former Peruvian footballer Eloy Ortíz who also is the nephew of the former Peruvian international footballer Eloy Campos.
