= Mwazulu Diyabanza =

Congolese pan-African and cultural restitution activist

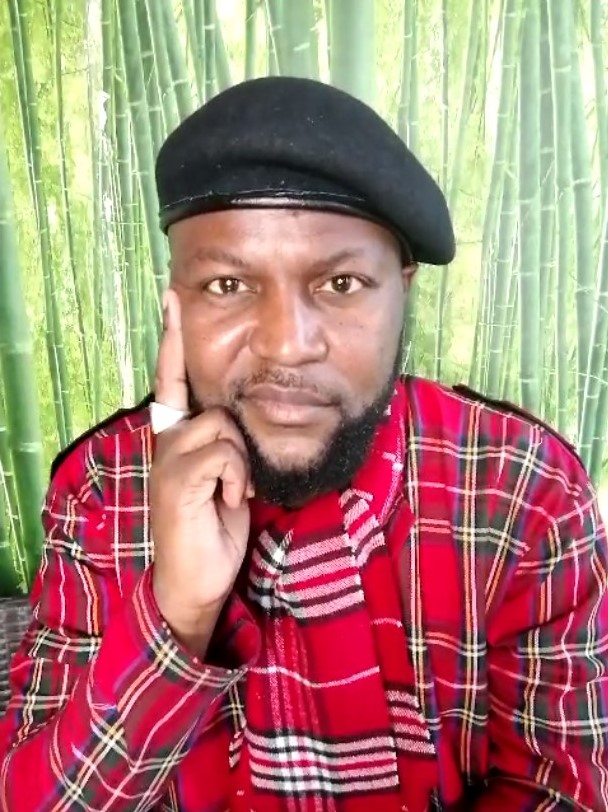
- Born: Emery Mwazulu Diyabanza; Kinshasa, DR Congo
- Occupation: Pan-African political activist
- Known for: Removal of colonial-era cultural artefacts from European museums

Emery Mwazulu Diyabanza is a Congolese pan-African political activist. He is best known for his support of cultural restitution and the removal of African artefacts from European museums obtained during colonisation.

== Personal life ==
Diyabanza was born in Kinshasa in the Democratic Republic of the Congo, but fled to France as a political refugee. As of 2024, he is 45 years old. He divides his time between France and Togo.

Diyabanza says his family were royalty on his mother's side, dating back to the 15th century, and that his grandfather, governor of Mpangu province in the Kingdom of Kongo, was in charge in absence of the king. He says that during the tenure of his grandfather, Europeans arrived and stole artefacts, including a hat made from multiple animal skins, an intricate cane, a copper bracelet, and a leopard skin worn in rituals.

== Political activism ==
Diyabanza is the head of a pan-Africanist movement called Yanka Nku (Unité Dignité Courage, or Unity, Dignity and Courage). He also founded the Front Multiculturel Anti-Spoliation (FMAS, or the Multicultural Front Against Pillaging), which aims to unite the world's indigenous peoples with what he calls their plundered heritage on display in European museums. He also campaigns against the use of the CFA franc currency in West and Central Africa.

== Actions by country ==
=== France ===
In June 2020, Diyabanza and several others entered the Quai Branly museum in Paris, which has around 70,000 objects from sub-Saharan Africa. They took a 19th-century funeral post of the Bari people; police recovered the object and held Diyabanza in custody for three days. A judge fined him €1,000 for attempted theft. Diyabanza protested that his actions were "part of a protest rather than an attempted theft". The five activists he worked with faced up to ten years in prison and a fine of €150,000 each; four of them were eventually given fines of €250 to €1000 each but avoided prison.

A month later, in Marseille, Diyabanza tried to remove an ivory spear from the Museum of African, Oceanian and Native American Art (MAAOA). Charges were brought against him but he was acquitted in court. He was ordered to pay the Louvre €5,000 and a deferred prison term in Paris for removing an object from a display case in the museum. The museum claimed that Diyabanza had "tarnished its image because (his) action had an international and world-media echo".

=== The Netherlands ===
In September 2020 he removed a Congolese funerary statue from the Africa Museum in Berg en Dal. In January the following year, he was given a two-month suspended sentence and a €250 fine, including two years probation. Two women who filmed the event and two men who assisted Diyabanza in removing the object were each fined €100 and given one-month suspended prison sentences and two years probation, and all five were banned from entering the museum for three years. Diyabanza believes that when he was at the museum, he saw a bracelet belonging to his grandfather, but did not take it as it was protected by a glass case.

== See also ==
- African art in Western collections
