= Laura de la Torre (footballer) =

Chilean footballer

Personal information
- Full name: Laura Valentina de la Torre Tovar
- Date of birth: 7 December 1999 (age 26)
- Place of birth: Suba, Bogotá, Colombia
- Height: 1.65 m (5 ft 5 in)
- Position: Defender

Team information
- Current team: Itabirito

Youth career
- 2011–2016: Universidad de Chile

College career
Years	Team	Apps	(Gls)
2021–2022	University of Chile		

Senior career*
Years	Team	Apps	(Gls)
2017–2018	Universidad de Chile		
2019–2022	Santiago Morning		
2023–2024	Minas Brasília		
2025	Real Brasília		
2025	Santiago Morning	11	(3)
2026–	Itabirito		

International career
2016	Chile U17		
2018	Chile U20		
- * Club domestic league appearances and goals as of 12 October 2025

Laura Valentina de la Torre Tovar (born 7 December 1999) is a footballer who plays as a defender for Brazilian club Itabirito. She can also operate as a defensive midfielder. Born in Colombia, she is a former youth international for Chile.

== Club career ==
De la Torre came to the Universidad de Chile youth system at the age of eleven, winning three league titles at under-17 level. She made her professional debut with them and also has represented the university team, winning the national university championship by defeating Viña del Mar University in 2022.

In 2019, she switched to Santiago Morning and spent four seasons with them, winning the Primera División in 2019 and 2020. In addition, she took part in the 2021 Copa Libertadores.

In 2023, de la Torre moved to Brazil and joined Minas Brasília. In 2025, she switched to Real Brasília in the Série A1.

In the second half of 2025, De La Torre returned to Chile and joined Santiago Morning. She left them at the end of the season.

In January 2026, De La Torre returned to Brazil with Itabirito.

== International career ==
De la Torre made her international debut with Chile at under-17 level in a friendly against Argentina on 9 February 2016. In the same year, she received her first call up to the senior team for the friendly against Uruguay on 28 August.

At under-20 level, she represented Chile in the 2018 South American Championship.

== Personal life ==
Born in Suba, Bogotá, Colombia, de la Torre came to Chile at the age of five due to her father's job. She has lived in Santiago and Antofagasta.

She naturalized Chilean by residence in 2016.

Her older brother, Camilo, was with the Club Universidad de Chile youth ranks.

She graduated as a journalist at University of Chile and has worked for Contragolpe, a website about Chilean women's football.
